= 2026–27 Arsenal W.F.C. season =

English women's football club season

Arsenal Women
2026–27 season
- Owner: Kroenke Sports & Entertainment
- Manager: Renée Slegers
- Stadium: Emirates Stadium; Meadow Park (select games)
- WSL: 6th
- FA Cup: Fourth round
- Champions League: League phase
- Top goalscorer: League: Alessia Russo (5); All: Alessia Russo (9)
- Highest home attendance: 29,853 (vs Manchester United, WSL, 19 September 2026) at Emirates Stadium
- Lowest home attendance: 1,910 (vs HB Køge, Champions League, 22 September 2026) at Meadow Park
- Average home league attendance: 25,174
- Biggest win: 3–0 (vs Benfica (H), Champions League, 28 October 2026)
- Biggest defeat: 2–4 (vs Manchester City (A), WSL, 4 October 2026)
| Home colours | Away colours | Third colours |
- All statistics correct as of 8 November 2026.

The 2026–27 season is Arsenal Women's Football Club's 40th season of competitive football. The club will participate in the Women's Super League, the FA Cup and the Champions League. Due to changes in the competition's format, Arsenal will not participate in the League Cup for the first time since the competition began.

On 12 May 2026, the club announced that Emirates Stadium will host all WSL home games for the second year in a row, along with any Champions League games from the quarter-finals onwards. League phase and knockout phase play-offs games of the Champions League, and domestic cup fixtures will continue to be played at Meadow Park.

== Squad information & statistics ==
=== First team squad ===
| No. | Name | Date of birth (age) | Since | Last contract | Signed from |
Goalkeepers
| 1 | (Netherlands) Daphne van Domselaar | 6 March 2000 (age 26) | 2024 | July 2024 | (England) Aston Villa |
| 16 | (Spain) Misa Rodríguez | 22 July 1999 (age 27) | 2026 | July 2026 | (Spain) Real Madrid |
| 28 | (Germany) Anneke Borbe | 17 September 2000 (age 26) | 2025 | July 2025 | (Germany) VfL Wolfsburg |
| 40 | (Denmark) Isabella Damm | 8 April 2008 (age 18) | 2026 | July 2026 | (Denmark) Brøndby |
Defenders
| 2 | (United States) Emily Fox | 5 July 1998 (age 28) | 2024 | September 2026 | (United States) North Carolina Courage |
| 3 | (England) Lotte Wubben-Moy | 11 January 1999 (age 27) | 2020 | April 2025 | (United States) University of North Carolina |
| 5 | (France) Élisa De Almeida | 11 January 1998 (age 28) | 2026 | September 2026 | (France) Paris Saint-Germain |
| 6 | (England) Leah Williamson (vc) | 29 March 1997 (age 29) | 2014 | April 2026 | Homegrown |
| 7 | (Australia) Steph Catley | 26 January 1994 (age 32) | 2020 | April 2026 | (Australia) Melbourne City |
| 22 | (Spain) Ona Batlle | 10 June 1999 (age 27) | 2026 | July 2026 | (Spain) Barcelona |
| 24 | (England) Taylor Hinds | 25 April 1999 (age 27) | 2025 | July 2025 | (England) Liverpool |
| 26 | (England) Katie Reid | 25 September 2006 (age 20) | 2024 | October 2024 | Homegrown |
| 31 | (Sweden) Smilla Holmberg | 11 October 2006 (age 20) | 2026 | January 2026 | (Sweden) Hammarby |
Midfielders
| 4 | (England) Georgia Stanway | 3 January 1999 (age 27) | 2026 | July 2026 | (Germany) Bayern Munich |
| 8 | (Spain) Mariona Caldentey | 19 March 1996 (age 30) | 2024 | July 2024 | (Spain) Barcelona |
| 10 | (Scotland) Kim Little (c) | 29 June 1990 (age 36) | 2016 | March 2026 | (United States) Seattle Reign |
| 12 | (Norway) Frida Maanum | 16 July 1999 (age 27) | 2021 | May 2025 | (Sweden) Linköpings FC |
| 14 | (Switzerland) Géraldine Reuteler | 21 April 1999 (age 27) | 2026 | July 2026 | (Germany) Eintracht Frankfurt |
| 32 | (Australia) Kyra Cooney-Cross | 15 February 2002 (age 24) | 2023 | September 2023 | (Sweden) Hammarby |
| 38 | (England) Maddy Earl | 3 November 2006 (age 20) | 2025 | January 2025 | Homegrown |
Forwards
| 9 | (Australia) Caitlin Foord | 11 November 1994 (age 32) | 2020 | June 2026 | (Australia) Sydney FC |
| 11 | (Canada) Olivia Smith | 5 August 2004 (age 22) | 2025 | July 2025 | (England) Liverpool |
| 17 | (England) Michelle Agyemang | 3 February 2006 (age 20) | 2024 | May 2024 | Homegrown |
| 18 | (England) Chloe Kelly | 15 January 1998 (age 28) | 2025 | July 2025 | (England) Manchester City |
| 19 | (Germany) Lisa Baum | 25 November 2006 (age 19) | 2026 | July 2026 | (Germany) RB Leipzig |
| 23 | (England) Alessia Russo | 8 February 1999 (age 27) | 2023 | September 2025 | (England) Manchester United |
| 25 | (Sweden) Stina Blackstenius | 5 February 1996 (age 30) | 2022 | April 2026 | (Sweden) BK Häcken |
| 29 | (Germany) Selina Cerci | 31 May 2000 (age 26) | 2026 | July 2026 | (Germany) TSG Hoffenheim |

=== Statistics ===
Statistics as of 22 November 2026

==== Appearances and goals ====
| No. | Name | WSL | | FA Cup | | UWCL | | Total | |
| No. | Name | Apps | Goals | Apps | Goals | Apps | Goals | Apps | Goals |
Goalkeepers
| 1 | (Netherlands) Daphne van Domselaar | 1 | 0 | 0 | 0 | 0 | 0 | 1 | 0 |
| 16 | (Spain) Misa Rodríguez | 8 | 0 | 0 | 0 | 4 | 0 | 12 | 0 |
| 28 | (Germany) Anneke Borbe | 2 | 0 | 0 | 0 | 1 | 0 | 3 | 0 |
| 40 | (Denmark) Isabella Damm | 0 | 0 | 0 | 0 | 0 | 0 | 0 | 0 |
Defenders
| 2 | (United States) Emily Fox | 9+2 | 0 | 0 | 0 | 3+1 | 0 | 12+3 | 0 |
| 3 | (England) Lotte Wubben-Moy | 3+2 | 0 | 0 | 0 | 1 | 0 | 4+2 | 0 |
| 5 | (France) Élisa De Almeida | 2+4 | 0 | 0 | 0 | 2 | 0 | 4+4 | 0 |
| 6 | (England) Leah Williamson | 11 | 0 | 0 | 0 | 4+1 | 0 | 15+1 | 0 |
| 7 | (Australia) Steph Catley | 6 | 0 | 0 | 0 | 3 | 0 | 9 | 0 |
| 22 | (Spain) Ona Batlle | 8+1 | 0 | 0 | 0 | 2+1 | 0 | 10+2 | 0 |
| 24 | (England) Taylor Hinds | 3+1 | 0 | 0 | 0 | 4 | 0 | 7+1 | 0 |
| 26 | (England) Katie Reid | 0 | 0 | 0 | 0 | 0 | 0 | 0 | 0 |
| 31 | (Sweden) Smilla Holmberg | 2+6 | 1 | 0 | 0 | 1+2 | 0 | 3+8 | 1 |
Midfielders
| 4 | (England) Georgia Stanway | 11 | 1 | 0 | 0 | 4 | 1 | 15 | 2 |
| 8 | (Spain) Mariona Caldentey | 5 | 0 | 0 | 0 | 1+1 | 1 | 6+1 | 1 |
| 10 | (Scotland) Kim Little (c) | 6+3 | 0 | 0 | 0 | 3+2 | 0 | 9+5 | 0 |
| 12 | (Norway) Frida Maanum | 2+3 | 1 | 0 | 0 | 3+1 | 1 | 5+4 | 2 |
| 14 | (Switzerland) Géraldine Reuteler | 1+2 | 0 | 0 | 0 | 1+1 | 0 | 2+3 | 0 |
| 32 | (Australia) Kyra Cooney-Cross | 6+3 | 0 | 0 | 0 | 4+1 | 0 | 10+4 | 0 |
| 38 | (England) Maddy Earl | 0 | 0 | 0 | 0 | 0 | 0 | 0 | 0 |
Forwards
| 9 | (Australia) Caitlin Foord | 4+7 | 0 | 0 | 0 | 4+1 | 0 | 8+8 | 0 |
| 11 | (Canada) Olivia Smith | 7+3 | 1 | 0 | 0 | 1+4 | 0 | 8+7 | 1 |
| 17 | (England) Michelle Agyemang | 0 | 0 | 0 | 0 | 0 | 0 | 0 | 0 |
| 18 | (England) Chloe Kelly | 1+3 | 0 | 0 | 0 | 1 | 0 | 2+3 | 0 |
| 19 | (Germany) Lisa Baum | 10+1 | 2 | 0 | 0 | 3+2 | 0 | 13+3 | 2 |
| 23 | (England) Alessia Russo | 11 | 5 | 0 | 0 | 4+1 | 4 | 15+1 | 9 |
| 25 | (Sweden) Stina Blackstenius | 2+6 | 0 | 0 | 0 | 1+2 | 0 | 3+8 | 0 |
| 29 | (Germany) Selina Cerci | 0+3 | 0 | 0 | 0 | 0+1 | 0 | 0+4 | 0 |

==== Goalscorers ====
| Rank | No. | Position | Name | Super League | FA Cup | UWCL | Total |
|---|---|---|---|---|---|---|---|
| 1 | 23 | FW | (England) Alessia Russo | 5 | 0 | 4 | 9 |
| 2 | 4 | MF | (England) Georgia Stanway | 1 | 0 | 1 | 2 |
| 2 | 12 | MF | (Norway) Frida Maanum | 1 | 0 | 1 | 2 |
| 2 | 19 | FW | (Germany) Lisa Baum | 2 | 0 | 0 | 2 |
| 5 | 8 | MF | (Spain) Mariona Caldentey | 0 | 0 | 1 | 1 |
| 5 | 11 | FW | (Canada) Olivia Smith | 1 | 0 | 0 | 1 |
| 5 | 31 | DF | (Sweden) Smilla Holmberg | 1 | 0 | 0 | 1 |
| Total | | | | 11 | 0 | 7 | 18 |

==== Disciplinary record ====
| Rank | No. | Position | Name | Super League | | FA Cup | | UWCL | | Total | |
| Rank | No. | Position | Name | Yellow card | Red card | Yellow card | Red card | Yellow card | Red card | Yellow card | Red card |
|---|---|---|---|---|---|---|---|---|---|---|---|
| 1 | 4 | MF | (England) Georgia Stanway | 2 | 0 | 0 | 0 | 2 | 0 | 4 | 0 |
| 2 | 19 | FW | (Germany) Lisa Baum | 1 | 0 | 0 | 0 | 1 | 0 | 2 | 0 |
| 3 | 5 | DF | (France) Élisa De Almeida | 1 | 0 | 0 | 0 | 0 | 0 | 1 | 0 |
| 3 | 6 | DF | (England) Leah Williamson | 1 | 0 | 0 | 0 | 0 | 0 | 1 | 0 |
| 3 | 9 | FW | (Australia) Caitlin Foord | 1 | 0 | 0 | 0 | 0 | 0 | 1 | 0 |
| 3 | 10 | MF | (Scotland) Kim Little | 1 | 0 | 0 | 0 | 0 | 0 | 1 | 0 |
| 3 | 11 | FW | (Canada) Olivia Smith | 1 | 0 | 0 | 0 | 0 | 0 | 1 | 0 |
| 3 | 12 | MF | (Norway) Frida Maanum | 0 | 0 | 0 | 0 | 1 | 0 | 1 | 0 |
| 3 | 23 | FW | (England) Alessia Russo | 0 | 0 | 0 | 0 | 1 | 0 | 1 | 0 |
| 3 | 32 | MF | (Australia) Kyra Cooney-Cross | 1 | 0 | 0 | 0 | 0 | 0 | 1 | 0 |
| Total | | | | 9 | 0 | 0 | 0 | 5 | 0 | 14 | 0 |

==== Clean sheets ====
| Rank | No. | Name | Super League | FA Cup | UWCL | Total |
|---|---|---|---|---|---|---|
| 1 | 16 | (Spain) Misa Rodríguez | 2 | 0 | 1 | 3 |
| 2 | 1 | (Netherlands) Daphne van Domselaar | 1 | 0 | 0 | 1 |
| 2 | 28 | (Germany) Anneke Borbe | 0 | 0 | 1 | 1 |
| Total | | | 3 | 0 | 2 | 5 |

== Transfers, loans and other signings ==
=== Transfers in ===
| Announcement date | No. | Position | Player | From club |
|---|---|---|---|---|
| 3 July 2026 | 4 | MF | (England) Georgia Stanway | (Germany) Bayern Munich |
| 6 July 2026 | 29 | FW | (Germany) Selina Cerci | (Germany) TSG Hoffenheim |
| 8 July 2026 | 14 | MF | (Switzerland) Géraldine Reuteler | (Germany) Eintracht Frankfurt |
| 10 July 2026 | 22 | DF | (Spain) Ona Batlle | (Spain) Barcelona |
| 14 July 2026 | 19 | FW | (Germany) Lisa Baum | (Germany) RB Leipzig |
| 17 July 2026 | 40 | GK | (Denmark) Isabella Damm | (Denmark) Brøndby |
| 22 July 2026 | 16 | GK | (Spain) Misa Rodríguez | (Spain) Real Madrid |
| 3 September 2026 | 5 | DF | (France) Élisa De Almeida | (France) Paris Saint-Germain |

=== Contract extensions ===
| Announcement date | No. | Position | Player | At Arsenal since |
|---|---|---|---|---|
| 11 June 2026 | 9 | FW | (Australia) Caitlin Foord | 2020 |
| 24 September 2026 | 2 | DF | (United States) Emily Fox | 2024 |

=== Transfers out ===
| Announcement date | No. | Position | Player | To club |
|---|---|---|---|---|
| 23 April 2026 | 1 | GK | (Austria) Manuela Zinsberger | (Germany) Borussia Dortmund |
| 7 May 2026 | 40 | GK | (England) Naomi Williams | (England) Watford |
| 11 May 2026 | 5 | DF | (Spain) Laia Codina | (England) West Ham United |
| 11 May 2026 | 21 | MF | (Netherlands) Victoria Pelova | (England) Tottenham Hotspur |
| 11 May 2026 | 9 | FW | (England) Beth Mead | (England) Manchester City |
| 14 May 2026 | 11 | DF | (Republic of Ireland) Katie McCabe | (England) Chelsea |
| 16 July 2026 | 16 | FW | (Sweden) Rosa Kafaji | (England) London City Lionesses |
| 28 July 2026 | 30 | MF | (England) Laila Harbert | (United States) San Diego Wave |
| 10 August 2026 | 22 | DF | (United States) Jenna Nighswonger | (United States) Bay FC |
| 21 August 2026 | 37 | FW | (England) Vivienne Lia | (Germany) Eintracht Frankfurt |

=== Loans out ===
| Announcement date | No. | Position | Player | To club | On loan until |
|---|---|---|---|---|---|
| 2 February 2026 | 36 | DF | (England) Cecily Wellesley-Smith | (Sweden) FC Rosengård | December 2026 |
| 6 August 2026 | 33 | FW | (England) Jessie Gale | (England) Newcastle United | June 2027 |
| 27 August 2026 | 44 | DF | (England) Sophie Harwood | (England) Sheffield United | June 2027 |

== Pre-season ==
| 8 August 2026 | Arsenal (England) | 2–1 | (England) Crystal Palace | London Colney |
| | Baum; Kelly | Report | Hopcroft | Stadium: Arsenal Training Centre; Attendance: 0 (behind closed doors) |

| 13 August 2026 | Arsenal (England) | 2–3 | (Italy) AC Milan | La Manga |
| | Williamson; Cerci | Report | Kyvåg; Stokić; Renzotti | Stadium: La Manga Club; Attendance: 0 (behind closed doors) |

| 19 August 2026 | Arsenal (England) | 2–1 | (England) Manchester City | London Colney |
| | Blackstenius; Baum | Report | Hemp | Stadium: Arsenal Training Centre; Attendance: 0 (behind closed doors) |

| 23 August 2026 | Arsenal (England) | 1–0 | (France) Paris FC | Borehamwood |
| 13:00 BST | Smith 90+1' | Report | | Stadium: Meadow Park; Attendance: 2,531 |

| 26 August 2026 | Arsenal (England) | 5–1 | (England) Charlton Athletic | Borehamwood |
| 19:00 BST | Stanway 35'; Caldentey 44' (pen.); Cooney-Cross 56'; Smith 89'; Maanum 90+2' | | Fitzgerald 24' | Stadium: Meadow Park; Attendance: 2,283; Referee: Sophie Dennington |

== Competitions ==
=== Women's Super League ===
==== League table ====
| Pos | Team | Pld | W | D | L | GF | GA | GD | Pts |
|---|---|---|---|---|---|---|---|---|---|
| 4 | Manchester United | 11 | 6 | 3 | 2 | 14 | 12 | +2 | 21 |
| 5 | Tottenham Hotspur | 11 | 6 | 2 | 3 | 28 | 19 | +9 | 20 |
| 6 | Arsenal | 11 | 3 | 6 | 2 | 11 | 11 | 0 | 15 |
| 7 | Brighton & Hove Albion | 11 | 4 | 2 | 5 | 17 | 16 | +1 | 14 |
| 8 | Aston Villa | 11 | 3 | 5 | 3 | 12 | 17 | −5 | 14 |

Updated to match(es) played on 22 November 2026. Source: Women's Super League Table
Rules for classification: 1) Points; 2) Goal difference; 3) Number of goals scored.

==== Results summary ====
| Overall | | | | | | | | Home | | | | | | Away | | | | | |
| Pld | W | D | L | GF | GA | GD | Pts | W | D | L | GF | GA | GD | W | D | L | GF | GA | GD |
|---|---|---|---|---|---|---|---|---|---|---|---|---|---|---|---|---|---|---|---|
| 11 | 3 | 6 | 2 | 11 | 11 | 0 | 15 | 0 | 6 | 0 | 4 | 4 | 0 | 3 | 0 | 2 | 7 | 7 | 0 |

Last updated: 22 November 2026.
Source: WSL Football

==== Results by matchday ====
| Matchday | 1 | 2 | 3 | 4 | 5 | 6 | 7 | 8 | 9 | 10 | 11 | 12 | 13 | 14 | 15 | 16 | 17 | 18 | 19 | 20 | 21 | 22 | 23 | 24 | 25 | 26 |
|---|---|---|---|---|---|---|---|---|---|---|---|---|---|---|---|---|---|---|---|---|---|---|---|---|---|---|
| Ground | A | H | H | A | A | H | A | H | A | H | H | A | A | H | H | A | H | A | A | H | A | H | H | A | A | H |
| Result | W | D | D | L | L | D | W | D | W | D | D | | | | | | | | | | | | | | | |
| Position | 5 | 5 | 6 | 7 | 10 | 8 | 6 | 7 | 6 | 6 | 6 | | | | | | | | | | | | | | | |

Updated to match(es) played on 22 November 2026. Source: WSL Football
A = Away; H = Home; W = Win; D = Draw; L = Loss; P = Postponed

==== Matches ====
| 6 September 2026 1 | Brighton & Hove Albion | 0–1 | Arsenal | Crawley |
| 12:00 BST | Rule (yellow card) 85'; Murphy (yellow card) 87' | Report | Baum 10'; Williamson (yellow card) 49'; Little (yellow card) 83' | Stadium: Broadfield Stadium; Attendance: 4,104; Referee: Kirsty Dowle |

| 13 September 2026 2 | Arsenal | 0–0 | Crystal Palace | Holloway |
| 14:45 BST | | Report | Goldie (yellow card) 44'; Swaby (yellow card) 83'; O'Brien (yellow card) 85' | Stadium: Emirates Stadium; Attendance: 23,900; Referee: Phoebe Cross |

| 19 September 2026 3 | Arsenal | 1–1 | Manchester United | Holloway |
| 17:30 BST | Baum (yellow card) 43'; Holmberg 90+5' | Report | Zigiotti Olme 67' | Stadium: Emirates Stadium; Attendance: 29,853; Referee: Abigail Byrne |

| 27 September 2026 4 | Chelsea | 1–0 | Arsenal | Fulham |
| 16:30 BST | Thompson 39'; McCabe (yellow card) 45'; Bronze (yellow card) 45+3' | Report | | Stadium: Stamford Bridge; Attendance: 19,349; Referee: Emily Heaslip |

| 4 October 2026 5 | Manchester City | 4–2 | Arsenal | Manchester |
| 16:30 BST | Hemp 45+1', 72'; Casparij 63'; Shaw 84' | Report | Baum 43'; Russo 49'; Smith (yellow card) 82' | Stadium: City of Manchester Stadium; Attendance: 12,360; Referee: Grace Lowe |

| 17 October 2026 6 | Arsenal | 1–1 | Birmingham City | Holloway |
| 12:45 BST | Smith 66'; Stanway (yellow card) 70' | Report | Hurtré 53'; Herron (yellow card) 72' | Stadium: Emirates Stadium; Attendance: 19,426; Referee: Stephen Parkinson |

| 24 October 2026 7 | Tottenham Hotspur | 1–2 | Arsenal | Tottenham |
| 12:45 GMT | Tandberg 13'; Koga (yellow card) 26'; Summanen (yellow card) 43'; Dijkstra (yellow card) 58'; Gaupset (yellow card) 90+7' | Report | Stanway 17', (yellow card) 66'; Russo 56' (pen.); Cooney-Cross (yellow card) 77' | Stadium: Tottenham Hotspur Stadium; Attendance: 13,719; Referee: Phoebe Cross |

| 1 November 2026 8 | Arsenal | 1–1 | Aston Villa | Holloway |
| 12:00 GMT | Russo 85' | Report | Grant 25' | Stadium: Emirates Stadium; Attendance: 23,891; Referee: Megan Wilson |

| 8 November 2026 9 | Liverpool | 1–2 | Arsenal | Liverpool |
| 12:00 GMT | Olsson 15' | Report | Russo 9', 45'; Foord (yellow card) 80' | Stadium: Anfield; Referee: Thomas Parsons |

| 15 November 2026 10 | Arsenal | 1–1 | London City Lionesses | Holloway |
| 16:30 GMT | Maanum 10' | Report | Goodwin 11'; Fernández (yellow card) 57' | Stadium: Emirates Stadium; Attendance: 32,588; Referee: Melissa Burgin |

| 22 November 2026 11 | Arsenal | 0–0 | West Ham United | Holloway |
| 14:30 GMT | De Almeida (yellow card) 90+2' | Report | Nyström (yellow card) 44' | Stadium: Emirates Stadium; Attendance: 21,383; Referee: Lisa Benn |

| 11 December 2026 12 | Everton | v | Arsenal | Walton |
| 19:00 GMT | | | | Stadium: Goodison Park |

| 20 December 2026 13 | Charlton Athletic | v | Arsenal | Charlton |
| 12:00 GMT | | | | Stadium: The Valley |

| 10 January 2027 14 | Arsenal | v | Brighton & Hove Albion | Holloway |
| 12:30 GMT | | | | Stadium: Emirates Stadium |

| 21 January 2027 15 | Arsenal | v | Liverpool | Holloway |
| 19:00 GMT | | | | Stadium: Emirates Stadium |

| 24 January 2027 16 | London City Lionesses | v | Arsenal | Bromley |
| 14:00 GMT | | | | Stadium: Hayes Lane |

| 30 January 2027 17 | Arsenal | v | Manchester City | Holloway |
| 17:30 GMT | | | | Stadium: Emirates Stadium |

| 7 February 2027 18 | Birmingham City | v | Arsenal | Bordesley |
| 14:00 GMT | | | | Stadium: St Andrew's |

| 14 February 2027 19 | Crystal Palace | v | Arsenal | Sutton |
| 14:00 GMT | | | | Stadium: Gander Green Lane |

| 13 March 2027 20 | Arsenal | v | Tottenham Hotspur | Holloway |
| 17:30 GMT | | | | Stadium: Emirates Stadium |

| 17 March 2027 21 | Aston Villa | v | Arsenal | Aston |
| 19:30 GMT | | | | Stadium: Villa Park |

| 28 March 2027 22 | Arsenal | v | Chelsea | Holloway |
| 14:00 BST | | | | Stadium: Emirates Stadium |

| 4 April 2027 23 | Arsenal | v | Everton | Holloway |
| 14:00 BST | | | | Stadium: Emirates Stadium |

| 2 May 2027 24 | West Ham United | v | Arsenal | Dagenham |
| 14:00 BST | | | | Stadium: Victoria Road |

| 9 May 2027 25 | Manchester United | v | Arsenal | Trafford |
| 13:00 BST | | | | Stadium: Old Trafford |

| 21–23 May 2027 26 | Arsenal | v | Charlton Athletic | Holloway |
| BST | | | | Stadium: Emirates Stadium |

=== FA Cup ===
As a member of the top tier, Arsenal will enter the FA Cup in the fourth round.

=== UEFA Women's Champions League ===
As a result of finishing second in the 2025–26 Women's Super League, Arsenal will enter the Champions League in the league phase.

==== League phase ====
| Pos | Team | Pld | W | D | L | GF | GA | GD | Pts | Qualification |
|---|---|---|---|---|---|---|---|---|---|---|
| 6 | (Royal Spanish Football Federation) Real Madrid (T) | 5 | 2 | 3 | 0 | 10 | 5 | +5 | 9 (Note: Ranked based on away goals scored, Manchester City 8, Real Madrid 3) | Advance to the knockout phase play-offs (seeded) |
| 7 | (Italian Football Federation) Juventus (T) | 5 | 3 | 0 | 2 | 10 | 9 | +1 | 9 | Advance to the knockout phase play-offs (seeded) |
| 8 | (The Football Association) Arsenal (T) | 5 | 2 | 2 | 1 | 7 | 5 | +2 | 8 | Advance to the knockout phase play-offs (seeded) |
| 9 | (Italian Football Federation) Roma | 5 | 2 | 1 | 2 | 5 | 11 | −6 | 7 | Advance to the knockout phase play-offs (unseeded) |
| 10 | (Portuguese Football Federation) Benfica | 5 | 2 | 0 | 3 | 7 | 11 | −4 | 6 | Advance to the knockout phase play-offs (unseeded) |

Updated to match(es) played on 19 November 2026. Source: UEFA
Rules for classification: League phase tiebreakers
(T) Qualified, but not yet for the particular phase indicated
Notes:

| 22 September 2026 1 | Arsenal (England) | 1–0 | (Denmark) HB Køge | Borehamwood |
| 20:00 BST | Caldentey 90+3' (pen.) | Report | Hermann (yellow card) 88' | Stadium: Meadow Park; Attendance: 1,910; Referee: Eleni Antoniou (Greece) |

| 30 September 2026 2 | Paris FC (France) | 2–2 | (England) Arsenal | Paris |
| 17:45 BST | Mateo 72'; Mendy 87' (pen.) | Report | Russo 41'; Stanway 50', (yellow card) 63' | Stadium: Stade Jean-Bouin; Attendance: 11,207; Referee: Iuliana Demetrescu (Romania) |

| 28 October 2026 3 | Arsenal (England) | 3–0 | (Portugal) Benfica | Borehamwood |
| 20:00 GMT | Russo 39', 66', 79' (pen.) | Report | Amado (yellow card) 77' | Stadium: Meadow Park; Attendance: 2,438; Referee: Ivana Projkovska (North Macedonia) |

| 12 November 2026 4 | Barcelona (Spain) | 1–1 | (England) Arsenal | Barcelona |
| 17:45 GMT | Graham Hansen 59'; Cámara (yellow card) 66' | Report | Maanum 22', (yellow card) 55'; Russo (yellow card) 78' | Stadium: Camp Nou; Attendance: 26,171; Referee: Ivana Martinčić (Croatia) |

| 19 November 2026 5 | Arsenal (England) | 0–2 | (France) OL Lyonnes | Borehamwood |
| 20:00 GMT | Baum (yellow card) 60'; Stanway (yellow card) 85' | Report | Egurrola (yellow card) 23'; Brand 24'; Dumornay 57' | Stadium: Meadow Park; Attendance: 2,317; Referee: Silvia Gasperotti (Italy) |

| 16 December 2026 6 | Inter Milan (Italy) | v | (England) Arsenal | Monza |
| 20:00 GMT | | Report | | Stadium: Brianteo |
