= 2026 FIFA Women's Champions Cup final =

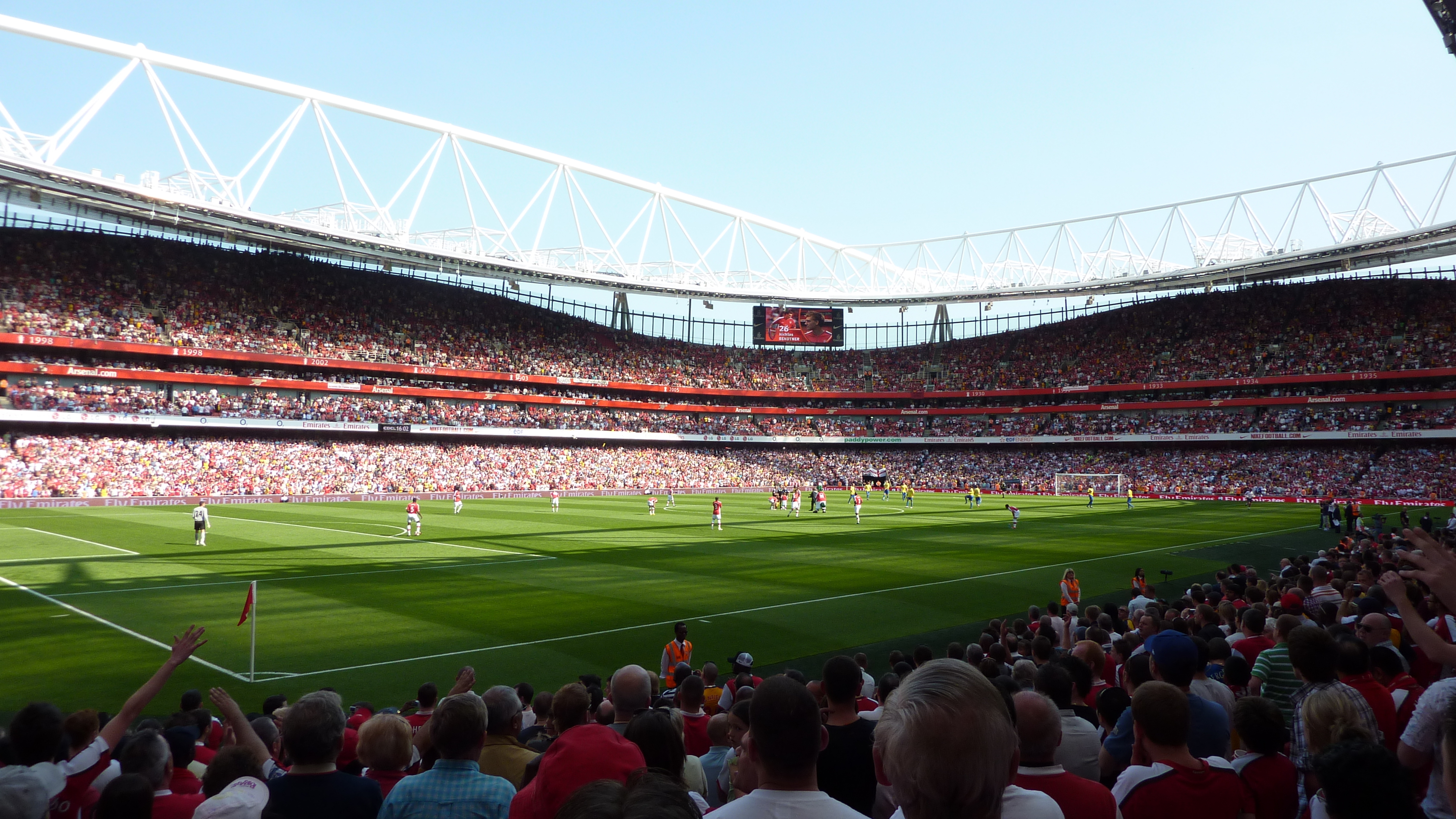
- The Emirates Stadium in London hosted the final.
- Event: 2026 FIFA Women's Champions Cup
| Arsenal | Corinthians |
| (England) | (Brazil) |
| 3 | 2 |
- After extra time
- Date: 1 February 2026
- Venue: Emirates Stadium, London
- Player of the Match: Kim Little (Arsenal)
- Referee: Katia Itzel García (Mexico)
- Attendance: 25,031
- Weather: Light rain 8 °C (46 °F); 93% humidity

The 2026 FIFA Women's Champions Cup final was the final match of the 2026 FIFA Women's Champions Cup, the first edition of an international club women's football tournament featuring the club champions from each of the six continental confederations. The match took place on 1 February 2026 at the Emirates Stadium in London, England, between English club Arsenal and Brazilian club Corinthians.

Arsenal won the match 3–2 after extra time to secure the inaugural FIFA Women's Champions Cup title.

== Route to the final ==
| (England) Arsenal | | Team | (Brazil) Corinthians | |
|---|---|---|---|---|
| Opponent | Result | 2026 FIFA Women's Champions Cup | Opponent | Result |
| (Morocco) AS FAR | 6–0 | Semi-finals | (United States) Gotham FC | 1–0 |

== Match ==
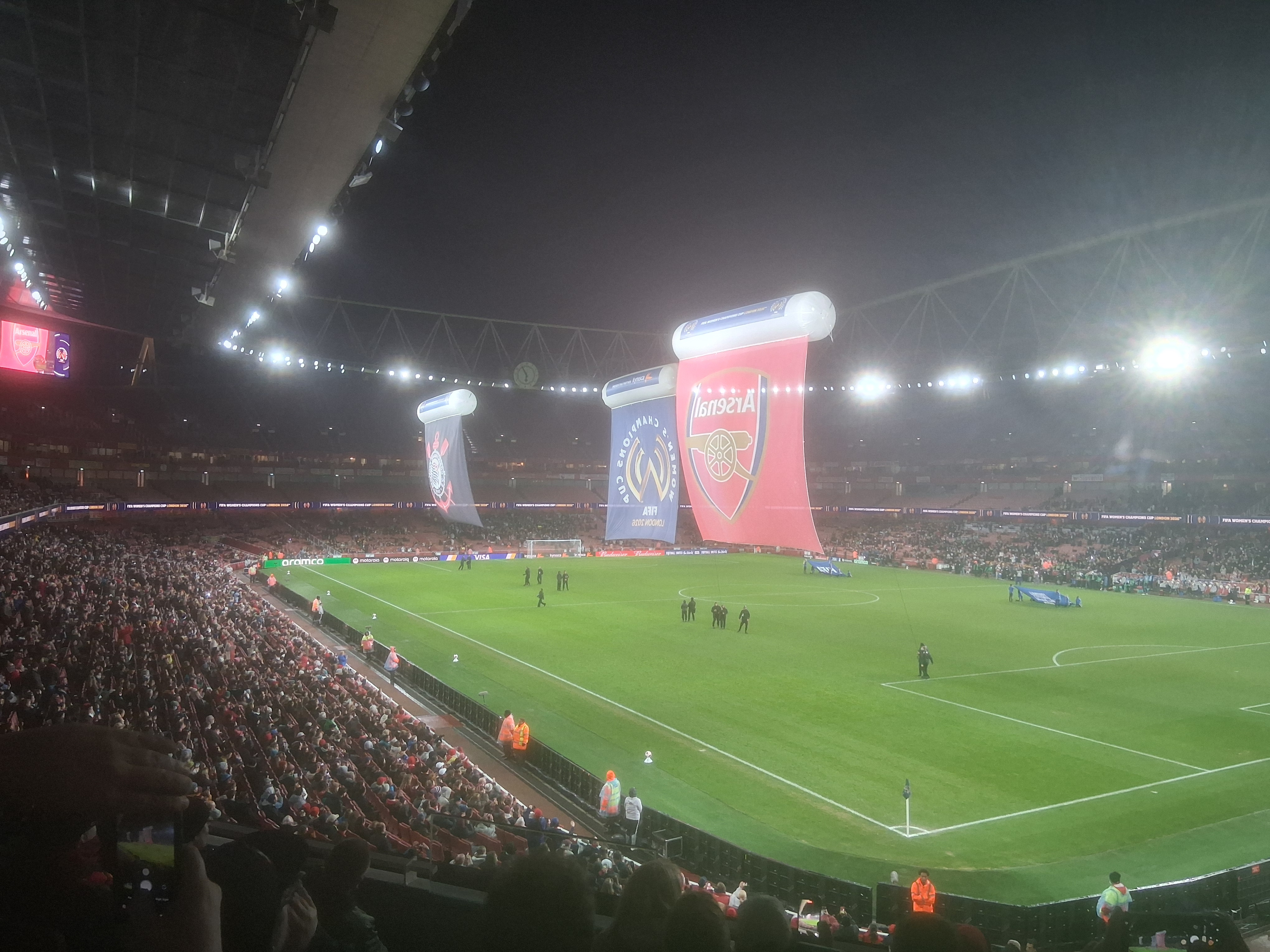
Pre-match blimps

=== Details ===
1 February 2026
18:00 UTC+0

| Arsenal (England) | 3–2 (a.e.t.) | (Brazil) Corinthians |
|---|---|---|
| Smith 15'; Wubben-Moy 58'; Foord 104' | Report | Gabi Zanotti 21'; Victória 90+6' (pen.) |

Emirates Stadium, London
Attendance: 25,031
Referee: Katia Itzel García (Mexico)

| Arsenal | Corinthians |

| GK | 28 | (Germany) Anneke Borbe | | (substituted off) 120+11' (con.) |
| RB | 2 | (United States) Emily Fox | | (substituted off) 64' |
| CB | 3 | (England) Lotte Wubben-Moy |
| CB | 7 | (Australia) Steph Catley |
| LB | 11 | (Republic of Ireland) Katie McCabe |
| CM | 10 | (Scotland) Kim Little (c) | | (substituted off) 92' |
| CM | 8 | (Spain) Mariona Caldentey | (yellow card) 105' | (substituted off) 106' |
| RW | 9 | (England) Beth Mead | | (substituted off) 76' |
| AM | 23 | (England) Alessia Russo |
| LW | 15 | (Canada) Olivia Smith | | (substituted off) 64' |
| CF | 25 | (Sweden) Stina Blackstenius | | (substituted off) 46' |
Substitutes:
| GK | 14 | (Netherlands) Daphne van Domselaar | | (substituted on) 120+11' (con.) |
| GK | 40 | (England) Naomi Williams |
| GK | 53 | (England) Amy Liddiard |
| DF | 5 | (Spain) Laia Codina | | (substituted on) 92' |
| DF | 6 | (England) Leah Williamson |
| DF | 31 | (Sweden) Smilla Holmberg | | (substituted on) 64' |
| MF | 12 | (Norway) Frida Maanum | | (substituted on) 46' |
| MF | 21 | (Netherlands) Victoria Pelova | | (substituted on) 106' |
| MF | 32 | (Australia) Kyra Cooney-Cross |
| MF | 44 | (England) Sophie Harwood |
| FW | 18 | (England) Chloe Kelly | | (substituted on) 76' |
| FW | 19 | (Australia) Caitlin Foord | | (substituted on) 64' |
Manager:
(Netherlands) Renée Slegers

| GK | 12 | (Brazil) Letícia |
| RB | 23 | (Brazil) Gi Fernandes | (yellow card) 40' | (substituted off) 46' |
| CB | 5 | (Brazil) Thaís Ferreira |
| CB | 3 | (Brazil) Leticia Teles |
| LB | 37 | (Brazil) Tamires | | (substituted off) 120+12' |
| DM | 88 | (Brazil) Ana Vitória | | (substituted off) 65' |
| RM | 30 | (Brazil) Jaqueline | | (substituted off) 85' |
| CM | 8 | (Brazil) Andressa Alves | (yellow card) 96' | (substituted off) 96' |
| CM | 27 | (Brazil) Duda Sampaio |
| LM | 25 | (Uruguay) Belén Aquino | | (substituted off) 73' |
| CF | 10 | (Brazil) Gabi Zanotti (c) | | (substituted off) 73' |
Substitutes:
| GK | 1 | (Brazil) Nicole |
| GK | 32 | (Brazil) Rillary |
| DF | 22 | (Brazil) Juliete |
| DF | 33 | (Brazil) Duda Mineira |
| DF | 99 | (Brazil) Érika | | (substituted on) 46' |
| MF | 13 | (Brazil) Ivana Fuso | | (substituted on) 73' |
| MF | 17 | (Brazil) Victória | | (substituted on) 73' |
| MF | 19 | (Brazil) Letícia Monteiro |
| MF | 20 | (Colombia) Paola García |
| MF | 31 | (Venezuela) Dayana Rodríguez | | (substituted on) 96' |
| FW | 7 | (Colombia) Gisela Robledo | | (substituted on) 85' |
| FW | 11 | (Brazil) Ariel Godoi | | (substituted on) 120+12' |
| FW | 29 | (Brazil) Rhaizza |
| FW | 40 | (Brazil) Jhonson | | (substituted on) 65' |
| FW | 77 | (Brazil) Carol Nogueira |
Manager:
(Brazil) Lucas Piccinato

Player of the Match:
Kim Little (Arsenal)

Assistant referees:
Sandra Ramírez Alemán (Mexico)
Karen Díaz Medina (Mexico)
Fourth official:
Karen Hernández Andrade (Mexico)
Video assistant referee:
Tatiana Guzmán (Nicaragua)
Assistant video assistant referee:
Diana Perez Borja (Mexico)

Match rules

- 90 minutes
- 30 minutes of extra time if necessary
- Penalty shoot-out if scores still level
- Maximum of fifteen named substitutes
- Maximum of five substitutions, with a sixth allowed in extra time
- Maximum of three substitution opportunities, with a fourth allowed in extra time
- Maximum of one concussion substitution, granting the opposition an additional standalone substitution

=== Statistics ===
Match statistics
| Statistic | Arsenal | Corinthians |
|---|---|---|
| Goals scored | 3 | 2 |
| Total shots | 31 | 16 |
| Shots on target | 14 | 6 |
| Ball possession | 71% | 29% |
| Corner kicks | 9 | 2 |
| Fouls committed | 17 | 10 |
| Offsides | 2 | 1 |
| Yellow cards | 1 | 2 |
| Red cards | 0 | 0 |
