= 2025–26 Arsenal W.F.C. season =

English women's football club season

Arsenal Women
2025–26 season
- Owner: Kroenke Sports & Entertainment
- Manager: Renée Slegers
- Stadium: Emirates Stadium; Meadow Park (select games)
- Super League: 2nd
- FA Cup: Quarter-finals
- League Cup: Semi-finals
- Champions League: Semi-finals
- FIFA Women's Champions Cup: Winners
- Top goalscorer: League: Alessia Russo (13); All: Alessia Russo (24)
- Highest home attendance: 56,537 (vs Chelsea, WSL, 8 November 2025) at Emirates Stadium
- Lowest home attendance: 2,418 (vs Manchester United, League Cup, 21 January 2026) at Meadow Park
- Average home league attendance: 33,808
- Biggest win: 7–0 (vs Leicester City, WSL, 29 April 2026)
- Biggest defeat: 0–2 (vs Brighton & Hove Albion (H), FA Cup, 5 April 2026); 1–3 (vs Lyon (A), Champions League, 2 May 2026)
| Home colours | Away colours | Third colours |
- All statistics correct as of 16 May 2026.

The 2025–26 season is Arsenal Women's Football Club's 39th season of competitive football. The club participated in the Women's Super League, the FA Cup, the League Cup, the Champions League and the inaugural Champions Cup, winning the latter after defeating South American champions Corinthians 3–2 in the final on 1 February 2026.

On 10 June 2025, the club announced that Emirates Stadium will host all 11 WSL home games for the first time, alongside Champions League knockout phase games (apart from the knockout phase play-offs) subject to qualification. League phase and knockout phase play-offs games of the Champions League, and all domestic cup home matches, will continue to be played at Meadow Park, which was upgraded to meet UEFA regulations.

== Squad information & statistics ==
=== First team squad ===
| No. | Name | Date of birth (age) | Since | Last contract | Signed from |
Goalkeepers
| 1 | (Austria) Manuela Zinsberger | 19 October 1995 (age 30) | 2019 | January 2024 | (Germany) Bayern Munich |
| 13 | (Czech Republic) Barbora Votíková | 13 September 1996 (age 29) | 2026 | February 2026 | (Czech Republic) Slavia Prague (loan) |
| 14 | (Netherlands) Daphne van Domselaar | 6 March 2000 (age 26) | 2024 | July 2024 | (England) Aston Villa |
| 28 | (Germany) Anneke Borbe | 17 September 2000 (age 25) | 2025 | July 2025 | (Germany) VfL Wolfsburg |
| 40 | (England) Naomi Williams | 24 October 2004 (age 21) | 2023 | June 2023 | Homegrown |
Defenders
| 2 | (United States) Emily Fox | 5 July 1998 (age 28) | 2024 | January 2024 | (United States) North Carolina Courage |
| 3 | (England) Lotte Wubben-Moy | 11 January 1999 (age 27) | 2020 | April 2025 | (United States) University of North Carolina |
| 5 | (Spain) Laia Codina | 22 January 2000 (age 26) | 2023 | August 2023 | (Spain) Barcelona |
| 6 | (England) Leah Williamson (vc) | 29 March 1997 (age 29) | 2014 | April 2026 | Homegrown |
| 7 | (Australia) Steph Catley | 26 January 1994 (age 32) | 2020 | April 2026 | (Australia) Melbourne City |
| 11 | (Republic of Ireland) Katie McCabe | 21 September 1995 (age 30) | 2015 | September 2023 | (Republic of Ireland) Shelbourne |
| 24 | (England) Taylor Hinds | 25 April 1999 (age 27) | 2025 | July 2025 | (England) Liverpool |
| 26 | (England) Katie Reid | 25 September 2006 (age 19) | 2024 | October 2024 | Homegrown |
| 31 | (Sweden) Smilla Holmberg | 11 October 2006 (age 19) | 2026 | January 2026 | (Sweden) Hammarby |
| 44 | (England) Sophie Harwood | 23 December 2007 (age 18) | 2026 | January 2026 | Homegrown |
Midfielders
| 8 | (Spain) Mariona Caldentey | 19 March 1996 (age 30) | 2024 | July 2024 | (Spain) Barcelona |
| 10 | (Scotland) Kim Little (c) | 29 June 1990 (age 36) | 2016 | March 2026 | (United States) Seattle Reign |
| 12 | (Norway) Frida Maanum | 16 July 1999 (age 27) | 2021 | May 2025 | (Sweden) Linköpings FC |
| 21 | (Netherlands) Victoria Pelova | 3 June 1999 (age 27) | 2023 | January 2023 | (Netherlands) Ajax |
| 32 | (Australia) Kyra Cooney-Cross | 15 February 2002 (age 24) | 2023 | September 2023 | (Sweden) Hammarby |
Forwards
| 9 | (England) Beth Mead | 9 May 1995 (age 31) | 2017 | December 2022 | (England) Sunderland |
| 15 | (Canada) Olivia Smith | 5 August 2004 (age 22) | 2025 | July 2025 | (England) Liverpool |
| 18 | (England) Chloe Kelly | 15 January 1998 (age 28) | 2025 | July 2025 | (England) Manchester City |
| 19 | (Australia) Caitlin Foord | 11 November 1994 (age 31) | 2020 | June 2023 | (Australia) Sydney FC |
| 23 | (England) Alessia Russo | 8 February 1999 (age 27) | 2023 | September 2025 | (England) Manchester United |
| 25 | (Sweden) Stina Blackstenius | 5 February 1996 (age 30) | 2022 | April 2026 | (Sweden) BK Häcken |
| 29 | (England) Michelle Agyemang | 3 February 2006 (age 20) | 2024 | May 2024 | Homegrown |

=== Statistics ===
Statistics as of 16 May 2026

==== Appearances and goals ====
| No. | Name | Super League | | FA Cup | | League Cup | | UWCL | | Champions Cup | | Total | |
| No. | Name | Apps | Goals | Apps | Goals | Apps | Goals | Apps | Goals | Apps | Goals | Apps | Goals |
Goalkeepers
| 1 | (Austria) Manuela Zinsberger | 0 | 0 | 0 | 0 | 0 | 0 | 0 | 0 | 0 | 0 | 0 | 0 |
| 13 | (Czech Republic) Barbora Votíková | 0 | 0 | 0 | 0 | 0 | 0 | 0 | 0 | 0 | 0 | 0 | 0 |
| 14 | (Netherlands) Daphne van Domselaar | 14 | 0 | 1 | 0 | 0 | 0 | 9 | 0 | 0+1 | 0 | 24+1 | 0 |
| 28 | (Germany) Anneke Borbe | 8 | 0 | 2 | 0 | 2 | 0 | 3 | 0 | 2 | 0 | 17 | 0 |
| 40 | (England) Naomi Williams | 0 | 0 | 0 | 0 | 0 | 0 | 0 | 0 | 0 | 0 | 0 | 0 |
Defenders
| 2 | (United States) Emily Fox | 18+2 | 0 | 2+1 | 0 | 1 | 0 | 9+3 | 1 | 1 | 0 | 31+6 | 1 |
| 3 | (England) Lotte Wubben-Moy | 14+3 | 0 | 2 | 0 | 1+1 | 0 | 10+1 | 0 | 2 | 1 | 29+5 | 1 |
| 5 | (Spain) Laia Codina | 7+5 | 0 | 1+2 | 0 | 2 | 1 | 3+4 | 0 | 1+1 | 0 | 14+12 | 1 |
| 6 | (England) Leah Williamson | 2+4 | 1 | 1 | 0 | 1 | 0 | 3+2 | 0 | 0 | 0 | 7+6 | 1 |
| 7 | (Australia) Steph Catley | 15+1 | 0 | 2 | 0 | 0+1 | 0 | 7+1 | 0 | 1 | 0 | 25+3 | 0 |
| 11 | (Republic of Ireland) Katie McCabe | 18+3 | 1 | 2+1 | 0 | 2 | 0 | 10+2 | 0 | 1+1 | 0 | 33+7 | 1 |
| 22 | (United States) Jenna Nighswonger | 0+1 | 0 | 0 | 0 | 0 | 0 | 0 | 0 | 0 | 0 | 0+1 | 0 |
| 24 | (England) Taylor Hinds | 6+10 | 0 | 1+1 | 0 | 1 | 0 | 4+6 | 0 | 1 | 0 | 13+17 | 0 |
| 26 | (England) Katie Reid | 5+1 | 0 | 0 | 0 | 0 | 0 | 1 | 0 | 0 | 0 | 6+1 | 0 |
| 31 | (Sweden) Smilla Holmberg | 5+4 | 2 | 1+2 | 0 | 0+1 | 0 | 1+5 | 0 | 1+1 | 0 | 8+13 | 2 |
| 44 | (England) Sophie Harwood | 0+2 | 0 | 0 | 0 | 0 | 0 | 0 | 0 | 0 | 0 | 0+2 | 0 |
Midfielders
| 8 | (Spain) Mariona Caldentey | 20+2 | 4 | 3 | 0 | 1 | 0 | 12 | 2 | 2 | 1 | 38+2 | 7 |
| 10 | (Scotland) Kim Little (c) | 17+1 | 0 | 3 | 2 | 0+2 | 0 | 7+3 | 0 | 1+1 | 0 | 28+7 | 2 |
| 12 | (Norway) Frida Maanum | 11+7 | 6 | 1+2 | 1 | 2 | 0 | 4+7 | 2 | 1+1 | 1 | 19+17 | 10 |
| 21 | (Netherlands) Victoria Pelova | 7+10 | 0 | 0+2 | 1 | 2 | 0 | 4+3 | 0 | 1+1 | 0 | 14+16 | 1 |
| 32 | (Australia) Kyra Cooney-Cross | 3+3 | 0 | 0 | 0 | 1 | 0 | 4+3 | 0 | 0 | 0 | 8+6 | 0 |
Forwards
| 9 | (England) Beth Mead | 12+9 | 2 | 2 | 0 | 0+2 | 0 | 6+2 | 3 | 2 | 0 | 22+13 | 5 |
| 15 | (Canada) Olivia Smith | 15+5 | 5 | 2+1 | 0 | 2 | 0 | 8+3 | 3 | 2 | 2 | 29+9 | 10 |
| 18 | (England) Chloe Kelly | 4+12 | 5 | 2 | 0 | 0 | 0 | 5+3 | 1 | 0+2 | 0 | 11+17 | 6 |
| 19 | (Australia) Caitlin Foord | 12+8 | 2 | 1+2 | 0 | 2 | 0 | 6+5 | 0 | 0+2 | 1 | 21+17 | 3 |
| 23 | (England) Alessia Russo | 21+1 | 13 | 2+1 | 0 | 1 | 0 | 11+1 | 9 | 1+1 | 2 | 36+4 | 24 |
| 25 | (Sweden) Stina Blackstenius | 8+12 | 10 | 2+1 | 1 | 1+1 | 1 | 5+5 | 1 | 2 | 1 | 18+19 | 14 |

==== Goalscorers ====
| Rank | No. | Position | Name | Super League | FA Cup | League Cup | UWCL | Champions Cup | Total |
|---|---|---|---|---|---|---|---|---|---|
| 1 | 23 | FW | (England) Alessia Russo | 13 | 0 | 0 | 9 | 2 | 24 |
| 2 | 25 | FW | (Sweden) Stina Blackstenius | 10 | 1 | 1 | 1 | 1 | 14 |
| 3 | 15 | FW | (Canada) Olivia Smith | 5 | 0 | 0 | 3 | 2 | 10 |
| 3 | 12 | MF | (Norway) Frida Maanum | 6 | 1 | 0 | 2 | 1 | 10 |
| 5 | 8 | MF | (Spain) Mariona Caldentey | 4 | 0 | 0 | 2 | 1 | 7 |
| 6 | 18 | FW | (England) Chloe Kelly | 5 | 0 | 0 | 1 | 0 | 6 |
| 7 | 9 | FW | (England) Beth Mead | 2 | 0 | 0 | 3 | 0 | 5 |
| 8 | 19 | FW | (Australia) Caitlin Foord | 2 | 0 | 0 | 0 | 1 | 3 |
| 9 | 10 | MF | (Scotland) Kim Little | 0 | 2 | 0 | 0 | 0 | 2 |
| 9 | 31 | DF | (Sweden) Smilla Holmberg | 2 | 0 | 0 | 0 | 0 | 2 |
| 11 | 2 | DF | (United States) Emily Fox | 0 | 0 | 0 | 1 | 0 | 1 |
| 11 | 3 | DF | (England) Lotte Wubben-Moy | 0 | 0 | 0 | 0 | 1 | 1 |
| 11 | 5 | DF | (Spain) Laia Codina | 0 | 0 | 1 | 0 | 0 | 1 |
| 11 | 6 | DF | (England) Leah Williamson | 1 | 0 | 0 | 0 | 0 | 1 |
| 11 | 11 | DF | (Republic of Ireland) Katie McCabe | 1 | 0 | 0 | 0 | 0 | 1 |
| 11 | 21 | MF | (Netherlands) Victoria Pelova | 0 | 1 | 0 | 0 | 0 | 1 |
| Own goal | | | | 2 | 0 | 0 | 2 | 0 | 4 |
| Total | | | | 53 | 5 | 2 | 24 | 9 | 93 |

==== Disciplinary record ====
| Rank | No. | Position | Name | Super League | | FA Cup | | League Cup | | UWCL | | Champions Cup | | Total | |
| Rank | No. | Position | Name | Booked | Sent off (straight red) | Booked | Sent off (straight red) | Booked | Sent off (straight red) | Booked | Sent off (straight red) | Booked | Sent off (straight red) | Booked | Sent off (straight red) |
|---|---|---|---|---|---|---|---|---|---|---|---|---|---|---|---|
| 1 | 15 | FW | (Canada) Olivia Smith | 2 | 0 | 0 | 0 | 0 | 1 | 3 | 0 | 0 | 0 | 5 | 1 |
| 2 | 18 | FW | (England) Chloe Kelly | 4 | 0 | 0 | 0 | 0 | 0 | 1 | 0 | 0 | 0 | 5 | 0 |
| 3 | 21 | MF | (Netherlands) Victoria Pelova | 3 | 0 | 0 | 0 | 0 | 0 | 1 | 0 | 0 | 0 | 4 | 0 |
| 4 | 2 | DF | (United States) Emily Fox | 2 | 0 | 0 | 0 | 0 | 0 | 1 | 0 | 0 | 0 | 3 | 0 |
| 4 | 11 | DF | (Republic of Ireland) Katie McCabe | 2 | 0 | 0 | 0 | 0 | 0 | 1 | 0 | 0 | 0 | 3 | 0 |
| 4 | 19 | FW | (Australia) Caitlin Foord | 2 | 0 | 0 | 0 | 0 | 0 | 1 | 0 | 0 | 0 | 3 | 0 |
| 7 | 3 | DF | (England) Lotte Wubben-Moy | 1 | 0 | 0 | 0 | 0 | 0 | 1 | 0 | 0 | 0 | 2 | 0 |
| 7 | 8 | MF | (Spain) Mariona Caldentey | 0 | 0 | 0 | 0 | 0 | 0 | 1 | 0 | 1 | 0 | 2 | 0 |
| 7 | 9 | FW | (England) Beth Mead | 1 | 0 | 0 | 0 | 0 | 0 | 1 | 0 | 0 | 0 | 2 | 0 |
| 7 | 14 | GK | (Netherlands) Daphne van Domselaar | 2 | 0 | 0 | 0 | 0 | 0 | 0 | 0 | 0 | 0 | 2 | 0 |
| 7 | 24 | DF | (England) Taylor Hinds | 0 | 0 | 1 | 0 | 0 | 0 | 1 | 0 | 0 | 0 | 2 | 0 |
| 12 | 5 | DF | (Spain) Laia Codina | 0 | 0 | 0 | 0 | 0 | 0 | 1 | 0 | 0 | 0 | 1 | 0 |
| 12 | 6 | DF | (England) Leah Williamson | 1 | 0 | 0 | 0 | 0 | 0 | 0 | 0 | 0 | 0 | 1 | 0 |
| 12 | 7 | DF | (Australia) Steph Catley | 0 | 0 | 1 | 0 | 0 | 0 | 0 | 0 | 0 | 0 | 1 | 0 |
| 12 | 12 | MF | (Norway) Frida Maanum | 0 | 0 | 0 | 0 | 0 | 0 | 1 | 0 | 0 | 0 | 1 | 0 |
| Total | | | | 20 | 0 | 2 | 0 | 0 | 1 | 10 | 0 | 5 | 0 | 37 | 1 |

==== Clean sheets ====
| Rank | No. | Name | Super League | FA Cup | League Cup | UWCL | Champions Cup | Total |
|---|---|---|---|---|---|---|---|---|
| 1 | 28 | (Germany) Anneke Borbe | 6 | 2 | 1 | 2 | 1 | 12 |
| 2 | 14 | (Netherlands) Daphne van Domselaar | 5 | 0 | 0 | 2 | 0 | 7 |
| Total | | | 11 | 2 | 1 | 4 | 1 | 19 |

== Transfers, loans and other signings ==
=== Transfers in ===
| Announcement date | No. | Position | Player | From club |
|---|---|---|---|---|
| 2 July 2025 | 18 | FW | (England) Chloe Kelly | (England) Manchester City |
| 7 July 2025 | 24 | DF | (England) Taylor Hinds | (England) Liverpool |
| 15 July 2025 | 28 | GK | (Germany) Anneke Borbe | (Germany) VfL Wolfsburg |
| 17 July 2025 | 15 | FW | (Canada) Olivia Smith | (England) Liverpool |
| 5 January 2026 | 31 | DF | (Sweden) Smilla Holmberg | (Sweden) Hammarby |

=== Loans in ===
| Announcement date | No. | Position | Player | From club |
|---|---|---|---|---|
| 3 February 2026 | 13 | GK | (Czech Republic) Barbora Votíková | (Czech Republic) Slavia Prague |

=== Contract extensions ===
| Announcement date | No. | Position | Player | At Arsenal since |
|---|---|---|---|---|
| 5 September 2025 | 23 | FW | (England) Alessia Russo | 2023 |
| 9 January 2026 | Coach | | (Netherlands) Renée Slegers | 2025 |
| 26 March 2026 | 10 | MF | (Scotland) Kim Little | 2016 |
| 21 April 2026 | 25 | FW | (Sweden) Stina Blackstenius | 2022 |
| 28 April 2026 | 7 | DF | (Australia) Steph Catley | 2020 |
| 30 April 2026 | 6 | DF | (England) Leah Williamson | 2014 |

=== Transfers out ===
| Announcement date | No. | Position | Player | To club |
|---|---|---|---|---|
| 8 May 2025 | 17 | FW | (Sweden) Lina Hurtig | (Italy) Fiorentina |
| 8 May 2025 | 28 | DF | (Sweden) Amanda Ilestedt | (Germany) Eintracht Frankfurt |
| 8 May 2025 | 29 | DF | (England) Teyah Goldie | (England) London City Lionesses |
| 23 July 2025 | 56 | MF | (England) Freya Godfrey | (England) London City Lionesses |
| 15 August 2025 | 26 | DF | (Austria) Laura Wienroither | (England) Manchester City |
| 4 September 2025 | 13 | MF | (Switzerland) Lia Wälti | (Italy) Juventus |

=== Loans out ===
| Announcement date | No. | Position | Player | To club | On loan until |
|---|---|---|---|---|---|
| 11 August 2025 | 16 | FW | (Sweden) Rosa Kafaji | (England) Brighton & Hove Albion | End of season |
| 19 August 2025 | 29 | FW | (England) Michelle Agyemang | (England) Brighton & Hove Albion | January 2026 |
| 25 August 2025 | 30 | MF | (England) Laila Harbert | (United States) Portland Thorns | January 2026 |
| 2 September 2025 | 40 | GK | (England) Naomi Williams | (England) Bristol City | January 2026 |
| 3 September 2025 | 33 | FW | (England) Jessie Gale | (England) Portsmouth | January 2026 |
| 3 September 2025 | 37 | FW | (England) Vivienne Lia | (England) Nottingham Forest | February 2026 |
| 4 September 2025 | 38 | MF | (England) Maddy Earl | (England) Ipswich Town | February 2026 |
| 4 September 2025 | 36 | DF | (England) Cecily Wellesley-Smith | (England) Leicester City | January 2026 |
| 10 January 2026 | 33 | FW | (England) Jessie Gale | (England) Bristol City | End of season |
| 10 January 2026 | 22 | DF | (United States) Jenna Nighswonger | (England) Aston Villa | End of season |
| 28 January 2026 | 30 | MF | (England) Laila Harbert | (England) Everton | End of season |
| 2 February 2026 | 36 | DF | (England) Cecily Wellesley-Smith | (Sweden) FC Rosengård | December 2026 |
| 5 February 2026 | 38 | MF | (England) Maddy Earl | (Scotland) Glasgow City F.C. | End of season |
| 9 February 2026 | 37 | FW | (England) Vivienne Lia | (Sweden) Hammarby | December 2026 |

== Suspensions ==
| No. | Position | Player | Games suspended | Reason |
|---|---|---|---|---|
| 15 | FW | (Canada) Olivia Smith | v. Chelsea, 24 January 2026 | Red card (two yellows) vs. Manchester United |
| 15 | FW | (Canada) Olivia Smith | v. OH Leuven, 18 February 2026 | Accumulation of three UWCL league phase / knock-out phase yellow cards |

== Club ==
=== Kits ===
Supplier: Adidas / Sponsor: Fly Emirates / Sleeve sponsor: Visit Rwanda

Kits using Adidas's Three Stripes trademark
| Home | Home alt. | Away | Away alt. | Away alt. 2 | Away alt. 3 | Goalkeeper^{1} | Goalkeeper^{2} | Goalkeeper^{4} |

Kits using Adidas's Trefoil trademark
| Third | Third alt. | Goalkeeper^{3} | Goalkeeper^{5} | Goalkeeper^{6} |

=== Kit information ===
This is Adidas's seventh year supplying Arsenal kit, having taken over from Puma at the beginning of the 2019–20season.

- Home: The club revealed their new home kit for the 2025–26 season on 15 May 2025. The kit uses Arsenal's traditional colours of red and white. The shirt has a red body and white sleeves and is complemented by white shorts and red socks. Red shorts may be used in some away games when there will be a colour clash with the home team's kit. Taken from the "Victoria Concordia Crescit" club crest, first used in the 1949–50 season, the gothic "A" of "Arsenal" is repeated across the body of the shirt. The kit was launched alongside a film named The pulse of our club.
- Away: On 21 July, the Gunners released their new away kit, which is a tribute to the ability of the club's supporters to energise the players in to feeling "100ft tall", stand out and own the moment. The shirt has a dark navy base with a lighter-navy lightning bolt pattern, a signature away-kit design that was inspired by the Royal Arsenal Gatehouse lightning bolt. The kit is complemented by navy shorts and socks, whereby metallic grey shorts will be used in the away games in which there are a colour clash with the home team's kit. The kit was launched with an accompanying video named Ready for new heights.
- Third: On 4 August, the club released their new third kit, which is inspired by the 20th anniversary of Arsenal's final season at the "iconic" Highbury Stadium. The shirt has a white base with off-white details that echo the stadium's distinctive art deco architecture. It also features a polo collar with dark red and gold stripes. The kit is complemented by dark red shorts and white socks, whereby white shorts will be used in the away games in which there are a colour clash with the home team's kit. The kit was launched with an accompanying video named A tribute to elegance, art and style.
- Goalkeeper: The new goalkeeper kits are based on Adidas's goalkeeper template for the season.

== Pre-season ==
| 23 August 2025 | Arsenal | 3–4 | Tottenham Hotspur | Borehamwood |
| 15:00 BST | Pelova 7'; Grant 31' (o.g.); Foord 74' | Report | England 14', 59' (pen.); Vinberg 62'; Summanen 77' | Stadium: Meadow Park; Attendance: 1926; Referee: Matthew Norton |

| 27 August 2025 | Arsenal | 2–0 | West Ham United | Borehamwood |
| 19:00 BST | Maanum 73', 80' | | | Stadium: Meadow Park; Attendance: 2594 |

== Competitions ==
=== Overall record ===
| Competition | First match | Last match | Starting round | Final position | Record | | | | | | | |
| Competition | First match | Last match | Starting round | Final position | Pld | W | D | L | GF | GA | GD | Win % |
|---|---|---|---|---|---|---|---|---|---|---|---|---|
| Women's Super League | 6 September 2025 | 16 May 2026 | Matchday 1 | 2nd | 22 | 15 | 6 | 1 | 53 | 14 | +39 | 68.18 |
| Women's FA Cup | 18 January 2026 | 5 April 2026 | Fourth round | Quarter-finals | 3 | 2 | 0 | 1 | 5 | 2 | +3 | 66.67 |
| Women's League Cup | 21 December 2025 | 21 January 2026 | Quarter-finals | Semi-finals | 2 | 1 | 0 | 1 | 2 | 1 | +1 | 50.00 |
| UEFA Women's Champions League | 7 October 2025 | 2 May 2026 | League phase | Semi-finals | 12 | 8 | 0 | 4 | 24 | 13 | +11 | 66.67 |
| FIFA Women's Champions Cup | 28 January 2026 | 1 February 2026 | Semi-finals | Winners | 2 | 2 | 0 | 0 | 9 | 2 | +7 | 100.00 |
| Total | | | | | 41 | 28 | 6 | 7 | 93 | 32 | +61 | 68.29 |

Source: FA WSL

=== Women's Super League ===
==== League table ====
| Pos | Team | Pld | W | D | L | GF | GA | GD | Pts | Qualification or relegation |
|---|---|---|---|---|---|---|---|---|---|---|
| 1 | Manchester City (C) | 22 | 18 | 1 | 3 | 62 | 19 | +43 | 55 | Qualification for the Champions League league phase |
| 2 | Arsenal | 22 | 15 | 6 | 1 | 53 | 14 | +39 | 51 | Qualification for the Champions League league phase |
| 3 | Chelsea | 22 | 15 | 4 | 3 | 44 | 20 | +24 | 49 | Qualification for the Champions League third qualifying round |
| 4 | Manchester United | 22 | 11 | 7 | 4 | 38 | 22 | +16 | 40 | |
| 5 | Tottenham Hotspur | 22 | 11 | 3 | 8 | 35 | 38 | −3 | 36 | |

Source: WSL League Table
Rules for classification: 1) Points; 2) Goal difference; 3) Number of goals scored.
(C) Champions

==== Results summary ====
| Overall | | | | | | | | Home | | | | | | Away | | | | | |
| Pld | W | D | L | GF | GA | GD | Pts | W | D | L | GF | GA | GD | W | D | L | GF | GA | GD |
|---|---|---|---|---|---|---|---|---|---|---|---|---|---|---|---|---|---|---|---|
| 22 | 15 | 6 | 1 | 53 | 14 | +39 | 51 | 8 | 3 | 0 | 28 | 6 | +22 | 7 | 3 | 1 | 25 | 8 | +17 |

Source: FA WSL

==== Results by matchday ====
| Matchday | 1 | 2 | 3 | 4 | 5 | 6 | 7 | 8 | 9 | 10 | 11 | 12 | 13 | 15 | 17 | 18 | 19 | 14^{1} | 16^{2} | 20 | 21 | 22 |
|---|---|---|---|---|---|---|---|---|---|---|---|---|---|---|---|---|---|---|---|---|---|---|
| Ground | H | A | A | H | A | H | A | H | A | H | A | H | A | H | A | H | H | H | A | A | H | A |
| Result | W | W | D | D | L | W | W | D | D | W | W | D | W | W | W | W | W | W | D | W | W | W |
| Position | 2 | 2 | 3 | 5 | 5 | 5 | 5 | 4 | 4 | 4 | 3 | 3 | 3 | 4 | 4 | 4 | 3 | 3 | 3 | 3 | 2 | 2 |

Source: FA WSL
A = Away; H = Home; W = Win; D = Draw; L = Loss; P = Postponed
Notes:
- ^{1} Matchday 14 (v. Leicester City) was postponed due to Arsenal's participation in the 2026 FIFA Women's Champions Cup.

^{2} Matchday 16 (v. Brighton & Hove Albion) was postponed due waterlogged pitch.

==== Matches ====
| 6 September 2025 1 | Arsenal | 4–1 | London City Lionesses | Holloway |
| 13:30 BST | Smith 29'; Kelly 45+2', (yellow card) 64'; Blackstenius 83'; Maanum 84' | Report | Asllani 17' (pen.); Parris (yellow card) 20'; Zelem (yellow card) 28'; Kumagai (yellow card) 58' | Stadium: Emirates Stadium; Attendance: 38,142; Referee: Stacey Fullicks |

| 12 September 2025 2 | West Ham United | 1–5 | Arsenal | Dagenham |
| 19:30 BST | van Domselaar 5' (o.g.); Gorry (yellow card) 50' | Report | Maanum 21'; Blackstenius 52'; Foord 62'; Russo 90', 90+3' (pen.) | Stadium: Victoria Road; Attendance: 3,483; Referee: Megan Wilson |

| 21 September 2025 3 | Manchester United | 0–0 | Arsenal | Leigh |
| 14:50 BST | | Report | | Stadium: Leigh Sports Village; Attendance: 8,665; Referee: Kirsty Dowle |

| 27 September 2025 4 | Arsenal | 1–1 | Aston Villa | Holloway |
| 12:00 BST | Maanum 10'; Fox (yellow card) 15'; Foord (yellow card) 83' | Report | Deslandes (yellow card) 46'; Wilms (yellow card) 52'; Parker 90+4' | Stadium: Emirates Stadium; Attendance: 24,712; Referee: Lisa Benn |

| 4 October 2025 5 | Manchester City | 3–2 | Arsenal | Manchester |
| 12:00 BST | Shaw 36'; Casparij 61'; Beney 88' | Report | Caldentey 46'; Kelly 83' | Stadium: Academy Stadium; Referee: Melissa Burgin |

| 12 October 2025 6 | Arsenal | 1–0 | Brighton & Hove Albion | Holloway |
| 14:30 BST | Olislagers 15' (o.g.); Kelly (yellow card) 90+12' | Report | | Stadium: Emirates Stadium; Attendance: 27,336; Referee: Kirsty Dowle |

| 2 November 2025 7 | Leicester City | 1–4 | Arsenal | Leicester |
| 12:00 GMT | Tierney (yellow card) 77'; Mouchon 83' | Report | Russo 7'; Kees 32' (o.g.); Blackstenius 36', 84' | Stadium: King Power Stadium; Attendance: 3,923; Referee: Phoebe Cross |

| 8 November 2025 8 | Arsenal | 1–1 | Chelsea | Holloway |
| 12:00 GMT | McCabe (yellow card) 55'; Pelova (yellow card) 64'; Russo 87' | Report | Thompson 9' | Stadium: Emirates Stadium; Attendance: 56,537; Referee: Melissa Burgin |

| 16 November 2025 9 | Tottenham Hotspur | 0–0 | Arsenal | Leyton |
| 14:30 GMT | Thomas (yellow card) 82' | Report | McCabe (yellow card) 41' | Stadium: Brisbane Road; Attendance: 6,788; Referee: Emily Heaslip |

| 6 December 2025 10 | Arsenal | 2–1 | Liverpool | Holloway |
| 12:00 GMT | Smith 16'; Foord (yellow card) 64'; Blackstenius 87' | Report | Olsson 30'; Clark (yellow card) 90+2' | Stadium: Emirates Stadium; Attendance: 34,345; Referee: Kirsty Dowle |

| 13 December 2025 11 | Everton | 1–3 | Arsenal | Walton |
| 12:00 GMT | Hayashi 13'; Fernández (yellow card) 89'; Mace (yellow card) 90+4' | Report | McCabe 11'; Russo 15'; Smith 87' | Stadium: Goodison Park; Attendance: 4,343; Referee: Stacey Pearson |

| 10 January 2026 12 | Arsenal | 0–0 | Manchester United | Holloway |
| 12:30 GMT | | Report | Riviere (yellow card) 45+4' (yellow-red card) 65'; Tullis-Joyce (yellow card) 78' | Stadium: Emirates Stadium; Attendance: 37,627; Referee: Abigail Byrne |

| 24 January 2026 13 | Chelsea | 0–2 | Arsenal | Fulham |
| 12:30 GMT | | Report | Mead (yellow card) 15', (goal) 55'; Caldentey 61' | Stadium: Stamford Bridge; Attendance: 30,545; Referee: Kirsty Dowle |

| 8 February 2026 15 | Arsenal | 1–0 | Manchester City | Holloway |
| 12:00 GMT | Smith 17'; Van Domselaar (yellow card) 80' | Report | | Stadium: Emirates Stadium; Attendance: 39,155; Referee: Grace Lowe |

| 15 March 2026 17 | London City Lionesses | 0–2 | Arsenal | Bromley |
| 11:55 GMT | Godfrey (yellow card) 45+2'; Corrales (yellow card) 57'; Franssi (yellow card) 60' | Report | Smith 15', (yellow card) 61'; Blackstenius 76'; Kelly (yellow card) 86'; Fox (yellow card) 87'; Pelova (yellow card) 90+1' | Stadium: Hayes Lane; Attendance: 5,414; Referee: Kirsty Dowle |

| 21 March 2026 18 | Arsenal | 5–0 | West Ham United | Holloway |
| 12:00 GMT | Kelly 4', 55', 80'; Russo 47'; Mead 87' | Report | Belloumou (yellow card) 77'; Hansen (yellow card) 87'; Piubel (yellow card) 90+11' | Stadium: Emirates Stadium; Attendance: 24,711; Referee: Phoebe Cross |

| 28 March 2026 19 | Arsenal | 5–2 | Tottenham Hotspur | Holloway |
| 17:30 GMT | Russo 5', 7', 27'; Smith (yellow card) 38'; Foord 61'; Van Domselaar (yellow card) 90+1'; Blackstenius 90+5' | Report | Maanum 20' (o.g.); Nildén (yellow card) 38'; England 78' | Stadium: Emirates Stadium; Attendance: 46,123; Referee: Grace Lowe |

| 29 April 2026 14 | Arsenal | 7–0 | Leicester City | Holloway |
| 19:00 BST | Maanum 25'; Holmberg 27', 48'; Blackstenius 41', 45+5'; Caldentey 55'; Williamson (yellow card) 57', (goal) 63' | Report | Swaby (yellow card) 61' | Stadium: Emirates Stadium; Attendance: 18,130; Referee: Lisa Benn |
Note: This fixture, originally scheduled for 31 January 2026, was postponed due to Arsenal's participation in the 2026 FIFA Women's Champions Cup.

| 6 May 2026 16 | Brighton & Hove Albion | 1–1 | Arsenal | Crawley |
| 19:45 BST | Minami (yellow card) 35'; Tsunoda 43'; Seike (yellow card) 90+3' | Report | Pelova (yellow card) 41'; Maanum 62'; Kelly (yellow card) 85' | Stadium: Broadfield Stadium; Attendance: 3,450; Referee: Callum Jones |
Note: This fixture, originally scheduled for 15 February 2026 and a 14:30 kick-off, was postponed due to a waterlogged pitch.

| 9 May 2026 20 | Aston Villa | 0–3 | Arsenal | Aston |
| 12:00 BST | | Report | Russo 4', 52'; Maanum 35' | Stadium: Villa Park; Attendance: 7,944; Referee: Melissa Burgin |
Note: This fixture, originally scheduled for 26 April 2026 was postponed due to Arsenal's participation in the 2025–26 UEFA Women's Champions League knockout phase

| 13 May 2026 21 | Arsenal | 1–0 | Everton | Holloway |
| 19:00 BST | Blackstenius 90+3' | Report | Kramžar (yellow card) 28'; Wheeler (yellow card) 32' | Stadium: Emirates Stadium; Attendance: 25,068; Referee: Grace Lowe |
Note: This fixture, originally scheduled for 3 May 2026 was postponed due to Arsenal's participation in the 2025–26 UEFA Women's Champions League knockout phase

| 16 May 2026 22 | Liverpool | 1–3 | Arsenal | Liverpool |
| 13:00 BST | Shaw 74' | Report | Russo 21', 37'; Caldentey 32'; Wubben-Moy (yellow card) 41' | Stadium: Anfield; Referee: Emily Heaslip |

=== FA Cup ===
As a member of the top tier, Arsenal entered the FA Cup in the fourth round.

| 18 January 2026 Fourth round | Arsenal | 2–0 | Aston Villa | Borehamwood |
| 14:00 GMT | Blackstenius 52'; Little 62' | Report | Jean-François (yellow card) 64'; Parker (yellow card) 90+2' | Stadium: Meadow Park; Attendance: 2,722; Referee: Lisa Benn |

| 22 February 2026 Fifth round | Arsenal | 3–0 | Bristol City | Borehamwood |
| 13:00 GMT | Little 25'; Catley (yellow card) 41'; Russo (penalty missed) 50'; Pelova 62'; Maanum 69'; Hinds (yellow card) 90+13' | Report | Syme (yellow card) 19'; Morgan (yellow card) 31'; Farrugia (yellow card) 90+1' | Stadium: Meadow Park; Attendance: 2,665; Referee: Stacey Fullicks |

| 5 April 2026 Quarter-finals | Arsenal | 0–2 | Brighton & Hove Albion | Borehamwood |
| 13:00 BST | | Report | Čanković (yellow card) 21'; Haley 48'; Hayes 63'; Vanegas (yellow card) 79' | Stadium: Meadow Park; Attendance: 3,660; Referee: Abigail Byrne |

=== League Cup ===
Having qualified for the 2025–26 UEFA Women's Champions League league phase, Arsenal entered the League Cup at the quarter-final stage.

==== Knockout stage ====
| 21 December 2025 Quarter-final | Crystal Palace | 0–2 | Arsenal | Sutton |
| 13:00 GMT | Nolan (yellow card) 42' | Report | Codina 20'; Blackstenius 90+3' | Stadium: Gander Green Lane; Attendance: 3,040; Referee: Abigail Byrne |

| 21 January 2026 Semi-final | Arsenal | 0–1 | Manchester United | Borehamwood |
| 19:00 GMT | Smith (yellow card) 13' (yellow-red card) 61' | Report | Park (yellow card) 13'; Terland 45+2'; Sandberg (yellow card) 57'; Tullis-Joyce (yellow card) 58'; Zigiotti (yellow card) 60'; Le Tissier (yellow card) 70' | Stadium: Meadow Park; Attendance: 2,418; Referee: Stacey Fullicks |

=== UEFA Women's Champions League ===
As winners of the 2024–25 UEFA Women's Champions League, Arsenal entered this season's competition at the league phase.

==== League phase ====
| Pos | Team | Pld | W | D | L | GF | GA | GD | Pts | Qualification |
|---|---|---|---|---|---|---|---|---|---|---|
| 3 | (The Football Association) Chelsea | 6 | 4 | 2 | 0 | 20 | 3 | +17 | 14 | Advance to the quarter-finals (seeded) |
| 4 | (German Football Association) Bayern Munich | 6 | 4 | 1 | 1 | 14 | 13 | +1 | 13 | Advance to the quarter-finals (seeded) |
| 5 | (The Football Association) Arsenal | 6 | 4 | 0 | 2 | 11 | 6 | +5 | 12 | Advance to the knockout phase play-offs (seeded) |
| 6 | (The Football Association) Manchester United | 6 | 4 | 0 | 2 | 7 | 9 | −2 | 12 | Advance to the knockout phase play-offs (seeded) |
| 7 | (Royal Spanish Football Federation) Real Madrid | 6 | 3 | 2 | 1 | 13 | 7 | +6 | 11 | Advance to the knockout phase play-offs (seeded) |

Source: UEFA
Rules for classification: League phase tiebreakers

| 7 October 2025 1 | Arsenal (England) | 1–2 | (France) Lyon | Borehamwood |
| 20:00 BST | Russo 7'; Mead (yellow card) 35'; Maanum (yellow card) 84' | Report | Katoto (yellow card) 5'; Dumornay 18', 23'; Tarciane (yellow card) 78' | Stadium: Meadow Park; Attendance: 3,023; Referee: Maria Sole Ferrieri Caputi (Italy) |

| 16 October 2025 2 | Benfica (Portugal) | 0–2 | (England) Arsenal | Lisbon |
| 20:00 BST | Cameirão (yellow card) 62'; Alves (yellow card) 66' | Report | Mead 57'; Smith (yellow card) 66'; Caldentey (yellow card) 87'; Russo 89' | Stadium: Estádio da Luz; Attendance: 7,218; Referee: Miriama Bočková (Slovakia) |

| 12 November 2025 3 | Bayern Munich (Germany) | 3–2 | (England) Arsenal | Munich |
| 17:45 GMT | Şehitler 67'; Harder 80'; Viggósdóttir 86' | Report | Fox 5'; Caldentey 23' | Stadium: Allianz Arena; Attendance: 15,407; Referee: Marta Huerta de Aza (Spain) |

| 19 November 2025 4 | Arsenal (England) | 2–1 | (Spain) Real Madrid | Borehamwood |
| 20:00 GMT | Russo 53', 67'; Kelly (yellow card) 56'; D'Antino (yellow card) 88' | Report | Weir 43' | Stadium: Meadow Park; Attendance: 3,132; Referee: Silvia Gasperotti (Italy) |

| 9 December 2025 5 | Arsenal (England) | 1–0 | (Netherlands) Twente | Borehamwood |
| 20:00 GMT | Mead 10'; Smith (yellow card) 55' | Report | Elberink (yellow card) 51'; van Ginkel (yellow card) 64' | Stadium: Meadow Park; Attendance: 2,300; Referee: Michalina Diakow (Poland) |

| 17 December 2025 6 | OH Leuven (Belgium) | 0–3 | (England) Arsenal | Leuven |
| 20:00 GMT | Veefkind (yellow card) 64' | Report | Smith 18'; Mead 27'; Janssen 67' (o.g.) | Stadium: Den Dreef; Attendance: 9,285; Referee: Rasa Grigonė (Lithuania) |

==== Knockout phase ====
===== Play-offs =====
| 11 February 2026 First leg | OH Leuven (Belgium) | 0–4 | (England) Arsenal | Leuven |
| 17:45 GMT | Mertens (yellow card) 43' | Report | Fox (yellow card) 20'; Maanum 22', 52'; Smith 37', (yellow card) 80'; Russo 72' | Stadium: Den Dreef; Attendance: 5,860; Referee: Iuliana Demetrescu (Romania) |

| 18 February 2026 Second leg | Arsenal (England) | 3–1 (7–1 agg.) | (Belgium) OH Leuven | Borehamwood |
| 20:00 GMT | Russo 23', 90+1'; Caldentey 65' (pen.) | Report | Mertens (yellow card) 11'; Pusztai 29'; Seynhaeve (yellow card) 86' | Stadium: Meadow Park; Attendance: 2,634; Referee: Eleni Antoniou (Greece) |

===== Quarter-finals =====
| 24 March 2026 First leg | Arsenal (England) | 3–1 | (England) Chelsea | Holloway |
| 20:00 GMT | Blackstenius 22'; Kelly 32'; Codina (yellow card) 35'; Russo 76' | Report | James (yellow card) 28', (goal) 66' | Stadium: Emirates Stadium; Attendance: 18,087; Referee: Alina Peşu (Romania) |

| 1 April 2026 Second leg | Chelsea (England) | 1–0 (2–3 agg.) | (England) Arsenal | Fulham |
| 20:00 BST | Carpenter (yellow card) 48'; James (yellow card) 62'; Nüsken 90+4'; Bompastor (yellow card) 90+6' (yellow-red card) 90+7' | Report | Hinds (yellow card) 66'; D'Antino (yellow card) 90+1' | Stadium: Stamford Bridge; Attendance: 16,117; Referee: Frida Klarlund (Denmark) |

===== Semi-finals =====
| 26 April 2026 First leg | Arsenal (England) | 2–1 | (France) Lyon | Holloway |
| 15:30 BST | Engen 59' (o.g.); Smith 83' | Report | Brand 18'; Hegerberg (yellow card) 32'; Heaps (yellow card) 43'; Yohannes (yellow card) 53' | Stadium: Emirates Stadium; Attendance: 26,758; Referee: Désirée Blanco (Switzerland) |

| 2 May 2026 Second leg | Lyon (France) | 3–1 (4–3 agg.) | (England) Arsenal | Décines-Charpieu |
| 14:00 BST | Renard 22' (pen.), (yellow card) 47'; Diani 36'; Brand 86' | Report | Wubben-Moy (yellow card) 19'; McCabe (yellow card) 22'; Pelova (yellow card) 70'; Russo 76'; Foord (yellow card) 90+5' | Stadium: Parc Olympique Lyonnais; Attendance: 22,505; Referee: Maria Sole Ferrieri Caputi (Italy) |

=== FIFA Women's Champions Cup ===
As winners of the 2024–25 UEFA Women's Champions League, Arsenal were UEFA's representative in the inaugural competition and entered in the semi-finals.

==== Semi-finals ====
| 28 January 2026 Semi-final | Arsenal (England) | 6–0 | (Morocco) AS FAR | Brentford |
| 18:00 GMT | Blackstenius 8'; Maanum 12'; Caldentey 21' (pen.); Smith 41'; Russo 66', 76' | Report | Benzina (yellow card) 81' | Stadium: Brentford Community Stadium; Attendance: 8,066; Referee: Yoshimi Yamashita (Japan) |

==== Final ====
| 1 February 2026 Final | Arsenal (England) | 3–2 (a.e.t.) | (Brazil) Corinthians | Holloway |
| 18:00 GMT | Smith 15'; Wubben-Moy 58'; Foord 104'; Caldentey (yellow card) 105' | Report | Zanotti 21'; Fernandes (yellow card) 40'; Victória 90+6' (pen.); Andressa (yellow card) 96' | Stadium: Emirates Stadium; Attendance: 25,031; Referee: Katia Itzel García (Mexico) |
