= Smilla Holmberg =

Swedish footballer

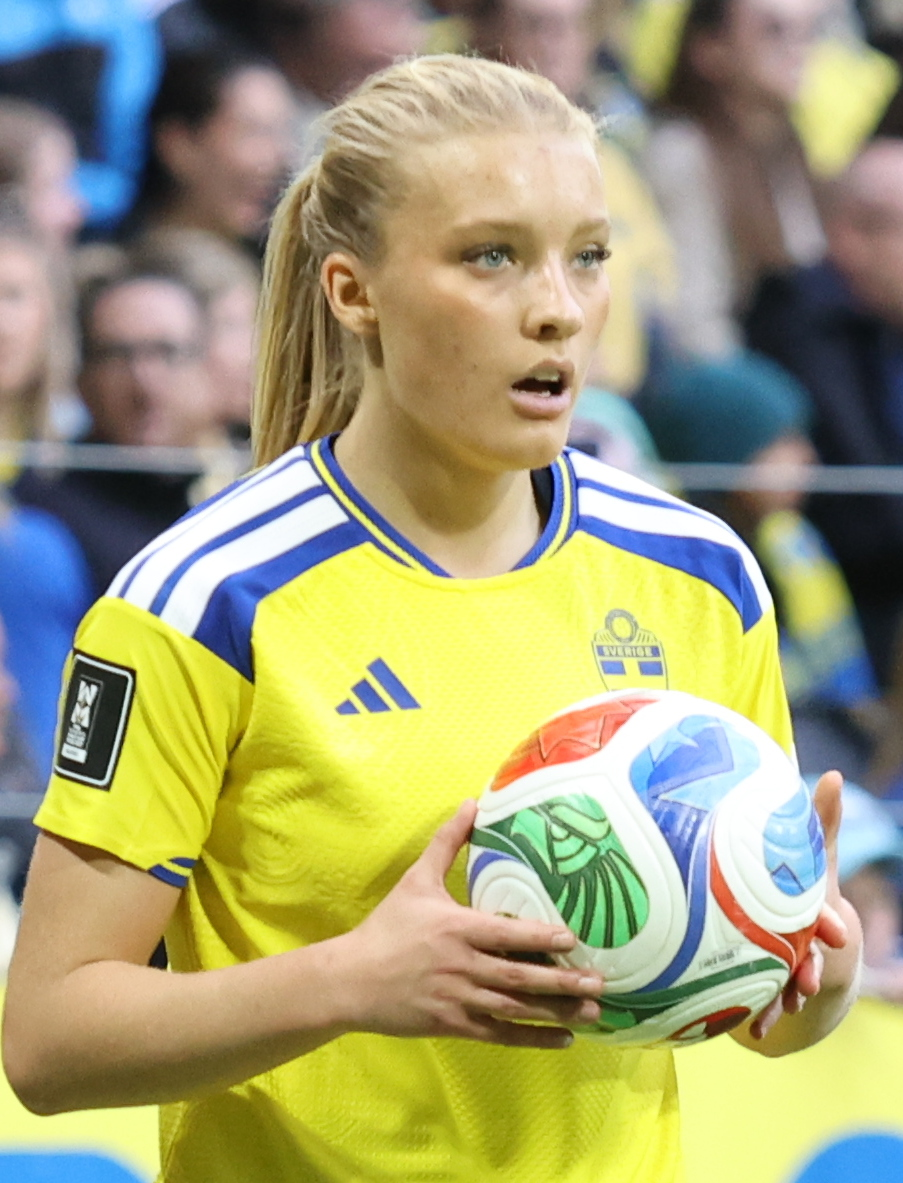
- Holmberg with Sweden in 2026

Personal information
- Full name: Smilla Hilma Holmberg
- Date of birth: 11 October 2006 (age 20)
- Place of birth: Stockholm, Sweden
- Height: 5 ft 7 in (1.70 m)
- Position: Right-back

Team information
- Current team: Arsenal
- Number: 31

Youth career
- 2013–2022: Hammarby IF

Senior career*
Years	Team	Apps	(Gls)
2022	Älvsjö	1	(0)
2022–2026	Hammarby IF	67	(8)
2026–	Arsenal	17	(3)

International career^{‡}
2022–2023	Sweden U17	16	(1)
2023–2025	Sweden U19	22	(1)
2024	Sweden U23	3	(0)
2025–	Sweden	17	(2)
- * Club domestic league appearances and goals as of 22 November 2026 ‡ National team caps and goals as of 14 October 2026

Smilla Hilma Holmberg (born 11 October 2006) is a Swedish professional footballer who plays as a right-back for Women's Super League club Arsenal and the Swedish national team.

== Early life ==
Smilla Holmberg was born on 11 October 2006 and grew up on Södermalm in Stockholm. She began playing football at the age of seven with Hammarby IF, having previously tried several other sports. Holmberg progressed through Hammarby's youth academy and made her senior debut for the club at the age of 15.

== Club career ==
Holmberg made one senior appearance for Älvsjö AIK in 2022 before joining Hammarby IF’s first team later the same year. In late 2022, she trained with Olympique Lyonnais during a visit to France while still under contract with Hammarby.

Holmberg debuted in a Svenska Cupen match in late 2022 and became a regular part of the squad during the 2023 season, contributing to the club’s Damallsvenskan and Svenska Cupen titles.

In May 2024, she extended her contract with Hammarby until the end of 2026. During the 2025 season, Holmberg emerged as one of the team's top scorers, registering four goals and one assist in the opening four league matches.

On 5 January 2026, it was announced Holmberg had signed for English side Arsenal. On 10 January, Holmberg made her Arsenal debut, coming on as a substitute in the 83rd minute, in a 0–0 draw against Manchester United. Later that year, on 29 April, she scored her first goals by netting a brace in a 7–0 win over Leicester City.

== International career ==
On 11 June 2025, Holmberg received her first call-up for the Sweden senior national team, when she was included in Peter Gerhardsson's 23-player squad for the UEFA Euro 2025 in Switzerland. Aged 18, she was the youngest player in the squad. A month later, on 12 July, she scored her first goal in a 4–1 win over Germany during the Euro 2025.

== Career statistics ==
=== Club ===
As of match played 22 November 2026

Appearances and goals by club, season and competition
Club	Season	League			National cup (Note: Includes Svenska Cupen and Women's FA Cup)		League cup (Note: Includes Women's League Cup)		Europe		Other		Total	
Club	Season	Division	Apps	Goals	Apps	Goals	Apps	Goals	Apps	Goals	Apps	Goals	Apps	Goals
Älvsjö AIK	2022	Elitettan	1	0	—		—		—		—		1	0
Hammarby IF	2022	Damallsvenskan	3	0	4	0	—		—		—		7	0
Hammarby IF	2023	Damallsvenskan	13	0	5	0	—		—		—		18	0
Hammarby IF	2024	Damallsvenskan	25	2	6	0	—		7 (Note: Appearances in UEFA Women's Champions League)	0	—		38	2
Hammarby IF	2025	Damallsvenskan	26	6	1	1	—		6 (Note: Two appearances in UEFA Women's Champions League, four appearances and one goal in UEFA Women's Europa Cup)	1	—		33	8
Hammarby IF	Total		67	8	16	1	0	0	13	1	0	0	96	10
Arsenal	2025–26	Women's Super League	9	2	3	0	1	0	6	0	2 (Note: Appearances in FIFA Women's Champions Cup)	0	21	2
Arsenal	2026–27	Women's Super League	8	1	0	0	—		3	0	—		11	1
Arsenal	Total		17	3	3	0	1	0	9	0	2	0	32	3
Career total			85	11	19	1	1	0	22	1	2	0	129	13

=== International ===
No.	Date	Venue	Opponent	Score	Result	Competition
1.	12 July 2025	Stadion Letzigrund, Zurich, Switzerland	Germany	2–1	4–1	UEFA Women's Euro 2025
2.	13 October 2026	Nationalarenan, Solna, Sweden	Lithuania	3–0	10–0	2027 FIFA Women's World Cup play-offs

== Honours ==
Hammarby IF

- Svenska Cupen: 2022–23, 2024–25
- Damallsvenskan: 2023

Arsenal

- FIFA Women's Champions Cup: 2026
