= Laia Codina =

Spanish footballer (born 2000)

- Codina in 2026

Personal information
- Full name: Laia Codina Panedas
- Date of birth: 22 January 2000 (age 26)
- Place of birth: Campllong, Spain
- Height: 1.70 m (5 ft 7 in)
- Position: Centre-back

Team information
- Current team: West Ham United
- Number: 3

Youth career
- 2014–2017: Barcelona

Senior career*
| Years | Team | Apps | (Gls) |
| 2017–2020 | Barcelona B | 15+ | (2+) |
| 2019–2023 | Barcelona | 29 | (2) |
| 2021–2022 | → AC Milan (loan) | 14 | (0) |
| 2023–2026 | Arsenal | 27 | (0) |
| 2026– | West Ham United | 1 | (0) |

International career^{‡}
| 2018–2019 | Spain U19 | 10 | (0) |
| 2021–2022 | Spain U23 | 3 | (1) |
| 2022– | Spain | 26 | (2) |
Medal record
Women's football
Representing Spain
FIFA Women's World Cup
| Winner | 2023 Australia–New Zealand |
UEFA Women's Nations League
| Winner | 2024 France–Netherlands–Spain |
UEFA Women's Under-19 Championship
| Winner | 2018 Switzerland |
- * Club domestic league appearances and goals as of 15:30, 15 September 2026 (UTC) ‡ National team caps and goals as of 15:30, 15 September 2026 (UTC)

Laia Codina Panedas (Catalan pronunciation: [ˈlajə kuˈðinə]; born 22 January 2000) is a Spanish professional footballer who plays as a centre-back for Women's Super League club West Ham United and the Spain national team. She previously played for Spanish team Barcelona and had a loan spell with AC Milan and most recently played for WSL side Arsenal. She has represented Spain in multiple youth national teams.

== Early life and education ==
Born in Campllong, Province of Girona, Catalonia, Codina began playing football when she was four years old. As a child, she was a player in the lower categories of the Unió Deportiva Cassà, a team from the Girona municipality of Cassá de la Selva. Until the age of 14, she played on boys' teams. In 2014, she signed for Barça.

Codina studies journalism at the Universidad de Vic.

== Club career ==
=== Barcelona ===
In 2014, Codina signed for Barcelona to play in the lower categories. In 2017, at the age of 16, she made the leap to Barcelona B. Codina was one of the leaders of the reserve team, becoming the captain the same season they were promoted to the Segunda División Pro.

In the summer of 2019, the club announced that Codina would be in the first-team dynamics, although would be kept mainly as a reserve team player until the end of the season. In June 2020, her contract was extended until 2022, in addition to her definitive jump to the first team the following season.

On 13 October 2019, she made her league debut in a match against Sporting de Huelva. Just four days later, she made her UEFA Champions League debut in a round of 16 match against Minsk.

In her first season as a first-team player, Codina wore the number 3, which she had already worn in the subsidiary. In November 2020, she underwent surgery after suffering an injury to the patellar cartilage in her right knee during a match of the Spanish U-20 team. In March 2021, she began playing again after four months out from injury recovery.

==== Loan to Milan ====
On 29 July 2021, Codina signed a one year loan deal with Italian club A.C. Milan.

=== Arsenal ===
On 29 August 2023, Codina signed for English Women's Super League club Arsenal. In her first season, she made 16 appearances for the club and scored her first goal against Reading in the Continental Cup.

Following her first season at Arsenal, Codina received a new shirt number, changing from number 27 to number 5.

In September 2024, talking about her move to the English League, alongside Mariona Caldentey, they both said that since winning the 2023 FIFA World Cup, nothing has changed in the Spanish leagues and they weren't moving in the right direction. However, since England won the UEFA Euro 2022, the Women's Super League and women’s football in general had moved in the right direction, with 1,500 new teams registered, prompting their move to Arsenal. They also suggested that more Spanish players are wanting to make the move.

On 11 May 2026, it was announced that Codina would leave Arsenal at the end of the season.

=== West Ham United ===
On 19 June 2026, it was announced that Codina had signed for West Ham United on a three year deal.

== International career ==
Codina has been a regular on Spain's youth national teams, including the under-17, under-19, and under-20 squads. In the summer of 2018, she was selected by Jorge Vilda to compete at the 2018 UEFA Under-19 Championship. Codina was proclaimed a European Under-19 champion with the Spanish team after defeating the German team in the final.

In July 2019, Codina was selected by Pedro López to represent Spain at the 2019 UEFA Under-19 Championship in Scotland. The team was eliminated in the semifinals by France.

Upon arriving at the 2023 FIFA World Cup, Codina and her teammates were pictured performing the Haka during training, causing upset for co-hosts New Zealand. She would go on to score an own goal against Switzerland in the round of 16, but would rectify it by scoring a goal in the same half. The Spanish team went on to win the World Cup, ahead of Euro 2022 winners England. During the presentation, the Spanish football president kissed another player, Jenni Hermoso on the lips, without consent, leading to 89 players including Codina, refusing to play for Spain unless he stepped down. He eventually resigned from his post.

In April 2024, Codina withdrew from the Spanish squad ahead of their Euro 2025 qualifier, against Czech Republic, due to muscle discomfort, as a precaution.

Codina was chosen to represent Spain at the 2024 Summer Olympics. The Spanish team finished just outside the medals in fourth place after losing the bronze medal match to Germany.

Codina was ruled out of the UEFA Euro 2025, due to an ongoing pelvic injury, and eventually underwent surgery on the injury. Prior to this she hadn't started a match for Arsenal since February 19.

== Career statistics ==
=== Club ===
As of match played 12 September 2026

Appearances and goals by club, season and competition
| Club | Season | League | | | National cup (Note: Includes Copa de la Reina, Coppa Italia, Women's FA Cup) | | League cup | | UWCL | | Other | | Total | |
| Club | Season | Division | Apps | Goals | Apps | Goals | Apps | Goals | Apps | Goals | Apps | Goals | Apps | Goals |
|---|---|---|---|---|---|---|---|---|---|---|---|---|---|---|
| Barcelona | 2019–20 | Primera División | 4 | 0 | 0 | 0 | — | | 1 | 0 | 0 | 0 | 5 | 0 |
| Barcelona | 2020–21 | Primera División | 12 | 1 | 2 | 0 | — | | 0 | 0 | 0 | 0 | 14 | 1 |
| Barcelona | 2022–23 | Primera División | 13 | 1 | 1 | 0 | — | | 2 | 0 | 1 (Note: Appearances in Supercopa de España) | 0 | 17 | 1 |
| Barcelona | Total | | 29 | 2 | 3 | 0 | 0 | 0 | 3 | 0 | 1 | 0 | 36 | 2 |
| AC Milan (loan) | 2021–22 | Serie A | 13 | 0 | 3 | 0 | — | | 1 | 0 | 2 (Note: Appearances in Supercoppa Italiana) | 0 | 19 | 0 |
| Arsenal | 2023–24 | Women's Super League | 8 | 0 | 2 | 0 | 6 | 1 | 0 | 0 | — | | 16 | 1 |
| Arsenal | 2024–25 | Women's Super League | 7 | 0 | 2 | 1 | 1 | 0 | 8 | 1 | — | | 18 | 2 |
| Arsenal | 2025–26 | Women's Super League | 12 | 0 | 3 | 0 | 2 | 1 | 7 | 0 | 2 (Note: Appearances in FIFA Women's Club World Cup) | 0 | 26 | 1 |
| Arsenal | Total | | 27 | 0 | 7 | 1 | 9 | 2 | 15 | 1 | 2 | 0 | 60 | 4 |
| West Ham United | 2026–27 | Women's Super League | 1 | 0 | 0 | 0 | 0 | 0 | 0 | 0 | 0 | 0 | 1 | 0 |
| Career total | | | 69 | 2 | 13 | 1 | 9 | 2 | 19 | 1 | 5 | 0 | 115 | 6 |

=== International ===
As of match played 9 June 2026

Appearances and goals by national team and year
| National team | Year | Apps | Goals |
|---|---|---|---|
| Spain | 2022 | 1 | 1 |
| Spain | 2023 | 10 | 1 |
| Spain | 2024 | 10 | 0 |
| Spain | 2025 | 4 | 0 |
| Spain | 2026 | 3 | 0 |
| Total | | 28 | 2 |

Scores and results list Spain's goal tally first, score column indicates score after each Codina goal.

List of international goals scored by Laia Codina
| No. | Date | Venue | Opponent | Score | Result | Competition |
|---|---|---|---|---|---|---|
| 1 | 11 October 2022 | El Sadar Stadium, Pamplona, Spain | United States | 1–0 | 2–0 | Friendly |
| 2 | 5 August 2023 | Eden Park, Auckland, New Zealand | Switzerland | 4–1 | 5–1 | 2023 FIFA Women's World Cup |

== Honours ==
FC Barcelona

- Primera División: 2019–20, 2020–21, 2022–23
- UEFA Women's Champions League: 2020–21, 2022–23
- Copa de la Reina: 2021
- Supercopa de España: 2020

Arsenal

- FA Women's League Cup: 2023–24
- UEFA Women's Champions League: 2024–25
- FIFA Women's Champions Cup: 2026

Spain U19

- UEFA Women's Under-19 Championship: 2018

Spain

- FIFA Women's World Cup: 2023
- UEFA Women's Nations League: 2023–24
