= Daphne van Domselaar =

Dutch footballer (born 2000)

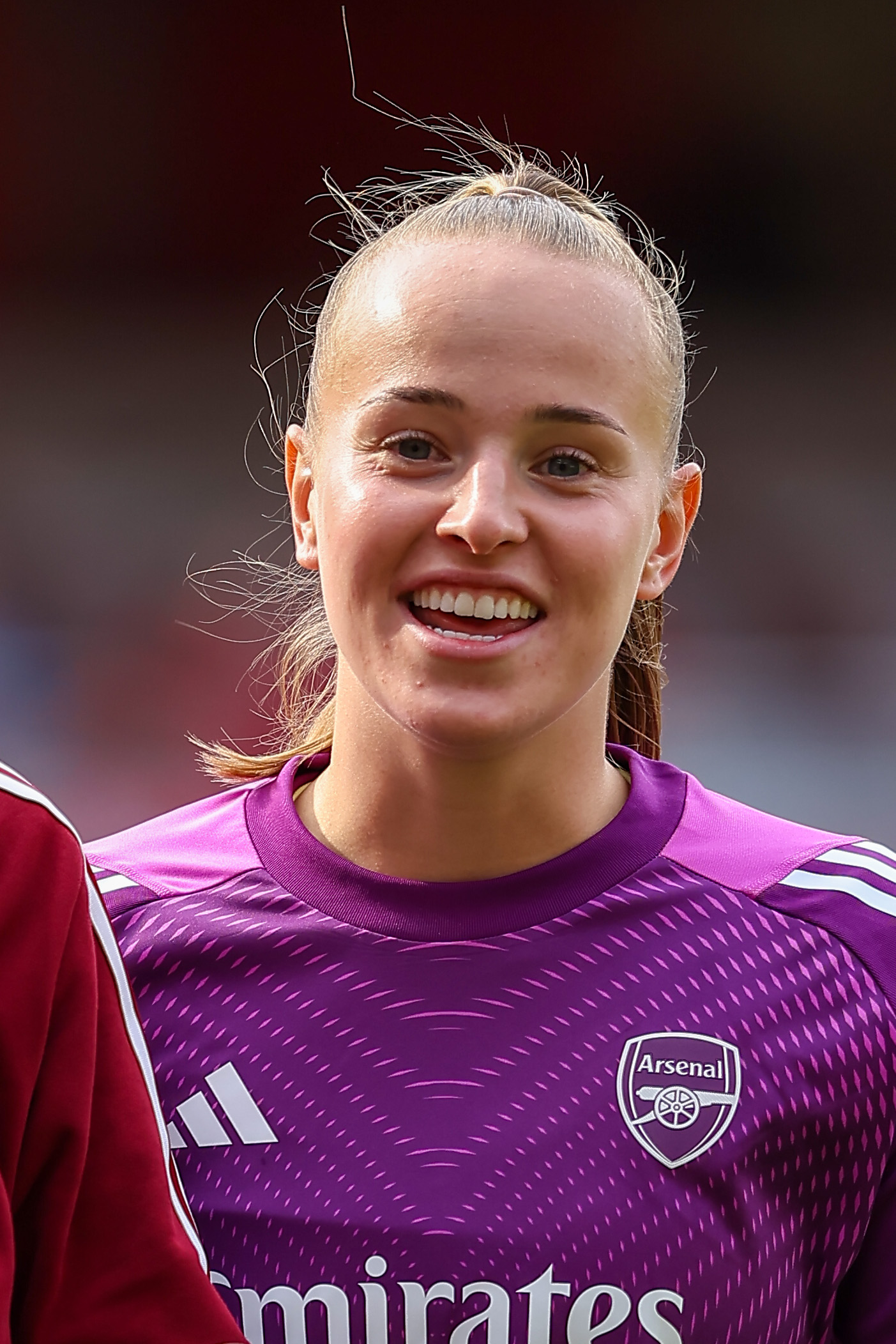
- Van Domselaar with Arsenal in 2025

Personal information
- Full name: Daphne van Domselaar
- Date of birth: 6 March 2000 (age 26)
- Place of birth: Beverwijk, Netherlands
- Height: 1.76 m (5 ft 9 in)
- Position: Goalkeeper

Team information
- Current team: Arsenal
- Number: 1

Youth career
- LSVV
- Telstar

Senior career*
Years	Team	Apps	(Gls)
2017–2023	Twente	78	(0)
2023–2024	Aston Villa	14	(0)
2024–	Arsenal	30	(0)

International career^{‡}
2015	Netherlands U15	3	(0)
2015–2016	Netherlands U16	5	(0)
2015–2017	Netherlands U17	14	(0)
2017–2019	Netherlands U19	26	(0)
2019–2020	Netherlands U23	3	(0)
2022–	Netherlands	39	(0)
- * Club domestic league appearances and goals as of 22 November 2026 ‡ National team caps and goals as of 18 April 2026

Daphne van Domselaar (Dutch: [ˈdɑfnə vɑn ˈdɔmsəlaːr]; born 6 March 2000) is a Dutch professional footballer who plays as a goalkeeper for Women's Super League club Arsenal and the Netherlands national team. Prior to her Arsenal move, she played for Twente and Aston Villa.

== Club career ==
=== Youth career ===
At the age of 11, Van Domselaar started playing football at LSVV in Zuid-Scharwoude. In the team that she joined, the girls played without a regular keeper. However, after Van Domselaar took her turn as goalkeeper, she did not leave that position but stayed in it. The LSVV goalkeeping coach immediately recognised her great talent. Moreover, he noted that she had learned a lot at the volleyball club from which she had come. Van Domselaar then played for four years with the boys of LSVV and for two years with Telstar's youth academy.

In her second year at Telstar, she was the one-off reserve keeper of the senior team in their away match against PSV on 4 February 2017. Telstar continued as VV Alkmaar in the following season. Soccerway erroneously reports that Van Domselaar played with VV Alkmaar in the 2016–17 season.

=== Senior career ===
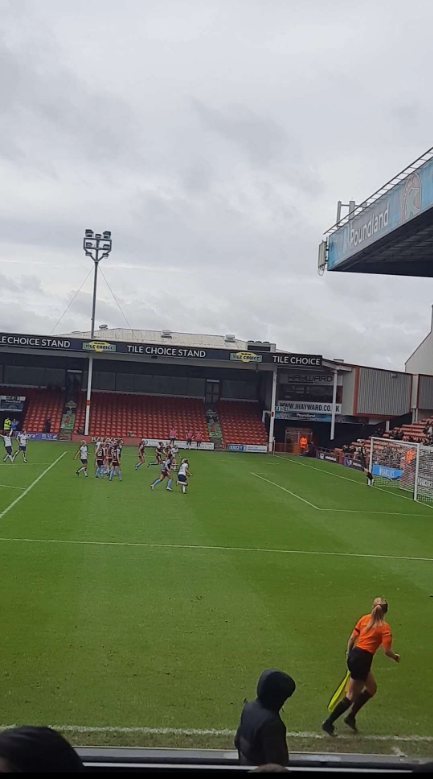
Daphne van Domselaar saving a Tottenham Hotspur free kick against Aston Villa, 21 October 2023; Aston Villa 2 - 4 Tottenham Hotspur.

Van Domselaar started her professional career with FC Twente in the 2017–18 season. In the first two seasons she was reserve goalkeeper behind Nicky Evrard. She made her debut in the Eredivisie on 22 December 2017 in the match against Heerenveen, when after 20 minutes Evrard was shown a red card. From the 2019–20 season, Van Domselaar was FC Twente's first-choice goalkeeper.

Her first trainer at FC Twente, Tommy Stroot, called her a “pure natural talent”. After the UEFA Women's Euro 2022 championship, various foreign clubs were interested in Van Domselaar, but she decided to stay with FC Twente for the 2022–23 season. She did say that she hoped for a transfer to “a very nice club outside the Netherlands” in 2023. At the end of 2022, she was the only Eredivisie player included in The Guardian's annual list of the 100 best female football players in the world.

On 16 June 2023, Women's Super League club Aston Villa announced the signing of Van Domselaar on a three-year deal until 2026. In March 2024, Van Domselaar underwent surgery on her hip, and would miss the remainder of the WSL season.

On 31 July 2024, it was announced that Arsenal had signed Van Domselaar after triggering a substantial buyout clause in her Villa contract. On 9 March 2025, Arsenal were knocked out of the FA Cup quarterfinals against Liverpool, after an unfortunate own goal from Van Domselaar. After suffering a concussion from the FA cup match against Liverpool Van Domselaar missed Arsenal's next two matches. She returned to the squad against Liverpool in their league match, keeping a clean sheet in a 4-0 Arsenal win. She won the 2026 WSL Save of the Season award for a save she made during a win over Brighton.

Alongside her football career, she has studied for a Certificate in Football Psychology at the Professional Footballers' Association business school.

== International career ==
Van Domselaar's first cap was for a friendly against Belgium U15 on 18 March 2015. The UEFA Women's Under-17 Championship in May 2017 was her first major tournament. With the Dutch team she reached the semifinals. Her performance in the Netherlands U17 team drew the attention of Tommy Stroot, who brought her to FC Twente in the summer of 2017.

Van Domselaar made her senior team debut during the Tournoi de France on 19 February 2022 in a 3–0 win against Finland. In July 2022, she was named in the Dutch squad for the European Championship held in England. In the first group match against Sweden, the starting goalkeeper Sari van Veenendaal was injured, and Van Domselaar came on as a substitute in the 20th minute. She played in goal for the rest of the tournament. Up to and including the quarterfinals, in which the Netherlands team were eliminated by France, she was the star player of the Dutch national team. On 31 May 2023, Van Domselaar was named as part of the Netherlands provisional squad for the 2023 FIFA Women's World Cup.

== Career statistics ==
=== Club ===
As of match played 22 November 2026

Appearances and goals by club, season and competition
Club	Season	League			National cup (Note: Includes KNVB Women's Cup, Women's FA Cup)		League cup (Note: Includes Eredivisie Cup, FA Women's League Cup)		Continental		Other		Total	
Club	Season	Division	Apps	Goals	Apps	Goals	Apps	Goals	Apps	Goals	Apps	Goals	Apps	Goals
Twente	2017–18	Eredivisie	3	0	1	0	—		—		—		4	0
Twente	2018–19	Eredivisie	4	0	3	0	—		—		—		7	0
Twente	2019–20	Eredivisie	12	0	1	0	4	0	7 (Note: Appearances in UEFA Women's Champions League)	0	—		24	0
Twente	2020–21	Eredivisie	18	0	2	0	3	0	—		—		23	0
Twente	2021–22	Eredivisie	21	0	2	0	1	0	4	0	—		28	0
Twente	2022–23	Eredivisie	20	0	5	0	1	0	2	0	1 (Note: Appearance in Dutch Women's Super Cup)	0	29	0
Twente	Total		78	0	14	0	9	0	13	0	1	0	115	0
Aston Villa	2023–24	WSL	14	0	0	0	1	0	—		—		15	0
Arsenal	2024–25	WSL	15	0	1	0	1	0	7	0	—		24	0
Arsenal	2025–26	WSL	14	0	1	0	0	0	9	0	1 (Note: Appearance in FIFA Women's Champions Cup)	0	25	0
Arsenal	2026–27	WSL	1	0	0	0	—		0	0	—		1	0
Arsenal	Total		30	0	2	0	1	0	16	0	1	0	50	0
Career total			122	0	16	0	11	0	29	0	2	0	180	0

=== International ===
As of match played 18 April 2026

Appearances and goals by national team and year
National team	Year	Apps	Goals
Netherlands	2022	9	0
Netherlands	2023	15	0
Netherlands	2024	5	0
Netherlands	2025	8	0
Netherlands	2026	2	0
Total		39	0

== Honours ==
Twente

- Vrouwen Eredivisie: 2018–19, 2020–21, 2021–22
- KNVB Women's Cup: 2022–23
- Eredivisie Cup: 2019–20, 2021–22, 2022–23
- Dutch Women's Super Cup: 2022

Arsenal

- UEFA Women's Champions League: 2024–25
- FIFA Women's Champions Cup: 2026

Individual

- UEFA Women's Champions League Team of the Season: 2024–25
