= Victoria Pelova =

Dutch footballer (born 1999)

- Pelova in 2026

Personal information
- Full name: Victoria Pelova
- Date of birth: 3 June 1999 (age 27)
- Place of birth: Delft, Netherlands
- Height: 1.63 m (5 ft 4 in)
- Position: Midfielder

Team information
- Current team: Tottenham Hotspur
- Number: 23

Youth career
- 2006–2016: DSV Concordia

Senior career*
Years	Team	Apps	(Gls)
2016–2019	ADO Den Haag	67	(27)
2019–2023	Ajax	64	(11)
2023–2026	Arsenal	56	(4)
2026–	Tottenham Hotspur	8	(6)

International career^{‡}
2017–2018	Netherlands U19	15	(8)
2018	Netherlands U20	6	(2)
2018–	Netherlands	72	(10)
Medal record
Women's football
Representing the Netherlands
FIFA Women's World Cup
Runner-up	2019 France
- * Club domestic league appearances and goals as of 20:43, 4 November 2026 (UTC) ‡ National team caps and goals as of 9 October 2026

Victoria Pelova (Dutch pronunciation: [vɪkˈtoːrijaː peːˈloːvaː]; born 3 June 1999) is a Dutch professional footballer who plays as a midfielder for Women's Super League club Tottenham Hotspur and the Netherlands national team.

== Club career ==
Pelova started playing football for boys' youth teams in her birthplace Delft with DSV Concordia and was signed by Dutch Eredivisie club ADO Den Haag for the 2016–17 season. In her freshman season, she finished fourth with ADO, scoring seven goals as her team's second-best scorer. For the 2019–20 season, she moved to Ajax Amsterdam in the Eredivisie, where she received a three-year contract. In the 2020–21 UEFA Women's Champions League she failed with Ajax in the sixteenth final at Bayern Munich, since both games were lost (3–1 and 3–0).

She lost in the last round with Ajax in 2022–23 UEFA Women's Champions League qualifying at Arsenal, who she joined in January 2023.

In June 2024, Pelova suffered an ACL rupture while on international duty.

On 12 February 2025, Pelova played her first minutes, following her ACL injury, for the Arsenal PGA U21 team against Manchester United, and made it on the scoresheet.

On 22 March 2025, 308 days after her last WSL match for Arsenal, Pelova came on as a substitute in the 74th minute of their 4–0 win over Liverpool.

On 11 May 2026, it was announced that Pelova would be leaving Arsenal upon the expiry of her contract at the end of the 2025–26 season.

On 25 June 2026, it was announced that Pelova had signed with WSL club Tottenham Hotspur.

== International career ==
In April 2017, she qualified with the U-19 team for the 2017 Under-19 European Championship. In this she played two group games and in the 3–2 lost semi-final against Spain, where she scored the interim 1–1. In October 2017 and April 2018 she took part again with the U-19 team in the two qualifying rounds for the 2018 Under-19 European Championship. She was then able to qualify with her team for the finals in Switzerland, but did not take part. Instead, she was part of the squad for the 2018 U-20 World Cup, which took place just days later, for which the Dutch had qualified for the first time as semi-finalists of the U-19 European Championship in 2017. There she featured in the three group games and the quarter-finals, lost 2–1 to England, where she gave her team a 1–0 lead.

Already in January 2018 she had her first assignment in the senior national team. She came on as a substitute in the 81st minute of the 2–0 loss to Spain on 20 January. Her second mission followed a year later. She came on as a second-half substitute in the 2–1 win over South Africa in Cape Town. They met Spain again in the 2019 Algarve Cup, coming on as a substitute in the 58th minute and losing again 2–0.

After these three international matches, she was nominated as the youngest player for the Dutch World Cup squad.

She was also nominated for the 2020 Olympics, which was postponed by a year due to the COVID-19 pandemic. At the Olympics she scored her first international goal in the Netherlands opening match against Zambia. She came on as a substitute in the three group games and quarterfinals against USA. In the victories against Zambia (10–3) and China (8–2) she scored one goal each.

On 31 May, she was nominated for the European Championship finals. At the European Championship, she played in the three group games and in the quarter-finals, which they lost to France in extra time. In the group game against Switzerland, she scored the goal to make it 3–1 and gave the assist to make it 4–1.

On 30 June 2023, she was named as part of the Netherlands squad for the 2023 FIFA Women's World Cup.

== Personal life ==
Pelova is of Bulgarian descent. She studied applied mathematics at Delft University of Technology. During her childhood, she excelled in several different sports including chess, snowboarding, and tennis.

== Career statistics ==
=== Club ===
As of match played 1 November 2026

Appearances and goals by club, season and competition
Club	Season	League			National cup (Note: Includes KNVB Women's Cup, FA Women's Cup)		League cup (Note: Includes Eredivisie Cup, WSL Players Cup)		Europe		Other		Total	
Club	Season	Division	Apps	Goals	Apps	Goals	Apps	Goals	Apps	Goals	Apps	Goals	Apps	Goals
ADO Den Haag	2016–17	Eredivisie	26	7	—		—		—		—		26	7
ADO Den Haag	2017–18	Eredivisie	24	11	—		—		—		—		24	11
ADO Den Haag	2018–19	Eredivisie	17	9	—		—		—		—		17	9
ADO Den Haag	Total		67	27	0	0	0	0	0	0	0	0	67	27
Ajax	2019–20	Eredivisie	12	1	—		—		—		—		12	1
Ajax	2020–21	Eredivisie	20	1	2	0	5	1	2 (Note: Appearances in UEFA Women's Champions League)	0	—		29	2
Ajax	2021–22	Eredivisie	24	6	4	1	2	2	—		—		30	9
Ajax	2022–23	Eredivisie	8	3	1	0	0	0	4	1	—		13	4
Ajax	Total		64	11	7	1	7	3	6	1	0	0	84	16
Arsenal	2022–23	Women's Super League	12	1	2	1	3	0	4	0	—		21	2
Arsenal	2023–24	Women's Super League	22	2	2	0	6	0	2	0	—		32	2
Arsenal	2024–25	Women's Super League	5	1	0	0	0	0	1	0	—		6	1
Arsenal	2025–26	Women's Super League	17	0	2	1	2	0	7	0	2 (Note: Appearances in FIFA Women's Champions Cup)	0	30	1
Arsenal	Total		56	4	6	2	11	0	14	0	2	0	89	6
Tottenham Hotspur	2026–27	Women's Super League	8	6	0	0	2	0	—		—		10	6
Career total			195	48	13	3	20	3	20	1	2	0	250	55

=== International ===
As of match played 9 October 2026

Appearances and goals by national team and year
National team	Year	Apps	Goals
Netherlands	2018	1	0
Netherlands	2019	6	0
Netherlands	2020	1	0
Netherlands	2021	12	2
Netherlands	2022	15	1
Netherlands	2023	16	1
Netherlands	2024	4	0
Netherlands	2025	12	2
Netherlands	2026	5	4
Total		72	10

Scores and results list Netherlands' goal tally first, score column indicates score after each Pelova goal.

List of international goals scored by Victoria Pelova
No.	Date	Venue	Opponent	Score	Result	Competition
1	21 July 2021	Miyagi Stadium, Rifu, Japan	Zambia	10–1	10–3	2020 Summer Olympics
2	27 July 2021	Nissan Stadium, Yokohama, Japan	China	7–2	8–2	2020 Summer Olympics
3	17 July 2022	Bramall Lane, Sheffield, England	Switzerland	3–1	4–1	UEFA Women's Euro 2022
4	3 July 2023	Parkstad Limburg Stadion, Kerkrade, Netherlands	Belgium	4–0	5–0	Friendly
5	5 July 2025	Stadion Allmend, Lucerne, Switzerland	Wales	2–0	3–0	UEFA Women's Euro 2025
6	13 July 2025	St. Jakob-Park, Basel, Switzerland	France	1–1	2–5	UEFA Women's Euro 2025
7	5 June 2026	Páirc Uí Chaoimh, Cork, Republic of Ireland	Republic of Ireland	2–2	2–3	2027 FIFA Women's World Cup qualification
8	9 October 2026	Pancho Aréna, Felcsút, Hungary	Hungary	3–0	8–0	2027 FIFA Women's World Cup qualification
9	9 October 2026	Pancho Aréna, Felcsút, Hungary	Hungary	6–0	8–0	2027 FIFA Women's World Cup qualification
10	9 October 2026	Pancho Aréna, Felcsút, Hungary	Hungary	7–0	8–0	2027 FIFA Women's World Cup qualification

== Honours ==
Ajax

- Eredivisie (women): 2022–23
- KNVB Women's Cup: 2021–22
- Eredivisie Cup: 2020–21

Arsenal

- FA Women's League Cup: 2022–23, 2023–24
- UEFA Women's Champions League: 2024–25
- FIFA Women's Champions Cup: 2026

Individual

- UEFA Women's Under-19 Championship team of the tournament: 2017
