= Anneke Borbe =

German association football player (born 2000)

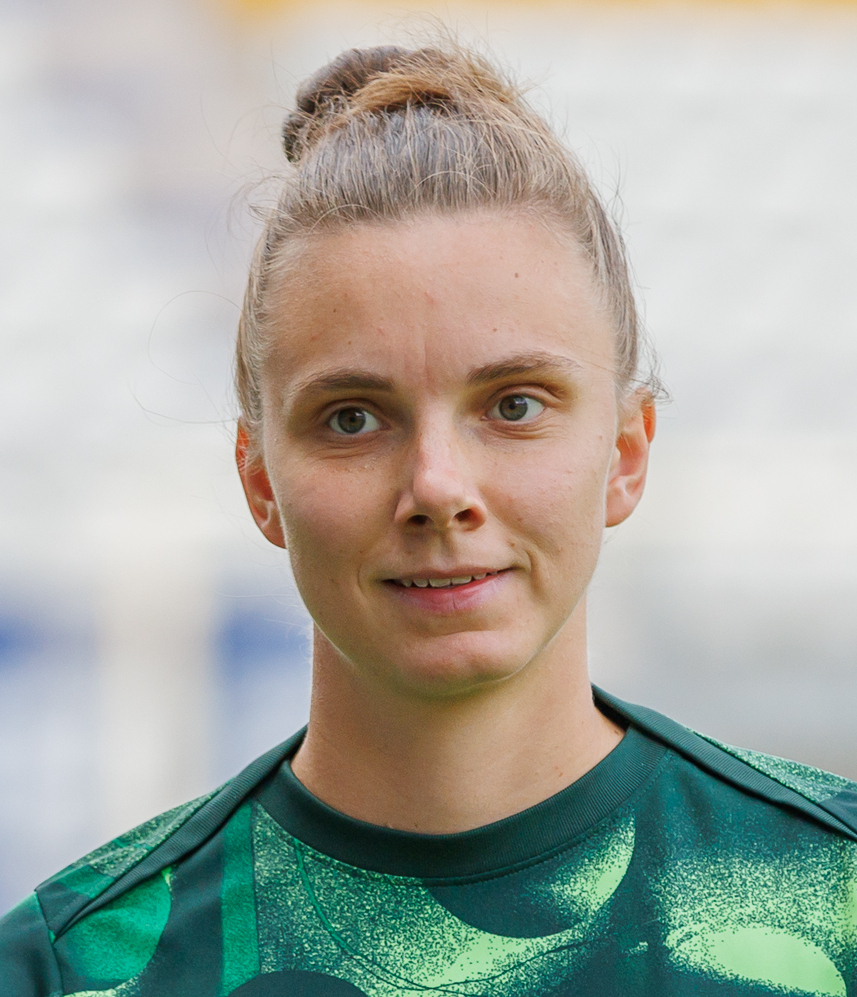
- Borbe with VfL Wolfsburg in 2024

Personal information
- Full name: Anneke Borbe
- Date of birth: 17 September 2000 (age 26)
- Place of birth: Pinneberg, Germany
- Height: 1.80 m (5 ft 11 in)
- Position: Goalkeeper

Team information
- Current team: Arsenal
- Number: 28

Youth career
- SV Lieth
- –2015: SC Nienstedten
- 2015–2017: Werder Bremen

Senior career*
Years	Team	Apps	(Gls)
2016–2023	Werder Bremen	77	(0)
2023–2025	VfL Wolfsburg	10	(0)
2023–2025	VfL Wolfsburg II	6	(0)
2025–	Arsenal	10	(0)

International career^{‡}
2014	Germany U15	1	(0)
2016	Germany U16	2	(0)
2016–2017	Germany U17	5	(0)
2018	Germany U19	2	(0)
2025–	Germany U23	2	(0)
- * Club domestic league appearances and goals as of 23:35, 4 October 2026 (UTC) ‡ National team caps and goals as of 9 June 2026

Anneke Borbe (German: [ˈanə.kə ˈboːbə]; born 17 September 2000) is a German professional footballer who plays as a goalkeeper for Women's Super League club Arsenal and has represented Germany at youth levels.

== Youth career ==
Borbe was born in Pinneberg. She began playing soccer at SV Lieth and SC Nienstedten, where she played in mixed teams with boys. In 2015, she joined Werder Bremen's youth department. At first she commuted weekly from Pinneberg before finally moving into a shared apartment in Bremen with teammate Nina Lührßen. With the SVW juniors she played 26 games in the B-Junior Bundesliga. She also played four times for the Hamburg U16 state team.

== Club career ==
=== VfL Wolfsburg ===
As a sixteen-year-old, Borbe made her debut in the Frauen-Bundesliga at the beginning of September 2017. During the 2017–18 season she played a total of 14 times and ultimately held the league with Werder. The following year she was in goal 15 times and was relegated with the team to the 2. Frauen-Bundesliga at the end of the 2018–19 season. Werder dominated the 2019–20 second division season and went undefeated, Borbe playing in eight games. Since then, Borbe has been established as the starting goalkeeper for the team. After the 8th matchday of the 2022–23 season, she injured her hand and was initially replaced by Hannah Etzold. In mid-March 2023 she was in goal again for the team for the first time in the game against Eintracht Frankfurt.

At the end of February 2023, VfL Wolfsburg signed Borbe on a free transfer for the 2023–24 season. Her contract ran until 2025.

=== Arsenal ===
On 15 July 2025, it was announced that Borbe had signed with Women's Super League club Arsenal upon the expiration of her contract at VfL Wolfsburg. Borbe will wear the number 28 at Arsenal.

On 6 December 2025, Borbe made her debut for Arsenal, replacing injured Daphne van Domselaar, in a 2–1 victory over Liverpool.

== International career ==
Borbe went through the DFB junior teams from U15 to U19 and made a total of ten appearances. Among other things, she took part in the Nordic Cup tournament and several European Championship qualifiers.

== Personal life ==
Borbe attended high school in Bremen-Obervieland. She cites Nadine Angerer as her role model.

== Honours ==
Werder Bremen

- 2. Frauen-Bundesliga: 2019–20

Arsenal

- FIFA Women's Champions Cup: 2026
