= Lisa Baum =

German footballer (born 2006)

- Baum in 2026

Personal information
- Date of birth: 26 November 2006 (age 19)
- Place of birth: Dar es Salaam, Tanzania
- Height: 1.70 m (5 ft 7 in)
- Position: Winger

Team information
- Current team: Arsenal
- Number: 19

Youth career
- MTV Ahrensbök
- TSV Pansdorf
- 2021–2022: Hamburger SV

Senior career*
Years	Team	Apps	(Gls)
2022–2025	Hamburger SV	59	(17)
2025–2026	RB Leipzig	25	(5)
2026–	Arsenal	11	(2)

International career^{‡}
2021–2022	Germany U16	7	(0)
2022–2023	Germany U17	11	(1)
2023–2025	Germany U19	12	(2)
2024	Germany U20	11	(1)
2025–	Germany U23	5	(0)
2026–	Germany	1	(0)
- * Club domestic league appearances and goals as of 20:15, 22 November 2026 (UTC) ‡ National team caps and goals as of 22:05, 17 October 2026 (UTC)

Lisa Baum (born 26 November 2006) is a professional footballer who plays as a winger for Women's Super League club Arsenal. Born in Tanzania, she plays for the Germany national team. She has previously played for Frauen-Bundesliga clubs Hamburger SV and RB Leipzig.

== Early life ==
Baum was born in Dar es Salaam, Tanzania, to a German father and Tanzanian mother. Her family moved to Germany when Baum was four years old, settling in the Schleswig-Holstein municipality of Ahrensbök. Baum began playing football shortly afterwards, starting off with local club MTV Ahrensbök. She then moved to TSV Pansdorf, where she was the only girl on the boys' state league team. Baum received an education at the Am Heidberg school concurrently with her football career.

In 2021, Baum joined Hamburger SV's youth academy. She often trained both with Hamburger SV and TSV Pansdorf, with the two clubs coordinating which squad would get to use Baum's services on matchdays. Later on in 2021, Baum helped lift HSV's under-17 squad to a German national championship, scoring the opening goal of the title match.

== Club career ==
On 16 August 2022, Hamburger SV signed Baum to a first-team contract lasting until 2025. In her first season with the squad, Baum helped HSV gain promotion to the 2. Frauen-Bundesliga. She scored 6 goals in 25 league appearances the following campaign, her first in the German second division. In the 2024–25 season, Baum was a regular starter and posted positive performances in both league play and the DFB-Pokal. Her efforts helped HSV reach the semifinals of the DFB-Pokal and gain promotion to the Frauen-Bundesliga for the following season.

Baum chose not to move up to the Frauen-Bundesliga with HSV, instead joining RB Leipzig on a free transfer in May 2025 for her first taste of first-division football. She also fielded offers from multiple other clubs, including league champions Bayern Munich. On 6 September 2025, Baum made her Bundesliga debut, participating in Leipzig's season-opening victory over 1. FC Köln. Later on that month, she faced off against her former club, Hamburger SV, for the first time; despite having an opportunity to score, she was not able to lift Leipzig to victory over the Bundesliga newcomers. Baum went on to have a strong first season with Leipzig, reportedly gaining strong interest from various successful European clubs. She had made 27 appearances across all competitions and scored 5 goals across the campaign. Ahead of the 2026–27 season, RB Leipzig revealed that Baum would be departing from the club.

On 14 July 2026, Baum was announced to have joined English club Arsenal on a permanent transfer, with the BBC reporting that Baum had signed a three-year contract with a one-year extension option. She made her Women's Super League debut on 6 September, starting and scoring a goal in Arsenal's season-opening win over Brighton & Hove Albion.

== International career ==
Baum has gained extensive experience with the German youth national teams, earning multiple caps at each age group. In 2024, she played in every match for the under-20s at the FIFA U-20 Women's World Cup, where Germany were eliminated in the quarterfinals by the United States. Earlier that year, Baum scored her first goal for the U20s, striking 96 seconds into a 4–0 win over Canada.

Christian Wück handed Baum her first call-up to the senior national team in September 2026. On 9 October 2026, Baum made her senior international debut, coming on as a halftime substitute in a 4–1 friendly win over Australia.

== Personal life ==
Baum is a childhood fan of Bayern Munich. She also supports Barcelona. In 2022, her brother, Dennis, who had introduced her to football, died in a car accident. Baum has since taken up the habit of writing a meaningful word on a piece of tape and attaching it to her wrist before each match, often to remind her of her late brother.

== Career statistics ==
=== International ===
As of 9 October 2026

Appearances and goals by national team and year
National team	Year	Apps	Goals
Germany	2026	1	0
Total		1	0
