= Maddy Earl =

English footballer (born 2006)

Personal information
- Full name: Madison Ava Earl
- Date of birth: 3 November 2006 (age 20)
- Place of birth: England
- Position: Midfielder

Team information
- Current team: Arsenal
- Number: 38

Youth career
- Arsenal

Senior career*
Years	Team	Apps	(Gls)
2024–	Arsenal	0	(0)
2024	→ Bristol City (loan)	5	(0)
2025	→ Sheffield United (loan)	5	(0)
2025	→ Ipswich Town (loan)	5	(0)
2026	→ Glasgow City (loan)	5	(0)

International career^{‡}
2021–2023	England U17	9	(5)
2024–2025	England U19	20	(4)
- * Club domestic league appearances and goals as of 5 February 2026 ‡ National team caps and goals as of 21 June 2025

Madison Ava Earl (born 3 November 2006) is an English professional footballer who plays as a midfielder for Women's Super League club Arsenal. Earl has previously played on loan in the WSL 2 and Scottish Women's Premier League (SWPL) and has represented England at youth level.

== Early life ==
Earl grew up in Colchester, beginning her football career at the age of 5, playing for Eight Ash Green.

Earl joined the Arsenal Academy at the age of 8 in 2015, joining the Under-11s team, and rapidly rising through the ranks up to the Under-21 side.

== Club career ==
=== Arsenal ===
On 24 May 2024, Earl made her senior, non-competitive, debut for Arsenal in their 1–0 win against A-League All-Stars as part of Arsenal's 2024 post-season tour. She then went on to feature in Arsenal's 1 – 2 win against Washington Spirit, coming on as a sub for captain Kim Little in the 78th minute.

The attacking midfielder was instrumental in Arsenal Women's Under-21's Blue Stars FIFA Youth Cup tournament win in May 2024, picking up the Golden Ball award as the team picked up their silverware.

On 9 January 2025, Earl signed her first professional contract at Arsenal aged 18, upon her return from loan club Bristol City.

=== Bristol City (dual-sign agreement) ===
On 6 September 2024, Earl signed on a short dual-sign agreement with Women's Super League 2 side Bristol City from September to January 2025.

Earl went on to make just 7 appearances across all competitions for Bristol.

=== Sheffield United (loan) ===
After signing professionally with parent club Arsenal, Earl signed on full loan with Sheffield United for the rest of the 2024–25 football season. After signing on 20 January 2025, Earl went on to make 5 appearances for the Blades across all competitions.

=== Ipswich Town (loan) ===
On 4 September 2025, Earl joined Women's Super League 2 club Ipswich Town for the 2025–26 season. She made her debut off the bench for the Tractor Girls in the 74th minute of a 4–0 loss on opening day, away at Southampton.

Earl scored her first goal for Ipswich Town in their FA Cup Third Round win against AFC Portchester, scoring Ipswich's 5th goal as well as picking up two assists, and was named She's A Baller’s Baller of the Round for her efforts.

Earl was recalled from her loan at the end of the 2026 winter transfer window, having made 8 appearances in all competitions for the Tractor Girls, scoring her only goal for the club in their FA Cup win against AFC Portchester.

=== Glasgow City (loan) ===
On 5 January 2026, Earl joined SWPL 1 side Glasgow City on loan for the remainder of the 2025–26 season. Earl made her debut for Glasgow City in a 4–0 win against Partick Thistle on 15 March 2026. She was in the matchday squad for Glasgow City's SWPL Cup win over Rangers, picking up her first piece of senior silverware.

== International career ==
Earl has represented the England under-17 and under-19 national teams.

In May 2022, she played in the 2022 UEFA U-17 Championship qualification, scoring her first international goal in the 16th minute of England's 8–0 win against Croatia. England did not qualify for the finals tournament that year however, with France topping their group, and England in second place.

In November 2023, Earl received her first England U-19 call-up for the Young Lionesses' Algarve Cup match against Portugal and made her debut in a 2–2 draw.

In July 2024, Earl featured in the 2024 UEFA U-19 Championship, where England lost 3–1 to Spain in the semi-final.

== Playing style ==
Earl is an attacking midfielder who is described as technically skilled and comfortable in possession. She is able to use both feet and is noted for her ability to operate in advanced midfield areas, contributing to both goals and assists.

== Career statistics ==
As of match played 21 December 2025

Appearances and goals by club, season and competition
Club	Season	League			National cup (Note: Includes FA Women's Cup)		League cup (Note: Includes WSL Players Cup)		Total	
Club	Season	Division	Apps	Goals	Apps	Goals	Apps	Goals	Apps	Goals
Bristol City (loan)	2024–25	Championship	5	0	0	0	2	0	7	0
Sheffield United (loan)	2024–25	Championship	5	0	0	0	0	0	5	0
Ipswich Town (loan)	2025–26	Women's Super League 2	5	0	1	1	2	0	8	1
Glasgow City (loan)	2025–26	SWPL 1	5	0	0	0	0	0	5	0
Career total			20	0	1	1	4	0	25	1

== Honours ==
Arsenal

- Blue Stars/FIFA Youth Cup: 2024

Glasgow City

- SWPL Cup: 2025–26
