= FIFA Women's Champions Cup =

Women's association football tournament for clubs

- Organiser(s): FIFA
- Founded: 2025; 1 year ago
- Region: International
- Teams: 6
- Related competitions: FIFA Women's Club World Cup
- Current champions: (England) Arsenal (1st title)
- Most championships: (England) Arsenal (1 title)
- Broadcaster(s): International; FIFA+ DAZN (semi-final, final, and third-place matches)
- 2027 FIFA Women's Champions Cup

The FIFA Women's Champions Cup is an international women's football competition organized by FIFA. First held in 2026, the tournament features the champion clubs from each of the six continental confederations, competing annually—except in years when the quadrennial FIFA Women's Club World Cup is held—to determine the world's premier women's club team.

== History ==
In March 2025, FIFA announced the introduction of the Women's Champions Cup as part of its commitment to enhance women's club football globally. The inaugural tournament took place in 2026 (with first and second round matches held in late 2025), marking a significant milestone in providing a global platform for women's club teams to compete at the highest level.

The introduction of the Women's Champions Cup and the Women's Club World Cup required club championships for each of the six FIFA confederations. While other confederations had existing competitions, the AFC Women's Champions League and CONCACAF W Champions Cup were created to serve as qualification routes.

== Format ==
The competition involves six teams, each representing one of FIFA's continental confederations. The semi-finals, final and third-place match are played at a neutral venue. The matches are structured as follows:

- Round 1: 5th seed hosts the 6th seed.
- Round 2: 4th seed hosts the winners from Round 1.
- Semi-finals: The Round 2 winners play the 1st seed while the 2nd and 3rd seeds play each other.
- Final and third-place match: The semi-final winners contest the final and the losers play in the third-place match.

The teams participating are the winners of the following club championships:

- AFC Women's Champions League
- CAF Women's Champions League
- CONCACAF W Champions Cup
- Copa Libertadores Femenina
- OFC Women's Champions League
- UEFA Women's Champions League

Seeding is based on results from the previous edition, except for the host confederation's team, who get top seed. The seeding for the 2029 edition (which will follow the inaugural Club World Cup) will be subject to further consultation.

== Results ==
=== Finals ===
Year	Winners	Score	Runners-up	Venue	Location	Attendance							
Year	Winners	Score	Runners-up	Venue	Location	Attendance	2026	Arsenal (England)	3–2 (a.e.t.)	(Brazil) Corinthians	Emirates Stadium	London, England	25,031
2027					Miami, United States								

== Trophy ==
The trophy for the FIFA Women's Champions Cup was revealed on 19 January 2026 in London, prior to the inaugural competition's semi-finals. The trophy has a design similar to the men's Club World Cup trophy used since 2025 (which in itself is modeled after the Voyager Golden Records). The front of the trophy features map engravings of all six continental confederations arranged in a hexagonal shape, with a world map in the center reflecting "both the global reach of women’s club football and the international significance of the tournament".

The winners of the competition are also entitled to receive the FIFA Champions Badge, which features an image of the trophy. The reigning champions are entitled to display it on their first-team kit only, up until and including, the final of the next championship.

== See also ==
- FIFA Intercontinental Cup
