= 2026 FIFA Women's Champions Cup =

1st edition of the FIFA Women's Champions Cup

Tournament details
- Host country: Stage 2: England
- Dates: 8 October 2025 – 1 February 2026
- Teams: 6 (from 6 confederations)
- Venues: 4 (in 3 host cities)

Final positions
- Champions: (England) Arsenal (1st title)
- Runners-up: (Brazil) Corinthians
- Third place: (United States) Gotham FC
- Fourth place: (Morocco) AS FAR

Tournament statistics
- Matches played: 6
- Goals scored: 20 (3.33 per match)
- Attendance: 81,491 (13,582 per match)
- Top scorer(s): Alessia Russo (Arsenal); Olivia Smith (Arsenal); Gabi Zanotti (Corinthians); 2 goals each
- Best player: Frida Maanum (Arsenal)
- Best goalkeeper: Anneke Borbe (Arsenal)

The 2026 FIFA Women's Champions Cup was the first edition of the FIFA Women's Champions Cup organised by FIFA. The tournament featured the champion clubs from each of the six continental confederations, playing each other in a single-elimination bracket, to determine the world's premier women's club. The winners received US$2.3 million, the biggest-ever single award in women's club football.

Stage 1 matches were played in the home stadium of a team involved in each match, and stage 2 was played in London, England.

== Format ==
The competition involved six teams, each representing one of FIFA's continental confederations, playing in a single-leg, single-elimination format. The format was similar to the format of the men's FIFA Club World Cup until 2023:

- Stage 1
  - Round 1: The champions of the AFC Women's Champions League hosted the champions of the OFC Women's Champions League.
  - Round 2: The champions of the CAF Women's Champions League hosted the winner from Round 1.
- Stage 2 (centralised location)
  - Semi-finals: The Round 2 winners advanced to play the champions of the UEFA Women's Champions League, while the champions of the CONCACAF W Champions Cup faced the champions of the Copa Libertadores Femenina.
  - Final and third place play-off: The semi-final winners contested the final, and the losers played in the third place play-off.

=== Prize money ===
The winners received US$2.3 million, described by FIFA as the biggest-ever single award in women's club football. The runners-up received $1 million, the losing semi-finalists each received $200,000, the losers in Round 2 received $150,000 and the losers in Round 1 received $100,000.

== Qualified teams ==
Location of the teams participating in the 2026 FIFA Women's Champions Cup.

Team	Confederation	Qualification	Qualified date
Entering in the semi-finals
(United States) Gotham FC	CONCACAF	Winners of the 2024–25 CONCACAF W Champions Cup	24 May 2025
(Brazil) Corinthians	CONMEBOL	Winners of the 2025 Copa Libertadores Femenina	18 October 2025
(England) Arsenal	UEFA	Winners of the 2024–25 UEFA Women's Champions League	24 May 2025
Entering in the second round
(Morocco) AS FAR	CAF	Winners of the 2025 CAF Women's Champions League	21 November 2025
Entering in the first round
(China) Wuhan Jiangda	AFC	Winners of the 2024–25 AFC Women's Champions League	24 May 2025
(New Zealand) Auckland United	OFC	Winners of the 2025 OFC Women's Champions League	17 May 2025

== Venues ==
On 2 October 2025, London was appointed by the FIFA Council as the host of stage 2. Gotham FC had also offered to host in New York. London's selection was reportedly due to Arsenal's busy league schedule around the time of the matches.

China	Morocco	England	
Wuhan	Berrechid	London	
Wuhan Five Rings Sports Center	Berrechid Municipal Stadium	Brentford Community Stadium	Emirates Stadium
Capacity: 30,000	Capacity: 5,000	Capacity: 17,250	Capacity: 60,704
2026 FIFA Women's Champions Cup is located in China	2026 FIFA Women's Champions Cup is located in Morocco	2026 FIFA Women's Champions Cup is located in Greater London	

== Matches ==
Round 1
8 October – Wuhan
(China) Wuhan Jiangda	1
(New Zealand) Auckland United	0

Round 2
14 December – Berrechid
(Morocco) AS FAR (a.e.t.)	2
(China) Wuhan Jiangda	1

Semi-finals
28 January – London
(England) Arsenal	6
(Morocco) AS FAR	0
28 January – London
(United States) Gotham FC	0
(Brazil) Corinthians	1

Final
1 February – London
(England) Arsenal (a.e.t.)	3
(Brazil) Corinthians	2
Match for third place
1 February – London
(Morocco) AS FAR	0
(United States) Gotham FC	4

=== Round 1 ===
8 October 2025
16:00 UTC+8

Wuhan Jiangda (China)	1–0	(New Zealand) Auckland United
Jiang Chenjing 88'	Report

Wuhan Five Rings Sports Center, Wuhan
Attendance: 32,318
Referee: Bouchra Karboubi (Morocco)

=== Round 2 ===
14 December 2025
19:00 UTC+1

AS FAR (Morocco)	2–1 (a.e.t.)	(China) Wuhan Jiangda
Saïd 89'; Mssoudy 104'	Report	Wang Shuang 29'

Berrechid Municipal Stadium, Berrechid
Attendance: 2,689
Referee: Ivana Martinčić (Croatia)

=== Semi-finals ===
28 January 2026
12:30 UTC+0

Gotham FC (United States)	0–1	(Brazil) Corinthians
	Report	Gabi Zanotti 83'

Brentford Community Stadium, London
Attendance: 6,177
Referee: Tess Olofsson (Sweden)

28 January 2026
18:00 UTC+0

Arsenal (England)	6–0	(Morocco) AS FAR
Blackstenius 8'; Maanum 12'; Caldentey 21' (pen.); Smith 41'; Russo 66', 76'	Report

Brentford Community Stadium, London
Attendance: 8,066
Referee: Yoshimi Yamashita (Japan)

=== Match for third place ===
1 February 2026
14:45 UTC+0

AS FAR (Morocco)	0–4	(United States) Gotham FC
	Report	Harper 27'; McCaskill 38'; Shaw 43' (pen.); Purce 48'

Emirates Stadium, London
Attendance: 7,210
Referee: Edina Alves Batista (Brazil)

=== Final ===
1 February 2026
18:00 UTC+0

Arsenal (England)	3–2 (a.e.t.)	(Brazil) Corinthians
Smith 15'; Wubben-Moy 58'; Foord 104'	Report	Gabi Zanotti 21'; Victória 90+6' (pen.)

Emirates Stadium, London
Attendance: 25,031
Referee: Katia Itzel García (Mexico)

== Goalscorers ==
Rank	Player	Team	Goals
1	(England) Alessia Russo	(England) Arsenal	2
1	(Canada) Olivia Smith	(England) Arsenal	2
1	(Brazil) Gabi Zanotti	(Brazil) Corinthians	2
4	(Sweden) Stina Blackstenius	(England) Arsenal	1
4	(Spain) Mariona Caldentey	(England) Arsenal	1
4	(Australia) Caitlin Foord	(England) Arsenal	1
4	(United States) Khyah Harper	(United States) Gotham FC	1
4	(China) Jiang Chenjing	(China) Wuhan Jiangda	1
4	(Norway) Frida Maanum	(England) Arsenal	1
4	(United States) Savannah McCaskill	(United States) Gotham FC	1
4	(Morocco) Sanaâ Mssoudy	(Morocco) AS FAR	1
4	(United States) Midge Purce	(United States) Gotham FC	1
4	(Morocco) Hajar Saïd	(Morocco) AS FAR	1
4	(United States) Jaedyn Shaw	(United States) Gotham FC	1
4	(Brazil) Victória	(Brazil) Corinthians	1
4	(China) Wang Shuang	(China) Wuhan Jiangda	1
4	(England) Lotte Wubben-Moy	(England) Arsenal	1

== Broadcasters ==
FIFA+ provided free streaming coverage worldwide of stage 1. DAZN and FIFA+ provided free streaming coverage worldwide for stage 2, apart from in the following territories (mainly the home markets of the semi-finalists):

Territory	Broadcaster
Brazil	CazéTV
China	CCTV
Ireland	Sky Sports
United Kingdom	Sky Sports
Morocco	SNRT
United States	CBS Sports Golazo Network (third place match and final only)

== Reception ==
Since its creation was approved and its dates confirmed in March 2025, the brand new tournament faced many challenges in organisation and in gaining public and commercial interest. A lack of media interest led to broadcasters for stage 2 only confirmed two weeks before it began. While London was announced as host in October 2025, the announcement of the venues came only on 12 December. FIFA also struggled with arranging commercial partnerships, only securing sponsorships days before the semi-finals. Among them is presenting partner Kynisca, which is a multi-club ownership organisation. The partnership raised concerns over conflict of interest given the possibility of one of its clubs participating in future editions. 25,031 people attended the final, around 11,000 fewer than Arsenal's average attendance for the season up to that day. In Brazil, over one million people watched CazéTV's broadcast of the final. The semi-finals had poor attendance, partly owing to their unusual kick-off times.

Concerns were raised over the fairness of the competition. Despite the initial announcement of the competition having stage 2 to be played at a neutral venue, the final was held in Arsenal's home ground. Arsenal were in the middle of their domestic season and could train at their own facilities. Some other teams were in their preseason and had to manage disruptions to transfer window activity and logistical issues over player availability. To prepare for the competition, Gotham FC, in their preseason, held a three-week training camp in Spain out of pocket. This meant rearranging their usual NWSL season preparations to protect player welfare. Ultimately, Gotham FC lost their semi-final and their prize money could not offset their preparation expenses. For Arsenal, the timing of the competition was inconvenient in a congested calendar and raised concerns over player workload. AS FAR and Corinthians had visa issues resulting in some players arriving in London later than the rest of the teams. Ahead of the final, Arsenal academy players were spotted watching Corinthians train at the Hive. The incident was reported by Corinthians to FIFA.

== Final standings ==
The final standings were used for seeding in the following edition.

Rank	Team	Confederation
1st place, gold medalist(s)	(England) Arsenal	UEFA
2nd place, silver medalist(s)	(Brazil) Corinthians	CONMEBOL
3rd place, bronze medalist(s)	(United States) Gotham FC	CONCACAF
4	(Morocco) AS FAR	CAF
5	(China) Wuhan Jiangda	AFC
6	(New Zealand) Auckland United	OFC

== See also ==
- 2025 FIFA Intercontinental Cup
