= 2024–25 UEFA Youth League league phase =

Football tournament group stage

The 2024–25 UEFA Youth League UEFA Champions League Path (league phase) began on 17 September and ended on 11 December 2024. A total of 36 teams competed in the group stage of the UEFA Champions League Path to decide 22 of the 36 places in the knockout phase of the 2024–25 UEFA Youth League.

== Format ==
Each team played six matches, three at home and three away, against six different opponents, with all 36 teams ranked in a single league table. The top 22 ranked teams qualified for the round of 32 of the knockout stage, where they were joined by ten winners of the Domestic Champions Path. Teams ranked from 23rd to 36th were eliminated from the competition.

=== Tiebreakers ===
Teams were ranked according to points (3 points for a win, 1 point for a draw, 0 points for a loss). If two or more teams were equal on points upon completion of the league phase, the following tiebreaking criteria were applied, in the order given, to determine their rankings:

1. Goal difference;
2. Goals scored;
3. Away goals scored;
4. Wins;
5. Away wins;
6. Higher number of points obtained collectively by league phase opponents;
7. Superior collective goal difference of league phase opponents;
8. Higher number of goals scored collectively by league phase opponents;
9. Lower disciplinary points total (direct red card = 3 points, yellow card = 1 point, expulsion for two yellow cards in one match = 3 points);
10. Drawing of lots.

During the league phase, criteria 1 to 5 were used to rank teams who have equal number of points. Should any teams be equal on points and tied on the first five criteria, they were considered equal in position and sorted alphabetically. Criteria 6 to 10 would only be used to break ties upon completion of all matches.

== Table ==
Pos	Team	Pld	W	D	L	GF	GA	GD	Pts	Qualification
1	(Italian Football Federation) Inter Milan	6	6	0	0	19	7	+12	18	Advance to knockout phase
2	(Portuguese Football Federation) Sporting CP	6	5	1	0	13	3	+10	16	Advance to knockout phase
3	(Austrian Football Association) Red Bull Salzburg	6	5	1	0	17	9	+8	16	Advance to knockout phase
4	(Royal Spanish Football Federation) Barcelona	6	5	0	1	17	10	+7	15	Advance to knockout phase
5	(German Football Association) VfB Stuttgart	6	4	1	1	13	6	+7	13	Advance to knockout phase
6	(Royal Spanish Football Federation) Real Madrid	6	4	0	2	10	5	+5	12	Advance to knockout phase
7	(Italian Football Federation) Atalanta	6	4	0	2	14	12	+2	12	Advance to knockout phase
8	(Royal Spanish Football Federation) Atlético Madrid	6	3	2	1	16	8	+8	11	Advance to knockout phase
9	(Portuguese Football Federation) Benfica	6	3	2	1	12	7	+5	11	Advance to knockout phase
10	(Italian Football Federation) Juventus	6	3	2	1	9	4	+5	11	Advance to knockout phase
11	(The Football Association) Manchester City	6	3	1	2	16	8	+8	10	Advance to knockout phase
12	(Royal Spanish Football Federation) Girona	6	2	4	0	9	5	+4	10	Advance to knockout phase
13	(German Football Association) Bayern Munich	6	3	1	2	11	12	−1	10	Advance to knockout phase
14	(Ukrainian Association of Football) Shakhtar Donetsk	6	3	1	2	9	11	−2	10	Advance to knockout phase
15	(The Football Association) Aston Villa	6	3	0	3	14	11	+3	9	Advance to knockout phase
16	(Austrian Football Association) Sturm Graz	6	2	3	1	10	8	+2	9	Advance to knockout phase
17	(Scottish Football Association) Celtic	6	3	0	3	10	10	0	9	Advance to knockout phase
18	(German Football Association) Borussia Dortmund	6	2	2	2	11	8	+3	8	Advance to knockout phase
19	(The Football Association) Liverpool	6	2	2	2	9	8	+1	8	Advance to knockout phase
20	(French Football Federation) Lille	6	1	5	0	8	7	+1	8	Advance to knockout phase
21	(Croatian Football Federation) Dinamo Zagreb	6	2	2	2	8	8	0	8	Advance to knockout phase
22	(French Football Federation) Monaco	6	2	2	2	6	7	−1	8	Advance to knockout phase
23	(French Football Federation) Paris Saint-Germain	6	2	1	3	14	13	+1	7	
24	(German Football Association) Bayer Leverkusen	6	2	1	3	7	9	−2	7	
25	(Royal Dutch Football Association) PSV Eindhoven	6	1	3	2	8	9	−1	6	
26	(The Football Association) Arsenal	6	2	0	4	5	12	−7	6	
27	(Italian Football Federation) Milan	6	1	2	3	7	11	−4	5 (Note: Away goals scored: Milan 5; Red Star Belgrade 4.)	
28	(Football Association of Serbia) Red Star Belgrade	6	1	2	3	7	11	−4	5	
29	(Royal Dutch Football Association) Feyenoord	6	1	1	4	7	14	−7	4	
30	(Swiss Football Association) Young Boys	6	1	0	5	11	17	−6	3	
31	(Royal Belgian Football Association) Club Brugge	6	0	3	3	5	11	−6	3	
32	(German Football Association) RB Leipzig	6	1	0	5	10	18	−8	3	
33	(Italian Football Federation) Bologna	6	0	2	4	7	14	−7	2	
34	(French Football Federation) Brest	6	0	2	4	5	16	−11	2	
35	(Slovak Football Association) Slovan Bratislava	6	0	2	4	6	20	−14	2	
36	(Football Association of the Czech Republic) Sparta Prague	6	0	1	5	4	15	−11	1	

Source: UEFA
Rules for classification: League phase tiebreakers

== Results summary ==
Matchday 1
Home team	Score	Away team
Young Boys (Switzerland)	2–1	(England) Aston Villa
Juventus (Italy)	1–0	(Netherlands) PSV Eindhoven
Milan (Italy)	0–0	(England) Liverpool
Bayern Munich (Germany)	2–1	(Croatia) Dinamo Zagreb
Real Madrid (Spain)	1–0	(Germany) VfB Stuttgart
Sporting CP (Portugal)	2–2	(France) Lille
Sparta Prague (Czech Republic)	2–3	(Austria) Red Bull Salzburg
Bologna (Italy)	3–4	(Ukraine) Shakhtar Donetsk
Celtic (Scotland)	4–0	(Slovakia) Slovan Bratislava
Club Brugge (Belgium)	1–1	(Germany) Borussia Dortmund
Manchester City (England)	2–4	(Italy) Inter Milan
Paris Saint-Germain (France)	0–2	(Spain) Girona
Feyenoord (Netherlands)	1–2	(Germany) Bayer Leverkusen
Red Star Belgrade (Serbia)	1–2	(Portugal) Benfica
Monaco (France)	4–3	(Spain) Barcelona
Atalanta (Italy)	4–1	(England) Arsenal
Atlético Madrid (Spain)	4–0	(Germany) RB Leipzig
Brest (France)	1–4	(Austria) Sturm Graz

Matchday 2
Home team	Score	Away team
Red Bull Salzburg (Austria)	5–1	(France) Brest
VfB Stuttgart (Germany)	3–0	(Czech Republic) Sparta Prague
Arsenal (England)	1–0	(France) Paris Saint-Germain
Bayer Leverkusen (Germany)	3–1	(Italy) Milan
Borussia Dortmund (Germany)	4–0	(Scotland) Celtic
Barcelona (Spain)	4–2	(Switzerland) Young Boys
Inter Milan (Italy)	4–0	(Serbia) Red Star Belgrade
PSV Eindhoven (Netherlands)	0–2	(Portugal) Sporting CP
Slovan Bratislava (Slovakia)	0–4	(England) Manchester City
Shakhtar Donetsk (Ukraine)	0–3	(Italy) Atalanta
Girona (Spain)	2–0	(Netherlands) Feyenoord
Aston Villa (England)	0–1	(Germany) Bayern Munich
Dinamo Zagreb (Croatia)	1–0	(France) Monaco
Liverpool (England)	2–1	(Italy) Bologna
Lille (France)	2–1	(Spain) Real Madrid
RB Leipzig (Germany)	0–3	(Italy) Juventus
Sturm Graz (Austria)	1–1	(Belgium) Club Brugge
Benfica (Portugal)	2–2	(Spain) Atlético Madrid

Matchday 3
Home team	Score	Away team
Milan (Italy)	1–1	(Belgium) Club Brugge
Monaco (France)	1–1	(Serbia) Red Star Belgrade
Arsenal (England)	0–1	(Ukraine) Shakhtar Donetsk
Aston Villa (England)	3–1	(Italy) Bologna
Girona (Spain)	2–2	(Slovakia) Slovan Bratislava
Juventus (Italy)	2–3	(Germany) VfB Stuttgart
Paris Saint-Germain (France)	3–3	(Netherlands) PSV Eindhoven
Real Madrid (Spain)	1–2	(Germany) Borussia Dortmund
Sturm Graz (Austria)	1–3	(Portugal) Sporting CP
Atalanta (Italy)	2–1	(Scotland) Celtic
Brest (France)	1–1	(Germany) Bayer Leverkusen
Atlético Madrid (Spain)	1–1	(France) Lille
Young Boys (Switzerland)	2–3	(Italy) Inter Milan
Barcelona (Spain)	3–1	(Germany) Bayern Munich
Red Bull Salzburg (Austria)	3–2	(Croatia) Dinamo Zagreb
Manchester City (England)	3–0	(Czech Republic) Sparta Prague
RB Leipzig (Germany)	3–1	(England) Liverpool
Benfica (Portugal)	2–0	(Netherlands) Feyenoord

Matchday 4
Home team	Score	Away team
PSV Eindhoven (Netherlands)	1–1	(Spain) Girona
Slovan Bratislava (Slovakia)	2–2	(Croatia) Dinamo Zagreb
Bologna (Italy)	0–0	(France) Monaco
Borussia Dortmund (Germany)	2–3	(Austria) Sturm Graz
Celtic (Scotland)	3–2	(Germany) RB Leipzig
Liverpool (England)	4–1	(Germany) Bayer Leverkusen
Lille (France)	0–0	(Italy) Juventus
Real Madrid (Spain)	2–1	(Italy) Milan
Sporting CP (Portugal)	2–0	(England) Manchester City
Club Brugge (Belgium)	2–6	(England) Aston Villa
Shakhtar Donetsk (Ukraine)	3–2	(Switzerland) Young Boys
Sparta Prague (Czech Republic)	1–1	(France) Brest
Bayern Munich (Germany)	3–3	(Portugal) Benfica
Inter Milan (Italy)	4–1	(England) Arsenal
Feyenoord (Netherlands)	2–2	(Austria) Red Bull Salzburg
Red Star Belgrade (Serbia)	1–2	(Spain) Barcelona
Paris Saint-Germain (France)	4–2	(Spain) Atlético Madrid
VfB Stuttgart (Germany)	4–1	(Italy) Atalanta

Matchday 5
Home team	Score	Away team
Sparta Prague (Czech Republic)	1–2	(Spain) Atlético Madrid
Slovan Bratislava (Slovakia)	2–3	(Italy) Milan
Bayer Leverkusen (Germany)	0–1	(Austria) Red Bull Salzburg
Young Boys (Switzerland)	2–4	(Italy) Atalanta
Barcelona (Spain)	2–0	(France) Brest
Bayern Munich (Germany)	2–5	(France) Paris Saint-Germain
Inter Milan (Italy)	3–2	(Germany) RB Leipzig
Manchester City (England)	6–1	(Netherlands) Feyenoord
Sporting CP (Portugal)	3–0	(England) Arsenal
Red Star Belgrade (Serbia)	1–1	(Germany) VfB Stuttgart
Sturm Graz (Austria)	0–0	(Spain) Girona
Monaco (France)	1–0	(Portugal) Benfica
Aston Villa (England)	0–2	(Italy) Juventus
Bologna (Italy)	2–2	(France) Lille
Celtic (Scotland)	1–0	(Belgium) Club Brugge
Dinamo Zagreb (Croatia)	0–0	(Germany) Borussia Dortmund
Liverpool (England)	0–1	(Spain) Real Madrid
PSV Eindhoven (Netherlands)	1–1	(Ukraine) Shakhtar Donetsk

Matchday 6
Home team	Score	Away team
Girona (Spain)	2–2	(England) Liverpool
Dinamo Zagreb (Croatia)	2–1	(Scotland) Celtic
Atalanta (Italy)	0–4	(Spain) Real Madrid
Bayer Leverkusen (Germany)	0–1	(Italy) Inter Milan
Club Brugge (Belgium)	0–1	(Portugal) Sporting CP
Red Bull Salzburg (Austria)	3–2	(France) Paris Saint-Germain
Shakhtar Donetsk (Ukraine)	0–2	(Germany) Bayern Munich
RB Leipzig (Germany)	3–4	(England) Aston Villa
Brest (France)	1–3	(Netherlands) PSV Eindhoven
Atlético Madrid (Spain)	5–0	(Slovakia) Slovan Bratislava
Lille (France)	1–1	(Austria) Sturm Graz
Milan (Italy)	1–3	(Serbia) Red Star Belgrade
Arsenal (England)	2–0	(France) Monaco
Borussia Dortmund (Germany)	2–3	(Spain) Barcelona
Feyenoord (Netherlands)	3–0	(Czech Republic) Sparta Prague
Juventus (Italy)	1–1	(England) Manchester City
Benfica (Portugal)	3–0	(Italy) Bologna
VfB Stuttgart (Germany)	2–1	(Switzerland) Young Boys

== Matches ==
The schedule was identical to the first six matchdays of the UEFA Champions League league phase, the fixture list for which was announced on 31 August 2024.

In principle, the matches were played on the same day as the corresponding matches in the Champions League, unless the clubs and UEFA agree otherwise. The matches were played on 17–19 September, 1–2 October, 22–23 October, 5–6 November, 26–27 November and 10–11 December 2024.

Times are CET or CEST, (Note: CEST (UTC+2) for dates up to 26 October 2024 (matchdays 1–3), and CET (UTC+1) for dates thereafter (matchdays 4–6).) (local times, if different, are in parentheses).

=== Matchday 1 ===
17 September 2024
14:00

Juventus (Italian Football Federation)	1–0	(Royal Dutch Football Association) PSV Eindhoven
Benia 56'	Report

Juventus Training Center, Turin
Attendance: 350
Referee: Gustavo Correia (Portugal)

17 September 2024
14:00 (13:00 UTC+1)

Sporting CP (Portuguese Football Federation)	2–2	(French Football Federation) Lille
Mendonça 23'; Felicíssimo 90+7'	Report	Cossier 11'; Ayodele 62'

Stadium Aurélio Pereira, Alcochete
Attendance: 419
Referee: Danilo Nikolić (Serbia)

17 September 2024
14:00

Young Boys (Swiss Football Association)	2–1	(The Football Association) Aston Villa
Tsimba 37'; Rufener 68'	Report	Wilson 21'

Sportpark Wyler, Bern
Attendance: 312
Referee: Mohammad Usman Aslam (Norway)

17 September 2024
14:30

Milan (Italian Football Federation)	0–0	(The Football Association) Liverpool
	Report

Centro Sportivo Vismara, Milan
Attendance: 346
Referee: Granit Maqedonci (Sweden)

17 September 2024
16:00

Real Madrid (Royal Spanish Football Federation)	1–0	(German Football Association) VfB Stuttgart
Yañez 32'	Report

Ciudad Real Madrid Campo 11, Madrid
Attendance: 421
Referee: Henrik Nalbandyan (Armenia)

17 September 2024
16:00

Bayern Munich (German Football Association)	2–1	(Croatian Football Federation) Dinamo Zagreb
Aznou 55'; Nasrawe 59'	Report	Rimac 90+2'

FC Bayern Campus, Munich
Attendance: 500
Referee: Dmytro Panchyshyn (Ukraine)

18 September 2024 (Note: The Bologna v Shakhtar Donetsk match, that was originally played at Crespellano Training Center, was suspended after seven minutes due to adverse weather conditions with the score 0–0 at the time. It was resumed on 19 September 2024, 16:00, at Stadio Renato Dall'Ara.)
12:00

Bologna (Italian Football Federation)	3–4	(Ukrainian Association of Football) Shakhtar Donetsk
Ebone 27' (pen.); De Luca 50'; Menegazzo 67'	Report	Tsukanov 9', 72'; Lomaha 37'; Tryfanenko 90'

Crespellano Training Center, Valsamoggia
Stadio Renato Dall'Ara, Bologna
Attendance: 400
Referee: Peiman Simani (Finland)

18 September 2024
13:00

Sparta Prague (Football Association of the Czech Republic)	2–3	(Austrian Football Association) Red Bull Salzburg
Hranoš 52'; Mokrovics 67'	Report	Adejenughure 8'; Striednig 55'; Jánó 64'

Stadion Lokomotiva Praha, Prague
Attendance: 389
Referee: Martin Matoša (Slovenia)

18 September 2024
15:00

Paris Saint-Germain (French Football Federation)	0–2	(Royal Spanish Football Federation) Girona
	Report	Arango 11'; E. García 76'

PSG Campus, Poissy
Attendance: 697
Referee: Helgi Mikael Jónasson (Iceland)

18 September 2024
15:00 (14:00 UTC+1)

Celtic (Scottish Football Association)	4–0	(Slovak Football Association) Slovan Bratislava
Cummings 9', 23'; Turley 47'; Isiguzo 84'	Report

Lesser Hampden, Glasgow
Attendance: 311
Referee: Jacob Karlsen (Denmark)

18 September 2024
15:30

Club Brugge (Royal Belgian Football Association)	1–1	(German Football Association) Borussia Dortmund
Granados 43'	Report	Wätjen 90'

The NEST, Roeselare
Attendance: 950
Referee: Heini Ziskason Viðoy (Faroe Islands)

18 September 2024
16:00 (15:00 UTC+1)

Manchester City (The Football Association)	2–4	(Italian Football Federation) Inter Milan
Alfa-Ruprecht 2', 48'	Report	Berenbruch 8', 81'; Lavelli 15' (pen.); Alexiou 17'

Academy Stadium, Manchester
Attendance: 333
Referee: Ishmael Barbara (Malta)

19 September 2024
13:00

Red Star Belgrade (Football Association of Serbia)	1–2	(Portuguese Football Federation) Benfica
Maksimović 57'	Report	Varela 13', 51'

Red Star Youth School Field, Belgrade
Attendance: 500
Referee: Damian Kos (Poland)

19 September 2024
14:00

Feyenoord (Royal Dutch Football Association)	1–2	(German Football Association) Bayer Leverkusen
Ouarghi 79'	Report	Hawighorst 22'; Onyeka 63'

Sportcomplex Varkenoord, Rotterdam
Attendance: 1,200
Referee: Jamie Robinson (Northern Ireland)

19 September 2024
14:00

Brest (French Football Federation)	1–4	(Austrian Football Association) Sturm Graz
Kanté 60'	Report	Grgic 17', 90+4'; Kern 40'; Koita 80'

Stade Francis-Le Blé, Brest
Attendance: 890
Referee: Christos Vergetis (Greece)

19 September 2024
14:30

Atalanta (Italian Football Federation)	4–1	(The Football Association) Arsenal
Comi 16'; Fiogbé 32'; Steffanoni 41'; Artesani 89'	Report	Dowman 49'

Stadio Comunale, Caravaggio
Attendance: 639
Referee: Joonas Jaanovits (Estonia)

19 September 2024
15:00

Monaco (French Football Federation)	4–3	(Royal Spanish Football Federation) Barcelona
Tincres 41', 65'; Bouabré 44'; Carvalho 81'	Report	Pradas 17'; Alba 36' (pen.); Fernández 61'

Stade de formation AS Monaco 1, La Turbie
Attendance: 286
Referee: Bence Csonka (Hungary)

19 September 2024
16:00

Atlético Madrid (Royal Spanish Football Federation)	4–0	(German Football Association) RB Leipzig
Janneh 11'; Hueso 18'; Belaid 65' (pen.); Esteban 90+1'	Report

Centro Deportivo Wanda Alcalá de Henares, Alcalá de Henares
Attendance: 338
Referee: Ion Orlic (Moldova)

=== Matchday 2 ===
1 October 2024
12:30

VfB Stuttgart (German Football Association)	3–0	(Football Association of the Czech Republic) Sparta Prague
Penna 54', 85'; Hajdini 81'	Report

Gazi-Stadion auf der Waldau, Stuttgart
Attendance: 1,380
Referee: Kamal Umudlu (Azerbaijan)

1 October 2024
14:00

Bayer Leverkusen (German Football Association)	3–1	(Italian Football Federation) Milan
Onyeka 6'; Alajbegović 39'; Stepanov 90+5'	Report	Bonomi 71'

Ulrich-Haberland-Stadion, Leverkusen
Attendance: 454
Referee: Andreas Argyrou (Cyprus)

1 October 2024
14:00

PSV Eindhoven (Royal Dutch Football Association)	0–2	(Portuguese Football Federation) Sporting CP
	Report	Moreira 45+2'; Felicíssimo 51'

De Herdgang, Eindhoven
Attendance: 500
Referee: Kevin O'Sullivan (Republic of Ireland)

1 October 2024
14:00

Red Bull Salzburg (Austrian Football Association)	5–1	(French Football Federation) Brest
Verhounig 21', 25'; Jánó 48' (pen.); Baidoo 64'; Hussauf 76'	Report	Geraux 80' (pen.)

Red Bull Akademie, Salzburg
Attendance: 425
Referee: Marek Radina (Czech Republic)

1 October 2024
14:00

Slovan Bratislava (Slovak Football Association)	0–4	(The Football Association) Manchester City
	Report	Wright 45' (pen.), 73'; Warhurst 55'; Henderson-Hall 90+2'

National Training Centre, Senec
Attendance: 2,500
Referee: Iuliana Demetrescu (Romania)

1 October 2024
14:30

Inter Milan (Italian Football Federation)	4–0	(Football Association of Serbia) Red Star Belgrade
Topalović 23'; Cocchi 34'; De Pieri 40'; Mosconi 61'	Report

Youth Development Training Center, Milan
Attendance: 357
Referee: Kadir Sağlam (Turkey)

1 October 2024
16:00

Borussia Dortmund (German Football Association)	4–0	(Scottish Football Association) Celtic
Kabar 21'; Diallo 55'; Wätjen 65'; Kaba 90'	Report

Dortmund Brackel Training Ground, Dortmund
Attendance: 798
Referee: Miguel Nogueira (Portugal)

1 October 2024
16:00

Barcelona (Royal Spanish Football Federation)	4–2	(Swiss Football Association) Young Boys
Alba 35'; Pradas 40'; Gistau 66'; Fernández 90'	Report	Jost 32'; Mendes 81'

Johan Cruyff Stadium, Sant Joan Despí
Attendance: 745
Referee: Jakob Sundberg (Denmark)

1 October 2024
16:00 (15:00 UTC+1)

Arsenal (The Football Association)	1–0	(French Football Federation) Paris Saint-Germain
Annous 19'	Report

Meadow Park, Borehamwood
Attendance: 300
Referee: David Fuxman (Israel)

2 October 2024
14:00

Shakhtar Donetsk (Ukrainian Association of Football)	0–3	(Italian Football Federation) Atalanta
	Report	Camara 10'; Fiogbé 45', 49'

Parkstadion, Gelsenkirchen, Germany (Note: Due to the Russian invasion of Ukraine, Ukrainian teams were required to play their home matches at neutral venues until further notice.)
Attendance: 527
Referee: Michele Beltrano (San Marino)

2 October 2024
14:00

Dinamo Zagreb (Croatian Football Federation)	1–0	(French Football Federation) Monaco
Horvat 63'	Report

Ivan Laljak-Ivić Stadium, Zaprešić
Attendance: 556
Referee: Ashot Ghaltakhchyan (Armenia)

2 October 2024
14:00 (13:00 UTC+1)

Aston Villa (The Football Association)	0–1	(German Football Association) Bayern Munich
	Report	Kusi-Asare 64'

Bodymoor Heath Training Ground, Tamworth
Attendance: 468
Referee: Patrik Kolarić (Croatia)

2 October 2024
14:00

Girona (Royal Spanish Football Federation)	2–0	(Royal Dutch Football Association) Feyenoord
Arango 60'; Kim 87'	Report

Camp de Futbol Municipal de Vidreres, Vidreres
Attendance: 1,000
Referee: Antoni Bandić (Bosnia and Herzegovina)

2 October 2024
15:00 (14:00 UTC+1)

Liverpool (The Football Association)	2–1	(Italian Football Federation) Bologna
Young 51'; Nallo 73'	Report	Tonin 59'

Liverpool FC Academy Training Ground, Kirkby
Attendance: 181
Referee: Marc Nagtegaal (Netherlands)

2 October 2024
15:00

Lille (French Football Federation)	2–1	(Royal Spanish Football Federation) Real Madrid
Diaoune 40'; Ayodele 43'	Report	Yañez 57'

Domaine de Luchin, Lille
Attendance: 941
Referee: Amine Kourgheli (Belarus)

2 October 2024
16:00

RB Leipzig (German Football Association)	0–3	(Italian Football Federation) Juventus
	Report	Vacca 8'; Florea 46'; Biliboc 87'

Stadion am Cottaweg, Leipzig
Attendance: 645
Referee: Jan Petřík (Czech Republic)

2 October 2024
16:00 (15:00 UTC+1)

Benfica (Portuguese Football Federation)	2–2	(Royal Spanish Football Federation) Atlético Madrid
Varela 1'; Tomé 18'	Report	Belaid 25'; Janneh 45+4' (pen.)

Benfica Campus, Seixal
Attendance: 725
Referee: Mohammad Al-Emara (Finland)

2 October 2024
16:00

Sturm Graz (Austrian Football Association)	1–1	(Royal Belgian Football Association) Club Brugge
Grgic 29'	Report	Furo 77'

Jacques Lemans Arena, St. Veit an der Glan
Attendance: 354
Referee: Antoine Chiaramonti (Andorra)

=== Matchday 3 ===
22 October 2024
13:00

Monaco (French Football Federation)	1–1	(Football Association of Serbia) Red Star Belgrade
Tincres 11'	Report	Sremčević 8'

Stade de formation AS Monaco 1, La Turbie
Attendance: 300
Referee: Ion Orlic (Moldova)

22 October 2024
14:00 (13:00 UTC+1)

Arsenal (The Football Association)	0–1	(Ukrainian Association of Football) Shakhtar Donetsk
	Report	Halonskyi 14'

Meadow Park, Borehamwood
Attendance: 380
Referee: Alan Kijas (Austria)

22 October 2024
14:00

Milan (Italian Football Federation)	1–1	(Royal Belgian Football Association) Club Brugge
Ossola 90+5'	Report	Furo 41'

Centro Sportivo Vismara, Milan
Attendance: 382
Referee: Joonas Jaanovits (Estonia)

22 October 2024
14:00 (13:00 UTC+1)

Aston Villa (The Football Association)	3–1	(Italian Football Federation) Bologna
Cotcher 34'; Broggio 52', 65'	Report	Ebone 41'

Bodymoor Heath Training Ground, Tamworth
Attendance: 246
Referee: Kyriakos Athanasiou (Cyprus)

22 October 2024
14:30

Paris Saint-Germain (French Football Federation)	3–3	(Royal Dutch Football Association) PSV Eindhoven
Khafi 19', 63'; Sangaré 40'	Report	Kluit 6'; Merién 38'; Van Duiven 79'

PSG Campus, Poissy
Attendance: 836
Referee: Adam Ladebäck (Sweden)

22 October 2024
15:00

Juventus (Italian Football Federation)	2–3	(German Football Association) VfB Stuttgart
Vacca 14', 85'	Report	Bujupi 44'; Lüers 74'; Freßle 90+7'

Juventus Training Center, Turin
Attendance: 350
Referee: Amine Kourgheli (Belarus)

22 October 2024
16:00

Real Madrid (Royal Spanish Football Federation)	1–2	(German Football Association) Borussia Dortmund
De Llanos 8'	Report	Cherny 64' (pen.); Etcibasi 90+7'

Alfredo Di Stéfano Stadium, Madrid
Attendance: 733
Referee: Damian Kos (Poland)

22 October 2024
16:00

Girona (Royal Spanish Football Federation)	2–2	(Slovak Football Association) Slovan Bratislava
Escoda 3'; Plaza 65'	Report	Maroš 25'; Murár 36'

Camp de Futbol Municipal de Vidreres, Vidreres
Attendance: 800
Referee: Oliver Reitala (Finland)

22 October 2024
16:00

Sturm Graz (Austrian Football Association)	1–3	(Portuguese Football Federation) Sporting CP
Ilic 34'	Report	Santos 4'; Silva 19', 56'

Jacques Lemans Arena, St. Veit an der Glan
Attendance: 414
Referee: Lothar D'hondt (Belgium)

23 October 2024
11:00

Brest (French Football Federation)	1–1	(German Football Association) Bayer Leverkusen
Kanté 44'	Report	Alajbegović 24'

Stade Francis-Le Blé, Brest
Attendance: 3,110
Referee: Michele Beltrano (San Marino)

23 October 2024
12:00 (11:00 UTC+1)

Benfica (Portuguese Football Federation)	2–0	(Royal Dutch Football Association) Feyenoord
Moreira 45', 49'	Report

Benfica Campus, Seixal
Attendance: 750
Referee: David Šmajc (Slovenia)

23 October 2024
12:30

Atalanta (Italian Football Federation)	2–1	(Scottish Football Association) Celtic
Camara 68'; Bonsignori 90+3'	Report	Turley 52'

Stadio Comunale, Caravaggio
Attendance: 299
Referee: Miloš Bošković (Montenegro)

23 October 2024
14:00

Young Boys (Swiss Football Association)	2–3	(Italian Football Federation) Inter Milan
Jost 43'; Smith 63'	Report	Della Mora 34'; Cocchi 54'; Alexiou 87'

Sportpark Wyler, Bern
Attendance: 830
Referee: Tom Owen (Wales)

23 October 2024
15:30

Red Bull Salzburg (Austrian Football Association)	3–2	(Croatian Football Federation) Dinamo Zagreb
Verhounig 5', 54'; Jánó 87' (pen.)	Report	Šunta 40'; Šepić 90+3'

Red Bull Akademie, Salzburg
Attendance: 425
Referee: Mikkel Redder (Denmark)

23 October 2024
16:00 (15:00 UTC+1)

Manchester City (The Football Association)	3–0	(Football Association of the Czech Republic) Sparta Prague
Oboavwoduo 10', 37', 82'	Report

Academy Stadium, Manchester
Attendance: 842
Referee: Granit Maqedonci (Sweden)

23 October 2024
16:00

RB Leipzig (German Football Association)	3–1	(The Football Association) Liverpool
Schuldes 37'; Weißbach 62'; Heyer 66'	Report	Morrison 67'

Stadion am Cottaweg, Leipzig
Attendance: 863
Referee: Kevin O'Sullivan (Republic of Ireland)

23 October 2024
16:00

Barcelona (Royal Spanish Football Federation)	3–1	(German Football Association) Bayern Munich
Gistau 10', 35'; Virgili 47'	Report	Chávez 58'

Johan Cruyff Stadium, Sant Joan Despí
Attendance: 1,304
Referee: Mohammad Usman Aslam (Norway)

23 October 2024
16:00

Atlético Madrid (Royal Spanish Football Federation)	1–1	(French Football Federation) Lille
Janneh 51' (pen.)	Report	Akale 37'

Centro Deportivo Wanda Alcalá de Henares, Alcalá de Henares
Attendance: 360
Referee: Jamie Robinson (Northern Ireland)

=== Matchday 4 ===
5 November 2024
13:00

Slovan Bratislava (Slovak Football Association)	2–2	(Croatian Football Federation) Dinamo Zagreb
Ivanics 81' (pen.); Józsa 90+1'	Report	Šunta 4'; Horvat 60'

National Training Centre, Senec
Attendance: 1,450
Referee: Jasmin Sabotic (Luxembourg)

5 November 2024
14:00 (13:00 UTC+0)

Sporting CP (Portuguese Football Federation)	2–0	(The Football Association) Manchester City
Santos 49'; Silva 56'	Report

Stadium Aurélio Pereira, Alcochete
Attendance: 448
Referee: Florian Lata (Albania)

5 November 2024
14:00

PSV Eindhoven (Royal Dutch Football Association)	1–1	(Royal Spanish Football Federation) Girona
Bahaty 26'	Report	Van Duiven 59' (o.g.)

De Herdgang, Eindhoven
Attendance: 630
Referee: Ben Mcmaster (Northern Ireland)

5 November 2024
14:30

Bologna (Italian Football Federation)	0–0	(French Football Federation) Monaco
	Report

Crespellano Training Center, Valsamoggia
Attendance: 340
Referee: Ewa Augustyn (Poland)

5 November 2024
15:00 (14:00 UTC+0)

Liverpool (The Football Association)	4–1	(German Football Association) Bayer Leverkusen
Morrison 36'; Pinnington 57'; Figueroa 75'; Kone-Doherty 90+2'	Report	Alajbegović 5' (pen.)

Liverpool FC Academy Training Ground, Kirkby
Attendance: 306
Referee: Georgi Ginchev (Bulgaria)

5 November 2024
15:00 (14:00 UTC+0)

Celtic (Scottish Football Association)	3–2	(German Football Association) RB Leipzig
Cummings 16', 65'; Weißbach 46' (o.g.)	Report	Masanka Bungi 67'; Schuldes 90+1'

Lesser Hampden, Glasgow
Attendance: 311
Referee: Joakim Östling (Sweden)

5 November 2024
16:00

Real Madrid (Royal Spanish Football Federation)	2–1	(Italian Football Federation) Milan
Yañez 12'; Fortea 19' (pen.)	Report	Sia 56'

Alfredo Di Stéfano Stadium, Madrid
Attendance: 669
Referee: Jacob Karlsen (Denmark)

5 November 2024
16:00

Borussia Dortmund (German Football Association)	2–3	(Austrian Football Association) Sturm Graz
Diallo 17'; Albert 79'	Report	Koita 23'; Ilic 68'; Grgic 84'

Dortmund Brackel Training Ground, Dortmund
Attendance: 893
Referee: Lina Lehtovaara (Finland)

5 November 2024
16:00

Lille (French Football Federation)	0–0	(Italian Football Federation) Juventus
	Report

Domaine de Luchin, Lille
Attendance: 647
Referee: Roman Jitari (Moldova)

6 November 2024
12:00

Shakhtar Donetsk (Ukrainian Association of Football)	3–2	(Swiss Football Association) Young Boys
Tsukanov 29'; Kostyuk 35'; Tyutyunov 43'	Report	Tsimba 11' (pen.); Bashmarin 82' (o.g.)

Parkstadion, Gelsenkirchen, Germany
Attendance: 308
Referee: Kamal Umudlu (Azerbaijan)

6 November 2024
13:00

Red Star Belgrade (Football Association of Serbia)	1–2	(Royal Spanish Football Federation) Barcelona
Kostov 14' (pen.)	Report	Alba 51'; Pradas 54'

Red Star Youth School Field, Belgrade
Attendance: 550
Referee: Lukasz Kuzma (Poland)

6 November 2024
13:00

Sparta Prague (Football Association of the Czech Republic)	1–1	(French Football Federation) Brest
Říha 72'	Report	Sambou 68'

Stadion Lokomotiva Praha, Prague
Attendance: 281
Referee: Miloš Savović (Montenegro)

6 November 2024
13:30

Club Brugge (Royal Belgian Football Association)	2–6	(The Football Association) Aston Villa
Da Silva 6'; Granados 31' (pen.)	Report	Burrowes 25'; Broggio 39' (pen.); Vandeperre 44' (o.g.); Jimoh-Aloba 72'; Cotcher 74', 80'

The NEST, Roeselare
Attendance: 750
Referee: Bence Csonka (Hungary)

6 November 2024
14:00

Feyenoord (Royal Dutch Football Association)	2–2	(Austrian Football Association) Red Bull Salzburg
Van Den Elshout 64'; Rudisill 68'	Report	Verhounig 47', 54'

Sportcomplex Varkenoord, Rotterdam
Attendance: 750
Referee: Catarina Campos (Portugal)

6 November 2024
14:30

Inter Milan (Italian Football Federation)	4–1	(The Football Association) Arsenal
De Pieri 8'; Spinacce 41'; Pinotti 69'; Lavelli 90+3'	Report	Kamara 74'

Youth Development Training Center, Milan
Attendance: 504
Referee: Shona Shukrula (Netherlands)

6 November 2024
15:00

VfB Stuttgart (German Football Association)	4–1	(Italian Football Federation) Atalanta
Tsigkas 9'; Bujupi 21' (pen.), 74'; Boakye 42'	Report	Arrigoni 56'

Gazi-Stadion auf der Waldau, Stuttgart
Attendance: 1,751
Referee: Danilo Nikolić (Serbia)

6 November 2024
16:00

Bayern Munich (German Football Association)	3–3	(Portuguese Football Federation) Benfica
Irankunda 23'; Kusi-Asare 70'; Mike 76'	Report	Varela 19'; Oliveira 45+2'; Ferreira 90+3'

FC Bayern Campus, Munich
Attendance: 850
Referee: Adam Ladebäck (Sweden)

6 November 2024
16:00

Paris Saint-Germain (French Football Federation)	4–2	(Royal Spanish Football Federation) Atlético Madrid
Sangaré 18', 31', 35' (pen.); Camara 45+1'	Report	Pan 49'; Castillo 88'

PSG Campus, Poissy
Attendance: 964
Referee: Zorbay Küçük (Turkey)

=== Matchday 5 ===
26 November 2024
13:00

Slovan Bratislava (Slovak Football Association)	2–3	(Italian Football Federation) Milan
Murár 26'; Kozyk 84'	Report	Liberali 43' (pen.); Scotti 62'; Bakoune 82'

National Training Centre, Senec
Attendance: 2,300
Referee: Georgi Ginchev (Bulgaria)

26 November 2024
13:00

Sparta Prague (Football Association of the Czech Republic)	1–2	(Royal Spanish Football Federation) Atlético Madrid
Horák 49'	Report	Janneh 8'; Belaid 27'

FK Viktoria Stadion, Prague
Attendance: 560
Referee: Christos Vergetis (Greece)

26 November 2024
14:00

Bayer Leverkusen (German Football Association)	0–1	(Austrian Football Association) Red Bull Salzburg
	Report	Trummer 16'

Ulrich-Haberland-Stadion, Leverkusen
Attendance: 450
Referee: Bulat Sariyev (Kazakhstan)

26 November 2024
14:00 (13:00 UTC+0)

Sporting CP (Portuguese Football Federation)	3–0	(The Football Association) Arsenal
Silva 7'; Santos 21'; Momade 73'	Report

Stadium Aurélio Pereira, Alcochete
Attendance: 560
Referee: Jacob Karlsen (Denmark)

26 November 2024
14:00

Young Boys (Swiss Football Association)	2–4	(Italian Football Federation) Atalanta
Lüthi 3'; Tsimba 21'	Report	Riccio 33', 62', 70'; Fiogbé 72' (pen.)

Sportpark Wyler, Bern
Attendance: 377
Referee: Granit Maqedonci (Sweden)

26 November 2024
14:30

Inter Milan (Italian Football Federation)	3–2	(German Football Association) RB Leipzig
Spinacce 48' (pen.); Topalović 63', 65'	Report	Bulland 25'; Voufack 90+4'

Youth Development Training Center, Milan
Attendance: 314
Referee: Miloš Bošković (Montenegro)

26 November 2024
16:00 (15:00 UTC+0)

Manchester City (The Football Association)	6–1	(Royal Dutch Football Association) Feyenoord
Heskey 10', 86'; Alfa-Ruprecht 37'; McAidoo 70', 72', 89' (pen.)	Report	Neijenhuis 55' (pen.)

Academy Stadium, Manchester
Attendance: 557
Referee: Alessandro Dudic (Switzerland)

26 November 2024
16:00

Bayern Munich (German Football Association)	2–5	(French Football Federation) Paris Saint-Germain
Nasrawe 78' (pen.); Aznou 78'	Report	Mbaye 8', 64'; Sangaré 36', 47', 70'

FC Bayern Campus, Munich
Attendance: 800
Referee: Jasper Vergoote (Belgium)

26 November 2024
16:00

Barcelona (Royal Spanish Football Federation)	2–0	(French Football Federation) Brest
Saca 10'; Hernández 54'	Report

Johan Cruyff Stadium, Sant Joan Despí
Attendance: 753
Referee: Peiman Simani (Finland)

27 November 2024
13:00

Red Star Belgrade (Football Association of Serbia)	1–1	(German Football Association) VfB Stuttgart
Kostov 60'	Report	Bujupi 5'

Red Star Youth School Field, Belgrade
Attendance: 550
Referee: Helgi Mikael Jónasson (Iceland)

27 November 2024
14:00

PSV Eindhoven (Royal Dutch Football Association)	1–1	(Ukrainian Association of Football) Shakhtar Donetsk
Van Duiven 55' (pen.)	Report	Drozd 76'

De Herdgang, Eindhoven
Attendance: 600
Referee: Joonas Jaanovits (Estonia)

27 November 2024
14:00

Dinamo Zagreb (Croatian Football Federation)	0–0	(German Football Association) Borussia Dortmund
	Report

Ivan Laljak-Ivić Stadium, Zaprešić
Attendance: 716
Referee: Henrik Nalbandyan (Armenia)

27 November 2024
14:00 (13:00 UTC+0)

Celtic (Scottish Football Association)	1–0	(Royal Belgian Football Association) Club Brugge
Cummings 8'	Report

Lesser Hampden, Glasgow
Attendance: 364
Referee: Jamie Robinson (Northern Ireland)

27 November 2024
14:00 (13:00 UTC+0)

Aston Villa (The Football Association)	0–2	(Italian Football Federation) Juventus
	Report	Biliboc 39', 66'

Bodymoor Heath Training Ground, Tamworth
Attendance: 263
Referee: Alan Kijas (Austria)

27 November 2024
14:00

Sturm Graz (Austrian Football Association)	0–0	(Royal Spanish Football Federation) Girona
	Report

Jacques Lemans Arena, St. Veit an der Glan
Attendance: 450
Referee: Kamal Umudlu (Azerbaijan)

27 November 2024
15:00

Monaco (French Football Federation)	1–0	(Portuguese Football Federation) Benfica
Michal 44'	Report

Stade de formation AS Monaco 1, La Turbie
Attendance: 250
Referee: Kadir Sağlam (Turkey)

27 November 2024
15:00

Bologna (Italian Football Federation)	2–2	(French Football Federation) Lille
Gattor 23'; Castaldo 51'	Report	Lachaab 21'; Touré 62'

Crespellano Training Center, Valsamoggia
Attendance: 340
Referee: Dalibor Černý (Czech Republic)

27 November 2024
16:00 (15:00 UTC+0)

Liverpool (The Football Association)	0–1	(Royal Spanish Football Federation) Real Madrid
	Report	Yañez 3'

Liverpool FC Academy Training Ground, Kirkby
Attendance: 482
Referee: Patrik Kolarić (Croatia)

=== Matchday 6 ===
10 December 2024
12:00

Shakhtar Donetsk (Ukrainian Association of Football)	0–2	(German Football Association) Bayern Munich
	Report	Scott 38'; Unsöld 80'

Parkstadion, Gelsenkirchen, Germany
Attendance: 621
Referee: Frida Klarlund (Denmark)

10 December 2024
12:00

Girona (Royal Spanish Football Federation)	2–2	(The Football Association) Liverpool
Arango 49' (pen.); Coromina 58'	Report	Danns 32' (pen.); Kone-Doherty 83'

Estadi Municipal de Olot, Olot
Attendance: 688
Referee: Mohammad Al-Emara (Finland)

10 December 2024
13:00

Dinamo Zagreb (Croatian Football Federation)	2–1	(Scottish Football Association) Celtic
Šutalo 1'; Rimac 35'	Report	Cummings 43'

Ivan Laljak-Ivić Stadium, Zaprešić
Attendance: 238
Referee: Florian Lata (Albania)

10 December 2024
14:00

Bayer Leverkusen (German Football Association)	0–1	(Italian Football Federation) Inter Milan
	Report	Zanchetta 63'

Ulrich-Haberland-Stadion, Leverkusen
Attendance: 611
Referee: Mikkel Redder (Denmark)

10 December 2024
14:00

Brest (French Football Federation)	1–3	(Royal Dutch Football Association) PSV Eindhoven
Le Guen 86'	Report	Fernandez 7'; Khaderi 40', 51'

Stade Francis-Le Blé, Brest
Attendance: 886
Referee: Martin Matoša (Slovenia)

10 December 2024
15:30

Club Brugge (Royal Belgian Football Association)	0–1	(Portuguese Football Federation) Sporting CP
	Report	Amengai 17' (o.g.)

The NEST, Roeselare
Attendance: 336
Referee: Lukasz Kuzma (Poland)

10 December 2024
15:30

Red Bull Salzburg (Austrian Football Association)	3–2	(French Football Federation) Paris Saint-Germain
Verhounig 22', 52'; Lukić 46'	Report	Sangaré 86'; Ndjantou 90+3'

Red Bull Akademie, Salzburg
Attendance: 425
Referee: Miloš Gigovic (Bosnia and Herzegovina)

10 December 2024
16:00

RB Leipzig (German Football Association)	3–4	(The Football Association) Aston Villa
Voufack 7'; Langsteiner 48', 70'	Report	Burrowes 5'; Jimoh-Aloba 55', 90+3'; Broggio 90+7' (pen.)

Stadion am Cottaweg, Leipzig
Attendance: 387
Referee: Damian Kos (Poland)

10 December 2024
16:00

Atalanta (Italian Football Federation)	0–4	(Royal Spanish Football Federation) Real Madrid
	Report	Facio 42' (pen.); Conde 66', 69'; Fortea 75'

Stadio Comunale, Caravaggio
Attendance: 743
Referee: Zorbay Küçük (Turkey)

11 December 2024
12:00 (11:00 UTC+0)

Benfica (Portuguese Football Federation)	3–0	(Italian Football Federation) Bologna
Moreira 4', 34' (pen.); Varela 59'	Report

Benfica Campus, Seixal
Attendance: 364
Referee: Ishmael Barbara (Malta)

11 December 2024
13:00

Lille (French Football Federation)	1–1	(Austrian Football Association) Sturm Graz
Diaoune 40'	Report	Grgic 54'

Domaine de Luchin, Lille
Attendance: 482
Referee: Edgars Maļcevs (Latvia)

11 December 2024
14:00

Atlético Madrid (Royal Spanish Football Federation)	5–0	(Slovak Football Association) Slovan Bratislava
Janneh 19'; Tománek 45+2' (o.g.); Esteban 62', 68', 78'	Report

Centro Deportivo Wanda Alcalá de Henares, Alcalá de Henares
Attendance: 230
Referee: Mohammad Usman Aslam (Norway)

11 December 2024
14:00

Juventus (Italian Football Federation)	1–1	(The Football Association) Manchester City
Mazur 20'	Report	Samuel 34'

Juventus Training Center, Turin
Attendance: 448
Referee: Jakob Sundberg (Denmark)

11 December 2024
14:00 (13:00 UTC+0)

Arsenal (The Football Association)	2–0	(French Football Federation) Monaco
Oulad M'Hand 22'; Copley 27'	Report

Meadow Park, Borehamwood
Attendance: 234
Referee: Tom Owen (Wales)

11 December 2024
14:00

Milan (Italian Football Federation)	1–3	(Football Association of Serbia) Red Star Belgrade
Mancioppi 85'	Report	Kostov 45+1'; Šljivić 58' (pen.); Jovanović 64'

Stadio Felice Chinetti, Solbiate Arno
Attendance: 203
Referee: Bence Csonka (Hungary)

11 December 2024
15:00

Feyenoord (Royal Dutch Football Association)	3–0	(Football Association of the Czech Republic) Sparta Prague
Rust 25'; Neijenhuis 90+3', 90+6'	Report

Sportcomplex Varkenoord, Rotterdam
Attendance: 735
Referee: Jovan Kachevski (North Macedonia)

11 December 2024
15:00

VfB Stuttgart (German Football Association)	2–1	(Swiss Football Association) Young Boys
Tsigkas 59', 74'	Report	Tsimba 73'

Gazi-Stadion auf der Waldau, Stuttgart
Attendance: 1,259
Referee: Alina Peşu (Romania)

11 December 2024
16:00

Borussia Dortmund (German Football Association)	2–3	(Royal Spanish Football Federation) Barcelona
Diallo 39'; Kaba 57'	Report	Virgili 48'; Farré 65'; Saca 82'

Dortmund Brackel Training Ground, Dortmund
Attendance: 1,480
Referee: Joakim Östling (Sweden)
