= 2024–25 UEFA Youth League =

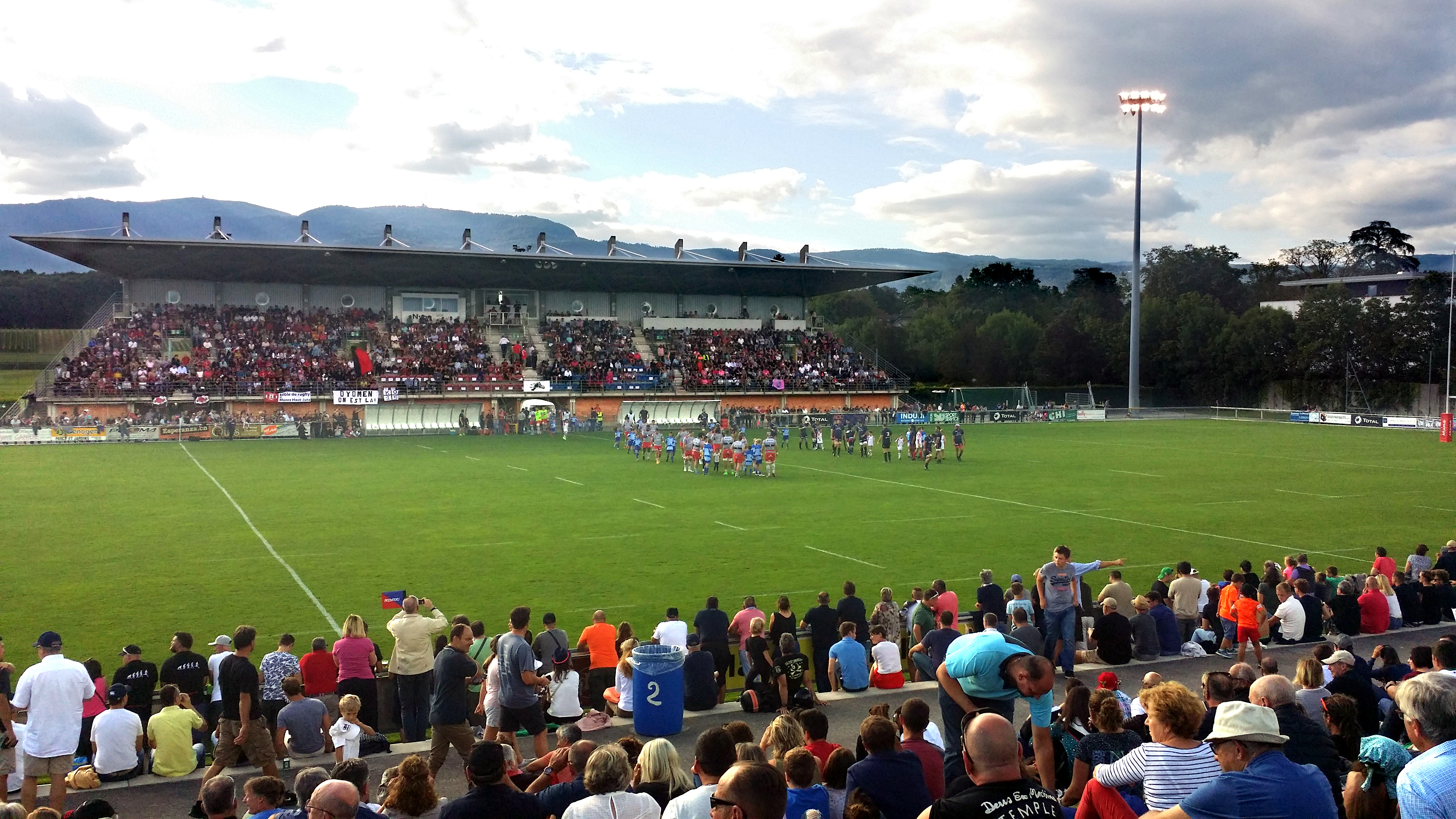
- The Colovray Stadium in Nyon hosted the semi-finals and final

Tournament details
- Dates: 17 September 2024 – 28 April 2025
- Teams: 88 (from 52 associations)

Final positions
- Champions: (Spain) Barcelona (3rd title)
- Runners-up: (Turkey) Trabzonspor

Tournament statistics
- Matches played: 221
- Goals scored: 761 (3.44 per match)
- Top scorer(s): (Ukraine) Matviy Ponomarenko (Dynamo Kyiv) (France) Mahamadou Sangaré (Paris Saint-Germain) (Austria) Phillip Verhounig (Red Bull Salzburg); 8 goals each

The 2024–25 UEFA Youth League was the eleventh season of the UEFA Youth League, a European youth club football competition organised by UEFA.

The title holders were Olympiacos, who defeated Milan 3–0 in the previous edition's final. They were eliminated in the quarter-finals by Red Bull Salzburg.

Barcelona claimed a record-breaking third title by defeating Trabzonspor 4–1 in the final.

== Teams ==
A total of 88 teams from 52 of the 55 UEFA member associations entered the tournament. They were split into two sections.

- UEFA Champions League Path: The youth teams of the 36 clubs which qualified for the 2024–25 UEFA Champions League league phase entered the UEFA Champions League Path. If there had been a vacancy (youth teams not entering), it would have been filled by a team defined by UEFA.
- Domestic Champions Path: The youth domestic champions of all UEFA associations (with the exception of Liechtenstein and San Marino, who do not have a youth domestic competition, and Russia, who was suspended from UEFA competitions) entered the Domestic Champions Path. Clubs from the top 28 associations according to their 2024 UEFA country coefficients qualified for the second round, with the remaining 24 teams starting from the first round. If the youth domestic champions qualify for the UEFA Champions League path, their spot was filled by the youth domestic runners-ups; if the runners-ups also qualify for the UEFA Champions League path, the vacancy was not filled (a change from previous editions where only the winners were taken into consideration).

Aberdeen, Academia Rebeja, Aston Villa, Auxerre, Bologna, Brera Strumica, Brest, Budućnost Podgorica, Bylis, Cliftonville, CSKA Sofia, FC 2 Korriku, FC Santa Coloma, Girona, HB, IFK Göteborg, IMT, Lincoln Red Imps, Progrès Niederkorn, Rapid Wien, Real Betis, Sabah, Sassuolo, Strømsgodset, Sturm Graz, Stuttgart, Tallinna Kalev, The New Saints, Valletta and Zbrojovka Brno made their tournament debuts.

Qualified teams for 2024–25 UEFA Youth League
Rank	Association	Teams	
Rank	Association	UEFA Champions League Path	Domestic Champions Path
1	England	Manchester City; Arsenal; Liverpool; Aston Villa	Manchester United (2023–24 U18 Premier League)
2	Spain	Barcelona; Real Madrid; Atlético Madrid; Girona	Real Betis (2023–24 División de Honor Juvenil U-19)
3	Germany	Bayern Munich; Borussia Dortmund; RB Leipzig; Bayer Leverkusen; VfB Stuttgart	TSG Hoffenheim (2023–24 A-Junioren-Bundesliga)
4	Italy	Inter Milan; Milan; Juventus; Atalanta; Bologna	Sassuolo (2023–24 Campionato Primavera 1)
5	France	Paris Saint-Germain; Monaco; Brest; Lille	Auxerre (2023–24 Championnat National U19)
6	Netherlands	PSV Eindhoven; Feyenoord	AZ (2023–24 Eredivisie U18)
7	Portugal	Benfica; Sporting CP	Braga (2023–24 Campeonato Nacional Juniores S19)
8	Belgium	Club Brugge	Genk (2023–24 Belgian U18 League)
9	Scotland	Celtic	Aberdeen (2023–24 Scottish U18 League)
10	Austria	Red Bull Salzburg; Sturm Graz	Rapid Wien (2023–25 Jugendliga U18)
11	Serbia	Red Star Belgrade	IMT (2023–24 Serbian U19 League)
12	Turkey		Trabzonspor (2023–24 U19 Elit)
13	Switzerland	Young Boys	Basel (2023–24 Swiss U18 League)
14	Ukraine	Shakhtar Donetsk	Dynamo Kyiv (2023–24 Ukrainian Premier League Under-19)
15	Czech Republic	Sparta Prague	Zbrojovka Brno (2023–24 Czech U19 League)
16	Norway		Strømsgodset (2023 Norwegian U19 Cup)
17	Denmark		Midtjylland (2023–24 U19 Ligaen)
19	Croatia	Dinamo Zagreb	Lokomotiva Zagreb (2023–24 1. HNL Juniori U19)
20	Greece		Olympiacos (2023–24 Superleague K19)
21	Israel		Maccabi Petah Tikva (2023–24 Israeli U19 Noar Premier League)
22	Cyprus		Pafos (2023–24 Cypriot U19 League)
23	Sweden		IFK Göteborg (2023 P17 Allsvenskan)
24	Poland		Legia Warsaw (2023–24 Polish U19 Central Junior League)
25	Hungary		Puskás Akadémia (2023–24 Hungarian U19 League)
26	Romania		Farul Constanța (2023–24 Liga de Tineret)
27	Bulgaria		CSKA Sofia (2023–24 U18 BFU Cup)
28	Slovakia	Slovan Bratislava	Trenčín (2023–24 Slovak U19 League)
29	Azerbaijan		Sabah (2023–24 Azerbaijani U19 League)
30	Kazakhstan		Kairat (2023 Kazakhstan U18 League)
31	Slovenia		Maribor (2023–24 Slovenian U19 League)
32	Moldova		Academia Rebeja (2023–24 Moldovan Youth League)
33	Kosovo		2 Korriku
35	Latvia		Daugavpils
36	Republic of Ireland		UCD
37	Finland		Honka (2023 U17 B-Junior League)
38	Lithuania		Žalgiris (2023 Lithuanian Elite Youth League U19 Division)
39	Armenia		Pyunik
40	Belarus		Dinamo Minsk (2023 Belarusian U18 League)
41	Bosnia and Herzegovina		Sarajevo (2023–24 Bosnia and Herzegovina U19 Junior League)
42	Luxembourg		Progrès Niederkorn
43	Faroe Islands		HB
44	Northern Ireland		Cliftonville
45	Malta		Valletta
46	Georgia		Dinamo Tbilisi
47	Estonia		Tallinna Kalev
48	Iceland		Stjarnan
49	Albania		Bylis
50	Wales		The New Saints
51	Gibraltar		Lincoln Red Imps
52	North Macedonia		AP Brera Strumica
53	Andorra		FC Santa Coloma
54	Montenegro		Budućnost Podgorica

Associations without any participating teams (no teams qualified for UEFA Champions League league phase, and either with no youth domestic competition)

Rank	Association
18	Russia
34	Liechtenstein
55	San Marino

Notes

1. ^{TH} Title holders.
2. ^{RU} Youth domestic runners-up playing in the Domestic Champions Path because the domestic champions qualified for the UEFA Champions League Path.
3. ^{YC} Teams playing in the UEFA Champions League Path which were also youth domestic champions.
4. ^{PO} Teams playing in the UEFA Champions League Path after their senior team qualified for the Champions League league phase via play-offs.
5. Russia (RUS): On 28 February 2022, Russian football clubs and national teams were suspended from FIFA and UEFA competitions due to the Russian invasion of Ukraine. The tables reflect Russia's ongoing suspension from UEFA competitions.

=== Distribution ===
Path	Round	Teams entering in this round	Teams advancing from the previous round
UEFA Champions League Path (36 teams)	League phase (36 teams)	36 youth teams whose senior sides qualified for the Champions League league phase	
Domestic Champions Path (52 teams)	First round (24 teams)	24 youth champions from associations 30–55 (except Liechtenstein and San Marino)	
Domestic Champions Path (52 teams)	Second round (40 teams)	28 youth champions from associations 1–29 (except Russia)	12 winners from the first round
Domestic Champions Path (52 teams)	Third round (20 teams)		20 winners from the second round
Knockout phase (32 teams)			22 teams ranked 1–22 from the league phase (UEFA Champions League Path); 10 winners from the third round (Domestic Champions Path)

The information here reflects the suspension of Russia in European football, and so the following changes to the default access list were made:

- The champions of associations 25 (Hungary) and 26 (Romania) entered the second round instead of the first round (Domestic Champions Path).

As the Youth League title holders (Olympiacos) qualified for the second round (Domestic Champions Path) via their domestic league, the following changes to the default access list were made:

- The champions of associations 27 (Bulgaria) and 28 (Slovakia) entered the second round instead of the first round (Domestic Champions Path).

As San Marino did not enter a team, the following changes to the default access list were made:

- The champions of associations 29 (Azerbaijan) entered the second round instead of the first round (Domestic Champions Path).

== Schedule ==
The schedule of the competition was as follows.

- For the UEFA Champions League Path league stage, in principle the teams played their matches on Tuesdays and Wednesdays of the matchdays as scheduled for UEFA Champions League, and on the same day as the corresponding senior teams; however, matches could also be played on other dates, including Mondays and Thursdays.
- For the Domestic Champions Path first and second rounds, in principle matches were played on Wednesdays (first round on matchdays 2 and 3, second round on matchdays 4 and 5, as scheduled for UEFA Champions League); however, matches could also be played on other dates, including Mondays, Tuesdays and Thursdays.

Schedule for 2024–25 UEFA Youth League
Phase	Round	Draw date	First leg	Second leg
UEFA Champions League Path	Matchday 1	29 August 2024	17–19 September 2024	
UEFA Champions League Path	Matchday 2	29 August 2024	1–2 October 2024	
UEFA Champions League Path	Matchday 3	29 August 2024	22–23 October 2024	
UEFA Champions League Path	Matchday 4	29 August 2024	5–6 November 2024	
UEFA Champions League Path	Matchday 5	29 August 2024	26–27 November 2024	
UEFA Champions League Path	Matchday 6	29 August 2024	10–11 December 2024	
Domestic; Champions Path	First round	3 September 2024	18 September 2024	2 October 2024
Domestic; Champions Path	Second round	3 September 2024	23 October 2024	6 November 2024
Domestic; Champions Path	Third round	3 September 2024	27 November 2024	17 December 2024
Knockout phase	Round of 32	20 December 2024	11–12 February 2025	
Knockout phase	Round of 16	14 February 2025	4–5 March 2025	
Knockout phase	Quarter-finals	14 February 2025	1–2 April 2025	
Knockout phase	Semi-finals	14 February 2025	25 April 2025 Colovray Stadium, Nyon	
Knockout phase	Final	14 February 2025	28 April 2025 Colovray Stadium, Nyon	

== UEFA Champions League Path ==
For the UEFA Champions League Path, the 36 teams played six matches (three home and three away) following the same schedule as the first six matchdays of the 2024–25 UEFA Champions League league phase. The top 22 teams advanced to knockout phase.

=== Table ===
Pos	Team	Pld	W	D	L	GF	GA	GD	Pts	Qualification
1	(Italian Football Federation) Inter Milan	6	6	0	0	19	7	+12	18	Advance to knockout phase
2	(Portuguese Football Federation) Sporting CP	6	5	1	0	13	3	+10	16	Advance to knockout phase
3	(Austrian Football Association) Red Bull Salzburg	6	5	1	0	17	9	+8	16	Advance to knockout phase
4	(Royal Spanish Football Federation) Barcelona	6	5	0	1	17	10	+7	15	Advance to knockout phase
5	(German Football Association) VfB Stuttgart	6	4	1	1	13	6	+7	13	Advance to knockout phase
6	(Royal Spanish Football Federation) Real Madrid	6	4	0	2	10	5	+5	12	Advance to knockout phase
7	(Italian Football Federation) Atalanta	6	4	0	2	14	12	+2	12	Advance to knockout phase
8	(Royal Spanish Football Federation) Atlético Madrid	6	3	2	1	16	8	+8	11	Advance to knockout phase
9	(Portuguese Football Federation) Benfica	6	3	2	1	12	7	+5	11	Advance to knockout phase
10	(Italian Football Federation) Juventus	6	3	2	1	9	4	+5	11	Advance to knockout phase
11	(The Football Association) Manchester City	6	3	1	2	16	8	+8	10	Advance to knockout phase
12	(Royal Spanish Football Federation) Girona	6	2	4	0	9	5	+4	10	Advance to knockout phase
13	(German Football Association) Bayern Munich	6	3	1	2	11	12	−1	10	Advance to knockout phase
14	(Ukrainian Association of Football) Shakhtar Donetsk	6	3	1	2	9	11	−2	10	Advance to knockout phase
15	(The Football Association) Aston Villa	6	3	0	3	14	11	+3	9	Advance to knockout phase
16	(Austrian Football Association) Sturm Graz	6	2	3	1	10	8	+2	9	Advance to knockout phase
17	(Scottish Football Association) Celtic	6	3	0	3	10	10	0	9	Advance to knockout phase
18	(German Football Association) Borussia Dortmund	6	2	2	2	11	8	+3	8	Advance to knockout phase
19	(The Football Association) Liverpool	6	2	2	2	9	8	+1	8	Advance to knockout phase
20	(French Football Federation) Lille	6	1	5	0	8	7	+1	8	Advance to knockout phase
21	(Croatian Football Federation) Dinamo Zagreb	6	2	2	2	8	8	0	8	Advance to knockout phase
22	(French Football Federation) Monaco	6	2	2	2	6	7	−1	8	Advance to knockout phase
23	(French Football Federation) Paris Saint-Germain	6	2	1	3	14	13	+1	7	
24	(German Football Association) Bayer Leverkusen	6	2	1	3	7	9	−2	7	
25	(Royal Dutch Football Association) PSV Eindhoven	6	1	3	2	8	9	−1	6	
26	(The Football Association) Arsenal	6	2	0	4	5	12	−7	6	
27	(Italian Football Federation) Milan	6	1	2	3	7	11	−4	5 (Note: Away goals scored: Milan 5; Red Star Belgrade 4.)	
28	(Football Association of Serbia) Red Star Belgrade	6	1	2	3	7	11	−4	5	
29	(Royal Dutch Football Association) Feyenoord	6	1	1	4	7	14	−7	4	
30	(Swiss Football Association) Young Boys	6	1	0	5	11	17	−6	3	
31	(Royal Belgian Football Association) Club Brugge	6	0	3	3	5	11	−6	3	
32	(German Football Association) RB Leipzig	6	1	0	5	10	18	−8	3	
33	(Italian Football Federation) Bologna	6	0	2	4	7	14	−7	2	
34	(French Football Federation) Brest	6	0	2	4	5	16	−11	2	
35	(Slovak Football Association) Slovan Bratislava	6	0	2	4	6	20	−14	2	
36	(Football Association of the Czech Republic) Sparta Prague	6	0	1	5	4	15	−11	1	

Source: UEFA
Rules for classification: League phase tiebreakers

=== Results ===
Matchday 1
Home team	Score	Away team
Young Boys (Switzerland)	2–1	(England) Aston Villa
Juventus (Italy)	1–0	(Netherlands) PSV Eindhoven
Milan (Italy)	0–0	(England) Liverpool
Bayern Munich (Germany)	2–1	(Croatia) Dinamo Zagreb
Real Madrid (Spain)	1–0	(Germany) VfB Stuttgart
Sporting CP (Portugal)	2–2	(France) Lille
Sparta Prague (Czech Republic)	2–3	(Austria) Red Bull Salzburg
Bologna (Italy)	3–4	(Ukraine) Shakhtar Donetsk
Celtic (Scotland)	4–0	(Slovakia) Slovan Bratislava
Club Brugge (Belgium)	1–1	(Germany) Borussia Dortmund
Manchester City (England)	2–4	(Italy) Inter Milan
Paris Saint-Germain (France)	0–2	(Spain) Girona
Feyenoord (Netherlands)	1–2	(Germany) Bayer Leverkusen
Red Star Belgrade (Serbia)	1–2	(Portugal) Benfica
Monaco (France)	4–3	(Spain) Barcelona
Atalanta (Italy)	4–1	(England) Arsenal
Atlético Madrid (Spain)	4–0	(Germany) RB Leipzig
Brest (France)	1–4	(Austria) Sturm Graz

Matchday 2
Home team	Score	Away team
Red Bull Salzburg (Austria)	5–1	(France) Brest
VfB Stuttgart (Germany)	3–0	(Czech Republic) Sparta Prague
Arsenal (England)	1–0	(France) Paris Saint-Germain
Bayer Leverkusen (Germany)	3–1	(Italy) Milan
Borussia Dortmund (Germany)	4–0	(Scotland) Celtic
Barcelona (Spain)	4–2	(Switzerland) Young Boys
Inter Milan (Italy)	4–0	(Serbia) Red Star Belgrade
PSV Eindhoven (Netherlands)	0–2	(Portugal) Sporting CP
Slovan Bratislava (Slovakia)	0–4	(England) Manchester City
Shakhtar Donetsk (Ukraine)	0–3	(Italy) Atalanta
Girona (Spain)	2–0	(Netherlands) Feyenoord
Aston Villa (England)	0–1	(Germany) Bayern Munich
Dinamo Zagreb (Croatia)	1–0	(France) Monaco
Liverpool (England)	2–1	(Italy) Bologna
Lille (France)	2–1	(Spain) Real Madrid
RB Leipzig (Germany)	0–3	(Italy) Juventus
Sturm Graz (Austria)	1–1	(Belgium) Club Brugge
Benfica (Portugal)	2–2	(Spain) Atlético Madrid

Matchday 3
Home team	Score	Away team
Milan (Italy)	1–1	(Belgium) Club Brugge
Monaco (France)	1–1	(Serbia) Red Star Belgrade
Arsenal (England)	0–1	(Ukraine) Shakhtar Donetsk
Aston Villa (England)	3–1	(Italy) Bologna
Girona (Spain)	2–2	(Slovakia) Slovan Bratislava
Juventus (Italy)	2–3	(Germany) VfB Stuttgart
Paris Saint-Germain (France)	3–3	(Netherlands) PSV Eindhoven
Real Madrid (Spain)	1–2	(Germany) Borussia Dortmund
Sturm Graz (Austria)	1–3	(Portugal) Sporting CP
Atalanta (Italy)	2–1	(Scotland) Celtic
Brest (France)	1–1	(Germany) Bayer Leverkusen
Atlético Madrid (Spain)	1–1	(France) Lille
Young Boys (Switzerland)	2–3	(Italy) Inter Milan
Barcelona (Spain)	3–1	(Germany) Bayern Munich
Red Bull Salzburg (Austria)	3–2	(Croatia) Dinamo Zagreb
Manchester City (England)	3–0	(Czech Republic) Sparta Prague
RB Leipzig (Germany)	3–1	(England) Liverpool
Benfica (Portugal)	2–0	(Netherlands) Feyenoord

Matchday 4
Home team	Score	Away team
PSV Eindhoven (Netherlands)	1–1	(Spain) Girona
Slovan Bratislava (Slovakia)	2–2	(Croatia) Dinamo Zagreb
Bologna (Italy)	0–0	(France) Monaco
Borussia Dortmund (Germany)	2–3	(Austria) Sturm Graz
Celtic (Scotland)	3–2	(Germany) RB Leipzig
Liverpool (England)	4–1	(Germany) Bayer Leverkusen
Lille (France)	0–0	(Italy) Juventus
Real Madrid (Spain)	2–1	(Italy) Milan
Sporting CP (Portugal)	2–0	(England) Manchester City
Club Brugge (Belgium)	2–6	(England) Aston Villa
Shakhtar Donetsk (Ukraine)	3–2	(Switzerland) Young Boys
Sparta Prague (Czech Republic)	1–1	(France) Brest
Bayern Munich (Germany)	3–3	(Portugal) Benfica
Inter Milan (Italy)	4–1	(England) Arsenal
Feyenoord (Netherlands)	2–2	(Austria) Red Bull Salzburg
Red Star Belgrade (Serbia)	1–2	(Spain) Barcelona
Paris Saint-Germain (France)	4–2	(Spain) Atlético Madrid
VfB Stuttgart (Germany)	4–1	(Italy) Atalanta

Matchday 5
Home team	Score	Away team
Sparta Prague (Czech Republic)	1–2	(Spain) Atlético Madrid
Slovan Bratislava (Slovakia)	2–3	(Italy) Milan
Bayer Leverkusen (Germany)	0–1	(Austria) Red Bull Salzburg
Young Boys (Switzerland)	2–4	(Italy) Atalanta
Barcelona (Spain)	2–0	(France) Brest
Bayern Munich (Germany)	2–5	(France) Paris Saint-Germain
Inter Milan (Italy)	3–2	(Germany) RB Leipzig
Manchester City (England)	6–1	(Netherlands) Feyenoord
Sporting CP (Portugal)	3–0	(England) Arsenal
Red Star Belgrade (Serbia)	1–1	(Germany) VfB Stuttgart
Sturm Graz (Austria)	0–0	(Spain) Girona
Monaco (France)	1–0	(Portugal) Benfica
Aston Villa (England)	0–2	(Italy) Juventus
Bologna (Italy)	2–2	(France) Lille
Celtic (Scotland)	1–0	(Belgium) Club Brugge
Dinamo Zagreb (Croatia)	0–0	(Germany) Borussia Dortmund
Liverpool (England)	0–1	(Spain) Real Madrid
PSV Eindhoven (Netherlands)	1–1	(Ukraine) Shakhtar Donetsk

Matchday 6
Home team	Score	Away team
Girona (Spain)	2–2	(England) Liverpool
Dinamo Zagreb (Croatia)	2–1	(Scotland) Celtic
Atalanta (Italy)	0–4	(Spain) Real Madrid
Bayer Leverkusen (Germany)	0–1	(Italy) Inter Milan
Club Brugge (Belgium)	0–1	(Portugal) Sporting CP
Red Bull Salzburg (Austria)	3–2	(France) Paris Saint-Germain
Shakhtar Donetsk (Ukraine)	0–2	(Germany) Bayern Munich
RB Leipzig (Germany)	3–4	(England) Aston Villa
Brest (France)	1–3	(Netherlands) PSV Eindhoven
Atlético Madrid (Spain)	5–0	(Slovakia) Slovan Bratislava
Lille (France)	1–1	(Austria) Sturm Graz
Milan (Italy)	1–3	(Serbia) Red Star Belgrade
Arsenal (England)	2–0	(France) Monaco
Borussia Dortmund (Germany)	2–3	(Spain) Barcelona
Feyenoord (Netherlands)	3–0	(Czech Republic) Sparta Prague
Juventus (Italy)	1–1	(England) Manchester City
Benfica (Portugal)	3–0	(Italy) Bologna
VfB Stuttgart (Germany)	2–1	(Switzerland) Young Boys

== Domestic Champions Path ==
For the Domestic Champions Path, the 52 teams were drawn into three rounds of two-legged home-and-away ties, with the 28 clubs from the top ranked associations starting directly from the second round. The draw for all three rounds were held on 3 September 2024.

The ten third round winners advanced to the round of 32.

=== First round ===
The first legs were played on 17 and 18 September, and the second legs on 22 September, 1 and 2 October 2024.

The winners of the ties advanced to the second round.

First round
Team 1	Agg.	Team 2	1st leg	2nd leg
HB (Faroe Islands)	1–5	(Luxembourg) Progrès Niederkorn	1–2	0–3
UCD (Republic of Ireland)	5–3	(Iceland) Stjarnan	3–0	2–3
Bylis (Albania)	2–4	(Kosovo) 2 Korriku	1–2	1–2
Lincoln Red Imps (Gibraltar)	0–8	(Slovenia) Maribor	0–6	0–2
Žalgiris (Lithuania)	7–2	(Wales) The New Saints	3–2	4–0
Honka (Finland)	3–3 (0–3 p)	(Malta) Valletta	1–0	2–3
Daugavpils (Latvia)	2–2 (4–2 p)	(Northern Ireland) Cliftonville	1–0	1–2
Tallinna Kalev (Estonia)	11–0	(Andorra) FC Santa Coloma	7–0	4–0
AP Brera Strumica (North Macedonia)	2–4	(Bosnia and Herzegovina) Sarajevo	2–2	0–2
Dinamo Minsk (Belarus)	6–3	(Armenia) Pyunik	4–2	2–1
Kairat (Kazakhstan)	6–2	(Moldova) Academia Rebeja	2–1	4–1
Dinamo Tbilisi (Georgia (country))	4–6	(Montenegro) Budućnost Podgorica	3–2	1–4

=== Second round ===
The first legs were played on 22, 23 October and 5 November, and the second legs on 27 October, 5, 6 and 9 November 2024.

The winners of the ties advanced to the third round.

Second round
Team 1	Agg.	Team 2	1st leg	2nd leg
IFK Göteborg (Sweden)	1–7	(Germany) TSG Hoffenheim	0–3	1–4
Aberdeen (Scotland)	1–8	(Hungary) Puskás Akadémia	1–5	0–3
Strømsgodset (Norway)	2–8	(Netherlands) AZ	1–4	1–4
2 Korriku (Kosovo)	5–2	(Republic of Ireland) UCD	2–1	3–1
Progrès Niederkorn (Luxembourg)	0–9	(Denmark) Midtjylland	0–4	0–5
Žalgiris (Lithuania)	2–11	(England) Manchester United	2–5	0–6
Dynamo Kyiv (Ukraine)	4–2	(Slovenia) Maribor	1–1	3–1
Genk (Belgium)	6–2	(Bulgaria) CSKA Sofia	3–1	3–1
Legia Warsaw (Poland)	6–0	(Cyprus) Pafos	3–0	3–0
Auxerre (France)	7–0	(Malta) Valletta	5–0	2–0
Daugavpils (Latvia)	0–9	(Italy) Sassuolo	0–5	0–4
Farul Constanța (Romania)	2–1	(Serbia) IMT	2–0	0–1
Olympiacos (Greece)	7–1	(Estonia) Tallinna Kalev	5–0	2–1
Basel (Switzerland)	8–1	(Azerbaijan) Sabah	6–0	2–1
Maccabi Petah Tikva (Israel)	0–6	(Bosnia and Herzegovina) Sarajevo	0–3 (Note: Both legs were cancelled and awarded 3–0 to Sarajevo after Maccabi Petah Tikva withdrew due to security concerns stemming from the Gaza war.)	0–3
Trabzonspor (Turkey)	8–3	(Montenegro) Budućnost Podgorica	3–1	5–2
Braga (Portugal)	2–3	(Austria) Rapid Wien	0–0	2–3
Real Betis (Spain)	11–1	(Kazakhstan) Kairat	6–1	5–0
Trenčín (Slovakia)	6–3	(Czech Republic) Zbrojovka Brno	3–2	3–1
Lokomotiva Zagreb (Croatia)	2–1	(Belarus) Dinamo Minsk	2–1	0–0

=== Third round ===
The first legs will be played on 26 and 27 November, and the second legs on 10, 11 and 17 December 2024.

The winners of the ties will advance to the knockout phase.

Third round
Team 1	Agg.	Team 2	1st leg	2nd leg
Dynamo Kyiv (Ukraine)	9–1	(Kosovo) 2 Korriku	5–0	4–1
AZ (Netherlands)	2–1	(England) Manchester United	2–1	0–0
Puskás Akadémia (Hungary)	2–2 (6–5 p)	(Belgium) Genk	1–0	1–2
Auxerre (France)	1–3	(Germany) TSG Hoffenheim	1–2	0–1
Legia Warsaw (Poland)	0–9	(Denmark) Midtjylland	0–2	0–7
Real Betis (Spain)	4–2	(Italy) Sassuolo	3–1	1–1
Farul Constanța (Romania)	1–6	(Croatia) Lokomotiva Zagreb	0–2	1–4
Trenčín (Slovakia)	2–5	(Greece) Olympiacos	1–1	1–4
Basel (Switzerland)	1–5	(Austria) Rapid Wien	1–2	0–3
Sarajevo (Bosnia and Herzegovina)	3–8	(Turkey) Trabzonspor	2–2	1–6

== Knockout phase ==
The top 22 teams from the UEFA Champions League Path as well as 10 winners of the Domestic Champions Path qualified for the knockout phase, which were played in a single-leg knockout format. For the round of 32, the top six teams from the UEFA Champions League Path were paired against the teams finished in 17th to 22nd place, and the Domestic Champions Path winners were paired against teams ranked 7th to 16th.

=== Bracket ===
Round of 32
(Austria) Red Bull Salzburg (p)	1 (4)
(Scotland) Celtic	1 (2)
(Austria) Rapid Wien	1
(Spain) Atlético Madrid	2
(Croatia) Lokomotiva Zagreb	1 (3)
(Austria) Sturm Graz (p)	1 (5)
(Greece) Olympiacos	1
(Spain) Girona	0
(Turkey) Trabzonspor	1
(Italy) Juventus	0
(Ukraine) Dynamo Kyiv	3 (6)
(Italy) Atalanta (p)	3 (7)
(Spain) Real Betis	0
(Germany) Bayern Munich	1
(Italy) Inter Milan	3
(France) Lille	1
(Spain) Real Madrid	2
(Germany) Borussia Dortmund	0
(Netherlands) AZ (p)	2 (4)
(Portugal) Benfica	2 (3)
(Germany) TSG Hoffenheim	5
(Ukraine) Shakhtar Donetsk	1
(Denmark) Midtjylland	2 (4)
(England) Manchester City (p)	2 (5)
(Portugal) Sporting CP	4
(France) Monaco	0
(Germany) VfB Stuttgart (p)	2 (5)
(England) Liverpool	2 (3)
(Hungary) Puskás Akadémia	1
(England) Aston Villa	2
(Spain) Barcelona (p)	2 (5)
(Croatia) Dinamo Zagreb	2 (3)

Round of 16
(Austria) Red Bull Salzburg	2
(Spain) Atlético Madrid	1
(Austria) Sturm Graz	1 (4)
(Greece) Olympiacos	1 (5)
(Turkey) Trabzonspor	0 (5)
(Italy) Atalanta	0 (3)
(Germany) Bayern Munich	1 (4)
(Italy) Inter Milan	1 (5)
(Spain) Real Madrid	0
(Netherlands) AZ	2
(Germany) TSG Hoffenheim	1
(England) Manchester City	2
(Portugal) Sporting CP	2
(Germany) VfB Stuttgart	3
(England) Aston Villa	1
(Spain) Barcelona	3

Quarter-finals
(Austria) Red Bull Salzburg	1
(Greece) Olympiacos	0
(Turkey) Trabzonspor	1
(Italy) Inter Milan	0
(Netherlands) AZ	1
(England) Manchester City	0
(Germany) VfB Stuttgart	1
(Spain) Barcelona	2

Semi-finals
25 April – Nyon
(Austria) Red Bull Salzburg	1
(Turkey) Trabzonspor	2
25 April – Nyon
(Netherlands) AZ	0
(Spain) Barcelona	1

Final
28 April – Nyon
(Turkey) Trabzonspor	1
(Spain) Barcelona	4

=== Round of 32 ===
The matches were played on 11 and 12 February 2025.

Round of 32
Home team	Score	Away team
Inter Milan (Italy)	3–1	(France) Lille
Sporting CP (Portugal)	4–0	(France) Monaco
Red Bull Salzburg (Austria)	1–1 (4–2 p)	(Scotland) Celtic
Barcelona (Spain)	2–2 (5–3 p)	(Croatia) Dinamo Zagreb
VfB Stuttgart (Germany)	2–2 (5–3 p)	(England) Liverpool
Real Madrid (Spain)	2–0	(Germany) Borussia Dortmund
Dynamo Kyiv (Ukraine)	3–3 (6–7 p)	(Italy) Atalanta
Rapid Wien (Austria)	1–2	(Spain) Atlético Madrid
AZ (Netherlands)	2–2 (4–3 p)	(Portugal) Benfica
Trabzonspor (Turkey)	1–0	(Italy) Juventus
Midtjylland (Denmark)	2–2 (4–5 p)	(England) Manchester City
Olympiacos (Greece)	1–0	(Spain) Girona
Real Betis (Spain)	0–1	(Germany) Bayern Munich
TSG Hoffenheim (Germany)	5–1	(Ukraine) Shakhtar Donetsk
Puskás Akadémia (Hungary)	1–2	(England) Aston Villa
Lokomotiva Zagreb (Croatia)	1–1 (3–5 p)	(Austria) Sturm Graz

=== Round of 16 ===
The draw was conducted on 14 February 2025 at 13:00 CET in the UEFA headquarters in Nyon. The round of 16 was played over one leg on 4 and 5 March 2025.

Round of 16
Home team	Score	Away team
Trabzonspor (Turkey)	0–0 (5–3 p)	(Italy) Atalanta
Sturm Graz (Austria)	1–1 (4–5 p)	(Greece) Olympiacos
Bayern Munich (Germany)	1–1 (4–5 p)	(Italy) Inter Milan
Red Bull Salzburg (Austria)	2–1	(Spain) Atlético Madrid
Real Madrid (Spain)	0–2	(Netherlands) AZ
Sporting CP (Portugal)	2–3	(Germany) VfB Stuttgart
TSG Hoffenheim (Germany)	1–2	(England) Manchester City
Aston Villa (England)	1–3	(Spain) Barcelona

=== Quarter-finals ===
The draw was conducted on 14 February 2025 at 13:00 CET in the UEFA headquarters in Nyon. The quarter-finals were played over one leg on 1 and 2 April 2025.

Quarter-finals
Home team	Score	Away team
AZ (Netherlands)	1–0	(England) Manchester City
VfB Stuttgart (Germany)	1–2	(Spain) Barcelona
Red Bull Salzburg (Austria)	1–0	(Greece) Olympiacos
Trabzonspor (Turkey)	1–0	(Italy) Inter Milan

=== Semi-finals ===
The draw was conducted on 14 February 2025 at 13:00 CET in the UEFA headquarters in Nyon. The semi-finals will be played over one leg on 25 April 2025.

Semi-finals
Team 1	Score	Team 2
AZ (Netherlands)	0–1	(Spain) Barcelona
Red Bull Salzburg (Austria)	1–2	(Turkey) Trabzonspor

=== Final ===
The final was played on 28 April 2025 at Colovray Stadium, Nyon.

28 April 2025
18:00

Trabzonspor (Turkey)	1–4	(Spain) Barcelona
Tibukoğlu 88'	Report	Diarra 11', 68'; Cuenca 18'; Alba 57'

Colovray Stadium, Nyon
Attendance: 3,081
Referee: Andrea Colombo (Italy)

== Top goalscorers ==
Rank	Player	Team	Goals	Matches played
1	(Austria) Phillip Verhounig	(Austria) Red Bull Salzburg	8	7
1	(France) Mahamadou Sangaré	(France) Paris Saint-Germain	8	6
1	(Ukraine) Matviy Ponomarenko	(Ukraine) Dynamo Kyiv	8	5
4	(Spain) Omar Janneh	(Spain) Atlético Madrid	6	8
4	(Portugal) Gustavo Varela	(Portugal) Benfica	6	7
4	(Scotland) Daniel Cummings	(Scotland) Celtic	6	7
4	(Lithuania) Romualdas Jansonas	(Lithuania) Žalgiris	6	4
4	(Turkey) Poyraz Efe Yıldırım	(Turkey) Trabzonspor	6	3
9	(Spain) Arnau Pradas	(Spain) Barcelona	5	11
9	(Spain) Hugo Alba	(Spain) Barcelona	5	10
9	(Portugal) Gabriel Silva	(Portugal) Sporting CP	5	8
9	(Greece) Stavros Pnevmonidis	(Greece) Olympiacos	5	7
9	(Benin) Candas Fiogbé	(Italy) Atalanta	5	6
9	(Kosovo) Eliot Bujupi	(Germany) VfB Stuttgart	5	6
9	(Croatia) Leon Grgic	(Austria) Sturm Graz	5	6
9	(Hungary) Kevin Mondovics	(Hungary) Puskás Akadémia	5	5
9	(Denmark) Nicolaj Tornvig	(Denmark) Midtjylland	5	5

== See also ==
- Under-20 Intercontinental Cup
- 2024–25 UEFA Champions League
