= 2024–25 UEFA Youth League Domestic Champions Path =

Part of football competition

The 2024–25 UEFA Youth League Domestic Champions Path began on 17 September and ended on 11 December 2024. A total of 52 teams competed in the Domestic Champions Path to decide 10 of the 32 places in the knockout phase of the 2024–25 UEFA Youth League.

Times are CET or CEST, (Note: CEST (UTC+2) for dates up to 26 October 2024, and CET (UTC+1) for dates thereafter.) as listed by UEFA (local times, if different, are in parentheses).

== Format ==
In the Domestic Champions Path, each tie was played over two legs, with each team playing one leg at home. The team that scored more goals on aggregate over the two legs advanced to the next round. If the aggregate score was level, as the away goals rule was scrapped, the match would be decided by a penalty shoot-out with no extra time played.

The ten third round winners advanced to the knockout phase, where they were joined by the 22 best-ranked teams from the UEFA Champions League Path.

== Teams ==
The Domestic Champions Path included 52 youth domestic champions (or runners-up, if the champions qualified for the UEFA Champions League Path) and consisted of the following rounds:

- First round (24 teams): 24 teams from the 24 lower-ranked member associations according to their 2024 UEFA country coefficients.
- Second round (40 teams): 28 teams from the top 28 member associations according to UEFA country coefficients, and 12 winners of the first round.
- Third round (20 teams): 20 winners of the second round.

Below were the participating teams of the Domestic Champions Path, grouped by their starting rounds.

Key to colours
Winners of third round advanced to knockout phase

| Second round Team (Greece) Olympiacos (England) Manchester United (Spain) Real Betis (Germany) TSG Hoffenheim (Italy) Sassuolo (France) Auxerre (Netherlands) AZ (Portugal) Braga (Belgium) Genk (Scotland) Aberdeen (Austria) Rapid Wien (Serbia) IMT (Turkey) Trabzonspor (Switzerland) Basel (Ukraine) Dynamo Kyiv (Czech Republic) Zbrojovka Brno (Norway) Strømsgodset (Denmark) Midtjylland (Croatia) Lokomotiva Zagreb (Israel) Maccabi Petah Tikva (Cyprus) Pafos (Sweden) IFK Göteborg (Poland) Legia Warsaw (Hungary) Puskás Akadémia (Romania) Farul Constanța (Bulgaria) CSKA Sofia (Slovakia) Trenčín (Azerbaijan) Sabah | First round Team (Kazakhstan) Kairat (Slovenia) Maribor (Moldova) Academia Rebeja (Kosovo) 2 Korriku (Latvia) Daugavpils (Republic of Ireland) UCD (Finland) Honka (Lithuania) Žalgiris (Armenia) Pyunik (Belarus) Dinamo Minsk (Bosnia and Herzegovina) Sarajevo (Luxembourg) Progrès Niederkorn (Faroe Islands) HB (Northern Ireland) Cliftonville (Malta) Valletta (Georgia (country)) Dinamo Tbilisi (Estonia) Tallinna Kalev (Iceland) Stjarnan (Albania) Bylis (Wales) The New Saints (Gibraltar) Lincoln Red Imps (North Macedonia) AP Brera Strumica (Andorra) FC Santa Coloma (Montenegro) Budućnost Podgorica |

Notes

1. ^{TH} Title holders

== First round ==
=== Draw ===
The draw for the first round was held on 3 September 2024. There was no seeding. The 24 teams were split into three groups of eight teams. Teams in the same group were drawn against each other, with the order of legs decided by draw.

| Group 1 | Group 2 | Group 3 |
|---|---|---|
| (Slovenia) Maribor; (Kosovo) 2 Korriku; (Republic of Ireland) UCD; (Luxembourg) Progrès Niederkorn; (Faroe Islands) HB; (Iceland) Stjarnan; (Albania) Bylis; (Gibraltar) Lincoln Red Imps | (Latvia) Daugavpils; (Finland) Honka; (Lithuania) Žalgiris; (Northern Ireland) Cliftonville; (Malta) Valletta; (Estonia) Tallinna Kalev; (Wales) The New Saints; (Andorra) FC Santa Coloma | (Kazakhstan) Kairat; (Moldova) Academia Rebeja; (Armenia) Pyunik; (Belarus) Dinamo Minsk; (Bosnia and Herzegovina) Sarajevo; (Georgia (country)) Dinamo Tbilisi; (North Macedonia) AP Brera Strumica; (Montenegro) Budućnost Podgorica |

=== Summary ===
The first legs were played on 17 and 18 September, and the second legs on 22 September, 1 and 2 October 2024.

The winners of the ties advanced to the second round.

First round
| Team 1 | Agg. | Team 2 | 1st leg | 2nd leg |
|---|---|---|---|---|
| HB (Faroe Islands) | 1–5 | (Luxembourg) Progrès Niederkorn | 1–2 | 0–3 |
| UCD (Republic of Ireland) | 5–3 | (Iceland) Stjarnan | 3–0 | 2–3 |
| Bylis (Albania) | 2–4 | (Kosovo) 2 Korriku | 1–2 | 1–2 |
| Lincoln Red Imps (Gibraltar) | 0–8 | (Slovenia) Maribor | 0–6 | 0–2 |
| Žalgiris (Lithuania) | 7–2 | (Wales) The New Saints | 3–2 | 4–0 |
| Honka (Finland) | 3–3 (0–3 p) | (Malta) Valletta | 1–0 | 2–3 |
| Daugavpils (Latvia) | 2–2 (4–2 p) | (Northern Ireland) Cliftonville | 1–0 | 1–2 |
| Tallinna Kalev (Estonia) | 11–0 | (Andorra) FC Santa Coloma | 7–0 | 4–0 |
| AP Brera Strumica (North Macedonia) | 2–4 | (Bosnia and Herzegovina) Sarajevo | 2–2 | 0–2 |
| Dinamo Minsk (Belarus) | 6–3 | (Armenia) Pyunik | 4–2 | 2–1 |
| Kairat (Kazakhstan) | 6–2 | (Moldova) Academia Rebeja | 2–1 | 4–1 |
| Dinamo Tbilisi (Georgia (country)) | 4–6 | (Montenegro) Budućnost Podgorica | 3–2 | 1–4 |

=== Matches ===
18 September 2024
20:00 (19:00 UTC+1)

| HB (Faroe Islands) | 1–2 | (Luxembourg) Progrès Niederkorn |
|---|---|---|
| Arnfinnsson 47' | Report | Gilgemann 32'; Nigro 83' |

Tórsvøllur, Tórshavn
Attendance: 366
Referee: Pavle Ilić (Serbia)
2 October 2024
19:00

| Progrès Niederkorn (Luxembourg) | 3–0 | (Faroe Islands) HB |
|---|---|---|
| D. Andrade 6'; Gilgemann 35' (pen.); De Rosario 90+1' | Report |

Stade Municipal de la Ville de Differdange, Differdange
Attendance: 1,400
Referee: Jovan Kachevski (North Macedonia)

Progrès Niederkorn won 5–1 on aggregate.

18 September 2024
20:30 (19:30 UTC+1)

| UCD (Republic of Ireland) | 3–0 | (Iceland) Stjarnan |
|---|---|---|
| Brennan 22'; Lawlor 53'; MacLaughlin 75' | Report |

UCD Bowl, Dublin
Attendance: 376
Referee: Lukasz Kuzma (Poland)
2 October 2024
21:00 (19:00 UTC+0)

| Stjarnan (Iceland) | 3–2 | (Republic of Ireland) UCD |
|---|---|---|
| Sigurðsson 7'; Ingason 48'; Benediktsson 71' | Report | MacLaughlin 41'; Parker 90' |

Stjörnuvöllur, Garðabær
Attendance: 175
Referee: Ivana Projkovska (North Macedonia)

UCD won 5–3 on aggregate.

18 September 2024
16:00

| Bylis (Albania) | 1–2 | (Kosovo) 2 Korriku |
|---|---|---|
| Babajide 76' | Report | Ahmeti 82'; Isufi 90+7' |

Elbasan Arena, Elbasan
Attendance: 235
Referee: Eric Wattellier (France)
2 October 2024
14:00

| 2 Korriku (Kosovo) | 2–1 | (Albania) Bylis |
|---|---|---|
| Isufi 61'; Ahmeti 78' | Report | Nwaneri 75' |

Zahir Pajaziti Stadium, Podujevo
Attendance: 700
Referee: Joey Kooij (Netherlands)

2 Korriku won 4–2 on aggregate.

18 September 2024
18:30

| Lincoln Red Imps (Gibraltar) | 0–6 | (Slovenia) Maribor |
|---|---|---|
| | Report | Videnović 12'; Podlesnik 16'; Viher 48'; Meško 72', 89'; Šuligoj 90+2' |

Europa Sports Park, Gibraltar
Attendance: 624
Referee: Edgars Maļcevs (Latvia)
2 October 2024
17:00

| Maribor (Slovenia) | 2–0 | (Gibraltar) Lincoln Red Imps |
|---|---|---|
| Milošević 15'; Roze 50' | Report |

Aluminij Sports Park, Kidričevo
Attendance: 198
Referee: Roman Jitari (Moldova)

Maribor won 8–0 on aggregate.

18 September 2024
18:00 (19:00 UTC+3)

| Žalgiris (Lithuania) | 3–2 | (Wales) The New Saints |
|---|---|---|
| Jansonas 10', 52', 71' | Report | Afful 15', 23' |

LFF Stadium, Vilnius
Attendance: 783
Referee: Rustam Omarov (Kazakhstan)
1 October 2024
20:00 (19:00 UTC+1)

| The New Saints (Wales) | 0–4 | (Lithuania) Žalgiris |
|---|---|---|
| | Report | Matyžonok 38', 40'; Jansonas 48', 66' |

Park Hall, Oswestry
Attendance: 460
Referee: Menelaos Antoniou (Cyprus)

Žalgiris won 7–2 on aggregate.

18 September 2024
17:30 (18:30 UTC+3)

| Honka (Finland) | 1–0 | (Malta) Valletta |
|---|---|---|
| Goshnaw 71' | Report |

Myyrmäki Stadium, Vantaa
Attendance: 275
Referee: Jasmin Sabotic (Luxembourg)
2 October 2024
19:00

| Valletta (Malta) | 3–2 | (Finland) Honka |
|---|---|---|
| Davidyan 52' (o.g.); Ohaka 81'; Azzopardi 90+1' | Report | Backman 24'; Davidyan 79' |
Penalties
| Ewurum (penalty scored); Buhagiar (penalty scored); Mercieca (penalty scored) | 3–0 | (penalty missed) Tukia; (penalty missed) Vadell; (penalty missed) Singh |

Centenary Stadium, Ta' Qali
Attendance: 552
Referee: Miloš Milanović (Serbia)

3–3 on aggregate; Valletta won 3–0 on penalties.

18 September 2024
17:00 (18:00 UTC+3)

| Daugavpils (Latvia) | 1–0 | (Northern Ireland) Cliftonville |
|---|---|---|
| Harzha 38' | Report |

LNK Sporta Parks, Riga
Attendance: 102
Referee: Mihály Káprály (Hungary)
2 October 2024
20:30 (19:30 UTC+1)

| Cliftonville (Northern Ireland) | 2–1 | (Latvia) Daugavpils |
|---|---|---|
| McCart 25'; Reid 90' | Report | Masļakovs 90+8' |
Penalties
| Markey (penalty missed); Reid (penalty missed); McCart (penalty scored); Madden (penalty scored) | 2–4 | (penalty scored) Avdejevs; (penalty scored) Baško; (penalty scored) Daukšts; (penalty scored) Barkovskis |

Solitude, Belfast
Attendance: 730
Referee: Tom Owen (Wales)

2–2 on aggregate; Daugavpils won 4–2 on penalties.

18 September 2024
18:30 (19:30 UTC+3)

| Tallinna Kalev (Estonia) | 7–0 | (Andorra) FC Santa Coloma |
|---|---|---|
| Ilves 21'; Šurõgin 27'; Kajari 30'; Nigula 54', 70'; Jürisoo 76'; Palu 78' | Report |

Kadriorg Stadium, Tallinn
Attendance: 413
Referee: Dalibor Černý (Czech Republic)
2 October 2024
19:30

| FC Santa Coloma (Andorra) | 0–4 | (Estonia) Tallinna Kalev |
|---|---|---|
| | Report | Ilves 39'; Nigula 74'; Šurõgin 83'; Sal-Al-Saller 90+4' (pen.) |

Centre d’Entrenament FAF, Andorra la Vella
Attendance: 180
Referee: Mervan Bejtullahu (Kosovo)

Tallinna Kalev won 11–0 on aggregate.

17 September 2024
15:00

| AP Brera Strumica (North Macedonia) | 2–2 | (Bosnia and Herzegovina) Sarajevo |
|---|---|---|
| Gjorgievski 76', 90+5' (pen.) | Report | Hamzić 37'; Pločo 69' (pen.) |

Stadion Blagoj Istatov, Strumica
Attendance: 600
Referee: Kyriakos Athanasiou (Cyprus)
2 October 2024
18:00

| Sarajevo (Bosnia and Herzegovina) | 2–0 | (North Macedonia) AP Brera Strumica |
|---|---|---|
| Ignatkov 56'; Hamzić 80' | Report |

Koševo City Stadium, Sarajevo
Attendance: 500
Referee: Dmytro Kubriak (Ukraine)

Sarajevo won 4–2 on aggregate.

18 September 2024
18:00 (20:00 UTC+4)

| Dinamo Minsk (Belarus) | 4–2 | (Armenia) Pyunik |
|---|---|---|
| Lutskovich 20'; Zhechko 45'; Sokolovski 54'; Vaskaboinikau 72' | Report | Gevorgyan 65'; Galstyan 90+3' |

Junior Sport Stadium, Yerevan, Armenia (Note: Due to the country's involvement in the Russian invasion of Ukraine, Belarusian teams were required to play their home matches at neutral venues and behind closed doors until further notice.)
Attendance: 0
Referee: Florian Lata (Albania)
22 September 2024
18:00 (20:00 UTC+4)

| Pyunik (Armenia) | 1–2 | (Belarus) Dinamo Minsk |
|---|---|---|
| Hambardzumyan 89' | Report | Dubatouka 23'; Vaskaboinikau 30' |

Junior Sport Stadium, Yerevan
Attendance: 722
Referee: Joakim Östling (Sweden)

Dinamo Minsk won 6–3 on aggregate.

18 September 2024
13:00 (16:00 UTC+5)

| Kairat (Kazakhstan) | 2–1 | (Moldova) Academia Rebeja |
|---|---|---|
| Baibek 35' (pen.); Israilov 87' | Report | Musteață 82' |

Kairat Academy Stadium, Almaty
Attendance: 300
Referee: Georgi Ginchev (Bulgaria)
2 October 2024
14:00 (15:00 UTC+3)

| Academia Rebeja (Moldova) | 1–4 | (Kazakhstan) Kairat |
|---|---|---|
| Mardari 50' (pen.) | Report | Tap 8' (o.g.); Bagdat 42' (pen.); Satpayev 81'; Sautov 90+4' |

Zimbru 2, Chișinău
Attendance: 453
Referee: Matthew MacDermid (Scotland)

Kairat won 6–2 on aggregate.

18 September 2024
17:00 (19:00 UTC+4)

| Dinamo Tbilisi (Georgia (country)) | 3–2 | (Montenegro) Budućnost Podgorica |
|---|---|---|
| Samushia 14'; N. Tsetskhladze 55'; Chikovani 90+1' | Report | Kostić 9'; Tomašević 42' |

Mikheil Meskhi Stadium, Tbilisi
Attendance: 1,000
Referee: Stefan Ebner (Austria)
2 October 2024
19:00

| Budućnost Podgorica (Montenegro) | 4–1 | (Georgia (country)) Dinamo Tbilisi |
|---|---|---|
| Kostić 2', 6', 90+5' (pen.); Camaj 85' | Report | Salia 17' (pen.) |

Podgorica City Stadium, Podgorica
Attendance: 1,500
Referee: Jóhan Hendrik Ellefsen (Faroe Islands)

Budućnost Podgorica won 6–4 on aggregate.

== Second round ==
=== Draw ===
The draw for the second round was held on 3 September 2024, right after the first round draw. There was no seeding. The 40 teams were split into four groups of ten teams. Teams in the same group were drawn against each other, with the order of legs decided by draw.

| Group 1 | Group 2 | Group 3 | Group 4 |
|---|---|---|---|
| (Germany) TSG Hoffenheim; (Netherlands) AZ; (Scotland) Aberdeen; (Norway) Strømsgodset; (Denmark) Midtjylland; (Sweden) IFK Göteborg; (Hungary) Puskás Akadémia; (Luxembourg) Progrès Niederkorn; (Republic of Ireland) UCD; (Kosovo) 2 Korriku | (England) Manchester United; (France) Auxerre; (Belgium) Genk; (Ukraine) Dynamo Kyiv; (Cyprus) Pafos; (Poland) Legia Warsaw; (Bulgaria) CSKA Sofia; (Slovenia) Maribor; (Lithuania) Žalgiris; (Malta) Valletta | (Greece) Olympiacos; (Italy) Sassuolo; (Serbia) IMT; (Switzerland) Basel; (Israel) Maccabi Petah Tikva; (Romania) Farul Constanța; (Azerbaijan) Sabah; (Latvia) Daugavpils; (Estonia) Tallinna Kalev; (Bosnia and Herzegovina) Sarajevo | (Spain) Real Betis; (Portugal) Braga; (Austria) Rapid Wien; (Turkey) Trabzonspor; (Czech Republic) Zbrojovka Brno; (Croatia) Lokomotiva Zagreb; (Slovakia) Trenčín; (Belarus) Dinamo Minsk; (Kazakhstan) Kairat; (Montenegro) Budućnost Podgorica |

Notes

1. ^{†} Winners of the first round, whose identity was not known at the time of draw.

=== Summary ===
The first legs were played on 22, 23 October and 5 November, and the second legs on 27 October, 5, 6 and 9 November 2024.

The winners of the ties advanced to the third round.

Second round
| Team 1 | Agg. | Team 2 | 1st leg | 2nd leg |
|---|---|---|---|---|
| IFK Göteborg (Sweden) | 1–7 | (Germany) TSG Hoffenheim | 0–3 | 1–4 |
| Aberdeen (Scotland) | 1–8 | (Hungary) Puskás Akadémia | 1–5 | 0–3 |
| Strømsgodset (Norway) | 2–8 | (Netherlands) AZ | 1–4 | 1–4 |
| 2 Korriku (Kosovo) | 5–2 | (Republic of Ireland) UCD | 2–1 | 3–1 |
| Progrès Niederkorn (Luxembourg) | 0–9 | (Denmark) Midtjylland | 0–4 | 0–5 |
| Žalgiris (Lithuania) | 2–11 | (England) Manchester United | 2–5 | 0–6 |
| Dynamo Kyiv (Ukraine) | 4–2 | (Slovenia) Maribor | 1–1 | 3–1 |
| Genk (Belgium) | 6–2 | (Bulgaria) CSKA Sofia | 3–1 | 3–1 |
| Legia Warsaw (Poland) | 6–0 | (Cyprus) Pafos | 3–0 | 3–0 |
| Auxerre (France) | 7–0 | (Malta) Valletta | 5–0 | 2–0 |
| Daugavpils (Latvia) | 0–9 | (Italy) Sassuolo | 0–5 | 0–4 |
| Farul Constanța (Romania) | 2–1 | (Serbia) IMT | 2–0 | 0–1 |
| Olympiacos (Greece) | 7–1 | (Estonia) Tallinna Kalev | 5–0 | 2–1 |
| Basel (Switzerland) | 8–1 | (Azerbaijan) Sabah | 6–0 | 2–1 |
| Maccabi Petah Tikva (Israel) | 0–6 | (Bosnia and Herzegovina) Sarajevo | 0–3 (Note: Both legs were cancelled and awarded 3–0 to Sarajevo after Maccabi Petah Tikva withdrew due to security concerns stemming from the Gaza war.) | 0–3 |
| Trabzonspor (Turkey) | 8–3 | (Montenegro) Budućnost Podgorica | 3–1 | 5–2 |
| Braga (Portugal) | 2–3 | (Austria) Rapid Wien | 0–0 | 2–3 |
| Real Betis (Spain) | 11–1 | (Kazakhstan) Kairat | 6–1 | 5–0 |
| Trenčín (Slovakia) | 6–3 | (Czech Republic) Zbrojovka Brno | 3–2 | 3–1 |
| Lokomotiva Zagreb (Croatia) | 2–1 | (Belarus) Dinamo Minsk | 2–1 | 0–0 |

=== Matches ===
23 October 2024
18:00

| IFK Göteborg (Sweden) | 0–3 | (Germany) TSG Hoffenheim |
|---|---|---|
| | Report | Moerstedt 52', 83'; Makanda 58' |

Ullevi, Gothenburg
Attendance: 943
Referee: Cláudio Pereira (Portugal)
6 November 2024
18:00

| TSG Hoffenheim (Germany) | 4–1 | (Sweden) IFK Göteborg |
|---|---|---|
| Tairi 3'; Wähling 43'; Behrens 47'; Čížek 87' | Report | Magnusson 84' |

Dietmar-Hopp-Stadion, Sinsheim
Attendance: 1,050
Referee: Eric Wattellier (France)

TSG Hoffenheim won 7–1 on aggregate.

23 October 2024
20:45 (19:45 UTC+1)

| Aberdeen (Scotland) | 1–5 | (Hungary) Puskás Akadémia |
|---|---|---|
| Mackie 22' | Report | Vékony 16'; Umathum 29'; Mondovics 40', 50', 59' |

Pittodrie Stadium, Aberdeen
Attendance: 2,001
Referee: Lukasz Kuzma (Poland)
6 November 2024
16:00

| Puskás Akadémia (Hungary) | 3–0 | (Scotland) Aberdeen |
|---|---|---|
| Tyshchuk 25'; Miskolczi 53'; Magyarics 87' | Report |

Pancho Aréna, Felcsút
Attendance: 466
Referee: Alessandro Dudic (Switzerland)

Puskás Akadémia won 8–1 on aggregate.

23 October 2024
19:00

| Strømsgodset (Norway) | 1–4 | (Netherlands) AZ |
|---|---|---|
| Haldorsen 63' | Report | Hartog 18', 51'; Mastoras 57' (pen.); Bouziane 88' |

Marienlyst Stadion, Drammen
Attendance: 860
Referee: Roman Jitari (Moldova)
6 November 2024
18:00

| AZ (Netherlands) | 4–1 | (Norway) Strømsgodset |
|---|---|---|
| Van den Ban 11'; Hartog 31'; Zwart 33'; Oerip 38' | Report | Sesay 82' |

AZ Training Centre, Wijdewormer
Attendance: 475
Referee: David Dickinson (Scotland)

AZ won 8–2 on aggregate.

23 October 2024
18:00

| 2 Korriku (Kosovo) | 2–1 | (Republic of Ireland) UCD |
|---|---|---|
| Berisha 42', 59' | Report | Lawlor 30' |

Fadil Vokrri Stadium, Pristina
Attendance: 2,080
Referee: Stefan Ebner (Austria)
6 November 2024
20:00 (19:00 UTC+0)

| UCD (Republic of Ireland) | 1–3 | (Kosovo) 2 Korriku |
|---|---|---|
| Ryan 49' | Report | Ahmeti 13', 64'; Shala 75' |

UCD Bowl, Dublin
Attendance: 463
Referee: Andreas Argyrou (Cyprus)

2 Korriku won 5–2 on aggregate.

23 October 2024
19:00

| Progrès Niederkorn (Luxembourg) | 0–4 | (Denmark) Midtjylland |
|---|---|---|
| | Report | Tornvig 15'; Johannesen 40'; Pimpong 55'; Arinze 69' |

Stade Jos Haupert, Niederkorn
Attendance: 1,350
Referee: Danilo Nikolić (Serbia)
5 November 2024
19:00

| Midtjylland (Denmark) | 5–0 | (Luxembourg) Progrès Niederkorn |
|---|---|---|
| Catak 4'; Tornvig 29', 64'; Arinze 52'; Emefile 83' | Report |

Ikast Stadion, Ikast
Attendance: 262
Referee: Ante Čulina (Croatia)

Midtjylland won 9–0 on aggregate.

23 October 2024
18:00 (19:00 UTC+3)

| Žalgiris (Lithuania) | 2–5 | (England) Manchester United |
|---|---|---|
| Kondrotas 90'; Jansonas 90+4' | Report | Biancheri 33', 54'; Williams 51', 77'; Scanlon 90+2' |

LFF Stadium, Vilnius
Attendance: 4,247
Referee: Jacob Karlsen (Denmark)
6 November 2024
20:00 (19:00 UTC+0)

| Manchester United (England) | 6–0 | (Lithuania) Žalgiris |
|---|---|---|
| Williams 8'; Fredricson 17'; Wheatley 37'; Missin 57'; Biancheri 76'; Scanlon 90' | Report |

Leigh Sports Village, Leigh
Attendance: 351
Referee: Helgi Mikael Jónasson (Iceland)

Manchester United won 11–2 on aggregate.

23 October 2024
13:00

| Dynamo Kyiv (Ukraine) | 1–1 | (Slovenia) Maribor |
|---|---|---|
| Peikrishvili 67' | Report | Podlesnik 37' |

Subcarpathian Football Center, Stalowa Wola, Poland (Note: Due to the Russian invasion of Ukraine, Ukrainian teams were required to play their home matches at neutral venues until further notice.)
Attendance: 102
Referee: Peiman Simani (Finland)
6 November 2024
17:00

| Maribor (Slovenia) | 1–3 | (Ukraine) Dynamo Kyiv |
|---|---|---|
| Koren 75' | Report | Redushko 45+1'; Ponomarenko 46', 49' |

Ljudski vrt, Maribor
Attendance: 1,500
Referee: Menelaos Antoniou (Cyprus)

Dynamo Kyiv won 4–2 on aggregate.

22 October 2024
18:00

| Genk (Belgium) | 3–1 | (Bulgaria) CSKA Sofia |
|---|---|---|
| Toure 33'; Camara 81'; Decresson 88' (pen.) | Report | Panayotov 3' |

Cegeka Arena - Stadium B, Genk
Attendance: 435
Referee: Igor Stojchevski (North Macedonia)
6 November 2024
15:00 (16:00 UTC+2)

| CSKA Sofia (Bulgaria) | 1–3 | (Belgium) Genk |
|---|---|---|
| Nikolov 59' (pen.) | Report | Haroun 21'; De Wannemacker 42'; Evtov 50' (o.g.) |

Vasil Levski National Stadium, Sofia
Attendance: 603
Referee: Bulat Sariyev (Kazakhstan)

Genk won 6–2 on aggregate.

23 October 2024
12:00

| Legia Warsaw (Poland) | 3–0 | (Cyprus) Pafos |
|---|---|---|
| Jędrasik 29'; Karolak 53'; Żewłakow 67' | Report |

Legia Training Center, Książenice
Attendance: 300
Referee: Dmytro Panchyshyn (Ukraine)
6 November 2024
15:00 (16:00 UTC+2)

| Pafos (Cyprus) | 0–3 | (Poland) Legia Warsaw |
|---|---|---|
| | Report | Šarudi 35', 51'; Zbróg 39' |

Stelios Kyriakides Stadium, Paphos
Attendance: 256
Referee: Olatz Rivera Olmedo (Spain)

Legia Warsaw won 6–0 on aggregate.

23 October 2024
19:00

| Auxerre (France) | 5–0 | (Malta) Valletta |
|---|---|---|
| Legros 24', 61'; Seha 34'; Balzanet 37', 75' (pen.) | Report |

Stade de l'Abbé-Deschamps, Auxerre
Attendance: 2,131
Referee: Christos Vergetis (Greece)
6 November 2024
18:00

| Valletta (Malta) | 0–2 | (France) Auxerre |
|---|---|---|
| | Report | Viadere 27'; Rodin 61' |

Centenary Stadium, Ta' Qali
Attendance: 326
Referee: Dominik Starý (Czech Republic)

Auxerre won 7–0 on aggregate.

23 October 2024
12:00 (13:00 UTC+3)

| Daugavpils (Latvia) | 0–5 | (Italy) Sassuolo |
|---|---|---|
| | Report | Frangella 35'; Benvenuti 40'; Urujevs 56' (o.g.); Bruno 86', 90' |

LNK Sporta Parks, Riga
Attendance: 152
Referee: Jasmin Sabotic (Luxembourg)
6 November 2024
19:00

| Sassuolo (Italy) | 4–0 | (Latvia) Daugavpils |
|---|---|---|
| Frangella 1'; Negri 14'; Daldum 50', 71' | Report |

Stadio Enzo Ricci, Sassuolo
Attendance: 270
Referee: Christos Vergetis (Greece)

Sassuolo won 9–0 on aggregate.

23 October 2024
14:00 (15:00 UTC+3)

| Farul Constanța (Romania) | 2–0 | (Serbia) IMT |
|---|---|---|
| Băsceanu 12'; Marchidan 30' | Report |

Central Stadium Hagi Academy, Ovidiu
Attendance: 450
Referee: Ante Čulina (Croatia)
6 November 2024
13:00

| IMT (Serbia) | 1–0 | (Romania) Farul Constanța |
|---|---|---|
| Jović 60' | Report |

Lagator Stadium, Loznica
Attendance: 300
Referee: Marek Radina (Czech Republic)

Farul Constanța won 2–1 on aggregate.

23 October 2024
16:00 (17:00 UTC+3)

| Olympiacos (Greece) | 5–0 | (Estonia) Tallinna Kalev |
|---|---|---|
| Yusuf 36', 85'; Toufakis 42'; Panagakos 48'; Papakanellos 56' | Report |

Renti Training Centre, Piraeus
Attendance: 1,150
Referee: Marc Nagtegaal (Netherlands)
6 November 2024
18:00 (19:00 UTC+2)

| Tallinna Kalev (Estonia) | 1–2 | (Greece) Olympiacos |
|---|---|---|
| Kajari 47' | Report | Pnevmonidis 21'; Liatsikouras 34' |

Kadriorg Stadium, Tallinn
Attendance: 130
Referee: Gustavo Correia (Portugal)

Olympiacos won 7–1 on aggregate.

23 October 2024
19:00

| Basel (Switzerland) | 6–0 | (Azerbaijan) Sabah |
|---|---|---|
| Akalé 6', 16'; Streit 39', 56'; Sow García 77' (pen.); Kuentz 90' | Report |

St. Jakob-Park, Basel
Attendance: 2,692
Referee: Patrik Kolarić (Croatia)
6 November 2024
15:00 (18:00 UTC+4)

| Sabah (Azerbaijan) | 1–2 | (Switzerland) Basel |
|---|---|---|
| Huseynov 89' | Report | Jordan 37'; Rexhaj 85' |

Bayil Arena, Baku
Attendance: 124
Referee: Rustam Omarov (Kazakhstan)

Basel won 8–1 on aggregate.

5 November 2024
15:00

| Maccabi Petah Tikva (Israel) | 0–3 Awarded (Note: Maccabi Petah Tikva withdrew due to security concerns stemming from the Gaza war. Therefore, UEFA awarded both legs as a 3–0 win to Sarajevo.) | (Bosnia and Herzegovina) Sarajevo |
|---|---|---|
| | Report |

Koševo City Stadium, Sarajevo, Bosnia and Herzegovina (Note: Due to the Gaza war, Israeli teams were required to play their home matches at neutral venues until further notice.)
Referee: Oliver Reitala (Finland)
9 November 2024
15:00

| Sarajevo (Bosnia and Herzegovina) | 3–0 Awarded | (Israel) Maccabi Petah Tikva |
|---|---|---|
| | Report |

Koševo City Stadium, Sarajevo
Referee: Luca Cibelli (Switzerland)

Sarajevo won 6–0 on aggregate.

23 October 2024
18:00 (19:00 UTC+3)

| Trabzonspor (Turkey) | 3–1 | (Montenegro) Budućnost Podgorica |
|---|---|---|
| Çakiroğlu 55'; Yıldırım 75'; Başkan 90+4' | Report | Vukanić 54' |

Şenol Güneş Sports Complex, Trabzon
Attendance: 875
Referee: Mihály Káprály (Hungary)
6 November 2024
17:00

| Budućnost Podgorica (Montenegro) | 2–5 | (Turkey) Trabzonspor |
|---|---|---|
| Vukanić 32', 86' | Report | Turan 45'; Yıldırım 48', 49', 63'; Çakiroğlu 82' |

Podgorica City Stadium, Podgorica
Attendance: 2,115
Referee: Lothar D'hondt (Belgium)

Trabzonspor won 8–3 on aggregate.

22 October 2024
16:00 (15:00 UTC+1)

| Braga (Portugal) | 0–0 | (Austria) Rapid Wien |
|---|---|---|
| | Report |

Cidade Desportiva do SC Braga, Braga
Attendance: 538
Referee: Martin Matoša (Slovenia)
6 November 2024
15:00

| Rapid Wien (Austria) | 3–2 | (Portugal) Braga |
|---|---|---|
| Dursun 42'; Silber 76'; Mankan 81' | Report | Vasconcelos 28' (pen.); Ferreira 72' |

Allianz Stadion, Vienna
Attendance: 970
Referee: Sander van der Eijk (Netherlands)

Rapid Wien won 3–2 on aggregate.

23 October 2024
16:00

| Real Betis (Spain) | 6–1 | (Kazakhstan) Kairat |
|---|---|---|
| Martín 12'; García 25', 66'; Marina 63', 90'; Corralejo 90+2' | Report | Bazarbayev 54' |

Ciudad Deportiva Rafael Gordillo, Seville
Attendance: 400
Referee: Pavle Ilić (Serbia)
6 November 2024
10:00 (14:00 UTC+5)

| Kairat (Kazakhstan) | 0–5 | (Spain) Real Betis |
|---|---|---|
| | Report | Funez 14', 30'; Gonzalez 20'; García 48'; Esteban 68' |

Kairat Academy Stadium, Almaty
Attendance: 300
Referee: Kadir Sağlam (Turkey)

Real Betis won 11–1 on aggregate.

23 October 2024
18:00

| Trenčín (Slovakia) | 3–2 | (Czech Republic) Zbrojovka Brno |
|---|---|---|
| Mikulaj 28' (pen.); Adamkovič 31', 56' | Report | Polášek 49'; Švancara 54' (pen.) |

Štadión Sihoť, Trenčín
Attendance: 1,784
Referee: Zorbay Küçük (Turkey)
6 November 2024
17:00

| Zbrojovka Brno (Czech Republic) | 1–3 | (Slovakia) Trenčín |
|---|---|---|
| Volný 10' | Report | Fiala 14', 53'; Mikulaj 20' (pen.) |

Městský fotbalový stadion Srbská, Brno
Attendance: 3,578
Referee: Viktor Kopiievskyi (Ukraine)

Trenčín won 6–3 on aggregate.

23 October 2024
14:00

| Lokomotiva Zagreb (Croatia) | 2–1 | (Belarus) Dinamo Minsk |
|---|---|---|
| Utrobičić 8'; Đurković 83' | Report | Sokolovski 60' |

Branko Čavlović-Čavlek, Karlovac
Attendance: 120
Referee: Ladislav Szikszay (Czech Republic)
27 October 2024
14:00

| Dinamo Minsk (Belarus) | 0–0 | (Croatia) Lokomotiva Zagreb |
|---|---|---|
| | Report |

Stadion sv. Josipa Radnika, Sesvete, Croatia
Attendance: 0
Referee: Antoine Chiaramonti (Andorra)

Lokomotiva Zagreb won 2–1 on aggregate.

== Third round ==
=== Draw ===
The draw for the third round was held on 3 September 2024, right after the first and second round draw. There was no seeding. The 20 teams were split into two groups of ten teams. Teams in the same group were drawn against each other, with the order of legs decided by draw.

| Group 1 | Group 2 |
|---|---|
| (Germany) TSG Hoffenheim; (Hungary) Puskás Akadémia; (Netherlands) AZ; (Kosovo) 2 Korriku; (Denmark) Midtjylland; (England) Manchester United; (Ukraine) Dynamo Kyiv; (Belgium) Genk; (Poland) Legia Warsaw; (France) Auxerre | (Italy) Sassuolo; (Romania) Farul Constanța; (Greece) Olympiacos; (Switzerland) Basel; (Bosnia and Herzegovina) Sarajevo; (Turkey) Trabzonspor; (Austria) Rapid Wien; (Spain) Real Betis; (Slovakia) Trenčín; (Croatia) Lokomotiva Zagreb |

Notes

1. ^{†} Winners of the second round, whose identity was not known at the time of draw.

=== Summary ===
The first legs were played on 26 and 27 November, and the second legs on 10, 11 and 17 December 2024.

The winners of the ties advanced to the knockout phase.

Third round
| Team 1 | Agg. | Team 2 | 1st leg | 2nd leg |
|---|---|---|---|---|
| Dynamo Kyiv (Ukraine) | 9–1 | (Kosovo) 2 Korriku | 5–0 | 4–1 |
| AZ (Netherlands) | 2–1 | (England) Manchester United | 2–1 | 0–0 |
| Puskás Akadémia (Hungary) | 2–2 (6–5 p) | (Belgium) Genk | 1–0 | 1–2 |
| Auxerre (France) | 1–3 | (Germany) TSG Hoffenheim | 1–2 | 0–1 |
| Legia Warsaw (Poland) | 0–9 | (Denmark) Midtjylland | 0–2 | 0–7 |
| Real Betis (Spain) | 4–2 | (Italy) Sassuolo | 3–1 | 1–1 |
| Farul Constanța (Romania) | 1–6 | (Croatia) Lokomotiva Zagreb | 0–2 | 1–4 |
| Trenčín (Slovakia) | 2–5 | (Greece) Olympiacos | 1–1 | 1–4 |
| Basel (Switzerland) | 1–5 | (Austria) Rapid Wien | 1–2 | 0–3 |
| Sarajevo (Bosnia and Herzegovina) | 3–8 | (Turkey) Trabzonspor | 2–2 | 1–6 |

=== Matches ===
27 November 2024
13:00

| Dynamo Kyiv (Ukraine) | 5–0 | (Kosovo) 2 Korriku |
|---|---|---|
| Osypenko 27'; Ponomarenko 32', 58', 73' (pen.); Andreyko 90+4' | Report |

Subcarpathian Football Center, Stalowa Wola, Poland
Attendance: 70
Referee: Miguel Nogueira (Portugal)
11 December 2024
16:00

| 2 Korriku (Kosovo) | 1–4 | (Ukraine) Dynamo Kyiv |
|---|---|---|
| Shala 59' | Report | Ponomarenko 15', 42'; Redushko 68', 80' |

Fadil Vokrri Stadium, Pristina
Attendance: 200
Referee: Dominik Starý (Czech Republic)

Dynamo Kyiv won 9–1 on aggregate.

26 November 2024
17:00

| AZ (Netherlands) | 2–1 | (England) Manchester United |
|---|---|---|
| Van den Ban 43'; Boogaard 67' | Report | Esajas 19' (o.g.) |

AZ Training Centre, Wijdewormer
Attendance: 2,000
Referee: Mihály Káprály (Hungary)
10 December 2024
20:00 (19:00 UTC+0)

| Manchester United (England) | 0–0 | (Netherlands) AZ |
|---|---|---|
| | Report |

Old Trafford, Manchester
Attendance: 1,989
Referee: Cláudio Pereira (Portugal)

AZ won 2–1 on aggregate.

27 November 2024
16:00

| Puskás Akadémia (Hungary) | 1–0 | (Belgium) Genk |
|---|---|---|
| Mondovics 27' (pen.) | Report |

Pancho Aréna, Felcsút
Attendance: 473
Referee: Kevin O'Sullivan (Republic of Ireland)
17 December 2024
18:00

| Genk (Belgium) | 2–1 | (Hungary) Puskás Akadémia |
|---|---|---|
| De Wannemacker 45', 62' (pen.) | Report | Vékony 72' |
Penalties
| Decresson (penalty scored); Cauwel (penalty scored); Tran (penalty scored); De Wannemacker (penalty scored); Kapers (penalty scored); Rabhi (penalty missed) | 5–6 | (penalty scored) Markgráf; (penalty scored) Dymitriev; (penalty scored) Pál; (penalty scored) Umathum; (penalty scored) Mondovics; (penalty scored) Varga |

Cegeka Arena - Stadium B, Genk
Attendance: 467
Referee: Pavle Ilić (Serbia)

2–2 on aggregate; Puskás Akadémia won 6–5 on penalties.

27 November 2024
19:00

| Auxerre (France) | 1–2 | (Germany) TSG Hoffenheim |
|---|---|---|
| Balzanet 59' (pen.) | Report | Faß 34'; Makanda 44' |

Stade de l'Abbé-Deschamps, Auxerre
Attendance: 1,835
Referee: Mervan Bejtullahu (Kosovo)
11 December 2024
19:00

| TSG Hoffenheim (Germany) | 1–0 | (France) Auxerre |
|---|---|---|
| Wähling 79' | Report |

Dietmar-Hopp-Stadion, Sinsheim
Attendance: 1,102
Referee: Rustam Omarov (Kazakhstan)

TSG Hoffenheim won 3–1 on aggregate.

27 November 2024
12:00

| Legia Warsaw (Poland) | 0–2 | (Denmark) Midtjylland |
|---|---|---|
| | Report | Johannesen 3'; Lodberg 63' |

Legia Training Center, Książenice
Attendance: 200
Referee: Jelena Cvetković (Serbia)
11 December 2024
18:00

| Midtjylland (Denmark) | 7–0 | (Poland) Legia Warsaw |
|---|---|---|
| Hansen 1', 54'; Emefile 14'; Kristiansen 25', 41'; Lodberg 57'; Arinze 60' | Report |

Ikast Stadion, Ikast
Attendance: 372
Referee: Ben Mcmaster (Northern Ireland)

Midtjylland won 9–0 on aggregate.

27 November 2024
16:00

| Real Betis (Spain) | 3–1 | (Italy) Sassuolo |
|---|---|---|
| Esteban 40', 44', 47' | Report | Daldum 63' |

Ciudad Deportiva Luis del Sol, Seville
Attendance: 550
Referee: Matthew MacDermid (Scotland)
11 December 2024
18:00

| Sassuolo (Italy) | 1–1 | (Spain) Real Betis |
|---|---|---|
| Bruno 90+6' (pen.) | Report | Marina 86' |

Stadio Enzo Ricci, Sassuolo
Attendance: 612
Referee: Bastien Dechepy (France)

Real Betis won 4–2 on aggregate.

27 November 2024
13:00 (14:00 UTC+2)

| Farul Constanța (Romania) | 0–2 | (Croatia) Lokomotiva Zagreb |
|---|---|---|
| | Report | Perković 25'; Baždarić 44' |

Central Stadium Hagi Academy, Ovidiu
Attendance: 476
Referee: Kyriakos Athanasiou (Cyprus)
11 December 2024
12:00

| Lokomotiva Zagreb (Croatia) | 4–1 | (Romania) Farul Constanța |
|---|---|---|
| Đurković 19'; Canjuga 25' (pen.), 28'; Perković 80' | Report | Stoian 32' |

Stadion sv. Josipa Radnika, Sesvete
Attendance: 120
Referee: Dmytro Panchyshyn (Ukraine)

Lokomotiva Zagreb won 6–1 on aggregate.

27 November 2024
17:00

| Trenčín (Slovakia) | 1–1 | (Greece) Olympiacos |
|---|---|---|
| Hájovský 36' | Report | Pnevmonidis 55' |

Štadión Sihoť, Trenčín
Attendance: 2,443
Referee: Heini Ziskason Viðoy (Faroe Islands)
11 December 2024
12:00 (13:00 UTC+2)

| Olympiacos (Greece) | 4–1 | (Slovakia) Trenčín |
|---|---|---|
| Pnevmonidis 20', 42'; Yusuf 56'; Alafakis 66' | Report | Sani 25' |

Renti Training Centre, Piraeus
Attendance: 455
Referee: Danilo Nikolić (Serbia)

Olympiacos won 5–2 on aggregate.

26 November 2024
19:00

| Basel (Switzerland) | 1–2 | (Austria) Rapid Wien |
|---|---|---|
| Passavant 40' | Report | Nunoo 21'; Stehrer 80' |

Leichtathletik-Stadion St. Jakob, Basel
Attendance: 2,210
Referee: Ante Čulina (Croatia)
11 December 2024
17:00

| Rapid Wien (Austria) | 3–0 | (Switzerland) Basel |
|---|---|---|
| Mankan 18'; Akahomen 86' (o.g.); Silber 90+2' | Report |

Allianz Stadion, Vienna
Attendance: 1,248
Referee: Ladislav Szikszay (Czech Republic)

Rapid Wien won 5–1 on aggregate.

27 November 2024
15:00

| Sarajevo (Bosnia and Herzegovina) | 2–2 | (Turkey) Trabzonspor |
|---|---|---|
| Pločo 66'; Vrban 68' | Report | Çakiroğlu 2', 24' |

Koševo City Stadium, Sarajevo
Attendance: 360
Referee: Jan Petřík (Czech Republic)
11 December 2024
12:00 (14:00 UTC+3)

| Trabzonspor (Turkey) | 6–1 | (Bosnia and Herzegovina) Sarajevo |
|---|---|---|
| Yıldırım 29', 63'; Duymaz 30', 32'; Başkan 39'; Malkoçoğlu 85' | Report | Pločo 10' |

Şenol Güneş Sports Complex, Trabzon
Attendance: 1,484
Referee: Amine Kourgheli (Belarus)

Trabzonspor won 8–3 on aggregate.
