= Leo Saca =

Moldovan footballer (born 2007)

Personal information
- Full name: Leonard Saca
- Date of birth: 6 January 2007 (age 19)
- Place of birth: Ialoveni, Moldova
- Height: 1.84 m (6 ft 0 in)
- Position: Centre-back

Team information
- Current team: CFR Cluj
- Number: 40

Youth career
- 2013–2016: Zimbru Chișinău
- 2016: Barça Escola
- 2017: Cerdanyola
- 2017–2018: Damm
- 2018–2020: Espanyol
- 2020–2026: Barcelona

Senior career*
Years	Team	Apps	(Gls)
2026	Barcelona B	1	(0)
2026–	CFR Cluj	0	(0)

International career^{‡}
2022	Romania U15	4	(0)
2023–	Moldova U21	13	(0)
2026–	Moldova	1	(0)
- * Club domestic league appearances and goals as of 21 February 2026 ‡ National team caps and goals as of 5 June 2026

Leonard "Leo" Saca (born 6 January 2007) is a Moldovan professional footballer who plays a centre-back for Liga I club CFR Cluj and the Moldova national team.

== Early life ==
Born in Moldova, he moved with his parents to Spain in 2016, when he was 9 years old.

== Club career ==
Saca was part of the Barcelona's youth side that won the 2024–25 UEFA Youth League. He made four appearances and scored against Stade Brestois and Borussia Dortmund in the league phase.

== International career ==
Saca holds dual Moldovan and Romanian citizenship. He has represented Romania at under-15 level, debuted for the Moldova national under-21 football team at the age of 16 during the 2025 UEFA European Under-21 Championship qualification.

== Style of play ==
Saca has been described as "developing as a central defender, but he can also play as a left defender or closing midfielder". He was nicknamed the "Machine" by his teammates.

== Career statistics ==
=== Club ===
As of 21 February 2026

Appearances and goals by club, season and competition
Club	Season	League			National Cup		Europe		Other		Total	
Club	Season	Division	Apps	Goals	Apps	Goals	Apps	Goals	Apps	Goals	Apps	Goals
Barcelona B	2025–26	Segunda Federación	1	0	—		—		—		1	0
CFR Cluj	2026–27	Liga I	0	0	0	0	—		—		0	0
Career total			1	0	0	0	—		—		1	0

=== International ===
As of match played 5 June 2026.

Appearances and goals by national team and year
National team	Year	Apps	Goals
Moldova
Moldova	2026	1	0
Total		1	0

== Honours ==
Barcelona U19

- Copa del Rey Juvenil: 2025
- UEFA Youth League: 2024–25
