= 2023–24 Ukrainian Premier League Under-19 =

Ukrainian Premier League Under-19
- Season: 2023–24
- Champions: Dynamo Kyiv
- Relegated: Mynai; Dnipro-1; Metalist 1925 Kharkiv
- Top goalscorer: Matviy Ponomarenko (24)

The 2023–24 Ukrainian Premier League Under-19 season were competitions between the youth teams of the Ukrainian Premier League.

== Teams ==
Entering	Replaced
Polissya Zhytomyr; LNZ Cherkasy; Obolon Kyiv	FC Lviv; Metalist Kharkiv; Inhulets Petrove

== League table ==
Pos	Team	Pld	W	D	L	GF	GA	GD	Pts	Qualification or relegation
1	Dynamo Kyiv	30	23	4	3	93	23	+70	73	Qualification to Domestic Champions path
2	Shakhtar Donetsk	30	23	2	5	64	30	+34	71	Qualification to UEFA Champions League Path
3	Dnipro-1	30	15	8	7	52	34	+18	53	Withdrew
4	Kolos Kovalivka	30	15	5	10	45	39	+6	50	
5	Polissia Zhytomyr	30	13	10	7	49	36	+13	49	
6	Oleksandriya	30	13	8	9	45	30	+15	47	
7	Kryvbas Kryvyi Rih	30	13	7	10	56	47	+9	46	
8	Rukh Lviv	30	13	4	13	52	46	+6	43 (Note: Head-to-head results: Rukh – Vorskla 3:2; Vorskla – Rukh 3:2)	
9	Vorskla Poltava	30	13	4	13	49	46	+3	43	
10	Zorya Luhansk	30	11	7	12	46	45	+1	40	
11	Veres Rivne	30	9	11	10	39	40	−1	38	
12	Metalist 1925 Kharkiv	30	9	4	17	42	77	−35	31	Relegated
13	Mynai	30	8	4	18	31	49	−18	28	Relegated
14	Chornomorets Odesa	30	6	6	18	27	47	−20	24	
15	Obolon Kyiv	30	4	8	18	29	59	−30	20	
16	LNZ Cherkasy	30	3	6	21	21	92	−71	15	

Source: Ukrainian Premier League website
Rules for classification: 1) Points; 2) Head-to-head points; 3) Head-to-head goal difference; 4) Head-to-head higher number of goals scored; 5) Goal difference; 6) Higher number of goals scored; 7) Draw or "Golden match" if two teams tied for title (Article 22, paragraph 3).

=== Top scorers ===
Scorer	Team	Goals (Pen.)
(Ukraine) Matviy Ponomarenko	Dynamo Kyiv	24 (2)
(Ukraine) Mykhailo Rasko	Polissia Zhytomyr	14 (6)
(Ukraine) Vladyslav Ostrovskyi	Metalist 1925 / Vorskla	13 (0)
(Ukraine) Dmytriy Kremchanin	Dynamo Kyiv	13 (1)
(Ukraine) Dmytro Hodya	Veres Rivne	12 (5)

Source: Ukrainian Premier League website

== See also ==
- 2023–24 Ukrainian Premier League
