= Ranel Young =

English footballer (born 2005)

Personal information
- Full name: Ranel Jerva Young
- Date of birth: 26 December 2005 (age 20)
- Height: 5 ft 9 in (1.75 m)
- Position: Right winger

Team information
- Current team: Bristol City

Youth career
- –2017: Huddersfield Town
- 2017–2025: Liverpool
- 2026–: Bristol City

Senior career*
Years	Team	Apps	(Gls)
2025	Ušće Novi Beograd	5	(0)
2026–	Bristol City	0	(0)
- * Club domestic league appearances and goals as of 11:15, 2 January 2026 (UTC)

Ranel Jerva Young (born 26 December 2005) is an English professional footballer who plays as a right winger for EFL Championship club Bristol City.

== Career ==
He joined the academy at Liverpool as a 12 year-old, having previously been with his hometown club Huddersfield Town. He signed his first professional contract in May 2023. On 30 October 2024, he was included in the first-team substitutes for Liverpool's EFL Cup tie against Brighton and Hove Albion.

Young was offered a new contract by Liverpool at the end of the 2024-25 season. However, on 25 July 2025, Young joined Serbian First League club Ušće.

Ranel signed for Championship club Bristol City on 2 January 2026 on an 18-month contract.

== Style of play ==
He is described as a winger, who is comfortable playing on either flank and possesses good pace.
