= Keyon Ewurum =

Maltese footballer (born 2007)

Personal information
- Full name: Keyon Ewurum Kelechi
- Date of birth: April 20, 2007 (age 19)
- Place of birth: Santa Venera, Malta
- Height: 1.82 m (6 ft 0 in)
- Position: Forward

Team information
- Current team: Valletta
- Number: 80

Youth career
- Valletta

Senior career*
Years	Team	Apps	(Gls)
2023–	Valletta	19	(1)
2026	→ Torino (loan)	0	(0)

International career^{‡}
2022–2024	Malta U16	12	(2)
2022	Malta U17	3	(0)
2024–2025	Malta U18	5	(0)
2024	Malta U19	6	(0)
2024–2025	Malta U21	7	(2)
2025–	Malta	8	(0)
- * Club domestic league appearances and goals as of 23 August 2026 ‡ National team caps and goals as of 20:00, 13 November 2026 (UTC)

Keyon Ewurum Kelechi (born 20 April 2007) is a Maltese footballer who plays as a forward for Valletta and the Malta national team.

== Club career ==
A product of the Valletta academy, Ewurum made his senior debut with Valletta in the Maltese Premier League during the 2023–24 season. He has continued with the first team in the following seasons, featuring in multiple league fixtures for the Citizens. On 1 February 2026, he joined Torino on loan with an option to buy. He only played for the Under-20 squad during his time with Torino, not with the senior squad.

== International career ==
Ewurum received his first senior call-up in June 2025 for Malta's 2026 FIFA World Cup qualification campaign. He made his senior international debut on 8 June 2025 as a late substitute in Malta's 1–1 home draw against Lithuania in World Cup qualifying. UEFA also list him in Malta's senior pool.

== Style of play ==
Valletta describe Ewurum as being known for his "physical presence, pace, and ability to hold up the ball". He is listed as playing as both a centre-forward and an attacking midfielder.

== Personal life ==
Ewurum was born in Santa Venera to a Nigerian father and Maltese mother. In June 2025 Valletta FC publicly condemned racist remarks that targeted Ewurum following news of his first senior call-up, describing the comments as “appalling”.
