= Daniel Cummings =

Scottish footballer (born 2006)

Personal information
- Full name: Daniel Cummings
- Date of birth: 14 April 2006 (age 20)
- Place of birth: Glasgow, Scotland
- Height: 6 ft 1 in (1.85 m)
- Position: Forward

Team information
- Current team: Aldershot Town (on loan from West Ham United)

Youth career
- Celtic

Senior career*
Years	Team	Apps	(Gls)
2022–2025	Celtic B	57	(38)
2025	Celtic	0	(0)
2025–	West Ham United	0	(0)
2026–	→ Aldershot Town (loan)	0	(0)

International career^{‡}
2023	Scotland U17	3	(1)
2024	Scotland U19	3	(0)
- * Club domestic league appearances and goals as of 12:33, 13 November 2026 (UTC) ‡ National team caps and goals as of 23 November 2024

Daniel Cummings (born 14 April 2006) is a Scottish professional footballer who plays as a forward for Aldershot Town, on loan from EFL Championship club West Ham United.

== Club career ==
=== Celtic ===
Glasgow born, Cummings is a youth product of Celtic, where he first was a standout in the youth teams.

During the 2022–23 season he made his breakthrough in the Lowland League Celtic B team, where he established himself as a prolific goalscorer the following season. In May 2023, he scored the decider in a 6–5 win against Rangers in the Scottish Youth Cup final.

He started the 2024–25 season averaging more than a goal per game with the B team and also standing in the Youth League, as he scored a brace to open the score against Slovan Bratislava, helping his team to a 4–0 opening win in the competition.

On 29 January 2025, Cummings made his competitive debut for Celtic in the UEFA Champions League against Aston Villa when he came on as 79th minute substitute for Adam Idah.

=== West Ham United ===
On 1 July 2025, Premier League club West Ham United announced the signing of Cummings on a long–term deal.

On 13 November 2026, Cummings joined National League club Aldershot Town on a one-month loan deal.

== International career ==
Cummings is a youth international for Scotland, having played for the under-17 team in 2023, as he helped them qualify for the 2023 European Championship.
