= Mahamadou Sangaré =

Footballer (born 2007)

Personal information
- Date of birth: 6 March 2007 (age 19)
- Place of birth: Dionkoulané, Kayes Region, Mali
- Height: 5 ft 10 in (1.78 m)
- Position: Forward

Team information
- Current team: Al-Qadsiah
- Number: 30

Youth career
- 2022: Racing Club de France
- 2022–2023: Montrouge FC 92
- 2023–2025: Paris Saint-Germain
- 2025–2026: Manchester City

Senior career*
Years	Team	Apps	(Gls)
2026–	Al-Qadsiah	1	(1)

International career^{‡}
2024–	France U18	2	(0)
- * Club domestic league appearances and goals as of 29 October 2026 ‡ National team caps and goals as of 21:19, 16 June 2025 (UTC)

Mahamadou Sangaré (born 6 March 2007) is a footballer who plays as a forward for Saudi Pro League club Al-Qadsiah. Born in Mali, he represents France at youth international level.

== Club career ==
Sangaré was born in Dionkoulané in the Kayes Region and grew up in Bamako. Him and his father moved to Cergy where he was given a trial with French club Racing Club de France. In 2022, Sangaré joined Montrouge FC 92, playing for their under-17 side despite being 15. He signed a youth contract with Paris Saint-Germain in 2023. At the end of the 2024–25 UEFA Youth League, he finished as the joint-top scorer with eight goals. In his two seasons at Paris Saint-Germain, he scored 42 goals in 46 games for the club's under-19s.

Sangaré signed a five-year professional contract with Premier League club Manchester City on 13 June 2025.

On 6 September 2026, Sangaré joined Saudi Pro League side Al-Qadsiah, signing a three-year contract.

== International career ==
Sangaré made his debut for the France under-18s in two friendly games against Tunisia and the Netherlands in November 2024.

== Honours ==
Paris Saint-Germain U19

- Championnat National U19: 2023–24, 2024–25

Individual

- UEFA Youth League top scorer: 2024–25 (joint)
