= Robin van Duiven =

Dutch footballer (born 2006)

Personal information
- Date of birth: 8 April 2006 (age 20)
- Place of birth: Netherlands
- Height: 1.77 m (5 ft 10 in)
- Positions: Midfielder; forward

Team information
- Current team: Valladolid

Youth career
- –2018: FC Twente
- 2018–2025: PSV

Senior career*
Years	Team	Apps	(Gls)
2023–2026	Jong PSV	25	(15)
2025–2026	PSV	0	(0)
2026	→ Lommel (loan)	8	(2)
2026–	Valladolid	0	(0)

International career^{‡}
2023	Netherlands U17	2	(0)
- * Club domestic league appearances and goals as of 20 April 2026 ‡ National team caps and goals as of 24 May 2023

Robin van Duiven (born 8 April 2006) is a Dutch professional footballer who plays as a midfielder or forward for Segunda División club Real Valladolid.

== Early life ==
Van Duiven was born on 8 April 2006. Born in the Netherlands, he is the younger brother of Dutch footballer Jason van Duiven.

== Club career ==
As a youth player, van Duiven joined the youth academy of FC Twente. Following his stint there, he joined the youth academy of PSV ahead of the 2018–19 season and was promoted to the club's senior team in 2025.

On 2 February 2026, he signed for Challenger Pro League club Lommel, on a season long loan. On 5 July, he signed a three-year contract with Real Valladolid in the Spanish Segunda División.

== International career ==
Van Duiven is a Netherlands youth international. During May 2023, he played for the Netherlands national under-17 football team at the 2023 UEFA European Under-17 Championship.
