= Arnau Pradas =

Spanish footballer (born 2006)

Personal information
- Full name: Arnau Pradas Algaba
- Date of birth: 24 March 2006 (age 20)
- Place of birth: Manresa, Spain
- Height: 1.80 m (5 ft 11 in)
- Position: Winger

Team information
- Current team: Al Wahda
- Number: 38

Youth career
- –2013: Gimnàstic Manresa
- 2013–2025: Barcelona

Senior career*
Years	Team	Apps	(Gls)
2024	Barcelona B	2	(0)
2025–	Al Wahda	2	(1)

International career^{‡}
2022	Spain U16	7	(0)
- * Club domestic league appearances and goals ‡ National team caps and goals as of 2 June 2022

Arnau Pradas Algaba (born 24 March 2006) is a Spanish professional footballer who plays as a winger for Al Wahda.

== Early life ==
Pradas was born in Manresa, Barcelona, Catalonia.

== Club career ==
As a youth player, Pradas joined the youth academy of Spanish side Gimnàstic Manresa. Following his stint there, he joined the youth academy of Spanish La Liga side Barcelona during the summer of 2013 and was promoted to the club's reserve team in 2024. Spanish news website Relevo wrote in 2022 that "two seasons ago, Pradas was arguably the most outstanding player in all of Barça's youth system" while playing for them. Ahead of the 2025–26 season, he signed for Emirati side Al Wahda.

== International career ==
Pradas is a Spain youth international. On 15 February 2022, he debuted for the Spain national under-16 football team during a 3–0 home friendly win over the Switzerland national under-16 football team.

== Style of play ==
Pradas plays as a winger. Left-footed, he is known for his dribbling ability and has received comparisons to Brazil international Garrincha.
