= Omar Janneh =

Spanish footballer (born 2006)

Personal information
- Full name: Omar Janneh Susso
- Date of birth: 23 August 2006 (age 20)
- Place of birth: Lleida, Spain
- Height: 1.88 m (6 ft 2 in)
- Position: Forward

Team information
- Current team: Lausanne-Sport
- Number: 78

Youth career
- Atlètic Segre
- 2018–2021: Espanyol
- 2021–2022: Granada
- 2022–2024: Atlético Madrid

Senior career*
Years	Team	Apps	(Gls)
2024–2026	Atlético Madrid B	44	(11)
2026–	Lausanne-Sport	27	(9)

International career^{‡}
2022	Spain U17	1	(0)
2024	Spain U18	2	(2)
2024–	Spain U19	15	(4)
Medal record
Men's football
Representing Spain
UEFA European Under-19 Championship
Runner-up	2025 Romania
- * Club domestic league appearances and goals as of 28 September 2026 ‡ National team caps and goals as of 26 June 2025

Omar Janneh Susso (born 23 August 2006) is a Spanish professional footballer who plays as a forward for Swiss Super League club Lausanne-Sport.

== Career ==
As a youth player, Janneh joined the academy of La Liga side Atlético Madrid. He was regarded as one of the club's most important players.

On 10 January 2026, Janneh joined Swiss Super League club Lausanne-Sport on a contract until 30 June 2030, for a reported fee of €2 million.

== Style of play ==
Janneh mainly operates as a striker. He has been described as a "powerful, ambidextrous forward, with a great stride and who continually attacks spaces".

== Personal life ==
Janneh is a native of Lleida, Spain. He is of Gambian descent.

== Honours ==
Spain U19

- UEFA European Under-19 Championship runner-up: 2025
