= Poyraz Efe Yıldırım =

Turkish association football player

Personal information
- Full name: Engin Poyraz Efe Yıldırım
- Date of birth: 15 January 2005 (age 21)
- Place of birth: Borçka, Turkey
- Height: 1.88 m (6 ft 2 in)
- Position: Forward

Team information
- Current team: Muğlaspor (on loan from Trabzonspor)
- Number: 9

Youth career
- 2017–2018: Artvin Ormanspor
- 2018–2019: Çaykur Rizespor
- 2019–2023: Trabzonspor

Senior career*
Years	Team	Apps	(Gls)
2023–	Trabzonspor	9	(1)
2025	→ Ümraniyespor (loan)	15	(3)
2025–2026	→ Antalyaspor (loan)	10	(0)
2026	→ Sakaryaspor (loan)	16	(3)
2026–	→ Muğlaspor (loan)	11	(0)

International career^{‡}
2019	Turkey U15	2	(0)
2022	Turkey U17	4	(1)
2023	Turkey U19	18	(6)
2024	Turkey U20	2	(1)
2024–	Turkey U21	10	(1)
- * Club domestic league appearances and goals as of 19 October 2026 ‡ National team caps and goals as of 3 June 2026

Engin Poyraz Efe Yıldırım (born 15 January 2005) is a Turkish footballer who plays as a forward for TFF 1. Lig club Muğlaspor on loan from Trabzonspor.

== Early life ==
Yıldırım's mother was a nurse and his father was an election director at the Istanbul Justice Palace. His first name "Engin" comes from his father, and his second middle name "Efe" includes the initials of his parents and himself. From the ages of 4 to 11 he primarily played tennis, before opting to play football.

== Professional career ==
Yıldırım is a youth product of Artvin Ormanspor, Çaykur Rizespor, and Trabzonspor. On 6 April 2023, he signed his first professional contract with Trabzonspor for 2.5 seasons. He made his senior and professional debut with Trabzonspor as a late substitute in a 3–1 Süper Lig loss to İstanbul Başakşehir on 6 June 2023. In the 2023–24 season, he was the top scorer in the U19 league in Turkey with 20 goals in 2022 matches and helped the Trabzonspor U19s win the league. On 12 April 2024, he extended his contract with Trabzonspor until 2028.

== International career ==
Yıldırım is a youth international for Turkey, having played up to the Turkey U19s. He was called up to the Turkey U20s in September 2024.
