= 2024–25 Arsenal W.F.C. season =

English women's football club season

Arsenal Women
2024–25 season
- Owner: Kroenke Sports & Entertainment
- Manager: Jonas Eidevall (until 15 October); Renée Slegers (from 15 October)
- Stadium: Emirates Stadium; Meadow Park (Select home games)
- Super League: 2nd
- FA Cup: Quarter-finals
- League Cup: Semi-finals
- Champions League: Winners
- Top goalscorer: League: Alessia Russo (12); All: Alessia Russo (20)
- Highest home attendance: 56,784 (vs Tottenham Hotspur, 16 February 2025) at Emirates Stadium
- Lowest home attendance: 2,828 (vs BK Häcken, Champions League, 26 September 2024) at Meadow Park
- Average home league attendance: 28,808
- Biggest win: 6–0 (vs Rangers (H), Champions League, 4 September 2024)
- Biggest defeat: 2–5 (vs Bayern Munich (A), Champions League, 12 October 2024); 2–5 (vs Aston Villa (A), WSL, 30 April 2025)
| Home colours | Away colours | Third colours |
- All statistics correct as of 24 May 2025.

The 2024–25 season was Arsenal Women's Football Club's 38th season of competitive football. The club participated in the Women's Super League, the FA Cup, the League Cup and the Champions League, winning the latter for the second time in their history after defeating Barcelona in the final on 24 May 2025.

On 14 May 2024, the club announced that Emirates Stadium will become Arsenal Women’s main home with plans to play a minimum of eight league matches at the stadium, and depending on competition progression, three Champions League matches. Meadow Park will continue to host the remaining fixtures, including all domestic cup home matches.

Head coach Jonas Eidevall departed the club on 15 October 2024, with Renée Slegers assuming the role on an interim basis. On 17 January 2025, Slegers was announced as the permanent head coach.

== Squad information & statistics ==
=== First team squad ===
| No. | Name | Date of birth (age) | Since | Last Contract | Signed from |
Goalkeepers
| 1 | (Austria) Manuela Zinsberger | 19 October 1995 (age 31) | 2019 | January 2024 | (Germany) Bayern Munich |
| 14 | (Netherlands) Daphne van Domselaar | 6 March 2000 (age 26) | 2024 | July 2024 | (England) Aston Villa |
| 40 | (England) Naomi Williams | 24 October 2004 (age 22) | 2023 | June 2023 | (England) Arsenal Academy |
Defenders
| 2 | (United States) Emily Fox | 5 July 1998 (age 28) | 2024 | January 2024 | (United States) North Carolina Courage |
| 3 | (England) Lotte Wubben-Moy | 11 January 1999 (age 27) | 2020 | April 2025 | (United States) University of North Carolina |
| 5 | (Spain) Laia Codina | 22 January 2000 (age 26) | 2023 | August 2023 | (Spain) Barcelona |
| 6 | (England) Leah Williamson | 29 March 1997 (age 29) | 2014 | May 2024 | (England) Arsenal Academy |
| 7 | (Australia) Steph Catley | 26 January 1994 (age 32) | 2020 | June 2023 | (Australia) Melbourne City |
| 11 | (Republic of Ireland) Katie McCabe | 21 September 1995 (age 31) | 2015 | September 2023 | (Republic of Ireland) Shelbourne |
| 22 | (United States) Jenna Nighswonger | 28 November 2000 (age 25) | 2025 | January 2025 | (United States) NJ/NY Gotham FC |
| 26 | (Austria) Laura Wienroither | 13 January 1999 (age 27) | 2022 | June 2024 | (Germany) TSG Hoffenheim |
| 28 | (Sweden) Amanda Ilestedt | 17 January 1993 (age 33) | 2023 | June 2023 | (France) Paris Saint-Germain |
| 29 | (England) Teyah Goldie | 27 June 2004 (age 22) | 2021 | June 2022 | (England) Arsenal Academy |
| 62 | (England) Katie Reid | 25 September 2006 (age 20) | 2024 | October 2024 | (England) Arsenal Academy |
Midfielders
| 10 | (Scotland) Kim Little (c) | 29 June 1990 (age 36) | 2016 | April 2023 | (United States) Seattle Reign |
| 12 | (Norway) Frida Maanum | 16 July 1999 (age 27) | 2021 | May 2025 | (Sweden) Linköpings FC |
| 13 | (Switzerland) Lia Wälti | 19 April 1993 (age 33) | 2018 | May 2023 | (Germany) Turbine Potsdam |
| 21 | (Netherlands) Victoria Pelova | 3 June 1999 (age 27) | 2023 | January 2023 | (Netherlands) Ajax |
| 32 | (Australia) Kyra Cooney-Cross | 15 February 2002 (age 24) | 2023 | September 2023 | (Sweden) Hammarby IF |
| 56 | (England) Freya Godfrey | 7 May 2005 (age 21) | 2023 | June 2023 | (England) Arsenal Academy |
| 60 | (England) Laila Harbert | 3 January 2007 (age 19) | 2025 | January 2025 | (England) Arsenal Academy |
| 61 | (England) Madison Earl | 3 November 2006 (age 20) | 2025 | January 2025 | (England) Arsenal Academy |
Forwards
| 8 | (Spain) Mariona Caldentey | 19 March 1996 (age 30) | 2024 | July 2024 | (Spain) Barcelona |
| 9 | (England) Beth Mead | 9 May 1995 (age 31) | 2017 | December 2022 | (England) Sunderland |
| 16 | (Sweden) Rosa Kafaji | 5 July 2003 (age 23) | 2024 | August 2024 | (Sweden) BK Häcken |
| 17 | (Sweden) Lina Hurtig | 5 September 1995 (age 31) | 2022 | August 2022 | (Italy) Juventus |
| 18 | (England) Chloe Kelly | 15 January 1998 (age 28) | 2025 | January 2025 | (England) Manchester City (loan) |
| 19 | (Australia) Caitlin Foord | 11 November 1994 (age 31) | 2020 | June 2023 | (Australia) Sydney FC |
| 23 | (England) Alessia Russo | 8 February 1999 (age 27) | 2023 | July 2023 | (England) Manchester United |
| 25 | (Sweden) Stina Blackstenius | 5 February 1996 (age 30) | 2022 | May 2024 | (Sweden) BK Häcken |
| 52 | (England) Vivienne Lia | 27 September 2006 (age 20) | 2025 | January 2025 | (England) Arsenal Academy |
| 59 | (England) Michelle Agyemang | 3 February 2006 (age 20) | 2024 | May 2024 | (England) Arsenal Academy |

=== Statistics ===
Statistics as of 24 May 2025

==== Appearances and goals ====
| No. | Name | Super League | | FA Cup | | League Cup | | UWCL | | Total | |
| No. | Name | Apps | Goals | Apps | Goals | Apps | Goals | Apps | Goals | Apps | Goals |
Goalkeepers
| 1 | (Austria) Manuela Zinsberger | 7 | 0 | 2 | 0 | 1 | 0 | 8 | 0 | 18 | 0 |
| 14 | (Netherlands) Daphne van Domselaar | 15 | 0 | 1 | 0 | 1 | 0 | 7 | 0 | 24 | 0 |
| 40 | (England) Naomi Williams | 0 | 0 | 0 | 0 | 0 | 0 | 0 | 0 | 0 | 0 |
Defenders
| 2 | (United States) Emily Fox | 21 | 1 | 1+2 | 0 | 1+1 | 0 | 14 | 1 | 37+3 | 2 |
| 3 | (England) Lotte Wubben-Moy | 6+5 | 1 | 2 | 0 | 2 | 0 | 3+3 | 0 | 13+8 | 1 |
| 5 | (Spain) Laia Codina | 4+3 | 0 | 2 | 1 | 1 | 0 | 7+1 | 1 | 14+4 | 2 |
| 6 | (England) Leah Williamson | 17+2 | 2 | 1+1 | 0 | 1+1 | 0 | 12+1 | 0 | 31+5 | 2 |
| 7 | (Australia) Steph Catley | 18+1 | 0 | 2 | 0 | 1 | 0 | 8+2 | 0 | 29+3 | 0 |
| 11 | (Republic of Ireland) Katie McCabe | 20 | 1 | 2 | 0 | 1+1 | 1 | 15 | 0 | 38+1 | 2 |
| 22 (Note: Kathrine Møller Kühl wore the number 22 shirt until her departure on 18 January 2025. Jenna Nighswonger took the number upon her signing for the club on 30 January.) | (United States) Jenna Nighswonger | 1+3 | 0 | 1 | 0 | 0 | 0 | 0 | 0 | 2+3 | 0 |
| 26 | (Austria) Laura Wienroither | 0+1 | 0 | 0 | 0 | 0 | 0 | 0+4 | 0 | 0+5 | 0 |
| 28 | (Sweden) Amanda Ilestedt | 0+3 | 0 | 0+3 | 0 | 0 | 0 | 0 | 0 | 0+6 | 0 |
| 29 | (England) Teyah Goldie | 0 | 0 | 0 | 0 | 0 | 0 | 0 | 0 | 0 | 0 |
| 62 | (England) Katie Reid | 1+6 | 0 | 2 | 0 | 1 | 0 | 1+2 | 0 | 5+8 | 0 |
Midfielders
| 10 | (Scotland) Kim Little (c) | 15+5 | 1 | 1 | 0 | 0+1 | 0 | 14 | 1 | 30+6 | 2 |
| 12 | (Norway) Frida Maanum | 19+3 | 7 | 2+1 | 1 | 2 | 1 | 10+5 | 4 | 33+9 | 13 |
| 13 | (Switzerland) Lia Wälti | 10+8 | 0 | 0+3 | 0 | 2 | 0 | 5+5 | 1 | 17+16 | 1 |
| 21 | (Netherlands) Victoria Pelova | 1+4 | 1 | 0 | 0 | 0 | 0 | 0+1 | 0 | 1+5 | 1 |
| 22 | (Denmark) Kathrine Møller Kühl | 0+1 | 0 | 0 | 0 | 0 | 0 | 0+2 | 0 | 0+3 | 0 |
| 32 | (Australia) Kyra Cooney-Cross | 10+9 | 0 | 3 | 0 | 2 | 1 | 6+4 | 0 | 21+13 | 1 |
| 56 | (England) Freya Godfrey | 0 | 0 | 0 | 0 | 0 | 0 | 0+1 | 0 | 0+1 | 0 |
Forwards
| 8 | (Spain) Mariona Caldentey | 20+1 | 9 | 3 | 0 | 1+1 | 2 | 14+1 | 8 | 38+3 | 19 |
| 9 | (England) Beth Mead | 13+8 | 7 | 2 | 2 | 1 | 0 | 6+7 | 1 | 22+15 | 10 |
| 16 | (Sweden) Rosa Kafaji | 0+10 | 1 | 1 | 0 | 1 | 0 | 1+6 | 0 | 3+16 | 1 |
| 17 | (Sweden) Lina Hurtig | 0+5 | 1 | 0 | 0 | 0 | 0 | 0+7 | 1 | 0+12 | 2 |
| 18 | (England) Chloe Kelly | 6+2 | 2 | 0 | 0 | 0 | 0 | 3+2 | 0 | 9+4 | 2 |
| 19 | (Australia) Caitlin Foord | 15+5 | 6 | 2 | 0 | 0+1 | 0 | 12+3 | 7 | 29+9 | 13 |
| 23 | (England) Alessia Russo | 19+2 | 12 | 2+1 | 0 | 2 | 0 | 14+1 | 8 | 37+4 | 20 |
| 25 | (Sweden) Stina Blackstenius | 4+15 | 5 | 1+2 | 3 | 1+1 | 0 | 5+10 | 2 | 11+28 | 10 |
| 53 | (England) Vivienne Lia | 0 | 0 | 0 | 0 | 0 | 0 | 0 | 0 | 0 | 0 |
| 59 | (England) Michelle Agyemang | 0 | 0 | 0 | 0 | 0 | 0 | 0 | 0 | 0 | 0 |

==== Goalscorers ====
| Rank | No. | Position | Name | Super League | FA Cup | League Cup | UWCL | Total |
|---|---|---|---|---|---|---|---|---|
| 1 | 23 | FW | (England) Alessia Russo | 12 | 0 | 0 | 8 | 20 |
| 2 | 8 | FW | (Spain) Mariona Caldentey | 9 | 0 | 2 | 8 | 19 |
| 3 | 12 | MF | (Norway) Frida Maanum | 7 | 1 | 1 | 4 | 13 |
| 3 | 19 | FW | (Australia) Caitlin Foord | 6 | 0 | 0 | 7 | 13 |
| 5 | 9 | FW | (England) Beth Mead | 7 | 2 | 0 | 1 | 10 |
| 5 | 25 | FW | (Sweden) Stina Blackstenius | 5 | 3 | 0 | 2 | 10 |
| 7 | 2 | DF | (United States) Emily Fox | 1 | 0 | 0 | 1 | 2 |
| 7 | 5 | DF | (Spain) Laia Codina | 0 | 1 | 0 | 1 | 2 |
| 7 | 6 | DF | (England) Leah Williamson | 2 | 0 | 0 | 0 | 2 |
| 7 | 10 | MF | (Scotland) Kim Little | 1 | 0 | 0 | 1 | 2 |
| 7 | 11 | DF | (Republic of Ireland) Katie McCabe | 1 | 0 | 1 | 0 | 2 |
| 7 | 17 | FW | (Sweden) Lina Hurtig | 1 | 0 | 0 | 1 | 2 |
| 7 | 18 | FW | (England) Chloe Kelly | 2 | 0 | 0 | 0 | 2 |
| 14 | 3 | DF | (England) Lotte Wubben-Moy | 1 | 0 | 0 | 0 | 1 |
| 14 | 13 | MF | (Switzerland) Lia Wälti | 0 | 0 | 0 | 1 | 1 |
| 14 | 16 | FW | (Sweden) Rosa Kafaji | 1 | 0 | 0 | 0 | 1 |
| 14 | 21 | MF | (Netherlands) Victoria Pelova | 1 | 0 | 0 | 0 | 1 |
| 14 | 32 | MF | (Australia) Kyra Cooney-Cross | 0 | 0 | 1 | 0 | 1 |
| Own goal | | | | 5 | 0 | 0 | 2 | 7 |
| Total | | | | 62 | 7 | 5 | 37 | 111 |

==== Disciplinary record ====
| Rank | No. | Position | Name | Super League | | FA Cup | | League Cup | | UWCL | | Total | |
| Rank | No. | Position | Name | Yellow card | Red card | Yellow card | Red card | Yellow card | Red card | Yellow card | Red card | Yellow card | Red card |
|---|---|---|---|---|---|---|---|---|---|---|---|---|---|
| 1 | 11 | DF | (Republic of Ireland) Katie McCabe | 5 | 1 | 1 | 0 | 0 | 0 | 1 | 0 | 7 | 1 |
| 2 | 5 | DF | (Spain) Laia Codina | 1 | 0 | 0 | 0 | 0 | 0 | 3 | 0 | 4 | 0 |
| 2 | 19 | FW | (Australia) Caitlin Foord | 1 | 0 | 0 | 0 | 0 | 0 | 3 | 0 | 4 | 0 |
| 4 | 7 | DF | (Australia) Steph Catley | 2 | 0 | 0 | 0 | 0 | 0 | 1 | 0 | 3 | 0 |
| 4 | 10 | MF | (Scotland) Kim Little | 1 | 0 | 0 | 0 | 0 | 0 | 2 | 0 | 3 | 0 |
| 4 | 18 | FW | (England) Chloe Kelly | 1 | 0 | 0 | 0 | 0 | 0 | 2 | 0 | 3 | 0 |
| 7 | 8 | FW | (Spain) Mariona Caldentey | 2 | 0 | 0 | 0 | 0 | 0 | 0 | 0 | 2 | 0 |
| 7 | 9 | FW | (England) Beth Mead | 1 | 0 | 0 | 0 | 0 | 0 | 1 | 0 | 2 | 0 |
| 7 | 12 | MF | (Norway) Frida Maanum | 1 | 0 | 0 | 0 | 0 | 0 | 1 | 0 | 2 | 0 |
| 10 | 3 | DF | (England) Lotte Wubben-Moy | 0 | 0 | 0 | 0 | 0 | 0 | 1 | 0 | 1 | 0 |
| 10 | 6 | DF | (England) Leah Williamson | 1 | 0 | 0 | 0 | 0 | 0 | 0 | 0 | 1 | 0 |
| 10 | 13 | MF | (Switzerland) Lia Wälti | 1 | 0 | 0 | 0 | 0 | 0 | 0 | 0 | 1 | 0 |
| 10 | 14 | GK | (Netherlands) Daphne van Domselaar | 0 | 0 | 0 | 0 | 0 | 0 | 1 | 0 | 1 | 0 |
| 10 | 28 | DF | (Sweden) Amanda Ilestedt | 0 | 0 | 1 | 0 | 0 | 0 | 0 | 0 | 1 | 0 |
| 10 | 32 | MF | (Australia) Kyra Cooney-Cross | 1 | 0 | 0 | 0 | 0 | 0 | 0 | 0 | 1 | 0 |
| 10 | 62 | DF | (England) Katie Reid | 0 | 0 | 0 | 0 | 1 | 0 | 0 | 0 | 1 | 0 |
| Total | | | | 18 | 1 | 2 | 0 | 1 | 0 | 16 | 0 | 37 | 1 |

==== Clean sheets ====
| Rank | No. | Name | Super League | FA Cup | League Cup | UWCL | Total |
|---|---|---|---|---|---|---|---|
| 1 | 14 | (Netherlands) Daphne van Domselaar | 10 | 0 | 0 | 4 | 14 |
| 2 | 1 | (Austria) Manuela Zinsberger | 1 | 2 | 1 | 3 | 7 |
| Total | | | 11 | 2 | 1 | 7 | 21 |

== Transfers, loans and other signings ==
=== Transfers in ===
| Announcement date | No. | Position | Player | From club |
|---|---|---|---|---|
| 2 July 2024 | 8 | FW | (Spain) Mariona Caldentey | (Spain) Barcelona |
| 31 July 2024 | 14 | GK | (Netherlands) Daphne van Domselaar | (England) Aston Villa |
| 13 August 2024 | 16 | FW | (Sweden) Rosa Kafaji | (Sweden) BK Häcken |
| 30 January 2025 | 22 | DF | (United States) Jenna Nighswonger | (United States) NJ/NY Gotham FC |

=== Loans in ===
| Announcement date | No. | Position | Player | From club |
|---|---|---|---|---|
| 30 January 2025 | 18 | FW | (England) Chloe Kelly | (England) Manchester City |

=== Contract extensions ===
| Announcement date | No. | Position | Player | At Arsenal since |
|---|---|---|---|---|
| 21 May 2024 | 25 | FW | (Sweden) Stina Blackstenius | 2022 |
| 27 May 2024 | 6 | DF | (England) Leah Williamson | 2014 |
| 11 June 2024 | 26 | DF | (Austria) Laura Wienroither | 2022 |
| 13 February 2025 | 10 | MF | (Scotland) Kim Little | 2016 |
| 22 April 2025 | 3 | DF | (England) Lotte Wubben-Moy | 2020 |
| 20 May 2025 | 12 | MF | (Norway) Frida Maanum | 2021 |

=== Transfers out ===
| Announcement date | No. | Position | Player | To club |
|---|---|---|---|---|
| 13 May 2024 | 11 | FW | (Netherlands) Vivianne Miedema | (England) Manchester City |
| 15 May 2024 | 14 | GK | (Canada) Sabrina D'Angelo | (England) Aston Villa |
| 15 May 2024 | 18 | GK | (United States) Kaylan Marckese | (United States) Tampa Bay Sun FC |
| 2 August 2024 | 20 | FW | (Brazil) Giovana Queiroz | (Spain) Atlético Madrid |
| 14 August 2024 | 24 | FW | (Canada) Cloé Lacasse | (United States) Utah Royals |
| 18 January 2025 | 22 | MF | (Denmark) Kathrine Møller Kühl | (Italy) AS Roma |

=== Loans out ===
| Announcement date | No. | Position | Player | To club |
|---|---|---|---|---|
| 15 August 2024 | 29 | DF | (England) Teyah Goldie | (England) London City Lionesses |
| 13 September 2024 | 59 | FW | (England) Michelle Agyemang | (England) Brighton & Hove Albion |
| 18 January 2025 | 53 | FW | (England) Vivienne Lia | (England) Southampton |
| 20 January 2025 | 61 | MF | (England) Madison Earl | (England) Sheffield United |
| 23 January 2025 | 56 | MF | (England) Freya Godfrey | (England) London City Lionesses |
| 23 January 2025 | 60 | MF | (England) Laila Harbert | (England) Southampton |
| 30 January 2025 | 26 | DF | (Austria) Laura Wienroither | (England) Manchester City |

== Suspensions ==
| No. | Position | Player | Games suspended | Reason |
|---|---|---|---|---|
| 11 | DF | (Republic of Ireland) Katie McCabe | v. Bristol City, 29 January 2025 v. Manchester City, 2 February 2025 | Dissent (Red card offence) |
| 11 | DF | (Republic of Ireland) Katie McCabe | v. Crystal Palace, 30 March 2025 | Yellow card accumulation |

== Club ==
=== Kits ===
Supplier: Adidas / Sponsor: Fly Emirates / Sleeve sponsor: Visit Rwanda

Kits using Adidas's Three Stripes trademark
| Home | Away | Away alt.^{1} | Away alt.^{2} | "No More Red" | GK^{1} | Goalkeeper^{1} alt. | Goalkeeper^{2} | Goalkeeper^{4} |

Kits using Adidas's Trefoil trademark
| Third | Third alt. | Goalkeeper^{3} | Goalkeeper^{5} |

=== Kit information ===
This is Adidas's sixth year supplying Arsenal kit, having taken over from Puma at the beginning of the 2019–20 season.

- Home: The club revealed their new home kit for the 2024–25 season on 16 May 2024. The kit uses Arsenal's traditional colours of red and white. The shirt has a red body and white sleeves with blue stripes on the collar and shoulders, and is complemented by white shorts and red socks. This is the first time the club's iconic cannon has featured outside the crest on the home shirt since 1989–90. The kit was launched alongside a film named The Year of the Cannon.
- Away: On 18 July, the Gunners released their new away kit, which honours the connection between the club, north London, and Africa, recognising Arsenal's African players and supporters. The shirt has a black base with red-and-green stripes on the collar and shoulders, and is combined with black shorts and black socks. A white zig-zag graphic runs down the arms and flanks of the torso. White shorts and socks were used in some away games when there was a colour clash with the home team's kit. The kit was launched with an accompanying video named From Africa to Arsenal and back again 🌍.
- Third: The new third kit was revealed on 12 August. The shirt has an aqua blue coloured base with a lilac purple fade along the front. The collar and shoulder also contain navy blue stripes. The shirt is partnered with navy shorts and socks. Aqua socks were used in some away games when there was a colour clash with the home team's kit. The kit was launched alongside a film named Arsenal. An Original. Always. 💜💙.
- No More Red: On 10 January 2025, Arsenal announced that they would extend their "No More Red" campaign – an initiative that aims to help keep young people safe from knife crime and youth violence – for a fourth season. The all-white kit was launched alongside a film named Safe spaces. Role models. Connections.
- Goalkeeper: The new goalkeeper kits are based on Adidas's goalkeeper template for the season.

== Pre-season ==
On 10 June 2024, Arsenal announced that the club would partake in a pre-season tour of the United States for the first time.

| 18 August 2024 | Washington Spirit (United States) | 1–2 | (England) Arsenal | Washington, D.C., United States |
| 14:00 EDT | Sarr 45+2' | Report | Russo 10', 74'; Kafaji (yellow card) 83' | Stadium: Audi Field; Attendance: 15,062 |

| 25 August 2024 | Arsenal (England) | 0–1 | (England) Chelsea | Washington, D.C., United States |
| 16:00 EDT | | Report | Baltimore 48' | Stadium: Audi Field; Attendance: 17,130 |

| 31 August 2024 | Southampton (England) | 0–3 | (England) Arsenal | Southampton, England |
| 13:30 BST | | Report | Cooney-Cross 27'; Codina 65', 69' | Stadium: St Mary's Stadium; Attendance: 5,379 |

== Competitions ==
=== Overall record ===
| Competition | First match | Last match | Starting round | Final position | Record | | | | | | | |
| Competition | First match | Last match | Starting round | Final position | Pld | W | D | L | GF | GA | GD | Win % |
|---|---|---|---|---|---|---|---|---|---|---|---|---|
| Women's Super League | 22 September 2024 | 10 May 2025 | Matchday 1 | 2nd | 22 | 15 | 3 | 4 | 62 | 26 | +36 | 68.18 |
| Women's FA Cup | 29 January 2025 | 9 March 2025 | Fourth round | Quarter-finals | 3 | 2 | 0 | 1 | 7 | 1 | +6 | 66.67 |
| FA Women's League Cup | 22 January 2025 | 6 February 2025 | Quarter-finals | Semi-finals | 2 | 1 | 0 | 1 | 5 | 2 | +3 | 50.00 |
| UEFA Women's Champions League | 4 September 2024 | 24 May 2025 | First qualifying round | Winners | 15 | 11 | 0 | 4 | 37 | 15 | +22 | 73.33 |
| Total | | | | | 42 | 29 | 3 | 10 | 111 | 44 | +67 | 69.05 |

Source: FA WSL

=== Women's Super League ===
==== League table ====
| Pos | Team | Pld | W | D | L | GF | GA | GD | Pts | Qualification or relegation |
|---|---|---|---|---|---|---|---|---|---|---|
| 1 | Chelsea (C) | 22 | 19 | 3 | 0 | 56 | 13 | +43 | 60 | Qualification for the Champions League league stage (Note: Arsenal qualified for the Champions League league phase as the 2024–25 UEFA Women's Champions League winners.) |
| 2 | Arsenal | 22 | 15 | 3 | 4 | 62 | 26 | +36 | 48 | Qualification for the Champions League league stage |
| 3 | Manchester United | 22 | 13 | 5 | 4 | 41 | 16 | +25 | 44 | Qualification for the Champions League second qualifying round |
| 4 | Manchester City | 22 | 13 | 4 | 5 | 49 | 28 | +21 | 43 | |
| 5 | Brighton & Hove Albion | 22 | 8 | 4 | 10 | 35 | 41 | −6 | 28 | |

Source: The Football Association
Rules for classification: 1) Points; 2) Goal difference; 3) Number of goals scored.
(C) Champions

==== Results summary ====
| Overall | | | | | | | | Home | | | | | | Away | | | | | |
| Pld | W | D | L | GF | GA | GD | Pts | W | D | L | GF | GA | GD | W | D | L | GF | GA | GD |
|---|---|---|---|---|---|---|---|---|---|---|---|---|---|---|---|---|---|---|---|
| 22 | 15 | 3 | 4 | 62 | 26 | +36 | 48 | 8 | 2 | 1 | 39 | 11 | +28 | 7 | 1 | 3 | 23 | 15 | +8 |

Last updated: 10 May 2025.
Source: FA WSL

==== Results by matchday ====
| Matchday | 1 | 2 | 3 | 4 | 5 | 6 | 7 | 8 | 9 | 10 | 11 | 12 | 13 | 14 | 15 | 16 | 17 | 18 | 19 | 20 | 21 | 22 |
|---|---|---|---|---|---|---|---|---|---|---|---|---|---|---|---|---|---|---|---|---|---|---|
| Ground | H | A | H | H | A | A | H | A | H | A | H | A | A | H | H | A | H | A | H | A | A | H |
| Result | D | W | D | L | W | D | W | W | W | W | W | L | W | W | W | W | W | W | W | L | L | W |
| Position | 5 | 4 | 6 | 6 | 5 | 5 | 4 | 4 | 3 | 3 | 2 | 4 | 3 | 3 | 3 | 2 | 2 | 2 | 2 | 2 | 2 | 2 |

Updated to match(es) played on 10 May 2025. Source: FA WSL
A = Away; H = Home; W = Win; D = Draw; L = Loss; P = Postponed

==== Matches ====
| 22 September 2024 1 | Arsenal | 2–2 | Manchester City | Holloway |
| 12:30 BST | Maanum 8'; Mead 81' | Report | Miedema 42'; Park 58' (yellow card) 84'; Casparij (yellow card) 79'; Greenwood (yellow card) 81'; Hemp (yellow card) 90+3'; Shaw (yellow card) 90+3' | Stadium: Emirates Stadium; Attendance: 41,818; Referee: Abigail Byrne |

| 29 September 2024 2 | Leicester City | 0–1 | Arsenal | Leicester |
| 15:00 BST | | Report | Maanum 55'; Codina (yellow card) 90+4' | Stadium: King Power Stadium; Attendance: 5,163; Referee: Jane Simms |

| 6 October 2024 3 | Arsenal | 0–0 | Everton | Holloway |
| 14:00 BST | | Report | H. Payne (yellow card) 80'; Brosnan (yellow card) 90+4' | Stadium: Emirates Stadium; Attendance: 25,480; Referee: Stacey Pearson |

| 12 October 2024 4 | Arsenal | 1–2 | Chelsea | Holloway |
| 13:45 BST | Williamson (yellow card) 33'; Foord 43', (yellow card) 52' | Report | Ramírez 4'; Baltimore 16', (yellow card) 88'; Björn (yellow card) 90+1'; Cuthbert (yellow card) 90+1' | Stadium: Emirates Stadium; Attendance: 45,860; Referee: Cheryl Foster |

| 20 October 2024 5 | West Ham United | 0–2 | Arsenal | Dagenham |
| 15:00 BST | Asseyi (yellow card) 40' | Report | Caldentey 71' (pen.), (yellow card) 82'; Kafaji 89' | Stadium: Victoria Road; Attendance: 3,300; Referee: Thomas Parsons |

| 3 November 2024 6 | Manchester United | 1–1 | Arsenal | Leigh |
| 12:30 GMT | Turner (yellow card) 57'; Malard 82'; Geyse (yellow card) 87' | Report | Little (yellow card) 10'; Russo 63'; McCabe (yellow card) 87' | Stadium: Leigh Sports Village; Attendance: 8,348; Referee: Kirsty Dowle |

| 8 November 2024 7 | Arsenal | 5–0 | Brighton & Hove Albion | Holloway |
| 19:00 GMT | Mead 13'; Foord 22'; Maanum 25'; Hurtig 76'; Russo 90+5' (pen.) | Report | Bergsvand (yellow card) 40'; Haley (yellow card) 64' | Stadium: Emirates Stadium; Attendance: 22,467; Referee: Amy Fearn |

| 16 November 2024 8 | Tottenham Hotspur | 0–3 | Arsenal | Tottenham |
| 13:45 GMT | Spence (yellow card) 23'; Hunt (yellow card) 52'; Summanen (yellow card) 84'; Gunning-Williams (yellow card) 90+3' | Report | Russo 2'; Maanum 22'; Blackstenius 66'; McCabe (yellow card) 73'; Cooney-Cross (yellow card) 78'; Catley (yellow card) 90' | Stadium: Tottenham Hotspur Stadium; Attendance: 28,852; Referee: Emily Heaslip |

| 8 December 2024 9 | Arsenal | 4–0 | Aston Villa | Holloway |
| 14:00 GMT | Russo 17', 90+4'; Mead 39'; Blackstenius 70'; McCabe (yellow card) 89' | Report | Patten (yellow card) 16' | Stadium: Emirates Stadium; Attendance: 29,515; Referee: Abigail Byrne |

| 15 December 2024 10 | Liverpool | 0–1 | Arsenal | St Helens |
| 14:30 GMT | Hinds (yellow card) 62' | Report | Russo 20'; Caldentey (penalty missed) 27', (yellow card) 82' | Stadium: Totally Wicked Stadium; Attendance: 5,786; Referee: Melissa Burgin |

| 19 January 2025 11 | Arsenal | 5–0 | Crystal Palace | Borehamwood |
| 14:00 GMT | Williamson 6'; Russo 63'; Mead 67'; Caldentey 75' (pen.), 90+5' | Report | Potter (yellow card) 84'; Nolan (yellow card) 90+4' | Stadium: Meadow Park; Attendance: 3,576; Referee: Phoebe Cross |

| 26 January 2025 12 | Chelsea | 1–0 | Arsenal | Fulham |
| 12:30 GMT | Reiten 84' (pen.); Cuthbert (yellow card) 90' | Report | McCabe (yellow card) 82' (red card) 82' | Stadium: Stamford Bridge; Attendance: 34,302; Referee: Emily Heaslip |

| 2 February 2025 13 | Manchester City | 3–4 | Arsenal | Manchester |
| 12:00 GMT | Fowler 19', 55' (pen.); Miedema 50'; Casparij (yellow card) 79' | Report | Caldentey 1'; Wubben-Moy 8'; Maanum 51'; Blackstenius 78' | Stadium: Academy Stadium; Attendance: 4,922; Referee: Cheryl Foster |

| 16 February 2025 14 | Arsenal | 5–0 | Tottenham Hotspur | Holloway |
| 12:30 GMT | Hunt 15' (o.g.); Caldentey 35'; Maanum 51'; Russo 58'; Fox 90' | Report | Csiki (yellow card) 37'; Hunt (yellow card) 47'; Nildén (yellow card) 51' | Stadium: Emirates Stadium; Attendance: 56,784; Referee: Stacey Fullicks |

| 2 March 2025 15 | Arsenal | 4–3 | West Ham United | Borehamwood |
| 17:30 GMT | Kelly 44', (yellow card) 52'; McCabe 56'; Williamson 58'; Caldentey 62' (pen.) | Report | Tysiak 7', 12'; Martinez 51'; Asseyi (yellow card) 67' | Stadium: Meadow Park; Attendance: 3,621; Referee: Ade Soneye |

| 14 March 2025 16 | Everton | 1–3 | Arsenal | Walton |
| 19:00 GMT | Payne 36' | Report | Russo 24', 90'; Mjelde 63' (o.g.) | Stadium: Walton Hall Park; Attendance: 1,613; Referee: Grace Lowe |

| 22 March 2025 17 | Arsenal | 4–0 | Liverpool | Holloway |
| 17:30 GMT | Foord 28'; Matthews 29', 69' (o.g.); Caldentey 44'; McCabe (yellow card) 45+3' | Report | Kiernan (yellow card) 90+4' | Stadium: Emirates Stadium; Attendance: 35,628; Referee: Stacey Fullicks |

| 30 March 2025 18 | Crystal Palace | 0–4 | Arsenal | Sutton |
| 14:00 BST | | Report | Mead 14', 90+1'; Russo 26'; Swaby 77' (o.g.) | Stadium: VBS Community Stadium; Attendance: 2,885; Referee: Emily Heaslip |

| 15 April 2025 19 | Arsenal | 5–1 | Leicester City | Holloway |
| 19:30 BST | Foord 9', 31'; Blackstenius 16'; Maanum (yellow card) 36'; Mead 62'; Pelova 69' | Report | Momiki 66'; Goodwin (yellow card) 68' | Stadium: Emirates Stadium; Attendance: 5,539; Referee: Melissa Burgin |

| 30 April 2025 20 | Aston Villa | 5–2 | Arsenal | Aston |
| 18:00 BST | Nobbs 30'; Hanson 45+1'; Grant 46', 73'; Daly 59'; D'Angelo (yellow card) 76' | Report | Blackstenius 68'; Russo 71'; Catley (yellow card) 85' | Stadium: Villa Park; Attendance: 4,590; Referee: Grace Lowe |

| 5 May 2025 21 | Brighton & Hove Albion | 4–2 | Arsenal | Crawley |
| 16:00 BST | Kirby 16'; Olislagers (yellow card) 21'; Čanković 43', 52'; Thorisdottir (yellow card) 45'; Seike 54'; Hayes (yellow card) 85'; Noordam (yellow card) 86' | Report | Foord 29'; Caldentey 90+3' | Stadium: Broadfield Stadium; Attendance: 4,786; Referee: Amy Fearn |

| 10 May 2025 22 | Arsenal | 4–3 | Manchester United | Holloway |
| 12:30 BST | Kelly 2'; Caldentey 50' (pen.); Maanum 56'; Little 61'; Wälti (yellow card) 82'; Mead (yellow card) 90+5' | Report | Toone 13'; Terland 70'; Le Tissier 76' (pen.); Miyazawa (yellow card) 79' | Stadium: Emirates Stadium; Attendance: 46,603; Referee: Melissa Burgin |

=== FA Cup ===
As a member of the top tier, Arsenal entered the FA Cup in the fourth round.

| 29 January 2025 Fourth round | Arsenal | 5–0 | Bristol City | Borehamwood |
| 19:45 GMT | Blackstenius 3', 16'; Maanum 8'; Mead 25', 54' | Report | | Stadium: Meadow Park; Attendance: 2,808; Referee: Amy Fearn |
Note: Originally scheduled for 12 January, this match was postponed and rescheduled due to a frozen pitch.

| 9 February 2025 Fifth round | Arsenal | 2–0 | London City Lionesses | Borehamwood |
| 14:00 GMT | Codina 32'; Blackstenius 81'; Ilestedt (yellow card) 90+4' | Report | Asllani (yellow card) 73'; Brougham (yellow card) 74' | Stadium: Meadow Park; Attendance: 2,453; Referee: Abigail Byrne |

| 9 March 2025 Quarter-finals | Arsenal | 0–1 | Liverpool | Borehamwood |
| 14:30 GMT | McCabe (yellow card) 54' | Report | Höbinger (yellow card) 18'; Matthews (yellow card) 39'; Bonner (yellow card) 45+4'; Van Domselaar 78' (o.g.) | Stadium: Meadow Park; Attendance: 3,148; Referee: Stacey Pearson |

=== League Cup ===
As Arsenal progressed to the 2024–25 UEFA Women's Champions League group stage, they entered the League Cup at the quarter-final stage.

==== Knockout stage ====
| 22 January 2025 Quarter finals | Brighton & Hove Albion | 0–4 | Arsenal | Crawley |
| 19:15 GMT | McLauchlan (yellow card) 89' | Report | Reid (yellow card) 52'; Maanum 65'; McCabe 68'; Cooney-Cross 70'; Caldentey 83' | Stadium: Broadfield Stadium; Attendance: 2,150; Referee: Lisa Benn |

| 6 February 2025 Semi finals | Arsenal | 1–2 | Manchester City | Borehamwood |
| 19:30 GMT | Caldentey 58' (pen.) | Report | Fowler 26', 90+5', (penalty missed) 61'; Layzell (yellow card) 45' | Stadium: Meadow Park; Attendance: 2,065; Referee: Kirsty Dowle |
Note: Originally scheduled for a 19:00 kick-off, this match was delayed 30 minutes due to a broken down ambulance.

=== UEFA Women's Champions League ===
Having finished third in the 2023–24 Women's Super League, Arsenal entered the Champions League in the first qualifying round.

==== First qualifying round ====
| 4 September 2024 Semi Final | Arsenal (England) | 6–0 | (Scotland) Rangers | Borehamwood |
| 19:30 BST | Foord 16', 59', 69', 90'; Russo 60'; Little 86' (pen.) | Report | | Stadium: Meadow Park; Attendance: 3,487; Referee: Rasa Grigonė (Lithuania) |

| 7 September 2024 Final | Arsenal (England) | 1–0 | (Norway) Rosenborg | Borehamwood |
| 19:30 BST | Maanum 19' | Report | Magnúsdóttir (yellow card) 47' | Stadium: Meadow Park; Attendance: 3,164; Referee: Michalina Diakow (Poland) |

==== Second qualifying round ====
| 18 September 2024 First Leg | BK Häcken (Sweden) | 1–0 | (England) Arsenal | Gothenburg |
| 18:00 BST | Bergström (yellow card) 45+1'; Tindell 77'; Anvegård (yellow card) 85' | Report | Codina (yellow card) 38'; Mead (yellow card) 69'; Little (yellow card) 81'; Maanum (yellow card) 85' | Stadium: Hisingen Arena; Attendance: 5,863; Referee: Riem Hussein (Germany) |

| 26 September 2024 Second Leg | Arsenal (England) | 4–0 (4–1 agg.) | (Sweden) BK Häcken | Borehamwood |
| 19:30 BST | Wubben-Moy (yellow card) 17'; Wälti 24'; Caldentey 40'; Mead 50'; Maanum 78' | Report | Wijk (yellow card) 57' | Stadium: Meadow Park; Attendance: 2,828; Referee: Catarina Campos (Portugal) |

==== Group stage ====
| Pos | Team | Pld | W | D | L | GF | GA | GD | Pts | Qualification | ARS | BAY | JUV | VÅL |
|---|---|---|---|---|---|---|---|---|---|---|---|---|---|---|
| 1 | (England) Arsenal | 6 | 5 | 0 | 1 | 17 | 9 | +8 | 15 | Advance to quarter-finals | — | 3–2 | 1–0 | 4–1 |
| 2 | (Germany) Bayern Munich | 6 | 4 | 1 | 1 | 17 | 6 | +11 | 13 | Advance to quarter-finals | 5–2 | — | 4–0 | 3–0 |
| 3 | (Italy) Juventus | 6 | 2 | 0 | 4 | 4 | 11 | −7 | 6 | | 0–4 | 0–2 | — | 3–0 |
| 4 | (Norway) Vålerenga | 6 | 0 | 1 | 5 | 3 | 15 | −12 | 1 | | 1–3 | 1–1 | 0–1 | — |

Source: UEFA
Rules for classification: Group stage tiebreakers

| 9 October 2024 1 | Bayern Munich (Germany) | 5–2 | (England) Arsenal | Munich |
| 17:45 BST | Viggósdóttir 43'; Lohmann 56'; Harder 73', 78', 86' | Report | Caldentey 30'; Codina (yellow card) 41', (goal) 65' | Stadium: FC Bayern Campus; Attendance: 2,500; Referee: Lina Lehtovaara (Finland) |

| 16 October 2024 2 | Arsenal (England) | 4–1 | (Norway) Vålerenga | Holloway |
| 20:00 BST | Fox 2'; Foord 29', (yellow card) 67'; Codina (yellow card) 84'; Caldentey 85'; Russo 90+3' | Report | Thorsnes (yellow card) 18'; Tvedten 35' | Stadium: Emirates Stadium; Attendance: 5,613; Referee: Marta Huerta De Aza (Spain) |

| 12 November 2024 3 | Juventus (Italy) | 0–4 | (England) Arsenal | Biella |
| 17:45 GMT | Schatzer (yellow card) 68' | Report | Maanum 38'; Catley (yellow card) 60'; Blackstenius 75'; Caldentey 80'; Foord 87' | Stadium: Stadio La Marmora-Pozzo; Attendance: 1,427; Referee: Jelena Cvetković (Serbia) |

| 21 November 2024 4 | Arsenal (England) | 1–0 | (Italy) Juventus | Holloway |
| 20:00 GMT | Hurtig 89' | Report | Cascarino (yellow card) 36' | Stadium: Emirates Stadium; Attendance: 9,963; Referee: Ewa Augustyn (Poland) |

| 12 December 2024 5 | Vålerenga (Norway) | 1–3 | (England) Arsenal | Oslo |
| 17:45 GMT | Lindwall 85' | Report | Russo 25', 58'; Maanum 37' | Stadium: Intility Arena; Attendance: 4,333; Referee: Eleni Antoniou (Greece) |

| 18 December 2024 6 | Arsenal (England) | 3–2 | (Germany) Bayern Munich | Borehamwood |
| 20:00 GMT | Viggósdóttir 7' (o.g.); Russo 59'; Foord (yellow card) 74'; Caldentey 86' (pen.); McCabe (yellow card) 90+4' | Report | Eriksson 39', 58'; Stanway (yellow card) 67' | Stadium: Meadow Park; Attendance: 3,385; Referee: Tess Olofsson (Sweden) |
Note: Originally scheduled to be played at Emirates Stadium, this match was moved to Meadow Park due to a fixture clash with Arsenal Men competing in the EFL Cup.

==== Knockout phase ====
===== Quarter-finals =====
| 18 March 2025 First leg | Real Madrid (Spain) | 2–0 | (England) Arsenal | Madrid |
| 17:45 GMT | Caicedo 22'; Athenea 82'; Carmona (yellow card) 90+1'; Rodríguez (yellow card) 90+4' | Report | Kelly (yellow card) 89' | Stadium: Alfredo Di Stéfano Stadium; Attendance: 3,102; Referee: Frida Klarlund (Denmark) |

| 26 March 2025 Second leg | Arsenal (England) | 3–0 (3–2 agg.) | (Spain) Real Madrid | Holloway |
| 20:00 GMT | Russo 46', 59'; Caldentey 49' | Report | | Stadium: Emirates Stadium; Attendance: 22,517; Referee: Silvia Gasperotti (Italy) |

===== Semi-finals =====
| 19 April 2025 First leg | Arsenal (England) | 1–2 | (France) Lyon | Holloway |
| 12:30 BST | Foord (yellow card) 3'; Little (yellow card) 55'; Caldentey 78' (pen.) | Report | Diani 17'; Endler (yellow card) 76'; Dumornay 82' | Stadium: Emirates Stadium; Attendance: 40,045; Referee: Alina Peşu (Romania) |

| 27 April 2025 Second leg | Lyon (France) | 1–4 (3–5 agg.) | (England) Arsenal | Décines-Charpieu |
| 17:00 BST | Egurrola (yellow card) 60'; Dumornay 81' | Report | Endler 5' (o.g.); Caldentey 45+1'; Russo 46'; Foord 63'; Van Domselaar (yellow card) 87' | Stadium: Parc Olympique Lyonnais; Attendance: 20,015; Referee: Maria Caputi (Italy) |

===== Final =====
| 24 May 2025 Final | Arsenal (England) | 1–0 | (Spain) Barcelona | Lisbon |
| 17:00 BST | Kelly (yellow card) 65'; Blackstenius 74' | Report | Paredes (yellow card) 50'; Paralluelo (yellow card) 88' | Stadium: Estádio José Alvalade; Attendance: 38,356; Referee: Ivana Martinčić (Croatia) |
