= 2024–25 in Italian football =

Football in Italy
- Season: 2024–25

Men's football
- Serie A: Napoli
- Serie B: Sassuolo
- Serie C: Padova (Group A); Virtus Entella (Group B); Avellino (Group C)
- Serie D: Livorno
- Coppa Italia: Bologna
- Coppa Italia Serie C: Rimini
- Supercoppa Italiana: Milan

Women's football
- Serie A: Juventus
- Coppa Italia: Juventus
- Supercoppa Italiana: Roma

The 2024–25 season was the 123rd season of competitive football in Italy.

== National teams ==
=== Men ===
==== Italy national football team ====
===== 2024–25 UEFA Nations League =====
====== 2024–25 UEFA Nations League A Group 2 ======
| Pos | Team | Pld | W | D | L | GF | GA | GD | Pts | Qualification or relegation | (France) | (Italy) | (Belgium) | (Israel) |
|---|---|---|---|---|---|---|---|---|---|---|---|---|---|---|
| 1 | France | 6 | 4 | 1 | 1 | 12 | 6 | +6 | 13 (Note: Tied on head to head results. Overall goal difference: France +6, Italy +5.) | Advance to quarter-finals | — | 1–3 | 2–0 | 0–0 |
| 2 | Italy | 6 | 4 | 1 | 1 | 13 | 8 | +5 | 13 | Advance to quarter-finals | 1–3 | — | 2–2 | 4–1 |
| 3 | Belgium (O) | 6 | 1 | 1 | 4 | 6 | 9 | −3 | 4 (Note: Tied on head to head points. Head to head goal difference: Belgium +1, Israel –1.) | Qualification for relegation play-offs | 1–2 | 0–1 | — | 3–1 |
| 4 | Israel (R) | 6 | 1 | 1 | 4 | 5 | 13 | −8 | 4 | Relegation to League B | 1–4 | 1–2 | 1–0 | — |

Source: UEFA
Rules for classification: Tiebreakers
(O) Play-off winners; (R) Relegated
Notes:

| 6 September 2024 | France | 1–3 | Italy | Paris, France |
| 20:45 CEST (UTC+02:00) | | Report | | Stadium: Parc des Princes |

| 9 September 2024 | Israel | 1–2 | Italy | Budapest, Hungary |
| 20:45 CEST (UTC+02:00) | | Report | | Stadium: Bozsik József Stadion (Note: Due to the Gaza war, Israel are required to play their home matches at neutral venues until further notice.) |

| 10 October 2024 | Italy | 2–2 | Belgium | Rome, Italy |
| 20:45 CEST (UTC+02:00) | | Report | | Stadium: Stadio Olimpico |

| 14 October 2024 | Italy | 4–1 | Israel | Udine, Italy |
| 20:45 CEST (UTC+02:00) | | Report | | Stadium: Stadio Friuli |

| 14 November 2024 | Belgium | 0–1 | Italy | Brussels, Belgium |
| 20:45 CEST (UTC+01:00) | | Report | | Stadium: King Baudouin Stadium |

| 17 November 2024 | Italy | 1–3 | France | Milan, Italy |
| 20:45 CEST (UTC+01:00) | | Report | | Stadium: San Siro |

====== Quarter-finals ======
| Team 1 | Agg. | Team 2 | 1st leg | 2nd leg |
|---|---|---|---|---|
| Italy | 4–5 | Germany | 1–2 | 3–3 |

| 20 March 2025 | Italy | 1–2 | Germany | Milan |
| | Tonali 9' | Report | Kleindienst 49'; Goretzka 76' | Stadium: San Siro; Attendance: 60,334; Referee: François Letexier (France) |

| 23 March 2025 | Germany | 3–3 (5–4 agg.) | Italy | Dortmund, Germany |
| | Kimmich 30' (pen.); Musiala 36'; Kleindiesnt 45' | Report | Kean 49', 69'; Raspadori 90+5' (pen.) | Stadium: Westfalenstadion; Attendance: 64,762; Referee: Szymon Marciniak (Poland) |

===== 2026 FIFA World Cup qualification =====
====== Group I ======
| Pos | Team | Pld | W | D | L | GF | GA | GD | Pts | Qualification | (Norway national football team) | (Italy national football team) | (Israel national football team) | (Estonia national football team) | (Moldova national football team) |
|---|---|---|---|---|---|---|---|---|---|---|---|---|---|---|---|
| 1 | Norway | 8 | 8 | 0 | 0 | 37 | 5 | +32 | 24 | Qualification for 2026 FIFA World Cup | — | 3–0 | 5–0 | 4–1 | 11–1 |
| 2 | Italy | 8 | 6 | 0 | 2 | 21 | 12 | +9 | 18 | Advance to play-offs | 1–4 | — | 3–0 | 5–0 | 2–0 |
| 3 | Israel | 8 | 4 | 0 | 4 | 19 | 20 | −1 | 12 | | 2–4 | 4–5 | — | 2–1 | 4–1 |
| 4 | Estonia | 8 | 1 | 1 | 6 | 8 | 21 | −13 | 4 | | 0–1 | 1–3 | 1–3 | — | 1–1 |
| 5 | Moldova | 8 | 0 | 1 | 7 | 5 | 32 | −27 | 1 | | 0–5 | 0–2 | 0–4 | 2–3 | — |

Source: FIFA, UEFA

=== Women ===
==== Italy women's national football team ====
===== Friendlies =====
| 25 October 2024 | Italy | 5–0 | Malta | Roma |
| 18:15 | | | | Stadium: Stadio Tre Fontane |

| 29 October 2024 | Italy | 1–1 | Spain | Vicenza |
| 18:15 | | Report | | Stadium: Stadio Romeo Menti |

| 2 December 2024 | Germany | 1–2 | Italy | Bochum |
| 20:30 | | | | Stadium: Ruhrstadion |

==== UEFA Women's Euro 2025 qualifying League A ====
| Pos | Team | Pld | W | D | L | GF | GA | GD | Pts | Qualification | (Italy) | (Netherlands) | (Norway) | (Finland) |
|---|---|---|---|---|---|---|---|---|---|---|---|---|---|---|
| 1 | Italy | 6 | 2 | 3 | 1 | 8 | 3 | +5 | 9 (Note: Head-to-head points: Italy 4, Netherlands 1.) | Qualify for final tournament | — | 2–0 | 1–1 | 4–0 |
| 2 | Netherlands | 6 | 2 | 3 | 1 | 4 | 4 | 0 | 9 | Qualify for final tournament | 0–0 | — | 1–0 | 1–0 |
| 3 | Norway | 6 | 1 | 4 | 1 | 7 | 4 | +3 | 7 | Advance to play-offs (seeded) | 0–0 | 1–1 | — | 4–0 |
| 4 | Finland (R) | 6 | 1 | 2 | 3 | 4 | 12 | −8 | 5 | Advance to play-offs (seeded) and relegation to League B | 2–1 | 1–1 | 1–1 | — |

Source: UEFA
Rules for classification: Tiebreakers
(R) Relegated
Notes:

| 12 July 2024 | Netherlands | 0–0 | Italy | Sittard |
| TBC | | | | Stadium: Fortuna Sittard Stadion |

| 16 July 2024 | Italy | 4–0 | Finland | Bolzano |
| 19:00 | | Report | | Stadium: Stadio Druso |

==== 2025 UEFA Women's Nations League ====
===== 2025 UEFA Women's Nations League A Group A4 =====
| Pos | Team | Pld | W | D | L | GF | GA | GD | Pts | Qualification or relegation | (Sweden) | (Italy) | (Denmark) | (Wales) |
|---|---|---|---|---|---|---|---|---|---|---|---|---|---|---|
| 1 | Sweden | 6 | 3 | 3 | 0 | 13 | 6 | +7 | 12 | Qualification for Nations League Finals | — | 3–2 | 6–1 | 1–1 |
| 2 | Italy | 6 | 3 | 1 | 2 | 11 | 7 | +4 | 10 | | 0–0 | — | 1–3 | 1–0 |
| 3 | Denmark (O) | 6 | 3 | 0 | 3 | 8 | 13 | −5 | 9 | Qualification for relegation play-offs | 1–2 | 0–3 | — | 1–0 |
| 4 | Wales (R) | 6 | 0 | 2 | 4 | 4 | 10 | −6 | 2 | Relegation to League B | 1–1 | 1–4 | 1–2 | — |

Source: UEFA
Rules for classification: Tiebreakers
(O) Play-off winners; (R) Relegated

| 21 February 2025 | Italy | 1–0 | Wales |

| 25 February 2025 | Italy | v | Denmark |

| 4 April 2025 | Sweden | v | Italy |

| 8 April 2025 | Denmark | v | Italy |

| 30 May 2025 | Italy | v | Sweden |

| 3 June 2025 | Wales | v | Italy |

== League season ==
=== Men ===
==== Promotions and relegations (pre-season) ====
Teams promoted to Serie A

- Parma
- Como
- Venezia

Teams relegated from Serie A

- Frosinone Calcio
- Sassuolo
- Salernitana

Teams promoted to Serie B

- Mantova (Group A)
- Cesena (Group B)
- Juve Stabia (Group C)
- Carrarese (Play-off)

Teams relegated from Serie B

- Ternana
- Ascoli
- Feralpisalò
- Calcio Lecco

==== Serie A ====
| Pos | Team | Pld | W | D | L | GF | GA | GD | Pts | Qualification or relegation |
|---|---|---|---|---|---|---|---|---|---|---|
| 1 | Napoli (C) | 38 | 24 | 10 | 4 | 59 | 27 | +32 | 82 | Qualification for the Champions League league phase |
| 2 | Inter Milan | 38 | 24 | 9 | 5 | 79 | 35 | +44 | 81 | Qualification for the Champions League league phase |
| 3 | Atalanta | 38 | 22 | 8 | 8 | 78 | 37 | +41 | 74 | Qualification for the Champions League league phase |
| 4 | Juventus | 38 | 18 | 16 | 4 | 58 | 35 | +23 | 70 | Qualification for the Champions League league phase |
| 5 | Roma | 38 | 20 | 9 | 9 | 56 | 35 | +21 | 69 | Qualification for the Europa League league phase |
| 6 | Fiorentina | 38 | 19 | 8 | 11 | 60 | 41 | +19 | 65 (Note: Fiorentina finished ahead of Lazio on head-to-head points: Fiorentina 2–1 Lazio, Lazio 1–2 Fiorentina.) | Qualification for the Conference League play-off round |
| 7 | Lazio | 38 | 18 | 11 | 9 | 61 | 49 | +12 | 65 | |
| 8 | Milan | 38 | 18 | 9 | 11 | 61 | 43 | +18 | 63 | |
| 9 | Bologna | 38 | 16 | 14 | 8 | 57 | 47 | +10 | 62 | Qualification for the Europa League league phase (Note: Bologna qualified for the Europa League league stage as the winners of the 2024–25 Coppa Italia.) |
| 10 | Como | 38 | 13 | 10 | 15 | 49 | 52 | −3 | 49 | |
| 11 | Torino | 38 | 10 | 14 | 14 | 39 | 45 | −6 | 44 (Note: Torino finished ahead of Udinese on head-to-head points: Udinese 2–2 Torino, Torino 2–0 Udinese.) | |
| 12 | Udinese | 38 | 12 | 8 | 18 | 41 | 56 | −15 | 44 | |
| 13 | Genoa | 38 | 10 | 13 | 15 | 37 | 49 | −12 | 43 | |
| 14 | Hellas Verona | 38 | 10 | 7 | 21 | 34 | 66 | −32 | 37 | |
| 15 | Cagliari | 38 | 9 | 9 | 20 | 40 | 56 | −16 | 36 (Note: Cagliari finished ahead of Parma on head-to-head points: Parma 2–3 Cagliari, Cagliari 2–1 Parma.) | |
| 16 | Parma | 38 | 7 | 15 | 16 | 44 | 58 | −14 | 36 | |
| 17 | Lecce | 38 | 8 | 10 | 20 | 27 | 58 | −31 | 34 | |
| 18 | Empoli (R) | 38 | 6 | 13 | 19 | 33 | 59 | −26 | 31 | Relegation to Serie B |
| 19 | Venezia (R) | 38 | 5 | 14 | 19 | 32 | 56 | −24 | 29 | Relegation to Serie B |
| 20 | Monza (R) | 38 | 3 | 9 | 26 | 28 | 69 | −41 | 18 | Relegation to Serie B |

Source: Serie A
Rules for classification: 1) Points; 2) Tiebreaker for Champions team and third relegated team; 3) Head-to-head points; 4) Head-to-head goal difference; 5) Goal difference; 6) Goals scored; 7) Draw.
(Note: Head-to-head record is used only after all the matches between the teams in question have been played)
(C) Champions; (R) Relegated

==== Serie B ====
| Pos | Team | Pld | W | D | L | GF | GA | GD | Pts | Promotion, qualification or relegation |
|---|---|---|---|---|---|---|---|---|---|---|
| 1 | Sassuolo (C, P) | 38 | 25 | 7 | 6 | 78 | 38 | +40 | 82 | Promotion to Serie A |
| 2 | Pisa (P) | 38 | 23 | 7 | 8 | 64 | 35 | +29 | 76 | Promotion to Serie A |
| 3 | Spezia | 38 | 17 | 15 | 6 | 59 | 33 | +26 | 66 | Qualification for promotion play-offs semi-finals |
| 4 | Cremonese (O, P) | 38 | 16 | 13 | 9 | 62 | 44 | +18 | 61 | Qualification for promotion play-offs semi-finals |
| 5 | Juve Stabia | 38 | 14 | 13 | 11 | 42 | 41 | +1 | 55 | Qualification for promotion play-offs preliminary round |
| 6 | Catanzaro | 38 | 11 | 20 | 7 | 51 | 45 | +6 | 53 | Qualification for promotion play-offs preliminary round |
| 7 | Cesena | 38 | 14 | 11 | 13 | 46 | 47 | −1 | 53 | Qualification for promotion play-offs preliminary round |
| 8 | Palermo | 38 | 14 | 10 | 14 | 52 | 43 | +9 | 52 | Qualification for promotion play-offs preliminary round |
| 9 | Bari | 38 | 10 | 18 | 10 | 41 | 40 | +1 | 48 | |
| 10 | Südtirol | 38 | 12 | 10 | 16 | 50 | 57 | −7 | 46 | |
| 11 | Modena | 38 | 10 | 15 | 13 | 48 | 50 | −2 | 45 | |
| 12 | Carrarese | 38 | 11 | 12 | 15 | 39 | 49 | −10 | 45 | |
| 13 | Mantova | 38 | 10 | 14 | 14 | 49 | 58 | −9 | 44 | |
| 14 | Reggiana | 38 | 11 | 11 | 16 | 42 | 52 | −10 | 44 | |
| 15 | Frosinone | 38 | 9 | 16 | 13 | 37 | 50 | −13 | 43 | |
| 16 | Salernitana (R) | 38 | 11 | 9 | 18 | 37 | 47 | −10 | 42 | Qualification for relegation play-out |
| 17 | Sampdoria (O) | 38 | 8 | 17 | 13 | 38 | 49 | −11 | 41 | Qualification for relegation play-out |
| 18 | Brescia (R, E) | 38 | 9 | 16 | 13 | 41 | 48 | −7 | 39 (Note: Brescia were deducted 4 points due to administrative irregularities.) | Excluded and folded |
| 19 | Cittadella (R) | 38 | 10 | 9 | 19 | 30 | 56 | −26 | 39 | Relegation to Serie C |
| 20 | Cosenza (R) | 38 | 7 | 13 | 18 | 32 | 56 | −24 | 30 (Note: Cosenza were deducted 4 points due to administrative irregularities.) | Relegation to Serie C |

Source: Serie BKT
Rules for classification: 1) Points; 2) Head-to-head points; 3) Head-to-head goal difference; 4) Goal difference; 5) Goals scored; 6) Draw.
(Note: Head-to-head record is used only after all the matches between the teams in question have been played)
(C) Champions; (E) Eliminated; (O) Play-off winners; (P) Promoted; (R) Relegated

==== Serie C ====
Group A (North)

| Pos | Team | Pld | Pts |
|---|---|---|---|
| 1 | Padova (C, P) | 38 | 86 |
| 2 | Vicenza | 38 | 83 |
| 3 | Feralpisalò | 38 | 72 |
| 4 | AlbinoLeffe | 38 | 60 |
| 5 | Renate | 38 | 60 |
| 6 | Giana Erminio | 38 | 57 |
| 7 | Trento | 38 | 57 |
| 8 | Atalanta U23 | 38 | 57 |
| 9 | Virtus Verona | 38 | 56 |
| 10 | Arzignano | 38 | 53 |
| 11 | Novara | 38 | 52 |
| 12 | Alcione Milano | 38 | 47 |
| 13 | Lecco | 38 | 43 |
| 14 | Pergolettese | 38 | 42 |
| 15 | Lumezzane | 38 | 42 |
| 16 | Triestina (O) | 38 | 39 |
| 17 | Pro Vercelli (O) | 38 | 37 |
| 18 | Pro Patria (T) | 38 | 34 |
| 19 | Caldiero Terme (R) | 38 | 33 |
| 20 | Union Clodiense Chioggia (R) | 38 | 21 |

Source: Lega Pro, Soccerway (in English)
(C) Champions;
(O) Play-off winners;
(P) Promoted;
(R) Relegated;
(T) Qualified, but not yet for the particular phase indicated
Group B (Centre)

| Pos | Team | Pld | Pts |
|---|---|---|---|
| 1 | Virtus Entella (P) | 38 | 83 |
| 2 | Ternana | 38 | 74 |
| 3 | Torres | 38 | 68 |
| 4 | Pescara (O, P) | 38 | 67 |
| 5 | Arezzo | 38 | 62 |
| 6 | Vis Pesaro | 38 | 58 |
| 7 | Pineto | 38 | 57 |
| 8 | Pianese | 38 | 54 |
| 9 | Rimini | 38 | 51 |
| 10 | Pontedera | 38 | 48 |
| 11 | Gubbio | 38 | 48 |
| 12 | Perugia | 38 | 47 |
| 13 | Carpi | 38 | 44 |
| 14 | Campobasso | 38 | 43 |
| 15 | Ascoli | 38 | 40 |
| 16 | Lucchese (E, R, R) | 38 | 39 |
| 17 | SPAL (O) | 38 | 35 |
| 18 | Milan Futuro (R) | 38 | 34 |
| 19 | Sestri Levante (R) | 38 | 31 |
| 20 | Legnago (R) | 38 | 29 |

Source: Lega Pro, Soccerway (in English)
(E) Eliminated;
(O) Play-off winners;
(P) Promoted;
(R) Relegated
Group C (South)

| Pos | Team | Pld | Pts |
|---|---|---|---|
| 1 | Avellino (C, P) | 34 | 75 |
| 2 | Audace Cerignola | 34 | 67 |
| 3 | Monopoli | 34 | 57 |
| 4 | Crotone | 34 | 54 |
| 5 | Catania | 34 | 53 |
| 6 | Benevento | 34 | 52 |
| 7 | Potenza | 34 | 49 |
| 8 | Picerno | 34 | 48 |
| 9 | Juventus Next Gen | 34 | 44 |
| 10 | Giugliano | 34 | 43 |
| 11 | Trapani | 34 | 41 |
| 12 | Cavese | 34 | 41 |
| 13 | Team Altamura | 34 | 37 |
| 14 | Sorrento | 34 | 35 |
| 15 | Latina | 34 | 34 |
| 16 | Casertana | 34 | 32 |
| 17 | Foggia (O) | 34 | 31 |
| 18 | Messina (R) | 34 | 25 |
| 19 | Turris (D, R, R) | 0 | 0 |
| 20 | Taranto (D, R, R) | 0 | 0 |

Source: Lega Pro, Soccerway (in English)
(C) Champions;
(D) Disqualified;
(O) Play-off winners;
(P) Promoted;
(R) Relegated

=== Women ===
==== Serie A (women) ====
| Pos | Team | Pld | W | D | L | GF | GA | GD | Pts | Qualification |
|---|---|---|---|---|---|---|---|---|---|---|
| 1 | Juventus | 18 | 14 | 3 | 1 | 51 | 16 | +35 | 45 | Advanced to the championship round |
| 2 | Inter Milan | 18 | 11 | 5 | 2 | 34 | 14 | +20 | 38 | Advanced to the championship round |
| 3 | Roma | 18 | 10 | 5 | 3 | 36 | 20 | +16 | 35 | Advanced to the championship round |
| 4 | Fiorentina | 18 | 8 | 4 | 6 | 24 | 24 | 0 | 28 | Advanced to the championship round |
| 5 | Milan | 18 | 7 | 4 | 7 | 25 | 28 | −3 | 25 | Advanced to the championship round |
| 6 | Como | 18 | 7 | 1 | 10 | 25 | 32 | −7 | 22 | Participates in the relegation round |
| 7 | Lazio | 18 | 5 | 5 | 8 | 29 | 28 | +1 | 20 | Participates in the relegation round |
| 8 | Sassuolo | 18 | 5 | 4 | 9 | 29 | 34 | −5 | 19 | Participates in the relegation round |
| 9 | Napoli | 18 | 2 | 4 | 12 | 10 | 34 | −24 | 10 | Participates in the relegation round |
| 10 | Sampdoria | 18 | 1 | 5 | 12 | 8 | 41 | −33 | 8 | Participates in the relegation round |

Source: FIGC.it
Rules for classification: Tiebreakers

===== Championship round =====
The points and scores from the regular season carry over to the championship round.

| Pos | Team | Pld | W | D | L | GF | GA | GD | Pts | Qualification |
|---|---|---|---|---|---|---|---|---|---|---|
| 1 | Juventus (C) | 26 | 17 | 4 | 5 | 64 | 31 | +33 | 55 | Qualification for the Champions League league phase |
| 2 | Inter Milan | 26 | 15 | 6 | 5 | 50 | 26 | +24 | 51 | Qualification for the Champions League second qualifying round |
| 3 | Roma | 26 | 13 | 6 | 7 | 49 | 36 | +13 | 45 | Qualification for the Champions League second qualifying round |
| 4 | Fiorentina | 26 | 12 | 5 | 9 | 36 | 34 | +2 | 41 | |
| 5 | Milan | 26 | 9 | 8 | 9 | 42 | 46 | −4 | 35 | |

Source: FIGC.it
Rules for classification: Tiebreakers
(C) Champions

===== Relegation round =====
The points and scores from the regular season carry over to the relegation round.

| Pos | Team | Pld | W | D | L | GF | GA | GD | Pts | Relegation |
|---|---|---|---|---|---|---|---|---|---|---|
| 1 | Lazio | 26 | 12 | 5 | 9 | 52 | 31 | +21 | 41 | |
| 2 | Como | 26 | 12 | 2 | 12 | 39 | 43 | −4 | 38 | |
| 3 | Sassuolo | 26 | 10 | 4 | 12 | 45 | 49 | −4 | 34 | |
| 4 | Napoli | 26 | 3 | 5 | 18 | 15 | 50 | −35 | 14 | |
| 5 | Sampdoria (R) | 26 | 1 | 7 | 18 | 16 | 62 | −46 | 10 | Relegation to 2025–26 Serie B |

Source: FIGC.it
Rules for classification: Tiebreakers
(R) Relegated

== Cup competitions ==
=== Men ===
==== Coppa Italia ====
===== Final =====
14 May 2025
21:00 CEST

| Milan | 0–1 | Bologna |
|---|---|---|
| | Report | Ndoye 53' |

Stadio Olimpico, Rome
Attendance: 68,490
Referee: Maurizio Mariani

==== Supercoppa Italiana ====
Semi-finals
2 January 2025 – Riyadh
Inter Milan | 2
Atalanta | 0
3 January 2025 – Riyadh
Juventus | 1
AC Milan | 2

Final
6 January 2025 – Riyadh
Inter Milan | 2
AC Milan | 3

===== Final =====
6 January 2025
22:00

| Inter Milan | 2–3 | AC Milan |
|---|---|---|
| L. Martínez 45+1'; Taremi 47' | Report | Hernandez 52'; Pulisic 80'; Abraham 90+3' |

King Saud University Stadium, Riyadh
Attendance: 24,841
Referee: Simone Sozza

=== Women ===
==== Coppa Italia ====
17 May 2025
18:00 CEST (UTC+2)

| Juventus | 4–0 | AS Roma |
|---|---|---|
| Girelli 13' (pen.), 34'; Cantore 21'; Thomas 30' |

Stadio Giuseppe Sinigaglia
Attendance: 7,064
Referee: Andrea Colombo

==== Supercoppa Italiana ====
6 January 2025
15:30 CET (UTC+1)

| Roma | 3–1 | Fiorentina |
|---|---|---|
| Glionna 17'; Giacinti 64'; Corelli 89' | Report | Janogy 60' |

Stadio Alberto Picco, La Spezia
Referee: Silvia Gasperotti

== International competitions ==
=== FIFA Club World Cup ===
==== Group E ====
| Pos | Team | Pld | W | D | L | GF | GA | GD | Pts | Qualification |
|---|---|---|---|---|---|---|---|---|---|---|
| 1 | (Italy) Inter Milan | 3 | 2 | 1 | 0 | 5 | 2 | +3 | 7 | Advance to knockout stage |
| 2 | (Mexico) Monterrey | 3 | 1 | 2 | 0 | 5 | 1 | +4 | 5 | Advance to knockout stage |
| 3 | (Argentina) River Plate | 3 | 1 | 1 | 1 | 3 | 3 | 0 | 4 | |
| 4 | (Japan) Urawa Red Diamonds | 3 | 0 | 0 | 3 | 2 | 9 | −7 | 0 | |

Source: FIFA

==== Group G ====
| Pos | Team | Pld | W | D | L | GF | GA | GD | Pts | Qualification |
|---|---|---|---|---|---|---|---|---|---|---|
| 1 | (England) Manchester City | 3 | 3 | 0 | 0 | 13 | 2 | +11 | 9 | Advance to knockout stage |
| 2 | (Italy) Juventus | 3 | 2 | 0 | 1 | 11 | 6 | +5 | 6 | Advance to knockout stage |
| 3 | (United Arab Emirates) Al Ain | 3 | 1 | 0 | 2 | 2 | 12 | −10 | 3 | |
| 4 | (Morocco) Wydad AC | 3 | 0 | 0 | 3 | 2 | 8 | −6 | 0 | |

Source: FIFA

==== Knockout stage ====
===== Round of 16 =====
| 30 June 2025 | Inter Milan (Italy) | 0–2 | (Brazil) Fluminense | Charlotte, United States |
| 3:00 pm EDT | | Report | Cano 3'; Hércules 90+3' | Stadium: Bank of America Stadium; Attendance: 20,030; Referee: Iván Barton (El Salvador) |

== UEFA competitions ==
=== UEFA Super Cup ===
14 August 2024
21:00 UTC+2

| Real Madrid (Spain) | 2–0 | (Italy) Atalanta |
|---|---|---|
| Valverde 59'; Mbappé 68' | Report |

National Stadium, Warsaw
Attendance: 56,042
Referee: Sandro Schärer (Switzerland)

=== UEFA Champions League ===
==== League phase ====
===== Atalanta =====
| Pos | Team | Pld | W | D | L | GF | GA | GD | Pts | Qualification |
|---|---|---|---|---|---|---|---|---|---|---|
| 7 | (French Football Federation) Lille | 8 | 5 | 1 | 2 | 17 | 10 | +7 | 16 | Advance to round of 16 (seeded) |
| 8 | (The Football Association) Aston Villa | 8 | 5 | 1 | 2 | 13 | 6 | +7 | 16 | Advance to round of 16 (seeded) |
| 9 | (Italian Football Federation) Atalanta | 8 | 4 | 3 | 1 | 20 | 6 | +14 | 15 | Advance to knockout phase play-offs (seeded) |
| 10 | (German Football Association) Borussia Dortmund | 8 | 5 | 0 | 3 | 22 | 12 | +10 | 15 | Advance to knockout phase play-offs (seeded) |
| 11 | (Royal Spanish Football Federation) Real Madrid | 8 | 5 | 0 | 3 | 20 | 12 | +8 | 15 (Note: Tied on points (15), goal difference (+8), goals scored (20), away goals (6) and wins (5). Ranked on away wins: Real Madrid 2, Bayern Munich 1.) | Advance to knockout phase play-offs (seeded) |

Source: UEFA
Rules for classification: League phase tiebreakers
Notes:

| Home team | Score | Away team |
|---|---|---|
| Atalanta (Italy) | 0–0 | (England) Arsenal |
| Shakhtar Donetsk (Ukraine) | 0–3 | (Italy) Atalanta |
| Atalanta (Italy) | 0–0 | (Scotland) Celtic |
| VfB Stuttgart (Germany) | 0–2 | (Italy) Atalanta |
| Young Boys (Switzerland) | 1–6 | (Italy) Atalanta |
| Atalanta (Italy) | 2–3 | (Spain) Real Madrid |
| Atalanta (Italy) | 5–0 | (Austria) Sturm Graz |
| Barcelona (Spain) | 2–2 | (Italy) Atalanta |

===== Bologna =====
| Pos | Team | Pld | W | D | L | GF | GA | GD | Pts |
|---|---|---|---|---|---|---|---|---|---|
| 26 | (German Football Association) VfB Stuttgart | 8 | 3 | 1 | 4 | 13 | 17 | −4 | 10 |
| 27 | (Ukrainian Association of Football) Shakhtar Donetsk | 8 | 2 | 1 | 5 | 8 | 16 | −8 | 7 |
| 28 | (Italian Football Federation) Bologna | 8 | 1 | 3 | 4 | 4 | 9 | −5 | 6 |
| 29 | (Football Association of Serbia) Red Star Belgrade | 8 | 2 | 0 | 6 | 13 | 22 | −9 | 6 |
| 30 | (Austrian Football Association) Sturm Graz | 8 | 2 | 0 | 6 | 5 | 14 | −9 | 6 |

Source: UEFA
Rules for classification: League phase tiebreakers

| Home team | Score | Away team |
|---|---|---|
| Bologna (Italy) | 0–0 | (Ukraine) Shakhtar Donetsk |
| Liverpool (England) | 2–0 | (Italy) Bologna |
| Aston Villa (England) | 2–0 | (Italy) Bologna |
| Bologna (Italy) | 0–1 | (France) Monaco |
| Bologna (Italy) | 1–2 | (France) Lille |
| Benfica (Portugal) | 0–0 | (Italy) Bologna |
| Bologna (Italy) | 2–1 | (Germany) Borussia Dortmund |
| Sporting CP (Portugal) | 1–1 | (Italy) Bologna |

===== Inter Milan =====
| Pos | Team | Pld | W | D | L | GF | GA | GD | Pts | Qualification |
|---|---|---|---|---|---|---|---|---|---|---|
| 2 | (Royal Spanish Football Federation) Barcelona | 8 | 6 | 1 | 1 | 28 | 13 | +15 | 19 | Advance to round of 16 (seeded) |
| 3 | (The Football Association) Arsenal | 8 | 6 | 1 | 1 | 16 | 3 | +13 | 19 | Advance to round of 16 (seeded) |
| 4 | (Italian Football Federation) Inter Milan | 8 | 6 | 1 | 1 | 11 | 1 | +10 | 19 | Advance to round of 16 (seeded) |
| 5 | (Royal Spanish Football Federation) Atlético Madrid | 8 | 6 | 0 | 2 | 20 | 12 | +8 | 18 | Advance to round of 16 (seeded) |
| 6 | (German Football Association) Bayer Leverkusen | 8 | 5 | 1 | 2 | 15 | 7 | +8 | 16 | Advance to round of 16 (seeded) |

Source: UEFA
Rules for classification: League phase tiebreakers

| Home team | Score | Away team |
|---|---|---|
| Manchester City (England) | 0–0 | (Italy) Inter Milan |
| Inter Milan (Italy) | 4–0 | (Serbia) Red Star Belgrade |
| Young Boys (Switzerland) | 0–1 | (Italy) Inter Milan |
| Inter Milan (Italy) | 1–0 | (England) Arsenal |
| Inter Milan (Italy) | 1–0 | (Germany) RB Leipzig |
| Bayer Leverkusen (Germany) | 1–0 | (Italy) Inter Milan |
| Sparta Prague (Czech Republic) | 0–1 | (Italy) Inter Milan |
| Inter Milan (Italy) | 3–0 | (France) Monaco |

===== Juventus =====
| Pos | Team | Pld | W | D | L | GF | GA | GD | Pts | Qualification |
|---|---|---|---|---|---|---|---|---|---|---|
| 18 | (French Football Federation) Brest | 8 | 4 | 1 | 3 | 10 | 11 | −1 | 13 | Advance to knockout phase play-offs (unseeded) |
| 19 | (Royal Dutch Football Association) Feyenoord | 8 | 4 | 1 | 3 | 18 | 21 | −3 | 13 | Advance to knockout phase play-offs (unseeded) |
| 20 | (Italian Football Federation) Juventus | 8 | 3 | 3 | 2 | 9 | 7 | +2 | 12 | Advance to knockout phase play-offs (unseeded) |
| 21 | (Scottish Football Association) Celtic | 8 | 3 | 3 | 2 | 13 | 14 | −1 | 12 | Advance to knockout phase play-offs (unseeded) |
| 22 | (The Football Association) Manchester City | 8 | 3 | 2 | 3 | 18 | 14 | +4 | 11 | Advance to knockout phase play-offs (unseeded) |

Source: UEFA
Rules for classification: League phase tiebreakers

| Home team | Score | Away team |
|---|---|---|
| Juventus (Italy) | 3–1 | (Netherlands) PSV Eindhoven |
| RB Leipzig (Germany) | 2–3 | (Italy) Juventus |
| Juventus (Italy) | 0–1 | (Germany) VfB Stuttgart |
| Lille (France) | 1–1 | (Italy) Juventus |
| Aston Villa (England) | 0–0 | (Italy) Juventus |
| Juventus (Italy) | 2–0 | (England) Manchester City |
| Club Brugge (Belgium) | 0–0 | (Italy) Juventus |
| Juventus (Italy) | 0–2 | (Portugal) Benfica |

===== Milan =====
| Pos | Team | Pld | W | D | L | GF | GA | GD | Pts | Qualification |
|---|---|---|---|---|---|---|---|---|---|---|
| 11 | (Royal Spanish Football Federation) Real Madrid | 8 | 5 | 0 | 3 | 20 | 12 | +8 | 15 (Note: Tied on points (15), goal difference (+8), goals scored (20), away goals (6) and wins (5). Ranked on away wins: Real Madrid 2, Bayern Munich 1.) | Advance to knockout phase play-offs (seeded) |
| 12 | (German Football Association) Bayern Munich | 8 | 5 | 0 | 3 | 20 | 12 | +8 | 15 | Advance to knockout phase play-offs (seeded) |
| 13 | (Italian Football Federation) Milan | 8 | 5 | 0 | 3 | 14 | 11 | +3 | 15 | Advance to knockout phase play-offs (seeded) |
| 14 | (Royal Dutch Football Association) PSV Eindhoven | 8 | 4 | 2 | 2 | 16 | 12 | +4 | 14 | Advance to knockout phase play-offs (seeded) |
| 15 | (French Football Federation) Paris Saint-Germain | 8 | 4 | 1 | 3 | 14 | 9 | +5 | 13 | Advance to knockout phase play-offs (seeded) |

Source: UEFA
Rules for classification: League phase tiebreakers
Notes:

| Home team | Score | Away team |
|---|---|---|
| Milan (Italy) | 1–3 | (England) Liverpool |
| Bayer Leverkusen (Germany) | 1–0 | (Italy) Milan |
| Milan (Italy) | 3–1 | (Belgium) Club Brugge |
| Real Madrid (Spain) | 1–3 | (Italy) Milan |
| Slovan Bratislava (Slovakia) | 2–3 | (Italy) Milan |
| Milan (Italy) | 2–1 | (Serbia) Red Star Belgrade |
| Milan (Italy) | 1–0 | (Spain) Girona |
| Dinamo Zagreb (Croatia) | 2–1 | (Italy) Milan |

==== Knockout phase ====
===== Knockout phase play-offs =====
| Team 1 | Agg. | Team 2 | 1st leg | 2nd leg |
|---|---|---|---|---|
| Club Brugge (Belgium) | 5–2 | (Italy) Atalanta | 2–1 | 3–1 |
| Juventus (Italy) | 3–4 | (Netherlands) PSV Eindhoven | 2–1 | 1–3 (a.e.t.) |
| Feyenoord (Netherlands) | 2–1 | (Italy) Milan | 1–0 | 1–1 |

===== Round of 16 =====
| Team 1 | Agg. | Team 2 | 1st leg | 2nd leg |
|---|---|---|---|---|
| Feyenoord (Netherlands) | 1–4 | (Italy) Inter Milan | 0–2 | 1–2 |

===== Quarter-finals =====
| Team 1 | Agg. | Team 2 | 1st leg | 2nd leg |
|---|---|---|---|---|
| Bayern Munich (Germany) | 3–4 | (Italy) Inter Milan | 1–2 | 2–2 |

===== Semi–Finals =====
| Team 1 | Agg. | Team 2 | 1st leg | 2nd leg |
|---|---|---|---|---|
| Barcelona (Spain) | 6–7 | (Italy) Inter Milan | 3–3 | 3–4 (a.e.t.) |

===== Final =====
31 May 2025
21:00 UTC+2

| Paris Saint-Germain (France) | 5–0 | (Italy) Inter Milan |
|---|---|---|
| Hakimi 12'; Doué 20', 63'; Kvaratskhelia 73'; Mayulu 86' | Report |

Allianz Arena, Munich
Attendance: 64,327
Referee: István Kovács (Romania)

=== UEFA Europa League ===
==== League phase ====
===== Lazio =====
| Pos | Team | Pld | W | D | L | GF | GA | GD | Pts | Qualification |
|---|---|---|---|---|---|---|---|---|---|---|
| 1 | (Italian Football Federation) Lazio | 8 | 6 | 1 | 1 | 17 | 5 | +12 | 19 | Advance to round of 16 (seeded) |
| 2 | (Royal Spanish Football Federation) Athletic Bilbao | 8 | 6 | 1 | 1 | 15 | 7 | +8 | 19 | Advance to round of 16 (seeded) |
| 3 | (The Football Association) Manchester United | 8 | 5 | 3 | 0 | 16 | 9 | +7 | 18 | Advance to round of 16 (seeded) |
| 4 | (The Football Association) Tottenham Hotspur | 8 | 5 | 2 | 1 | 17 | 9 | +8 | 17 | Advance to round of 16 (seeded) |
| 5 | (German Football Association) Eintracht Frankfurt | 8 | 5 | 1 | 2 | 14 | 10 | +4 | 16 | Advance to round of 16 (seeded) |

Source: UEFA
Rules for classification: League phase tiebreakers

| Home team | Score | Away team |
|---|---|---|
| Dynamo Kyiv (Ukraine) | 0–3 | (Italy) Lazio |
| Lazio (Italy) | 4–1 | (France) Nice |
| Twente (Netherlands) | 0–2 | (Italy) Lazio |
| Lazio (Italy) | 2–1 | (Portugal) Porto |
| Lazio (Italy) | 0–0 | (Bulgaria) Ludogorets Razgrad |
| Ajax (Netherlands) | 1–3 | (Italy) Lazio |
| Lazio (Italy) | 3–1 | (Spain) Real Sociedad |
| Braga (Portugal) | 1–0 | (Italy) Lazio |

===== Roma =====
| Pos | Team | Pld | W | D | L | GF | GA | GD | Pts | Qualification |
|---|---|---|---|---|---|---|---|---|---|---|
| 13 | (Royal Spanish Football Federation) Real Sociedad | 8 | 4 | 1 | 3 | 13 | 9 | +4 | 13 | Advance to knockout phase play-offs (seeded) |
| 14 | (Turkish Football Federation) Galatasaray | 8 | 3 | 4 | 1 | 19 | 16 | +3 | 13 | Advance to knockout phase play-offs (seeded) |
| 15 | (Italian Football Federation) Roma | 8 | 3 | 3 | 2 | 10 | 6 | +4 | 12 | Advance to knockout phase play-offs (seeded) |
| 16 | (Football Association of the Czech Republic) Viktoria Plzeň | 8 | 3 | 3 | 2 | 13 | 12 | +1 | 12 | Advance to knockout phase play-offs (seeded) |
| 17 | (Hungarian Football Federation) Ferencváros | 8 | 4 | 0 | 4 | 15 | 15 | 0 | 12 | Advance to knockout phase play-offs (unseeded) |

Source: UEFA
Rules for classification: League phase tiebreakers

| Home team | Score | Away team |
|---|---|---|
| Roma (Italy) | 1–1 | (Spain) Athletic Bilbao |
| IF Elfsborg (Sweden) | 1–0 | (Italy) Roma |
| Roma (Italy) | 1–0 | (Ukraine) Dynamo Kyiv |
| Union Saint-Gilloise (Belgium) | 1–1 | (Italy) Roma |
| Tottenham Hotspur (England) | 2–2 | (Italy) Roma |
| Roma (Italy) | 3–0 | (Portugal) Braga |
| AZ (Netherlands) | 1–0 | (Italy) Roma |
| Roma (Italy) | 2–0 | (Germany) Eintracht Frankfurt |

==== Knockout phase ====
===== Knockout phase play-offs =====
| Team 1 | Agg. | Team 2 | 1st leg | 2nd leg |
|---|---|---|---|---|
| Porto (Portugal) | 3–4 | (Italy) Roma | 1–1 | 2–3 |

===== Round of 16 =====
| Team 1 | Agg. | Team 2 | 1st leg | 2nd leg |
|---|---|---|---|---|
| Viktoria Plzeň (Czech Republic) | 2–3 | (Italy) Lazio | 1–2 | 1–1 |
| Roma (Italy) | 3–4 | (Spain) Athletic Bilbao | 2–1 | 1–3 |

===== Quarter-finals =====
| Team 1 | Agg. | Team 2 | 1st leg | 2nd leg |
|---|---|---|---|---|
| Bodø/Glimt (Norway) | 3–3 (3–2 p) | (Italy) Lazio | 2–0 | 1–3 (a.e.t.) |

=== UEFA Conference League ===
==== Qualifying phase and play-off round ====
===== Play-off round =====
| Team 1 | Agg. | Team 2 | 1st leg | 2nd leg |
|---|---|---|---|---|
| Fiorentina (Italy) | 4–4 (5–4 p) | (Hungary) Puskás Akadémia | 3–3 | 1–1 |

==== League phase ====
===== Fiorentina =====
| Pos | Team | Pld | W | D | L | GF | GA | GD | Pts | Qualification |
|---|---|---|---|---|---|---|---|---|---|---|
| 1 | (The Football Association) Chelsea | 6 | 6 | 0 | 0 | 26 | 5 | +21 | 18 | Advance to round of 16 (seeded) |
| 2 | (Portuguese Football Federation) Vitória de Guimarães | 6 | 4 | 2 | 0 | 13 | 6 | +7 | 14 | Advance to round of 16 (seeded) |
| 3 | (Italian Football Federation) Fiorentina | 6 | 4 | 1 | 1 | 18 | 7 | +11 | 13 | Advance to round of 16 (seeded) |
| 4 | (Austrian Football Association) Rapid Wien | 6 | 4 | 1 | 1 | 11 | 5 | +6 | 13 | Advance to round of 16 (seeded) |
| 5 | (Swedish Football Association) Djurgårdens IF | 6 | 4 | 1 | 1 | 11 | 7 | +4 | 13 (Note: Away goals scored: Djurgårdens IF 5, Lugano 4.) | Advance to round of 16 (seeded) |

Source: UEFA
Rules for classification: League phase tiebreakers
Notes:

| Home team | Score | Away team |
|---|---|---|
| Fiorentina (Italy) | 2–0 | (Wales) The New Saints |
| St. Gallen (Switzerland) | 2–4 | (Italy) Fiorentina |
| APOEL (Cyprus) | 2–1 | (Italy) Fiorentina |
| Fiorentina (Italy) | 3–2 | (Cyprus) Pafos |
| Fiorentina (Italy) | 7–0 | (Austria) LASK |
| Vitória de Guimarães (Portugal) | 1–1 | (Italy) Fiorentina |

==== Knockout phase ====
===== Round of 16 =====
| Team 1 | Agg. | Team 2 | 1st leg | 2nd leg |
|---|---|---|---|---|
| Panathinaikos (Greece) | 4–5 | (Italy) Fiorentina | 3–2 | 1–3 |

===== Quarter-finals =====
| Team 1 | Agg. | Team 2 | 1st leg | 2nd leg |
|---|---|---|---|---|
| Celje (Slovenia) | 3–4 | (Italy) Fiorentina | 1–2 | 2–2 |

===== Semi-finals =====
| Team 1 | Agg. | Team 2 | 1st leg | 2nd leg |
|---|---|---|---|---|
| Real Betis (Spain) | 4–3 | (Italy) Fiorentina | 2–1 | 2–2 (a.e.t.) |

=== UEFA Women's Champions League ===
==== Qualifying rounds ====
===== Round 1 =====
====== Semi-finals ======
| Team 1 | Score | Team 2 |
|---|---|---|
| Brøndby (Denmark) | 0–1 | (Italy) Fiorentina |

====== Final ======
| Team 1 | Score | Team 2 |
|---|---|---|
| Ajax (Netherlands) | 0–1 | (Italy) Fiorentina |

===== Round 2 =====
| Team 1 | Agg. | Team 2 | 1st leg | 2nd leg |
|---|---|---|---|---|
| Roma (Italy) | 10–3 | (Switzerland) Servette | 3–1 | 7–2 |
| Juventus (Italy) | 5–2 | (France) Paris Saint-Germain | 3–1 | 2–1 |
| Fiorentina (Italy) | 0–12 | (Germany) VfL Wolfsburg | 0–7 | 0–5 |

==== Group stage ====
===== Group A =====
| Pos | Team | Pld | W | D | L | GF | GA | GD | Pts | Qualification | LYO | WOL | ROM | GAL |
|---|---|---|---|---|---|---|---|---|---|---|---|---|---|---|
| 1 | (France) Lyon | 6 | 6 | 0 | 0 | 19 | 1 | +18 | 18 | Advance to quarter-finals | — | 1–0 | 4–1 | 3–0 |
| 2 | (Germany) VfL Wolfsburg | 6 | 3 | 0 | 3 | 16 | 5 | +11 | 9 (Note: Wolfsburg 3 Pts, +4 GD; Roma 3 Pts, −4 GD.) | Advance to quarter-finals | 0–2 | — | 6–1 | 5–0 |
| 3 | (Italy) Roma | 6 | 3 | 0 | 3 | 12 | 14 | −2 | 9 | | 0–3 | 1–0 | — | 3–0 |
| 4 | (Turkey) Galatasaray | 6 | 0 | 0 | 6 | 1 | 28 | −27 | 0 | | 0–6 | 0–5 | 1–6 | — |

Source: UEFA
Rules for classification: Group stage tiebreakers

===== Group C =====
| Pos | Team | Pld | W | D | L | GF | GA | GD | Pts | Qualification | ARS | BAY | JUV | VÅL |
|---|---|---|---|---|---|---|---|---|---|---|---|---|---|---|
| 1 | (England) Arsenal | 6 | 5 | 0 | 1 | 17 | 9 | +8 | 15 | Advance to quarter-finals | — | 3–2 | 1–0 | 4–1 |
| 2 | (Germany) Bayern Munich | 6 | 4 | 1 | 1 | 17 | 6 | +11 | 13 | Advance to quarter-finals | 5–2 | — | 4–0 | 3–0 |
| 3 | (Italy) Juventus | 6 | 2 | 0 | 4 | 4 | 11 | −7 | 6 | | 0–4 | 0–2 | — | 3–0 |
| 4 | (Norway) Vålerenga | 6 | 0 | 1 | 5 | 3 | 15 | −12 | 1 | | 1–3 | 1–1 | 0–1 | — |

Source: UEFA
Rules for classification: Group stage tiebreakers

=== UEFA Youth League ===
==== UEFA Champions League Path ====
===== Atalanta =====
| Pos | Team | Pld | W | D | L | GF | GA | GD | Pts | Qualification |
|---|---|---|---|---|---|---|---|---|---|---|
| 5 | (German Football Association) VfB Stuttgart | 6 | 4 | 1 | 1 | 13 | 6 | +7 | 13 | Advance to knockout phase |
| 6 | (Royal Spanish Football Federation) Real Madrid | 6 | 4 | 0 | 2 | 10 | 5 | +5 | 12 | Advance to knockout phase |
| 7 | (Italian Football Federation) Atalanta | 6 | 4 | 0 | 2 | 14 | 12 | +2 | 12 | Advance to knockout phase |
| 8 | (Royal Spanish Football Federation) Atlético Madrid | 6 | 3 | 2 | 1 | 16 | 8 | +8 | 11 | Advance to knockout phase |
| 9 | (Portuguese Football Federation) Benfica | 6 | 3 | 2 | 1 | 12 | 7 | +5 | 11 | Advance to knockout phase |

Source: UEFA
Rules for classification: League phase tiebreakers

| Home team | Score | Away team |
|---|---|---|
| Atalanta (Italy) | 4–1 | (England) Arsenal |
| Shakhtar Donetsk (Ukraine) | 0–3 | (Italy) Atalanta |
| Atalanta (Italy) | 2–1 | (Scotland) Celtic |
| VfB Stuttgart (Germany) | 4–1 | (Italy) Atalanta |
| Young Boys (Switzerland) | 2–4 | (Italy) Atalanta |
| Atalanta (Italy) | 0–4 | (Spain) Real Madrid |

===== Bologna =====
| Pos | Team | Pld | W | D | L | GF | GA | GD | Pts |
|---|---|---|---|---|---|---|---|---|---|
| 31 | (Royal Belgian Football Association) Club Brugge | 6 | 0 | 3 | 3 | 5 | 11 | −6 | 3 |
| 32 | (German Football Association) RB Leipzig | 6 | 1 | 0 | 5 | 10 | 18 | −8 | 3 |
| 33 | (Italian Football Federation) Bologna | 6 | 0 | 2 | 4 | 7 | 14 | −7 | 2 |
| 34 | (French Football Federation) Brest | 6 | 0 | 2 | 4 | 5 | 16 | −11 | 2 |
| 35 | (Slovak Football Association) Slovan Bratislava | 6 | 0 | 2 | 4 | 6 | 20 | −14 | 2 |

Source: UEFA
Rules for classification: League phase tiebreakers

| Home team | Score | Away team |
|---|---|---|
| Bologna (Italy) | 3–4 | (Ukraine) Shakhtar Donetsk |
| Liverpool (England) | 2–1 | (Italy) Bologna |
| Aston Villa (England) | 3–1 | (Italy) Bologna |
| Bologna (Italy) | 0–0 | (France) Monaco |
| Bologna (Italy) | 2–2 | (France) Lille |
| Benfica (Portugal) | 3–0 | (Italy) Bologna |

===== Milan =====
| Pos | Team | Pld | W | D | L | GF | GA | GD | Pts |
|---|---|---|---|---|---|---|---|---|---|
| 25 | (Royal Dutch Football Association) PSV Eindhoven | 6 | 1 | 3 | 2 | 8 | 9 | −1 | 6 |
| 26 | (The Football Association) Arsenal | 6 | 2 | 0 | 4 | 5 | 12 | −7 | 6 |
| 27 | (Italian Football Federation) Milan | 6 | 1 | 2 | 3 | 7 | 11 | −4 | 5 (Note: Away goals scored: Milan 5; Red Star Belgrade 4.) |
| 28 | (Football Association of Serbia) Red Star Belgrade | 6 | 1 | 2 | 3 | 7 | 11 | −4 | 5 |
| 29 | (Royal Dutch Football Association) Feyenoord | 6 | 1 | 1 | 4 | 7 | 14 | −7 | 4 |

Source: UEFA
Rules for classification: League phase tiebreakers
Notes:

| Home team | Score | Away team |
|---|---|---|
| Milan (Italy) | 0–0 | (England) Liverpool |
| Bayer Leverkusen (Germany) | 3–1 | (Italy) Milan |
| Milan (Italy) | 22 Oct | (Belgium) Club Brugge |
| Real Madrid (Spain) | 2–1 | (Italy) Milan |
| Slovan Bratislava (Slovakia) | 2–3 | (Italy) Milan |
| Milan (Italy) | 1–3 | (Serbia) Red Star Belgrade |

===== Inter Milan =====
| Pos | Team | Pld | W | D | L | GF | GA | GD | Pts | Qualification |
|---|---|---|---|---|---|---|---|---|---|---|
| 1 | (Italian Football Federation) Inter Milan | 6 | 6 | 0 | 0 | 19 | 7 | +12 | 18 | Advance to knockout phase |
| 2 | (Portuguese Football Federation) Sporting CP | 6 | 5 | 1 | 0 | 13 | 3 | +10 | 16 | Advance to knockout phase |
| 3 | (Austrian Football Association) Red Bull Salzburg | 6 | 5 | 1 | 0 | 17 | 9 | +8 | 16 | Advance to knockout phase |
| 4 | (Royal Spanish Football Federation) Barcelona | 6 | 5 | 0 | 1 | 17 | 10 | +7 | 15 | Advance to knockout phase |
| 5 | (German Football Association) VfB Stuttgart | 6 | 4 | 1 | 1 | 13 | 6 | +7 | 13 | Advance to knockout phase |

Source: UEFA
Rules for classification: League phase tiebreakers

| Home team | Score | Away team |
|---|---|---|
| Manchester City (England) | 2–4 | (Italy) Inter Milan |
| Inter Milan (Italy) | 4–0 | (Serbia) Red Star Belgrade |
| Young Boys (Switzerland) | 2–3 | (Italy) Inter Milan |
| Inter Milan (Italy) | 4–1 | (England) Arsenal |
| Inter Milan (Italy) | 3–2 | (Germany) RB Leipzig |
| Bayer Leverkusen (Germany) | 0–1 | (Italy) Inter Milan |

===== Juventus =====
| Pos | Team | Pld | W | D | L | GF | GA | GD | Pts | Qualification |
|---|---|---|---|---|---|---|---|---|---|---|
| 8 | (Royal Spanish Football Federation) Atlético Madrid | 6 | 3 | 2 | 1 | 16 | 8 | +8 | 11 | Advance to knockout phase |
| 9 | (Portuguese Football Federation) Benfica | 6 | 3 | 2 | 1 | 12 | 7 | +5 | 11 | Advance to knockout phase |
| 10 | (Italian Football Federation) Juventus | 6 | 3 | 2 | 1 | 9 | 4 | +5 | 11 | Advance to knockout phase |
| 11 | (The Football Association) Manchester City | 6 | 3 | 1 | 2 | 16 | 8 | +8 | 10 | Advance to knockout phase |
| 12 | (Royal Spanish Football Federation) Girona | 6 | 2 | 4 | 0 | 9 | 5 | +4 | 10 | Advance to knockout phase |

Source: UEFA
Rules for classification: League phase tiebreakers

| Home team | Score | Away team |
|---|---|---|
| Juventus (Italy) | 1–0 | (Netherlands) PSV Eindhoven |
| RB Leipzig (Germany) | 0–3 | (Italy) Juventus |
| Juventus (Italy) | 2–3 | (Germany) VfB Stuttgart |
| Lille (France) | 0–0 | (Italy) Juventus |
| Aston Villa (England) | 0–2 | (Italy) Juventus |
| Juventus (Italy) | 1–1 | (England) Manchester City |

==== Domestic Champions Path ====
===== Second round =====
| Team 1 | Agg. | Team 2 | 1st leg | 2nd leg |
|---|---|---|---|---|
| Daugavpils (Latvia) | 0–9 | (Italy) Sassuolo | 0–5 | 0–4 |

===== Third round =====
| Team 1 | Agg. | Team 2 | 1st leg | 2nd leg |
|---|---|---|---|---|
| Real Betis (Spain) | 4–2 | (Italy) Sassuolo | 3–1 | 1–1 |

==== Knockout phase ====
===== Round of 32 =====
| Home team | Score | Away team |
|---|---|---|
| Inter Milan (Italy) | 3–1 | (France) Lille |
| Dynamo Kyiv (Ukraine) | 3–3 (6–7 p) | (Italy) Atalanta |
| Trabzonspor (Turkey) | 1–0 | (Italy) Juventus |

===== Round of 16 =====
| Home team | Score | Away team |
|---|---|---|
| Trabzonspor (Turkey) | 0–0 (5–3 p) | (Italy) Atalanta |
| Bayern Munich (Germany) | 1–1 (4–5 p) | (Italy) Inter Milan |

===== Quarter-finals =====
| Home team | Score | Away team |
|---|---|---|
| Trabzonspor (Turkey) | 1–0 | (Italy) Inter Milan |
