= 2025 UEFA Women's Champions League final =

- Match programme cover
- Event: 2024–25 UEFA Women's Champions League
Arsenal	Barcelona
(The Football Association)	(Royal Spanish Football Federation)
1	0
- Date: 24 May 2025
- Venue: Estádio José Alvalade, Lisbon
- Player of the Match: Stina Blackstenius (Arsenal)
- Referee: Ivana Martinčić (Croatia)
- Attendance: 38,356
- Weather: Sunny; 28 °C (82 °F); 37% humidity

The 2025 UEFA Women's Champions League final was the final match of the 2024–25 UEFA Women's Champions League, the 24th season of Europe's premier women's club football tournament organised by UEFA, and the 16th season since it was renamed from the UEFA Women's Cup to the UEFA Women's Champions League. The match was played at the Estádio José Alvalade in Lisbon, Portugal, on 24 May 2025, between English club Arsenal and Spanish club and title holders Barcelona.

Arsenal won the match 1–0 for their second UEFA Women's Cup/Champions League title and the first in 18 years. Arsenal also became the first team to begin in the first qualifying round and win the Champions League. As winners, Arsenal automatically qualified for the league phase (instead of the qualifying rounds) of the 2025–26 UEFA Women's Champions League, the 2026 FIFA Women's Champions Cup semi-finals and the 2028 FIFA Women's Club World Cup.

== Teams ==
In the following table, finals until 2009 were in the UEFA Women's Cup era, since 2010 were in the UEFA Women's Champions League era.

Team	Previous finals appearances (bold indicates winners)
(The Football Association) Arsenal	1 (**2007**)
(Royal Spanish Football Federation) Barcelona	5 (2019, **2021**, 2022, **2023**, **2024**)

Barcelona, having won the 2024–25 Liga F plus the Supercopa de España Femenina and reached the final of the Copa de la Reina de Fútbol, were seeking to retain their continental quadruple achieved the previous year.

This was the first Women's Champions League final featuring two clubs that had also met in a men's Champions League final; they clashed in 2006, in which Barcelona won 2–1.

== Venue ==
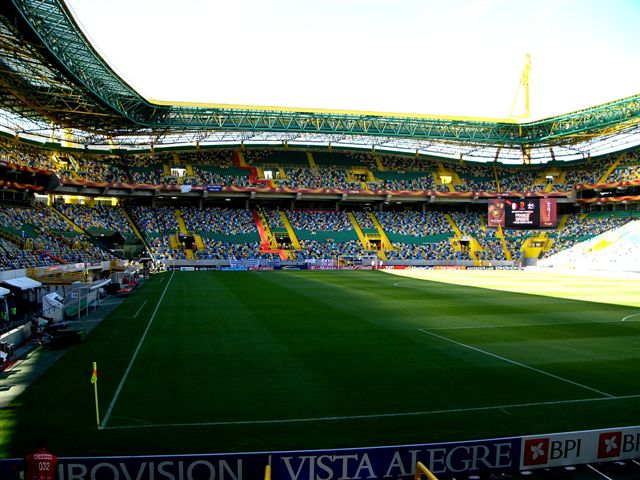
The Estádio José Alvalade in Lisbon hosted the final.

The match was the second UEFA final to be held at Lisbon's Estádio José Alvalade, following the men's 2005 UEFA Cup final. The stadium also hosted matches at UEFA Euro 2004. It is the second Women's Champions League final to be held in Portugal, after the 2014 final between Tyresö FF and VfL Wolfsburg, held at Lisbon's Estádio do Restelo.

=== Host selection ===
On 21 June 2022, UEFA opened the bidding process for the final. The proposed venues had to include natural grass and be ranked as a UEFA category four stadium, with a gross capacity of between 30,000 and 50,000 preferred. The bidding timeline was as follows:

- 21 June 2022: Applications formally invited
- 31 August 2022: Closing date for registering intention to bid
- 7 September 2022: Bid requirements made available to bidders
- 3 November 2022: Submission of preliminary bid dossier
- 23 February 2023: Submission of final bid dossier
- 29 June 2023: Appointment of host

The UEFA Executive Committee appointed the Estádio José Alvalade as the host during their meeting in Nyon, Switzerland, on 28 June 2023.

== Route to the final ==
Note: In all results below, the score of the finalist is given first (H: home; A: away).

(The Football Association) Arsenal				Round	(Royal Spanish Football Federation) Barcelona			
Opponent	Agg.	1st leg	2nd leg	Qualifying rounds	Bye			
(Scottish Football Association) Rangers	6–0 (H)			First qualifying round (SF)	Bye			
(Norwegian Football Federation) Rosenborg	1–0 (H)			First qualifying round (F)	Bye			
(Swedish Football Association) BK Häcken	4–1	0–1 (A)	4–0 (H)	Round 2	Bye			
Opponent	Result			Group stage	Opponent	Result		
(German Football Association) Bayern Munich	2–5 (A)			Matchday 1	(The Football Association) Manchester City	0–2 (A)		
(Norwegian Football Federation) Vålerenga	4–1 (H)			Matchday 2	(Swedish Football Association) Hammarby	9–0 (H)		
(Italian Football Federation) Juventus	4–0 (A)			Matchday 3	(Austrian Football Association) St. Pölten	7–0 (H)		
(Italian Football Federation) Juventus	1–0 (H)			Matchday 4	(Austrian Football Association) St. Pölten	4–1 (A)		
(Norwegian Football Federation) Vålerenga	3–1 (A)			Matchday 5	(Swedish Football Association) Hammarby	3–0 (A)		
(German Football Association) Bayern Munich	3–2 (H)			Matchday 6	(The Football Association) Manchester City	3–0 (H)		
**Group C winners**: Pos / Team / Pld / Pts; **1** / (England) Arsenal / **6** / **15**; 2 / (Germany) Bayern Munich / 6 / **13**; 3 / (Italy) Juventus / 6 / **6**; 4 / (Norway) Vålerenga / 6 / **1**; Source: UEFA				Final standings	**Group D winners**: Pos / Team / Pld / Pts; **1** / (Spain) Barcelona / **6** / **15**; 2 / (England) Manchester City / 6 / **15**; 3 / (Sweden) Hammarby / 6 / **6**; 4 / (Austria) St. Pölten / 6 / **0**; Source: UEFA			
Opponent	Agg.	1st leg	2nd leg	Knockout phase	Opponent	Agg.	1st leg	2nd leg
(Royal Spanish Football Federation) Real Madrid	3–2	0–2 (A)	3–0 (H)	Quarter-finals	(German Football Association) VfL Wolfsburg	10–2	4–1 (A)	6–1 (H)
(French Football Federation) Lyon	5–3	1–2 (H)	4–1 (A)	Semi-finals	(The Football Association) Chelsea	8–2	4–1 (H)	4–1 (A)

== Match ==
=== Summary ===
In the 9th minute, Barcelona forward Clàudia Pina went down after a challenge from Chloe Kelly. Pina complained to the referee and asked for a booking to be given to Kelly, however the referee decided that one was not deserved. One minute later, Barcelona had many chances to score in Arsenal's box but did not succeed. Aitana Bonmatí took a shot into Arsenal's net in the 12th minute, but was blocked by Kelly. In the 17th minute, Barcelona got a corner kick and Mapi León took it, they failed to score. In the 22nd minute, Irene Paredes of Barcelona scored an own goal, however it was ruled out by VAR due to an offside in the buildup to the goal. Midway through the first half, Barcelona started adding pressure to Arsenal's defenders. Another corner was then given to Barcelona in the 39th minute, but no goal occurred. A shot was taken by Pina in the 47th minute but it was saved by Daphne van Domselaar. She shot again two minutes later, but the ball bounced off the crossbar. Paredes was given a yellow card in the 50th minute for a slide against Caitlin Foord. Barcelona made a substitution in the 61st, Pina being removed and replaced by Salma Paralluelo. Frida Maanum of Arsenal was injured in the 67th minute and this led to Arsenal doing two substitutions, Stina Blackstenius for Manuum, and Beth Mead for Kelly. In the 74th minute, Mead passes to Blackstenius who scored the first goal of the game for Arsenal. The possibility of Blackstenius being offside was brought up, but it was shown to be untrue. Barcelona made a double substitution in the 80th minute, Ingrid Syrstad Engen and Esmee Brugts come on for León and Fridolina Rolfö, respectively. Bonmatí shot in the 84th minute, but it was blocked by Leah Williamson. Arsenal made a substitution in the 86th minute, with Lina Hurtig replacing Foord. In the 88th minute, Paralluelo was given a yellow card for hitting Mead's face. Three minutes later, Alessia Russo was taken off for Lotte Wubben-Moy. Barcelona took two shots before the game ended, but both failed to go in. Arsenal won the match 1-0 to win the final, while Blackstenius was given the Player of the Match award.

=== Details ===
The "home" team (for administrative purposes) was determined by an additional draw (after the quarter-final and semi-final draws), at the UEFA headquarters in Nyon, Switzerland.

24 May 2025
17:00 UTC+1

Arsenal (The Football Association)	1–0	(Royal Spanish Football Federation) Barcelona
Blackstenius 74'	Report

Estádio José Alvalade, Lisbon
Attendance: 38,356
Referee: Ivana Martinčić (Croatia)

**Arsenal**	**Barcelona**

GK	14	(Netherlands) Daphne van Domselaar
RB	2	(United States) Emily Fox
CB	6	(England) Leah Williamson
CB	7	(Australia) Steph Catley
LB	11	(Republic of Ireland) Katie McCabe
CM	10	(Scotland) Kim Little (c)
CM	12	(Norway) Frida Maanum		(substituted off) 67'
CM	8	(Spain) Mariona Caldentey
RF	18	(England) Chloe Kelly	(yellow card) 65'	(substituted off) 67'
CF	23	(England) Alessia Russo		(substituted off) 90+1'
LF	19	(Australia) Caitlin Foord		(substituted off) 86'
Substitutes:
GK	1	(Austria) Manuela Zinsberger
GK	40	(England) Naomi Williams
DF	3	(England) Lotte Wubben-Moy		(substituted on) 90+1'
DF	5	(Spain) Laia Codina
DF	22	(United States) Jenna Nighswonger
DF	28	(Sweden) Amanda Ilestedt
MF	13	(Switzerland) Lia Wälti
MF	21	(Netherlands) Victoria Pelova
MF	32	(Australia) Kyra Cooney-Cross
FW	9	(England) Beth Mead		(substituted on) 67'
FW	17	(Sweden) Lina Hurtig		(substituted on) 86'
FW	25	(Sweden) Stina Blackstenius		(substituted on) 67'
Manager:
(Netherlands) Renée Slegers

GK	13	(Spain) Cata Coll
RB	22	(Spain) Ona Batlle
CB	2	(Spain) Irene Paredes	(yellow card) 50'
CB	4	(Spain) Mapi León		(substituted off) 78'
LB	16	(Sweden) Fridolina Rolfö		(substituted off) 78'
CM	14	(Spain) Aitana Bonmatí
CM	12	(Spain) Patricia Guijarro
CM	11	(Spain) Alexia Putellas (c)
RF	10	(Norway) Caroline Graham Hansen
CF	17	(Poland) Ewa Pajor
LF	9	(Spain) Clàudia Pina	(yellow card) 87'	(substituted off) 62'
Substitutes:
GK	1	(Spain) Gemma Font
GK	25	(England) Ellie Roebuck
DF	5	(Spain) Jana Fernández
DF	8	(Spain) Marta Torrejón
DF	35	(Spain) Judit Pujols
MF	19	(Spain) Vicky López
MF	23	(Norway) Ingrid Syrstad Engen		(substituted on) 78'
MF	28	(Spain) Alba Caño
MF	34	(Spain) Clara Serrajordi
FW	7	(Spain) Salma Paralluelo	(yellow card) 88'	(substituted on) 62'
FW	24	(Netherlands) Esmee Brugts		(substituted on) 78'
FW	30	(Switzerland) Sydney Schertenleib
Manager:
(Spain) Pere Romeu

Player of the Match:
Stina Blackstenius (Arsenal)

Assistant referees:
Sanja Rođak-Karšić (Croatia)
Maja Petravić (Croatia)
Fourth official:
Ivana Projkovska (North Macedonia)
Reserve assistant referee:
Staša Špur (Slovenia)
Video assistant referee:
Tiago Martins (Portugal)
Assistant video assistant referee:
Momčilo Marković (Serbia)
Support video assistant referee:
Alen Borošak (Slovenia)

**Match rules**

- 90 minutes
- 30 minutes of extra time if necessary
- Penalty shoot-out if scores still level
- Maximum of twelve named substitutes
- Maximum of five substitutions, with a sixth allowed in extra time
- Maximum of three substitution opportunities, with a fourth allowed in extra time

=== Statistics ===
First half
Statistic	Arsenal	Barcelona
Goals scored	0	0
Total shots	4	6
Shots on target	1	1
Saves	1	1
Ball possession	45%	55%
Corner kicks	1	3
Fouls committed	0	4
Offsides	3	0
Yellow cards	0	0
Red cards	0	0

Second half
Statistic	Arsenal	Barcelona
Goals scored	1	0
Total shots	4	14
Shots on target	2	4
Saves	4	1
Ball possession	43%	57%
Corner kicks	1	9
Fouls committed	4	6
Offsides	1	0
Yellow cards	1	3
Red cards	0	0

Overall
Statistic	Arsenal	Barcelona
Goals scored	1	0
Total shots	8	20
Shots on target	3	5
Saves	5	2
Ball possession	44%	56%
Corner kicks	2	12
Fouls committed	4	10
Offsides	4	0
Yellow cards	1	3
Red cards	0	0

== See also ==
- 2024–25 Arsenal W.F.C. season
- 2024–25 FC Barcelona Femení season
- 2025 UEFA Champions League final
- 2025 UEFA Europa League final
- 2025 UEFA Conference League final
- 2025 UEFA Super Cup
