= Katie Reid (footballer) =

English footballer (born 2006)

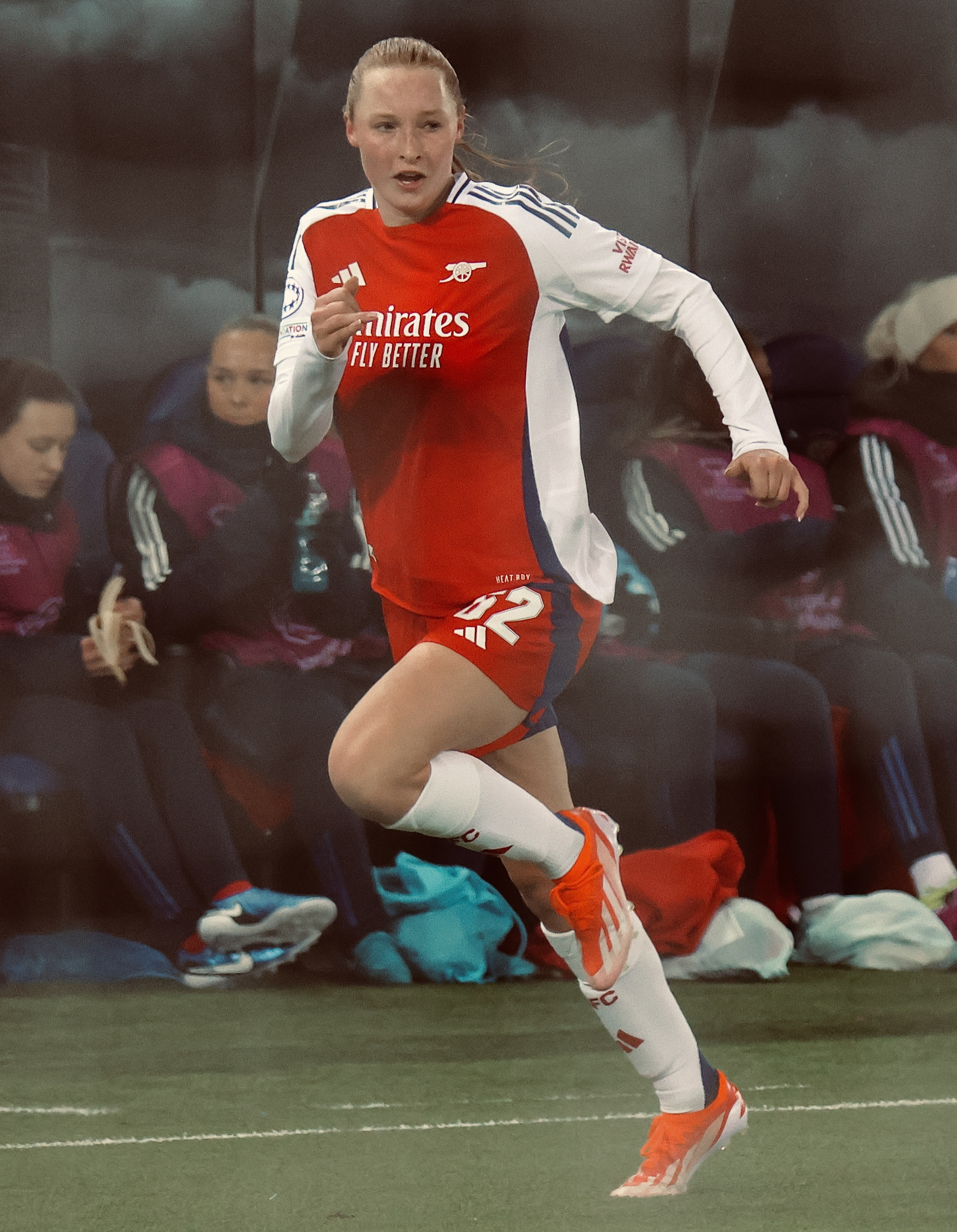
- Reid in 2024

Personal information
- Full name: Katie Holly Reid
- Date of birth: 25 September 2006 (age 20)
- Place of birth: England
- Position: Centre-back

Team information
- Current team: Arsenal
- Number: 26

Youth career
- Arsenal

Senior career*
Years	Team	Apps	(Gls)
2022–	Arsenal	14	(0)
2023–2024	→ Watford (loan)	10	(0)

International career^{‡}
2022–2023	England U17	10	(1)
2023–2025	England U19	8	(0)
2025–	England U23	2	(0)
2025–	England	0	(0)
- * Club domestic league appearances and goals as of 2 November 2025 ‡ National team caps and goals as of 30 May 2025

Katie Holly Reid (born 25 September 2006) is an English professional footballer who plays as a centre-back for Women's Super League club Arsenal and the England under-23 national team. She has grown to promenance with her performances for Arsenal, as well as visual appeal led to her also becoming a promenant ambassador for Adidas and she is one of the leading players Arsenal use for marketting for these reasons.

== Early life ==
Katie Reid started at Wycombe Wanderers Foundation before joining Reading FC’s RTC. Reid joined the Arsenal academy aged 13 after playing with the boys team. She began as a centre-back, full-back, and midfielder for the under-14s, before moving to centre-back with the under-16s.

Reid has a twin sister who also played football when they were younger. Reid cited summer football tournaments as one of her favourite childhood memories in an interview with The Telegraph, explaining that her twin sister played as well.

== Personal life ==
Reid has shared limited information about her personal life in public. She has describes herself as a bit awkward, a keen golfer and a nervous flyer. She also described alternative career trajectories as a golfer or a doctor, showing a playful and ambitious side to her. She has natural freckles and auburn hair.

== Club career ==
=== Arsenal ===
On 15 April 2024, Reid made her senior debut for Arsenal in a 5–0 win over Bristol City in the WSL, replacing Leah Williamson in the final minutes of the game. During the pre-season fixtures Reid featured in the 2024 A-Leagues All Stars Women match, described as a superb performance by Goal.com, who would anticipate a breakthrough during the 2024–25 season.

On 1 October 2024, she signed her first professional contract with Arsenal aged 18. On 16 October 2024, Reid made her Champions League debut, coming on as a substitute against Vålerenga. On 12 December, she made her first competitive start playing away at Vålerenga.

On 10 November 2025, it was announced Reid had ruptured her Anterior cruciate ligament (ACL) during training, and would be sidelined for the rest of the season, adding to the long list of players to have suffered the injury at the start of the season.

==== Watford (loan) ====
On 3 August 2023, Reid signed for Women's Championship club Watford on loan for the 2023-24 season.

Reid made 10 starts for Watford across all competitions, playing in 13 matches in total. On 14 January 2024, she featured in the FA Cup match against parent club Arsenal and was described by The Athletic as key in dealing with Arsenal's press in a tie that Watford lost 5–1.

== International career ==
Reid has represented the England under-17, under-19 and under-23 national teams.

In May 2023 she played in the 2023 UEFA Women's Under-17 Championship, conceding an own goal against Sweden in the group stage, followed by scoring her debut youth international goal, an equaliser against Spain in the semi-final, that the under-17s would eventually lose 3–1.

In July 2024, Reid featured in the 2024 UEFA Women's Under-19 Championship, where England again lost 3–1 to Spain in the semi-final.

In February 2025, Reid received her first call-up for England's under-23 team, making her debut in their friendly against Germany, which they lost 3–2.

In October 2025, Reid received her first call-up for the England senior team, but subsequently withdrew after a small groin-related injury.

== Playing style ==
Reid is a technical player who plays effectively in possession.

== Career statistics ==
=== Club ===
As of match played 2 November 2025

Appearances and goals by club, season and competition
Club	Season	League			National cup (Note: Include Women's FA Cup)		League cup (Note: Include Women's League Cup)		Continental (Note: Include UEFA Women's Champions League)		Total	
Club	Season	Division	Apps	Goals	Apps	Goals	Apps	Goals	Apps	Goals	Apps	Goals
Watford (loan)	2023–24	Women's Championship	10	0	1	0	2	0	—		13	0
Arsenal	2023–24	Women's Super League	1	0	—		—		—		1	0
Arsenal	2024–25	Women's Super League	7	0	2	0	1	0	3	0	13	0
Arsenal	2025–26	Women's Super League	6	0	0	0	0	0	1	0	7	0
Arsenal	Total		14	0	2	0	1	0	4	0	21	0
Career total			24	0	3	0	3	0	4	0	34	0

== Honours ==
Arsenal

- UEFA Women's Champions League: 2024–25
