= 2024–25 UEFA Women's Champions League knockout phase =

Tournament details
- Dates: 18 March – 24 May 2025
- Teams: 8

The 2024–25 UEFA Women's Champions League knockout phase began on 18 March 2025 with the quarter-finals and ended with the final on 24 May 2025 at the Estádio José Alvalade in Lisbon, Portugal, to decide the champions of the 2024–25 UEFA Women's Champions League.

== Schedule ==
The schedule of the competition was as follows (all draws were held at the UEFA headquarters in Nyon, Switzerland).

Round	Draw date	First leg	Second leg
Quarter-finals	7 February 2025	18–19 March 2025	26–27 March 2025
Semi-finals	7 February 2025	19–20 April 2025	27 April 2025
Final	7 February 2025	24 May 2025 at Estádio José Alvalade, Lisbon	

== Qualified teams ==
The knockout phase involved the eight teams which qualified as winners and runners-up of each of the four groups in the group stage.

Group	Winners (seeded in quarter finals draw)	Runners-up (unseeded in quarter finals draw)
A	(France) Lyon	(Germany) VfL Wolfsburg
B	(England) Chelsea	(Spain) Real Madrid
C	(England) Arsenal	(Germany) Bayern Munich
D	(Spain) Barcelona	(England) Manchester City

== Bracket ==
Quarter-finals
(Spain) Real Madrid	2	0	2
(England) Arsenal	0	3	3
(Germany) Bayern Munich	0	1	1
(France) Lyon	2	4	6
(Germany) VfL Wolfsburg	1	1	2
(Spain) Barcelona	4	6	10
(England) Manchester City	2	0	2
(England) Chelsea	0	3	3

Semi-finals
(England) Arsenal	1	4	5
(France) Lyon	2	1	3
(Spain) Barcelona	4	4	8
(England) Chelsea	1	1	2

Final
24 May – Lisbon
(England) Arsenal	1
(Spain) Barcelona	0

== Quarter-finals ==
The draw for the quarter-finals was held on 7 February 2025.

=== Summary ===
The first legs were played on 18 and 19 March, and the second legs on 26 and 27 March 2025.

Quarter-finals
Team 1	Agg.	Team 2	1st leg	2nd leg
Real Madrid (Spain)	2–3	(England) Arsenal	2–0	0–3
Bayern Munich (Germany)	1–6	(France) Lyon	0–2	1–4
VfL Wolfsburg (Germany)	2–10	(Spain) Barcelona	1–4	1–6
Manchester City (England)	2–3	(England) Chelsea	2–0	0–3

=== Matches ===
18 March 2025
18:45

Real Madrid (Spain)	2–0	(England) Arsenal
Caicedo 22'; Del Castillo 83'	Report

Alfredo Di Stéfano, Madrid
Attendance: 3,102
Referee: Frida Klarlund (Denmark)
26 March 2025
21:00 (20:00 UTC+0)

Arsenal (England)	3–0	(Spain) Real Madrid
Russo 46', 59'; Caldentey 49'	Report

Emirates Stadium, Holloway
Attendance: 22,517
Referee: Silvia Gasperotti (Italy)

Arsenal won 3–2 on aggregate.

18 March 2025
21:00

Bayern Munich (Germany)	0–2	(France) Lyon
	Report	Chawinga 35'; Dumornay 65'

FC Bayern Campus, Munich
Attendance: 2,500
Referee: Olatz Rivera Olmedo (Spain)
26 March 2025
18:45

Lyon (France)	4–1	(Germany) Bayern Munich
Dumornay 46'; Diani 54'; Chawinga 60'; Hegerberg 90+4'	Report	Bühl 33'

Parc Olympique Lyonnais, Décines-Charpieu
Attendance: 13,947
Referee: Iuliana Elena Demetrescu (Romania)

Lyon won 6–1 on aggregate.

19 March 2025
18:45

VfL Wolfsburg (Germany)	1–4	(Spain) Barcelona
Minge 79'	Report	Dijkstra 26' (o.g.); Paredes 50'; Paralluelo 53'; Schertenleib 88'

VfL Wolfsburg Arena, Wolfsburg
Attendance: 13,158
Referee: Ivana Projkovska (North Macedonia)
27 March 2025
18:45

Barcelona (Spain)	6–1	(Germany) VfL Wolfsburg
Paralluelo 10', 20'; Brugts 41'; Pina 62', 77'; León 90+1'	Report	Beerensteyn 72'

Johan Cruyff Stadium, Sant Joan Despí
Attendance: 4,651
Referee: Stéphanie Frappart (France)

Barcelona won 10–2 on aggregate.

19 March 2025
21:00 (20:00 UTC+0)

Manchester City (England)	2–0	(England) Chelsea
Miedema 60', 89'	Report

Academy Stadium, Manchester
Attendance: 4,094
Referee: Désirée Grundbacher (Switzerland)
27 March 2025
21:00 (20:00 UTC+0)

Chelsea (England)	3–0	(England) Manchester City
Baltimore 14'; Björn 38'; Ramírez 43'	Report

Stamford Bridge, Fulham
Attendance: 10,769
Referee: Catarina Campos (Portugal)

Chelsea won 3–2 on aggregate.

== Semi-finals ==
The draw for the semi-finals was held on 7 February 2025 (after the quarter-final draw).

=== Summary ===
The first legs were played on 19 and 20 April, and the second legs on 27 April 2025.

Semi-finals
Team 1	Agg.	Team 2	1st leg	2nd leg
Barcelona (Spain)	8–2	(England) Chelsea	4–1	4–1
Arsenal (England)	5–3	(France) Lyon	1–2	4–1

=== Matches ===
20 April 2025
18:00

Barcelona (Spain)	4–1	(England) Chelsea
Pajor 35'; Pina 70', 90'; Paredes 82'	Report	Baltimore 74'

Johan Cruyff Stadium, Sant Joan Despí
Attendance: 5,750
Referee: Katalin Kulcsár (Hungary)
27 April 2025
15:00 (14:00 UTC+1)

Chelsea (England)	1–4	(Spain) Barcelona
Kaptein 90+1'	Report	Bonmatí 25'; Pajor 41'; Pina 43'; Paralluelo 90'

Stamford Bridge, Fulham
Attendance: 23,573
Referee: Tess Olofsson (Sweden)

Barcelona won 8–2 on aggregate.

19 April 2025
13:30 (12:30 UTC+1)

Arsenal (England)	1–2	(France) Lyon
Caldentey 78' (pen.)	Report	Diani 17'; Dumornay 82'

Emirates Stadium, Holloway
Attendance: 40,045
Referee: Alina Peşu (Romania)
27 April 2025
18:00

Lyon (France)	1–4	(England) Arsenal
Dumornay 81'	Report	Endler 5' (o.g.); Caldentey 45+1'; Russo 46'; Foord 63'

Parc Olympique Lyonnais, Décines-Charpieu
Attendance: 20,015
Referee: Maria Caputi (Italy)

Arsenal won 5–3 on aggregate.

== Final ==
The final was played on 24 May 2025 at the Estádio José Alvalade in Lisbon. A draw was held on 7 February 2025 (after the quarter-final and semi-final draws), to determine which semi-final winner was designated as the "home" team for administrative purposes.

24 May 2025
18:00 (17:00 UTC+1)

Arsenal (England)	1–0	(Spain) Barcelona
Blackstenius 74'	Report

Estádio José Alvalade, Lisbon
Attendance: 38,356
Referee: Ivana Martinčić (Croatia)
