= 2024–25 UEFA Women's Champions League group stage =

The 2024–25 UEFA Women's Champions League group stage began on 8 October 2024 and ended on 18 December 2024. A total of 16 teams competed in the group stage to decide the eight places in the knockout phase of the 2024–25 UEFA Women's Champions League.

== Draw ==
The draw was held on 27 September 2024 and saw the 16 teams split into four pools of four teams.

- Pot 1 contained the four direct entrants, i.e., the Champions League holders and the champions of the top three associations based on their 2024 UEFA women's country coefficients.
- Pot 2, 3 and 4 contained the remaining teams, seeded based on their 2024 UEFA women's club coefficients.

Teams from the same association could not be drawn into the same group. Prior to the draw, UEFA formed one pairing of teams for associations with two or three teams based on television audiences, where one team was drawn into Groups A–B and another team into Groups C–D, so that the two teams play on different days.

== Teams ==
Below were the participating teams (with their 2024 UEFA club coefficients), grouped by their seeding pot.

- Four teams which entered in this stage
- 12 winners of the Round 2 (seven from Champions Path, five from League Path)

Key to colours
Group winners and runners-up advanced to quarter-finals

Pot 1 (by association rank)
Assoc.	Team	Coeff.
TH & 2	(Spain) Barcelona	130.633
1	(France) Lyon	118.666
3	(Germany) Bayern Munich	87.799
4	(England) Chelsea	84.999

Pot 2
Team	Notes	Coeff.
(Germany) VfL Wolfsburg		92.799
(England) Arsenal		57.999
(Spain) Real Madrid		41.633
(England) Manchester City		40.999

Pot 3
Team	Notes	Coeff.
(Italy) Juventus		40.800
(Austria) St. Pölten		32.250
(Italy) Roma		28.800
(Netherlands) Twente		18.400

Pot 4
Team	Notes	Coeff.
(Norway) Vålerenga		15.300
(Scotland) Celtic		6.400
(Sweden) Hammarby		4.999
(Turkey) Galatasaray		1.500

Notes

1. ^{TH} Champions League title holders, automatically placed into Pot 1 as top seed. Because the title holders were also the champions of the second-ranked association, the champions of the fourth-ranked association also entered the group stage.
2. ^{CH} Winners of round 2 (Champions Path).
3. ^{LP} Winners of round 2 (League Path).

== Format ==
In each group, teams played against each other home-and-away in a round-robin format. The top two teams of each group advanced to the quarter-finals.

=== Tiebreakers ===
Teams were ranked according to points (3 points for a win, 1 point for a draw, 0 points for a loss). If two or more teams were tied on points, the following tiebreaking criteria were applied, in the order given, to determine the rankings (see Article 18 Equality of points – group stage, Regulations of the UEFA Women's Champions League):

1. Points in head-to-head matches among the tied teams;
2. Goal difference in head-to-head matches among the tied teams;
3. Goals scored in head-to-head matches among the tied teams;
4. If more than two teams were tied, and after applying all head-to-head criteria above, a subset of teams are still tied, all head-to-head criteria above are reapplied exclusively to this subset of teams;
5. Goal difference in all group matches;
6. Goals scored in all group matches;
7. Away goals scored in all group matches;
8. Wins in all group matches;
9. Away wins in all group matches;
10. Disciplinary points (direct red card = 3 points; double yellow card = 3 points; single yellow card = 1 point);
11. UEFA club coefficient.

== Groups ==
Times are CEST (until 27 October) / CET, as listed by UEFA (local times, if different, are in parentheses).

=== Group A ===
Pos	Team	Pld	W	D	L	GF	GA	GD	Pts	Qualification	LYO	WOL	ROM	GAL
1	(France) Lyon	6	6	0	0	19	1	+18	18	Advance to quarter-finals	—	1–0	4–1	3–0
2	(Germany) VfL Wolfsburg	6	3	0	3	16	5	+11	9 (Note: Wolfsburg 3 Pts, +4 GD; Roma 3 Pts, −4 GD.)	Advance to quarter-finals	0–2	—	6–1	5–0
3	(Italy) Roma	6	3	0	3	12	14	−2	9		0–3	1–0	—	3–0
4	(Turkey) Galatasaray	6	0	0	6	1	28	−27	0		0–6	0–5	1–6	—

Source: UEFA
Rules for classification: Group stage tiebreakers
Notes:
8 October 2024
18:45

Lyon (France)	3–0	(Turkey) Galatasaray
Diani 34', 77'; Gilles 45'	Report

Parc Olympique Lyonnais, Décines-Charpieu
Attendance: 3,650
Referee: Michalina Diakow (Poland)
8 October 2024
18:45

Roma (Italy)	1–0	(Germany) VfL Wolfsburg
Giugliano 14' (pen.)	Report

Stadio Tre Fontane, Rome
Attendance: 1,345
Referee: Catarina Campos (Portugal)

17 October 2024
18:45 (19:45 UTC+3)

Galatasaray (Turkey)	1–6	(Italy) Roma
Stašková 76'	Report	Cissoko 7'; Giacinti 24'; Haavi 54'; Giugliano 59'; Pandini 84'; Corelli 87'

Atatürk Olympic Stadium, Istanbul
Attendance: 2,697
Referee: Tess Olofsson (Sweden)
17 October 2024
21:00

VfL Wolfsburg (Germany)	0–2	(France) Lyon
	Report	Renard 8'; Horan 53' (pen.)

AOK Stadion, Wolfsburg
Attendance: 2,403
Referee: Désirée Grundbacher (Switzerland)

13 November 2024
18:45 (20:45 UTC+3)

Galatasaray (Turkey)	0–5	(Germany) VfL Wolfsburg
	Report	Wedemeyer 24'; Blomqvist 63', 77', 90+6'; Endemann 90+7'

Atatürk Olympic Stadium, Istanbul
Attendance: 2,081
Referee: Olatz Rivera Olmedo (Spain)
13 November 2024
21:00

Roma (Italy)	0–3	(France) Lyon
	Report	Dumornay 36', 42'; Gilles 52'

Stadio Tre Fontane, Rome
Attendance: 1,906
Referee: Abigail Byrne (England)

20 November 2024
18:45

VfL Wolfsburg (Germany)	5–0	(Turkey) Galatasaray
Popp 3', 15', 88'; Minge 31'; Lattwein 90+6'	Report

AOK Stadion, Wolfsburg
Attendance: 2,536
Referee: Ivana Projkovska (North Macedonia)
20 November 2024
21:00

Lyon (France)	4–1	(Italy) Roma
Diani 77', 79'; Le Sommer 89'; Renard 90+2'	Report	Dragoni 74'

Parc Olympique Lyonnais, Décines-Charpieu
Attendance: 4,060
Referee: Marta Huerta de Aza (Spain)

11 December 2024
18:45

VfL Wolfsburg (Germany)	6–1	(Italy) Roma
Popp 6'; Beerensteyn 65'; Jónsdóttir 68', 85', 89', 90+2'	Report	Giacinti 56'

AOK Stadion, Wolfsburg
Attendance: 2,612
Referee: Ivana Martinčić (Croatia)
11 December 2024
18:45 (20:45 UTC+3)

Galatasaray (Turkey)	0–6	(France) Lyon
	Report	Hegerberg 19'; Däbritz 24'; Jackmon 34' (o.g.); Renard 49'; Van de Donk 69'; Le Sommer 76'

Atatürk Olympic Stadium, Istanbul
Attendance: 550
Referee: Catarina Campos (Portugal)

17 December 2024
21:00

Lyon (France)	1–0	(Germany) VfL Wolfsburg
Van de Donk 81'	Report

Parc Olympique Lyonnais, Décines-Charpieu
Attendance: 3,700
Referee: Alina Peşu (Romania)
17 December 2024
21:00

Roma (Italy)	3–0	(Turkey) Galatasaray
Corelli 9'; Ventriglia 82'; Linari 90+3'	Report

Stadio Tre Fontane, Rome
Attendance: 1,142
Referee: Shona Shukrula (Netherlands)

=== Group B ===
Pos	Team	Pld	W	D	L	GF	GA	GD	Pts	Qualification	CHE	RMA	TWE	CEL
1	(England) Chelsea	6	6	0	0	19	6	+13	18	Advance to quarter-finals	—	3–2	6–1	3–0
2	(Spain) Real Madrid	6	4	0	2	20	7	+13	12	Advance to quarter-finals	1–2	—	7–0	4–0
3	(Netherlands) Twente	6	2	0	4	9	19	−10	6		1–3	2–3	—	3–0
4	(Scotland) Celtic	6	0	0	6	1	17	−16	0		1–2	0–3	0–2	—

Source: UEFA
Rules for classification: Group stage tiebreakers
8 October 2024
21:00 (20:00 UTC+1)

Chelsea (England)	3–2	(Spain) Real Madrid
Nüsken 2'; Reiten 27' (pen.); Ramírez 53'	Report	Redondo 39'; Caicedo 84'

Stamford Bridge, Fulham
Attendance: 3,832
Referee: Ivana Martinčić (Croatia)
8 October 2024
21:00 (20:00 UTC+1)

Celtic (Scotland)	0–2	(Netherlands) Twente
	Report	Van Dooren 44', 85'

New Douglas Park, Hamilton
Attendance: 2,784
Referee: Ewa Augustyn (Poland)

17 October 2024
18:45

Real Madrid (Spain)	4–0	(Scotland) Celtic
Weir 7'; Bruun 72'; Møller 80'; Caicedo 83' (pen.)	Report

Estadio Alfredo Di Stéfano, Madrid
Attendance: 1,139
Referee: Silvia Gasperotti (Italy)
17 October 2024
21:00

Twente (Netherlands)	1–3	(England) Chelsea
Van Dijk 68'	Report	Beever-Jones 7'; Hamano 18'; Reiten 63' (pen.)

De Grolsch Veste, Enschede
Attendance: 4,000
Referee: Maria Sole Ferrieri Caputi (Italy)

13 November 2024
18:45

Real Madrid (Spain)	7–0	(Netherlands) Twente
Bruun 3'; Méndez 13', 63'; Feller 50'; Weir 55'; Hernández 65'; Camacho 90+2'	Report

Estadio Alfredo Di Stéfano, Madrid
Attendance: 1,017
Referee: Christian-Petru Ciochirca (Austria)
13 November 2024
21:00 (20:00 UTC+0)

Celtic (Scotland)	1–2	(England) Chelsea
Agnew 22'	Report	Hamano 28'; Lawrence 32'

Celtic Park, Glasgow
Attendance: 7,390
Referee: Hristiyana Guteva (Bulgaria)

20 November 2024
18:45

Twente (Netherlands)	2–3	(Spain) Real Madrid
Ravensbergen 29'; Te Brake 90+6'	Report	Caicedo 45+2'; Bruun 71'; Redondo 90+4'

De Grolsch Veste, Enschede
Attendance: 8,091
Referee: Katalin Kulcsár (Hungary)
20 November 2024
21:00 (20:00 UTC+0)

Chelsea (England)	3–0	(Scotland) Celtic
Bronze 2'; Kaptein 25'; Périsset 90+5' (pen.)	Report

Stamford Bridge, Fulham
Attendance: 3,931
Referee: Tess Olofsson (Sweden)

11 December 2024
21:00 (20:00 UTC+0)

Chelsea (England)	6–1	(Netherlands) Twente
Macário 2'; Jean-François 30'; Ramírez 35'; Knol 38' (o.g.); Nüsken 48'; Périsset 85'	Report	Van Dooren 29' (pen.)

Stamford Bridge, Fulham
Attendance: 10,500
Referee: Riem Hussein (Germany)
11 December 2024
21:00 (20:00 UTC+0)

Celtic (Scotland)	0–3	(Spain) Real Madrid
	Report	Bruun 30', 71'; Redondo 85'

New Douglas Park, Hamilton
Attendance: 1,314
Referee: Iuliana Elena Demetrescu (Romania)

17 December 2024
18:45

Real Madrid (Spain)	1–2	(England) Chelsea
Weir 7'	Report	Macário 51' (pen.), 56' (pen.)

Estadio Alfredo Di Stéfano, Madrid
Attendance: 2,057
Referee: Maria Sole Ferrieri Caputi (Italy)
17 December 2024
18:45

Twente (Netherlands)	3–0	(Scotland) Celtic
Van Dooren 20', 34'; Ross 43' (o.g.)	Report

De Grolsch Veste, Enschede
Attendance: 2,893
Referee: Frida Mia Klarlund (Denmark)

=== Group C ===
Pos	Team	Pld	W	D	L	GF	GA	GD	Pts	Qualification	ARS	BAY	JUV	VÅL
1	(England) Arsenal	6	5	0	1	17	9	+8	15	Advance to quarter-finals	—	3–2	1–0	4–1
2	(Germany) Bayern Munich	6	4	1	1	17	6	+11	13	Advance to quarter-finals	5–2	—	4–0	3–0
3	(Italy) Juventus	6	2	0	4	4	11	−7	6		0–4	0–2	—	3–0
4	(Norway) Vålerenga	6	0	1	5	3	15	−12	1		1–3	1–1	0–1	—

Source: UEFA
Rules for classification: Group stage tiebreakers
9 October 2024
18:45

Bayern Munich (Germany)	5–2	(England) Arsenal
Viggósdóttir 43'; Lohmann 56'; Harder 73', 78', 86'	Report	Caldentey 30'; Codina 65'

FC Bayern Campus, Munich
Attendance: 2,500
Referee: Lina Lehtovaara (Finland)
9 October 2024
21:00

Vålerenga (Norway)	0–1	(Italy) Juventus
	Report	Cantore 29'

Intility Arena, Oslo
Attendance: 1,923
Referee: Sandra Bastos (Portugal)

16 October 2024
18:45

Juventus (Italy)	0–2	(Germany) Bayern Munich
	Report	Dallmann 17'; Harder 73'

Stadio La Marmora-Pozzo, Biella
Attendance: 956
Referee: Ivana Projkovska (North Macedonia)
16 October 2024
21:00 (20:00 UTC+1)

Arsenal (England)	4–1	(Norway) Vålerenga
Fox 2'; Foord 29'; Caldentey 85'; Russo 90+3'	Report	Tvedten 35'

Emirates Stadium, Holloway
Attendance: 5,613
Referee: Marta Huerta de Aza (Spain)

12 November 2024
18:45

Juventus (Italy)	0–4	(England) Arsenal
	Report	Maanum 38'; Blackstenius 75'; Caldentey 80'; Foord 87'

Stadio La Marmora-Pozzo, Biella
Attendance: 1,427
Referee: Jelena Cvetković (Serbia)
12 November 2024
21:00

Bayern Munich (Germany)	3–0	(Norway) Vålerenga
Harder 10'; Gwinn 17' (pen.); Zadrazil 90+2'	Report

FC Bayern Campus, Munich
Attendance: 2,500
Referee: Alina Peşu (Romania)

21 November 2024
18:45

Vålerenga (Norway)	1–1	(Germany) Bayern Munich
Thorsnes 88'	Report	Damnjanović 75'

Intility Arena, Oslo
Attendance: 2,314
Referee: Goga Kikacheishvili (Georgia)
21 November 2024
21:00 (20:00 UTC+0)

Arsenal (England)	1–0	(Italy) Juventus
Hurtig 89'	Report

Emirates Stadium, Holloway
Attendance: 9,963
Referee: Ewa Augustyn (Poland)

12 December 2024
18:45

Bayern Munich (Germany)	4–0	(Italy) Juventus
Damnjanović 22'; Harder 52'; Bühl 73'; Şehitler 82'	Report

FC Bayern Campus, Munich
Attendance: 2,500
Referee: Stéphanie Frappart (France)
12 December 2024
18:45

Vålerenga (Norway)	1–3	(England) Arsenal
Lindwall 85'	Report	Russo 25', 58'; Maanum 37'

Intility Arena, Oslo
Attendance: 4,333
Referee: Eleni Antoniou (Greece)

18 December 2024
21:00 (20:00 UTC+0)

Arsenal (England)	3–2	(Germany) Bayern Munich
Viggósdóttir 7' (o.g.); Russo 59'; Caldentey 86' (pen.)	Report	Eriksson 39', 58'

Meadow Park, Borehamwood (Note: Originally scheduled to be played at Emirates Stadium, this match was moved to Meadow Park due to a fixture clash with Arsenal Men competing in the EFL Cup.)
Attendance: 3,385
Referee: Tess Olofsson (Sweden)
18 December 2024
21:00

Juventus (Italy)	3–0	(Norway) Vålerenga
Bergamaschi 6'; Cantore 56'; Kullberg 64'	Report

Stadio La Marmora-Pozzo, Biella
Attendance: 435
Referee: Olatz Rivera Olmedo (Spain)

=== Group D ===
Pos	Team	Pld	W	D	L	GF	GA	GD	Pts	Qualification	BAR	MCI	HAM	PÖL
1	(Spain) Barcelona	6	5	0	1	26	3	+23	15 (Note: Barcelona 3 Pts, +1 GD; Manchester City 3 Pts, −1 GD.)	Advance to quarter-finals	—	3–0	9–0	7–0
2	(England) Manchester City	6	5	0	1	11	6	+5	15	Advance to quarter-finals	2–0	—	2–0	2–0
3	(Sweden) Hammarby	6	2	0	4	5	17	−12	6		0–3	1–2	—	2–0
4	(Austria) St. Pölten	6	0	0	6	4	20	−16	0		1–4	2–3	1–2	—

Source: UEFA
Rules for classification: Group stage tiebreakers
Notes:
9 October 2024
18:45

Hammarby (Sweden)	2–0	(Austria) St. Pölten
Hasund 18'; Tandberg 88'	Report

Tele2 Arena, Stockholm
Attendance: 7,562
Referee: Shona Shukrula (Netherlands)
9 October 2024
21:00 (20:00 UTC+1)

Manchester City (England)	2–0	(Spain) Barcelona
Layzell 36'; Shaw 77'	Report

Academy Stadium, Manchester
Attendance: 5,508
Referee: Stéphanie Frappart (France)

16 October 2024
18:45

St. Pölten (Austria)	2–3	(England) Manchester City
Brunnthaler 40'; Dubcová 53'	Report	Kennedy 5'; Fujino 57'; Fowler 80'

Viola Park, Vienna
Attendance: 3,116
Referee: Iuliana Elena Demetrescu (Romania)
16 October 2024
21:00

Barcelona (Spain)	9–0	(Sweden) Hammarby
Graham Hansen 10', 75'; Pina 24', 58'; Putellas 45'; León 53'; Pajor 72'; Brugts 86'; Rolfö 90' (pen.)	Report

Johan Cruyff Stadium, Barcelona
Attendance: 4,915
Referee: Riem Hussein (Germany)

12 November 2024
18:45

Barcelona (Spain)	7–0	(Austria) St. Pölten
Pajor 32'; Nazareth 38'; Bonmatí 40'; Walsh 42'; Pina 45', 52' (pen.); Graham Hansen 87'	Report

Johan Cruyff Stadium, Barcelona
Attendance: 2,852
Referee: Eleni Antoniou (Greece)
12 November 2024
21:00 (20:00 UTC+0)

Manchester City (England)	2–0	(Sweden) Hammarby
Blindkilde Brown 47'; Fujino 80'	Report

Academy Stadium, Manchester
Attendance: 2,233
Referee: Frida Mia Klarlund (Denmark)

21 November 2024
18:45

Hammarby (Sweden)	1–2	(England) Manchester City
Wangerheim 48'	Report	Shaw 31', 52'

Tele2 Arena, Stockholm
Attendance: 20,428
Referee: Silvia Gasperotti (Italy)
21 November 2024
21:00

St. Pölten (Austria)	1–4	(Spain) Barcelona
Mädl 59'	Report	Nazareth 20', 29'; López 31'; Putellas 57'

Viola Park, Vienna
Attendance: 8,832
Referee: Désirée Grundbacher (Switzerland)

12 December 2024
21:00 (20:00 UTC+0)

Manchester City (England)	2–0	(Austria) St. Pölten
Murphy 55'; Casparij 66'	Report

Academy Stadium, Manchester
Attendance: 1,454
Referee: Sandra Bastos (Portugal)
12 December 2024
21:00

Hammarby (Sweden)	0–3	(Spain) Barcelona
	Report	Pajor 7', 40'; Bonmatí 80'

Tele2 Arena, Stockholm
Attendance: 18,746
Referee: Katalin Kulcsár (Hungary)

18 December 2024
18:45

Barcelona (Spain)	3–0	(England) Manchester City
Pina 44'; Bonmatí 57'; Putellas 69'	Report

Estadi Olímpic Lluís Companys, Barcelona
Attendance: 29,007
Referee: Jelena Cvetković (Serbia)
18 December 2024
18:45

St. Pölten (Austria)	1–2	(Sweden) Hammarby
Dubcová 83'	Report	Tandberg 20'; Blakstad 22'

Viola Park, Vienna
Attendance: 1,117
Referee: Hristiyana Guteva (Bulgaria)
