= 2024–25 in Spanish football =

Football in Spain
- Season: 2024–25

Men's football
- La Liga: Barcelona
- Segunda División: Levante
- Copa del Rey: Barcelona
- Supercopa: Barcelona

Women's football
- Liga F: Barcelona
- Supercopa: Barcelona

The 2024–25 season was the 123rd season of competitive association football in Spain.

== National team ==
=== Spain national football team ===
==== UEFA Euro 2024 ====
===== Knockout =====
5 July 2024 Euro 2024 Quarter-finals	Spain	2–1	Germany	Stuttgart, Germany
18:00 UTC+2		Report		Stadium: MHPArena

9 July 2024 Euro 2024 Semi-finals	Spain	2–1	France	Munich, Germany
21:00		Report		Stadium: Allianz Arena

Final

14 July 2024
21:00

Spain	2–1	England
Williams 47'; Oyarzabal 86'	Report	Palmer 73'

Olympiastadion, Berlin
Attendance: 65,600
Referee: François Letexier (France)

==== 2024–25 UEFA Nations League ====
===== 2024–25 UEFA Nations League A Group 4 =====
Pos	Team	Pld	W	D	L	GF	GA	GD	Pts	Qualification or relegation	(Spain)	(Denmark)	(Serbia)	(Switzerland)
1	Spain	6	5	1	0	13	4	+9	16	Advance to quarter-finals	—	1–0	3–0	3–2
2	Denmark	6	2	2	2	7	5	+2	8	Advance to quarter-finals	1–2	—	2–0	2–0
3	Serbia (O)	6	1	3	2	3	6	−3	6	Qualification for relegation play-offs	0–0	0–0	—	2–0
4	Switzerland (R)	6	0	2	4	6	14	−8	2	Relegation to League B	1–4	2–2	1–1	—

Source: UEFA
Rules for classification: Tiebreakers
(O) Play-off winners; (R) Relegated

5 September 2024	Serbia	0–0	Spain	Belgrade, Serbia
20:45 CEST		Report		Stadium: Red Star Stadium

8 September 2024	Switzerland	1–4	Spain	Bern, Switzerland
20:45 CEST		Report		Stadium: Stadion Wankdorf

12 October 2024	Spain	1–0	Denmark	Murcia, Spain
20:45 CEST		Report		Stadium: Estadio Nueva Condomina

15 October 2024	Spain	3–0	Serbia	Córdoba, Spain
20:45 CEST		Report		Stadium: Estadio Nuevo Arcángel

15 November 2024	Denmark	1–2	Spain	Copenhagen, Denmark
20:45 CEST		Report		Stadium: Parken Stadium

18 November 2024	Spain	3–2	Switzerland	Burgos, Spain
20:45 CEST		Report		Stadium: Estadio El Plantío

===== Quarter-finals =====
Team 1	Agg.	Team 2	1st leg	2nd leg
Netherlands	5–5 (4–5 p)	Spain	2–2	3–3 (a.e.t.)

20 March 2025	Netherlands	2–2	Spain	Rotterdam
	Gakpo 28'; Reijnders 46'	Report	Williams 9'; Merino 90+3'	Stadium: De Kuip; Attendance: 42,003; Referee: Glenn Nyberg (Sweden)

23 March 2025	Spain	3–3 (a.e.t.) (5–4 p)	Netherlands	Valencia
	Oyarzabal 8' (pen.), 67'; Yamal 103'	Report	Depay 54' (pen.); Maatsen 79'; Simons 109' (pen.)	Stadium: Mestalla; Attendance: 48,082; Referee: Clément Turpin (France)
	Penalties
	Merino (penalty scored); Torres (penalty scored); García (penalty scored); Yamal (penalty missed); Baena (penalty scored); Pedri (penalty scored)		(penalty scored) Van Dijk; (penalty scored) Koopmeiners; (penalty scored) Simons; (penalty missed) Lang; (penalty scored) Taylor; (penalty missed) Malen

===== Finals =====
5 June 2025 2024–25 UEFA Nations League SF	Spain	5–4	France	Stuttgart, Germany
20:45 CEST		Report		Stadium: MHPArena

====== Final ======
8 June 2025
21:00

Portugal	2–2 (a.e.t.)	Spain
Mendes 26'; Ronaldo 61'	Report	Zubimendi 21'; Oyarzabal 45'
Penalties
Ramos (penalty scored); Vitinha (penalty scored); Fernandes (penalty scored); Mendes (penalty scored); R. Neves (penalty scored)	5–3	(penalty scored) Merino; (penalty scored) Baena; (penalty scored) Isco; (penalty missed) Morata

Allianz Arena, Munich
Attendance: 65,852
Referee: Sandro Schärer (Switzerland)

=== U–23 ===
==== Summer Olympics ====
===== Group C =====
Pos	Team	Pld	W	D	L	GF	GA	GD	Pts	Qualification
1	Egypt	3	2	1	0	3	1	+2	7	Advance to knockout stage
2	Spain	3	2	0	1	6	4	+2	6	Advance to knockout stage
3	Dominican Republic	3	0	2	1	2	4	−2	2	
4	Uzbekistan	3	0	1	2	2	4	−2	1	

Source: FIFA

24 July 2024	Uzbekistan	1–2	Spain	Paris, France
15:00 UTC+2	Shomurodov 45+3'	Report	Pubill 28'; Gómez 62'	Stadium: Parc des Princes; Attendance: 46,500; Referee: Dahane Beida (Mauritania)

27 July 2024	Dominican Republic	1–3	Spain	Bordeaux, France
15:00 UTC+2	Ángel Montes 38'	Report	F. López 24'; Baena 55'; Gutiérrez 70'	Stadium: Stade de Bordeaux; Referee: Adel Al-Naqbi (United Arab Emirates)

30 July 2024	Spain	1–2	Egypt	Bordeaux, France
15:00 UTC+2	Omorodion 90'	Report	Ibrahim Adel 40', 62'	Stadium: Stade de Bordeaux; Referee: Drew Fischer (Canada)

===== Knock-out stage =====
2 August 2024 QF	Japan	0–3	Spain	Décines-Charpieu, France
17:00 UTC+2		Report	F. López 11', 73'; Ruiz 86'	Stadium: Stade de Lyon; Referee: Dahane Beida (Mauritania)

5 August 2024 SF	Morocco	1–2	Spain	Marseille, France
18:00 UTC+2	Rahimi 37' (pen.)	Report	F. López 65'; Sánchez 86'	Stadium: Stade de Marseille; Referee: Ilgiz Tantashev (Uzbekistan)

===== Gold medal match =====
9 August 2024
18:00

France	3–5 (a.e.t.)	Spain
Millot 11'; Akliouche 79'; Mateta 90+3' (pen.)	Report	López 18', 25'; Baena 28'; Camello 100', 120+1'

Parc des Princes, Paris
Attendance: 44,260
Referee: Ramon Abatti (Brazil)

=== Spain women's national football team ===
==== Friendlies ====
25 October 2024	Spain	1–1	Canada	Almendralejo
20:45	Martín-Prieto 88'	Report	Alidou d'Anjou 49'	Stadium: Francisco de la Hera; Attendance: 10,500; Referee: Ewa Augustyn (Poland)

29 October 2024	Italy	1–1	Spain	Vicenza
18:15	Beccari 88'	Report	Redondo 85'	Stadium: Stadio Romeo Menti; Attendance: 4,700; Referee: Franziska Wildfeuer (Germany)

29 November 2024	Spain	5–0	South Korea	Cartagena
19:00	Pina 4'; Sarriegi 33'; Bonmatí 45+1'; López 63', 90+3'	Report		Stadium: Estadio Cartagonova; Attendance: 8,672; Referee: Kirsty Dowle (England)

3 December 2024	France	2–4	Spain	Nice
21:00	Méndez 37' (o.g.); Diani 71'	Report	Bonmatí 6'; Pina 23'; L. García 60'; Caldentey 81' (pen.)	Stadium: Stade de Nice; Attendance: 6,233; Referee: Ionela Peşu (Romania)

==== UEFA Women's Euro 2025 qualifying League A ====
Pos	Team	Pld	W	D	L	GF	GA	GD	Pts	Qualification	(Spain)	(Denmark)	(Belgium)	(Czech Republic)
1	Spain	6	5	0	1	18	5	+13	15	Qualify for final tournament	—	3–2	2–0	3–1
2	Denmark	6	4	0	2	14	8	+6	12	Qualify for final tournament	0–2	—	4–2	2–0
3	Belgium	6	1	1	4	5	18	−13	4 (Note: Head-to-head points: Belgium 4, Czech Republic 1.)	Advance to play-offs (seeded)	0–7	0–3	—	1–1
4	Czech Republic (R)	6	1	1	4	6	12	−6	4	Advance to play-offs (seeded) and relegation to League B	2–1	1–3	1–2	—

Source: UEFA
Rules for classification: Tiebreakers
(R) Relegated
Notes:

12 July 2024	Czech Republic	2–1	Spain	Chomutov
18:00	Svitková 44'; Bartoňová 51' (pen.)	Report	Bonmatí 15'	Stadium: Letní stadion Attendance: 1,893; Referee: Riem Hussein (Germany)

16 July 2024	Spain	2–0	Belgium	A Coruña
19:00	Bonmatí 39'; Abelleira 90+1'	Report		Stadium: Riazor; Attendance: 16,650; Referee: Iuliana Demetrescu (Romania)

==== Summer Olympics ====
===== Group stage =====
====== Group C ======
Pos	Team	Pld	W	D	L	GF	GA	GD	Pts	Qualification
1	Spain	3	3	0	0	5	1	+4	9	Advance to knockout stage
2	Japan	3	2	0	1	6	4	+2	6	Advance to knockout stage
3	Brazil	3	1	0	2	2	4	−2	3	Advance to knockout stage
4	Nigeria	3	0	0	3	1	5	−4	0	

Source: FIFA

25 July 2024	Spain	2–1	Japan	Nantes, France
17:00	Bonmatí 22'; Caldentey 74'	Report	Fujino 13'	Stadium: Stade de la Beaujoire; Attendance: 10,377; Referee: Bouchra Karboubi (Morocco)

28 July 2024	Spain	1–0	Nigeria	Nantes, France
19:00	Putellas 85'	Report		Stadium: Stade de la Beaujoire; Attendance: 11,079; Referee: Tori Penso (United States)

31 July 2024	Brazil	0–2	Spain	Bordeaux, France
17:00		Report	Del Castillo 68'; Putellas 90+17'	Stadium: Stade de Bordeaux; Attendance: 14,497; Referee: Espen Eskås (Norway)

===== Knockout stage =====
3 August 2024 QF	Spain	2–2 (a.e.t.) (4–2 p)	Colombia	Décines-Charpieu, France
17:00	Hermoso 79'; Paredes 90+7'	Report	Ramírez 12'; Santos 52'	Stadium: Stade de Lyon; Attendance: 10,355; Referee: Katia García (Mexico)
	Penalties
	Caldentey (penalty scored); Navarro (penalty scored); Paralluelo (penalty scored); Bonmatí (penalty scored)		(penalty missed) Usme; (penalty scored) Vanegas; (penalty missed) Salazar; (penalty scored) Carabalí

6 August 2024 SF	Brazil	4–2	Spain	Marseille, France
21:00	Paredes 6' (o.g.); Gabi Portilho 45+4'; Adriana 72'; Kerolin 90+1'	Report	Paralluelo 85', 90+12'	Stadium: Stade de Marseille; Attendance: 14,201; Referee: Rebecca Welch (Great Britain)

9 August 2024 Bronze	Spain	0–1	Germany	Décines-Charpieu, France
		Report	Gwinn 64' (pen.)	Stadium: Stade de Lyon; Attendance: 10,995; Referee: Katia García (Mexico)

==== 2025 UEFA Women's Nations League ====
===== 2025 UEFA Women's Nations League A Group A3 =====
Pos	Team	Pld	W	D	L	GF	GA	GD	Pts	Qualification or relegation	(Spain)	(England)	(Belgium)	(Portugal)
1	Spain	6	5	0	1	21	8	+13	15	Qualification for Nations League Finals	—	2–1	3–2	7–1
2	England	6	3	1	2	16	6	+10	10		1–0	—	5–0	6–0
3	Belgium (R)	6	2	0	4	9	16	−7	6	Qualification for relegation play-offs	1–5	3–2	—	0–1
4	Portugal (R)	6	1	1	4	5	21	−16	4	Relegation to League B	2–4	1–1	0–3	—

Source: UEFA
Rules for classification: Tiebreakers
(R) Relegated

21 February 2025	Spain	3–2	Belgium	Valencia
18:45	Pina 77'; García 90+2'; Martín-Prieto 90+6'	Report	Toloba 18'; Wullaert 72'	Stadium: Estadi Ciutat de València; Attendance: 9,369; Referee: Frida Klarlund (Denmark)

26 February 2025	England	1–0	Spain	London
21:00	Park 33'	Report		Stadium: Wembley Stadium; Attendance: 46,550; Referee: Tess Olofsson (Sweden)

4 April 2025	Portugal	2–4	Spain	Paços de Ferreira
19:45 UTC+1	Amado 27'; Carole 56' (pen.)	Report	Guijarro 25'; Aleixandri 40'; Pina 43'; González 89'	Stadium: Estádio Capital do Móvel; Attendance: 5,225; Referee: Iuliana Demetrescu (Romania)

8 April 2025	Spain	7–1	Portugal	Vigo
19:00	Paralluelo 2'; Bonmatí 8', 12'; Putellas 28', 51'; Caldentey 47'; González 60'	Report	Fonseca 71'	Stadium: Balaídos Stadium; Attendance: 15,526; Referee: Stéphanie Frappart (France)

30 May 2025	Belgium	1–5	Spain	Leuven
20:30	De Caigny 88'	Report	González 36', 64'; Del Castillo 78', 79'; Redondo 85'	Stadium: Den Dreef; Attendance: 8,504; Referee: Ewa Augustyn (Poland)

3 June 2025	Spain	2–1	England	Cornellà de Llobregat
19:00	Pina 60', 70'	Report	Russo 22'	Stadium: RCDE Stadium; Attendance: 14,107; Referee: Katalin Kulcsár (Hungary)

=== U–20 ===
==== 2024 FIFA U-20 Women's World Cup ====
===== Group C =====
Pos	Team	Pld	W	D	L	GF	GA	GD	Pts	Qualification
1	Spain	3	3	0	0	5	0	+5	9	Knockout stage
2	United States	3	2	0	1	9	1	+8	6	Knockout stage
3	Paraguay	3	1	0	2	2	9	−7	3	
4	Morocco	3	0	0	3	0	6	−6	0	

Source: FIFA
Rules for classification: Group stage tiebreakers

1 September 2024	Spain	1–0	United States	Cali, Colombia
15:00	Enrique 8'	Report		Stadium: Estadio Pascual Guerrero; Attendance: 9,979; Referee: Anahí Fernández (Uruguay)

4 September 2024	Spain	2–0	Paraguay	Cali, Colombia
17:00	Amezaga 20', 37'	Report		Stadium: Estadio Pascual Guerrero; Referee: Dong Fangyu (China)

7 September 2024	Morocco	0–2	Spain	Cali, Colombia
18:00		Report	Aparicio 5'; Moral 89'	Stadium: Estadio Pascual Guerrero; Referee: Oh Hyeon-jeong (South Korea)

===== Knockout stage =====
11 September 2024 R16	Spain	2–1	Canada	Cali, Colombia
16:30		Report		Stadium: Estadio Pascual Guerrero; Referee: Oh Hyeon-jeong (South Korea)

15 September 2024 QF	Japan	1–0 (a.e.t.)	Spain	Medellín, Colombia
18:00		Report		Stadium: Estadio Atanasio Girardot

== UEFA competitions ==
=== UEFA Super Cup ===
14 August 2024
21:00 UTC+2

Real Madrid (Spain)	2–0	(Italy) Atalanta
Valverde 59'; Mbappé 68'	Report

National Stadium, Warsaw
Attendance: 56,042
Referee: Sandro Schärer (Switzerland)

=== UEFA Champions League ===
==== League phase ====
===== Atlético Madrid =====
Pos	Team	Pld	W	D	L	GF	GA	GD	Pts	Qualification
3	(The Football Association) Arsenal	8	6	1	1	16	3	+13	19	Advance to round of 16 (seeded)
4	(Italian Football Federation) Inter Milan	8	6	1	1	11	1	+10	19	Advance to round of 16 (seeded)
5	(Royal Spanish Football Federation) Atlético Madrid	8	6	0	2	20	12	+8	18	Advance to round of 16 (seeded)
6	(German Football Association) Bayer Leverkusen	8	5	1	2	15	7	+8	16	Advance to round of 16 (seeded)
7	(French Football Federation) Lille	8	5	1	2	17	10	+7	16	Advance to round of 16 (seeded)

Source: UEFA
Rules for classification: League phase tiebreakers

Home team	Score	Away team
Atlético Madrid (Spain)	2–1	(Germany) RB Leipzig
Benfica (Portugal)	4–0	(Spain) Atlético Madrid
Atlético Madrid (Spain)	1–3	(France) Lille
Paris Saint-Germain (France)	1–2	(Spain) Atlético Madrid
Sparta Prague (Czech Republic)	0–6	(Spain) Atlético Madrid
Atlético Madrid (Spain)	3–1	(Slovakia) Slovan Bratislava
Atlético Madrid (Spain)	2–1	(Germany) Bayer Leverkusen
Red Bull Salzburg (Austria)	1–4	(Spain) Atlético Madrid

===== Barcelona =====
Pos	Team	Pld	W	D	L	GF	GA	GD	Pts	Qualification
1	(The Football Association) Liverpool	8	7	0	1	17	5	+12	21	Advance to round of 16 (seeded)
2	(Royal Spanish Football Federation) Barcelona	8	6	1	1	28	13	+15	19	Advance to round of 16 (seeded)
3	(The Football Association) Arsenal	8	6	1	1	16	3	+13	19	Advance to round of 16 (seeded)
4	(Italian Football Federation) Inter Milan	8	6	1	1	11	1	+10	19	Advance to round of 16 (seeded)
5	(Royal Spanish Football Federation) Atlético Madrid	8	6	0	2	20	12	+8	18	Advance to round of 16 (seeded)

Source: UEFA
Rules for classification: League phase tiebreakers

Home team	Score	Away team
Monaco (France)	2–1	(Spain) Barcelona
Barcelona (Spain)	5–0	(Switzerland) Young Boys
Barcelona (Spain)	4–1	(Germany) Bayern Munich
Red Star Belgrade (Serbia)	2–5	(Spain) Barcelona
Barcelona (Spain)	3–0	(France) Brest
Borussia Dortmund (Germany)	2–3	(Spain) Barcelona
Benfica (Portugal)	4–5	(Spain) Barcelona
Barcelona (Spain)	2–2	(Italy) Atalanta

===== Girona =====
Pos	Team	Pld	W	D	L	GF	GA	GD	Pts
31	(Football Association of the Czech Republic) Sparta Prague	8	1	1	6	7	21	−14	4
32	(German Football Association) RB Leipzig	8	1	0	7	8	15	−7	3
33	(Royal Spanish Football Federation) Girona	8	1	0	7	5	13	−8	3
34	(Austrian Football Association) Red Bull Salzburg	8	1	0	7	5	27	−22	3
35	(Slovak Football Association) Slovan Bratislava	8	0	0	8	7	27	−20	0

Source: UEFA
Rules for classification: League phase tiebreakers

Home team	Score	Away team
Paris Saint-Germain (France)	1–0	(Spain) Girona
Girona (Spain)	2–3	(Netherlands) Feyenoord
Girona (Spain)	2–0	(Slovakia) Slovan Bratislava
PSV Eindhoven (Netherlands)	4–0	(Spain) Girona
Sturm Graz (Austria)	1–0	(Spain) Girona
Girona (Spain)	0–1	(England) Liverpool
Milan (Italy)	1–0	(Spain) Girona
Girona (Spain)	1–2	(England) Arsenal

===== Real Madrid =====
Pos	Team	Pld	W	D	L	GF	GA	GD	Pts	Qualification
9	(Italian Football Federation) Atalanta	8	4	3	1	20	6	+14	15	Advance to knockout phase play-offs (seeded)
10	(German Football Association) Borussia Dortmund	8	5	0	3	22	12	+10	15	Advance to knockout phase play-offs (seeded)
11	(Royal Spanish Football Federation) Real Madrid	8	5	0	3	20	12	+8	15 (Note: Tied on points (15), goal difference (+8), goals scored (20), away goals (6) and wins (5). Ranked on away wins: Real Madrid 2, Bayern Munich 1.)	Advance to knockout phase play-offs (seeded)
12	(German Football Association) Bayern Munich	8	5	0	3	20	12	+8	15	Advance to knockout phase play-offs (seeded)
13	(Italian Football Federation) Milan	8	5	0	3	14	11	+3	15	Advance to knockout phase play-offs (seeded)

Source: UEFA
Rules for classification: League phase tiebreakers
Notes:

Home team	Score	Away team
Real Madrid (Spain)	3–1	(Germany) VfB Stuttgart
Lille (France)	1–0	(Spain) Real Madrid
Real Madrid (Spain)	5–2	(Germany) Borussia Dortmund
Real Madrid (Spain)	1–3	(Italy) Milan
Liverpool (England)	2–0	(Spain) Real Madrid
Atalanta (Italy)	2–3	(Spain) Real Madrid
Real Madrid (Spain)	5–1	(Austria) Red Bull Salzburg
Brest (France)	0–3	(Spain) Real Madrid

==== Knockout phase ====
===== Knockout phase play-offs =====
Team 1	Agg.	Team 2	1st leg	2nd leg
Manchester City (England)	3–6	(Spain) Real Madrid	2–3	1–3

===== Round of 16 =====
Team 1	Agg.	Team 2	1st leg	2nd leg
Real Madrid (Spain)	2–2 (4–2 p)	(Spain) Atlético Madrid	2–1	0–1 (a.e.t.)
Benfica (Portugal)	1–4	(Spain) Barcelona	0–1	1–3

===== Quarter–Finals =====
Team 1	Agg.	Team 2	1st leg	2nd leg
Arsenal (England)	5–1	(Spain) Real Madrid	3–0	2–1
Barcelona (Spain)	5–3	(Germany) Borussia Dortmund	4–0	1–3

===== Semi–Finals =====
Team 1	Agg.	Team 2	1st leg	2nd leg
Barcelona (Spain)	6–7	(Italy) Inter Milan	3–3	3–4 (a.e.t.)

=== UEFA Europa League ===
==== League phase ====
===== Athletic Bilbao =====
Pos	Team	Pld	W	D	L	GF	GA	GD	Pts	Qualification
1	(Italian Football Federation) Lazio	8	6	1	1	17	5	+12	19	Advance to round of 16 (seeded)
2	(Royal Spanish Football Federation) Athletic Bilbao	8	6	1	1	15	7	+8	19	Advance to round of 16 (seeded)
3	(The Football Association) Manchester United	8	5	3	0	16	9	+7	18	Advance to round of 16 (seeded)
4	(The Football Association) Tottenham Hotspur	8	5	2	1	17	9	+8	17	Advance to round of 16 (seeded)
5	(German Football Association) Eintracht Frankfurt	8	5	1	2	14	10	+4	16	Advance to round of 16 (seeded)

Source: UEFA
Rules for classification: League phase tiebreakers

Home team	Score	Away team
Roma (Italy)	1–1	(Spain) Athletic Bilbao
Athletic Bilbao (Spain)	2–0	(Netherlands) AZ
Athletic Bilbao (Spain)	1–0	(Czech Republic) Slavia Prague
Ludogorets Razgrad (Bulgaria)	1–2	(Spain) Athletic Bilbao
Athletic Bilbao (Spain)	3–0	(Sweden) IF Elfsborg
Fenerbahçe (Turkey)	0–2	(Spain) Athletic Bilbao
Beşiktaş (Turkey)	4–1	(Spain) Athletic Bilbao
Athletic Bilbao (Spain)	3–1	(Czech Republic) Viktoria Plzeň

===== Real Sociedad =====
Pos	Team	Pld	W	D	L	GF	GA	GD	Pts	Qualification
11	(Romanian Football Federation) FCSB	8	4	2	2	10	9	+1	14	Advance to knockout phase play-offs (seeded)
12	(Royal Dutch Football Association) Ajax	8	4	1	3	16	8	+8	13	Advance to knockout phase play-offs (seeded)
13	(Royal Spanish Football Federation) Real Sociedad	8	4	1	3	13	9	+4	13	Advance to knockout phase play-offs (seeded)
14	(Turkish Football Federation) Galatasaray	8	3	4	1	19	16	+3	13	Advance to knockout phase play-offs (seeded)
15	(Italian Football Federation) Roma	8	3	3	2	10	6	+4	12	Advance to knockout phase play-offs (seeded)

Source: UEFA
Rules for classification: League phase tiebreakers

Home team	Score	Away team
Nice (France)	1–1	(Spain) Real Sociedad
Real Sociedad (Spain)	1–2	(Belgium) Anderlecht
Maccabi Tel Aviv (Israel)	1–2	(Spain) Real Sociedad
Viktoria Plzeň (Czech Republic)	2–1	(Spain) Real Sociedad
Real Sociedad (Spain)	2–0	(Netherlands) Ajax
Real Sociedad (Spain)	3–0	(Ukraine) Dynamo Kyiv
Lazio (Italy)	3–1	(Spain) Real Sociedad
Real Sociedad (Spain)	3–0	(Greece) PAOK

==== Knockout phase ====
===== Knockout phase play-offs =====
Team 1	Agg.	Team 2	1st leg	2nd leg
Midtjylland (Denmark)	3–7	(Spain) Real Sociedad	1–2	2–5

===== Round of 16 =====
Team 1	Agg.	Team 2	1st leg	2nd leg
Roma (Italy)	3–4	(Spain) Athletic Bilbao	2–1	1–3
Real Sociedad (Spain)	2–5	(England) Manchester United	1–1	1–4

===== Quarter-finals =====
Team 1	Agg.	Team 2	1st leg	2nd leg
Rangers (Scotland)	0–2	(Spain) Athletic Bilbao	0–0	0–2

===== Semi-finals =====
Team 1	Agg.	Team 2	1st leg	2nd leg
Athletic Bilbao (Spain)	1–7	(England) Manchester United	0–3	1–4

=== UEFA Conference League ===
==== Qualifying phase and play-off round ====
===== Play-off round =====
Team 1	Agg.	Team 2	1st leg	2nd leg
Kryvbas Kryvyi Rih (Ukraine)	0–5	(Spain) Real Betis	0–2	0–3

==== League phase ====
===== Real Betis =====
Pos	Team	Pld	W	D	L	GF	GA	GD	Pts	Qualification
13	(Hellenic Football Federation) Panathinaikos	6	3	1	2	10	7	+3	10	Advance to knockout phase play-offs (seeded)
14	(Football Association of Slovenia) Olimpija Ljubljana	6	3	1	2	7	6	+1	10	Advance to knockout phase play-offs (seeded)
15	(Royal Spanish Football Federation) Real Betis	6	3	1	2	6	5	+1	10	Advance to knockout phase play-offs (seeded)
16	(German Football Association) 1. FC Heidenheim	6	3	1	2	7	7	0	10	Advance to knockout phase play-offs (seeded)
17	(Royal Belgian Football Association) Gent	6	3	0	3	8	8	0	9	Advance to knockout phase play-offs (unseeded)

Source: UEFA
Rules for classification: League phase tiebreakers

Home team	Score	Away team
Legia Warsaw (Poland)	1–0	(Spain) Real Betis
Real Betis (Spain)	1–1	(Denmark) Copenhagen
Real Betis (Spain)	2–1	(Slovenia) Celje
Mladá Boleslav (Czech Republic)	2–1	(Spain) Real Betis
Petrocub Hîncești (Moldova)	0–1	(Spain) Real Betis
Real Betis (Spain)	1–0	(Finland) HJK

==== Knockout phase ====
===== Play-off round =====
Team 1	Agg.	Team 2	1st leg	2nd leg
Gent (Belgium)	1–3	(Spain) Real Betis	0–3	1–0

===== Round of 16 =====
Team 1	Agg.	Team 2	1st leg	2nd leg
Real Betis (Spain)	6–2	(Portugal) Vitória de Guimarães	2–2	4–0

===== Quarter-finals =====
Team 1	Agg.	Team 2	1st leg	2nd leg
Real Betis (Spain)	3–1	(Poland) Jagiellonia Białystok	2–0	1–1

===== Semi-finals =====
Team 1	Agg.	Team 2	1st leg	2nd leg
Real Betis (Spain)	4–3	(Italy) Fiorentina	2–1	2–2 (a.e.t.)

===== Final =====
28 May 2025
21:00 UTC+2

Real Betis (Royal Spanish Football Federation)	1–4	(The Football Association) Chelsea
Ezzalzouli 9'	Report	Fernández 65'; Jackson 70'; Sancho 83'; Caicedo 90+1'

Wrocław Stadium, Wrocław
Attendance: 39,754
Referee: Irfan Peljto (Bosnia and Herzegovina)

=== UEFA Women's Champions League ===
==== Qualifying rounds ====
===== Round 1 =====
====== Semi-finals ======
Team 1	Score	Team 2
Atlético Madrid (Spain)	2–2 (2–3 p)	(Norway) Rosenborg

====== Third-place play-off ======
Team 1	Score	Team 2
Rangers (Scotland)	0–3	(Spain) Atlético Madrid

===== Round 2 =====
Team 1	Agg.	Team 2	1st leg	2nd leg
Sporting CP (Portugal)	2–5	(Spain) Real Madrid	1–2	1–3

==== Group stage ====
===== Group B =====
Pos	Team	Pld	W	D	L	GF	GA	GD	Pts	Qualification	CHE	RMA	TWE	CEL
1	(England) Chelsea	6	6	0	0	19	6	+13	18	Advance to quarter-finals	—	3–2	6–1	3–0
2	(Spain) Real Madrid	6	4	0	2	20	7	+13	12	Advance to quarter-finals	1–2	—	7–0	4–0
3	(Netherlands) Twente	6	2	0	4	9	19	−10	6		1–3	2–3	—	3–0
4	(Scotland) Celtic	6	0	0	6	1	17	−16	0		1–2	0–3	0–2	—

Source: UEFA
Rules for classification: Group stage tiebreakers

===== Group D =====
Pos	Team	Pld	W	D	L	GF	GA	GD	Pts	Qualification	BAR	MCI	HAM	PÖL
1	(Spain) Barcelona	6	5	0	1	26	3	+23	15 (Note: Barcelona 3 Pts, +1 GD; Manchester City 3 Pts, −1 GD.)	Advance to quarter-finals	—	3–0	9–0	7–0
2	(England) Manchester City	6	5	0	1	11	6	+5	15	Advance to quarter-finals	2–0	—	2–0	2–0
3	(Sweden) Hammarby	6	2	0	4	5	17	−12	6		0–3	1–2	—	2–0
4	(Austria) St. Pölten	6	0	0	6	4	20	−16	0		1–4	2–3	1–2	—

Source: UEFA
Rules for classification: Group stage tiebreakers

==== Knockout phase ====
===== Quarter-finals =====
Team 1	Agg.	Team 2	1st leg	2nd leg
Real Madrid (Spain)	2–3	(England) Arsenal	2–0	0–3
VfL Wolfsburg (Germany)	2–10	(Spain) Barcelona	1–4	1–6

===== Semi-finals =====
Team 1	Agg.	Team 2	1st leg	2nd leg
Barcelona (Spain)	8–2	(England) Chelsea	4–1	4–1

===== Final =====
24 May 2025
17:00 UTC+1

Arsenal (The Football Association)	1–0	(Royal Spanish Football Federation) Barcelona
Blackstenius 74'	Report

Estádio José Alvalade, Lisbon
Attendance: 38,356
Referee: Ivana Martinčić (Croatia)

=== UEFA Youth League ===
==== UEFA Champions League Path ====
===== Atlético Madrid =====
Pos	Team	Pld	W	D	L	GF	GA	GD	Pts	Qualification
6	(Royal Spanish Football Federation) Real Madrid	6	4	0	2	10	5	+5	12	Advance to knockout phase
7	(Italian Football Federation) Atalanta	6	4	0	2	14	12	+2	12	Advance to knockout phase
8	(Royal Spanish Football Federation) Atlético Madrid	6	3	2	1	16	8	+8	11	Advance to knockout phase
9	(Portuguese Football Federation) Benfica	6	3	2	1	12	7	+5	11	Advance to knockout phase
10	(Italian Football Federation) Juventus	6	3	2	1	9	4	+5	11	Advance to knockout phase

Source: UEFA
Rules for classification: League phase tiebreakers

Home team	Score	Away team
Atlético Madrid (Spain)	4–0	(Germany) RB Leipzig
Benfica (Portugal)	2–2	(Spain) Atlético Madrid
Atlético Madrid (Spain)	1–1	(France) Lille
Paris Saint-Germain (France)	4–2	(Spain) Atlético Madrid
Sparta Prague (Czech Republic)	1–2	(Spain) Atlético Madrid
Atlético Madrid (Spain)	5–0	(Slovakia) Slovan Bratislava

===== Barcelona =====
Pos	Team	Pld	W	D	L	GF	GA	GD	Pts	Qualification
2	(Portuguese Football Federation) Sporting CP	6	5	1	0	13	3	+10	16	Advance to knockout phase
3	(Austrian Football Association) Red Bull Salzburg	6	5	1	0	17	9	+8	16	Advance to knockout phase
4	(Royal Spanish Football Federation) Barcelona	6	5	0	1	17	10	+7	15	Advance to knockout phase
5	(German Football Association) VfB Stuttgart	6	4	1	1	13	6	+7	13	Advance to knockout phase
6	(Royal Spanish Football Federation) Real Madrid	6	4	0	2	10	5	+5	12	Advance to knockout phase

Source: UEFA
Rules for classification: League phase tiebreakers

Home team	Score	Away team
Monaco (France)	4–3	(Spain) Barcelona
Barcelona (Spain)	4–2	(Switzerland) Young Boys
Barcelona (Spain)	3–1	(Germany) Bayern Munich
Red Star Belgrade (Serbia)	1–2	(Spain) Barcelona
Barcelona (Spain)	2–0	(France) Brest
Borussia Dortmund (Germany)	2–3	(Spain) Barcelona

===== Girona =====
Pos	Team	Pld	W	D	L	GF	GA	GD	Pts	Qualification
10	(Italian Football Federation) Juventus	6	3	2	1	9	4	+5	11	Advance to knockout phase
11	(The Football Association) Manchester City	6	3	1	2	16	8	+8	10	Advance to knockout phase
12	(Royal Spanish Football Federation) Girona	6	2	4	0	9	5	+4	10	Advance to knockout phase
13	(German Football Association) Bayern Munich	6	3	1	2	11	12	−1	10	Advance to knockout phase
14	(Ukrainian Association of Football) Shakhtar Donetsk	6	3	1	2	9	11	−2	10	Advance to knockout phase

Source: UEFA
Rules for classification: League phase tiebreakers

Home team	Score	Away team
Paris Saint-Germain (France)	0–2	(Spain) Girona
Girona (Spain)	2–0	(Netherlands) Feyenoord
Girona (Spain)	2–2	(Slovakia) Slovan Bratislava
PSV Eindhoven (Netherlands)	1–1	(Spain) Girona
Sturm Graz (Austria)	0–0	(Spain) Girona
Girona (Spain)	2–2	(England) Liverpool

===== Real Madrid =====
Pos	Team	Pld	W	D	L	GF	GA	GD	Pts	Qualification
4	(Royal Spanish Football Federation) Barcelona	6	5	0	1	17	10	+7	15	Advance to knockout phase
5	(German Football Association) VfB Stuttgart	6	4	1	1	13	6	+7	13	Advance to knockout phase
6	(Royal Spanish Football Federation) Real Madrid	6	4	0	2	10	5	+5	12	Advance to knockout phase
7	(Italian Football Federation) Atalanta	6	4	0	2	14	12	+2	12	Advance to knockout phase
8	(Royal Spanish Football Federation) Atlético Madrid	6	3	2	1	16	8	+8	11	Advance to knockout phase

Source: UEFA
Rules for classification: League phase tiebreakers

Home team	Score	Away team
Real Madrid (Spain)	1–0	(Germany) VfB Stuttgart
Lille (France)	2–1	(Spain) Real Madrid
Real Madrid (Spain)	1–2	(Germany) Borussia Dortmund
Real Madrid (Spain)	2–1	(Italy) Milan
Liverpool (England)	0–1	(Spain) Real Madrid
Atalanta (Italy)	0–4	(Spain) Real Madrid

==== Domestic Champions Path ====
===== Second round =====
Team 1	Agg.	Team 2	1st leg	2nd leg
Real Betis (Spain)	11–1	(Kazakhstan) Kairat	6–1	5–0

===== Third round =====
Team 1	Agg.	Team 2	1st leg	2nd leg
Real Betis (Spain)	4–2	(Italy) Sassuolo	3–1	1–1

==== Knockout phase ====
===== Round of 32 =====
Home team	Score	Away team
Barcelona (Spain)	2–2 (5–3 p)	(Croatia) Dinamo Zagreb
Real Madrid (Spain)	2–0	(Germany) Borussia Dortmund
Rapid Wien (Austria)	1–2	(Spain) Atlético Madrid
Olympiacos (Greece)	1–0	(Spain) Girona
Real Betis (Spain)	0–1	(Germany) Bayern Munich

===== Round of 16 =====
Home team	Score	Away team
Red Bull Salzburg (Austria)	2–1	(Spain) Atlético Madrid
Real Madrid (Spain)	0–2	(Netherlands) AZ
Aston Villa (England)	1–3	(Spain) Barcelona

===== Quarter-finals =====
Home team	Score	Away team
VfB Stuttgart (Germany)	1–2	(Spain) Barcelona

===== Semi-finals =====
Home team	Score	Away team
AZ (Netherlands)	0–1	(Spain) Barcelona

===== Final =====
The final was played on 28 April 2025 at Colovray Stadium, Nyon.

28 April 2025
18:00

Trabzonspor (Turkey)	1–4	(Spain) Barcelona
Tibukoğlu 88'	Report	Diarra 11', 68'; Cuenca 18'; Alba 57'

Colovray Stadium, Nyon
Attendance: 3,081
Referee: Andrea Colombo (Italy)

== Men's football ==
=== League season ===
==== La Liga ====
Pos	Team	Pld	W	D	L	GF	GA	GD	Pts	Qualification or relegation
1	Barcelona (C)	38	28	4	6	102	39	+63	88	Qualification for the Champions League league stage (Note: La Liga gained an additional Champions League place as a result of Spain gaining one of the two European Performance Spots (EPS) awarded to the two associations with the highest UEFA coefficient points in 2024–25.)
2	Real Madrid	38	26	6	6	78	38	+40	84	Qualification for the Champions League league stage
3	Atlético Madrid	38	22	10	6	68	30	+38	76	Qualification for the Champions League league stage
4	Athletic Bilbao	38	19	13	6	54	29	+25	70 (Note: Athletic Bilbao finished ahead of Villarreal on head-to-head points: Athletic Bilbao 2–0 Villarreal, Villarreal 0–0 Athletic Bilbao.)	Qualification for the Champions League league stage
5	Villarreal	38	20	10	8	71	51	+20	70	Qualification for the Champions League league stage
6	Real Betis	38	16	12	10	57	50	+7	60	Qualification for the Europa League league stage (Note: The 2024–25 Copa del Rey winner qualified for the Europa League league stage. Since the cup winners (Barcelona) qualified based on league position, the Europa League spot was passed to the seventh-placed team, and the Conference League spot was passed to the eighth-placed team.)
7	Celta Vigo	38	16	7	15	59	57	+2	55	Qualification for the Europa League league stage
8	Rayo Vallecano	38	13	13	12	41	45	−4	52 (Note: Rayo Vallecano finished ahead of Osasuna on head-to-head points: Rayo Vallecano 3–1 Osasuna, Osasuna 1–1 Rayo Vallecano.)	Qualification for the Conference League play-off round
9	Osasuna	38	12	16	10	48	52	−4	52	
10	Mallorca	38	13	9	16	35	44	−9	48	
11	Real Sociedad	38	13	7	18	35	46	−11	46 (Note: Real Sociedad finished ahead of Valencia on head-to-head goal difference: Real Sociedad 3–0 Valencia, Valencia 1–0 Real Sociedad.)	
12	Valencia	38	11	13	14	44	54	−10	46	
13	Getafe	38	11	9	18	34	39	−5	42 (Note: Head-to-head points: Getafe 9, Espanyol 9, Alavés 0.)	
14	Espanyol	38	11	9	18	40	51	−11	42	
15	Alavés	38	10	12	16	38	48	−10	42	
16	Girona	38	11	8	19	44	60	−16	41 (Note: Girona finished ahead of Sevilla on head-to-head goal difference: Sevilla 0–2 Girona, Girona 1–2 Sevilla.)	
17	Sevilla	38	10	11	17	42	55	−13	41	
18	Leganés (R)	38	9	13	16	39	56	−17	40	Relegation to Segunda División
19	Las Palmas (R)	38	8	8	22	40	61	−21	32	Relegation to Segunda División
20	Valladolid (R)	38	4	4	30	26	90	−64	16	Relegation to Segunda División

Source: LaLiga EA Sports
Rules for classification: 1) Points; 2) Head-to-head points; 3) Head-to-head goal difference; 4) Goal difference; 5) Goals scored; 6) Fair-play points
(Note: Head-to-head record is used only after all the matches between the teams in question have been played)
(C) Champions; (R) Relegated

==== Segunda División ====
Pos	Team	Pld	W	D	L	GF	GA	GD	Pts	Qualification or relegation
1	Levante (C, P)	42	22	13	7	69	42	+27	79	Promotion to La Liga
2	Elche (P)	42	22	11	9	59	34	+25	77	Promotion to La Liga
3	Oviedo (O, P)	42	21	12	9	56	42	+14	75 (Note: Oviedo finished ahead of Mirandés on head-to-head goal difference: Oviedo 4–1 Mirandés, Mirandés 1–0 Oviedo.)	Qualification for promotion playoffs
4	Mirandés	42	22	9	11	59	40	+19	75	Qualification for promotion playoffs
5	Racing Santander	42	20	11	11	65	51	+14	71	Qualification for promotion playoffs
6	Almería	42	19	12	11	72	55	+17	69	Qualification for promotion playoffs
7	Granada	42	18	11	13	65	54	+11	65	
8	Huesca	42	18	10	14	58	49	+9	64	
9	Eibar	42	15	13	14	44	41	+3	58 (Note: Eibar finished ahead of Albacete on head-to-head points: Albacete 0–1 Eibar, Eibar 1–1 Albacete.)	
10	Albacete	42	15	13	14	57	57	0	58	
11	Sporting Gijón	42	14	14	14	57	54	+3	56	
12	Burgos	42	15	10	17	41	48	−7	55 (Note: Burgos finished ahead of Cádiz and Córdoba on head-to-head points: Burgos 6 pts, Cádiz 5 pts, Córdoba 4 pts.)	
13	Cádiz	42	14	13	15	55	53	+2	55	
14	Córdoba	42	14	13	15	59	63	−4	55	
15	Deportivo La Coruña	42	13	14	15	56	54	+2	53 (Note: Deportivo La Coruña finished ahead of Málaga and Castellón on head-to-head points: Deportivo La Coruña 6 pts, Málaga 5 pts, Castellón 4 pts.)	
16	Málaga	42	12	17	13	42	46	−4	53	
17	Castellón	42	14	11	17	65	63	+2	53	
18	Zaragoza	42	13	12	17	56	63	−7	51	
19	Eldense (R)	42	11	12	19	44	63	−19	45	Relegation to Primera Federación
20	Tenerife (R)	42	8	12	22	35	55	−20	36	Relegation to Primera Federación
21	Racing Ferrol (R)	42	6	12	24	22	64	−42	30	Relegation to Primera Federación
22	Cartagena (R)	42	6	5	31	33	78	−45	23	Relegation to Primera Federación

Source: LaLiga Hypermotion
Rules for classification: 1) Points; 2) Head-to-head points; 3) Head-to-head goal difference; 4) Goal difference; 5) Goals scored; 6) Fair-play points
(Note: Head-to-head record is used only after all the matches between the teams in question have been played)
(C) Champions; (O) Play-off winners; (P) Promoted; (R) Relegated

=== Cup competitions ===
==== 2024–25 Copa del Rey ====
===== Final =====
26 April 2025
22:00 CEST

Barcelona	3–2 (a.e.t.)	Real Madrid
Pedri 28'; Torres 84'; Koundé 116'	Report	Mbappé 70'; Tchouaméni 77'

La Cartuja, Seville
Attendance: 55,579
Referee: Ricardo de Burgos Bengoetxea

==== Supercopa de España ====
Semi-finals
9 January 2025 – Jeddah
Real Madrid	3
Mallorca	0
8 January 2025 – Jeddah
Athletic Bilbao	0
Barcelona	2

Final
12 January 2025 – Jeddah
Real Madrid	2
Barcelona	5

===== Final =====
12 January 2025
22:00

Real Madrid	2–5	Barcelona
Mbappé 5'; Rodrygo 60'	Report	Yamal 22'; Lewandowski 36' (pen.); Raphinha 39', 48'; Balde 45+10'

King Abdullah Sports City, Jeddah
Attendance: 60,000
Referee: Jesús Gil Manzano (Extremadura)

==== Copa Federación de España ====
13 November
20:00

Extremadura (5)	2–1	Compostela (4)

Estadio Francisco de la Hera, Almendralejo

=== International competitions ===
==== FIFA Club World Cup ====
===== Group B =====
Pos	Team	Pld	W	D	L	GF	GA	GD	Pts	Qualification
1	(France) Paris Saint-Germain	3	2	0	1	6	1	+5	6 (Note: Tied on head-to-head points (3). Head-to-head goal difference: Paris Saint-Germain +3, Botafogo 0, Atlético Madrid –3.)	Advance to knockout stage
2	(Brazil) Botafogo	3	2	0	1	3	2	+1	6	Advance to knockout stage
3	(Spain) Atlético Madrid	3	2	0	1	4	5	−1	6	
4	(United States) Seattle Sounders FC	3	0	0	3	2	7	−5	0	

Source: FIFA

===== Group H =====
Pos	Team	Pld	W	D	L	GF	GA	GD	Pts	Qualification
1	(Spain) Real Madrid	3	2	1	0	7	2	+5	7	Advance to knockout stage
2	(Saudi Arabia) Al-Hilal	3	1	2	0	3	1	+2	5	Advance to knockout stage
3	(Austria) Red Bull Salzburg	3	1	1	1	2	4	−2	4	
4	(Mexico) Pachuca	3	0	0	3	2	7	−5	0	

Source: FIFA

== Women's football ==
=== League season ===
==== Liga F ====
Pos	Team	Pld	W	D	L	GF	GA	GD	Pts	Qualification or relegation
1	Barcelona (C)	30	28	0	2	128	16	+112	84	Qualification for the Champions League league phase
2	Real Madrid	30	24	4	2	87	28	+59	76	Qualification for the Champions League third qualifying round
3	Atlético Madrid	30	16	10	4	49	23	+26	58	Qualification for the Champions League third qualifying round
4	Athletic Club	30	16	3	11	40	32	+8	51	
5	Granada	30	14	3	13	42	45	−3	45	
6	UD Tenerife	30	11	9	10	40	36	+4	42	
7	Real Sociedad	30	12	5	13	40	45	−5	41	
8	Eibar	30	10	8	12	24	41	−17	38	
9	Sevilla	30	10	6	14	32	47	−15	36	
10	Madrid CFF	30	9	6	15	37	62	−25	33	
11	Espanyol	30	7	11	12	29	50	−21	32	
12	Levante	30	8	7	15	30	45	−15	31	
13	Levante Badalona	30	6	10	14	24	45	−21	28	
14	Deportivo Abanca	30	6	9	15	27	48	−21	27	
15	Real Betis (R)	30	6	5	19	24	67	−43	23	Relegation to Primera Federación
16	Valencia (R)	30	5	8	17	24	47	−23	23	Relegation to Primera Federación

Source: LigaF.es
Rules for classification: 1) Points; 2) Head-to-head points; 3) Goal difference; 4) Number of goals scored
(C) Champions; (R) Relegated

=== Cup competitions ===
==== Supercopa de España ====
Semi-finals
22 January 2025
Barcelona	3
Atlético Madrid	0
23 January 2025
Real Madrid	3
Real Sociedad	2

Final
26 January 2025
Barcelona	5
Real Madrid	0
