= 2024–25 in French football =

Football in France
- Season: 2024–25

Men's football
- Ligue 1: Paris Saint-Germain
- Ligue 2: Lorient
- Championnat National: Nancy
- Coupe de France: Paris Saint-Germain
- Trophée des Champions: Paris Saint-Germain

Women's football
- Première Ligue: Lyon
- Coupe de France: Paris FC

The following article is a summary of the 2024–25 football season in France, which was the 91st season of competitive football in the country and ran from July 2024 to June 2025.

== National team ==
=== France national football team ===
==== UEFA Euro 2024 ====
===== Knockout stage =====
1 July 2024 EURO R16	France	1–0	Belgium	Düsseldorf
18:00		Report		Stadium: Merkur Spiel-Arena

5 July 2024 EURO QF	Portugal	0–0 (a.e.t.) (3–5 p)	France	Hamburg
				Stadium: Volksparkstadion
	Penalties
	Ronaldo (penalty scored); B. Silva (penalty scored); Félix (penalty missed); Mendes (penalty scored)		(penalty scored) Dembélé; (penalty scored) Fofana; (penalty scored) Koundé; (penalty scored) Barcola; (penalty scored) Hernandez

9 July 2024 EURO SF	Spain	2–1	France	Munich, Germany
21:00		Report		Stadium: Allianz Arena

==== 2024–25 UEFA Nations League ====
===== 2024–25 UEFA Nations League A Group 2 =====
Pos	Team	Pld	W	D	L	GF	GA	GD	Pts	Qualification or relegation	(France)	(Italy)	(Belgium)	(Israel)
1	France	6	4	1	1	12	6	+6	13 (Note: Tied on head to head results. Overall goal difference: France +6, Italy +5.)	Advance to quarter-finals	—	1–3	2–0	0–0
2	Italy	6	4	1	1	13	8	+5	13	Advance to quarter-finals	1–3	—	2–2	4–1
3	Belgium (O)	6	1	1	4	6	9	−3	4 (Note: Tied on head to head points. Head to head goal difference: Belgium +1, Israel –1.)	Qualification for relegation play-offs	1–2	0–1	—	3–1
4	Israel (R)	6	1	1	4	5	13	−8	4	Relegation to League B	1–4	1–2	1–0	—

Source: UEFA
Rules for classification: Tiebreakers
(O) Play-off winners; (R) Relegated
Notes:

6 September 2024	France	1–3	Italy	Paris, France
20:45		Report		Stadium: Parc des Princes

9 September 2024	France	2–0	Belgium	Décines-Charpieu, France
20:45		Report		Stadium: Allianz Riviera Nice

10 October 2024	Israel	1–4	France	Budapest (Hungary) (Note: Due to the Gaza war, Israel are required to play their home matches at neutral venues until further notice.)
20:45		Report		Stadium: Bozsik Aréna

14 October 2024	Belgium	1–2	France	Leuven, Belgium
20:45		Report		Stadium: Den Dreef

14 November 2024	France	0–0	Israel	Saint-Denis, France
20:45		Report		Stadium: Stade de France

17 November 2024	Italy	1–3	France	Cagliari, Italy
20:45		Report		Stadium: Sardegna Arena

===== Quarter-finals =====
Team 1	Agg.	Team 2	1st leg	2nd leg
Croatia	2–2 (4–5 p)	France	2–0	0–2 (a.e.t.)

20 March 2025	Croatia	2–0	France	Split
	Budimir 26'; Perišić 45+1'	Report		Stadium: Stadion Poljud; Attendance: 30,551; Referee: Espen Eskås (Norway)

23 March 2025	France	2–0 (2–2 agg.) (5–4 p)	Croatia	Saint-Denis, France
	Olise 52'; Dembélé 80'	Report		Stadium: Stade de France; Attendance: 77,502; Referee: Michael Oliver (England)
	Penalties
	Mbappé (penalty scored); Tchouaméni (penalty scored); Koundé (penalty missed); Kolo Muani (penalty scored); Hernández (penalty missed); Doué (penalty scored); Upamecano (penalty scored)		(penalty missed) Baturina; (penalty scored) Moro; (penalty missed) Ivanović; (penalty scored) Pašalić; (penalty scored) Jakić; (penalty scored) Ćaleta-Car; (penalty missed) Stanišić

===== Finals =====
5 June 2025 2024–25 Nations League SF	Spain	5–4	France	Stuttgart, Germany
20:45 CEST		Report		Stadium: MHPArena

8 June 2025 2024–25 Nations League 3rd	Germany	0–2	France	Stuttgart, Germany
15:00 CEST		Report	Mbappé 45'; Olise 84'	Stadium: MHPArena; Attendance: 51,313; Referee: Ivan Kružliak (Slovakia)

=== U23 ===
==== Summer Olympics ====
===== Group A =====
Pos	Team	Pld	W	D	L	GF	GA	GD	Pts	Qualification
1	France (H)	3	3	0	0	7	0	+7	9	Advance to knockout stage
2	United States	3	2	0	1	7	4	+3	6	Advance to knockout stage
3	New Zealand	3	1	0	2	3	8	−5	3	
4	Guinea	3	0	0	3	1	6	−5	0	

Source: FIFA
(H) Hosts

24 July 2024	France	3–0	United States	Marseille, France
21:00 UTC+2	Lacazette 61'; Olise 69'; Badé 85'	Report		Stadium: Stade de Marseille; Attendance: 48,721; Referee: Yael Falcón (Argentina)

27 July 2024	France	1–0	Guinea	Nice, France
21:00 UTC+2	Sildillia 76'	Report		Stadium: Stade de Nice; Attendance: 36,178; Referee: Ilgiz Tantashev (Uzbekistan)

30 July 2024	New Zealand	0–3	France	Marseille, France
19:00 UTC+2		Report	Mateta 19'; Doué 71'; Kalimuendo 74'	Stadium: Stade de Marseille; Referee: Katia García (Mexico)

===== Knock-out stage =====
2 August 2024 QF	France	1–0	Argentina	Bordeaux, France
21:00 UTC+2	Mateta 5'	Report		Stadium: Stade de Bordeaux; Attendance: 37,153; Referee: Ilgiz Tantashev (Uzbekistan)

5 August 2024 SF	France	3–1 (a.e.t.)	Egypt	Décines-Charpieu, France
21:00 UTC+2	Mateta 83', 99'; Olise 108'	Report	Mahmoud Saber 62'	Stadium: Stade de Lyon; Referee: Saíd Martínez (Honduras)

===== Gold medal match =====
9 August 2024
18:00

France	3–5 (a.e.t.)	Spain
Millot 11'; Akliouche 79'; Mateta 90+3' (pen.)	Report	López 18', 25'; Baena 28'; Camello 100', 120+1'

Parc des Princes, Paris
Attendance: 44,260
Referee: Ramon Abatti (Brazil)

=== France women's national football team ===
==== Friendlies ====
5 July 2024	France	5–0	Uzbekistan

25 October 2024	France	3–0	Jamaica	Montbéliard
21:10				Stadium: Stade Auguste-Bonal

29 October 2024	Switzerland	2–1	France	Geneva
21:00				Stadium: Stade de Genève

3 December 2024	France	v	Spain	Nice
				Stadium: Stade de Nice

==== UEFA Women's Euro 2025 qualifying League A ====
Pos	Team	Pld	W	D	L	GF	GA	GD	Pts	Qualification	(France)	(England)	(Sweden)	(Republic of Ireland)
1	France	6	4	0	2	8	7	+1	12	Qualify for final tournament	—	1–2	2–1	1–0
2	England	6	3	2	1	8	5	+3	11	Qualify for final tournament	1–2	—	1–1	2–1
3	Sweden	6	2	2	2	6	4	+2	8	Advance to play-offs (seeded)	0–1	0–0	—	1–0
4	Republic of Ireland (R)	6	1	0	5	4	10	−6	3	Advance to play-offs (seeded) and relegation to League B	3–1	0–2	0–3	—

Source: UEFA
Rules for classification: Tiebreakers
(R) Relegated

12 July 2024	France	2–1	Sweden	Dijon
		Report		Stadium: Stade Gaston Gérard; Referee: Jelena Cvetković (Serbia)

16 July 2024	Republic of Ireland	3–1	France	Cork, Ireland
		Report		Stadium: Páirc Uí Chaoimh; Referee: Olatz Rivera Olmedo (Spain)

==== Summer Olympics ====
===== Group stage =====
====== Group A ======
Pos	Team	Pld	W	D	L	GF	GA	GD	Pts	Qualification
1	France (H)	3	2	0	1	6	5	+1	6	Advance to knockout stage
2	Canada	3	3	0	0	5	2	+3	3 (Note: On 27 July 2024, Canada was penalized 6 points by FIFA for their coaching staff's involvement in illegal drone spying at an official training venue. The decision was upheld by CAS on 31 July.)	Advance to knockout stage
3	Colombia	3	1	0	2	4	4	0	3	Advance to knockout stage
4	New Zealand	3	0	0	3	2	6	−4	0	

Source: FIFA
(H) Hosts
Notes:

25 July 2024	France	3–2	Colombia	Décines-Charpieu
21:00	Katoto 6', 42'; Dali 18'	Report	Katoto 6', 42'; Dali 18'	Stadium: Stade de Lyon; Referee: Tori Penso (United States)

28 July 2024	France	1–2	Canada	Saint-Étienne
21:00	Katoto 42'	Report	Fleming 58'; Gilles 90+12'	Stadium: Stade Geoffroy-Guichard; Referee: Bouchra Karboubi (Morocco)

31 July 2024	New Zealand	1–2	France	Décines-Charpieu
21:00	Taylor 43'	Report	Katoto 22', 49'	Stadium: Stade de Lyon; Referee: Edina Alves Batista (Brazil)

===== Knock-out stage =====
3 August 2024 QF	France	0–1	Brazil	Nantes
21:00		Report	Gabi Portilho 82'	Stadium: Stade de la Beaujoire; Referee: Tori Penso (United States)

==== 2025 UEFA Women's Nations League ====
===== 2025 UEFA Women's Nations League A Group A2 =====
Pos	Team	Pld	W	D	L	GF	GA	GD	Pts	Qualification or relegation	(France)	(Norway)	(Iceland)	(Switzerland)
1	France	6	6	0	0	14	2	+12	18	Qualification for Nations League Finals	—	1–0	3–2	4–0
2	Norway	6	2	2	2	4	5	−1	8		0–2	—	1–1	2–1
3	Iceland (O)	6	0	4	2	6	9	−3	4	Qualification for relegation play-offs	0–2	0–0	—	3–3
4	Switzerland (R)	6	0	2	4	4	12	−8	2	Relegation to League B	0–2	0–1	0–0	—

Source: UEFA
Rules for classification: Tiebreakers
(O) Play-off winners; (R) Relegated

21 February 2025	France	1–0	Norway

26 February 2025	France	v	Iceland

4 April 2025	Switzerland	v	France

8 April 2025	Norway	v	France

30 May 2025	France	v	Switzerland

3 June 2025	Iceland	v	France

=== U–19 ===
==== 2024 FIFA U-20 Women's World Cup ====
===== Group B =====
Pos	Team	Pld	W	D	L	GF	GA	GD	Pts	Qualification
1	Brazil	3	3	0	0	14	0	+14	9	Knockout stage
2	France	3	1	1	1	14	6	+8	4	Knockout stage
3	Canada	3	1	1	1	12	5	+7	4	Knockout stage
4	Fiji	3	0	0	3	0	29	−29	0	

Source: FIFA
Rules for classification: Group stage tiebreakers

31 August 2024	France	3–3	Canada	Medellín, Colombia
15:00	Scannapiéco 8', 49'; Diaz 67'	Report	Rose 4'; Markesini 22'; Chukwu 84'	Stadium: Estadio Atanasio Girardot; Referee: Dong Fangyu (China)

3 September 2024	France	0–3	Brazil	Medellín, Colombia
17:00		Report	Vendito 7', 19'; Priscila 75'	Stadium: Estadio Atanasio Girardot; Referee: Oh Hyeon-jeong (South Korea)

6 September 2024	Fiji	0–11	France	Medellín, Colombia
20:00		Report	Lejeune 2'; Joseph 10', 45+3', 55', 80'; Neller 14'; Rekha 15' (o.g.); Haugou 41' (pen.); Scannapiéco 49', 54'; Mé. Mendy 90+5' (pen.)	Stadium: Estadio Atanasio Girardot; Referee: Marcelly Zambrano (Ecuador)

===== Knockout stage =====
12 September 2024 R16	France	1–2 (a.e.t.)	Netherlands	Medellín, Colombia
20:00		Report		Stadium: Estadio Atanasio Girardot; Referee: Ivana Martinčić (Croatia)

== UEFA competitions ==
=== UEFA Champions League ===
==== Qualifying phase and play-off round ====
===== Third qualifying round =====
Team 1	Agg.	Team 2	1st leg	2nd leg
Lille (France)	3–2	(Turkey) Fenerbahçe	2–1	1–1 (a.e.t.)

===== Play-off round =====
Team 1	Agg.	Team 2	1st leg	2nd leg
Lille (France)	3–2	(Czech Republic) Slavia Prague	2–0	1–2

==== League phase ====
===== Brest =====
Pos	Team	Pld	W	D	L	GF	GA	GD	Pts	Qualification
16	(Portuguese Football Federation) Benfica	8	4	1	3	16	12	+4	13	Advance to knockout phase play-offs (seeded)
17	(French Football Federation) Monaco	8	4	1	3	13	13	0	13	Advance to knockout phase play-offs (unseeded)
18	(French Football Federation) Brest	8	4	1	3	10	11	−1	13	Advance to knockout phase play-offs (unseeded)
19	(Royal Dutch Football Association) Feyenoord	8	4	1	3	18	21	−3	13	Advance to knockout phase play-offs (unseeded)
20	(Italian Football Federation) Juventus	8	3	3	2	9	7	+2	12	Advance to knockout phase play-offs (unseeded)

Source: UEFA
Rules for classification: League phase tiebreakers

Home team	Score	Away team
Brest (France)	2–1	(Austria) Sturm Graz
Red Bull Salzburg (Austria)	0–4	(France) Brest
Brest (France)	1–1	(Germany) Bayer Leverkusen
Sparta Prague (Czech Republic)	1–2	(France) Brest
Barcelona (Spain)	3–0	(France) Brest
Brest (France)	1–0	(Netherlands) PSV Eindhoven
Shakhtar Donetsk (Ukraine)	2–0	(France) Brest
Brest (France)	0–3	(Spain) Real Madrid

===== Lille =====
Pos	Team	Pld	W	D	L	GF	GA	GD	Pts	Qualification
5	(Royal Spanish Football Federation) Atlético Madrid	8	6	0	2	20	12	+8	18	Advance to round of 16 (seeded)
6	(German Football Association) Bayer Leverkusen	8	5	1	2	15	7	+8	16	Advance to round of 16 (seeded)
7	(French Football Federation) Lille	8	5	1	2	17	10	+7	16	Advance to round of 16 (seeded)
8	(The Football Association) Aston Villa	8	5	1	2	13	6	+7	16	Advance to round of 16 (seeded)
9	(Italian Football Federation) Atalanta	8	4	3	1	20	6	+14	15	Advance to knockout phase play-offs (seeded)

Source: UEFA
Rules for classification: League phase tiebreakers

Home team	Score	Away team
Sporting CP (Portugal)	2–0	(France) Lille
Lille (France)	1–0	(Spain) Real Madrid
Atlético Madrid (Spain)	1–3	(France) Lille
Lille (France)	1–1	(Italy) Juventus
Bologna (Italy)	1–2	(France) Lille
Lille (France)	3–2	(Austria) Sturm Graz
Liverpool (England)	2–1	(France) Lille
Lille (France)	6–1	(Netherlands) Feyenoord

===== Monaco =====
Pos	Team	Pld	W	D	L	GF	GA	GD	Pts	Qualification
15	(French Football Federation) Paris Saint-Germain	8	4	1	3	14	9	+5	13	Advance to knockout phase play-offs (seeded)
16	(Portuguese Football Federation) Benfica	8	4	1	3	16	12	+4	13	Advance to knockout phase play-offs (seeded)
17	(French Football Federation) Monaco	8	4	1	3	13	13	0	13	Advance to knockout phase play-offs (unseeded)
18	(French Football Federation) Brest	8	4	1	3	10	11	−1	13	Advance to knockout phase play-offs (unseeded)
19	(Royal Dutch Football Association) Feyenoord	8	4	1	3	18	21	−3	13	Advance to knockout phase play-offs (unseeded)

Source: UEFA
Rules for classification: League phase tiebreakers

Home team	Score	Away team
Monaco (France)	2–1	(Spain) Barcelona
Dinamo Zagreb (Croatia)	2–2	(France) Monaco
Monaco (France)	5–1	(Serbia) Red Star Belgrade
Bologna (Italy)	0–1	(France) Monaco
Monaco (France)	2–3	(Portugal) Benfica
Arsenal (England)	3–0	(France) Monaco
Monaco (France)	1–0	(England) Aston Villa
Inter Milan (Italy)	3–0	(France) Monaco

===== Paris Saint-Germain =====
Pos	Team	Pld	W	D	L	GF	GA	GD	Pts	Qualification
13	(Italian Football Federation) Milan	8	5	0	3	14	11	+3	15	Advance to knockout phase play-offs (seeded)
14	(Royal Dutch Football Association) PSV Eindhoven	8	4	2	2	16	12	+4	14	Advance to knockout phase play-offs (seeded)
15	(French Football Federation) Paris Saint-Germain	8	4	1	3	14	9	+5	13	Advance to knockout phase play-offs (seeded)
16	(Portuguese Football Federation) Benfica	8	4	1	3	16	12	+4	13	Advance to knockout phase play-offs (seeded)
17	(French Football Federation) Monaco	8	4	1	3	13	13	0	13	Advance to knockout phase play-offs (unseeded)

Source: UEFA
Rules for classification: League phase tiebreakers

Home team	Score	Away team
Paris Saint-Germain (France)	1–0	(Spain) Girona
Arsenal (England)	2–0	(France) Paris Saint-Germain
Paris Saint-Germain (France)	1–1	(Netherlands) PSV Eindhoven
Paris Saint-Germain (France)	1–2	(Spain) Atlético Madrid
Bayern Munich (Germany)	1–0	(France) Paris Saint-Germain
Red Bull Salzburg (Austria)	0–3	(France) Paris Saint-Germain
Paris Saint-Germain (France)	4–2	(England) Manchester City
VfB Stuttgart (Germany)	1–4	(France) Paris Saint-Germain

==== Knockout phase ====
===== Knockout phase play-offs =====
Team 1	Agg.	Team 2	1st leg	2nd leg
Brest (France)	0–10	(France) Paris Saint-Germain	0–3	0–7
Monaco (France)	3–4	(Portugal) Benfica	0–1	3–3

===== Round of 16 =====
Team 1	Agg.	Team 2	1st leg	2nd leg
Paris Saint-Germain (France)	1–1 (4–1 p)	(England) Liverpool	0–1	1–0 (a.e.t.)
Borussia Dortmund (Germany)	3–2	(France) Lille	1–1	2–1

===== Quarter-finals =====
Team 1	Agg.	Team 2	1st leg	2nd leg
Paris Saint-Germain (France)	5–4	(England) Aston Villa	3–1	2–3

===== Semi-finals =====
Team 1	Agg.	Team 2	1st leg	2nd leg
Arsenal (England)	1–3	(France) Paris Saint-Germain	0–1	1–2

===== Final =====
31 May 2025
21:00 UTC+2

Paris Saint-Germain (France)	5–0	(Italy) Inter Milan
Hakimi 12'; Doué 20', 63'; Kvaratskhelia 73'; Mayulu 86'	Report

Allianz Arena, Munich
Attendance: 64,327
Referee: István Kovács (Romania)

=== UEFA Europa League ===
==== League phase ====
===== Lyon =====
Pos	Team	Pld	W	D	L	GF	GA	GD	Pts	Qualification
4	(The Football Association) Tottenham Hotspur	8	5	2	1	17	9	+8	17	Advance to round of 16 (seeded)
5	(German Football Association) Eintracht Frankfurt	8	5	1	2	14	10	+4	16	Advance to round of 16 (seeded)
6	(French Football Federation) Lyon	8	4	3	1	16	8	+8	15	Advance to round of 16 (seeded)
7	(Hellenic Football Federation) Olympiacos	8	4	3	1	9	3	+6	15	Advance to round of 16 (seeded)
8	(Scottish Football Association) Rangers	8	4	2	2	16	10	+6	14	Advance to round of 16 (seeded)

Source: UEFA
Rules for classification: League phase tiebreakers

Home team	Score	Away team
Lyon (France)	2–0	(Greece) Olympiacos
Rangers (Scotland)	1–4	(France) Lyon
Lyon (France)	0–1	(Turkey) Beşiktaş
TSG Hoffenheim (Germany)	2–2	(France) Lyon
Qarabağ (Azerbaijan)	1–4	(France) Lyon
Lyon (France)	3–2	(Germany) Eintracht Frankfurt
Fenerbahçe (Turkey)	0–0	(France) Lyon
Lyon (France)	1–1	(Bulgaria) Ludogorets Razgrad

===== Nice =====
Pos	Team	Pld	W	D	L	GF	GA	GD	Pts
32	(Latvian Football Federation) RFS	8	1	2	5	6	13	−7	5
33	(Bulgarian Football Union) Ludogorets Razgrad	8	0	4	4	4	11	−7	4
34	(Ukrainian Association of Football) Dynamo Kyiv	8	1	1	6	5	18	−13	4
35	(French Football Federation) Nice	8	0	3	5	7	16	−9	3
36	(Association of Football Federations of Azerbaijan) Qarabağ	8	1	0	7	6	20	−14	3

Source: UEFA
Rules for classification: League phase tiebreakers

Home team	Score	Away team
Nice (France)	1–1	(Spain) Real Sociedad
Lazio (Italy)	4–1	(France) Nice
Ferencváros (Hungary)	1–0	(France) Nice
Nice (France)	2–2	(Netherlands) Twente
Nice (France)	1–4	(Scotland) Rangers
Union Saint-Gilloise (Belgium)	2–1	(France) Nice
IF Elfsborg (Sweden)	1–0	(France) Nice
Nice (France)	1–1	(Norway) Bodø/Glimt

==== Knockout phase ====
===== Round of 16 =====
Team 1	Agg.	Team 2	1st leg	2nd leg
FCSB (Romania)	1–7	(France) Lyon	1–3	0–4

===== Qyarter-finals =====
Team 1	Agg.	Team 2	1st leg	2nd leg
Lyon (France)	6–7	(England) Manchester United	2–2	4–5 (a.e.t.)

=== UEFA Conference League ===
==== Qualifying phase and play-off round ====
===== Play-off round =====
Team 1	Agg.	Team 2	1st leg	2nd leg
Lens (France)	2–3	(Greece) Panathinaikos	2–1	0–2

=== UEFA Women's Champions League ===
==== Qualifying rounds ====
===== Round 1 =====
====== Semi-finals ======
Team 1	Score	Team 2
Paris FC (France)	9–0	(Austria) First Vienna

====== Final ======
Team 1	Score	Team 2
Sparta Prague (Czech Republic)	0–2	(France) Paris FC

===== Round 2 =====
Team 1	Agg.	Team 2	1st leg	2nd leg
Juventus (Italy)	5–2	(France) Paris Saint-Germain	3–1	2–1
Paris FC (France)	0–8	(England) Manchester City	0–5	0–3

==== Group stage ====
===== Group A =====
Pos	Team	Pld	W	D	L	GF	GA	GD	Pts	Qualification	LYO	WOL	ROM	GAL
1	(France) Lyon	6	6	0	0	19	1	+18	18	Advance to quarter-finals	—	1–0	4–1	3–0
2	(Germany) VfL Wolfsburg	6	3	0	3	16	5	+11	9 (Note: Wolfsburg 3 Pts, +4 GD; Roma 3 Pts, −4 GD.)	Advance to quarter-finals	0–2	—	6–1	5–0
3	(Italy) Roma	6	3	0	3	12	14	−2	9		0–3	1–0	—	3–0
4	(Turkey) Galatasaray	6	0	0	6	1	28	−27	0		0–6	0–5	1–6	—

Source: UEFA
Rules for classification: Group stage tiebreakers

==== Knockout phase ====
===== Quarter-finals =====
Team 1	Agg.	Team 2	1st leg	2nd leg
Bayern Munich (Germany)	1–6	(France) Lyon	0–2	1–4

===== Semi-finals =====
Team 1	Agg.	Team 2	1st leg	2nd leg
Arsenal (England)	5–3	(France) Lyon	1–2	4–1

=== UEFA Youth League ===
==== UEFA Champions League Path ====
===== Brest =====
Pos	Team	Pld	W	D	L	GF	GA	GD	Pts
32	(German Football Association) RB Leipzig	6	1	0	5	10	18	−8	3
33	(Italian Football Federation) Bologna	6	0	2	4	7	14	−7	2
34	(French Football Federation) Brest	6	0	2	4	5	16	−11	2
35	(Slovak Football Association) Slovan Bratislava	6	0	2	4	6	20	−14	2
36	(Football Association of the Czech Republic) Sparta Prague	6	0	1	5	4	15	−11	1

Source: UEFA
Rules for classification: League phase tiebreakers

Home team	Score	Away team
Brest (France)	1–4	(Austria) Sturm Graz
Red Bull Salzburg (Austria)	5–1	(France) Brest
Brest (France)	1–1	(Germany) Bayer Leverkusen
Sparta Prague (Czech Republic)	1–1	(France) Brest
Barcelona (Spain)	2–0	(France) Brest
Brest (France)	1–3	(Netherlands) PSV Eindhoven

===== Lille =====
Pos	Team	Pld	W	D	L	GF	GA	GD	Pts	Qualification
18	(German Football Association) Borussia Dortmund	6	2	2	2	11	8	+3	8	Advance to knockout phase (Pairing 1 to 6 unseeded)
19	(The Football Association) Liverpool	6	2	2	2	9	8	+1	8	Advance to knockout phase (Pairing 1 to 6 unseeded)
20	(French Football Federation) Lille	6	1	5	0	8	7	+1	8	Advance to knockout phase (Pairing 1 to 6 unseeded)
21	(Croatian Football Federation) Dinamo Zagreb	6	2	2	2	8	8	0	8	Advance to knockout phase (Pairing 1 to 6 unseeded)
22	(French Football Federation) Monaco	6	2	2	2	6	7	−1	8	Advance to knockout phase (Pairing 1 to 6 unseeded)

Source: UEFA
Rules for classification: League phase tiebreakers

Home team	Score	Away team
Sporting CP (Portugal)	2–2	(France) Lille
Lille (France)	2–1	(Spain) Real Madrid
Atlético Madrid (Spain)	1–1	(France) Lille
Lille (France)	0–0	(Italy) Juventus
Bologna (Italy)	2–2	(France) Lille
Lille (France)	1–1	(Austria) Sturm Graz

===== Monaco =====
Pos	Team	Pld	W	D	L	GF	GA	GD	Pts	Qualification
20	(French Football Federation) Lille	6	1	5	0	8	7	+1	8	Advance to knockout phase (Pairing 1 to 6 unseeded)
21	(Croatian Football Federation) Dinamo Zagreb	6	2	2	2	8	8	0	8	Advance to knockout phase (Pairing 1 to 6 unseeded)
22	(French Football Federation) Monaco	6	2	2	2	6	7	−1	8	Advance to knockout phase (Pairing 1 to 6 unseeded)
23	(French Football Federation) Paris Saint-Germain	6	2	1	3	14	13	+1	7	
24	(German Football Association) Bayer Leverkusen	6	2	1	3	7	9	−2	7	

Source: UEFA
Rules for classification: League phase tiebreakers

Home team	Score	Away team
Monaco (France)	4–3	(Spain) Barcelona
Dinamo Zagreb (Croatia)	1–0	(France) Monaco
Monaco (France)	1–1	(Serbia) Red Star Belgrade
Bologna (Italy)	0–0	(France) Monaco
Monaco (France)	1–0	(Portugal) Benfica
Arsenal (England)	2–0	(France) Monaco

===== Paris Saint-Germain =====
Pos	Team	Pld	W	D	L	GF	GA	GD	Pts	Qualification
21	(Croatian Football Federation) Dinamo Zagreb	6	2	2	2	8	8	0	8	Advance to knockout phase (Pairing 1 to 6 unseeded)
22	(French Football Federation) Monaco	6	2	2	2	6	7	−1	8	Advance to knockout phase (Pairing 1 to 6 unseeded)
23	(French Football Federation) Paris Saint-Germain	6	2	1	3	14	13	+1	7	
24	(German Football Association) Bayer Leverkusen	6	2	1	3	7	9	−2	7	
25	(Royal Dutch Football Association) PSV Eindhoven	6	1	3	2	8	9	−1	6	

Source: UEFA
Rules for classification: League phase tiebreakers

Home team	Score	Away team
Paris Saint-Germain (France)	0–2	(Spain) Girona
Arsenal (England)	1–0	(France) Paris Saint-Germain
Paris Saint-Germain (France)	3–3	(Netherlands) PSV Eindhoven
Paris Saint-Germain (France)	4–2	(Spain) Atlético Madrid
Bayern Munich (Germany)	2–5	(France) Paris Saint-Germain
Red Bull Salzburg (Austria)	3–2	(France) Paris Saint-Germain

==== Domestic Champions Path ====
===== Second round =====
Team 1	Agg.	Team 2	1st leg	2nd leg
Auxerre (France)	7–0	(Malta) Valletta	5–0	2–0

===== Third round =====
Team 1	Agg.	Team 2	1st leg	2nd leg
Auxerre (France)	1–3	(Germany) TSG Hoffenheim	1–2	0–1

==== Knockout phase ====
===== Round of 32 =====
Home team	Score	Away team
Inter Milan (Italy)	3–1	(France) Lille
Sporting CP (Portugal)	4–0	(France) Monaco

== League season ==
=== Men ===
==== Ligue 1 ====
Pos	Team	Pld	W	D	L	GF	GA	GD	Pts	Qualification or relegation
1	Paris Saint-Germain (C)	34	26	6	2	92	35	+57	84	Qualification for the Champions League league phase
2	Marseille	34	20	5	9	74	47	+27	65	Qualification for the Champions League league phase
3	Monaco	34	18	7	9	63	41	+22	61	Qualification for the Champions League league phase
4	Nice	34	17	9	8	66	41	+25	60	Qualification for the Champions League third qualifying round
5	Lille	34	17	9	8	52	36	+16	60	Qualification for the Europa League league phase (Note: Since the 2024–25 Coupe de France winners, Paris Saint-Germain, qualified for the Champions League via league position, the Europa League berth awarded to the cup winners was passed to the sixth-placed team and the Conference League berth was passed to the seventh-placed team.)
6	Lyon	34	17	6	11	65	46	+19	57	Qualification for the Europa League league phase
7	Strasbourg	34	16	9	9	56	44	+12	57	Qualification for the Conference League play-off round
8	Lens	34	15	7	12	42	39	+3	52	
9	Brest	34	15	5	14	52	59	−7	50	
10	Toulouse	34	11	9	14	44	43	+1	42	
11	Auxerre	34	11	9	14	48	51	−3	42	
12	Rennes	34	13	2	19	51	50	+1	41	
13	Nantes	34	8	12	14	39	52	−13	36	
14	Angers	34	10	6	18	32	53	−21	36	
15	Le Havre	34	10	4	20	40	71	−31	34	
16	Reims (R)	34	8	9	17	33	47	−14	33	Qualification for the relegation play-offs
17	Saint-Étienne (R)	34	8	6	20	39	77	−38	30	Relegation to Ligue 2
18	Montpellier (R)	34	4	4	26	23	79	−56	16	Relegation to Ligue 2

Source: Ligue 1
Rules for classification: 1) Points; 2) Goal difference; 3) Head-to-head points; 4) Head-to-head goal difference; 5) Head-to-head goals scored; 6) Head-to-head away goals scored; 7) Goals scored; 8) Away goals scored; 9) Fair-play points (Note: Head-to-head record is used only after all the matches between the teams in question have been played).
(C) Champions; (R) Relegated

==== Ligue 2 ====
Pos	Team	Pld	W	D	L	GF	GA	GD	Pts	Promotion or Relegation
1	Lorient (C, P)	34	22	5	7	68	31	+37	71	Promotion to Ligue 1
2	Paris FC (P)	34	21	6	7	55	33	+22	69	Promotion to Ligue 1
3	Metz (O, P)	34	18	11	5	63	34	+29	65	Qualification for promotion play-offs final
4	Dunkerque	34	17	5	12	47	40	+7	56	Qualification for promotion play-offs semi-final
5	Guingamp	34	17	4	13	57	45	+12	55	Qualification for promotion play-offs semi-final
6	Annecy	34	14	9	11	42	42	0	51	
7	Laval	34	14	8	12	44	38	+6	50	
8	Bastia	34	11	15	8	43	37	+6	48	
9	Grenoble	34	13	7	14	43	44	−1	46	
10	Troyes	34	13	5	16	36	34	+2	44	
11	Amiens	34	13	4	17	38	50	−12	43	
12	Ajaccio (Note: Ajaccio were relegated due to financial reasons.) (D, R)	34	12	6	16	30	42	−12	42	Administrative relegation to Régional 2
13	Pau	34	10	12	12	39	53	−14	42	
14	Rodez	34	9	12	13	56	54	+2	39	
15	Red Star	34	9	11	14	37	51	−14	38	
16	Clermont (O)	34	7	12	15	30	46	−16	33	Qualification for relegation play-offs
17	Martigues (Note: Martigues were originally going to be relegated to Régional 1 as the DNCG excluded them from national competitions. However, Martigues were then relegated further down to Départemental 1, the ninth tier of French football, before eventually getting relegated once again down to Départemental 3, the eleventh tier) (D, R)	34	9	5	20	29	56	−27	32	Administrative relegation to Départemental 3
18	Caen (R)	34	5	7	22	31	58	−27	22	Relegation to Championnat National

Source: Ligue 2
Rules for classification: 1) Points; 2) Goal difference; 3) Number of goals scored; 4) Head-to-head goal difference; 5) Fair play points
(C) Champions; (D) Disqualified; (O) Play-off winners; (P) Promoted; (R) Relegated

==== Championnat National ====
Pos	Team	Pld	W	D	L	GF	GA	GD	Pts	Promotion or relegation
1	Nancy (C, P)	32	20	5	7	54	28	+26	65	Promotion to Ligue 2
2	Le Mans (P)	32	17	7	8	48	34	+14	58	Promotion to Ligue 2
3	Boulogne (P)	32	15	11	6	46	34	+12	56	Qualification to promotion play-offs (Note: Despite losing the promotion play-offs, Boulogne were promoted after Ajaccio were administratively relegated.)
4	Dijon	32	12	11	9	37	35	+2	47	
5	Bourg-Péronnas	32	12	10	10	26	28	−2	46	
6	Aubagne	32	13	6	13	43	37	+6	45	
7	Orléans	32	12	9	11	43	41	+2	45	
8	Concarneau	32	11	9	12	48	46	+2	42	
9	Valenciennes	32	10	12	10	38	36	+2	42	
10	Rouen	32	9	13	10	42	39	+3	40	
11	Quevilly-Rouen	32	11	7	14	31	41	−10	40	
12	Sochaux	32	8	14	10	29	30	−1	38	
13	Versailles	32	8	12	12	41	44	−3	36	
14	Paris 13 Atletico	32	7	14	11	32	38	−6	35	
15	Villefranche	32	7	13	12	29	37	−8	34	
16	Châteauroux	32	8	9	15	40	62	−22	33	Spared from relegation (Note: Châteauroux were spared from relegation after Martigues were administratively relegated from Ligue 2.)
17	Nîmes (R)	32	6	10	16	24	41	−17	28	Relegation to Championnat National 2

Source: soccerway
Rules for classification: 1) head-to-head results; 2) head-to-head goal difference; 3) goal difference; 4) goals scored; 5) fair play points
(C) Champions; (P) Promoted; (R) Relegated

==== Championnat National 2 ====
Pos	Team	Pld	W	D	L	GF	GA	GD	Pts	Promotion or relegation
1	Le Puy (C, P)	30	17	8	5	48	17	+31	59	Promotion to National
2	Cannes	30	15	10	5	57	30	+27	55	
3	Toulon	30	13	9	8	44	35	+9	48	
4	Grasse	30	11	12	7	40	29	+11	45	
5	Hyères	30	11	12	7	34	25	+9	45	
6	Angoulême	30	10	13	7	28	28	0	43	
7	Saint-Priest	30	11	9	10	32	33	−1	42	
8	Fréjus Saint-Raphaël	30	9	12	9	33	36	−3	38 (Note: Fréjus Saint-Raphaël were deducted one point.)	
9	Istres	30	11	5	14	40	48	−8	38	
10	Rumilly-Vallières	30	8	13	9	35	35	0	37	
11	Andrézieux	30	9	10	11	35	26	+9	37	
12	Marignane GCB	30	9	8	13	29	43	−14	35	
13	Bergerac	30	9	7	14	34	49	−15	34	
14	GOAL FC	30	10	6	14	33	53	−20	32 (Note: GOAL FC were deducted six points. The deduction was then reduced to 4 points.)	Spared from relegation
15	Jura Sud (R)	30	5	14	11	28	36	−8	29	Relegation to National 3
16	Anglet (R)	30	4	8	18	25	50	−25	20	Relegation to National 3

Source: soccerway
Rules for classification: 1) points; 2) head-to-head results; 3) head-to-head goal difference; 4) goal difference; 5) number of goals scored; 6) fair play points; 7) draw
(C) Champions; (P) Promoted; (R) Relegated
Notes:

Pos	Team	Pld	W	D	L	GF	GA	GD	Pts	Promotion or relegation
1	Stade Briochin (C, P)	30	18	5	7	49	34	+15	59	Promotion to National
2	Les Herbiers	30	16	7	7	53	24	+29	55	
3	Saint-Malo	30	14	11	5	43	27	+16	53	
4	Bordeaux	30	14	6	10	38	32	+6	48	
5	La Roche	30	13	9	8	42	27	+15	48	
6	Blois	30	13	8	9	46	36	+10	47	
7	Saint-Colomban Locminé	30	13	7	10	39	33	+6	46	
8	Bourges	30	10	11	9	46	43	+3	41	
9	Avranches	30	11	8	11	46	43	+3	41	
10	Dinan Léhon	30	10	8	12	38	49	−11	38	
11	Châteaubriant	30	9	10	11	36	43	−7	37	
12	Saint-Pryvé Saint-Hilaire	30	9	9	12	40	37	+3	36	
13	Poitiers	30	8	9	13	36	48	−12	33	
14	Granville	30	8	8	14	36	47	−11	32	Spared from relegation
15	Saumur	30	7	7	16	28	51	−23	28	Spared from relegation
16	Le Poiré-sur-Vie (R)	30	3	5	22	18	58	−40	14	Relegation to National 3

Source: soccerway
Rules for classification: 1) points; 2) head-to-head results; 3) head-to-head goal difference; 4) goal difference; 5) number of goals scored; 6) fair play points; 7) draw
(C) Champions; (P) Promoted; (R) Relegated

Pos	Team	Pld	W	D	L	GF	GA	GD	Pts	Promotion or relegation
1	Fleury (C, P)	30	17	8	5	48	24	+24	59	Promotion to National
2	FC 93	30	16	5	9	42	35	+7	53	
3	Chambly	30	13	12	5	48	31	+17	48 (Note: Chambly Oise were deducted three points.)	
4	Thionville	30	13	8	9	48	39	+9	47	
5	Créteil	30	11	9	10	35	29	+6	42	
6	Balagne	30	11	11	8	54	44	+10	41 (Note: Balagne were deducted three points.)	
7	Beauvais	30	11	8	11	33	31	+2	41	
8	Furiani-Agliani	30	10	13	7	36	35	+1	41 (Note: Furiani-Agliani were deducted two points.)	
9	Feignies Aulnoye	30	11	7	12	42	35	+7	40	
10	Biesheim	30	10	10	10	42	37	+5	40	
11	Épinal	30	9	10	11	40	40	0	37	
12	Haguenau	30	10	7	13	38	44	−6	37	
13	Chantilly	30	8	12	10	36	46	−10	36	
14	Wasquehal	30	9	4	17	26	47	−21	31	Spared from relegation
15	Aubervilliers (R)	30	4	12	14	41	53	−12	24	Relegation to National 3
16	Villers-Houlgate (R)	30	5	8	17	25	64	−39	23	Relegation to National 3

Source: soccerway
Rules for classification: 1) points; 2) head-to-head results; 3) head-to-head goal difference; 4) goal difference; 5) number of goals scored; 6) fair play points; 7) draw
(C) Champions; (P) Promoted; (R) Relegated

=== Women ===
==== Première Ligue ====
===== Regular season =====
Pos	Team	Pld	W	D	L	GF	GA	GD	Pts	Qualification or relegation
1	Lyon (C)	22	20	2	0	92	7	+85	62	Qualification for the play-offs
2	Paris Saint-Germain	22	16	4	2	57	14	+43	52	Qualification for the play-offs
3	Paris FC	22	13	6	3	58	19	+39	45	Qualification for the play-offs
4	Dijon	22	13	4	5	40	24	+16	43	Qualification for the play-offs
5	Fleury	22	9	6	7	40	30	+10	33	
6	Montpellier	22	10	3	9	34	36	−2	33	
7	Nantes	22	5	8	9	17	30	−13	23	
8	Le Havre	22	5	6	11	22	42	−20	21	
9	Strasbourg	22	3	8	11	22	39	−17	17	
10	Saint-Étienne	22	5	2	15	16	62	−46	17	
11	Reims (R)	22	4	3	15	24	49	−25	15	Relegation to the Seconde Ligue
12	Guingamp (R)	22	3	0	19	15	85	−70	9	Relegation to the Seconde Ligue

Source: FFF.fr
Rules for classification: 1) points; 2) head-to-head points; 3) head-to-head goal difference; 4) goal difference; 5) goals scored
(C) Champions; (R) Relegated

===== Play-offs =====
The top four teams from the regular season qualify for the final play-offs. In the semi-finals, the team that finished first plays the 4th place team. And the runner-up plays the 3rd place.

The winner of the play-offs is crowned the champion for the 2024–25 season. Both finalists secure a direct qualification to the 2025–26 Champions League league stage.

Semi-finals
1	Lyon	4
4	Dijon	1
2	Paris Saint-Germain	3
3	Paris FC	0

Final
Lyon	3
Paris Saint-Germain	0

==== Seconde Ligue ====
Pos	Team	Pld	W	D	L	GF	GA	GD	Pts	Qualification or relegation
1	Marseille	20	14	3	3	46	22	+24	45 (Note: Olympique de Marseille finished ahead of RC Lens on head-to-head points: Marseille 4, Lens 1; Lens 2–2 Marseille, Marseille 1–0 Lens.)	Promotion to 2025–26 Première Ligue
2	Lens	20	14	3	3	54	23	+31	45	Promotion to 2025–26 Première Ligue
3	Toulouse	20	11	4	5	36	24	+12	37	
4	Le Mans	20	9	4	7	29	24	+5	31	
5	Saint-Malo	20	7	6	7	30	33	−3	27	
6	Metz	20	6	7	7	26	25	+1	25	
7	Lille	20	7	3	10	38	35	+3	24	
8	Thonon Evian	20	5	7	8	20	34	−14	22	
9	Nice	20	5	3	12	21	51	−30	18	
10	Rodez	20	4	5	11	26	43	−17	17	
11	Orléans	20	5	1	14	25	37	−12	16	Relegation to 2025–26 Division 3 Féminine

Source: FFF.fr
Rules for classification: 1) points; 2) head-to-head points; 3) head-to-head goal difference; 4) goal difference; 5) goals scored

== Cup competitions ==
=== Men ===
==== 2024–25 Coupe de France ====
===== Final =====
24 May 2025
21:00 CEST

Paris Saint-Germain	3–0	Reims
Barcola 16', 19'; Hakimi 43'	Report

Stade de France, Saint-Denis
Attendance: 77,101
Referee: Benoît Bastien

==== 2024 Trophée des Champions ====
5 January 2025
19:30 AST

Paris Saint-Germain	1–0	Monaco
Dembélé 90+2'	Report

Stadium 974, Doha
Attendance: 39,682
Referee: Willy Delajod

=== Women ===
==== 2024–25 Coupe de France Féminine ====
===== Final =====
3 May 2025
14:00

Paris FC (1)	0–0	(1) Paris Saint-Germain
	Report
Penalties
Greboval (penalty scored); Matéo (penalty missed); Korošec (penalty scored); Bussy (penalty scored); Le Mouël (penalty scored); Sissoko (penalty scored)	5–4	(penalty scored) Leuchter; (penalty scored) Katoto; (penalty scored) Karchaoui; (penalty missed) Albert; (penalty scored) Mbock Bathy; (penalty missed) Le Guilly

Stade de l'Épopée, Calais
Attendance: 8,108
Referee: Audrey Gerbel

== International competitions ==
=== FIFA Club World Cup ===
==== Group B ====
Pos	Team	Pld	W	D	L	GF	GA	GD	Pts	Qualification
1	(France) Paris Saint-Germain	3	2	0	1	6	1	+5	6 (Note: Tied on head-to-head points (3). Head-to-head goal difference: Paris Saint-Germain +3, Botafogo 0, Atlético Madrid –3.)	Advance to knockout stage
2	(Brazil) Botafogo	3	2	0	1	3	2	+1	6	Advance to knockout stage
3	(Spain) Atlético Madrid	3	2	0	1	4	5	−1	6	
4	(United States) Seattle Sounders FC	3	0	0	3	2	7	−5	0	

Source: FIFA

==== Knockout stage ====
===== Round of 16 =====
29 June 2025	Paris Saint-Germain (France)	4–0	(United States) Inter Miami CF	Atlanta
12:00 pm EDT	Neves 6', 39'; Avilés 44' (o.g.); Hakimi 45+3'	Report		Stadium: Mercedes-Benz Stadium; Attendance: 65,574; Referee: Wilton Sampaio (Brazil)
