= 2024–25 UEFA Youth League knockout phase =

European football tournament

The 2024–25 UEFA Youth League knockout phase began on 11 February 2025 with the round of 32 and concluded with the final on 28 April 2025 at Colovray Stadium in Nyon, Switzerland, to decide the champions of the 2024–25 UEFA Youth League. The top 22 teams from the UEFA Champions League Path as well as 10 winners of the Domestic Champions Path qualified for the knockout phase.

Times are CET/CEST, (Note: CET (UTC+1) for dates up to 30 March 2025 (up to round of 16), and CEST (UTC+2) for dates thereafter (quarter-finals, semi-finals and final).) as listed by UEFA (local times, if different, are in parentheses).

== Qualified teams ==
The following 32 teams qualified for the knockout phase.

Qualified teams
UEFA Champions League Path	Domestic Champions Path
1. (Italy) Inter Milan; 2. (Portugal) Sporting CP; 3. (Austria) Red Bull Salzburg; 4. (Spain) Barcelona; 5. (Germany) VfB Stuttgart; 6. (Spain) Real Madrid; 7. (Italy) Atalanta; 8. (Spain) Atlético Madrid; 9. (Portugal) Benfica; 10. (Italy) Juventus; 11. (England) Manchester City; 12. (Spain) Girona; 13. (Germany) Bayern Munich; 14. (Ukraine) Shakhtar Donetsk; 15. (England) Aston Villa; 16. (Austria) Sturm Graz; 17. (Scotland) Celtic; 18. (Germany) Borussia Dortmund; 19. (England) Liverpool; 20. (France) Lille; 21. (Croatia) Dinamo Zagreb; 22. (France) Monaco	(Ukraine) Dynamo Kyiv; (Netherlands) AZ; (Hungary) Puskás Akadémia; (Germany) TSG Hoffenheim; (Denmark) Midtjylland; (Spain) Real Betis; (Croatia) Lokomotiva Zagreb; (Greece) Olympiacos; (Austria) Rapid Wien; (Turkey) Trabzonspor

== Schedule ==
Knockout phase schedule
Phase	Round	Draw date	Match dates
Knockout phase	Round of 32	20 December 2024	11–12 February 2025
Knockout phase	Round of 16	14 February 2025	4–5 March 2025
Knockout phase	Quarter-finals	14 February 2025	1–2 April 2025
Knockout phase	Semi-finals	14 February 2025	25 April 2025 at Colovray Stadium, Nyon
Knockout phase	Final	14 February 2025	28 April 2025 at Colovray Stadium, Nyon

== Bracket ==
Round of 32
(Austria) Red Bull Salzburg (p)	1 (4)
(Scotland) Celtic	1 (2)
(Austria) Rapid Wien	1
(Spain) Atlético Madrid	2
(Croatia) Lokomotiva Zagreb	1 (3)
(Austria) Sturm Graz (p)	1 (5)
(Greece) Olympiacos	1
(Spain) Girona	0
(Turkey) Trabzonspor	1
(Italy) Juventus	0
(Ukraine) Dynamo Kyiv	3 (6)
(Italy) Atalanta (p)	3 (7)
(Spain) Real Betis	0
(Germany) Bayern Munich	1
(Italy) Inter Milan	3
(France) Lille	1
(Spain) Real Madrid	2
(Germany) Borussia Dortmund	0
(Netherlands) AZ (p)	2 (4)
(Portugal) Benfica	2 (3)
(Germany) TSG Hoffenheim	5
(Ukraine) Shakhtar Donetsk	1
(Denmark) Midtjylland	2 (4)
(England) Manchester City (p)	2 (5)
(Portugal) Sporting CP	4
(France) Monaco	0
(Germany) VfB Stuttgart (p)	2 (5)
(England) Liverpool	2 (3)
(Hungary) Puskás Akadémia	1
(England) Aston Villa	2
(Spain) Barcelona (p)	2 (5)
(Croatia) Dinamo Zagreb	2 (3)

Round of 16
(Austria) Red Bull Salzburg	2
(Spain) Atlético Madrid	1
(Austria) Sturm Graz	1 (4)
(Greece) Olympiacos	1 (5)
(Turkey) Trabzonspor	0 (5)
(Italy) Atalanta	0 (3)
(Germany) Bayern Munich	1 (4)
(Italy) Inter Milan	1 (5)
(Spain) Real Madrid	0
(Netherlands) AZ	2
(Germany) TSG Hoffenheim	1
(England) Manchester City	2
(Portugal) Sporting CP	2
(Germany) VfB Stuttgart	3
(England) Aston Villa	1
(Spain) Barcelona	3

Quarter-finals
(Austria) Red Bull Salzburg	1
(Greece) Olympiacos	0
(Turkey) Trabzonspor	1
(Italy) Inter Milan	0
(Netherlands) AZ	1
(England) Manchester City	0
(Germany) VfB Stuttgart	1
(Spain) Barcelona	2

Semi-finals
25 April – Nyon
(Austria) Red Bull Salzburg	1
(Turkey) Trabzonspor	2
25 April – Nyon
(Netherlands) AZ	0
(Spain) Barcelona	1

Final
28 April – Nyon
(Turkey) Trabzonspor	1
(Spain) Barcelona	4

== Round of 32 ==
The draw for the round of 32 was held on 20 December 2024.

=== Seeding ===
In the draw, the top 6 teams from the UEFA Champions League Path were seeded and paired against the teams finished in 17th to 22nd place, while the 10 Domestic Champions Path winners were seeded and paired against teams ranked 7th to 16th. The seeded teams played the matches at home. In the draw, teams from the same national association could not be drawn against each other. To create the ties, teams finishing 1st to 16th in the UEFA Champions League Path were automatically allocated to the tie corresponding to their position in the final standings, with their unseeded (pairings 1 to 6) or seeded (pairings 7 to 16) opponents then drawn.

Draw pots
Pairings 1 to 6		Pairings 7 to 16	
Seeded	Unseeded (Bowl 1)	Seeded (Bowl 2)	Unseeded
(Italy) Inter Milan; (Portugal) Sporting CP; (Austria) Red Bull Salzburg; (Spain) Barcelona; (Germany) VfB Stuttgart; (Spain) Real Madrid	(Scotland) Celtic; (Germany) Borussia Dortmund; (England) Liverpool; (France) Lille; (Croatia) Dinamo Zagreb; (France) Monaco	(Ukraine) Dynamo Kyiv; (Netherlands) AZ; (Hungary) Puskás Akadémia; (Germany) TSG Hoffenheim; (Denmark) Midtjylland; (Spain) Real Betis; (Croatia) Lokomotiva Zagreb; (Greece) Olympiacos; (Austria) Rapid Wien; (Turkey) Trabzonspor	(Italy) Atalanta; (Spain) Atlético Madrid; (Portugal) Benfica; (Italy) Juventus; (England) Manchester City; (Spain) Girona; (Germany) Bayern Munich; (Ukraine) Shakhtar Donetsk; (England) Aston Villa; (Austria) Sturm Graz

=== Summary ===
The matches were played on 11 and 12 February 2025.

Round of 32
Home team	Score	Away team
Inter Milan (Italy)	3–1	(France) Lille
Sporting CP (Portugal)	4–0	(France) Monaco
Red Bull Salzburg (Austria)	1–1 (4–2 p)	(Scotland) Celtic
Barcelona (Spain)	2–2 (5–3 p)	(Croatia) Dinamo Zagreb
VfB Stuttgart (Germany)	2–2 (5–3 p)	(England) Liverpool
Real Madrid (Spain)	2–0	(Germany) Borussia Dortmund
Dynamo Kyiv (Ukraine)	3–3 (6–7 p)	(Italy) Atalanta
Rapid Wien (Austria)	1–2	(Spain) Atlético Madrid
AZ (Netherlands)	2–2 (4–3 p)	(Portugal) Benfica
Trabzonspor (Turkey)	1–0	(Italy) Juventus
Midtjylland (Denmark)	2–2 (4–5 p)	(England) Manchester City
Olympiacos (Greece)	1–0	(Spain) Girona
Real Betis (Spain)	0–1	(Germany) Bayern Munich
TSG Hoffenheim (Germany)	5–1	(Ukraine) Shakhtar Donetsk
Puskás Akadémia (Hungary)	1–2	(England) Aston Villa
Lokomotiva Zagreb (Croatia)	1–1 (3–5 p)	(Austria) Sturm Graz

=== Matches ===
11 February 2025
16:00

Inter Milan (Italy)	3–1	(France) Lille
Spinaccè 32', 35'; Mosconi 58'	Report	Lachaab 89'

Youth Development Training Center, Milan
Attendance: 281
Referee: Menelaos Antoniou (Cyprus)

12 February 2025
14:00 (13:00 UTC+0)

Sporting CP (Portugal)	4–0	(France) Monaco
Silva 8'; Gonçalves 29', 83'; Mendonça 46'	Report

Stadium Aurélio Pereira, Alcochete
Attendance: 408
Referee: Radoslav Gidzhenov (Bulgaria)

12 February 2025
14:00

Red Bull Salzburg (Austria)	1–1	(Scotland) Celtic
Moser 57'	Report	Ure 69'
Penalties
Hussauf (penalty scored); Camara (penalty scored); Moser (penalty scored); Aguilar (penalty scored)	4–2	(penalty missed) Cummings; (penalty scored) Ure; (penalty scored) Turley; (penalty missed) Bonnar

Red Bull Akademie, Salzburg
Attendance: 450
Referee: Oliver Reitala (Finland)

12 February 2025
14:00

Barcelona (Spain)	2–2	(Croatia) Dinamo Zagreb
Alba 9'; Junyent 44'	Report	Jakirović 6', 30'
Penalties
Pradas (penalty scored); Alba (penalty scored); Virgili (penalty scored); Rodríguez (penalty scored); Hernández (penalty scored)	5–3	(penalty scored) Vlahović; (penalty missed) Baković; (penalty scored) Zebić; (penalty scored) Šutalo

Estadi Johan Cruyff, Sant Joan Despí
Attendance: 618
Referee: Stefan Ebner (Austria)

11 February 2025
14:00

VfB Stuttgart (Germany)	2–2	(England) Liverpool
Bujupi 8'; Korkut 19'	Report	Morrison 26'; Kone-Doherty 45+2'
Penalties
Korkut (penalty scored); Bujupi (penalty scored); Hajdini (penalty scored); Penna (penalty scored); Boakye (penalty scored)	5–3	(penalty scored) Morrison; (penalty scored) Laffey; (penalty missed) Nallo; (penalty scored) Figueroa

Gazi-Stadion auf der Waldau, Stuttgart
Attendance: 4,150
Referee: Bulat Sariyev (Kazakhstan)

12 February 2025
16:00

Real Madrid (Spain)	2–0	(Germany) Borussia Dortmund
De Llanos 44', 64'	Report

Estadio Alfredo Di Stéfano, Madrid
Attendance: 845
Referee: Joey Kooij (Netherlands)

11 February 2025
11:00 (13:00 UTC+3)

Dynamo Kyiv (Ukraine)	3–3	(Italy) Atalanta
Camara 23' (o.g.); Ponomarenko 28'; Kremchanin 45'	Report	Bonsignori 12'; Damiano 63'; Fiogbé 70'
Penalties
Kremchanin (penalty missed); Zakharchenko (penalty scored); Ponomarenko (penalty scored); Peikrishvili (penalty missed); Bilyi (penalty scored); Andreyko (penalty scored); Liusin (penalty scored); Hubenko (penalty scored); Tretiak (penalty missed)	6–7	(penalty scored) Simonetto; (penalty scored) Camara; (penalty scored) Tavanti; (penalty missed) Damiano; (penalty missed) Fiogbé; (penalty scored) Steffanoni; (penalty scored) Arrigoni; (penalty scored) Gobbo; (penalty scored) Idele

Arslan Zeki Demirci Spor Kompleksi – Emir Hotels 1, Manavgat, Turkey (Note: Due to the Russian invasion of Ukraine, Ukrainian teams are required to play their home matches at neutral venues until further notice.)
Attendance: 135
Referee: Mikkel Redder (Denmark)

12 February 2025
18:30

Rapid Wien (Austria)	1–2	(Spain) Atlético Madrid
Živković 22'	Report	Monserrate 38'; Janneh 61'

Weststadion, Vienna
Attendance: 3,343
Referee: Ishmael Barbara (Malta)

11 February 2025
14:00

AZ (Netherlands)	2–2	(Portugal) Benfica
Bouziane 46'; Smits 52'	Report	Rego 3'; Varela 89'
Penalties
Van den Ban (penalty scored); Dijkstra (penalty scored); Oerip (penalty missed); Boogaard (penalty scored); Inge (penalty scored)	4–3	(penalty scored) Rego; (penalty missed) Varela; (penalty scored) Moreira; (penalty missed) Ferreira; (penalty scored) Gomes

AZ Training Centre, Wijdewormer
Attendance: 1,125
Referee: Mohammad Usman Aslam (Norway)

12 February 2025
16:00 (18:00 UTC+3)

Trabzonspor (Turkey)	1–0	(Italy) Juventus
Turan 61'	Report

Şenol Güneş Sports Complex, Trabzon
Attendance: 10,575
Referee: Joakim Östling (Sweden)

12 February 2025
14:00

Midtjylland (Denmark)	2–2	(England) Manchester City
Emefile 41'; J. Heskey 79' (o.g.)	Report	Samuel 51'; Warhurst 81'
Penalties
Bjerge (penalty scored); Overgaard (penalty scored); Pimpong (penalty missed); Lodberg (penalty scored); Johannesen (penalty scored)	4–5	(penalty scored) Mukasa; (penalty scored) Warhurst; (penalty scored) McFarlane; (penalty scored) J. Heskey; (penalty scored) Whatmuff

Ikast Stadion, Ikast
Attendance: 1,412
Referee: Cláudio Filipe Ruivo Pereira (Portugal)

12 February 2025
16:00 (17:00 UTC+2)

Olympiacos (Greece)	1–0	(Spain) Girona
Pnevmonidis 70'	Report

Olympiacos FC Training Centre, Piraeus
Attendance: 1,255
Referee: Jasper Vergoote (Belgium)

11 February 2025
16:00

Real Betis (Spain)	0–1	(Germany) Bayern Munich
	Report	Chávez 47'

Ciudad Deportiva Luis del Sol, Seville
Attendance: 1,300
Referee: Miloš Milanović (Serbia)

11 February 2025
18:00

TSG Hoffenheim (Germany)	5–1	(Ukraine) Shakhtar Donetsk
Dağdeviren 5'; Onos 44' (pen.); Micheler 55' (pen.); Wähling 82', 90+4' (pen.)	Report	Smetana 74'

Dietmar-Hopp-Stadion, Sinsheim
Attendance: 1,556
Referee: Patrik Kolarić (Croatia)

12 February 2025
16:00

Puskás Akadémia (Hungary)	1–2	(England) Aston Villa
Mondovics 80'	Report	Cotcher 46'; Pavey 54'

Pancho Aréna, Felcsút
Attendance: 581
Referee: Zorbay Küçük (Turkey)

12 February 2025
12:00

Lokomotiva Zagreb (Croatia)	1–1	(Austria) Sturm Graz
Đurković 72'	Report	Osayantin 35'
Penalties
Reić (penalty scored); Katić (penalty missed); Đurković (penalty scored); Canjuga (penalty scored)	3–5	(penalty scored) Mustafic; (penalty scored) Schopp; (penalty scored) Hödl; (penalty scored) Osayantin; (penalty scored) Wolf

Sport Centre Rudes, Zagreb
Attendance: 350
Referee: Lukasz Kuzma (Poland)

== Round of 16 ==
=== Summary ===
The draw was conducted on 14 February 2025 at 13:00 CET in the UEFA headquarters in Nyon. The round of 16 was played over one leg on 4 and 5 March 2025.

Round of 16
Home team	Score	Away team
Trabzonspor (Turkey)	0–0 (5–3 p)	(Italy) Atalanta
Sturm Graz (Austria)	1–1 (4–5 p)	(Greece) Olympiacos
Bayern Munich (Germany)	1–1 (4–5 p)	(Italy) Inter Milan
Red Bull Salzburg (Austria)	2–1	(Spain) Atlético Madrid
Real Madrid (Spain)	0–2	(Netherlands) AZ
Sporting CP (Portugal)	2–3	(Germany) VfB Stuttgart
TSG Hoffenheim (Germany)	1–2	(England) Manchester City
Aston Villa (England)	1–3	(Spain) Barcelona

=== Matches ===
5 March 2025
18:00 (20:00 UTC+3)

Trabzonspor (Turkey)	0–0	(Italy) Atalanta
	Report
Penalties
Malkoçoğlu (penalty scored); Çakıroğlu (penalty scored); Terzi (penalty scored); Karahan (penalty scored); Tibukoğlu (penalty scored)	5–3	(penalty scored) Simonetto; (penalty scored) Bono; (penalty missed) Cakolli; (penalty scored) Comi

Şenol Güneş Sports Complex, Trabzon
Attendance: 13,102
Referee: Sander van der Eijk (Netherlands)

5 March 2025
17:30

Sturm Graz (Austria)	1–1	(Greece) Olympiacos
Koita 90+3'	Report	Papakanellos 61'
Penalties
Mustafic (penalty scored); Schopp (penalty scored); Wolf (penalty scored); Hödl (penalty scored); Kern (penalty missed)	4–5	(penalty scored) Prekates; (penalty scored) Dama; (penalty scored) Toufakis; (penalty scored) Filis; (penalty scored) Liatsikouras

Merkur Arena, Liebenau
Attendance: 5,531
Referee: Mohammad Al-Emara (Finland)

5 March 2025
18:00

Bayern Munich (Germany)	1–1	(Italy) Inter Milan
Chávez 20'	Report	Alexiou 90+4'
Penalties
Sadat (penalty scored); Rüger (penalty scored); Kusi-Asare (penalty scored); Puljić (penalty scored); Chávez (penalty missed)	4–5	(penalty scored) Berenbruch; (penalty scored) Spinaccè; (penalty scored) De Pieri; (penalty scored) Zouin; (penalty scored) Lavelli

FC Bayern Campus, Munich
Attendance: 1,643
Referee: Antoni Bandić (Bosnia and Herzegovina)

4 March 2025
16:00

Red Bull Salzburg (Austria)	2–1	(Spain) Atlético Madrid
Baidoo 56'; Sulzbacher 62' (pen.)	Report	Hueso 66'

Red Bull Akademie, Salzburg
Attendance: 320
Referee: Jakob Sundberg (Denmark)

5 March 2025
16:00

Real Madrid (Spain)	0–2	(Netherlands) AZ
	Report	Bouziane 29'; Smits 87'

Estadio Alfredo Di Stéfano, Madrid
Attendance: 849
Referee: Miloš Milanović (Serbia)

5 March 2025
16:00 (15:00 UTC+0)

Sporting CP (Portugal)	2–3	(Germany) VfB Stuttgart
Gonçalves 2'; Nel 90+6'	Report	Boakye 34'; Korkut 43'; Lüers 76'

Stadium Aurélio Pereira, Alcochete
Attendance: 655
Referee: Joonas Jaanovits (Estonia)

5 March 2025
16:00

TSG Hoffenheim (Germany)	1–2	(England) Manchester City
Behrens 37'	Report	Warhurst 23'; R. Heskey 45+1'

Dietmar-Hopp-Stadion, Sinsheim
Attendance: 3,365
Referee: Jasper Vergoote (Belgium)

4 March 2025
18:00 (17:00 UTC+0)

Aston Villa (England)	1–3	(Spain) Barcelona
Borland 56' (pen.)	Report	Junyent 15'; Pradas 20'; Virgili 79'

Villa Park, Birmingham
Attendance: 1,013
Referee: Ante Čulina (Croatia)

== Quarter-finals ==
=== Summary ===
The draw was conducted on 14 February 2025 at 13:00 CET in the UEFA headquarters in Nyon. The quarter-finals were played over one leg on 1 and 2 April 2025.

Quarter-finals
Home team	Score	Away team
AZ (Netherlands)	1–0	(England) Manchester City
VfB Stuttgart (Germany)	1–2	(Spain) Barcelona
Red Bull Salzburg (Austria)	1–0	(Greece) Olympiacos
Trabzonspor (Turkey)	1–0	(Italy) Inter Milan

=== Matches ===
2 April 2025
18:00

AZ (Netherlands)	1–0	(England) Manchester City
Van der Klaauw 90+4'	Report

AZ Training Centre, Wijdewormer
Attendance: 2,000
Referee: Ivana Martinčić (Croatia)

2 April 2025
16:00

VfB Stuttgart (Germany)	1–2	(Spain) Barcelona
Tsigkas 29'	Report	Pradas 40'; Virgili 53'

Gazi-Stadion auf der Waldau, Stuttgart
Attendance: 9,500
Referee: Vassilis Fotias (Greece)

1 April 2025
16:00

Red Bull Salzburg (Austria)	1–0	(Greece) Olympiacos
Aguilar 11'	Report

Red Bull Akademie, Salzburg
Attendance: 425
Referee: Andrea Colombo (Italy)

1 April 2025
16:00 (17:00 UTC+3)

Trabzonspor (Turkey)	1–0	(Italy) Inter Milan
Terzi 77'	Report

Şenol Güneş Sports Complex, Trabzon
Attendance: 40,368
Referee: Alessandro Dudic (Switzerland)

== Semi-finals ==
=== Summary ===
The draw was conducted on 14 February 2025 at 13:00 CET in the UEFA headquarters in Nyon. The semi-finals will be played over one leg on 25 April 2025.

Semi-finals
Team 1	Score	Team 2
AZ (Netherlands)	0–1	(Spain) Barcelona
Red Bull Salzburg (Austria)	1–2	(Turkey) Trabzonspor

=== Matches ===
25 April 2025
18:00

AZ (Netherlands)	0–1	(Spain) Barcelona
	Report	Hernández 7' (pen.)

Colovray Stadium, Nyon
Attendance: 1,899
Referee: Mohammad Al-Emara (Finland)

25 April 2025
14:00

Red Bull Salzburg (Austria)	1–2	(Turkey) Trabzonspor
Mellberg 85'	Report	Turan 73'; Başkan 89'

Colovray Stadium, Nyon
Attendance: 2,485
Referee: Jasper Vergoote (Belgium)

== Final ==
The final was played on 28 April 2025 at Colovray Stadium, Nyon.

28 April 2025
18:00

Trabzonspor (Turkey)	1–4	(Spain) Barcelona
Tibukoğlu 88'	Report	Diarra 11', 68'; Cuenca 18'; Alba 57'

Colovray Stadium, Nyon
Attendance: 3,081
Referee: Andrea Colombo (Italy)
