= Benjamin Boakye =

German footballer (born 2005)

Personal information
- Full name: Benjamin Bediako Boakye
- Date of birth: 7 March 2005 (age 21)
- Place of birth: Pforzheim, Germany
- Height: 1.80 m (5 ft 11 in)
- Position: Winger

Team information
- Current team: Arminia Bielefeld
- Number: 27

Youth career
- –2014: TSV Sielmingen
- 2014–2015: Stuttgarter Kickers
- 2016–2024: VfB Stuttgart

Senior career*
Years	Team	Apps	(Gls)
2023–2025	VfB Stuttgart II	42	(6)
2024–2025	VfB Stuttgart	0	(0)
2025–	Arminia Bielefeld	25	(1)

International career^{‡}
2022	Germany U18	2	(0)
- * Club domestic league appearances and goals as of 18 May 2026 ‡ National team caps and goals as of 27 November 2022

Benjamin Bediako Boakye (born 7 March 2005) is a German professional footballer who plays as a winger for 2. Bundesliga club Arminia Bielefeld.

== Early life ==
Boakye was born on 7 March 2005 in Pforzheim, Germany. A native of Filderstadt, Germany he is of Ghanaian descent through his parents.

== Club career ==
As a youth player, Boakye joined the youth academy of TSV Sielmingen. In 2014, he joined the youth academy of Stuttgarter Kickers. One year later, he joined the youth academy of VfB Stuttgart, where he played in the UEFA Youth League, and was promoted to the club's reserve team in 2023 before being promoted to their senior team in 2024. German newspaper Stuttgarter Zeitung wrote in 2023 that he was "one of the hottest talents in VfB Stuttgart's talent pool". On 27 November 2024, he debuted for them during a 1–5 away loss to Red Star Belgrade in the UEFA Champions League.

On 1 July 2025, Boakye signed with Arminia Bielefeld in 2. Bundesliga.

== International career ==
Boakye is a Germany youth international and is eligible to represent Ghana internationally through his parents. On 25 November 2022, he debuted for the Germany national under-18 football team during a 1–1 away friendly draw with the Czech Republic national under-18 football team.
