= Efe Korkut =

Turkish footballer (born 2006)

Personal information
- Full name: Efe Korkut Martín
- Date of birth: 23 June 2006 (age 20)
- Place of birth: San Sebastián, Spain
- Height: 1.83 m (6 ft 0 in)
- Position: Midfielder

Team information
- Current team: Bilbao Athletic
- Number: 20

Youth career
- FSV Waiblingen
- 2021–2022: 1. FC Nürnberg
- 2022–2024: VfB Stuttgart

Senior career*
Years	Team	Apps	(Gls)
2024–2026	VfB Stuttgart II	18	(1)
2026–	Bilbao Athletic	12	(1)

International career^{‡}
2023	Turkey U17	2	(0)
2023–2024	Turkey U18	8	(2)
2025–	Turkey U19	3	(1)
- * Club domestic league appearances and goals as of 9 June 2026 ‡ National team caps and goals as of 15:26, 7 July 2025 (UTC)

Efe Korkut Martín (born 23 June 2006) is a professional footballer who plays as a midfielder for Primera Federación club Bilbao Athletic, having begun his career with VfB Stuttgart II. Born in Spain and raised largely in Germany, he is a youth international for Turkey.

== Club career ==
Korkut is a product of the youth academies of the German clubs FSV Waiblingen, 1. FC Nürnberg and VfB Stuttgart. On 19 July 2024, he signed a contract with Stuttgart until 2026, and was promoted to their reserves in the 3. Liga.

Following speculation over his future for more than a year, on 1 February 2026 Athletic Bilbao confirmed that they had signed Korkut on a contract running to June 2028 with optional extensions; he moved to Spain immediately and was assigned to reserve team Bilbao Athletic.

== International career ==
Korkut was born in Spain to a German-born father of Turkish descent and a Spanish mother. He holds triple Turkish, Spanish and German nationality. Korkut is a youth international for Turkey, having played from the Under-17s to the Under-19s.

== Personal life ==
Korkut was born in San Sebastián (Gipuzkoa, Basque Country). His father is the football manager and former player Tayfun Korkut. His mother is Basque.
