= Romeo Hueso =

Spanish footballer (born 2007)

Personal information
- Full name: Romeo Hueso Moya
- Date of birth: 3 April 2007 (age 19)
- Place of birth: Xàtiva, Spain
- Height: 1.78 m (5 ft 10 in)
- Positions: Defender; midfielder; winger

Team information
- Current team: Atlético Madrid B
- Number: 14

Youth career
- 2013–2023: Valencia
- 2023–2026: Atlético Madrid

Senior career*
| Years | Team | Apps | (Gls) |
| 2025– | Atlético Madrid B | 10 | (0) |

International career^{‡}
| 2023 | Spain U17 | 3 | (0) |
| 2024 | Spain U18 | 3 | (0) |
- * Club domestic league appearances and goals as of 25 May 2026 ‡ National team caps and goals as of 15 January 2025

Romeo Hueso Moya (born 3 April 2007) is a Spanish professional footballer who plays as a defender, midfielder, or winger for Atlético Madrid B.

== Early life ==
Hueso was born on 3 April 2007. Born in Xàtiva, Spain, he has a sister.

== Club career ==
As a youth player, Hueso joined the youth academy of La Liga side Valencia. Following his stint there, he joined the youth academy of La Liga side Atlético Madrid ahead of the 2023–24 season and was promoted to the club's reserve team in 2025.

== International career ==
Hueso is a Spain youth international. On 10 October 2024, he debuted for the Spain national under-18 football team during a 4–0 away friendly win over the Romania national under-18 football team.

== Style of play ==
Hueso plays as a defender. Spanish newspaper Diario AS wrote in 2024 that he is "a right-sided player who can play as a wing-back, central midfielder, or winger... with his dribbling skills, ability to beat defenders, and blistering speed".
