= 2024–25 UEFA Champions League knockout phase =

Europe premier club football tournament

The 2024–25 UEFA Champions League knockout phase began on 11 February with the knockout phase play-offs and ended on 31 May 2025 with the final at the Allianz Arena in Munich, Germany, to decide the champions of the 2024–25 UEFA Champions League. A total of 24 teams competed in the knockout phase, with 16 entering in the play-offs and 8 receiving a bye to the round of 16.

Times are CET/CEST, (Note: CET (UTC+1) for dates up to 29 March 2025 (knockout phase play-offs and round of 16), and CEST (UTC+2) for dates thereafter (quarter-finals, semi-finals and final).) as listed by UEFA (local times, if different, are in parentheses).

== Qualified teams ==
The knockout phase involved the top 24 teams that qualified from the league phase. The top 8 teams received a bye to the round of 16, while teams finishing in positions 9 to 24 entered the knockout phase play-offs.

Entering the round of 16 (seeded)
Pos	Team
1	(England) Liverpool
2	(Spain) Barcelona
3	(England) Arsenal
4	(Italy) Inter Milan
5	(Spain) Atlético Madrid
6	(Germany) Bayer Leverkusen
7	(France) Lille
8	(England) Aston Villa

Entering the play-offs (seeded)
Pos	Team
9	(Italy) Atalanta
10	(Germany) Borussia Dortmund
11	(Spain) Real Madrid
12	(Germany) Bayern Munich
13	(Italy) Milan
14	(Netherlands) PSV Eindhoven
15	(France) Paris Saint-Germain
16	(Portugal) Benfica

Entering the play-offs (unseeded)
Pos	Team
17	(France) Monaco
18	(France) Brest
19	(Netherlands) Feyenoord
20	(Italy) Juventus
21	(Scotland) Celtic
22	(England) Manchester City
23	(Portugal) Sporting CP
24	(Belgium) Club Brugge

== Format ==
Each tie in the knockout phase, apart from the final, was played over two legs, with each team playing one leg at home. The team that scored more goals on aggregate over the two legs advanced to the next round. If the aggregate score was level, then 30 minutes of extra time were played (the away goals rule was not applied). If the score was still level at the end of extra time, the winners were decided by a penalty shoot-out. In the final, which was played as a single match, if the score was level at the end of normal time, extra time would be played, followed by a penalty shoot-out if the score was still level.

=== Draw procedure ===
In the knockout phase, there was no country protection, with teams from the same association able to face each other in any round. Teams could also face opponents they played during the league phase.

The mechanism of the draws for each round was as follows:

- In the draw for the knockout phase play-offs, the eight teams finishing the league phase in positions 9–16 were seeded, and the eight teams finishing the league phase in positions 17–24 were unseeded. The draw was split into four sections based on the predetermined bracket, with the seeded teams in each section drawn against one of their two possible unseeded opponents. The seeded teams hosted the second leg.
- In the draw for the round of 16, the eight teams finishing the league phase in positions 1–8 were seeded, and the eight winners of the knockout phase play-offs were unseeded. Again, the draw was split into four sections based on the predetermined bracket, with the seeded teams in each section drawn against one of their two possible unseeded opponents. The seeded teams hosted the second leg.
- In the quarter-finals and semi-finals, the exact match pairings were predetermined based on the tournament bracket. A draw was conducted only to determine which team plays the first leg at home. The winner of semi-final 1 was designated as the "home" team for the final (for administrative purposes as it was played at a neutral venue).

In the knockout phase, teams from the same or nearby cities were not scheduled to play at home on the same day or on consecutive days, due to logistics and crowd control. To avoid such scheduling conflict, several adjustments were made: For the knockout phase play-offs and the round of 16, if the two teams were drawn to play at home for the same leg, the home match of the team that had the lower league phase ranking was moved from either Tuesday or Wednesday from a regularly scheduled time to an earlier time slot, to a different day, and/or at an alternative venue without clashing any other competition. For the quarter-finals and semi-finals, the order of legs of the tie involving the team with the lowest priority was reversed from the original draw.

=== Predetermined pairings ===
The bracket structure for the knockout phase was partially fixed in advance using seeding, with a symmetrical pattern on both sides. Teams' positions in the bracket were determined by their final standings in the league phase, ensuring that higher-ranked teams face lower-ranked opponents in earlier rounds. As a result, certain sets of teams, such as the top two from the league phase, could not meet until the final.

The structure of each side of the bracket can be summarised as follows, with the exact pairings of the play-offs and round of 16 determined by a draw: (Note: The draws determined the exact play-off and round of 16 pairings for each side of the bracket, which mirrored each other. For example, if the team in 9th was drawn against 23rd in the play-offs, the team in 10th would be drawn against 24th on the other side of the bracket.)

- Knockout phase play-offs
  - Pairing I: 9/10 vs 23/24
  - Pairing II: 11/12 vs 21/22
  - Pairing III: 13/14 vs 19/20
  - Pairing IV: 15/16 vs 17/18
- Round of 16
  - Pairing A: 1/2 vs Winners IV
  - Pairing B: 3/4 vs Winners III
  - Pairing C: 5/6 vs Winners II
  - Pairing D: 7/8 vs Winners I
- Quarter-finals
  - Pairing 1: Winners A vs Winners D
  - Pairing 2: Winners B vs Winners C
- Semi-finals: Winners 1 vs Winners 2

== Schedule ==
The schedule was as follows (all draws were held at the UEFA headquarters in Nyon, Switzerland).

Round	Draw date	First leg	Second leg
Knockout phase play-offs	31 January 2025, 12:00 CET	11–12 February 2025	18–19 February 2025
Round of 16	21 February 2025, 12:00 CET	4–5 March 2025	11–12 March 2025
Quarter-finals	21 February 2025, 12:00 CET	8–9 April 2025	15–16 April 2025
Semi-finals	21 February 2025, 12:00 CET	29–30 April 2025	6–7 May 2025
Final	—N/a	31 May 2025 at Allianz Arena, Munich	

== Bracket ==
Knockout phase play-offs
20	(Italy) Juventus	2	1	3
14	(Netherlands) PSV Eindhoven (a.e.t.)	1	3	4
22	(England) Manchester City	2	1	3
11	(Spain) Real Madrid	3	3	6
18	(France) Brest	0	0	0
15	(France) Paris Saint-Germain	3	7	10
24	(Belgium) Club Brugge	2	3	5
9	(Italy) Atalanta	1	1	2
17	(France) Monaco	0	3	3
16	(Portugal) Benfica	1	3	4
23	(Portugal) Sporting CP	0	0	0
10	(Germany) Borussia Dortmund	3	0	3
21	(Scotland) Celtic	1	1	2
12	(Germany) Bayern Munich	2	1	3
19	(Netherlands) Feyenoord	1	1	2
13	(Italy) Milan	0	1	1

Round of 16
14	(Netherlands) PSV Eindhoven	1	2	3
3	(England) Arsenal	7	2	9
11	(Spain) Real Madrid (p)	2	0	2 (4)
5	(Spain) Atlético Madrid	1	1	2 (2)
15	(France) Paris Saint-Germain (p)	0	1	1 (4)
1	(England) Liverpool	1	0	1 (1)
24	(Belgium) Club Brugge	1	0	1
8	(England) Aston Villa	3	3	6
16	(Portugal) Benfica	0	1	1
2	(Spain) Barcelona	1	3	4
10	(Germany) Borussia Dortmund	1	2	3
7	(France) Lille	1	1	2
12	(Germany) Bayern Munich	3	2	5
6	(Germany) Bayer Leverkusen	0	0	0
19	(Netherlands) Feyenoord	0	1	1
4	(Italy) Inter Milan	2	2	4

Quarter-finals
3	(England) Arsenal	3	2	5
11	(Spain) Real Madrid	0	1	1
15	(France) Paris Saint-Germain	3	2	5
8	(England) Aston Villa	1	3	4
2	(Spain) Barcelona	4	1	5
10	(Germany) Borussia Dortmund	0	3	3
12	(Germany) Bayern Munich	1	2	3
4	(Italy) Inter Milan	2	2	4

Semi-finals
3	(England) Arsenal	0	1	1
15	(France) Paris Saint-Germain	1	2	3
2	(Spain) Barcelona	3	3	6
4	(Italy) Inter Milan (a.e.t.)	3	4	7

Final
31 May – Munich
15	(France) Paris Saint-Germain	5
4	(Italy) Inter Milan	0

== Knockout phase play-offs ==
The draw for the knockout phase play-offs was held on 31 January 2025, 12:00 CET.

=== Seeding ===
The draw was split into four seeded and four unseeded pots, based on the predetermined pairings for the knockout phase. Teams were allocated based on their final position in the league phase. Teams in positions 9 to 16 were seeded (playing the second legs at home), while teams in positions 17 to 24 were unseeded. The draw began with the unseeded teams, allocating them all to a tie. Once completed, all the seeded teams were drawn into a tie as their opponents.

9/10 vs 23/24		11/12 vs 21/22	
Seeded	Unseeded	Seeded	Unseeded
(Italy) Atalanta; (Germany) Borussia Dortmund	(Portugal) Sporting CP; (Belgium) Club Brugge	(Spain) Real Madrid; (Germany) Bayern Munich	(Scotland) Celtic; (England) Manchester City

13/14 vs 19/20		15/16 vs 17/18	
Seeded	Unseeded	Seeded	Unseeded
(Italy) Milan; (Netherlands) PSV Eindhoven	(Netherlands) Feyenoord; (Italy) Juventus	(France) Paris Saint-Germain; (Portugal) Benfica	(France) Monaco; (France) Brest

=== Summary ===
The first legs were played on 11 and 12 February, and the second legs were played on 18 and 19 February 2025.

Team 1	Agg.	Team 2	1st leg	2nd leg
Brest (France)	0–10	(France) Paris Saint-Germain	0–3	0–7
Club Brugge (Belgium)	5–2	(Italy) Atalanta	2–1	3–1
Manchester City (England)	3–6	(Spain) Real Madrid	2–3	1–3
Juventus (Italy)	3–4	(Netherlands) PSV Eindhoven	2–1	1–3 (a.e.t.)
Monaco (France)	3–4	(Portugal) Benfica	0–1	3–3
Sporting CP (Portugal)	0–3	(Germany) Borussia Dortmund	0–3	0–0
Celtic (Scotland)	2–3	(Germany) Bayern Munich	1–2	1–1
Feyenoord (Netherlands)	2–1	(Italy) Milan	1–0	1–1

=== Matches ===
11 February 2025
18:45

Brest (France)	0–3	(France) Paris Saint-Germain
	Report	Vitinha 21' (pen.); Dembélé 45', 66'

Stade de Roudourou, Guingamp (Note: Brest played their home match at Stade de Roudourou, Guingamp, instead of their regular stadium, Stade Francis-Le Blé, Brest, which did not meet UEFA requirements.)
Attendance: 15,831
Referee: Irfan Peljto (Bosnia and Herzegovina)
19 February 2025
21:00

Paris Saint-Germain (France)	7–0	(France) Brest
Barcola 20'; Kvaratskhelia 39'; Vitinha 59'; Doué 64'; Mendes 69'; Ramos 76'; Mayulu 86'	Report

Parc des Princes, Paris
Attendance: 47,211
Referee: Michael Oliver (England)

Paris Saint-Germain won 10–0 on aggregate.

12 February 2025
18:45

Club Brugge (Belgium)	2–1	(Italy) Atalanta
Jutglà 15'; Nilsson 90+4' (pen.)	Report	Pašalić 41'

Jan Breydel Stadium, Bruges
Attendance: 24,242
Referee: Halil Umut Meler (Turkey)
18 February 2025
21:00

Atalanta (Italy)	1–3	(Belgium) Club Brugge
Lookman 46'	Report	Talbi 3', 27'; Jutglà 45+3'

Stadio Atleti Azzurri d'Italia, Bergamo
Attendance: 21,727
Referee: Felix Zwayer (Germany)

Club Brugge won 5–2 on aggregate.

11 February 2025
21:00 (20:00 UTC+0)

Manchester City (England)	2–3	(Spain) Real Madrid
Haaland 19', 80' (pen.)	Report	Mbappé 60'; Brahim 86'; Bellingham 90+2'

City of Manchester Stadium, Manchester
Attendance: 52,081
Referee: Clément Turpin (France)
19 February 2025
21:00

Real Madrid (Spain)	3–1	(England) Manchester City
Mbappé 4', 33', 61'	Report	González 90+2'

Santiago Bernabéu, Madrid
Attendance: 77,023
Referee: István Kovács (Romania)

Real Madrid won 6–3 on aggregate.

11 February 2025
21:00

Juventus (Italy)	2–1	(Netherlands) PSV Eindhoven
McKennie 34'; Mbangula 82'	Report	Perišić 56'

Juventus Stadium, Turin
Attendance: 39,886
Referee: Daniel Siebert (Germany)
19 February 2025
21:00

PSV Eindhoven (Netherlands)	3–1 (a.e.t.)	(Italy) Juventus
Perišić 53'; Saibari 74'; Flamingo 98'	Report	Weah 63'

Philips Stadion, Eindhoven
Attendance: 35,000
Referee: Slavko Vinčić (Slovenia)

PSV Eindhoven won 4–3 on aggregate.

12 February 2025
21:00

Monaco (France)	0–1	(Portugal) Benfica
	Report	Pavlidis 48'

Stade Louis II, Monaco
Attendance: 12,159
Referee: Maurizio Mariani (Italy)
18 February 2025
21:00 (20:00 UTC+0)

Benfica (Portugal)	3–3	(France) Monaco
Aktürkoğlu 22'; Pavlidis 76' (pen.); Kökçü 84'	Report	Minamino 32'; Ben Seghir 51'; Ilenikhena 81'

Estádio da Luz, Lisbon
Attendance: 60,776
Referee: Glenn Nyberg (Sweden)

Benfica won 4–3 on aggregate.

11 February 2025
21:00 (20:00 UTC+0)

Sporting CP (Portugal)	0–3	(Germany) Borussia Dortmund
	Report	Guirassy 60'; Groß 68'; Adeyemi 82'

Estádio José Alvalade, Lisbon
Attendance: 41,543
Referee: Espen Eskås (Norway)
19 February 2025
18:45

Borussia Dortmund (Germany)	0–0	(Portugal) Sporting CP
	Report

Westfalenstadion, Dortmund
Attendance: 80,300
Referee: Davide Massa (Italy)

Borussia Dortmund won 3–0 on aggregate.

12 February 2025
21:00 (20:00 UTC+0)

Celtic (Scotland)	1–2	(Germany) Bayern Munich
Maeda 79'	Report	Olise 45'; Kane 49'

Celtic Park, Glasgow
Attendance: 57,406
Referee: Jesús Gil Manzano (Spain)
18 February 2025
21:00

Bayern Munich (Germany)	1–1	(Scotland) Celtic
Davies 90+4'	Report	Kühn 63'

Allianz Arena, Munich
Attendance: 75,000
Referee: Benoît Bastien (France)

Bayern Munich won 3–2 on aggregate.

12 February 2025
21:00

Feyenoord (Netherlands)	1–0	(Italy) Milan
Paixão 3'	Report

De Kuip, Rotterdam
Attendance: 45,000
Referee: José María Sánchez Martínez (Spain)
18 February 2025
18:45

Milan (Italy)	1–1	(Netherlands) Feyenoord
Giménez 1'	Report	Carranza 73'

San Siro, Milan
Attendance: 54,749
Referee: Szymon Marciniak (Poland)

Feyenoord won 2–1 on aggregate.

== Round of 16 ==
The draw for the round of 16 was held on 21 February 2025, 12:00 CET.

=== Seeding ===
As the bracket was fixed, the draw contained only four seeded pots, based on the predetermined pairings for the knockout phase, with the top-eight teams allocated based on their final position in the league phase. Teams in positions 1 to 8 were seeded (playing the second legs at home), while the bracket positions of the winners of the knockout phase play-offs (unseeded) were predetermined. The top-eight teams were drawn into the bracket against one of their two possible opponents.

1/2 vs 15/16/17/18		3/4 vs 13/14/19/20	
Seeded	Predetermined	Seeded	Predetermined
(England) Liverpool; (Spain) Barcelona	(France) Paris Saint-Germain; (Portugal) Benfica	(England) Arsenal; (Italy) Inter Milan	(Netherlands) PSV Eindhoven; (Netherlands) Feyenoord

5/6 vs 11/12/21/22		7/8 vs 9/10/23/24	
Seeded	Predetermined	Seeded	Predetermined
(Spain) Atlético Madrid; (Germany) Bayer Leverkusen	(Spain) Real Madrid; (Germany) Bayern Munich	(France) Lille; (England) Aston Villa	(Belgium) Club Brugge; (Germany) Borussia Dortmund

=== Summary ===
The first legs were played on 4 and 5 March, and the second legs were played on 11 and 12 March 2025.

In the Atlético Madrid v Real Madrid second leg, Julián Alvarez's penalty shoot-out goal was controversially ruled a miss by VAR due to an accidental double touch as he slipped while kicking. IFAB clarified in June 2025 that in such cases the kick should be retaken.

Team 1	Agg.	Team 2	1st leg	2nd leg
Paris Saint-Germain (France)	1–1 (4–1 p)	(England) Liverpool	0–1	1–0 (a.e.t.)
Club Brugge (Belgium)	1–6	(England) Aston Villa	1–3	0–3
Real Madrid (Spain)	2–2 (4–2 p)	(Spain) Atlético Madrid	2–1	0–1 (a.e.t.)
PSV Eindhoven (Netherlands)	3–9	(England) Arsenal	1–7	2–2
Benfica (Portugal)	1–4	(Spain) Barcelona	0–1	1–3
Borussia Dortmund (Germany)	3–2	(France) Lille	1–1	2–1
Bayern Munich (Germany)	5–0	(Germany) Bayer Leverkusen	3–0	2–0
Feyenoord (Netherlands)	1–4	(Italy) Inter Milan	0–2	1–2

=== Matches ===
5 March 2025
21:00

Paris Saint-Germain (France)	0–1	(England) Liverpool
	Report	Elliott 87'

Parc des Princes, Paris
Attendance: 47,511
Referee: Davide Massa (Italy)
11 March 2025
21:00 (20:00 UTC+0)

Liverpool (England)	0–1 (a.e.t.)	(France) Paris Saint-Germain
	Report	Dembélé 12'
Penalties
Salah (penalty scored); Núñez (penalty missed); Jones (penalty missed)	1–4	(penalty scored) Vitinha; (penalty scored) Ramos; (penalty scored) Dembélé; (penalty scored) Doué

Anfield, Liverpool
Attendance: 59,765
Referee: István Kovács (Romania)

1–1 on aggregate; Paris Saint-Germain won 4–1 on penalties.

4 March 2025
18:45

Club Brugge (Belgium)	1–3	(England) Aston Villa
De Cuyper 12'	Report	Bailey 3'; Mechele 82' (o.g.); Asensio 88' (pen.)

Jan Breydel Stadium, Bruges
Attendance: 26,890
Referee: João Pinheiro (Portugal)
12 March 2025
21:00 (20:00 UTC+0)

Aston Villa (England)	3–0	(Belgium) Club Brugge
Asensio 50', 61'; Maatsen 57'	Report

Villa Park, Birmingham
Attendance: 42,461
Referee: Daniel Siebert (Germany)

Aston Villa won 6–1 on aggregate.

4 March 2025
21:00

Real Madrid (Spain)	2–1	(Spain) Atlético Madrid
Rodrygo 4'; Brahim 55'	Report	Alvarez 32'

Santiago Bernabéu, Madrid
Attendance: 77,261
Referee: Clément Turpin (France)
12 March 2025
21:00

Atlético Madrid (Spain)	1–0 (a.e.t.)	(Spain) Real Madrid
Gallagher 1'	Report
Penalties
Sørloth (penalty scored); Alvarez (penalty missed); Correa (penalty scored); Llorente (penalty missed)	2–4	(penalty scored) Mbappé; (penalty scored) Bellingham; (penalty scored) Valverde; (penalty missed) Vázquez; (penalty scored) Rüdiger

Metropolitano Stadium, Madrid
Attendance: 69,304
Referee: Szymon Marciniak (Poland)

2–2 on aggregate; Real Madrid won 4–2 on penalties.

4 March 2025
21:00

PSV Eindhoven (Netherlands)	1–7	(England) Arsenal
Lang 43' (pen.)	Report	Timber 18'; Nwaneri 21'; Merino 31'; Ødegaard 47', 73'; Trossard 48'; Calafiori 85'

Philips Stadion, Eindhoven
Attendance: 34,400
Referee: Jesús Gil Manzano (Spain)
12 March 2025
21:00 (20:00 UTC+0)

Arsenal (England)	2–2	(Netherlands) PSV Eindhoven
Zinchenko 6'; Rice 37'	Report	Perišić 18'; Driouech 70'

Emirates Stadium, London
Attendance: 59,410
Referee: Rade Obrenovič (Slovenia)

Arsenal won 9–3 on aggregate.

5 March 2025
21:00 (20:00 UTC+0)

Benfica (Portugal)	0–1	(Spain) Barcelona
	Report	Raphinha 61'

Estádio da Luz, Lisbon
Attendance: 62,437
Referee: Felix Zwayer (Germany)
11 March 2025
18:45

Barcelona (Spain)	3–1	(Portugal) Benfica
Raphinha 11', 42'; Yamal 27'	Report	Otamendi 13'

Estadi Olímpic Lluís Companys, Barcelona (Note: Barcelona played their home matches at Estadi Olímpic Lluís Companys, Barcelona, instead of their regular stadium, Camp Nou, Barcelona, which was being renovated.)
Attendance: 47,111
Referee: François Letexier (France)

Barcelona won 4–1 on aggregate.

4 March 2025
21:00

Borussia Dortmund (Germany)	1–1	(France) Lille
Adeyemi 22'	Report	Haraldsson 68'

Westfalenstadion, Dortmund
Attendance: 81,365
Referee: José María Sánchez Martínez (Spain)
12 March 2025
18:45

Lille (France)	1–2	(Germany) Borussia Dortmund
David 5'	Report	Can 54' (pen.); Beier 65'

Stade Pierre-Mauroy, Villeneuve-d'Ascq
Attendance: 48,042
Referee: Sandro Schärer (Switzerland)

Borussia Dortmund won 3–2 on aggregate.

5 March 2025
21:00

Bayern Munich (Germany)	3–0	(Germany) Bayer Leverkusen
Kane 9', 75' (pen.); Musiala 54'	Report

Allianz Arena, Munich
Attendance: 75,000
Referee: Michael Oliver (England)
11 March 2025
21:00

Bayer Leverkusen (Germany)	0–2	(Germany) Bayern Munich
	Report	Kane 52'; Davies 71'

BayArena, Leverkusen
Attendance: 30,210
Referee: Slavko Vinčić (Slovenia)

Bayern Munich won 5–0 on aggregate.

5 March 2025
18:45

Feyenoord (Netherlands)	0–2	(Italy) Inter Milan
	Report	Thuram 38'; L. Martínez 50'

De Kuip, Rotterdam
Attendance: 43,789
Referee: Espen Eskås (Norway)
11 March 2025
21:00

Inter Milan (Italy)	2–1	(Netherlands) Feyenoord
Thuram 8'; Çalhanoğlu 51' (pen.)	Report	Moder 42' (pen.)

San Siro, Milan
Attendance: 55,536
Referee: Ivan Kružliak (Slovakia)

Inter Milan won 4–1 on aggregate.

== Quarter-finals ==
The draw for the order of the quarter-final legs was held on 21 February 2025, 12:00 CET, after the round of 16 draw.

=== Summary ===
The first legs were played on 8 and 9 April, and the second legs were played on 15 and 16 April 2025.

Team 1	Agg.	Team 2	1st leg	2nd leg
Paris Saint-Germain (France)	5–4	(England) Aston Villa	3–1	2–3
Arsenal (England)	5–1	(Spain) Real Madrid	3–0	2–1
Barcelona (Spain)	5–3	(Germany) Borussia Dortmund	4–0	1–3
Bayern Munich (Germany)	3–4	(Italy) Inter Milan	1–2	2–2

=== Matches ===
9 April 2025
21:00

Paris Saint-Germain (France)	3–1	(England) Aston Villa
Doué 39'; Kvaratskhelia 49'; Mendes 90+2'	Report	Rogers 35'

Parc des Princes, Paris
Attendance: 47,511
Referee: Maurizio Mariani (Italy)
15 April 2025
21:00 (20:00 UTC+1)

Aston Villa (England)	3–2	(France) Paris Saint-Germain
Tielemans 34'; McGinn 55'; Konsa 57'	Report	Hakimi 11'; Mendes 27'

Villa Park, Birmingham
Attendance: 42,535
Referee: José María Sánchez Martínez (Spain)

Paris Saint-Germain won 5–4 on aggregate.

8 April 2025
21:00 (20:00 UTC+1)

Arsenal (England)	3–0	(Spain) Real Madrid
Rice 58', 70'; Merino 75'	Report

Emirates Stadium, London
Attendance: 60,110
Referee: Irfan Peljto (Bosnia and Herzegovina)
16 April 2025
21:00

Real Madrid (Spain)	1–2	(England) Arsenal
Vinícius 67'	Report	Saka 65'; Martinelli 90+3'

Santiago Bernabéu, Madrid
Attendance: 77,073
Referee: François Letexier (France)

Arsenal won 5–1 on aggregate.

9 April 2025
21:00

Barcelona (Spain)	4–0	(Germany) Borussia Dortmund
Raphinha 25'; Lewandowski 48', 66'; Yamal 77'	Report

Estadi Olímpic Lluís Companys, Barcelona
Attendance: 49,760
Referee: Espen Eskås (Norway)
15 April 2025
21:00

Borussia Dortmund (Germany)	3–1	(Spain) Barcelona
Guirassy 11' (pen.), 49', 76'	Report	Bensebaini 54' (o.g.)

Westfalenstadion, Dortmund
Attendance: 81,365
Referee: Maurizio Mariani (Italy)

Barcelona won 5–3 on aggregate.

8 April 2025
21:00

Bayern Munich (Germany)	1–2	(Italy) Inter Milan
Müller 85'	Report	L. Martínez 38'; Frattesi 88'

Allianz Arena, Munich
Attendance: 75,000
Referee: Sandro Schärer (Switzerland)
16 April 2025
21:00

Inter Milan (Italy)	2–2	(Germany) Bayern Munich
L. Martínez 58'; Pavard 61'	Report	Kane 52'; Dier 76'

San Siro, Milan
Attendance: 75,625
Referee: Slavko Vinčić (Slovenia)

Inter Milan won 4–3 on aggregate.

== Semi-finals ==
The draw for the order of the semi-final legs was held on 21 February 2025, 12:00 CET, after the round of 16 and quarter-final draws.

=== Summary ===
The first legs were played on 29 and 30 April, and the second legs were played on 6 and 7 May 2025.

Team 1	Agg.	Team 2	1st leg	2nd leg
Arsenal (England)	1–3	(France) Paris Saint-Germain	0–1	1–2
Barcelona (Spain)	6–7	(Italy) Inter Milan	3–3	3–4 (a.e.t.)

=== Matches ===
29 April 2025
21:00 (20:00 UTC+1)

Arsenal (England)	0–1	(France) Paris Saint-Germain
	Report	Dembélé 4'

Emirates Stadium, London
Attendance: 59,664
Referee: Slavko Vinčić (Slovenia)
7 May 2025
21:00

Paris Saint-Germain (France)	2–1	(England) Arsenal
Fabián 27'; Hakimi 72'	Report	Saka 76'

Parc des Princes, Paris
Attendance: 47,511
Referee: Felix Zwayer (Germany)

Paris Saint-Germain won 3–1 on aggregate.

30 April 2025
21:00

Barcelona (Spain)	3–3	(Italy) Inter Milan
Yamal 24'; Torres 38'; Sommer 65' (o.g.)	Report	Thuram 1'; Dumfries 21', 64'

Estadi Olímpic Lluís Companys, Barcelona
Attendance: 50,314
Referee: Clément Turpin (France)
6 May 2025
21:00

Inter Milan (Italy)	4–3 (a.e.t.)	(Spain) Barcelona
L. Martínez 21'; Çalhanoğlu 45+1' (pen.); Acerbi 90+3'; Frattesi 99'	Report	García 54'; Olmo 60'; Raphinha 87'

San Siro, Milan
Attendance: 75,504
Referee: Szymon Marciniak (Poland)

Inter Milan won 7–6 on aggregate.

== Final ==
The final was played on 31 May 2025 at the Allianz Arena in Munich. The winner of semi-final 1 was designated as the "home" team for administrative purposes.

31 May 2025
21:00

Paris Saint-Germain (France)	5–0	(Italy) Inter Milan
Hakimi 12'; Doué 20', 63'; Kvaratskhelia 73'; Mayulu 86'	Report

Allianz Arena, Munich
Attendance: 64,327
Referee: István Kovács (Romania)
