= 2024–25 Olympique Lyonnais season =

Olympique Lyonnais
2024–25 season
- President: John Textor
- Head coach: Pierre Sage (until 27 January); Paulo Fonseca (from 31 January); Jorge Maciel (caretaker in Ligue 1, from 5 March)
- Stadium: Parc Olympique Lyonnais
- Ligue 1: 6th
- Coupe de France: Round of 32
- UEFA Europa League: Quarter-finals
- Top goalscorer: League: Alexandre Lacazette (15); All: Alexandre Lacazette (19)
- Highest home attendance: 58,082 vs Saint-Étienne (10 November 2024)
- Lowest home attendance: 24,412 vs Olympiacos (26 September 2024)
- Average home league attendance: 50,994 (86.2% of capacity)
- Biggest win: Le Havre 0–4 Lyon (20 October 2024); Lyon 4–0 Reims (9 February 2025); Lyon 4–0 FCSB (13 March 2025)
- Biggest defeat: Rennes 3–0 Lyon (18 August 2024)
Home colours	Away colours	Third colours

The 2024–25 season was the 75th season in the history of Olympique Lyonnais and their 36th consecutive season in the top flight. In addition to the domestic league, Lyon participated in this season's editions of the Coupe de France and the UEFA Europa League.

On 15 November 2024, it was announced by the DNCG that Lyon would be provisionally demoted to Ligue 2 at the end of the season because of financial mismanagement and would be banned from signing players in January 2025.

== Players ==
=== Squad information ===
Players and squad numbers last updated on 17 May 2025. Appearances include Ligue 1, Coupe de France, Coupe de la Ligue, Trophée des Champions, UEFA Champions League and UEFA Europa League matches.
Note: Flags indicate national team as has been defined under FIFA eligibility rules. Players may hold more than one non-FIFA nationality.

No.	Player	Nat.	Position(s)	Date of birth (age)	Signed in	Contract ends	Transfer fee	Signed from	Apps.	Goals	Notes
Goalkeepers
1	Lucas Perri	(Brazil)	GK	10 December 1997 (age 28)	2024	2028	€3.25M	(Brazil) Botafogo	49	0	Second nationality: Italy
40	Rémy Descamps	(France)	GK	25 June 1996 (age 30)	2024	2027	Free	(France) Nantes	3	0	
50	Lassine Diarra	(Mali)	GK	11 November 2002 (age 24)	2023	2027	Free	(France) Châteauroux	0	0	
Defenders
3	Nicolás Tagliafico	(Argentina)	LB	21 August 1992 (age 34)	2022	2025	€4.2M	(Netherlands) Ajax	102	9	Second nationality: Italy
16	Abner Vinícius	(Brazil)	LB	27 May 2000 (age 26)	2024	2029	€8M	(Spain) Real Betis	27	2	
19	Moussa Niakhaté	(Senegal)	CB	8 March 1996 (age 30)	2024	2028	€31.9M	(England) Nottingham Forest	42	0	Second nationality: France
20	Saël Kumbedi	(France)	RB	26 March 2005 (age 21)	2022	2027	€1M	(France) Le Havre	61	0	
22	Clinton Mata	(Angola)	RB / CB	7 November 1992 (age 34)	2023	2026	€5M	(Belgium) Club Brugge	73	0	Second nationality: Belgium
27	Warmed Omari	(Comoros)	CB	23 April 2000 (age 26)	2024	2025	Loan	(France) Rennes	4	0	Second nationality: France
55	Duje Ćaleta-Car	(Croatia)	CB	17 September 1996 (age 30)	2023	2027	€5.13M	(England) Southampton	56	1	
Midfielders
4	Paul Akouokou	(Ivory Coast)	DM	20 December 1997 (age 28)	2023	2027	€3M	(Spain) Real Betis	14	0	
7	Jordan Veretout	(France)	CM	1 March 1993 (age 33)	2024	2026	€4M	(France) Marseille	38	2	
8	Corentin Tolisso	(France)	CM	3 August 1994 (age 32)	2022	2027	Free	(Germany) Bayern Munich	270	42	Second nationality: Togo; Originally from youth system
15	Tanner Tessmann	(United States)	DM / CM	24 September 2001 (age 25)	2024	2029	€6M	(Italy) Venezia	35	1	
23	Thiago Almada	(Argentina)	AM / LW	26 April 2001 (age 25)	2025	2025	Loan	(Brazil) Botafogo	20	2	
31	Nemanja Matić	(Serbia)	DM	1 August 1988 (age 38)	2024	2026	€2.6M	(France) Rennes	58	1	
98	Ainsley Maitland-Niles	(England)	CM / RB	29 August 1997 (age 29)	2023	2027	Free	(England) Arsenal	73	3	Second nationality: Barbados
Forwards
10	Alexandre Lacazette	(France)	CF	28 May 1991 (age 35)	2022	2025	Free	(England) Arsenal	391	201	Originally from youth system
11	Malick Fofana	(Belgium)	LW / RW	31 March 2005 (age 21)	2024	2028	€17M	(Belgium) Gent	62	15	
18	Rayan Cherki	(France)	RW / AM	17 August 2003 (age 23)	2019	2026	N/A	(France) Youth Sector	185	28	
37	Ernest Nuamah	(Ghana)	RW / LW	1 November 2003 (age 23)	2023	2028	€28.5M	(Belgium) Molenbeek	66	9	
69	Georges Mikautadze	(Georgia (country))	CF	31 October 2000 (age 26)	2024	2028	€18.5M	(France) Metz	47	17	Second nationality: France; Originally from youth system
Left during the season
1	Anthony Lopes	(Portugal)	GK	1 October 1990 (age 36)	2012	2025	N/A	(France) Youth Sector	489	0	Second nationality: France
6	Maxence Caqueret	(France)	CM	15 February 2000 (age 26)	2018	2026	N/A	(France) Youth Sector	184	7	
7	Mama Baldé	(Guinea-Bissau)	CF / RW	6 November 1995 (age 31)	2023	2027	€8M	(France) Troyes	25	2	Second nationality: Portugal
9	Gift Orban	(Nigeria)	CF / LW	17 July 2002 (age 24)	2024	2028	€12M	(Belgium) Gent	21	5	
12	Wilfried Zaha	(Ivory Coast)	LW / RW	10 November 1992 (age 34)	2024	2025	Loan	(Turkey) Galatasaray	6	0	Second nationality: England
14	Adryelson	(Brazil)	CB	28 March 1998 (age 28)	2024	2028	€3.58M	(Brazil) Botafogo	4	0	
17	Saïd Benrahma	(Algeria)	LW / AM	10 August 1995 (age 31)	2024	2027	€20.4M	(England) West Ham United	36	6	
25	Orel Mangala	(Belgium)	DM	18 March 1998 (age 28)	2024	2028	€35.1M	(England) Nottingham Forest	13	2	
30	Justin Bengui	(France)	GK	9 July 2005 (age 21)	2021	2028	N/A	(France) Youth Sector	0	0	
34	Mahamadou Diawara	(France)	CM	17 February 2005 (age 21)	2023	2027	Free	(France) Paris Saint-Germain	16	0	

=== Players from Olympique Lyonnais Reserves and Academy ===
Note: Flags indicate national team as defined under FIFA eligibility rules; some limited exceptions apply. Players may hold more than one non-FIFA nationality.

No.	Pos.	Nation	Player
26	MF	TUN	Chaïm El Djebali
29	FW	FRA	Enzo Molebe
32	FW	ENG	Alejandro Gomes Rodríguez
33	DF	CRO	Téo Barisic
36	FW	FRA	Romain Perret
53	MF	POR	Mathys De Carvalho

No.	Pos.	Nation	Player
—	GK	FRA	Matéo Pereira
—	GK	CIV	Yvann Konan
—	DF	FRA	Jérémy Mounsesse
—	MF	SEN	Pierre Dorival
—	MF	SUI	Joss Marques
—	FW	THA	Erawan Garnier

=== Out on loan ===
Note: Flags indicate national team as defined under FIFA eligibility rules; some limited exceptions apply. Players may hold more than one non-FIFA nationality.

No.	Pos.	Nation	Player
—	GK	FRA	Mathieu Patouillet (at (France) Sochaux until 30 June 2025)
—	GK	FRA	Justin Bengui (at (Serbia) Jedinstvo Ub until 30 June 2025)
—	DF	BRA	Adryelson (at (Belgium) Anderlecht until 30 June 2025)
—	DF	MAR	Achraf Laâziri (at (Belgium) RWDM until 30 June 2025)
—	MF	FRA	Mahamadou Diawara (at (France) Le Havre until 30 June 2025)

No.	Pos.	Nation	Player
—	MF	FRA	Islam Halifa (at (Belgium) RWDM until 30 June 2025)
—	MF	FRA	Johann Lepenant (at (France) Nantes until 30 June 2025)
—	MF	BEL	Orel Mangala (at (England) Everton until 30 June 2025)
—	FW	ALG	Saïd Benrahma (at (Saudi Arabia) Neom until 30 June 2025)
—	FW	SWE	Amin Sarr (at (Italy) Hellas Verona until 30 June 2025)

== Transfers ==
=== In ===
No.	Pos.	Player	Transferred from	Fee	Date	Source
Summer
15	DF	(Morocco) Achraf Laâziri	(France) Dunkerque	Loan return	30 June 2024	
16	GK	(France) Mathieu Patouillet	(France) Sochaux	Loan return	30 June 2024	
27	FW	(Sweden) Amin Sarr	(Germany) VfL Wolfsburg	Loan return	30 June 2024	
28	MF	(France) Florent Da Silva	(Belgium) Molenbeek	Loan return	30 June 2024	
29	DF	(France) Mamadou Sarr	(Belgium) Molenbeek	Loan return	30 June 2024	
31	DF	(France) Irvyn Lomani	(France) Laval	Loan return	30 June 2024	
80	MF	(France) Skelly Alvero	(Germany) Werder Bremen	Loan return	30 June 2024	
7	FW	(Guinea-Bissau) Mama Baldé	(France) Troyes	€6M	1 July 2024	
17	FW	(Algeria) Saïd Benrahma	(England) West Ham United	€14.4M	1 July 2024	
55	DF	(Croatia) Duje Ćaleta-Car	(England) Southampton	€3.59M	1 July 2024	
25	MF	(Belgium) Orel Mangala	(England) Nottingham Forest	€23.4M	2 July 2024	
19	DF	(Senegal) Moussa Niakhaté	(England) Nottingham Forest	€31.9M	4 July 2024	
16	DF	(Brazil) Abner Vinícius	(Spain) Real Betis	€8M	5 July 2024	
37	FW	(Ghana) Ernest Nuamah	(Belgium) Molenbeek	€28.5M	7 July 2024	
69	FW	(Georgia (country)) Georges Mikautadze	(France) Metz	€18.5M	17 July 2024	
32	FW	(England) Alejandro Gomes Rodríguez	(England) Southampton	Free	20 July 2024	
40	GK	(France) Rémy Descamps	(France) Nantes	Free	23 August 2024	
15	MF	(United States) Tanner Tessmann	(Italy) Venezia	€6M	27 August 2024	
27	DF	(Comoros) Warmed Omari	(France) Rennes	Loan (€0.5M)	30 August 2024	
12	FW	(Ivory Coast) Wilfried Zaha	(Turkey) Galatasaray	Loan (€3M)	30 August 2024	
7	MF	(France) Jordan Veretout	(France) Marseille	€4M	4 September 2024	
	MF	(Switzerland) Joss Marques	(France) Bordeaux	Free	19 September 2024	
Winter
14	DF	(Brazil) Adryelson	(Brazil) Botafogo	Loan return	1 January 2025	
23	MF	(Argentina) Thiago Almada	(Brazil) Botafogo	Loan	15 January 2025	

=== Out ===
No.	Pos.	Player	Transferred to	Fee	Date	Source
Summer
11	FW	(Zimbabwe) Tino Kadewere	(France) Nantes	Free	1 July 2024	
21	DF	(Brazil) Henrique	(Spain) Real Valladolid	Free	1 July 2024	
16	GK	(France) Mathieu Patouillet	(France) Sochaux	Loan	1 July 2024	
	MF	(France) Islam Halifa	(Belgium) Molenbeek	Loan	1 July 2024	
80	MF	(France) Skelly Alvero	(Germany) Werder Bremen	€4.75M	1 July 2024	
15	DF	(Morocco) Achraf Laâziri	(Belgium) Molenbeek	Loan	8 July 2024	
32	FW	(Algeria) Djibrail Dib	(France) Rouen	Free	29 July 2024	
12	DF	(Republic of Ireland) Jake O'Brien	(England) Everton	€19.5M	30 July 2024	
	MF	(Senegal) Moussa Kanté	(Armenia) Ararat Yerevan	Free	9 August 2024	
24	MF	(France) Johann Lepenant	(France) Nantes	Loan	10 August 2024	
84	MF	(France) Mohamed El Arouch	(Brazil) Botafogo	Free	21 August 2024	
29	DF	(France) Mamadou Sarr	(France) Strasbourg	€10M	22 August 2024	
27	FW	(Sweden) Amin Sarr	(Italy) Hellas Verona	Loan	27 August 2024	
25	MF	(Belgium) Orel Mangala	(England) Everton	Loan	30 August 2024	
2	DF	(Ivory Coast) Sinaly Diomandé	(France) Auxerre	Free	30 August 2024	
7	FW	(Guinea-Bissau) Mama Baldé	(France) Brest	€4.5M	30 August 2024	
14	DF	(Brazil) Adryelson	(Brazil) Botafogo	Loan	2 September 2024	
	MF	(Senegal) Pape Fuhrer	(Serbia) Partizan	Free	13 September 2024	
5	DF	(Croatia) Dejan Lovren	(Greece) PAOK	Free	16 September 2024	
28	MF	(France) Florent Da Silva	(France) Orléans	Free	29 November 2024	
Winter
1	GK	(Portugal) Anthony Lopes	(France) Nantes	Free	1 January 2025	
47	FW	(Brazil) Jeffinho	(Brazil) Botafogo	€5.3M	1 January 2025	
9	FW	(Nigeria) Gift Orban	(Germany) TSG Hoffenheim	€9M	2 January 2025	
6	MF	(France) Maxence Caqueret	(Italy) Como	€15M	12 January 2025	
14	DF	(Brazil) Adryelson	(Belgium) Anderlecht	Loan	15 January 2025	
34	MF	(France) Mahamadou Diawara	(France) Le Havre	Loan	18 January 2025	
30	GK	(France) Justin Bengui	(Serbia) Jedinstvo Ub	Loan	20 January 2025	
12	FW	(Ivory Coast) Wilfried Zaha	(Turkey) Galatasaray	End of loan	22 January 2025	
17	FW	(Algeria) Saïd Benrahma	(Saudi Arabia) Neom	Loan	31 January 2025	
91	FW	(France) Sekou Lega	(Saudi Arabia) Al-Riyadh	Free	31 January 2025	

== Pre-season and friendlies ==
Win Draw Loss Fixtures

Lyon started the pre-season campaign on 5 July 2024 in the club's training ground in Décines-Charpieu, before traveling to Austria from 15 to 25 July for a training camp in Innsbruck.

13 July 2024 Friendly	Lyon	7–0	Chassieu Décines	Décines-Charpieu, France
19:00 CEST (UTC+2)	Lepenant 11', 44'; Orban 17' (pen.); Perret 56'; Baldé 68'; Molébé 82', 89'	Report		Stadium: Stade Gérard Houllier

19 July 2024 Friendly	WSG Tirol	2–3	Lyon	Wattens, Austria
17:30 CEST (UTC+2)	Blume 49'; Hinterseer 70'	Report	Tolisso 29', 37'; Caqueret 72'	Stadium: Gernot-Langes-Stadion

24 July 2024 Friendly	FC St. Pauli	1–0	Lyon	Schwaz, Austria
18:00 CEST (UTC+2)	Nemeth (yellow card) 5'; Schmitz 87'	Report		Stadium: Silberstadt Arena; Attendance: 2,500

31 July 2024 Friendly	Lyon	0–0	Torino	Bourgoin-Jallieu, France
20:00 CEST (UTC+2)		Report	Vojvoda (yellow card) 52'	Stadium: Stade Pierre Rajon

3 August 2024 Friendly	Union Berlin	0–4	Lyon	Berlin, Germany
17:00 CEST (UTC+2)		Report	Maitland-Niles 49'; Benrahma 65'; Orban 75', 86'	Stadium: Stadion An der Alten Försterei; Attendance: 12,317

11 August 2024 Emirates Cup	Arsenal	2–0	Lyon	London, England
12:00 BST (UTC+1)	Saliba 9'; Gabriel 27'	Report		Stadium: Emirates Stadium; Attendance: 60,000; Referee: Craig Pawson (England)

== Competitions ==
=== Overall record ===
Competition	First match	Last match	Starting round	Final position	Record							
Competition	First match	Last match	Starting round	Final position	Pld	W	D	L	GF	GA	GD	Win %
Ligue 1	18 August 2024	17 May 2025	Matchday 1	6th	34	17	6	11	65	46	+19	50.00
Coupe de France	21 December 2024	15 January 2025	Round of 64	Round of 32	2	1	1	0	4	3	+1	50.00
UEFA Europa League	26 September 2024	17 April 2025	League phase	Quarter-finals	12	6	4	2	29	16	+13	50.00
Total					48	24	11	13	98	65	+33	50.00

Source: Soccerway

=== Ligue 1 ===
==== League table ====
Pos	Team	Pld	W	D	L	GF	GA	GD	Pts	Qualification or relegation
4	Nice	34	17	9	8	66	41	+25	60	Qualification for the Champions League third qualifying round
5	Lille	34	17	9	8	52	36	+16	60	Qualification for the Europa League league phase (Note: Since the 2024–25 Coupe de France winners, Paris Saint-Germain, qualified for the Champions League via league position, the Europa League berth awarded to the cup winners was passed to the sixth-placed team and the Conference League berth was passed to the seventh-placed team.)
6	Lyon	34	17	6	11	65	46	+19	57	Qualification for the Europa League league phase
7	Strasbourg	34	16	9	9	56	44	+12	57	Qualification for the Conference League play-off round
8	Lens	34	15	7	12	42	39	+3	52	

Source: Ligue 1
Rules for classification: 1) Points; 2) Goal difference; 3) Head-to-head points; 4) Head-to-head goal difference; 5) Head-to-head goals scored; 6) Head-to-head away goals scored; 7) Goals scored; 8) Away goals scored; 9) Fair-play points (Note: Head-to-head record is used only after all the matches between the teams in question have been played).

==== Results summary ====
Overall								Home						Away					
Pld	W	D	L	GF	GA	GD	Pts	W	D	L	GF	GA	GD	W	D	L	GF	GA	GD
34	17	6	11	65	46	+19	57	11	2	4	37	21	+16	6	4	7	28	25	+3

Source: Ligue 1

==== Results by round ====
Round	1	2	3	4	5	6	7	8	9	10	11	12	13	14	15	16	17	18	19	20	21	22	23	24	25	26	27	28	29	30	31	32	33	34
Ground	A	H	H	A	H	A	H	A	H	A	H	A	H	A	A	H	A	H	A	A	H	A	H	H	A	H	A	H	A	A	H	H	A	H
Result	L	L	W	D	L	W	W	W	D	D	W	D	W	W	L	W	L	D	D	L	W	W	L	W	W	W	L	W	W	L	W	L	L	W
Position	17	17	14	13	14	11	8	7	7	6	5	6	5	5	5	5	6	6	6	7	6	6	6	6	6	5	7	5	4	6	5	7	7	6

Source: Ligue 1
A = Away; H = Home; W = Win; D = Draw; L = Loss

==== Matches ====
The league fixtures were announced on 21 June 2024.

18 August 2024 1	Rennes	3–0	Lyon	Rennes
20:45 CEST (UTC+2)	Bourigeaud 19'; Gouiri 21'; Østigård (yellow card) 42'; Assignon (yellow card) 64'; Meister 90+1'	Report	Ćaleta-Car (yellow card) 44'; Mikautadze (penalty missed) 71'	Stadium: Roazhon Park; Attendance: 26,026; Referee: Benoît Millot

24 August 2024 2	Lyon	0–2	Monaco	Décines-Charpieu
17:00 CEST (UTC+2)	Tolisso (yellow card) 90'; Mata (yellow card) 90+6'	Report	Salisu (yellow card) 44'; Ben Seghir 65'; Camara 80', (yellow card) 90+4' (yellow-red card) 90+7'	Stadium: Parc Olympique Lyonnais; Attendance: 54,392; Referee: Stéphanie Frappart

30 August 2024 3	Lyon	4–3	Strasbourg	Décines-Charpieu
20:45 CEST (UTC+2)	Abner (yellow card) 33'; Tolisso 45+2'; Maitland-Niles 61'; Orban 63', 72', (yellow card) 90+8'; Adryelson (yellow card) 90+7'	Report	Nanasi 3'; Doué (yellow card) 17'; Andrey Santos 48'; Emegha 58'; Senaya (yellow card) 75'	Stadium: Parc Olympique Lyonnais; Attendance: 43,805; Referee: Thomas Léonard

15 September 2024 4	Lens	0–0	Lyon	Lens
20:45 CEST (UTC+2)		Report		Stadium: Stade Bollaert-Delelis; Attendance: 38,116; Referee: Bastien Dechepy

22 September 2024 5	Lyon	2–3	Marseille	Décines-Charpieu
20:45 CEST (UTC+2)	Mata (yellow card) 45+1'; Lacazette (penalty missed) 45+7', (yellow card) 59'; Ćaleta-Car 53', (yellow card) 90+3'; Cherki 90+3', (yellow card) 90+4'	Report	Balerdi (yellow card) 1' (yellow-red card) 5'; Lirola 69'; Garcia 82'; Maupay (yellow card) 90+3'; Rowe 90+5'	Stadium: Parc Olympique Lyonnais; Attendance: 53,228; Referee: Benoît Bastien

29 September 2024 6	Toulouse	1–2	Lyon	Toulouse
15:00 CEST (UTC+2)	Gboho 14'; Dønnum (yellow card) 58'; Cásseres (yellow card) 87'	Report	Veretout (yellow card) 10'; Nicolaisen 28' (o.g.); Ćaleta-Car (yellow card) 48'; Fofana 90+5'	Stadium: Stade de Toulouse; Attendance: 30,026; Referee: Gaël Angoula

6 October 2024 7	Lyon	2–0	Nantes	Décines-Charpieu
15:00 CEST (UTC+2)	Tagliafico 22', (yellow card) 66'; Pallois 54' (o.g.)	Report	Cozza (yellow card) 61'; Douglas Augusto (yellow card) 71'	Stadium: Parc Olympique Lyonnais; Attendance: 51,888; Referee: Marc Bollengier

20 October 2024 8	Le Havre	0–4	Lyon	Le Havre
15:00 CEST (UTC+2)	Négo (yellow card) 6'; Touré (yellow card) 18'; Casimir (yellow card) 36'	Report	Abner 32'; Cherki (yellow card) 35'; Caqueret (yellow card) 36'; Tolisso (yellow card) 47'; Fofana 57'; Lacazette 71'; Nuamah (yellow card) 78'; Benrahma 87'	Stadium: Stade Océane; Attendance: 22,490; Referee: Abdelatif Kherradji

27 October 2024 9	Lyon	2–2	Auxerre	Décines-Charpieu
15:00 CET (UTC+1)	Mikautadze 45+5' (pen.), 62'	Report	Diomandé (yellow card) 44', (goal) 47'; Jubal (yellow card) 45+7'; Traorè 72'; Léon (yellow card) 80'; Raveloson (yellow card) 90+3'	Stadium: Parc Olympique Lyonnais; Attendance: 54,868; Referee: Jérémy Stinat

1 November 2024 10	Lille	1–1	Lyon	Villeneuve-d'Ascq
21:00 CET (UTC+1)	David 17'; Zhegrova (yellow card) 43'; Mukau (yellow card) 57'; André (yellow card) 90+2'	Report	Ćaleta-Car (yellow card) 30'; Fofana 90+1'	Stadium: Stade Pierre-Mauroy; Attendance: 45,084; Referee: Jérôme Brisard

10 November 2024 11	Lyon	1–0	Saint-Étienne	Décines-Charpieu
20:45 CET (UTC+1)	Lacazette 29'; Ćaleta-Car (yellow card) 40'; Fofana (yellow card) 86'; Perri (yellow card) 90+5'	Report	Stassin (yellow card) 34'; Boakye (yellow card) 35'	Stadium: Parc Olympique Lyonnais; Attendance: 58,082; Referee: Willy Delajod

23 November 2024 12	Reims	1–1	Lyon	Reims
21:00 CET (UTC+1)	Diakité 55'; Koné (yellow card) 64'; Kipré (yellow card) 80'	Report	Cherki 38'	Stadium: Stade Auguste-Delaune; Attendance: 18,274; Referee: Stéphanie Frappart

1 December 2024 13	Lyon	4–1	Nice	Décines-Charpieu
17:00 CET (UTC+1)	Lacazette 4', 41', 69' (pen.); Veretout 43'; Tagliafico (yellow card) 90+1'	Report	Diop 22'; Boudaoui (yellow card) 54'; Louchet (yellow card) 90+6'	Stadium: Parc Olympique Lyonnais; Attendance: 50,977; Referee: Bastien Dechepy

7 December 2024 14	Angers	0–3	Lyon	Angers
21:00 CET (UTC+1)	Dieng (yellow card) 13'	Report	Lacazette (yellow card) 13'; Tagliafico 26'; Cherki 55'; Mikautadze 88'; Ćaleta-Car (yellow card) 90+4'	Stadium: Stade Raymond Kopa; Attendance: 16,301; Referee: Marc Bollengier

15 December 2024 15	Paris Saint-Germain	3–1	Lyon	Paris
20:45 CET (UTC+1)	Dembélé 8'; Vitinha 14' (pen.); Lee (yellow card) 15'; Donnarumma (yellow card) 41'; Ramos 88'	Report	Mikautadze 40', (yellow card) 41'; Veretout (yellow card) 45+2'; Tagliafico (yellow card) 90+2'	Stadium: Parc des Princes; Attendance: 47,926; Referee: Benoît Bastien

4 January 2025 16	Lyon	1–0	Montpellier	Décines-Charpieu
21:00 CET (UTC+1)	Veretout (yellow card) 66'; Fayad 90+1' (o.g.)	Report	Sagnan (yellow card) 50'; Maksimović (yellow card) 64'	Stadium: Parc Olympique Lyonnais; Attendance: 48,162; Referee: Jérémy Stinat

11 January 2025 17	Brest	2–1	Lyon	Brest
17:00 CET (UTC+1)	Camara 8'; Ajorque 25'; Fernandes (yellow card) 55'	Report	Veretout 45+2'; Tessmann (yellow card) 57'; Ćaleta-Car (yellow card) 90+2'	Stadium: Stade Francis-Le Blé; Attendance: 14,735; Referee: Eric Wattellier

18 January 2025 18	Lyon	0–0	Toulouse	Décines-Charpieu
21:00 CET (UTC+1)	Kumbedi (yellow card) 56'	Report		Stadium: Parc Olympique Lyonnais; Attendance: 42,592; Referee: Benoît Millot

26 January 2025 19	Nantes	1–1	Lyon	Nantes
17:15 CET (UTC+1)	Pallois (yellow card) 41'; Mollet (yellow card) 57'; Mohamed 90'; Coco (yellow card) 90+4'	Report	Nuamah 10'; Mata (yellow card) 69'	Stadium: Stade de la Beaujoire; Attendance: 32,690; Referee: Benoît Bastien

2 February 2025 20	Marseille	3–2	Lyon	Marseille
20:45 CET (UTC+1)	Murillo (yellow card) 42'; Greenwood 61'; Rabiot 64'; Balerdi (yellow card) 68'; Luis Henrique 85'; Højbjerg (yellow card) 90+2'; Cornelius (yellow card) 90+4'	Report	Tolisso 53'; Lacazette 72' (pen.); Tagliafico (yellow card) 82'	Stadium: Stade Vélodrome; Attendance: 66,096; Referee: Jérôme Brisard

9 February 2025 21	Lyon	4–0	Reims	Décines-Charpieu
15:00 CET (UTC+1)	Mata (yellow card) 31'; Tagliafico 36', (yellow card) 58'; Tolisso 68'; Cherki 79'; Mikautadze 90+3'	Report	Diakité (yellow card) 11'; Sangui (yellow card) 67'; Zabi (red card) 87'	Stadium: Parc Olympique Lyonnais; Attendance: 43,489; Referee: François Letexier

16 February 2025 22	Montpellier	1–4	Lyon	Montpellier
15:00 CET (UTC+1)	Coulibaly (yellow card) 29', (goal) 38'; Delort (yellow card) 34'; Sainte-Luce (yellow card) 86'	Report	Mikautadze 3'; Nuamah 50'; Tolisso 53'; Tagliafico (yellow card) 64'; Lacazette 73'	Stadium: Stade de la Mosson; Attendance: 16,573; Referee: Marc Bollengier

23 February 2025 23	Lyon	2–3	Paris Saint-Germain	Décines-Charpieu
20:45 CET (UTC+1)	Cherki 83'; Almada (yellow card) 85'; Tolisso 90+2'	Report	Hakimi (yellow card) 36', (goal) 53', 85'; Dembélé 59'	Stadium: Parc Olympique Lyonnais; Attendance: 57,777; Referee: Eric Wattellier

2 March 2025 24	Lyon	2–1	Brest	Décines-Charpieu
15:00 CET (UTC+1)	Lacazette 24', 82', (yellow card) 45+3'; Tessmann (yellow card) 34'	Report	Lala 15' (pen.), (yellow card) 59'	Stadium: Parc Olympique Lyonnais; Attendance: 47,804; Referee: Benoît Millot

9 March 2025 25	Nice	0–2	Lyon	Nice
20:45 CET (UTC+1)	Ndayishimiye (yellow card) 72'	Report	Kumbedi (yellow card) 4'; Cherki 78'; Nuamah 83'; Tolisso (yellow card) 90+5'	Stadium: Allianz Riviera; Attendance: 23,840; Referee: Benoît Bastien

16 March 2025 26	Lyon	4–2	Le Havre	Décines-Charpieu
15:00 CET (UTC+1)	Lacazette 22' (pen.); Matic (yellow card) 37'; Nuamah (yellow card) 55'; Fofana 78'; Mikautadze 82'; Almada 90+6'	Report	Touré 31' (pen.), (yellow card) 84'; Casimir 45+1'; Gorgelin (yellow card) 63'; Négo (yellow card) 66'	Stadium: Parc Olympique Lyonnais; Attendance: 46,492; Referee: Bastien Dechepy

28 March 2025 27	Strasbourg	4–2	Lyon	Strasbourg
20:45 CET (UTC+1)	Andrey Santos 55', (yellow card) 66'; Bakwa 60'; Emegha 73', (yellow card) 82'; Amo-Ameyaw 89'	Report	Tolisso 62'; Cherki (yellow card) 82'; Tessmann (yellow card) 83'; Mikautadze 90+6' (pen.)	Stadium: Stade de la Meinau; Attendance: 19,496; Referee: Romain Lissorgue

5 April 2025 28	Lyon	2–1	Lille	Décines-Charpieu
21:05 CEST (UTC+2)	Lacazette (yellow card) 22', (goal) 38' (pen.); Tolisso (yellow card) 25'; Cherki 70'; Maitland-Niles (yellow card) 77'	Report	Diakité 1', (yellow card) 72'; André (yellow card) 56'	Stadium: Parc Olympique Lyonnais; Attendance: 53,771; Referee: Eric Wattellier

13 April 2025 29	Auxerre	1–3	Lyon	Auxerre
20:45 CEST (UTC+2)	Diomandé (yellow card) 2'; Léon (yellow card) 52'; Sinayoko 77'; Matondo (yellow card) 88'	Report	Mikautadze 54' (pen.); Almada (yellow card) 58'; Cherki 62'; Lacazette 84'	Stadium: Stade de l'Abbé-Deschamps; Attendance: 17,511; Referee: Stéphanie Frappart

20 April 2025 30	Saint-Étienne	2–1	Lyon	Saint-Étienne
20:45 CEST (UTC+2)	Stassin 10', (yellow card) 24', (goal) 67'; Pétrot (yellow card) 78'; Appiah (yellow card) 79'	Report	Lacazette (yellow card) 27'; Akouokou (yellow card) 32'; Mikautadze (yellow card) 52'; Tessmann 76'; Mata (yellow card) 90+2'	Stadium: Stade Geoffroy-Guichard; Attendance: 40,372; Referee: François Letexier

26 April 2025 31	Lyon	4–1	Rennes	Décines-Charpieu
21:05 CEST (UTC+2)	Fofana 8'; Tolisso 25'; Lacazette 39'; Mikautadze 77'	Report	Meïté 77'	Stadium: Parc Olympique Lyonnais; Attendance: 51,034; Referee: Marc Bollengier

4 May 2025 32	Lyon	1–2	Lens	Décines-Charpieu
17:15 CEST (UTC+2)	Niakhaté (yellow card) 13'; Fofana (yellow card) 45+2'; Mikautadze 79'	Report	Koyalipou 21'; Mendy (yellow card) 54'; Machado (yellow card) 64'; Zaroury 85'; Medina (yellow card) 89'	Stadium: Parc Olympique Lyonnais; Attendance: 52,020; Referee: Jérémy Stinat

10 May 2025 33	Monaco	2–0	Lyon	Monaco
21:00 CEST (UTC+2)	Camara (yellow card) 59'; Minamino 62'; Zakaria 68'; Diatta (yellow card) 88'	Report	Mata (yellow card) 9'; Almada (yellow card) 45+2'; Tagliafico (yellow card) 90'; Niakhaté (yellow card) 90+2'	Stadium: Stade Louis II; Attendance: 13,578; Referee: Benoît Bastien

17 May 2025 34	Lyon	2–0	Angers	Décines-Charpieu
21:00 CEST (UTC+2)	Ćaleta-Car (yellow card) 25'; Lacazette 55' (pen.), 72'	Report	Lefort (yellow card) 12'; Raolisoa (yellow card) 58'; Caumont (yellow card) 90+1'	Stadium: Parc Olympique Lyonnais; Attendance: 56,517; Referee: Stéphanie Frappart

=== Coupe de France ===
21 December 2024 Round of 64	Feignies-Aulnoye	1–2	Lyon	Valenciennes
18:00 CET (UTC+1)	Ouattara (yellow card) 50'; Koubemba 90+4'	Report	Caqueret (yellow card) 39'; Benrahma 44'; Descamps (yellow card) 85'; Mikautadze 88'	Stadium: Stade du Hainaut; Attendance: 10,219; Referee: Gaël Angoula

15 January 2025 Round of 32	Bourgoin-Jallieu	2–2 (4–2 p)	Lyon	Bourgoin-Jallieu
18:00 CET (UTC+1)	Moujetzky 20', 69'; Atik (yellow card) 79'	Report	Matić 45'; Maitland-Niles (yellow card) 49'; Mikautadze 64'; Cherki (yellow card) 90+5'	Stadium: Stade Pierre Rajon; Attendance: 6,359; Referee: Mikael Lesage
	Penalties
	Bozkurt (penalty scored); Norde (penalty scored); Mendy (penalty scored); Moujetzky (penalty missed); Atik (penalty scored)		(penalty missed) Lacazette; (penalty missed) Tolisso; (penalty scored) Niakhaté; (penalty scored) Nuamah

=== UEFA Europa League ===
==== League phase ====
The draw for the league phase was held on 30 August 2024.

Pos	Team	Pld	W	D	L	GF	GA	GD	Pts	Qualification
4	(The Football Association) Tottenham Hotspur	8	5	2	1	17	9	+8	17	Advance to round of 16 (seeded)
5	(German Football Association) Eintracht Frankfurt	8	5	1	2	14	10	+4	16	Advance to round of 16 (seeded)
6	(French Football Federation) Lyon	8	4	3	1	16	8	+8	15	Advance to round of 16 (seeded)
7	(Hellenic Football Federation) Olympiacos	8	4	3	1	9	3	+6	15	Advance to round of 16 (seeded)
8	(Scottish Football Association) Rangers	8	4	2	2	16	10	+6	14	Advance to round of 16 (seeded)

Source: UEFA
Rules for classification: League phase tiebreakers

Round	1	2	3	4	5	6	7	8
Ground	H	A	H	A	A	H	A	H
Result	W	W	L	D	W	W	D	D
Position	8	2	10	9	7	4	5	6

Source: UEFA
A = Away; H = Home; W = Win; D = Draw; L = Loss

26 September 2024 1	Lyon (France)	2–0	(Greece) Olympiacos	Décines-Charpieu, France
21:00 CEST (UTC+2)	Cherki 65'; Benrahma 71'; Tagliafico (yellow card) 77'	Report	García (yellow card) 33'; Hezze (yellow card) 57'; Rodinei (yellow card) 90+3'	Stadium: Parc Olympique Lyonnais; Attendance: 24,412; Referee: Lawrence Visser (Belgium)

3 October 2024 2	Rangers (Scotland)	1–4	(France) Lyon	Glasgow, Scotland
20:00 BST (UTC+1)	Lawrence 14'; Souttar (yellow card) 24'; Barron (yellow card) 53'	Report	Fofana 10', 55'; Lacazette 19', 45+1'; Cherki (yellow card) 65'; Veretout (yellow card) 72'; Benrahma (yellow card) 83'	Stadium: Ibrox Stadium; Attendance: 41,981; Referee: Sven Jablonski (Germany)

24 October 2024 3	Lyon (France)	0–1	(Turkey) Beşiktaş	Décines-Charpieu, France
21:00 CEST (UTC+2)	Tolisso (yellow card) 41'; Tessmann (yellow card) 61'	Report	Topçu (yellow card) 29'; Masuaku (yellow card) 45+6'; João Mário (yellow card) 70'; Fernandes 71'; Destanoğlu (yellow card) 83'; Silva (yellow card) 83'; Kılıçsoy (yellow card) 84'	Stadium: Parc Olympique Lyonnais; Attendance: 27,350; Referee: Harm Osmers (Germany)

7 November 2024 4	TSG Hoffenheim (Germany)	2–2	(France) Lyon	Sinsheim, Germany
21:00 CET (UTC+1)	Stach (yellow card) 6'; Gendrey 47'; Chaves (yellow card) 79'; Tohumcu 90+6'	Report	Mata (yellow card) 10'; Abner 66'; Lacazette 90+3'	Stadium: Rhein-Neckar-Arena; Attendance: 18,227; Referee: Marian Barbu (Romania)

28 November 2024 5	Qarabağ (Azerbaijan)	1–4	(France) Lyon	Baku, Azerbaijan
21:45 AZT (UTC+4)	Perri 88' (o.g.)	Report	Mikautadze 15', 80'; Maitland-Niles (yellow card) 57'; Tolisso 63'; Fofana 68'; Tagliafico (yellow card) 90+3'	Stadium: Tofiq Bahramov Republican Stadium; Attendance: 22,563; Referee: Nenad Minaković (Serbia)

12 December 2024 6	Lyon (France)	3–2	(Germany) Eintracht Frankfurt	Décines-Charpieu, France
21:00 CET (UTC+1)	Cherki 27'; Fofana 50', (yellow card) 90+7'; Nuamah 54'; Lacazette (yellow card) 61'; Tagliafico (yellow card) 69'; Maitland-Niles (yellow card) 90'; Niakhaté (yellow card) 90+7'	Report	Nkounkou (yellow card) 13'; Knauff 18'; Koch (yellow card) 57'; Ekitike (yellow card) 74'; Marmoush (yellow card) 80', (goal) 85'; Kristensen (yellow card) 90'; Collins (yellow card) 90+3'; Skhiri (yellow card) 90+6'	Stadium: Parc Olympique Lyonnais; Attendance: 41,091; Referee: Andris Treimanis (Latvia)

23 January 2025 7	Fenerbahçe (Turkey)	0–0	(France) Lyon	Istanbul, Turkey
20:45 TRT (UTC+3)	Kahveci (yellow card) 32'; Akçiçek (yellow card) 64'; Amrabat (yellow card) 72'; Osayi-Samuel (yellow card) 87'	Report	Kumbedi (yellow card) 31'; Niakhaté (yellow card) 45+6'; Lacazette (yellow card) 50'; Ćaleta-Car (yellow card) 74'; Tolisso (yellow card) 77'	Stadium: Şükrü Saracoğlu Stadium; Attendance: 36,722; Referee: Simone Sozza (Italy)

30 January 2025 8	Lyon (France)	1–1	(Bulgaria) Ludogorets Razgrad	Décines-Charpieu, France
21:00 CET (UTC+1)	Nuamah (yellow card) 37'; Tolisso 54'	Report	Erick Marcus (yellow card) 72'; Almeida 77'; Piotrowski (yellow card) 83'	Stadium: Parc Olympique Lyonnais; Attendance: 35,448; Referee: Anastasios Sidiropoulos (Greece)

==== Knockout phase ====
===== Round of 16 =====
The draw for the round of 16 was held on 21 February 2025.

6 March 2025 First leg	FCSB (Romania)	1–3	(France) Lyon	Bucharest, Romania
19:45 EET (UTC+2)	Șut (yellow card) 11'; Miculescu (yellow card) 47'; Băluță 68'	Report	Tagliafico 30'; Fofana 86', 89'	Stadium: Arena Națională; Attendance: 53,028; Referee: Tobias Stieler (Germany)

13 March 2025 Second leg	Lyon (France)	4–0 (7–1 agg.)	(Romania) FCSB	Décines-Charpieu, France
21:00 CET (UTC+1)	Mikautadze 14', 47'; Nuamah 37', 88'	Report		Stadium: Parc Olympique Lyonnais; Attendance: 37,322; Referee: Anthony Taylor (England)

===== Quarter-finals =====
The draw for the order of the quarter-final legs was held on 21 February 2025, after the draw for the round of 16.

10 April 2025 First leg	Lyon (France)	2–2	(England) Manchester United	Décines-Charpieu, France
21:00 CEST (UTC+2)	Almada 25'; Tagliafico (yellow card) 79'; Cherki 90+5'	Report	Dalot (yellow card) 31'; Yoro 45+5'; Ugarte (yellow card) 52'; Mount (yellow card) 78'; Zirkzee 88'; Mainoo (yellow card) 90+4'	Stadium: Parc Olympique Lyonnais; Attendance: 58,018; Referee: Glenn Nyberg (Sweden)

17 April 2025 Second leg	Manchester United (England)	5–4 (a.e.t.) (7–6 agg.)	(France) Lyon	Manchester, England
20:00 BST (UTC+1)	Ugarte 10'; Dalot 45+1'; Garnacho (yellow card) 50'; Maguire (yellow card) 93', (goal) 120+1'; Yoro (yellow card) 108'; Fernandes 114' (pen.); Mainoo 120'	Report	Veretout (yellow card) 18'; Tolisso (yellow card) 45+1' (yellow-red card) 89', (goal) 71'; Tagliafico (yellow card) 64', (goal) 78'; Cherki 105'; Lacazette 110' (pen.); Abner (yellow card) 120+1'	Stadium: Old Trafford; Attendance: 73,228; Referee: Sandro Schärer (Switzerland)

== Statistics ==
=== Appearances and goals ===
No.	Pos	Nat	Player	Total		Ligue 1		Coupe de France		UEFA Europa League	
No.	Pos	Nat	Player	Apps	Goals	Apps	Goals	Apps	Goals	Apps	Goals
Goalkeepers
1	GK	(Brazil) BRA	Lucas Perri	45	0	33	0	1	0	11	0
40	GK	(France) FRA	Rémy Descamps	3	0	1	0	1	0	1	0
50	GK	(Mali) MLI	Lassine Diarra	0	0	0	0	0	0	0	0
Defenders
3	DF	(Argentina) ARG	Nicolás Tagliafico	33	5	22+2	3	0	0	8+1	2
16	DF	(Brazil) BRA	Abner	27	2	12+7	1	2	0	4+2	1
19	DF	(Senegal) SEN	Moussa Niakhaté	42	0	30+1	0	2	0	8+1	0
20	DF	(France) FRA	Saël Kumbedi	19	0	12+2	0	1	0	2+2	0
22	DF	(Angola) ANG	Clinton Mata	40	0	27+2	0	1+1	0	9	0
27	DF	(Comoros) COM	Warmed Omari	4	0	0+1	0	1	0	2	0
41	DF	(Croatia) CRO	Téo Barisic	1	0	0+1	0	0	0	0	0
55	DF	(Croatia) CRO	Duje Ćaleta-Car	28	1	17+2	1	0	0	6+3	0
Midfielders
4	MF	(Ivory Coast) CIV	Paul Akouokou	5	0	0+2	0	0	0	2+1	0
7	MF	(France) FRA	Jordan Veretout	38	2	19+8	2	0+2	0	6+3	0
8	MF	(France) FRA	Corentin Tolisso	45	10	26+5	7	2	0	10+2	3
15	MF	(United States) USA	Tanner Tessmann	35	1	13+12	1	1	0	6+3	0
23	MF	(Argentina) ARG	Thiago Almada	20	2	9+7	1	0	0	2+2	1
31	MF	(Serbia) SRB	Nemanja Matić	38	1	24+4	0	1+1	1	5+3	0
53	MF	(France) FRA	Mathys De Carvalho	0	0	0	0	0	0	0	0
98	MF	(England) ENG	Ainsley Maitland-Niles	44	1	20+12	1	1	0	10+1	0
Forwards
10	FW	(France) FRA	Alexandre Lacazette	42	19	24+6	15	1+1	0	4+6	4
11	FW	(Belgium) BEL	Malick Fofana	41	11	16+13	5	2	0	5+5	6
18	FW	(France) FRA	Rayan Cherki	44	12	22+8	8	1+1	0	11+1	4
29	FW	(France) FRA	Enzo Molebe	2	0	0	0	0+1	0	0+1	0
32	FW	(England) ENG	Alejandro Gomes Rodríguez	1	0	0+1	0	0	0	0	0
37	FW	(Ghana) GHA	Ernest Nuamah	33	6	13+10	3	0+1	0	7+2	3
69	FW	(Georgia (country)) GEO	Georges Mikautadze	47	17	13+21	11	1+1	2	8+3	4
Players transferred/loaned out during the season
1	GK	(Portugal) POR	Anthony Lopes	0	0	0	0	0	0	0	0
6	MF	(France) FRA	Maxence Caqueret	14	0	6+3	0	1	0	2+2	0
7	FW	(Guinea-Bissau) GBS	Mama Baldé	2	0	0+2	0	0	0	0	0
9	FW	(Nigeria) NGR	Gift Orban	5	2	2+1	2	0	0	1+1	0
12	FW	(Ivory Coast) CIV	Wilfried Zaha	6	0	1+3	0	0	0	0+2	0
14	DF	(Brazil) BRA	Adryelson	1	0	0+1	0	0	0	0	0
17	FW	(Algeria) ALG	Saïd Benrahma	22	3	9+4	1	2	1	3+4	1
25	MF	(Belgium) BEL	Orel Mangala	1	0	1	0	0	0	0	0
30	GK	(France) FRA	Justin Bengui	0	0	0	0	0	0	0	0
34	MF	(France) FRA	Mahamadou Diawara	4	0	0+2	0	0	0	0+2	0

Source: Competitions

=== Goalscorers ===
Rank	No.	Pos.	Nat.	Player	Ligue 1	Coupe de France	UEFA Europa League	Total
1	10	FW	(France)	Alexandre Lacazette	15	0	4	19
1	69	FW	(Georgia (country))	Georges Mikautadze	11	2	4	17
3	18	FW	(France)	Rayan Cherki	8	0	4	12
4	11	FW	(Belgium)	Malick Fofana	5	0	6	11
5	8	MF	(France)	Corentin Tolisso	7	1	2	10
6	37	FW	(Ghana)	Ernest Nuamah	3	0	3	6
7	3	DF	(Argentina)	Nicolás Tagliafico	3	0	2	5
8	17	FW	(Algeria)	Saïd Benrahma	1	1	1	3
9	9	FW	(Nigeria)	Gift Orban	2	0	0	2
9	3	DF	(Brazil)	Abner	1	0	1	2
9	7	MF	(France)	Jordan Veretout	2	0	0	2
9	23	MF	(Argentina)	Thiago Almada	1	0	1	2
13	98	MF	(England)	Ainsley Maitland-Niles	1	0	0	1
13	55	DF	(Croatia)	Duje Ćaleta-Car	1	0	0	1
13	31	MF	(Serbia)	Nemanja Matić	0	1	0	1
13	15	MF	(United States)	Tanner Tessmann	1	0	0	1
Own goals					3	0	0	2
Totals					65	4	29	98

=== Clean sheets ===
Rank	No.	Pos.	Nat.	Player	Ligue 1	Coupe de France	UEFA Europa League	Total
1	23	GK	(Brazil)	Lucas Perri	11	0	3	14
2	40	GK	(France)	Rémy Descamps	0	0	0	0
Totals					11	0	3	14
