= 2023–24 Olympique Lyonnais season =

Olympique Lyonnais
2023–24 season
- President: John Textor
- Head coach: Laurent Blanc (until 11 September); Fabio Grosso (from 18 September to 30 November); Pierre Sage (interim, from 30 November)
- Stadium: Parc Olympique Lyonnais
- Ligue 1: 6th
- Coupe de France: Runners-up
- Top goalscorer: League: Alexandre Lacazette (19); All: Alexandre Lacazette (22)
- Highest home attendance: 57,027 vs Strasbourg (19 May 2024)
- Lowest home attendance: 20,028 vs Nantes (20 December 2023)
- Average home league attendance: 43,700 (73.8% of capacity)
- Biggest win: Lyon 3–0 Toulouse (10 December 2023); Pontarlier 0–3 Lyon (7 January 2024); Lyon 3–0 Valenciennes (2 April 2024)
- Biggest defeat: Lyon 1–4 Montpellier (19 August 2023); Lyon 1–4 Paris Saint-Germain (3 September 2023); Marseille 3–0 Lyon (6 December 2023); Lyon 0–3 Lens (3 March 2024); Paris Saint-Germain 4–1 Lyon (21 April 2024)
Home colours	Away colours	Third colours

The 2023–24 season was the 74th season in the history of Olympique Lyonnais and their 35th consecutive season in the top flight. The club participated in Ligue 1 and the Coupe de France, reaching the final of the latter competition.

This season was Lyon's first ever season under the ownership and presidency of American businessman John Textor, who replaced Jean-Michel Aulas to become the new president, ending Aulas' three-decade rule in the club. On 13 July, Frenchman Santiago Cucci was named to become the new interim executive president of Lyon but later resigned in November. Lyon have had the worst start to a season in the club's history in the French top division, being place in a relegatable position from the 2nd matchday until the 16th matchday. After the nomination of Pierre Sage as the team's interim manager, as well as the numerous reinforcements during the winter transfer window, the club carried out a remarkable comeback, winning 15 out 20 games in Ligue 1 under Sage. The club terminated 6th in the league, which gained them a direct qualification to the 2024–25 UEFA Europa League league phase. Furthermore, the club reached the Coupe de France final for the first time since 2012, but was defeated by Paris Saint-Germain.

== Players ==
=== Squad information ===
Players and squad numbers last updated on 25 May 2024. Appearances include Ligue 1, Coupe de France, Coupe de la Ligue, Trophée des Champions, UEFA Champions League and UEFA Europa League matches.
Note: Flags indicate national team as has been defined under FIFA eligibility rules. Players may hold more than one non-FIFA nationality.

No.	Player	Nat.	Position(s)	Date of birth (age)	Signed in	Contract ends	Transfer fee	Signed from	Apps.	Goals	Notes
Goalkeepers
1	Anthony Lopes	(Portugal)	GK	1 October 1990 (age 36)	2012	2025	N/A	(France) Youth Sector	489	0	Second nationality: France
23	Lucas Perri	(Brazil)	GK	10 December 1997 (age 28)	2024	2028	€3.25M	(Brazil) Botafogo	4	0	Second nationality: Italy
30	Justin Bengui	(France)	GK	9 July 2005 (age 21)	2021	2025	N/A	(France) Youth Sector	0	0	
Defenders
2	Sinaly Diomandé	(Ivory Coast)	CB / RB	9 April 2001 (age 25)	2019	2025	N/A	(France) Youth Sector	85	0	
3	Nicolás Tagliafico	(Argentina)	LB	21 August 1992 (age 34)	2022	2025	€4.2M	(Netherlands) Ajax	69	4	Second nationality: Italy
5	Dejan Lovren	(Croatia)	CB	5 July 1989 (age 37)	2023	2025	Free	(Russia) Zenit Saint Petersburg	134	4	
12	Jake O'Brien	(Republic of Ireland)	CB	15 May 2001 (age 25)	2023	2027	€1M	(England) Crystal Palace	32	5	
14	Adryelson	(Brazil)	CB	28 March 1998 (age 28)	2024	2028	€3.58M	(Brazil) Botafogo	3	0	
20	Saël Kumbedi	(France)	RB	26 March 2005 (age 21)	2022	2027	€1M	(France) Le Havre	42	0	
21	Henrique	(Brazil)	LB	25 April 1994 (age 32)	2021	2024	Free	(Brazil) Vasco da Gama	45	1	
22	Clinton Mata	(Angola)	RB / CB	7 November 1992 (age 34)	2023	2026	€5M	(Belgium) Club Brugge	33	0	Second nationality: Belgium
55	Duje Ćaleta-Car	(Croatia)	CB	17 September 1996 (age 30)	2023	2024	Loan	(England) Southampton	28	0	
Midfielders
4	Paul Akouokou	(Ivory Coast)	DM	20 December 1997 (age 28)	2023	2027	€3M	(Spain) Real Betis	9	0	
6	Maxence Caqueret	(France)	CM	15 February 2000 (age 26)	2018	2026	N/A	(France) Youth Sector	170	7	
8	Corentin Tolisso	(France)	CM	3 August 1994 (age 32)	2022	2027	Free	(Germany) Bayern Munich	224	32	Second nationality: Togo; Originally from youth system
24	Johann Lepenant	(France)	DM	22 October 2002 (age 24)	2022	2027	€4.25M	(France) Caen	40	1	
25	Orel Mangala	(Belgium)	DM	18 March 1998 (age 28)	2024	2024	Loan	(England) Nottingham Forest	12	2	
31	Nemanja Matić	(Serbia)	DM	1 August 1988 (age 38)	2024	2026	€2.6M	(France) Rennes	19	0	
34	Mahamadou Diawara	(France)	CM	17 February 2005 (age 21)	2023	2027	Free	(France) Paris Saint-Germain	12	0	
84	Mohamed El Arouch	(France)	AM	6 April 2004 (age 22)	2021	2025	N/A	(France) Youth Sector	3	0	
98	Ainsley Maitland-Niles	(England)	CM / RB	29 August 1997 (age 29)	2023	2027	Free	(England) Arsenal	29	2	
Forwards
7	Mama Baldé	(Guinea-Bissau)	CF / RW	6 November 1995 (age 31)	2023	2024	Loan	(France) Troyes	23	2	Second nationality: Portugal
9	Gift Orban	(Nigeria)	CF / LW	17 July 2002 (age 24)	2024	2028	€12M	(Belgium) Gent	16	3	
10	Alexandre Lacazette	(France)	CF	28 May 1991 (age 35)	2022	2025	Free	(England) Arsenal	349	182	Originally from youth system
11	Malick Fofana	(Belgium)	LW / RW	31 March 2005 (age 21)	2024	2028	€17M	(Belgium) Gent	21	4	
17	Saïd Benrahma	(Algeria)	LW / AM	10 August 1995 (age 31)	2024	2024	Loan	(England) West Ham United	14	3	
18	Rayan Cherki	(France)	RW / AM	17 August 2003 (age 23)	2019	2025	N/A	(France) Youth Sector	141	17	
37	Ernest Nuamah	(Ghana)	RW / LW	1 November 2003 (age 23)	2023	2024	Loan	(Belgium) Molenbeek	33	3	
Left during the season
7	Amin Sarr	(Sweden)	CF / LW	11 March 2001 (age 25)	2023	2027	€11M	(Netherlands) Heerenveen	18	1	
11	Tino Kadewere	(Zimbabwe)	CF / RW	5 January 1996 (age 30)	2020	2024	€12M	(France) Le Havre	64	11	
15	Achraf Laâziri	(Morocco)	LB	8 July 2003 (age 23)	2022	2027	N/A	(France) Youth Sector	0	0	
16	Mathieu Patouillet	(France)	GK	20 February 2004 (age 22)	2023	2026	N/A	(France) Youth Sector	0	0	
17	Rémy Riou	(France)	GK	6 August 1987 (age 39)	2022	2024	Free	(France) Caen	11	0	Originally from youth system
19	Diego Moreira	(Portugal)	LW / RW	6 August 2004 (age 22)	2023	2024	Loan	(England) Chelsea	9	0	Second nationality: Belgium
26	Bradley Barcola	(France)	LW / RW	2 September 2002 (age 24)	2021	2026	N/A	(France) Youth Sector	47	7	Second nationality: Togo
29	Mamadou Sarr	(France)	CB	29 August 2005 (age 21)	2022	2027	N/A	(France) Youth Sector	3	0	Second nationality: Senegal
47	Jeffinho	(Brazil)	LW / RW	30 December 1999 (age 26)	2023	2027	€10M	(Brazil) Botafogo	21	3	
77	Jeff Reine-Adélaïde	(France)	CM	17 January 1998 (age 28)	2019	2024	€25M	(France) Angers	48	2	
80	Skelly Alvero	(France)	DM	2 May 2002 (age 24)	2023	2028	€4M	(France) Sochaux	8	1	Second nationality: Angola

=== Players from Olympique Lyonnais Reserves and Academy ===
Note: Flags indicate national team as defined under FIFA eligibility rules; some limited exceptions apply. Players may hold more than one non-FIFA nationality.

No.	Pos.	Nation	Player
32	FW	ALG	Djibrail Dib
33	MF	TUN	Chaïm El Djebali
35	DF	FRA	Yacine Chaïb
36	DF	CRO	Téo Barisic
40	GK	FRA	Matéo Pereira
43	DF	NIG	Philippe Boueye

No.	Pos.	Nation	Player
50	GK	MLI	Lassine Diarra
91	FW	ALG	Sekou Lega
—	MF	FRA	Islam Halifa
—	MF	THA	Erawan Garnier
—	FW	ALG	Yannis Lagha

=== Out on loan ===
Note: Flags indicate national team as defined under FIFA eligibility rules; some limited exceptions apply. Players may hold more than one non-FIFA nationality.

No.	Pos.	Nation	Player
7	FW	SWE	Amin Sarr (at (Germany) Wolfsburg until 30 June 2024)
11	FW	ZIM	Tino Kadewere (at (France) Nantes until 30 June 2024)
15	DF	MAR	Achraf Laâziri (at (France) Dunkerque until 30 June 2024)
16	GK	FRA	Mathieu Patouillet (at (France) Sochaux until 30 June 2024)
28	MF	FRA	Florent Da Silva (at (Belgium) Molenbeek until 30 June 2024)

No.	Pos.	Nation	Player
29	DF	FRA	Mamadou Sarr (at (Belgium) Molenbeek until 30 June 2024)
31	DF	FRA	Irvyn Lomani (at (France) Laval until 30 June 2024)
47	FW	BRA	Jeffinho (at (Brazil) Botafogo until 31 December 2024)
80	MF	FRA	Skelly Alvero (at (Germany) Werder Bremen until 30 June 2024)

== Transfers ==
=== In ===
No.	Pos.	Player	Transferred from	Fee	Date	Source
Summer
75	FW	(Cameroon) Karl Toko Ekambi	(France) Rennes	Loan return	30 June 2023	
11	FW	(Zimbabwe) Tino Kadewere	(Spain) Mallorca	Loan return	30 June 2023	
21	MF	(France) Romain Faivre	(France) Lorient	Loan return	30 June 2023	
	DF	(Turkey) Cenk Özkacar	(Spain) Valencia	Loan return	30 June 2023	
	MF	(Mali) Habib Keïta	(Belgium) Kortrijk	Loan return	30 June 2023	
77	MF	(France) Jeff Reine-Adélaïde	(France) Troyes	Loan return	30 June 2023	
	GK	(Germany) Julian Pollersbeck	(France) Lorient	Loan return	30 June 2023	
	FW	(France) Yaya Soumaré	(France) Bourg-en-Bresse	Loan return	30 June 2023	
32	DF	(Senegal) Abdoulaye Ndiaye	(France) Bastia	Loan return	30 June 2023	
28	MF	(France) Florent Da Silva	(Netherlands) Volendam	Loan return	30 June 2023	
	DF	(Mali) Youssouf Koné	(France) Ajaccio	Loan return	30 June 2023	
13	MF	(Brazil) Camilo	(Belgium) Molenbeek	Loan return	30 June 2023	
34	MF	(France) Mahamadou Diawara	(France) Paris Saint-Germain	Free	1 July 2023	
80	MF	(France) Skelly Alvero	(France) Sochaux	€4M	5 July 2023	
22	DF	(Angola) Clinton Mata	(Belgium) Club Brugge	€5M	6 July 2023	
55	DF	(Croatia) Duje Ćaleta-Car	(England) Southampton	Loan (€1.54M)	2 August 2023	
98	MF	(England) Ainsley Maitland-Niles	(England) Arsenal	Free	7 August 2023	
12	DF	(Republic of Ireland) Jake O'Brien	(England) Crystal Palace	€1M	15 August 2023	
7	FW	(Guinea-Bissau) Mama Baldé	(France) Troyes	Loan (€2M)	30 August 2023	
37	FW	(Ghana) Ernest Nuamah	(Belgium) Molenbeek	Loan	30 August 2023	
4	MF	(Ivory Coast) Paul Akouokou	(Spain) Real Betis	€3M	1 September 2023	
19	FW	(Portugal) Diego Moreira	(England) Chelsea	Loan (€2.8M)	1 September 2023	
Winter
23	GK	(Brazil) Lucas Perri	(Brazil) Botafogo	€3.25M	5 January 2024	
14	DF	(Brazil) Adryelson	(Brazil) Botafogo	€3.58M	5 January 2024	
91	FW	(France) Sekou Lega	(France) Bastia	Loan return	10 January 2024	
11	FW	(Belgium) Malick Fofana	(Belgium) Gent	€17M	11 January 2024	
9	FW	(Nigeria) Gift Orban	(Belgium) Gent	€12M	18 January 2024	
31	MF	(Serbia) Nemanja Matić	(France) Rennes	€2.6M	27 January 2024	
25	MF	(Belgium) Orel Mangala	(England) Nottingham Forest	Loan (€11.7M)	1 February 2024	
17	FW	(Algeria) Saïd Benrahma	(England) West Ham United	Loan (€6M)	2 February 2024	

=== Out ===
No.	Pos.	Player	Transferred to	Fee	Date	Source
Summer
27	DF	(France) Malo Gusto	(England) Chelsea	End of loan	30 June 2023	
8	MF	(Algeria) Houssem Aouar	(Italy) Roma	Free	1 July 2023	
9	FW	(France) Moussa Dembélé	(Saudi Arabia) Al-Ettifaq	Free	1 July 2023	
17	DF	(Germany) Jérôme Boateng	(Italy) Salernitana	Free	1 July 2023	
19	DF	(Turkey) Cenk Özkacar	(Spain) Valencia	€5M	1 July 2023	
30	GK	(Germany) Julian Pollersbeck	(Germany) 1. FC Magdeburg	Free	1 July 2023	
19	MF	(Mali) Habib Keïta	(France) Clermont	€1.2M	4 July 2023	
34	FW	(France) Yaya Soumaré	(France) Orléans	Free	4 July 2023	
40	GK	(France) Kayne Bonnevie	(France) Quevilly-Rouen	Free	6 July 2023	
23	MF	(Brazil) Thiago Mendes	(Qatar) Al-Rayyan	€4.21M	7 July 2023	
21	MF	(France) Romain Faivre	(England) Bournemouth	€15M	13 July 2023	
91	FW	(France) Sekou Lega	(France) Bastia	Loan	20 July 2023	
32	DF	(Senegal) Abdoulaye Ndiaye	(France) Troyes	€3.5M	20 July 2023	
28	MF	(France) Florent Da Silva	(Belgium) Molenbeek	Loan	29 July 2023	
13	MF	(Brazil) Camilo	(Russia) Akhmat Grozny	Undisclosed	9 August 2023	
4	DF	(France) Castello Lukeba	(Germany) RB Leipzig	€30M	12 August 2023	
75	FW	(Cameroon) Karl Toko Ekambi	(Saudi Arabia) Abha	€1.5M	25 August 2023	
	DF	(Mali) Youssouf Koné	(Belgium) Molenbeek	Free	28 August 2023	
7	FW	(Sweden) Amin Sarr	(Germany) VfL Wolfsburg	Loan (€1M)	31 August 2023	
26	FW	(France) Bradley Barcola	(France) Paris Saint-Germain	€45M	31 August 2023	
16	GK	(France) Mathieu Patouillet	(France) Sochaux	Loan	1 September 2023	
31	DF	(France) Irvyn Lomani	(France) Laval	Loan	5 September 2023	
36	FW	(Senegal) Pathé Mboup	(Belgium) Molenbeek	Free	6 September 2023	
77	MF	(France) Jeff Reine-Adélaïde	(Belgium) Molenbeek	Free	6 September 2023	
15	DF	(Morocco) Achraf Laâziri	(France) Dunkerque	Loan	16 November 2023	
Winter
11	FW	(Zimbabwe) Tino Kadewere	(France) Nantes	Loan	4 January 2024	
47	FW	(Brazil) Jeffinho	(Brazil) Botafogo	Loan	5 January 2024	
17	GK	(France) Rémy Riou	(France) Paris FC	Free	9 January 2024	
29	DF	(France) Mamadou Sarr	(Belgium) Molenbeek	Loan	18 January 2024	
19	FW	(Portugal) Diego Moreira	(England) Chelsea	End of loan	22 January 2024	
80	MF	(France) Skelly Alvero	(Germany) Werder Bremen	Loan (€0.25M)	31 January 2024	
	FW	(France) Breyton Fougeu	(Turkey) Adana Demirspor	Free	1 February 2024	

=== Transfer summary ===
Spending

Summer: ▼€19,340,000

Winter: ▼€56,130,000

Total: ▼€75,470,000

Income

Summer: ▲€106,410,000

Winter: ▲€250,000

Total: ▲€106,660,000

Net Expenditure

Summer: ▲€87,070,000

Winter: ▼€55,880,000

Total: ▲€31,190,000

== Pre-season and friendlies ==
Win Draw Loss Fixtures

Lyon started the pre-season campaign on 6 July 2023 in the club's training ground in Décines-Charpieu, before traveling to the Netherlands on 9 July for a training camp in the region of Gelderland.

14 July 2023 Friendly	De Treffers (Netherlands)	1–2	(France) Lyon	Groesbeek, Netherlands
19:30 CEST (UTC+2)	Maertzdorf 49' (pen.)	Report	Kadewere 69'; Reine-Adelaide 89' (pen.)	Stadium: Sportpark Zuid

19 July 2023 Friendly	Manchester United (England)	1–0	(France) Lyon	Edinburgh, Scotland
14:00 BST (UTC+1)	Van de Beek 49'	Report		Stadium: Murrayfield Stadium; Attendance: 48,484; Referee: John Beaton (Scotland)

23 July 2023 Friendly	Molenbeek (Belgium)	1–0	(France) Lyon	Brussels, Belgium
18:00 CEST (UTC+2)	El Ouahdi 68'	Report		Stadium: Edmond Machtens Stadium

29 July 2023 Trofeo Memorial Quinocho	Celta Vigo (Spain)	1–0	(France) Lyon	Vigo, Spain
20:00 CEST (UTC+2)	Bamba (yellow card) 20'; Pérez 72'	Report	Kumbedi (yellow card) 43'; Mata (yellow card) 71'	Stadium: Balaídos; Attendance: 12,401; Referee: Miguel González Díaz (Spain)

2 August 2023 Friendly	Lyon (France)	8–2	(Switzerland) Sion	Divonne-les-Bains, France
CEST (UTC+2)		Report		Stadium: Cret d'Eau Sports Complex; Attendance: 0 (behind-closed-doors)

5 August 2023 Friendly	Crystal Palace (England)	2–0	(France) Lyon	Selhurst, England
18:30 BST (UTC+1)	Schlupp 13'; Édouard 58'	Report		Stadium: Selhurst Park; Attendance: 8,000; Referee: Tim Robinson (England)

8 September 2023 Friendly	Lyon (France)	3–2	(France) Auxerre	Décines-Charpieu, France
15:00 CEST (UTC+2)	Akouokou; Baldé; Jeffinho	Report	Jubal; Maddy	Stadium: Stade Gérard Houllier; Attendance: 0 (behind-closed-doors)

== Competitions ==
=== Overall record ===
Competition	First match	Last match	Starting round	Final position	Record							
Competition	First match	Last match	Starting round	Final position	Pld	W	D	L	GF	GA	GD	Win %
Ligue 1	13 August 2023	19 May 2024	Matchday 1	6th	34	16	5	13	49	55	−6	47.06
Coupe de France	7 January 2024	25 May 2024	Round of 64	Runners-up	6	4	1	1	11	4	+7	66.67
Total					40	20	6	14	60	59	+1	50.00

Source: Soccerway

=== Ligue 1 ===
==== League table ====
Pos	Team	Pld	W	D	L	GF	GA	GD	Pts	Qualification or relegation
4	Lille	34	16	11	7	52	34	+18	59	Qualification for the Champions League third qualifying round
5	Nice	34	15	10	9	40	29	+11	55	Qualification for the Europa League league phase (Note: Since the 2023–24 Coupe de France winners, Paris Saint-Germain, qualified for the Champions League via league position, the Europa League berth awarded to the cup winners was passed to the sixth-placed team and the Conference League berth was passed to the seventh-placed team.)
6	Lyon	34	16	5	13	49	55	−6	53	Qualification for the Europa League league phase
7	Lens	34	14	9	11	45	37	+8	51	Qualification for the Conference League play-off round
8	Marseille	34	13	11	10	52	41	+11	50	

Source: Ligue 1
Rules for classification: 1) Points; 2) Goal difference; 3) Head-to-head points; 4) Head-to-head goal difference; 5) Head-to-head goals scored; 6) Head-to-head away goals scored; 7) Goals scored; 8) Away goals scored; 9) Fair-play points (Note: Head-to-head record is used only after all the matches between the teams in question have been played).

==== Results summary ====
Overall								Home						Away					
Pld	W	D	L	GF	GA	GD	Pts	W	D	L	GF	GA	GD	W	D	L	GF	GA	GD
34	16	5	13	49	55	−6	53	7	4	6	25	29	−4	9	1	7	24	26	−2

Source: Ligue 1

==== Results by round ====
Round	1	2	3	4	5	6	7	8	9	10	11	12	13	14	15	16	17	18	19	20	21	22	23	24	25	26	27	28	29	30	31	32	33	34
Ground	A	H	A	H	H	A	A	H	H	A	H	A	H	A	H	A	H	A	H	H	A	H	A	H	A	A	H	A	H	A	H	A	A	H
Result	L	L	D	L	D	L	L	D	L	L	D	W	L	L	W	W	W	L	L	W	W	W	W	L	W	W	D	W	W	L	W	W	W	W
Position	14	17	17	18	16	17	18	17	18	18	18	18	18	18	18	16	15	16	16	15	13	11	10	11	10	10	10	10	9	8	8	7	7	6

Source: Ligue 1
A = Away; H = Home; W = Win; D = Draw; L = Loss

==== Matches ====
The league fixtures were announced on 29 June 2023.

13 August 2023 1	Strasbourg	2–1	Lyon	Strasbourg
20:45 CEST (UTC+2)	Doukouré (yellow card) 8'; Bellegarde (yellow card) 45+4', (goal) 63'; Mothiba 75'	Report	Tolisso (yellow card) 45+4'; Kumbedi (yellow card) 61'; Tagliafico 88'	Stadium: Stade de la Meinau; Attendance: 25,410; Referee: Jérôme Brisard

19 August 2023 2	Lyon	1–4	Montpellier	Décines-Charpieu
19:00 CEST (UTC+2)	Diomandé (yellow card) 13'; Lepenant (yellow card) 29'; Kumbedi (yellow card) 45+4'; Lacazette 69', (red card) 80'; Tagliafico (yellow card) 83'	Report	Nordin 20'; Al-Taamari 39', 66'; Kouyaté (yellow card) 51'; Adams 89'	Stadium: Parc Olympique Lyonnais; Attendance: 42,576; Referee: Mathieu Vernice
Note: The match was originally scheduled for 17:00 CEST, but was postponed by two hours due to the heat wave in Lyon.

27 August 2023 3	Nice	0–0	Lyon	Nice
20:45 CEST (UTC+2)	Ndayishimiye (yellow card) 32'	Report	Tagliafico (yellow card) 90'; Kumbedi (yellow card) 90+2'; Caleta-Car (yellow card) 90+2'; Alvero (yellow card) 90+5'	Stadium: Allianz Riviera; Attendance: 28,033; Referee: Bastien Dechepy

3 September 2023 4	Lyon	1–4	Paris Saint-Germain	Décines-Charpieu
20:45 CEST (UTC+2)	Tolisso (yellow card) 4', (goal) 74' (pen.); Maitland-Niles (yellow card) 58'	Report	Mbappé 4' (pen.), 45+1'; Hakimi 20'; Asensio 38'; Hernandez (yellow card) 48'; Zaïre-Emery (yellow card) 73'	Stadium: Parc Olympique Lyonnais; Attendance: 51,657; Referee: Eric Wattellier

17 September 2023 5	Lyon	0–0	Le Havre	Décines-Charpieu
20:45 CEST (UTC+2)	Lacazette (yellow card) 5'; Mata (yellow card) 41'; Kumbedi (yellow card) 79'	Report	Bayo (yellow card) 38'; Casimir (yellow card) 65'	Stadium: Parc Olympique Lyonnais; Attendance: 35,507; Referee: Benoît Bastien

23 September 2023 6	Brest	1–0	Lyon	Brest
21:00 CEST (UTC+2)	Lees-Melou (yellow card) 31'; Camara (yellow card) 64'; Brassier (yellow card) 81'; Mounié 87'	Report	Nuamah (yellow card) 10'	Stadium: Stade Francis-Le Blé; Attendance: 14,636; Referee: Thomas Léonard

1 October 2023 7	Reims	2–0	Lyon	Reims
13:00 CEST (UTC+2)	Abdelhamid (yellow card) 37', (goal) 71'; Munetsi 45+1'; Teuma (yellow card) 60'	Report	Alvero (yellow card) 35'; Caqueret (yellow card) 52'	Stadium: Stade Auguste-Delaune; Attendance: 16,477; Referee: François Letexier

8 October 2023 8	Lyon	3–3	Lorient	Décines-Charpieu
15:00 CEST (UTC+2)	Nuamah 21'; Lacazette 22', 41' (pen.)	Report	Kroupi 16', 54'; Yongwa 79'	Stadium: Parc Olympique Lyonnais; Attendance: 43,100; Referee: Clément Turpin

22 October 2023 9	Lyon	1–2	Clermont	Décines-Charpieu
20:45 CEST (UTC+2)	Lovren (yellow card) 19'; Henrique (yellow card) 32'; Ogier 52' (o.g.); Tolisso (yellow card) 68'; O'Brien (yellow card) 90+4'	Report	Cham 10'; Gastien (yellow card) 22'; Magnin 35'; Ogier (yellow card) 45+2'; Seidu (yellow card) 86'; Rashani (yellow card) 90+5'; Diaw (yellow card) 90+7'	Stadium: Parc Olympique Lyonnais; Attendance: 43,999; Referee: Willy Delajod

5 November 2023 11	Lyon	1–1	Metz	Décines-Charpieu
13:00 CET (UTC+1)	Diomandé (yellow card) 19'; Alvero 84'	Report	Jallow 77'; Van Den Kerkhof (yellow card) 88'	Stadium: Parc Olympique Lyonnais; Attendance: 42,040; Referee: Benoît Millot

12 November 2023 12	Rennes	0–1	Lyon	Rennes
17:05 CET (UTC+1)	G. Doué (red card) 5'; Salah (yellow card) 45'; Theate (yellow card) 75'; Matić (yellow card) 75'	Report	O'Brien 67'; Tagliafico (yellow card) 79'	Stadium: Roazhon Park; Attendance: 28,441; Referee: Stéphanie Frappart

26 November 2023 13	Lyon	0–2	Lille	Décines-Charpieu
20:45 CET (UTC+1)	Baldé (yellow card) 66'; Akouokou (yellow card) 72'	Report	Gudmundsson (yellow card) 13'; David 27'; Santos 32', (yellow card) 32'	Stadium: Parc Olympique Lyonnais; Attendance: 40,029; Referee: Eric Wattellier

2 December 2023 14	Lens	3–2	Lyon	Lens
17:00 CET (UTC+1)	Saïd 26'; Machado (yellow card) 34'; Medina (yellow card) 41'; Frankowski 52' (pen.), 74'; Sotoca (red card) 90+1'	Report	O'Brien 15', 72'	Stadium: Stade Bollaert-Delelis; Attendance: 38,130; Referee: Clément Turpin

6 December 2023 10	Marseille	3–0	Lyon	Marseille
21:00 CET (UTC+1)	Vitinha 21'; Murillo 25'; Ounahi (yellow card) 49'; Aubameyang 55'	Report	Lovren (yellow card) 21'; Diawara (yellow card) 87'	Stadium: Stade Vélodrome; Attendance: 54,238; Referee: François Letexier
Note: The match was originally scheduled for 29 October 2023, but was postponed after the Lyon team bus was attacked by projectiles and head coach Fabio Grosso was injured.

10 December 2023 15	Lyon	3–0	Toulouse	Décines-Charpieu
17:05 CET (UTC+1)	Lacazette 25', 29', 80'; Diawara (yellow card) 68'; Moreira (yellow card) 87'	Report	Sierro (yellow card) 41'; Dallinga (penalty missed) 45+2'; Dønnum (yellow card) 63'; Diarra (yellow card) 79'	Stadium: Parc Olympique Lyonnais; Attendance: 36,777; Referee: Pierre Gaillouste

15 December 2023 16	Monaco	0–1	Lyon	Monaco
21:00 CET (UTC+1)	Singo (yellow card) 29'	Report	Mata (yellow card) 31'; Jeffinho 85'; Henrique (yellow card) 90+5'	Stadium: Stade Louis II; Attendance: 5,324; Referee: Ruddy Buquet

20 December 2023 17	Lyon	1–0	Nantes	Décines-Charpieu
21:00 CET (UTC+1)	Lacazette 49'; Lovren (red card) 84'; Tagliafico (yellow card) 90+5'	Report	Centonze (yellow card) 8'; Duverne (yellow card) 31'	Stadium: Parc Olympique Lyonnais; Attendance: 20,028; Referee: Benoît Bastien

14 January 2024 18	Le Havre	3–1	Lyon	Le Havre
17:05 CET (UTC+1)	Lloris 18'; Sabbi 50'; Opéri 62', (yellow card) 87'	Report	O'Brien (red card) 30'; Lacazette 54'; Ćaleta-Car (red card) 90'	Stadium: Stade Océane; Attendance: 23,146; Referee: Gaël Angoula

26 January 2024 19	Lyon	2–3	Rennes	Décines-Charpieu
21:00 CET (UTC+1)	Mata (yellow card) 33'; Henrique 57'; Nuamah (yellow card) 58'; Lacazette 78'	Report	Santamaria (yellow card) 7'; Terrier 22', 41'; D. Doué 36'; Truffert (yellow card) 66'	Stadium: Parc Olympique Lyonnais; Attendance: 40,516; Referee: Thomas Léonard

4 February 2024 20	Lyon	1–0	Marseille	Décines-Charpieu
20:45 CET (UTC+1)	Lacazette 37'; O'Brien (yellow card) 40'; Matić (yellow card) 61'	Report	Ounahi (yellow card) 75'	Stadium: Parc Olympique Lyonnais; Attendance: 46,380; Referee: Benoît Bastien

11 February 2024 21	Montpellier	1–2	Lyon	Montpellier
17:05 CET (UTC+1)	Nordin 23'; Ferri (yellow card) 90'	Report	Tagliafico (yellow card) 28'; Lacazette 74'; Caqueret 82'; Orban (yellow card) 90'	Stadium: Stade de la Mosson; Attendance: 15,519; Referee: Pierre Gaillouste

16 February 2024 22	Lyon	1–0	Nice	Décines-Charpieu
21:00 CET (UTC+1)	Mangala 22'	Report	Ndayishimiye (yellow card) 9'	Stadium: Parc Olympique Lyonnais; Attendance: 48,033; Referee: Clément Turpin

23 February 2024 23	Metz	1–2	Lyon	Longeville-lès-Metz
21:00 CET (UTC+1)	Mikautadze 13'; Camara (yellow card) 81'	Report	Lacazette 45+1'; Benrahma 60'; Mata (yellow card) 73'; O'Brien (yellow card) 87'	Stadium: Stade Saint-Symphorien; Attendance: 27,560; Referee: Marc Bollengier

3 March 2024 24	Lyon	0–3	Lens	Décines-Charpieu
20:45 CET (UTC+1)	Maitland-Niles (red card) 84'	Report	Gradit (yellow card) 29'; Sotoca 43'; Wahi 53' (pen.); Danso (yellow card) 83', (goal) 87'	Stadium: Parc Olympique Lyonnais; Attendance: 48,242; Referee: Jérôme Brisard

9 March 2024 25	Lorient	0–2	Lyon	Lorient
17:00 CET (UTC+1)		Report	Tagliafico 52'; Baldé 64'	Stadium: Stade du Moustoir; Attendance: 16,426; Referee: Mathieu Vernice

15 March 2024 26	Toulouse	2–3	Lyon	Toulouse
21:00 CET (UTC+1)	Spierings (yellow card) 43'; Dønnum (yellow card) 45+2'; Dallinga 53'; Sierro 59' (pen.)	Report	Lacazette 33'; Tolisso (yellow card) 37'; Mata (yellow card) 45+1'; Cherki 77'; O'Brien 81'	Stadium: Stade de Toulouse; Attendance: 28,436; Referee: Jérémy Stinat

30 March 2024 27	Lyon	1–1	Reims	Décines-Charpieu
21:00 CET (UTC+1)	Nuamah 65'; Ćaleta-Car (yellow card) 71'; Tolisso (yellow card) 76'	Report	Khadra (yellow card) 20'; Okumu 55'; Richardson (yellow card) 78'; Munetsi (yellow card) 90'	Stadium: Parc Olympique Lyonnais; Attendance: 43,097; Referee: Thomas Léonard

7 April 2024 28	Nantes	1–3	Lyon	Nantes
20:45 CEST (UTC+2)	Abline 16'; Cömert (yellow card) 18'; Mohamed (yellow card) 74'	Report	Lacazette (yellow card) 53', (goal) 75'; Nuamah (yellow card) 71'; Fofana 77'; Orban 90+7'	Stadium: Stade de la Beaujoire; Attendance: 0 Referee: Jérôme Brisard

14 April 2024 29	Lyon	4–3	Brest	Décines-Charpieu
20:45 CEST (UTC+2)	Tolisso 18'; Benrahma (yellow card) 57'; Tagliafico (yellow card) 59' (yellow-red card) 87', (goal) 79'; Lacazette 70'; O'Brien (yellow card) 87'; Matić (yellow card) 90+10'; Maitland-Niles 90+15' (pen.)	Report	Brassier (yellow card) 17'; Lees-Melou (yellow card) 45+2' (yellow-red card) 87'; Mounié 60'; Del Castillo 64', 67'; Locko (yellow card) 87'; Bizot (yellow card) 90+11'	Stadium: Parc Olympique Lyonnais; Attendance: 47,958; Referee: Mathieu Vernice

21 April 2024 30	Paris Saint-Germain	4–1	Lyon	Paris
21:00 CEST (UTC+2)	Matić 3' (o.g.); Beraldo 6'; Ramos 33', 42'	Report	Nuamah 37'	Stadium: Parc des Princes; Attendance: 47,700; Referee: François Letexier

28 April 2024 31	Lyon	3–2	Monaco	Décines-Charpieu
19:00 CEST (UTC+2)	Lacazette 22'; Benrahma 26', (yellow card) 38'; Fofana 84'	Report	Ben Yedder 2', 61'; Minamino (yellow card) 25'; Ouattara (yellow card) 47'; Diatta (yellow card) 69'	Stadium: Parc Olympique Lyonnais; Attendance: 55,939; Referee: Bastien Dechepy

6 May 2024 32	Lille	3–4	Lyon	Villeneuve-d'Ascq
21:00 CEST (UTC+2)	Diakité 21', 85'; Gomes (yellow card) 28'; Zhegrova 37'; Haraldsson (yellow card) 80'; Yoro (yellow card) 90+4'	Report	Nuamah (yellow card) 35'; Benrahma 66'; Fofana 82'; Lacazette 89'; Baldé 90+2'	Stadium: Stade Pierre-Mauroy; Attendance: 45,227; Referee: Benoît Bastien

12 May 2024 33	Clermont	0–1	Lyon	Clermont-Ferrand
21:00 CEST (UTC+2)	Cham (yellow card) 90+3'	Report	Mangala 53'; Orban (yellow card) 62'; Mata (yellow card) 89'	Stadium: Stade Gabriel Montpied; Attendance: 10,603; Referee: Pierre Gaillouste

19 May 2024 34	Lyon	2–1	Strasbourg	Décines-Charpieu
21:00 CEST (UTC+2)	Lacazette 40', 90+6' (pen.), (yellow card) 90+8'	Report	Diarra 63'; Emegha (penalty missed) 77'; Andrey Santos (yellow card) 90+8'	Stadium: Parc Olympique Lyonnais; Attendance: 57,027; Referee: Eric Wattellier

=== Coupe de France ===
7 January 2024 Round of 64	Pontarlier	0–3	Lyon	Besançon
14:30 CET (UTC+1)	Cissé (yellow card) 32'	Report	Caqueret (yellow card) 9'; Cherki 45'; Maitland-Niles 52'; Lacazette 56'; Sarr (yellow card) 82'	Stadium: Stade Léo Lagrange; Attendance: 10,132; Referee: Nicolas Rainville

19 January 2024 Round of 32	Bergerac	1–2	Lyon	Libourne
20:45 CET (UTC+1)	Escarpit 45+1'; Gyeboaho (red card) 65'; Dumai (yellow card) 73'	Report	Adryelson (yellow card) 4'; Fofana 37'; Caqueret 78'; Tagliafico (yellow card) 90+2'	Stadium: Stade Jean-Antoine Moueix; Attendance: 9,106; Referee: Florent Batta

7 February 2024 Round of 16	Lyon	2–1	Lille	Décines-Charpieu
18:30 CET (UTC+1)	Orban 39'; Cherki 46'; Tagliafico (yellow card) 65'; Ćaleta-Car (yellow card) 68'	Report	Alexsandro 54'	Stadium: Parc Olympique Lyonnais; Attendance: 29,085; Referee: Benoît Millot

27 February 2024 Quarter-finals	Lyon	0–0 (4–3 p)	Strasbourg	Décines-Charpieu
20:45 CET (UTC+1)	Ćaleta-Car (yellow card) 88'	Report	Mwanga (yellow card) 64'; Sissoko (yellow card) 88'; Bellaarouch (yellow card) 90+1'	Stadium: Parc Olympique Lyonnais; Attendance: 56,602; Referee: Benoît Bastien
	Penalties
	Caqueret (penalty scored); Orban (penalty scored); Maitland-Niles (penalty scored); Cherki (penalty scored)		(penalty missed) Delaine; (penalty scored) Doukouré; (penalty scored) Sissoko; (penalty scored) Emegha; (penalty missed) Perrin

2 April 2024 Semi-finals	Lyon	3–0	Valenciennes	Décines-Charpieu
20:45 CEST (UTC+2)	Mata (yellow card) 39'; Lacazette 51' (pen.), 57', (yellow card) 51'; Orban 75'	Report	Woudenberg (yellow card) 73'; Flamarion (yellow card) 90+2'; Basse (yellow card) 90+5'	Stadium: Parc Olympique Lyonnais; Attendance: 56,719; Referee: Stéphanie Frappart

25 May 2024 Final	Lyon	1–2	Paris Saint-Germain	Villeneuve-d'Ascq
21:00 CEST (UTC+2)	Ćaleta-Car (yellow card) 45+2'; O'Brien 55'; Tagliafico (yellow card) 88'	Report	Dembélé 22', (yellow card) 88'; Fabián 34'	Stadium: Stade Pierre-Mauroy; Attendance: 46,577; Referee: François Letexier

== Statistics ==
=== Appearances and goals ===
No.	Pos	Nat	Player	Total		Ligue 1		Coupe de France	
No.	Pos	Nat	Player	Apps	Goals	Apps	Goals	Apps	Goals
Goalkeepers
1	GK	(Portugal) POR	Anthony Lopes	33	0	31	0	2	0
23	GK	(Brazil) BRA	Lucas Perri	4	0	0	0	4	0
30	GK	(France) FRA	Justin Bengui	0	0	0	0	0	0
Defenders
2	DF	(Ivory Coast) CIV	Sinaly Diomandé	10	0	10	0	0	0
3	DF	(Argentina) ARG	Nicolás Tagliafico	31	3	25	3	6	0
5	DF	(Croatia) CRO	Dejan Lovren	11	0	8+2	0	1	0
12	DF	(Republic of Ireland) IRL	Jake O'Brien	32	5	27	4	5	1
14	DF	(Brazil) BRA	Adryelson	3	0	0+2	0	1	0
20	DF	(France) FRA	Saël Kumbedi	19	0	8+9	0	1+1	0
21	DF	(Brazil) BRA	Henrique	13	1	6+5	1	1+1	0
22	DF	(Angola) ANG	Clinton Mata	33	0	25+3	0	3+2	0
55	DF	(Croatia) CRO	Duje Ćaleta-Car	29	0	22+2	0	5	0
Midfielders
4	MF	(Ivory Coast) CIV	Paul Akouokou	9	0	4+4	0	0+1	0
6	MF	(France) FRA	Maxence Caqueret	40	2	34	1	6	1
8	MF	(France) FRA	Corentin Tolisso	30	3	21+4	3	4+1	0
24	MF	(France) FRA	Johann Lepenant	6	0	2+4	0	0	0
25	MF	(Belgium) BEL	Orel Mangala	12	2	4+4	2	3+1	0
31	MF	(Serbia) SRB	Nemanja Matić	19	0	15	0	3+1	0
33	MF	(Tunisia) TUN	Chaïm El Djebali	1	0	0+1	0	0	0
34	MF	(France) FRA	Mahamadou Diawara	12	0	4+7	0	0+1	0
84	MF	(France) FRA	Mohamed El Arouch	1	0	0+1	0	0	0
98	MF	(England) ENG	Ainsley Maitland-Niles	29	2	16+7	1	3+3	1
Forwards
7	FW	(Guinea-Bissau) GBS	Mama Baldé	23	2	4+16	2	0+3	0
9	FW	(Nigeria) NGR	Gift Orban	16	3	5+8	1	1+2	2
10	FW	(France) FRA	Alexandre Lacazette	35	22	27+2	19	5+1	3
11	FW	(Belgium) BEL	Malick Fofana	21	4	4+13	3	2+2	1
17	FW	(Algeria) ALG	Saïd Benrahma	15	3	10+2	3	3	0
18	FW	(France) FRA	Rayan Cherki	38	3	19+13	1	4+2	2
37	FW	(Ghana) GHA	Ernest Nuamah	33	3	21+8	3	2+2	0
Players transferred out during the season
7	FW	(Sweden) SWE	Amin Sarr	3	0	1+2	0	0	0
11	FW	(Zimbabwe) ZIM	Tino Kadewere	12	0	2+10	0	0	0
15	DF	(Morocco) MAR	Achraf Laâziri	0	0	0	0	0	0
16	GK	(France) FRA	Mathieu Patouillet	0	0	0	0	0	0
17	GK	(France) FRA	Rémy Riou	4	0	3	0	0+1	0
19	FW	(Portugal) POR	Diego Moreira	9	0	4+3	0	1+1	0
26	FW	(France) FRA	Bradley Barcola	3	0	3	0	0	0
29	DF	(France) FRA	Mamadou Sarr	2	0	0+1	0	0+1	0
47	FW	(Brazil) BRA	Jeffinho	10	1	3+7	1	0	0
77	MF	(France) FRA	Jeff Reine-Adélaïde	0	0	0	0	0	0
80	MF	(France) FRA	Skelly Alvero	8	1	6+2	1	0	0

Source: Competitions

=== Goalscorers ===
Rank	No.	Pos.	Nat.	Player	Ligue 1	Coupe de France	Total
1	10	FW	(France)	Alexandre Lacazette	19	3	22
2	12	DF	(Republic of Ireland)	Jake O'Brien	4	1	5
3	11	FW	(Belgium)	Malick Fofana	3	1	4
4	18	FW	(France)	Rayan Cherki	1	2	3
4	9	FW	(Nigeria)	Gift Orban	1	2	3
4	3	DF	(Argentina)	Nicolás Tagliafico	3	0	3
4	37	FW	(Ghana)	Ernest Nuamah	3	0	3
4	17	FW	(Algeria)	Saïd Benrahma	3	0	3
9	6	MF	(France)	Maxence Caqueret	1	1	2
9	8	MF	(France)	Corentin Tolisso	2	0	2
9	98	MF	(England)	Ainsley Maitland-Niles	1	1	2
9	7	FW	(Guinea-Bissau)	Mama Baldé	2	0	2
9	25	MF	(Belgium)	Orel Mangala	2	0	2
14	80	MF	(France)	Skelly Alvero	1	0	1
14	47	FW	(Brazil)	Jeffinho	1	0	1
14	21	DF	(Brazil)	Henrique	1	0	1
Own goals					1	0	1
Totals					49	11	60

=== Assists ===
Rank	No.	Pos.	Nat.	Player	Ligue 1	Coupe de France	Total
1	18	FW	(France)	Rayan Cherki	6	3	9
2	10	FW	(France)	Alexandre Lacazette	2	2	4
2	98	MF	(England)	Ainsley Maitland-Niles	4	0	4
2	17	FW	(Algeria)	Saïd Benrahma	3	1	4
5	20	DF	(France)	Saël Kumbedi	2	1	3
5	6	MF	(France)	Maxence Caqueret	3	0	3
5	7	FW	(Guinea-Bissau)	Mama Baldé	3	0	3
5	22	DF	(Angola)	Clinton Mata	3	0	3
9	47	FW	(Brazil)	Jeffinho	2	0	2
9	3	DF	(Argentina)	Nicolás Tagliafico	2	0	2
9	37	FW	(Ghana)	Ernest Nuamah	2	0	2
9	12	DF	(Republic of Ireland)	Jake O'Brien	2	0	2
9	8	MF	(France)	Corentin Tolisso	1	1	2
Totals					32	8	40

=== Clean sheets ===
Rank	No.	Pos.	Nat.	Player	Ligue 1	Coupe de France	Total
1	1	GK	(Portugal)	Anthony Lopes	9	1	10
2	23	GK	(Brazil)	Lucas Perri	0	2	2
3	17	GK	(France)	Rémy Riou	1	0	1
Totals					10	3	13
