= 2024 Coupe de France final =

Football match

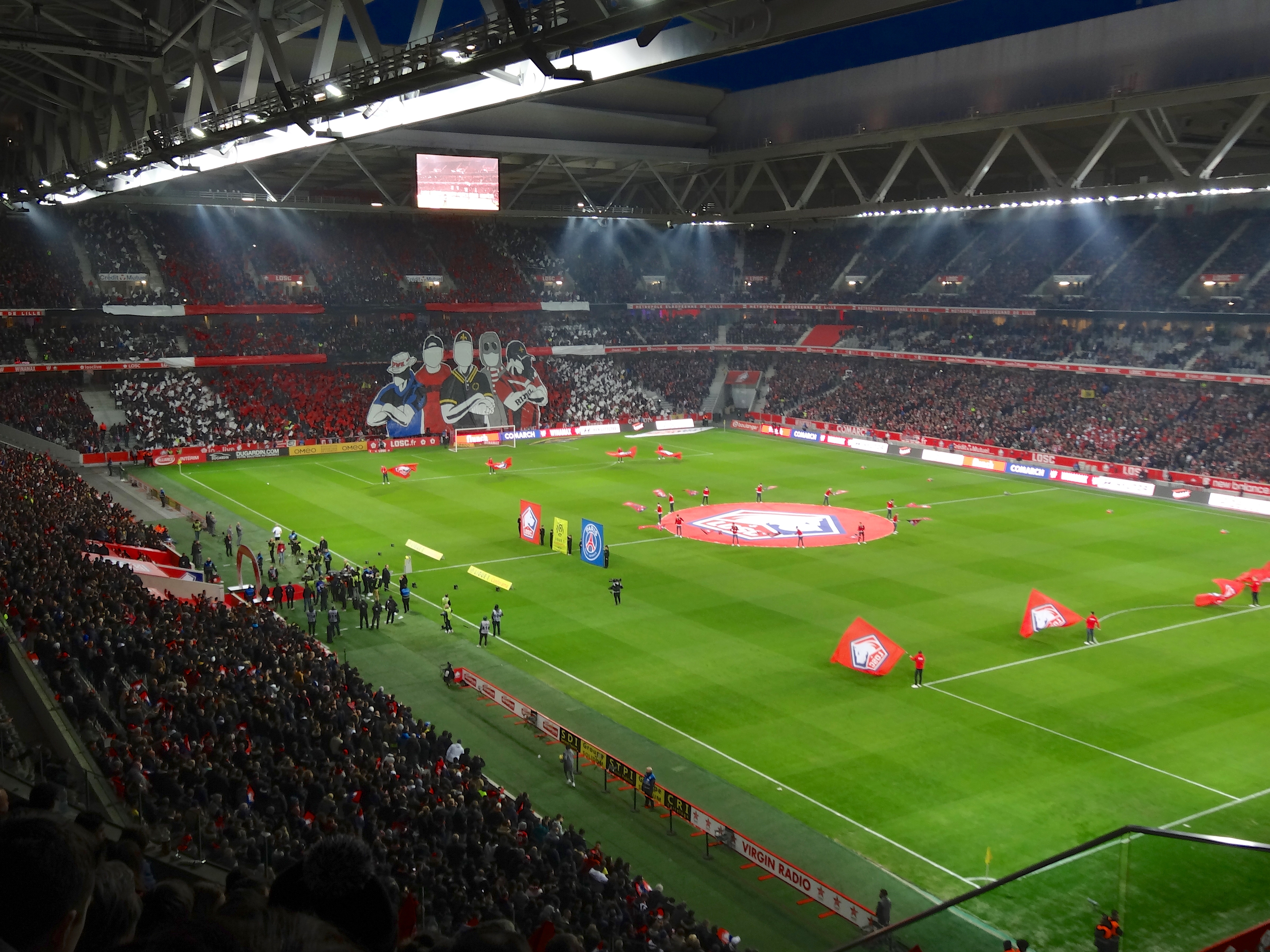
- The Stade Pierre-Mauroy hosted the final.
- Event: 2023–24 Coupe de France
Lyon	Paris Saint-Germain
Ligue 1	Ligue 1
1	2
- Date: 25 May 2024
- Venue: Stade Pierre-Mauroy, Villeneuve-d'Ascq
- Referee: François Letexier
- Attendance: 46,577

The 2024 Coupe de France final was a football match between Lyon and Paris Saint-Germain to decide the winner of the 2023–24 Coupe de France, the 107th season of the Coupe de France.

Due to the upgrade works at the Stade de France for the Olympic Games and Paralympics, the final was relocated to the Stade Pierre-Mauroy in Villeneuve-d'Ascq. This marked the first time in the history of the competition that a final was contested outside Paris (or its near suburbs).

Paris Saint-Germain won the match 2–1 for their record-extending fifteenth Coupe de France title.

== Route to the final ==
Lyon		Round	Paris Saint-Germain
Opponent	Result	2023–24 Coupe de France	Opponent	Result
Pontarlier	3–0 (A)	Round of 64	US Revel	9–0 (A)
Bergerac	2–1 (A)	Round of 32	US Orléans	4–1 (A)
Lille	2–1 (H)	Round of 16	Brest	3–1 (H)
Strasbourg	0–0 (4–3 pen.) (H)	Quarter-finals	Nice	3–1 (H)
Valenciennes	3–0 (H)	Semi-finals	Rennes	1–0 (H)

Note: H = home fixture, A = away fixture

== Match ==
=== Details ===
25 May 2024
21:00 CEST

Lyon	1–2	Paris Saint-Germain
O'Brien 55'	Report	Dembélé 22'; Fabián 34'

Stade Pierre-Mauroy, Villeneuve-d'Ascq
Attendance: 46,577
Referee: François Letexier

Lyon	Paris Saint-Germain

GK	23	(Brazil) Lucas Perri
RB	22	(Angola) Clinton Mata		(substituted off) 73'
CB	12	(Republic of Ireland) Jake O'Brien
CB	55	(Croatia) Duje Ćaleta-Car	(yellow card) 45+2'
LB	3	(Argentina) Nicolás Tagliafico	(yellow card) 88'
DM	31	(Serbia) Nemanja Matić		(substituted off) 86'
CM	6	(France) Maxence Caqueret
CM	8	(France) Corentin Tolisso		(substituted off) 74'
RW	18	(France) Rayan Cherki		(substituted off) 67'
CF	10	(France) Alexandre Lacazette (c)
LW	17	(Algeria) Saïd Benrahma		(substituted off) 74'
Substitutes:
GK	1	(Portugal) Anthony Lopes
DF	14	(Brazil) Adryelson
DF	21	(Brazil) Henrique
MF	25	(Belgium) Orel Mangala		(substituted in) 74'
MF	98	(England) Ainsley Maitland-Niles		(substituted in) 73'
FW	7	(Guinea-Bissau) Mama Baldé		(substituted in) 86'
FW	9	(Nigeria) Gift Orban
FW	11	(Belgium) Malick Fofana		(substituted in) 74'
FW	37	(Ghana) Ernest Nuamah		(substituted in) 67'
Manager:
(France) Pierre Sage

GK	99	(Italy) Gianluigi Donnarumma
RB	2	(Morocco) Achraf Hakimi
CB	5	(Brazil) Marquinhos (c)
CB	35	(Brazil) Lucas Beraldo
LB	25	(Portugal) Nuno Mendes
DM	17	(Portugal) Vitinha
CM	33	(France) Warren Zaïre-Emery
CM	8	(Spain) Fabián Ruiz
RW	10	(France) Ousmane Dembélé	(yellow card) 88'	(substituted off) 90+2'
CF	7	(France) Kylian Mbappé
LW	29	(France) Bradley Barcola		(substituted off) 85'
Substitutes:
GK	80	(Spain) Arnau Tenas
DF	15	(Portugal) Danilo Pereira
DF	37	(Slovakia) Milan Škriniar
DF	42	(France) Yoram Zague
MF	4	(Uruguay) Manuel Ugarte
MF	19	(South Korea) Lee Kang-in		(substituted in) 85'
FW	9	(Portugal) Gonçalo Ramos
FW	11	(Spain) Marco Asensio		(substituted in) 90+2'
FW	23	(France) Randal Kolo Muani
Manager:
(Spain) Luis Enrique

Assistant referees:
Erwan Finjean
Mehdi Rahmouni
Fourth official:
Jérôme Brisard
Video assistant referees:
Bastien Dechepy
Yohann Rouinsard
Reserve assistant referee:
Christophe Mouysset

Match rules

- 90 minutes
- 30 minutes of extra time if necessary
- Penalty shoot-out if scores still level
- Nine named substitutes
- Maximum of five substitutions, with a sixth allowed in extra time (Note: Each team was given only three opportunities to make substitutions, with a fourth opportunity in extra time, excluding substitutions made at half-time, before the start of extra time and at half-time in extra time.)
