= Mahamadou Diawara =

French footballer (born 2005)

Personal information
- Date of birth: 17 February 2005 (age 21)
- Place of birth: Longjumeau, France
- Height: 1.87 m (6 ft 2 in)
- Position: Midfielder

Team information
- Current team: Red Star (on loan from Lyon)
- Number: 14

Youth career
- Longjumeau
- 2018–2023: Paris Saint-Germain

Senior career*
Years	Team	Apps	(Gls)
2023–	Lyon B	8	(1)
2023–	Lyon	13	(0)
2025	→ Le Havre (loan)	15	(0)
2025–2026	→ Antwerp (loan)	8	(0)
2026–	→ Red Star (loan)	1	(0)

International career
2023–2024	France U19	3	(0)
- * Club domestic league appearances and goals as of 4 September 2026

Mahamadou Diawara (born 17 February 2005) is a French professional footballer who plays as a midfielder for Ligue 2 club Red Star on loan from Lyon.

== Club career ==
Born in Longjumeau in Île-de-France, Diawara joined the youth academy of the region's giant Paris Saint-Germain in 2018, where he spent five years.

In June 2023, he joined Lyon, signing his first professional contract with the team. On 8 October 2023, he made his professional debut against Lorient in a Ligue 1 game.

On 17 January 2025, Diawara joined Le Havre on loan for the rest of the 2024–25 season.

On 8 September 2025, Diawara was loaned to Belgian Pro League side Royal Antwerp until June 2026.

== International career ==
Selected in the France U19 team since 2023, Diawara decided to leave the U19 national selection in March 2024, not accepting the French Football Federation's decision of prohibiting the practice of Ramadan for the Muslim players.

== Personal life ==
Born in France, Diawara is of Malian descent.

== Career statistics ==
As of match played 8 December 2025

Appearances and goals by club, season and competition
Club	Season	League			Cup		Europe		Other		Total	
Club	Season	Division	Apps	Goals	Apps	Goals	Apps	Goals	Apps	Goals	Apps	Goals
Lyon B	2023–24	CFA 2	7	1	—		—		1 (Note: Appearance(s) in Premier League International Cup)	0	8	1
Lyon	2023–24	Ligue 1	11	0	1	0	—		—		12	0
Lyon	2024–25	Ligue 1	2	0	0	0	2 (Note: Appearances in UEFA Europa League)	0	—		4	0
Lyon	2026–27	Ligue 1	0	0	0	0	0	0	—		0	0
Lyon	Total		13	0	1	0	2	0	—		16	0
Le Havre (loan)	2024–25	Ligue 1	15	0	—		—		—		15	0
Royal Antwerp	2025–26	Belgian Pro League	8	0	1	0	—		—		9	0
Career total			43	1	2	0	2	0	1	0	48	1

== Honours ==
Lyon

- Coupe de France runner-up: 2023–24
