= Gift Orban =

Nigerian footballer (born 2002)

Personal information
- Full name: Gift Emmanuel Orban
- Date of birth: 17 July 2002 (age 24)
- Place of birth: Benue State, Nigeria
- Height: 1.78 m (5 ft 10 in)
- Position: Striker

Team information
- Current team: Amedspor (on loan from TSG Hoffenheim)
- Number: 99

Youth career
- –2021: Bison
- 2021–2022: Stabæk

Senior career*
Years	Team	Apps	(Gls)
2022–2023	Stabæk	22	(16)
2023–2024	Gent	33	(18)
2024–2025	Lyon	16	(3)
2025–	TSG Hoffenheim	13	(4)
2025–2026	→ Hellas Verona (loan)	28	(7)
2026–	→ Amedspor (loan)	11	(10)
- * Club domestic league appearances and goals as of 8 November 2026

Gift Emmanuel Orban (born 17 July 2002) is a Nigerian professional footballer who plays as a striker for Süper Lig club Amedspor, on loan from Bundesliga club TSG Hoffenheim.

== Club career ==
=== Stabæk ===
In November 2021, Orban was scouted by Stabæk's Torgeir Bjarmann and Thomas Finstad in Nigeria during a showcase tournament. He trained with Stabæk during the winter of the 2021–22 season, before returning after his visa expired. Returning to Norway, he signed for Stabæk in late May 2022. The transfer from Nigerian club Bison was a loan with an option to buy.

Orban scored his first goals in cup matches against semi-professional teams Notodden and Gjøvik-Lyn (twice). After this, he became a starting player for Stabæk. His goal against SK Brann was compared to Alanzinho's time at Stabæk. VG also called him a "striker jewel".

When Stabæk sold Oliver Valaker Edvardsen in July, the club announced they would spend the money on Orban's buyout option. The contract tying Orban to Stabæk until the end of 2026 was announced on 3 August. He became the top scorer in the 2022 Norwegian First Division with 16 goals, alongside Bård Finne. Helping Stabæk win promotion to 2023 Eliteserien, Orban was also named Young Player of the Year in the First Division.

=== Gent ===
On 31 January 2023, Orban joined Belgian Pro League side Gent on a permanent deal. On 11 February, Orban scored two goals on his Pro League debut in a 3–3 draw with Westerlo. On 12 March, Orban managed to score four goals in a 6–2 away win over Zulte Waregem, which made him the first Gent player to do so in the 21st century. All the goals came in the second-half. In his very next game on 15 March, he scored a first-half hat-trick in 4–1 away win over İstanbul Başakşehir in the UEFA Europa Conference League round 16. The hat-trick was scored within three minutes and 25 seconds, setting a new record for the fastest hat-trick in UEFA club competitions, breaking the previous record of six minutes and 12 seconds held by Mohamed Salah in the Champions League. In the 2023–24 Europa Conference League campaign of KAA Gent, Orban scored another European hat-trick, this time against Pogoń Szczecin in the first leg of the third qualification round, resulting in a 5–0 win for Gent.

=== Lyon ===
On 18 January 2024, Orban signed a four-and-a-half-year contract with Ligue 1 side Lyon, for a transfer fee of €12 million, which could rise to €20 million with add-ons, and a 20% sell-on clause. Orban had a slow start in his first season at Lyon, scoring only one league goal in 13 appearances. He did score twice in the Coupe de France in three games as Lyon made the 2024 Coupe de France final – however, Orban was unused substitute in the final. At the end of the season, Orban admitted that it had been "difficult to settle in".

On his first appearance in the 2024–25 season, Orban came off the bench with his side 3–2 down against Strasbourg and scored twice in nine minutes to win the game for Lyon.

=== TSG Hoffenheim ===
On 2 January 2025, Orban was signed by Bundesliga club TSG Hoffenheim for €9 million with up to €3 million in potential bonuses, of which €1 million is guaranteed. The deal also included a 7.5% sell-on clause for Lyon. On 26 January, Orban scored his first goal for the club after coming on as a substitute in the 63rd-minute against Eintracht Frankfurt. Orban scored in just two minutes, putting Hoffenheim ahead, but Frankfurt equalized and the game ended 2–2.

==== Loan to Hellas Verona ====
On 27 August 2025, Orban moved on loan to Hellas Verona in Italy, with an option to buy. A month later, on 20 September, he scored his first goal for the club in a 1–1 draw with Juventus.

On 14 December 2025, Hellas Verona played an important Serie A relegation zone match against Fiorentina at the latter's turf. The match ended 1 - 2 (Hellas won). Orban scored both of Hellas' goals, the second one being scored in the 93rd minute of the match.

==== Loan to Amedspor ====
On 25 July 2026, Orban moved on a new loan to Amedspor in Turkey.

== Personal life ==
Born in Benue State, Nigeria, Orban's mother is from Togo.

== Career statistics ==
=== Club ===
As of match played 8 November 2026

Appearances and goals by club, season and competition
Club	Season	League			National cup (Note: Includes Norwegian Cup, Belgian Cup, Coupe de France, and Coppa Italia)		Europe		Total	
Club	Season	Division	Apps	Goals	Apps	Goals	Apps	Goals	Apps	Goals
Stabæk	2022	Norwegian First Division	22	16	2	3	—		24	19
Gent	2022–23	Belgian Pro League	16	15	—		6 (Note: Appearances in UEFA Conference League)	5	22	20
Gent	2023–24	Belgian Pro League	17	3	3	0	10	9	30	12
Gent	Total		33	18	3	0	16	14	52	32
Lyon	2023–24	Ligue 1	13	1	3	2	—		16	3
Lyon	2024–25	Ligue 1	3	2	0	0	2 (Note: Appearances in UEFA Europa League)	0	5	2
Lyon	Total		16	3	3	4	1	0	21	5
TSG Hoffenheim	2024–25	Bundesliga	13	4	—		0	0	13	4
Hellas Verona (loan)	2025–26	Serie A	28	7	1	0	—		29	7
Amed (loan)	2026–27	Süper Lig	11	10	0	0	—		11	10
Career total			123	58	9	5	18	14	150	77

== Honours ==
Lyon

- Coupe de France runner-up: 2023–24

Individual

- Norwegian First Division Player of the Month: July 2022
- Norwegian First Division Young Player of the Month: September 2022
- Norwegian First Division top scorer: 2022
- Norwegian First Division Young Player of the Year: 2022
