= Chaïm El Djebali =

Tunisian footballer (born 2004)

Personal information
- Full name: Chaïm El Djebali
- Date of birth: 7 February 2004 (age 22)
- Place of birth: Décines-Charpieu, France
- Height: 1.70 m (5 ft 7 in)
- Position: Midfielder

Team information
- Current team: Lyon B
- Number: 33

Youth career
- 2011–2013: Vaulx-en-Velin
- 2013–2015: ES Trinité Lyon
- 2015–2021: Lyon

Senior career*
Years	Team	Apps	(Gls)
2021–	Lyon B	46	(6)
2024–	Lyon	1	(0)

International career^{‡}
2019	France U16	1	(0)
2023	Tunisia U20	9	(1)
2022	Tunisia	1	(0)
- * Club domestic league appearances and goals as of 7 September 2024 ‡ National team caps and goals as of 23:34, 31 May 2023 (UTC)

Chaïm El Djebali (Arabic: شيم الجبالي; born 7 February 2004) is a professional footballer who plays as a midfielder for Ligue 1 club Lyon. Born in France, he plays for the Tunisia national team.

== Early career ==
El Djebali is a youth product of the academies of Vaulx-en-Velin, ES Trinité Lyon, and Lyon. He was promoted to their reserves in 2021, and signed his first professional contract with the club on 30 June 2022, tying him to the club until 2025.

== Club career ==
El Djebali made his professional debut on 26 January 2024, replacing Maxence Caqueret at the 79th minute of a 2–3 home defeat against Rennes in a Ligue 1 game.

== International career ==
El Djebali was born in Décines-Charpieu in the suburbs of Lyon, France, to a Tunisian father and Algerian mother. He holds French, Algerian, and Tunisian nationalities.

He represented the France U16s once in 2019. In September 2022, he accepted a call-up to the senior Tunisia national team for a set of friendlies. He made his debut with Tunisia as a late substitute in a 1–0 friendly win over Comoros on 22 September 2022.

== Career statistics ==
=== Club ===
As of match played 7 September 2024

Appearances and goals by club, season and competition
Club	Season	League			Cup		Continental		Other		Total	
Club	Season	Division	Apps	Goals	Apps	Goals	Apps	Goals	Apps	Goals	Apps	Goals
Lyon II	2021–22	Championnat National 2	2	0	—		—		—		2	0
Lyon II	2022–23	Championnat National 2	19	0	—		—		—		19	0
Lyon II	2023–24	National 3	22	2	—		—		—		22	2
Lyon II	2024–25	National 3	3	4	—		—		—		3	4
Lyon II	Total		46	6	—		—		—		46	6
Lyon	2023–24	Ligue 1	1	0	—		—		—		1	0
Career total			47	6	—		—		—		47	6

=== International ===
As of match played 22 September 2022

Appearances and goals by national team and year
National team	Year	Apps	Goals
Tunisia	2022	1	0
Total		1	0
