= Islam Halifa =

French footballer (born 2005)

Personal information
- Full name: Islamdine Halifa
- Date of birth: 20 December 2004 (age 21)
- Place of birth: Nîmes, France
- Position: Defensive midfielder

Team information
- Current team: Red Star
- Number: 19

Youth career
- 2010–2012: LSM Nîmois
- 2012–2021: Nîmes
- 2021–2024: Lyon

Senior career*
Years	Team	Apps	(Gls)
2022–2024	Lyon B	47	(1)
2024–2025	Lyon	0	(0)
2024–2025	→ RWD Molenbeek (loan)	28	(1)
2025–	Red Star	0	(0)

International career^{‡}
2023	France U20	4	(0)
- * Club domestic league appearances and goals as of 25 May 2025 ‡ National team caps and goals as of 21 November 2023

Islamdine Halifa (born 20 December 2004), commonly known as Islam Halifa, is a French professional footballer who plays as a defensive midfielder for Ligue 2 club Red Star.

== Club career ==
Born in Nîmes, Halifa began his career at LSM Nîmois, before being recruited by Nîmes Olympique in 2012. He remained there for nine years before joining Lyon youth academy. There, he was part of Lyon U18's side that won the 2022 Coupe Gambardella. On 28 August 2023, Halifa signed his first professional contract with Lyon for a duration of four years.

In June 2024, Halifa joined Belgian side RWD Molenbeek on a one-season loan deal. There, he quickly became an important starter of the team in the Challenger Pro League. He was named as the best player of the team in October 2024 by RWD Molenbeek supporters.

On 24 August 2025, Halifa was transferred to Ligue 2 side Red Star.

== Personal life ==
Born in France, Halifa is of Comorian descent.

== Career statistics ==
As of match played 10 May 2025

Appearances and goals by club, season and competition
Club	Season	League			Cup		Europe		Other		Total	
Club	Season	Division	Apps	Goals	Apps	Goals	Apps	Goals	Apps	Goals	Apps	Goals
Lyon B	2021–22	Championnat National 2	3	0	—		—		—		3	0
Lyon B	2022–23	Championnat National 2	21	1	—		—		—		21	1
Lyon B	2023–24	Championnat National 3	23	0	—		—		—		23	0
Lyon B	Total		47	1	—		—		—		47	1
RWD Molenbeek (loan)	2024–25	Challenger Pro League	28	1	2	1	—		2 (Note: Appearances in the Belgian Pro League promotion play-offs)	0	32	2
Career total			76	2	2	1	0	0	2	0	80	3
