= Adryelson =

Brazilian footballer (born 1998)

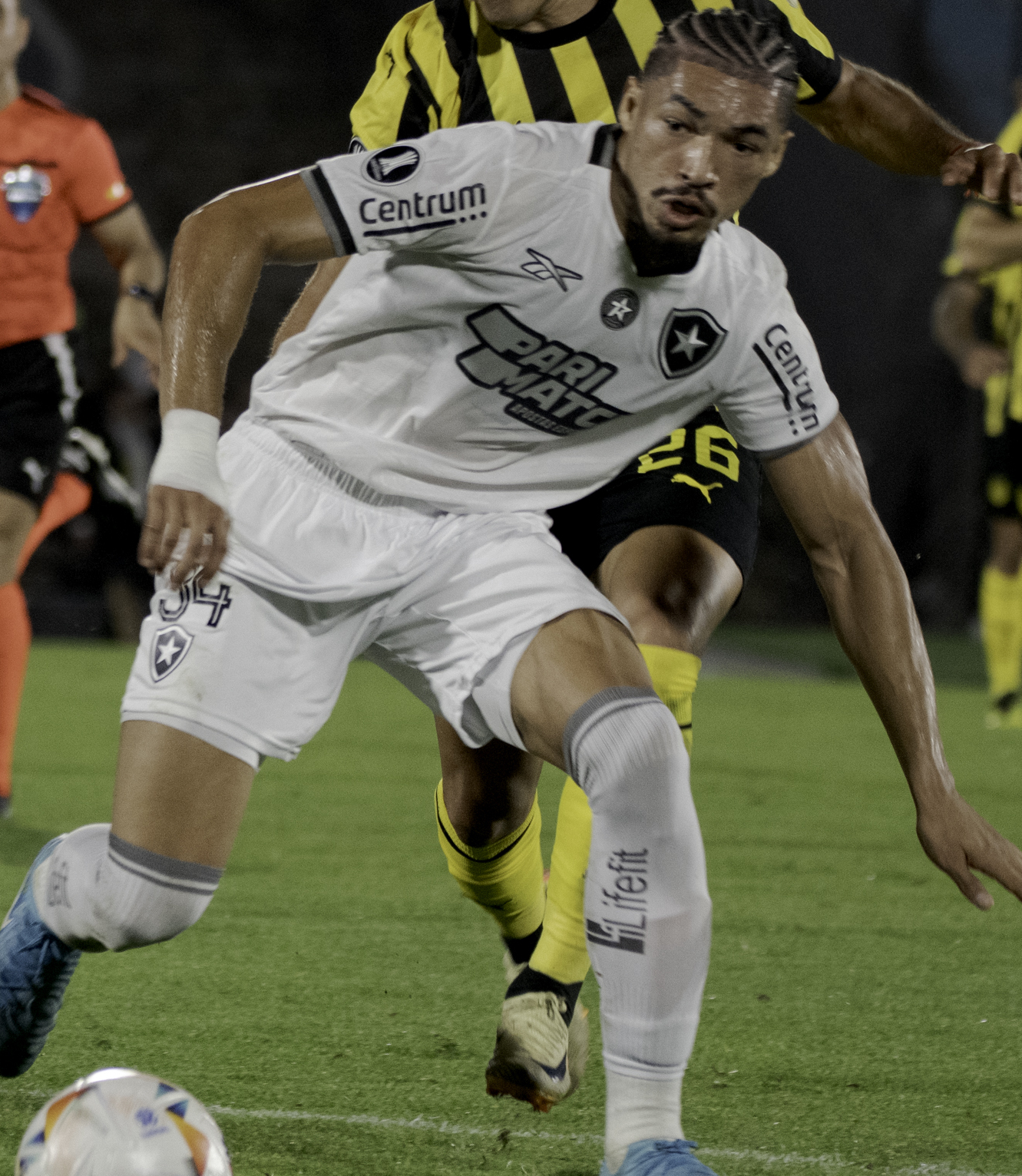
- Adryelson in 2024

Personal information
- Full name: Adryelson Shawann Lima Silva
- Date of birth: 23 March 1998 (age 28)
- Place of birth: Barão de Grajaú, Brazil
- Height: 1.82 m (6 ft 0 in)
- Position: Centre-back

Team information
- Current team: Al-Wasl
- Number: 34

Youth career
- 2011–2018: Sport Recife
- 2017–2018: → Palmeiras (loan)

Senior career*
| Years | Team | Apps | (Gls) |
| 2015–2022 | Sport Recife | 111 | (5) |
| 2021–2022 | → Al-Wasl (loan) | 20 | (1) |
| 2022–2023 | Botafogo | 62 | (1) |
| 2024–2025 | Lyon | 3 | (0) |
| 2024 | → Botafogo (loan) | 7 | (1) |
| 2025 | → Anderlecht (loan) | 10 | (1) |
| 2025– | Al-Wasl | 0 | (0) |

International career^{‡}
| 2015 | Brazil U17 | 2 | (1) |
| 2019 | Brazil U23 | 1 | (0) |
- * Club domestic league appearances and goals as of 12 April 2025 ‡ National team caps and goals as of 20:07, 31 May 2020 (UTC)

Adryelson Shawann Lima Silva (born 23 March 1998), simply known as Adryelson, is a Brazilian professional footballer who plays as a centre-back for UAE Pro League club Al-Wasl.

== Club career ==
=== Sport Recife ===
Born in Barão de Grajaú, Maranhão, Adryelson joined Sport Recife's youth setup in 2011, aged 13. He made his first team debut on 5 April 2015, coming on as a second-half substitute for Henrique Mattos in a 1–1 Campeonato Pernambucano home draw against Santa Cruz.

On 30 June 2017, after another three first team appearances, Adryelson was loaned to Palmeiras until the end of the year, returning to the under-20s. He returned to his parent club the following 30 January, being initially a backup option.

Adryelson made his Série A debut on 5 October 2018, starting and scoring the equalizer in a 2–1 home win against Internacional. The following 7 May, he renewed his contract until December 2021.

On 24 May 2021, after already establishing himself as a regular starter, Adryelson further extended his contract until June 2023, and was loaned to Emirati club Al-Wasl for one year. Upon returning in June 2022, he took a legal action against Sport due to unpaid wages, and was allowed to leave the club for free on 11 July of that year.

=== Botafogo ===
On 22 July 2022, Adryelson joined Botafogo, signing a contract until the end of 2025. In the 2023 season, he played an important role in Botafogo's race for the league title and was named in the 2023 Bola de Prata.

=== Lyon ===
On 5 January 2024, Adryelson signed for Ligue 1 club Lyon on a contract until 30 June 2028. Botafogo received a transfer fee of €3.58 million, in addition to a 50% sell-on clause.

==== Return to Botafogo ====
On 2 September 2024, Botafogo announced the return of Adryelson until the end of 2024. He contributed in Botafogo's historical season as the club won the league title and the 2024 Copa Libertadores. He played a total of 11 games in 3 months, and most notably started in the Copa Libertadores final.

==== Loan to Anderlecht ====
On 15 January 2025, Adryelson was loaned by Anderlecht in Belgium until the end of the 2024–25 season, with an option to buy.

=== Return to Al-Wasl ===
On 16 July 2025, Adryelson returned to UAE Pro League side Al-Wasl for a reported initial fee of €2.2m, a potential €900.000 in add-ons.

== International career ==
Adryelson represented Brazil at the 2015 South American Under-17 Football Championship, and in the 2019 Toulon Tournament.

In October 2023, Adryelson was called up to the Brazil national team for a FIFA World Cup qualifier against Uruguay, replacing the injured Nino.

== Career statistics ==
As of 12 April 2025

Appearances and goals by club, season, and competition
| Club | Season | League | | | State League | | Cup | | Continental | | Other | | Total | |
| Club | Season | Division | Apps | Goals | Apps | Goals | Apps | Goals | Apps | Goals | Apps | Goals | Apps | Goals |
|---|---|---|---|---|---|---|---|---|---|---|---|---|---|---|
| Sport Recife | 2015 | Série A | 0 | 0 | 1 (Note: Appearances in the Campeonato Pernambucano) | 0 | 0 | 0 | — | | — | | 1 | 0 |
| Sport Recife | 2016 | Série A | 0 | 0 | 0 | 0 | 1 (Note: Appearances in the Copa do Brasil) | 0 | — | | — | | 1 | 0 |
| Sport Recife | 2017 | Série A | 0 | 0 | 2 | 0 | 0 | 0 | 0 | 0 | 0 | 0 | 2 | 0 |
| Sport Recife | 2018 | Série A | 11 | 1 | 0 | 0 | 0 | 0 | — | | — | | 11 | 1 |
| Sport Recife | 2019 | Série B | 30 | 0 | 13 | 2 | 1 | 0 | — | | 0 | 0 | 44 | 2 |
| Sport Recife | 2020 | Série A | 36 | 0 | 8 | 0 | 1 | 0 | — | | 9 (Note: Appearances in the Copa do Nordeste) | 0 | 54 | 0 |
| Sport Recife | 2021 | Série A | 0 | 0 | 10 | 2 | 1 | 0 | — | | 5 | 0 | 16 | 2 |
| Sport Recife | Total | | 77 | 1 | 34 | 4 | 4 | 0 | 0 | 0 | 14 | 0 | 129 | 5 |
| Al-Wasl (loan) | 2021–22 | UAE Pro League | 20 | 1 | — | | 0 | 0 | — | | 5 (Note: Appearances in the UAE League Cup) | 1 | 25 | 2 |
| Botafogo | 2022 | Série A | 17 | 0 | — | | — | | — | | — | | 17 | 0 |
| Botafogo | 2023 | Série A | 35 | 1 | 10 (Note: Appearances in the Campeonato Carioca) | 0 | 5 | 2 | 8 (Note: Appearances in the Copa Sudamericana) | 1 | — | | 58 | 4 |
| Botafogo | Total | | 52 | 1 | 10 | 0 | 5 | 2 | 8 | 1 | — | | 75 | 4 |
| Lyon | 2023–24 | Ligue 1 | 2 | 0 | — | | 1 | 0 | — | | — | | 3 | 0 |
| Lyon | 2024–25 | Ligue 1 | 1 | 0 | — | | 0 | 0 | 0 | 0 | — | | 1 | 0 |
| Lyon | Total | | 3 | 0 | — | | 1 | 0 | 0 | 0 | — | | 4 | 0 |
| Botafogo (loan) | 2024 | Série A | 7 | 1 | — | | 0 | 0 | 3 (Note: Appearances in Copa Libertadores) | 0 | 1 (Note: Appearance in FIFA Intercontinental Cup) | 0 | 11 | 1 |
| Anderlecht (loan) | 2024–25 | Belgian Pro League | 10 | 1 | — | | 1 | 0 | 2 (Note: Appearances in UEFA Europa League) | 0 | — | | 13 | 1 |
| Career total | | | 169 | 5 | 44 | 4 | 11 | 2 | 13 | 1 | 20 | 1 | 257 | 13 |

== Honours ==
Sport Recife

- Campeonato Pernambucano: 2017, 2019

Lyon

- Coupe de France runner-up: 2023–24

Botafogo

- Copa Libertadores: 2024
- Campeonato Brasileiro Série A: 2024

Brazil U17

- South American U-17 Championship: 2015

Brazil U23

- Toulon Tournament: 2019
