= Ernest Nuamah =

Ghanaian footballer (born 2003)

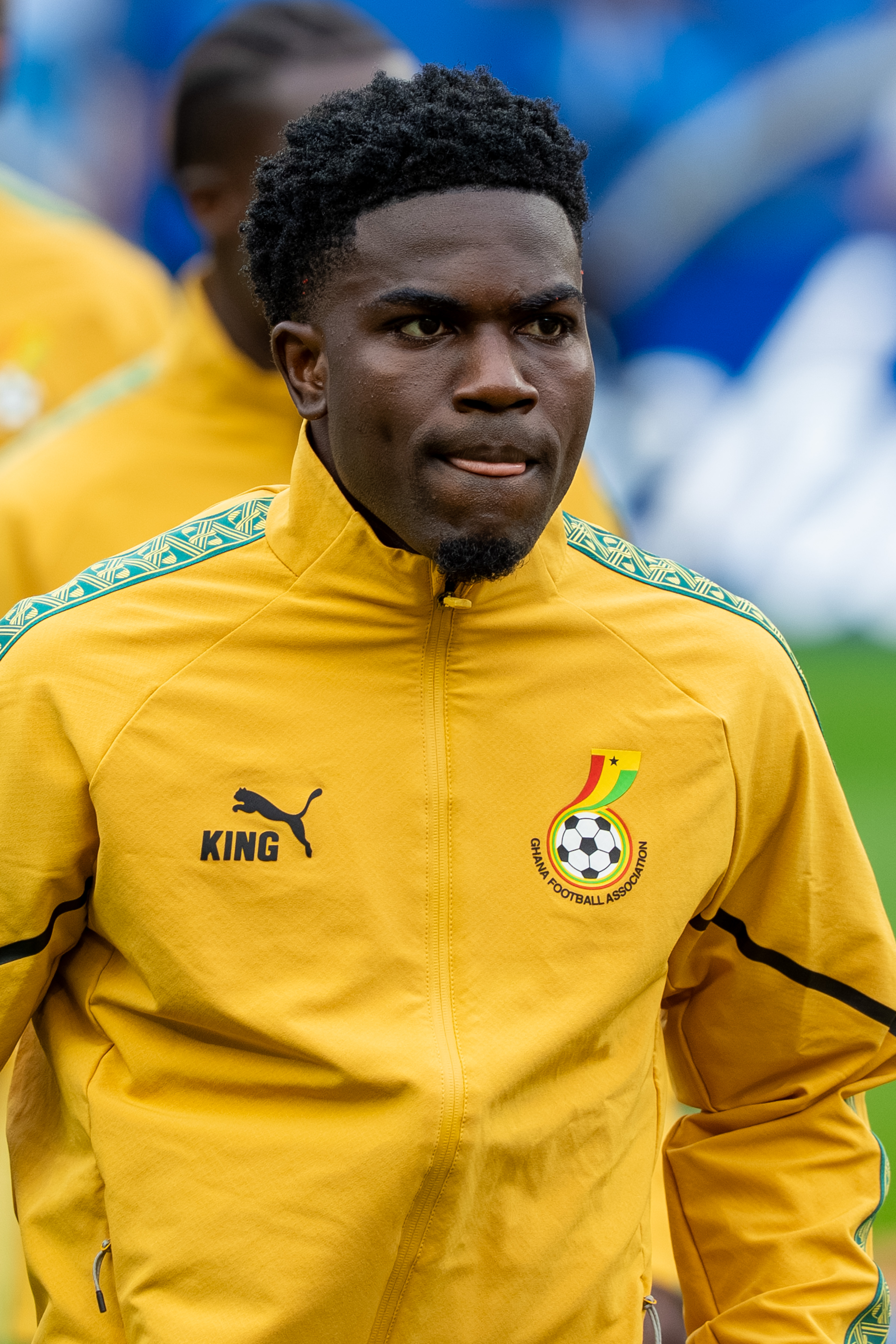
- Nuamah with Ghana in 2026

Personal information
- Full name: Ernest Nuamah Appiah
- Date of birth: 1 November 2003 (age 23)
- Place of birth: Kumasi, Ghana
- Height: 1.78 m (5 ft 10 in)
- Position: Winger

Team information
- Current team: Lyon
- Number: 7

Youth career
- Right to Dream
- 2022: Nordsjælland

Senior career*
Years	Team	Apps	(Gls)
2022–2023	Nordsjælland	43	(17)
2023–2024	RWDM Brussels	0	(0)
2023–2024	→ Lyon (loan)	29	(3)
2024–	Lyon	31	(6)

International career^{‡}
2023–	Ghana U23	3	(1)
2023–	Ghana	24	(5)
- * Club domestic league appearances and goals as of 22:30, 9 October 2025 (UTC) ‡ National team caps and goals as of 22:00, 29 September 2026 (UTC)

Ernest Nuamah Appiah (born 1 November 2003) is a Ghanaian professional footballer who plays as a winger for Ligue 1 club Lyon and the Ghana national team.

== Early career ==
Nuamah was born and raised in Asafo, a suburb of Kumasi. He started his career with Right to Dream Academy, a football academy based in Eastern Region, Ghana.

== Club career ==
=== Nordsjælland ===
In January 2022, Nuamah joined Danish Superliga side FC Nordsjælland. He made his debut on 10 April 2022 when he came on in the 67th minute for Magnus Kofod Andersen to score an 84th-minute goal in a 2–2 draw to Aarhus GF. He was adjudged as the team's man of the match at the end of the match. In September 2022 Nuamah was adjudged the young player of the month.

On 19 March 2023, Nuamah scored a brace including the winning goal in a 2–1 win against Brøndby. He received the award for Danish Superliga Player of the Year at the end of the season.

Nuamah started the 2023–24 season off strong, scoring a hat-trick in a 4–1 league victory against Viborg on 24 July 2023, the first matchday of the new campaign.

=== RWDM Brussels and loan to Lyon ===
On 30 August 2023, Nuamah joined Belgian side RWDM Brussels, before being immediately loaned to French side Lyon for the rest of the season, with a purchase option worth €25 million, plus €4.5 million in potential add-ons, in favor of the Ligue 1 club. The loan move was made possible through a common ownership between the two clubs, John Textor's Eagle Football Holdings, and was necessary to avoid Lyon's spending restrictions given by the Direction Nationale du Contrôle de Gestion (DNCG). In the process, Nuamah set a new record as Nordsjælland's highest-grossing sale.

Later that year, on 8 October, he scored his first goal for Lyon in a 3–3 draw against Lorient.

=== Lyon ===
On 7 July 2024, Lyon announced the permanent transfer of Nuamah from RWD Molenbeek for a reported fee of €28.5 million.

In the final days of the 2024 summer transfer window, a €19 million transfer of Nuamah to Premier League club Fulham fell through at the last minute. Despite an agreement and a medical examination, Nuamah broke down into tears thought to be tears of joy but instead he disappeared during the final stages of the deal, reportedly due to his reluctance to leave Lyon. Later, Lyon's owner John Textor apologized for the situation that led to Nuamah feeling forced out of the club.

On April 6, 2025, during Ligue 1 matchday 28 against LOSC, Ernest Nuamah was forced off the pitch in the 7th minute with a knee injury sustained in a duel with Gabriel Gudmundsson. Two days later, OL announced that Nuamah had suffered a rupture of the anterior cruciate ligament in his left knee, ruling him out for the remainder of the season.

== International career ==
On November 4, 2022, Nuamah was included by Otto Addo, the head coach of the Ghana national team, in a provisional 55-man squad for the 2022 FIFA World Cup. However, he was not included in the final squad for the tournament.

On December 31, 2023, he was selected in Chris Hughton's 27-man squad representing Ghana for the 2023 Africa Cup of Nations.

Nuamah scored his first international goal on September 7, 2023, against the Central African Republic. Coming on as a substitute for Osman Bukari, he scored the winning goal late in the match, with the final score ending 2–1.

On June 2, 2026, Nuamah was integrated by Ghana's coach Carlos Queiroz into his list of 26 players in order to compete in the 2026 FIFA World Cup.

== Career statistics ==
=== Club ===
As of match played 15 October 2026

Appearances and goals by club, season and competition
Club	Season	League			National cup (Note: Includes Danish Cup, Coupe de France)		Europe		Total	
Club	Season	Division	Apps	Goals	Apps	Goals	Apps	Goals	Apps	Goals
Nordsjælland	2021–22	Danish Superliga	9	1	0	0	—		9	1
Nordsjælland	2022–23	Danish Superliga	30	12	4	3	—		34	15
Nordsjælland	2023–24	Danish Superliga	4	4	0	0	2 (Note: Appearances in UEFA Europa Conference League)	0	6	4
Nordsjælland	Total		43	17	4	3	2	0	49	20
Lyon (loan)	2023–24	Ligue 1	29	3	4	0	—		33	3
Lyon	2024–25	Ligue 1	23	3	0	0	9 (Note: Appearances in UEFA Europa League)	3	32	6
Lyon	2025–26	Ligue 1	3	0	0	0	0	0	3	0
Lyon	2026–27	Ligue 1	5	3	0	0	5 (Note: Four appearances and one goal in UEFA Champions League, one appearance and one goal in UEFA Europa League)	2	10	5
Lyon	Lyon total		60	9	4	0	14	5	78	14
Career total			103	26	8	3	16	5	127	34

=== International ===
As of matches played 29 September 2026

Appearances and goals by national team and year
National team	Year	Apps	Goals
Ghana	2023	7	2
Ghana	2024	9	1
Ghana	2025	2	1
Ghana	2026	6	1
Total		24	5

Scores and results list Ghana's goal tally first, score column indicates score after each Nuamah goal.

List of international goals scored by Ernest Nuamah
No.	Date	Venue	Opponent	Score	Result	Competition
1	7 September 2023	Baba Yara Stadium, Kumasi, Ghana	Central African Republic	2–1	2–1	2023 Africa Cup of Nations qualification
2	12 September 2023	Accra Sports Stadium, Accra, Ghana	Liberia	1–0	3–1	Friendly
3	6 June 2024	26 March Stadium, Bamako, Mali	Mali	1–1	2–1	2026 FIFA World Cup qualification
4	21 March 2025	Accra Sports Stadium, Accra, Ghana	Chad	5–0	5–0	2026 FIFA World Cup qualification
5	29 September 2026	Accra Sports Stadium, Accra, Ghana	Gambia	1–0	2–4	2027 Africa Cup of Nations qualification

== Honours ==
Lyon

- Coupe de France runner-up: 2023–24

Individual

- Danish Superliga Player of the Year: 2022–23
- Danish Superliga Player of the Spring: 2022–23
- Danish Superliga Young Player of the Year: 2022–23
- Danish Superliga Player of the Month: July 2023
- Danish Superliga Young Player of the Month: September 2022, July 2023
- Danish Superliga Team of the Month: July 2023
- Odartey Lamptey Future Star Award: 2023
