= Jake O'Brien (footballer) =

Irish footballer (born 2001)

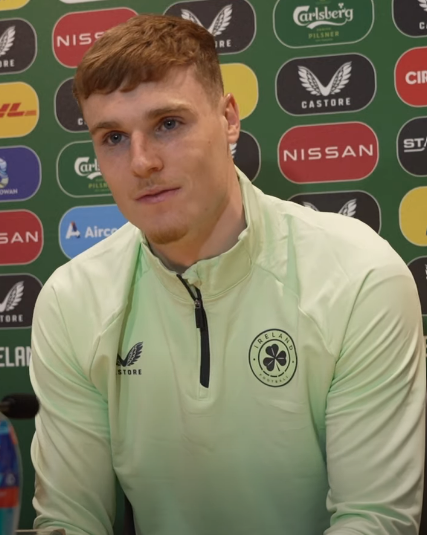
- O'Brien in 2024

Personal information
- Full name: Jake Patrick O'Brien
- Date of birth: 15 May 2001 (age 25)
- Place of birth: County Cork, Ireland
- Height: 1.97 m (6 ft 6 in)
- Position: Centre-back

Team information
- Current team: Everton
- Number: 15

Youth career
- 2010–2013: Youghal United
- 2013–2018: Lakewood Athletic
- 2018–2019: Cork City

Senior career*
Years	Team	Apps	(Gls)
2019–2021	Cork City	9	(0)
2021	→ Crystal Palace (loan)	0	(0)
2021–2023	Crystal Palace	0	(0)
2022	→ Swindon Town (loan)	19	(0)
2022–2023	→ RWD Molenbeek (loan)	30	(3)
2023–2024	Lyon	27	(4)
2024–	Everton	63	(3)

International career^{‡}
2021–2022	Republic of Ireland U21	11	(0)
2024–	Republic of Ireland	23	(0)
- * Club domestic league appearances and goals as of 13:00, 8 November 2026 (UTC) ‡ National team caps and goals as of 23:18, 17 November 2026 (UTC)

Jake Patrick O'Brien (born 15 May 2001) is an Irish professional footballer who plays as a centre-back for Premier League club Everton and the Republic of Ireland national team.

O'Brien began his career at Cork City, moving on loan to English club Crystal Palace before the move was made permanent. He spent loan spells at Swindon Town and Belgian club RWD Molenbeek, before moving to French club Lyon in 2023. After one season he returned to England, signing for Everton.

He represented Ireland at under-21 level, before making his senior team debut in 2024.

== Early life ==
Born in County Cork, O'Brien grew up in Youghal, and in his youth also boxed and played hurling, winning national championships in both at Under-14s level. He excelled at football as a youth, captaining Youghal United to underage honours, also captaining Cork to the 2013 SFAI Under-12 Inter-League Cup. At age 16, O'Brien was diagnosed with type 1 diabetes, and later served as an ambassador of Diabetes Ireland.

== Club career ==
O'Brien played for Cork City before moving on loan to English club Crystal Palace in February 2021, with the move made permanent in August 2021. He appeared for the Under-23 team at Palace, including in the EFL Trophy. He moved on loan to Swindon Town in January 2022, playing a total of 21 games.

In August 2022, O'Brien was loaned to Belgian club RWD Molenbeek, along with teammate Luke Plange, for the 2022–23 season. RWD Molenbeek qualified for the 2022-23 Challenger Pro League promotion play-offs in his first season with the club, holding a one-point lead over Beveren with two games remaining. O'Brien won the first trophy of his career as Molenbeek clinched the division.

In August 2023 he signed for French club Lyon, making his Ligue 1 debut on 1 October 2023. In doing so he became the first Irishman since Tony Cascarino in 2000 to play in Ligue 1. On 25 May 2024, he scored in the 2024 Coupe de France final as his side were defeated 2–1 by PSG.

In July 2024, after one season in France, O'Brien returned to England, signing a four-year contract with Premier League club Everton. On 26 February 2026, he scored his first goal for Everton in a 1–1 draw with Brentford.

== International career ==
O'Brien has represented the Republic of Ireland at under-21 level, making 11 appearances between 2021 and 2022. His first call-up to the senior Republic of Ireland squad came in March 2024, ahead of their friendly games against Belgium and Switzerland. On 4 June 2024, O'Brien debuted in a friendly match against Hungary.

== Career statistics ==
=== Club ===
As of match played 6 November 2026

Appearances and goals by club, season and competition
Club	Season	League			National cup (Note: Includes FAI Cup, FA Cup, Belgian Cup, Coupe de France)		League cup (Note: Includes League of Ireland Cup, EFL Cup)		Other		Total	
Club	Season	Division	Apps	Goals	Apps	Goals	Apps	Goals	Apps	Goals	Apps	Goals
Cork City	2019	LOI Premier Division	1	0	0	0	0	0	0	0	1	0
Cork City	2020	LOI Premier Division	8	0	1	0	—		3 (Note: Appearances in Munster Senior Cup)	0	12	0
Cork City	2021	LOI First Division	0	0	0	0	—		0	0	0	0
Cork City	Total		9	0	1	0	0	0	3	0	13	0
Crystal Palace (loan)	2020–21	Premier League	0	0	0	0	0	0	—		0	0
Crystal Palace U21	2021–22	—			—		—		1 (Note: Appearance in EFL Trophy)	0	1	0
Crystal Palace	2021–22	Premier League	0	0	0	0	0	0	—		0	0
Crystal Palace	2022–23	Premier League	0	0	0	0	0	0	—		0	0
Crystal Palace	Total		0	0	0	0	0	0	0	0	0	0
Swindon Town (loan)	2021–22	League Two	19	0	0	0	—		2 (Note: Appearances in League Two play-offs)	0	21	0
RWD Molenbeek (loan)	2022–23	Challenger Pro League	30	3	1	0	—		—		31	3
Lyon	2023–24	Ligue 1	27	4	5	1	—		—		32	5
Everton	2024–25	Premier League	20	2	2	0	2	0	—		24	2
Everton	2025–26	Premier League	37	1	1	0	2	0	—		40	1
Everton	2026–27	Premier League	6	0	0	0	2	0	—		8	0
Everton	Total		63	3	3	0	6	0	0	0	72	3
Career total			148	10	10	1	6	0	6	0	170	11

=== International ===
As of match played 17 November 2026

Appearances and goals by national team and year
National team	Year	Apps	Goals
Republic of Ireland
Republic of Ireland	2024	3	0
Republic of Ireland	2025	10	0
Republic of Ireland	2026	10	0
Total		23	0

== Honours ==
RWD Molenbeek

- Challenger Pro League: 2022–23

Lyon

- Coupe de France runner-up: 2023–24
