= Achraf Laâziri =

Moroccan footballer (born 2003)

Personal information
- Date of birth: 8 July 2003 (age 23)
- Place of birth: Hay Hassani, Casablanca, Morocco
- Height: 1.77 m (5 ft 9 1/2 in)
- Position: Left-back

Team information
- Current team: IR Tangier
- Number: 15

Youth career
- 2017–2022: FUS Rabat

Senior career*
Years	Team	Apps	(Gls)
2022	FUS Rabat	2	(0)
2022–2025	Lyon II	22	(0)
2023–2026	Lyon	0	(0)
2023–2024	→ Dunkerque (loan)	14	(0)
2024–2025	→ RWDM (loan)	27	(1)
2026–	IR Tangier	0	(0)

International career^{‡}
2023	Morocco U20	3	(0)
2023–2024	Morocco U23	3	(0)
- * Club domestic league appearances and goals as of 17 May 2026 ‡ National team caps and goals as of 26 March 2024

Achraf Laâziri (Arabic: أشرف العزيري; born 8 July 2003) is a Moroccan professional footballer who plays as a left-back for IR Tangier.

== Playing career ==
Laâziri joined the youth academy of FUS Rabat in 2017, and made his senior debut with them in the Botola in 2022. On 5 May 2022, he moved to Lyon on a 4-year contract and was originally assigned to their reserves. On 14 February 2023, he extended his contract with Lyon until 2027. On 16 November 2023, he joined Ligue 2 club Dunkerque on loan for the remainder of the 2023–24 season.

== International career ==
Laâziri was part of the Morocco U23s that played at the 2023 Maurice Revello Tournament.

== Career statistics ==
As of match played 16 December 2023

Appearances and goals by club, season and competition
Club	Season	League			Cup		Continental		Other		Total	
Club	Season	Division	Apps	Goals	Apps	Goals	Apps	Goals	Apps	Goals	Apps	Goals
FUS Rabat	2021–22	Botola	2	0	—		—		—		2	0
Lyon II	2022–23	Championnat National 2	12	0	—		—		—		12	0
Lyon II	2023–24	Championnat National 3	6	0	—		—		—		6	0
Lyon II	Total		18	0	—		—		—		18	0
Lyon	2022–23	Ligue 1	0	0	0	0	—		—		0	0
Dunkerque (loan)	2023–24	Ligue 2	4	0	2	0	—		—		6	0
Career total			24	0	2	0	0	0	0	0	26	0
