= Erawan Garnier =

Thai footballer (born 2006)

Personal information
- Full name: Erawan Gerard Fongsri Garnier
- Date of birth: 5 January 2006 (age 20)
- Place of birth: Écully, France
- Height: 1.82 m (6 ft 0 in)
- Position: Winger

Team information
- Current team: Bastia
- Number: 23

Youth career
- 2016–2019: Savigny
- 2019–2024: Lyon

Senior career*
Years	Team	Apps	(Gls)
2024–2025	Lyon B	23	(1)
2025–2026	Lens	1	(0)
2026–	Bastia	9	(2)

International career^{‡}
2024–	Thailand U23	5	(0)
2026–	Thailand	1	(0)
- * Club domestic league appearances and goals as of 01:11, 8 September 2026 (UTC) ‡ National team caps and goals as of 15:17, 5 June 2026 (UTC)

Erawan Gerard Fongsri Garnier (Thai: เอราวัณ การ์นิเย่; born 5 January 2006) is a footballer who plays as a winger for Ligue 3 club Bastia. Born in France, he plays for the Thailand national team.

== Club career ==
Garnier was born in Écully in the Metropolis of Lyon to a French father and a Thai mother. He started his youth career playing for local team Savigny. In 2019, he joined the Lyon youth academy.

After good performances with Lyon under-19s, Garnier was promoted to Lyon's reserve team in January 2024, playing in the Championnat National 3.

On 24 October 2025, after missing out the first part of the season with Lyon due to injury, Garnier was transferred to Lens and signed his first professional contract with the team.

Garnier made his league debut for Lens as an 83rd-minute substitute on 14 March 2026 in a 1–2 away loss against Lorient. He is the first Thai to play in Ligue 1.

== International career ==
In March 2024, Garnier was called up to the Thailand U20 training camp in Buriram.

In April 2024, Garnier was selected to Thailand U23's squad for the 2024 AFC U-23 Asian Cup, being the youngest member of the team. In the first group stage match against Iraq, he assisted the first goal of Thailand, contributing in their 2–0 victory. Thailand later lost their two following matches and exit the tournament from the group stage.

In May 2026, Garnier received his first call-up to the Thailand national football team after head coach Anthony Hudson named him in a 23-man squad for friendly matches against Kuwait and China during the June FIFA Day window.

== Playing style ==
Garnier was primary used as a full-back in Lyon youth team as he can play on either flank due to his ability to use both feet. With Lyon's reserve team, to utilize his good dribbling and crossing ability, he was deployed by coaches in a more offensive role as a winger.

== Career statistics ==
As of match played 14 March 2026

Appearances and goals by club, season and competition
Club	Season	League			Cup		Other		Total	
Club	Season	Division	Apps	Goals	Apps	Goals	Apps	Goals	Apps	Goals
Lyon B	2023–24	Championnat National 3	8	1	—				8	1
Lyon B	2024–25	Championnat National 3	14	0	—		4 (Note: Appearance(s) in Premier League International Cup)	0	18	0
Lyon B	2025–26	Championnat National 3	1	0	—				1	0
Lyon B	Total		23	1	—		4	0	27	1
Lens	2025–26	Ligue 1	1	0	0	0	—		1	0
Career total			24	1	0	0	4	0	28	1

== Honours ==
Lens

- Coupe de France: 2025–26
