= Mathieu Patouillet =

French footballer (born 2004)

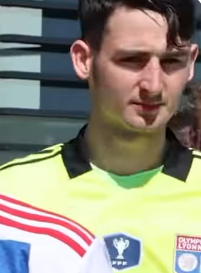
- Patouillet in 2022

Personal information
- Full name: Mathieu Frank Patouillet
- Date of birth: 20 February 2004 (age 22)
- Place of birth: Lyon, France
- Height: 1.88 m (6 ft 2 in)
- Position: Goalkeeper

Team information
- Current team: Brest
- Number: 30

Youth career
- 2010–2012: AS Chessy-les-Mines
- 2012–2018: Sud Azergues Foot
- 2018–2019: Domtac FC
- 2019–2022: Lyon

Senior career*
Years	Team	Apps	(Gls)
2022–2023	Lyon B	17	(0)
2023–2025	Lyon	0	(0)
2023–2025	→ Sochaux (loan)	55	(0)
2025–2026	Al Hilal	0	(0)
2026–	Brest	0	(0)

International career^{‡}
2022	France U18	2	(0)
2022–2023	France U19	3	(0)
2023–2024	France U20	7	(0)
2026–	France U21	3	(0)
Medal record
Men's football
Representing France
Mediterranean Games
Gold medal – first place	2022 Oran	Team
- * Club domestic league appearances and goals as of 5 September 2026 ‡ National team caps and goals as of 17 November 2026

Mathieu Frank Patouillet (born 20 February 2004) is a French professional footballer who plays as a goalkeeper for Ligue 1 club Brest.

== Early career ==
As a native of Lyon, Patouillet joined the youth academy of city giant Olympique Lyonnais in 2019.

Patouillet took part in Lyon's 2021–22 Coupe Gambardella's successful campaign. In the final at the Stade de France, after a 1–1 draw in regular time, he saved the decisive penalty, helping where Lyon defeat Caen 5–4 in a penalty shootout.

== Club career ==
On 10 May 2023, Patouillet signed his first professional contract with Lyon.

On 1 September 2023, he joined Championnat National side Sochaux in a one-season loan deal. He made his debut against Villefranche in a 3–3 draw and saved a penalty from Maxime Blanc. On 20 January 2024, he stopped the decisive penalty against Reims to qualify Sochaux to the Round of 16 of the Coupe de France.

On 8 September 2025, Patouillet was transferred to Saudi Pro League team Al-Hilal for a reported fee of €342,000 and signed a two-year contract with the club. He was limited to two AFC Champions League Elite appearances for the club in the 2025–26 season.

On 26 August 2026, Patouillet returned to France and signed a three-season deal with Brest.

== International career ==
Patouillet represented France in several youth categories. He was part of the France U18 team that won the gold medal at the 2022 Mediterranean Games, featuring in two matches.

In June 2024, he took part in the Maurice Revello Tournament with France under-20s.

== Honours ==
Lyon Youth

- Coupe Gambardella: 2021–22

France U18

- Mediterranean Games Gold medal: (gold) 2022
