= 2026–27 Olympique Lyonnais season =

Olympique Lyonnais
2026–27 season
- President: Michele Kang
- Head coach: Paulo Fonseca (until 4 November); Jorge Maciel (caretaker, from 4 November)
- Stadium: Parc Olympique Lyonnais
- Ligue 1: 3rd
- Coupe de France: Round of 64
- UEFA Champions League: Play-off round
- UEFA Europa League: League phase
- Top goalscorer: League: Ernest Nuamah (4); All: Ernest Nuamah (6)
- Highest home attendance: 55,443 vs Fenerbahçe (26 August 2026)
- Lowest home attendance: 36,278 vs Auxerre (4 September 2026)
- Average home league attendance: 40,650 (68.7% of capacity)
- Biggest win: Lyon 4–0 Rennes (19 September 2026)
- Biggest defeat: TSG Hoffenheim 3–0 Lyon (22 October 2026)
Home colours	Away colours	Third colours

The 2026–27 season is the 77th season in the history of Olympique Lyonnais, and their 38th consecutive season in the French top flight. In addition to the domestic league, the club is participating in this season's editions of the Coupe de France, the UEFA Champions League and the UEFA Europa League.

== Players ==
=== Squad information ===
Players and squad numbers last updated on 3 July 2026.
Note: Flags indicate national team as has been defined under FIFA eligibility rules. Players may hold more than one non-FIFA nationality.

No.	Player	Nat.	Position(s)	Date of birth (age)	Contract ends	Transfer fee	Signed from
Goalkeepers
1	Dominik Greif	(Slovakia)	GK	6 April 1997 (age 29)	2029	€4M	(Spain) Mallorca
25	Justin Bengui	(France)	GK	9 July 2005 (age 21)	2028	N/A	(France) Youth Sector
40	Rémy Descamps	(France)	GK	25 June 1996 (age 30)	2027	Free	(France) Nantes
50	Lassine Diarra	(Mali)	GK	11 November 2002 (age 24)	2027	Free	(France) Châteauroux
Defenders
3	Nicolás Tagliafico	(Argentina)	LB	21 August 1992 (age 34)	2027	€4.2M	(Netherlands) Ajax
13	Zachary Athekame	(Switzerland)	RB	13 December 2004 (age 21)	2027	Loan	(Italy) Milan
16	Abner	(Brazil)	LB	27 May 2000 (age 26)	2029	€8M	(Spain) Real Betis
19	Moussa Niakhaté	(Senegal)	CB	8 March 1996 (age 30)	2028	€31.9M	(England) Nottingham Forest
20	Felix Bacher	(Austria)	CB	25 October 2000 (age 26)	2031	€4.3M	(Portugal) Estoril
21	Ruben Kluivert	(Netherlands)	CB	21 May 2001 (age 25)	2030	€3.78M	(Portugal) Casa Pia
22	Clinton Mata	(Angola)	CB / RB	7 November 1992 (age 34)	2028	€5M	(Belgium) Club Brugge
76	Mohamed Ouédraogo	(Burkina Faso)	LB	7 January 2003 (age 23)	2031	€2.2M	(Austria) Rheindorf Altach
85	Noham Kamara	(France)	CB / RB	27 January 2007 (age 19)	2030	€4.1M	(France) Paris Saint-Germain
Midfielders
2	Mads Bidstrup	(Denmark)	DM / CM	25 February 2001 (age 25)	2031	€10.5M	(Austria) Red Bull Salzburg
6	Tanner Tessmann	(United States)	DM / CM	24 September 2001 (age 25)	2029	€6M	(Italy) Venezia
8	Corentin Tolisso	(France)	CM / AM	3 August 1994 (age 32)	2029	Free	(Germany) Bayern Munich
10	Pavel Šulc	(Czech Republic)	AM / CF	29 December 2000 (age 25)	2029	€7.5M	(Czech Republic) Viktoria Plzeň
18	Khalis Merah	(France)	CM / AM	24 February 2007 (age 19)	2029	N/A	(France) Youth Sector
23	Tyler Morton	(England)	DM / CM	31 October 2002 (age 24)	2030	€10M	(England) Liverpool
99	Noah Nartey	(Denmark)	CM / AM	5 October 2005 (age 21)	2030	€7.5M	(Denmark) Brøndby
Forwards
7	Ernest Nuamah	(Ghana)	RW / LW	1 November 2003 (age 23)	2028	€28.5M	(Belgium) RWDM Brussels
11	Keito Nakamura	(Japan)	LW	28 July 2000 (age 26)	2030	€1M + €19M maximum bonus	(France) Reims
17	Loïs Openda	(Belgium)	CF	16 February 2000 (age 26)	2027	Loan (€3.5M)	(Italy) Juventus
24	Julien Duranville	(Belgium)	LW / RW	5 May 2006 (age 20)	2031	€5M	(Germany) Borussia Dortmund
26	Kaïl Boudache	(Algeria)	RW / AM	15 June 2006 (age 20)	2031	Free	(France) Nice
32	Alejandro Gomes Rodríguez	(England)	CF / LW	11 March 2008 (age 18)	2027	N/A	(France) Youth Sector
45	Rémi Himbert	(France)	LW / CF	29 February 2008 (age 18)	2028	N/A	(France) Youth Sector
Left during the season
11	Malick Fofana	(Belgium)	LW / RW	31 March 2005 (age 21)	2028	€17M	(Belgium) Gent
39	Mathys De Carvalho	(Portugal)	DM / CM	1 May 2005 (age 21)	2028	N/A	(France) Youth Sector
98	Ainsley Maitland-Niles	(England)	RB / RW	29 August 1997 (age 29)	2027	Free	(England) Arsenal

=== Players from Olympique Lyonnais Reserves and Academy ===
Note: Flags indicate national team as defined under FIFA eligibility rules; some limited exceptions apply. Players may hold more than one non-FIFA nationality.

No.	Pos.	Nation	Player
4	MF	CIV	Paul Akouokou
30	GK	CIV	Yvann Konan
34	MF	SEN	Fallou Fall
35	GK	POR	Matthias Da Silva

No.	Pos.	Nation	Player
37	DF	FRA	Steeve Kango
41	DF	FRA	Melvyn Otobo
44	FW	FRA	Adil Hamdani
46	MF	POR	Tiago Gonçalves

=== Out on loan ===
Note: Flags indicate national team as defined under FIFA eligibility rules; some limited exceptions apply. Players may hold more than one non-FIFA nationality.

No.	Pos.	Nation	Player
—	GK	USA	Matt Turner (at (United States) New England Revolution until 30 June 2027)
—	MF	FRA	Mahamadou Diawara (at Red Star until 30 June 2027)
—	MF	BEL	Orel Mangala (at (Spain) Getafe until 30 June 2027)

No.	Pos.	Nation	Player
—	FW	ALG	Daryll Benlahlou (at Montpellier until 30 June 2027)
—	FW	FRA	Enzo Molebe (at (Switzerland) Lausanne-Sport until 30 June 2027)

== Transfers ==
=== In ===
No.	Pos.	Player	Transferred from	Fee	Date	Source
Summer
	GK	(France) Justin Bengui	(Belgium) RWDM Brussels	Loan returm	1 July 2026	
	DF	(France) Yacine Chaïb	(Belgium) RWDM Brussels	Loan return	1 July 2026	
4	MF	(Ivory Coast) Paul Akouokou	(Spain) Zaragoza	Loan return	1 July 2026	
	MF	(Senegal) Pierre Dorival	(France) Stade Briochin	Loan return	1 July 2026	
29	FW	(France) Enzo Molebe	(France) Montpellier	Loan return	1 July 2026	
32	FW	(England) Alejandro Gomes Rodríguez	(France) Annecy	Loan return	1 July 2026	
34	MF	(France) Mahamadou Diawara	(Belgium) Antwerp	Loan return	1 July 2026	
55	DF	(Croatia) Duje Ćaleta-Car	(Spain) Real Sociedad	Loan return	1 July 2026	
	GK	(United States) Matt Turner	(United States) New England Revolution	Loan return	1 July 2026	
85	DF	(France) Noham Kamara	(France) Paris Saint-Germain	€4.1M	1 July 2026	
26	MF	(Algeria) Kaïl Boudache	(France) Nice	€5M	1 July 2026	
2	MF	(Denmark) Mads Bidstrup	(Austria) Red Bull Salzburg	€10.5M	1 July 2026	
24	FW	(Belgium) Julien Duranville	(Germany) Borussia Dortmund	€5M	2 July 2026	
76	DF	(Burkina Faso) Mohamed Ouédraogo	(Austria) Rheindorf Altach	€2.2M	3 July 2026	
17	FW	(Belgium) Loïs Openda	(Italy) Juventus	€3.5M (Loan)	28 July 2026	
20	DF	(Austria) Felix Bacher	(Portugal) Estoril	€4.3M	2 August 2026	
13	DF	(Switzerland) Zachary Athekame	(Italy) Milan	Loan	14 August 2026	
11	FW	(Japan) Keito Nakamura	(France) Reims	€1M + €19M bonus	2 September 2026	
Winter

=== Out ===
No.	Pos.	Player	Transferred to	Fee	Date	Source
Summer
7	MF	(Czech Republic) Adam Karabec	(Czech Republic) Sparta Prague	End of loan	1 July 2026	
9	FW	(Brazil) Endrick	(Spain) Real Madrid	End of loan	1 July 2026	
33	DF	(Netherlands) Hans Hateboer	(France) Rennes	End of loan	1 July 2026	
77	FW	(Ukraine) Roman Yaremchuk	(Greece) Olympiacos	End of loan	1 July 2026	
18	FW	(Algeria) Rachid Ghezzal	TBD	End of contract	1 July 2026	
20	FW	(Uruguay) Martín Satriano	(Spain) Getafe	€6M	1 July 2026	
17	FW	(Portugal) Afonso Moreira	(Germany) Bayer Leverkusen	€33.6M	1 July 2026	
67	DF	(Democratic Republic of the Congo) Prince Mbatshi	(Czech Republic) Zlín	Free	1 July 2026	
	MF	(France) Kenan Doganay	(Germany) Bayer Leverkusen	€0.26M	10 July 2026	
	GK	(United States) Matt Turner	(United States) New England Revolution	Loan	13 July 2026	
	FW	(Algeria) Daryll Benlahlou	(France) Montpellier	Loan	24 July 2026	
5	MF	(Belgium) Orel Mangala	(Spain) Getafe	Loan	7 August 2026	
29	FW	(France) Enzo Molebe	(Switzerland) Lausanne-Sport	Loan	11 August 2026	
35	DF	(France) Yacine Chaïb	(Algeria) MC Alger	Free	24 August 2026	
55	DF	(Croatia) Duje Ćaleta-Car	(Italy) Sassuolo	Free	1 September 2026	
	FW	(France) Yannis Lagha	(Algeria) JS Kabylie	Free	1 September 2026	
	MF	(France) Mahamadou Diawara	(France) Red Star	Loan	1 September 2026	
98	DF	(England) Ainsley Maitland-Niles	(England) Everton	€3.5M	1 September 2026	
11	FW	(Belgium) Malick Fofana	(England) Sunderland	€35M	1 September 2026	
33	MF	(Senegal) Fallou Fall	(France) Bastia	Free	9 October 2026	
Winter

== Pre-season and friendlies ==
Win Draw Loss Fixtures

Lyon started the pre-season campaign on 29 June 2026 in the club's training ground in Décines-Charpieu.

8 July 2026 Friendly	Lyon	5–2	Mâcon 71	Décines-Charpieu, France
10:30 CEST (UTC+2)	Hamdani 6'; Himbert (yellow card) 49', (goal) 70', 74' (pen.), 81'; Molebe 87'	Report	Abner 77' (o.g.); Rachidi 90+1'	Stadium: Stade Gérard Houllier; Attendance: 0

11 July 2026 Friendly	Lyon	6–3	St. Gallen	Décines-Charpieu, France
10:30 CEST (UTC+2)	Himbert 9', 19', 38'; Hamdani 14'; Gomes Rodríguez 78'; Molebe 82'	Report	Witzig 15'; Stevanović 45+1'; Görtler 51', (red card) 67'	Stadium: Stade Gérard Houllier; Attendance: 0

15 July 2026 Friendly	Lyon	2–1	Servette	Bourgoin-Jallieu, France
18:30 CEST (UTC+2)	Tolisso 37', 60' (pen.)	Report	Kadile 3'	Stadium: Stade Pierre Rajon; Attendance: 4,000

18 July 2026 Friendly	Lyon	0–2	Slavia Prague	Herzogenaurach, Germany
19:00 CEST (UTC+2)		Report	Isife 96'; Ouanda 117'	Stadium: Campus Adidas; Attendance: 0

24 July 2026 Friendly	VfL Wolfsburg	0–2	Lyon	Bamberg, Germany
14:00 CEST (UTC+2)	Gerhardt (red card) 60+5'	Report	Maitland-Niles 67'; Gomes Rodríguez 94'	Stadium: Fuchs-Park-Stadion; Attendance: 1,189

29 July 2026 Friendly	Real Betis	4–0	Lyon	La Línea de la Concepción, Spain
18:00 CEST (UTC+2)	Bartra 22'; Deossa 44'; García 59'; Riquelme 78'	Report		Stadium: Estadio Municipal de La Línea de la Concepción; Attendance: TBC; Referee: Abraham Gutiérrez Perera

== Competitions ==
=== Overall record ===
Competition	First match	Last match	Starting round	Final position	Record							
Competition	First match	Last match	Starting round	Final position	Pld	W	D	L	GF	GA	GD	Win %
Ligue 1	22 August 2026	29 May 2027	Matchday 1	TBD	9	5	2	2	15	7	+8	55.56
Coupe de France	18–21 December 2026	TBD	Round of 64	TBD	0	0	0	0	0	0	+0	—
UEFA Champions League	4 August 2026	26 August 2026	Third qualifying round	Play-off round	4	1	1	2	6	5	+1	25.00
UEFA Europa League	16 September 2026	TBD	League phase	TBD	3	2	0	1	5	6	−1	66.67
Total					16	8	3	5	26	18	+8	50.00

Last updated: 1 November 2026
Source: Soccerway

=== Ligue 1 ===
==== League table ====
Pos	Team	Pld	W	D	L	GF	GA	GD	Pts	Qualification or relegation
2	Lille	11	6	3	2	14	8	+6	21	Qualification for the Champions League league phase
3	Paris FC	10	6	2	2	17	10	+7	20	Qualification for the Champions League league phase
4	Lyon	11	6	2	3	16	9	+7	20	Qualification for the Champions League third qualifying round
5	Marseille	11	6	1	4	23	15	+8	19	Qualification for the Europa League league phase (Note: The 2026–27 Coupe de France winners also qualify for the Europa League league phase (or the sixth-placed team if the Coupe de France winners finish in the top five). If the Coupe de France winners finish in the top six, the Conference League spot will be passed to the seventh-placed team.)
6	Brest	11	5	3	3	19	12	+7	18	Qualification for the Conference League play-off round

Updated to match(es) played on 21 November 2026. Source: Ligue 1
Rules for classification: 1) Points; 2) Goal difference; 3) Head-to-head points; 4) Head-to-head goal difference; 5) Goals scored; 6) Wins; 7) Away wins; 8) Fair-play points; 9) Drawing of lots.
(Note: Head-to-head record is used only after all the matches between the teams in question have been played).

==== Results summary ====
Overall								Home						Away					
Pld	W	D	L	GF	GA	GD	Pts	W	D	L	GF	GA	GD	W	D	L	GF	GA	GD
11	6	2	3	16	9	+7	20	4	1	0	12	3	+9	2	1	3	4	6	−2

Last updated: 21 November 2026.
Source: Ligue 1

==== Results by round ====
Round	1	2	3	4	5	6	7	8	9	10	11	12	13	14	15	16	17	18	19	20	21	22	23	24	25	26	27	28	29	30	31	32	33	34
Ground	A	H	H	A	H	A	H	A	H	A	A	H	A	H	A	H	A	H	A	H	A	H	A	H	A	A	H	A	H	A	H	H	A	H
Result	W	D	W	D	W	L	W	L	W	L	W																							
Position	4	4	2	4	2	4	1	5	3	5																								

Updated to match(es) played on 21 November 2026. Source: Ligue 1
A = Away; H = Home; W = Win; D = Draw; L = Loss

==== Matches ====
The league fixtures were announced on 10 June 2026.

22 August 2026 1	Toulouse	0–2	Lyon	Toulouse
20:45 CEST (UTC+2)	Schmidt (yellow card) 31'	Report	Nartey (yellow card) 45', (goal) 68'; Fofana 85'; Tessmann (yellow card) 90+4'	Stadium: Stade de Toulouse; Attendance: 25,837; Referee: Guillaume Paradis

29 August 2026 2	Lyon	1–1	Le Havre	Décines-Charpieu
20:45 CEST (UTC+2)	Openda 87'	Report	Seko (yellow card) 41'; Samatta 74'; Doucouré (yellow card) 90+6'	Stadium: Parc Olympique Lyonnais; Attendance: 39,841; Referee: François Letexier

4 September 2026 3	Lyon	3–1	Auxerre	Décines-Charpieu
19:00 CEST (UTC+2)	Bacher 28', (yellow card) 62'; Athekame 31'; Nuamah 53'; Morton (yellow card) 77'	Report	Piedfort (yellow card) 26'; Archer 42'; Mandengue (yellow card) 68'	Stadium: Parc Olympique Lyonnais; Attendance: 36,278; Referee: Ruddy Buquet

12 September 2026 4	Paris FC	0–0	Lyon	Paris
20:45 CEST (UTC+2)	Coppola (yellow card) 69'; Traoré (yellow card) 77'	Report	Openda (yellow card) 63'	Stadium: Stade Jean-Bouin; Attendance: 17,992; Referee: Jérôme Brisard

19 September 2026 5	Lyon	4–0	Rennes	Décines-Charpieu
20:45 CEST (UTC+2)	Niakhaté (yellow card) 2'; Nuamah 7', 30'; Šulc (yellow card) 60'; Athekame 48', (yellow card) 86'; Tolisso 76'; Nartey (yellow card) 90+2'	Report	Merlin (yellow card) 16'; Rongier (yellow card) 81'	Stadium: Parc Olympique Lyonnais; Attendance: 42,919; Referee: Mathieu Vernice

9 October 2026 6	Lens	2–1	Lyon	Lens
20:45 CEST (UTC+2)	Sotoca 36'; Gradit (yellow card) 50'; Udol 76', (red card) 84'	Report	Abner (yellow card) 23'; Merah 85'	Stadium: Stade Bollaert-Delelis; Attendance: 38,153; Referee: Jérémy Stinat

18 October 2026 7	Lyon	2–1	Nice	Décines-Charpieu
20:45 CEST (UTC+2)	Šulc 32'; Tessmann 36'; Nakamura (red card) 70'	Report	Nkounkou (yellow card) 10'; Wahi 18', (yellow card) 90+3'; Abdelmonem (yellow card) 48'; Amoura (yellow card) 65'	Stadium: Parc Olympique Lyonnais; Attendance: 43,633; Referee: François Letexier

26 October 2026 8	Paris Saint-Germain	2–0	Lyon	Paris
20:30 CEST (UTC+2)	Vitinha (yellow card) 31'; Akliouche (yellow card) 51'; Mayulu 72'; Godts 84'	Report	Nuamah (yellow card) 74'	Stadium: Parc des Princes; Attendance: 47,926; Referee: Jérôme Brisard

1 November 2026 9	Lyon	2–0	Angers	Décines-Charpieu
17:15 CET (UTC+1)	Nuamah 38'; Tolisso 86'	Report	Lefort (yellow card) 88'	Stadium: Parc Olympique Lyonnais; Attendance: 40,579; Referee: Marc Bollengier

8 November 2026 10	Brest	2–0	Lyon	Brest
17:15 CET (UTC+1)	Edjouma 22'; Ajorque (yellow card) 90', (goal) 90+4' (pen.)	Report	Tolisso (yellow card) 55'; Boudache (yellow card) 63'	Stadium: Stade Francis-Le Blé; Attendance: 13,588; Referee: Jérémy Stinat

21 November 2026 11	Lille	0–1	Lyon	Villeneuve-d'Ascq
20:45 CET (UTC+1)		Report	Bidstrup 40'; Tolisso (yellow card) 90+3'	Stadium: Stade Pierre-Mauroy; Referee: François Letexier

29 November 2026 12	Lyon	v	Monaco	Décines-Charpieu
20:45 CET (UTC+1)		Report		Stadium: Parc Olympique Lyonnais

6 December 2026 13	Troyes	v	Lyon	Troyes
15:00 CET (UTC+1)		Report		Stadium: Stade de l'Aube

13 December 2026 14	Lyon	v	Marseille	Décines-Charpieu
20:45 CET (UTC+1)		Report		Stadium: Parc Olympique Lyonnais

3 January 2027 15	Le Mans	v	Lyon	Le Mans
15:00 CET (UTC+1)		Report		Stadium: Stade Marie-Marvingt

17 January 2027 16	Lyon	v	Lorient	Décines-Charpieu
20:45 CET (UTC+1)		Report		Stadium: Parc Olympique Lyonnais

24 January 2027 17	Strasbourg	v	Lyon	Strasbourg
20:45 CET (UTC+1)		Report		Stadium: Stade de la Meinau

31 January 2027 18	Lyon	v	Lille	Décines-Charpieu
20:45 CET (UTC+1)		Report		Stadium: Parc Olympique Lyonnais

6 February 2027 19	Rennes	v	Lyon	Rennes
--:-- CET (UTC+1)		Report		Stadium: Roazhon Park

13 February 2027 20	Lyon	v	Lens	Décines-Charpieu
--:-- CET (UTC+1)		Report		Stadium: Parc Olympique Lyonnais

20 February 2027 21	Le Havre	v	Lyon	Le Havre
--:-- CET (UTC+1)		Report		Stadium: Stade Océane

27 February 2027 22	Lyon	v	Toulouse	Décines-Charpieu
--:-- CET (UTC+1)		Report		Stadium: Parc Olympique Lyonnais

6 March 2027 23	Monaco	v	Lyon	Monaco
--:-- CET (UTC+1)		Report		Stadium: Stade Louis II

13 March 2027 24	Lyon	v	Troyes	Décines-Charpieu
--:-- CET (UTC+1)		Report		Stadium: Parc Olympique Lyonnais

20 March 2027 25	Marseille	v	Lyon	Marseille
--:-- CET (UTC+1)		Report		Stadium: Stade Vélodrome

3 April 2027 26	Nice	v	Lyon	Nice
--:-- CEST (UTC+2)		Report		Stadium: Allianz Riviera

10 April 2027 27	Lyon	v	Strasbourg	Décines-Charpieu
--:-- CEST (UTC+2)		Report		Stadium: Parc Olympique Lyonnais

17 April 2027 28	Angers	v	Lyon	Angers
--:-- CEST (UTC+2)		Report		Stadium: Stade Raymond Kopa

24 April 2027 29	Lyon	v	Brest	Décines-Charpieu
--:-- CEST (UTC+2)		Report		Stadium: Parc Olympique Lyonnais

1 May 2027 30	Auxerre	v	Lyon	Auxerre
--:-- CEST (UTC+2)		Report		Stadium: Stade de l'Abbé-Deschamps

8 May 2027 31	Lyon	v	Paris Saint-Germain	Décines-Charpieu
--:-- CEST (UTC+2)		Report		Stadium: Parc Olympique Lyonnais

16 May 2027 32	Lyon	v	Le Mans	Décines-Charpieu
--:-- CEST (UTC+2)		Report		Stadium: Parc Olympique Lyonnais

22 May 2027 33	Lorient	v	Lyon	Lorient
21:00 CEST (UTC+2)		Report		Stadium: Stade du Moustoir

29 May 2027 34	Lyon	v	Paris FC	Décines-Charpieu
21:00 CEST (UTC+2)		Report		Stadium: Parc Olympique Lyonnais

=== Coupe de France ===
18–21 December 2026 Round of 64	TBD	v	Lyon	TBD
--:-- CET (UTC+1)				Stadium: TBD

=== UEFA Champions League ===
==== Third qualifying round ====
The draw for the third qualifying round was held on 20 July 2026.

4 August 2026 First leg	Sparta Prague (Czech Republic)	2–1	(France) Lyon	Prague, Czech Republic
20:00 CEST (UTC+2)	Ryneš 63', (yellow card) 90+4'; Ševínský (yellow card) 66'; Mercado 69'	Report	Suchomel 45' (o.g.); Tolisso (penalty missed) 67'	Stadium: Stadion Letná; Attendance: 17,515; Referee: Serdar Gözübüyük (Netherlands)

11 August 2026 Second leg	Lyon (France)	3–0 (4–2 agg.)	(Czech Republic) Sparta Prague	Décines-Charpieu, France
21:00 CEST (UTC+2)	Nuamah 20'; Maitland-Niles (yellow card) 54', (goal) 66'; Morton 72'	Report	Ševínský (red card) 34'; Ryneš (yellow card) 89'	Stadium: Parc Olympique Lyonnais; Attendance: 51,494; Referee: Szymon Marciniak (Poland)

==== Play-off round ====
The draw for the play-off round was held on 3 August 2026.

18 August 2026 First leg	Fenerbahçe (Turkey)	1–1	(France) Lyon	Istanbul, Turkey
22:00 TRT (UTC+3)	Greenwood 47'; Kanté (yellow card) 81'; Škriniar (yellow card) 84'	Report	Abner (yellow card) 37'; Openda 40'	Stadium: Şükrü Saracoğlu Stadium; Attendance: 41,655; Referee: Sven Jablonski (Germany)

26 August 2026 Second leg	Lyon (France)	1–2 (2–3 agg.)	(Turkey) Fenerbahçe	Décines-Charpieu, France
21:00 CEST (UTC+2)	Openda (yellow card) 51'; Fofana 61'	Report	Muriqi 24'; Brown 28'; Škriniar (yellow card) 32'; Guendouzi (yellow card) 90+4'; Nene (yellow card) 90+5'	Stadium: Parc Olympique Lyonnais; Attendance: 55,443; Referee: Maurizio Mariani (Italy)

=== UEFA Europa League ===
==== League phase ====
The draw for the league phase was held on 28 August 2026.

Pos	Team	Pld	W	D	L	GF	GA	GD	Pts	Qualification
11	(England) Sunderland	4	2	1	1	4	4	0	7	Advance to knockout phase play-offs (seeded)
12	(Netherlands) NEC	4	2	1	1	8	9	−1	7	Advance to knockout phase play-offs (seeded)
13	(France) Lyon	4	2	1	1	6	7	−1	7	Advance to knockout phase play-offs (seeded)
14	(Netherlands) AZ	4	2	0	2	7	4	+3	6	Advance to knockout phase play-offs (seeded)
15	(Belgium) Anderlecht	4	2	0	2	6	3	+3	6	Advance to knockout phase play-offs (seeded)

Updated to match(es) played on 5 November 2026. Source: UEFA
Rules for classification: League phase tiebreakers

Round	1	2	3	4	5	6	7	8
Ground	A	H	A	A	H	H	A	H
Result	W	W	L	D				
Position	10	8	12	13				

Updated to match(es) played on 5 November 2026. Source: UEFA
A = Away; H = Home; W = Win; D = Draw; L = Loss

16 September 2026 1	Anderlecht (Belgium)	1–2	(France) Lyon	Brussels, Belgium
21:00 CEST (UTC+2)	Cvetković 61'	Report	Nartey 8'; Nakamura 22'; Niakhaté (yellow card) 26'; Ouédraogo (yellow card) 44'	Stadium: Constant Vanden Stock Stadium; Attendance: 16,337; Referee: Ricardo de Burgos Bengoetxea (Spain)

15 October 2026 2	Lyon (France)	3–2	(England) Crystal Palace	Décines-Charpieu, France
18:45 CEST (UTC+2)	Tolisso 8'; Nuamah 45+2'; Nakamura (yellow card) 58'; Šulc 76'	Report	Sarr (yellow card) 36'; Pino 50', (yellow card) 56'; Kamada 81'; Richards (yellow card) 82'	Stadium: Parc Olympique Lyonnais; Attendance: 40,274; Referee: João Pinheiro (Portugal)

22 October 2026 3	TSG Hoffenheim (Germany)	3–0	(France) Lyon	Sinsheim, Germany
21:00 CEST (UTC+2)	Rots (yellow card) 9'; Kramarić 45+4'; Daghim 49'; Burger (yellow card) 72'; Kabak (yellow card) 81'; Hložek 83'	Report	Niakhaté (yellow card) 90+3'	Stadium: Rhein-Neckar-Arena; Attendance: 21,029; Referee: Halil Umut Meler (Turkey)

5 November 2026 4	Real Sociedad (Spain)	1–1	(France) Lyon	San Sebastián, Spain
18:45 CET (UTC+1)	Óskarsson 28'; Guedes (yellow card) 61'; Barrenetxea (yellow card) 77'; Herrera (yellow card) 89'	Report	Boudache (yellow card) 38'; Tolisso 54'; Duranville (yellow card) 82'; Greif (yellow card) 87'; Abner (yellow card) 90+1'	Stadium: Anoeta; Referee: Anastasios Papapetrou (Greece)

26 November 2026 5	Lyon (France)	v	(Norway) Lillestrøm	Décines-Charpieu, France
21:00 CET (UTC+1)		Report		Stadium: Parc Olympique Lyonnais

10 December 2026 6	Lyon (France)	v	(Belgium) Union Saint-Gilloise	Décines-Charpieu, France
21:00 CET (UTC+1)		Report		Stadium: Parc Olympique Lyonnais

21 January 2027 7	Jagiellonia Białystok (Poland)	v	(France) Lyon	Białystok, Poland
18:45 CET (UTC+1)		Report		Stadium: Stadion Miejski

28 January 2027 8	Lyon (France)	v	(Germany) Bayer Leverkusen	Décines-Charpieu, France
21:00 CET (UTC+1)		Report		Stadium: Parc Olympique Lyonnais

== Statistics ==
=== Appearances and goals ===
No.	Pos	Nat	Player	Total		Ligue 1		Coupe de France		UEFA Champions League		UEFA Europa League	
No.	Pos	Nat	Player	Apps	Goals	Apps	Goals	Apps	Goals	Apps	Goals	Apps	Goals
Goalkeepers
1	GK	(Slovakia) SVK	Dominik Greif	13	0	7	0	0	0	4	0	2	0
25	GK	(France) FRA	Justin Bengui	0	0	0	0	0	0	0	0	0	0
40	GK	(France) FRA	Rémy Descamps	3	0	2	0	0	0	0	0	1	0
50	GK	(Mali) MLI	Lassine Diarra	0	0	0	0	0	0	0	0	0	0
Defenders
3	DF	(Argentina) ARG	Nicolás Tagliafico	4	0	1+1	0	0	0	0+1	0	0+1	0
13	DF	(Switzerland) SUI	Zachary Athekame	11	2	9	2	0	0	0+1	0	1	0
16	DF	(Brazil) BRA	Abner	13	0	7+1	0	0	0	4	0	1	0
19	DF	(Senegal) SEN	Moussa Niakhaté	12	0	7	0	0	0	3	0	1+1	0
20	DF	(Austria) AUT	Felix Bacher	12	1	8+1	1	0	0	0	0	2+1	0
21	DF	(Netherlands) NED	Ruben Kluivert	11	0	1+3	0	0	0	4	0	3	0
22	DF	(Angola) ANG	Clinton Mata	7	0	2	0	0	0	1+2	0	2	0
37	DF	(France) FRA	Steeve Kango	1	0	0	0	0	0	0	0	1	0
76	DF	(Burkina Faso) BFA	Mohamed Ouédraogo	5	0	1	0	0	0	1+2	0	1	0
85	DF	(France) FRA	Noham Kamara	1	0	0	0	0	0	0	0	0+1	0
Midfielders
2	MF	(Denmark) DEN	Mads Bidstrup	13	0	8	0	0	0	0+2	0	1+2	0
6	MF	(United States) USA	Tanner Tessmann	15	1	3+5	1	0	0	4	0	2+1	0
8	MF	(France) FRA	Corentin Tolisso	16	3	7+2	2	0	0	4	0	1+2	1
10	MF	(Czech Republic) CZE	Pavel Šulc	10	2	5+2	1	0	0	0+1	0	0+2	1
18	MF	(France) FRA	Khalis Merah	7	1	1+5	1	0	0	0	0	1	0
23	MF	(England) ENG	Tyler Morton	14	1	6+1	0	0	0	4	1	2+1	0
99	MF	(Denmark) DEN	Noah Nartey	12	2	2+6	1	0	0	0+1	0	3	1
Forwards
7	FW	(Ghana) GHA	Ernest Nuamah	13	6	7	4	0	0	3+1	1	1+1	1
11	FW	(Japan) JPN	Keito Nakamura	8	1	1+4	0	0	0	0	0	3	1
17	FW	(Belgium) BEL	Loïs Openda	10	2	5	1	0	0	4	1	1	0
24	FW	(Belgium) BEL	Julien Duranville	5	0	4	0	0	0	0+1	0	0	0
26	FW	(Algeria) ALG	Kaïl Boudache	15	0	3+6	0	0	0	0+3	0	2+1	0
45	FW	(France) FRA	Rémi Himbert	3	0	1+1	0	0	0	0	0	1	0
Players transferred/loaned out during the season
11	FW	(Belgium) BEL	Malick Fofana	6	2	0+2	1	0	0	3+1	1	0	0
39	MF	(Portugal) POR	Mathys De Carvalho	2	0	1	0	0	0	1	0	0	0
98	DF	(England) ENG	Ainsley Maitland-Niles	4	1	0	0	0	0	4	1	0	0

Last updated: 1 November 2026
Source: Competitions
