= Adil Hamdani =

French footballer (born 2007)

Personal information
- Date of birth: 21 January 2009 (age 17)
- Place of birth: Paris, France
- Height: 1.74 m (5 ft 9 in)
- Position: Winger

Team information
- Current team: Lyon
- Number: 34

Youth career
- 2014–2020: CO Vincennes
- 2020–2022: US Villejuif
- 2022–: Lyon

Senior career*
Years	Team	Apps	(Gls)
2025–	Lyon B	14	(4)
2025–	Lyon	4	(0)

International career^{‡}
2024–2025	France U16	9	(0)
2025–2026	France U17	4	(0)
2026–	France U18	2	(0)
- * Club domestic league appearances and goals as of 8 November 2026 ‡ National team caps and goals as of 27 September 2026

Adil Hamdani (born 21 January 2009) is a French footballer who plays as a winger for Ligue 1 club Lyon.

== Early career ==
Born in Paris, Hamdani started playing football for local teams, before earning a move to Lyon's youth academy in 2022.

In 2025, Hamdani received the Golden Kid award for the Best U17 player, an award given to the most promising young footballers from French youth academies.

== Club career ==
On 23 November 2025, Hamdani made his debut for Lyon, coming on as a late-game substitute for Adam Karabec in a goalless draw against Auxerre in Ligue 1. At 16 years old and 306 days, he became the sixth youngest player to appear for Lyon in an official game, and the third youngest in the 21st century, behind Willem Geubbels and Rayan Cherki.

== International career ==
Beside from France, Hamdani is also eligible to represent Algeria and Sénégal. He has represented France internationally at youth levels, having played for the under-16s and under-17s.

== Career statistics ==
As of match played 8 November 2026

Appearances and goals by club, season and competition
Club	Season	League			National cup		Europe		Other		Total	
Club	Season	Division	Apps	Goals	Apps	Goals	Apps	Goals	Apps	Goals	Apps	Goals
Lyon B	2025–26	National 3	7	1	—		—		—		7	1
Lyon B	2026–27	National 2	7	3	—		—		—		7	3
Lyon B	Total		14	4	—		—		—		14	4
Lyon	2025–26	Ligue 1	4	0	1	0	2 (Note: Appearances in UEFA Europa League)	0	—		7	0
Lyon	2026–27	Ligue 1	0	0	0	0	0	0	—		0	0
Lyon	Total		4	0	1	0	2	0	—		7	0
Career total			18	4	1	0	2	0	0	0	21	4
