= Steeve Kango =

French footballer (born 2006)

Personal information
- Date of birth: 9 December 2006 (age 19)
- Place of birth: Vaulx-en-Velin, France
- Height: 1.81 m (5 ft 11 in)
- Position: Right-back

Team information
- Current team: Lyon
- Number: 37

Youth career
- 2015–2019: ASVEL
- 2019–2021: Vaulx-en-Velin
- 2021–2024: Lyon

Senior career*
Years	Team	Apps	(Gls)
2023–	Lyon B	46	(1)
2026–	Lyon	4	(0)

International career^{‡}
2023	France U18	2	(0)
- * Club domestic league appearances and goals as of 17 October 2026 ‡ National team caps and goals as of 19 September 2025

Steeve Kango (born 9 December 2006) is a French professional footballer who plays as a right-back for Ligue 1 club Lyon.

== Early career ==
Born in Vaulx-en-Velin, Kango began playing football for ASVEL before moving to the team of his native city FC Vaulx-en-Velin. He joined the youth academy of region giants Lyon in 2021.

== Club career ==
On 12 March 2026, Kango made his professional debut with Lyon, starting in an UEFA Europa League round of 16 away game against Celta Vigo. On 7 July 2026, he signed his first professional contract with Lyon until June 2029.

== International career ==
Kango is eligible to represent Algeria, Central African Republic and France. He was called up to Algeria U17 training camp in March 2022.

In September 2023, he participated in the Tournoi de Limoges with France U18 and won the tournament.

== Career statistics ==
As of match played 22 October 2026

Appearances and goals by club, season and competition
Club	Season	League			National cup		Europe		Other		Total	
Club	Season	Division	Apps	Goals	Apps	Goals	Apps	Goals	Apps	Goals	Apps	Goals
Lyon B	2023–24	National 2	7	0	—		—		1 (Note: Appearance(s) in Premier League International Cup)	0	8	0
Lyon B	2024–25	National 2	19	0	—		—		6	0	25	0
Lyon B	2025–26	National 2	15	1	—		—		—		15	1
Lyon B	2026–27	National 2	5	0	—		—		—		5	0
Lyon B	Total		46	1	—		—		7	0	53	1
Lyon	2025–26	Ligue 1	4	0	0	0	2 (Note: Appearance(s) in UEFA Europa League)	0	—		6	0
Lyon	2026–27	Ligue 1	0	0	0	0	1	0	—		1	0
Lyon	Total		4	0	0	0	3	0	—		7	0
Career total			48	1	0	0	3	0	7	0	60	1
