= Alejandro Gomes Rodríguez =

English footballer (born 2008)

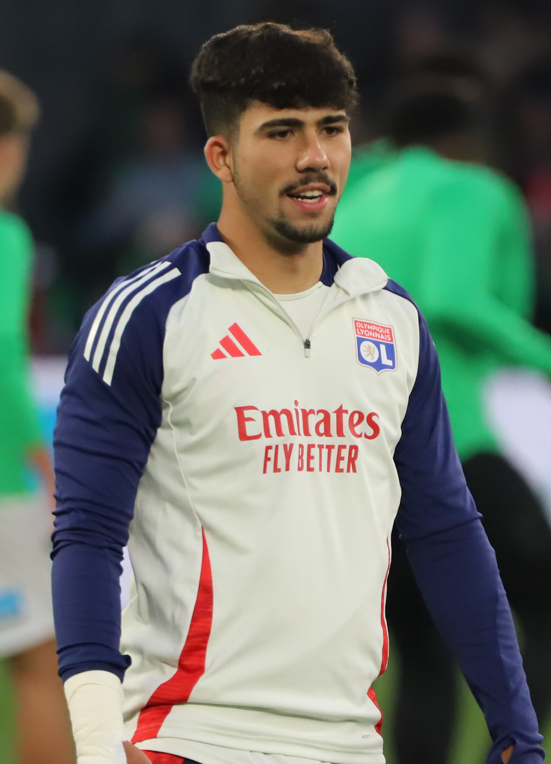
- Gomes Rodríguez with Lyon in 2025

Personal information
- Full name: Alejandro Jesús Gomes Rodríguez
- Date of birth: 11 March 2008 (age 18)
- Place of birth: Caracas, Venezuela
- Height: 1.80 m (5 ft 11 in)
- Position: Forward

Team information
- Current team: Lyon
- Number: 32

Youth career
- 2020–2022: Eastleigh
- 2022–2024: Southampton
- 2024–: Lyon

Senior career*
Years	Team	Apps	(Gls)
2024–	Lyon B	20	(7)
2025–	Lyon	2	(0)
2026	→ Annecy (loan)	13	(2)

International career^{‡}
2023	England U15	1	(2)
2023	Portugal U15	5	(1)
2023–2024	England U16	10	(8)
2023	Venezuela U17	1	(0)
2024–2025	England U17	15	(10)
2024–2025	England U18	8	(3)
2025–	England U20	2	(0)
- * Club domestic league appearances and goals as of 10 November 2026 ‡ National team caps and goals as of 01:34, 19 November 2025 (UTC)

Alejandro Jesús Gomes Rodríguez (born 11 March 2008) is a professional footballer who plays as a forward for Ligue 1 club Lyon. Born in Venezuela, he represents England at youth level.

== Early life ==
Gomes Rodríguez was born on 11 March 2008 in Caracas, Venezuela. He is of Portuguese descent through his grandparents. As a youth player, he joined the youth academy of English side Eastleigh. In 2022, he joined the youth academy of English side Southampton. In 2024, he was described as "regarded as among the best strikers in [England]... for his age". After that, he joined the youth academy of Ligue 1 side Lyon.

== Club career ==
=== Lyon ===
On 10 April 2025, Gomes Rodríguez was included in first team matchday squad for the first time after he was named on the bench for Lyon's Europa League match against Manchester United. On 4 May 2025, he made his professional debut for Lyon in Ligue 1, coming on as a substitute in a 2–1 loss to Lens. On 19 September 2025, Alejandro Gomes Rodriguez extended his contract with Olympique Lyonnais until 2028. On 29 January 2026, he scored his first competitive goal for Lyon in the Europa League, scoring off the bench in a 4–2 win against PAOK.

==== Loan to Annecy ====
On 2 February 2026, he joined Ligue 2 side FC Annecy on loan until the end of the season.

== International career ==
Gomes Rodríguez has been an England, Portugal, and Venezuela youth international. He has played for the England U15s, England U16s, England U17s and England U18s as well as the Portugal U15s and Venezuela U17s.

Gomes Rodríguez was included in the England squad for the 2025 UEFA European Under-17 Championship. He scored goals in all of their group games against Belgium, Italy and Czech Republic.

On 10 October 2025, Gomes Rodríguez made his England U20 debut during a 1–0 defeat to Switzerland at St. George's Park.

In October 2025, Gomes Rodríguez was named in the squad for that November's 2025 FIFA U-17 World Cup in Qatar. On 4 November 2025, he made his U-17 World Cup debut in England's 0–3 loss to his native Venezuela U17s. He scored a goal in their next group game which saw England defeat Haiti. Gomes Rodríguez received a red card during their round of sixteen elimination against Austria.

== Career statistics ==
=== Club ===
As of match played 10 November 2026

Appearances and goals by club, season and competition
Club	Season	League			National cup		Continental		Other		Total	
Club	Season	Division	Apps	Goals	Apps	Goals	Apps	Goals	Apps	Goals	Apps	Goals
Lyon B	2024–25	National 2	15	5	—		—		7 (Note: Appearance(s) in Premier League International Cup)	1	22	6
Lyon B	2025–26	National 2	1	1	—		—		—		1	1
Lyon B	2026–27	National 2	4	1	—		—		—		4	1
Lyon B	Total		20	7	—		—		7	1	27	8
Lyon	2024–25	Ligue 1	1	0	—		0	0	—		1	0
Lyon	2025–26	Ligue 1	0	0	1	0	3 (Note: Appearances in UEFA Europa League)	1	—		4	1
Lyon	2026–27	Ligue 1	1	0	0	0	1	0	—		2	0
Lyon	Total		2	0	1	0	4	1	—		7	1
Annecy (loan)	2025–26	Ligue 2	13	2	—		—		—		13	2
Career total			35	9	1	0	4	1	7	1	47	11
