= Rémi Himbert =

French footballer

Personal information
- Full name: Rémi Stéphane Himbert
- Date of birth: 29 February 2008 (age 18)
- Place of birth: Saint-Avold, France
- Height: 1.78 m (5 ft 10 in)
- Position: Winger

Team information
- Current team: Lyon
- Number: 45

Youth career
- 2013–2022: Étoile Naborienne
- 2022–2023: Thionville Lusitanos
- 2023–2025: Lyon

Senior career*
| Years | Team | Apps | (Gls) |
| 2025– | Lyon II | 12 | (3) |
| 2026– | Lyon | 7 | (1) |

International career^{‡}
| 2023–2024 | France U16 | 16 | (6) |
| 2024–2025 | France U17 | 16 | (5) |
| 2025–2026 | France U18 | 6 | (2) |
| 2026– | France U19 | 2 | (1) |
- * Club domestic league appearances and goals as of 19 September 2026 ‡ National team caps and goals as of 1 October 2026

Rémi Stéphane Himbert (born 29 February 2008) is a French professional footballer who plays as a winger for Ligue 1 club Lyon.

== Early years ==
Himbert was born in Saint-Avold, in the Moselle department. Himbert is a product of the youth academies of the French clubs Étoile Naborienne and Thionville Lusitanos, before joining Lyon on 21 March 2023, on a three-year contract.

== Club career ==
=== Lyon ===
He trained with their senior team in the preseason of 2025, and was promoted to Lyon's reserves for the 2025–26 season. He made his senior and professional debut with Lyon as a substitute in a 2–1 Ligue 1 win over Brest on 18 January 2026. On 29 January 2026, Himbert made his first start for the first team in the UEFA Europa League against PAOK Salonika at the Groupama Stadium. During that match, he scored his first professional goal, equalizing for Lyon in the first half. With that goal, scored at the age of 17 years and 334 days, Himbert became the youngest goalscorer in Olympique Lyonnais’ history in European competitions, surpassing the previous record held by Karim Benzema.

== International career ==
Himbert was called up to the France U17s for the 2025 UEFA European Under-17 Championship. A couple of months later, he also appeared for the U17s at the 2025 FIFA U-17 World Cup.

== Career statistics ==
As of match played 26 October 2026

Appearances and goals by club, season and competition
| Club | Season | League | | | Cup | | Europe | | Other | | Total | |
| Club | Season | Division | Apps | Goals | Apps | Goals | Apps | Goals | Apps | Goals | Apps | Goals |
|---|---|---|---|---|---|---|---|---|---|---|---|---|
| Lyon B | 2025–26 | National 3 | 9 | 2 | — | | — | | — | | 9 | 2 |
| Lyon B | 2026–27 | National 2 | 3 | 1 | — | | — | | — | | 3 | 1 |
| Lyon B | Total | | 12 | 3 | — | | — | | — | | 12 | 3 |
| Lyon | 2025–26 | Ligue 1 | 6 | 1 | 2 | 1 | 3 (Note: Appearances in UEFA Europa League) | 1 | — | | 11 | 3 |
| Lyon | 2026–27 | Ligue 1 | 2 | 0 | 0 | 0 | 1 | 0 | — | | 3 | 0 |
| Lyon | Total | | 8 | 1 | 2 | 1 | 4 | 1 | — | | 14 | 3 |
| Career total | | | 20 | 4 | 2 | 1 | 4 | 1 | 0 | 0 | 26 | 6 |
