= 2025–26 Olympique Lyonnais season =

Olympique Lyonnais
2025–26 season
- President: Michele Kang
- Head coach: Paulo Fonseca; Jorge Maciel (caretaker in Ligue 1, until 30 November)
- Stadium: Parc Olympique Lyonnais
- Ligue 1: 4th
- Coupe de France: Quarter-finals
- UEFA Europa League: Round of 16
- Top goalscorer: League: Pavel Šulc; Corentin Tolisso (11 each); All: Corentin Tolisso (15)
- Highest home attendance: 58,257 vs Paris Saint-Germain (9 November 2025)
- Lowest home attendance: 26,149 vs PAOK (29 January 2026)
- Average home league attendance: 49,848 (84.2% of capacity)
- Biggest win: Lyon 6–0 Maccabi Tel Aviv (27 November 2025)
- Biggest defeat: Lyon 0–4 Lens (17 May 2026)
Home colours	Away colours	Third colours

The 2025–26 season was the 76th season in the history of Olympique Lyonnais, and their 37th consecutive season in the French top flight. In addition to the domestic league, the club participated in this season's editions of the Coupe de France and the UEFA Europa League.

== Players ==
=== Squad information ===
Players and squad numbers last updated on 2 February 2026.
Note: Flags indicate national team as has been defined under FIFA eligibility rules. Players may hold more than one non-FIFA nationality.

No.	Player	Nat.	Position(s)	Date of birth (age)	Contract ends	Transfer fee	Signed from
Goalkeepers
1	Dominik Greif	(Slovakia)	GK	6 April 1997 (age 29)	2029	€4M	(Spain) Mallorca
40	Rémy Descamps	(France)	GK	25 June 1996 (age 30)	2027	Free	(France) Nantes
50	Lassine Diarra	(Mali)	GK	11 November 2002 (age 24)	2027	Free	(France) Châteauroux
Defenders
3	Nicolás Tagliafico	(Argentina)	LB	21 August 1992 (age 34)	2027	€4.2M	(Netherlands) Ajax
16	Abner	(Brazil)	LB	27 May 2000 (age 26)	2029	€8M	(Spain) Real Betis
19	Moussa Niakhaté	(Senegal)	CB	8 March 1996 (age 30)	2028	€31.9M	(England) Nottingham Forest
21	Ruben Kluivert	(Netherlands)	CB	21 May 2001 (age 25)	2030	€3.78M	(Portugal) Casa Pia
22	Clinton Mata	(Angola)	CB / RB	7 November 1992 (age 34)	2028	€5M	(Belgium) Club Brugge
33	Hans Hateboer	(Netherlands)	RB / CB	9 January 1994 (age 32)	2026	Loan	(France) Rennes
85	Noham Kamara	(France)	CB / RB	27 January 2007 (age 19)	2026	Loan	(France) Paris Saint-Germain
98	Ainsley Maitland-Niles	(England)	RB / RW	29 August 1997 (age 29)	2027	Free	(England) Arsenal
Midfielders
5	Orel Mangala	(Belgium)	DM / CM	18 March 1998 (age 28)	2028	€35.1M	(England) Nottingham Forest
6	Tanner Tessmann	(United States)	DM / CM	24 September 2001 (age 25)	2029	€6M	(Italy) Venezia
8	Corentin Tolisso	(France)	CM / AM	3 August 1994 (age 32)	2027	Free	(Germany) Bayern Munich
10	Pavel Šulc	(Czech Republic)	AM / CF	29 December 2000 (age 25)	2029	€7.5M	(Czech Republic) Viktoria Plzeň
23	Tyler Morton	(England)	DM / CM	31 October 2002 (age 24)	2030	€10M	(England) Liverpool
39	Mathys De Carvalho	(Portugal)	DM / CM	1 May 2005 (age 21)	2028	N/A	(France) Youth Sector
44	Khalis Merah	(France)	CM / AM	24 February 2007 (age 19)	2029	N/A	(France) Youth Sector
99	Noah Nartey	(Denmark)	CM / AM	5 October 2005 (age 21)	2030	€7.5M	(Denmark) Brøndby
Forwards
7	Adam Karabec	(Czech Republic)	RW / AM	2 July 2003 (age 23)	2026	Loan (€0.3M)	(Czech Republic) Sparta Prague
9	Endrick	(Brazil)	CF / RW	21 July 2006 (age 20)	2026	Loan (€1M)	(Spain) Real Madrid
11	Malick Fofana	(Belgium)	LW / RW	31 March 2005 (age 21)	2028	€17M	(Belgium) Gent
17	Afonso Moreira	(Portugal)	LW / RW	19 March 2005 (age 21)	2029	€2M	(Portugal) Sporting CP
18	Rachid Ghezzal	(Algeria)	RW / AM	9 May 1992 (age 34)	2026	Free	(Turkey) Çaykur Rizespor
37	Ernest Nuamah	(Ghana)	RW / LW	1 November 2003 (age 23)	2028	€28.5M	(Belgium) RWDM Brussels
77	Roman Yaremchuk	(Ukraine)	CF	27 November 1995 (age 30)	2026	Loan (€1.5M)	(Greece) Olympiacos
Left during the season
20	Saël Kumbedi	(France)	RB	26 March 2005 (age 21)	2027	€1M	(France) Le Havre
20	Martín Satriano	(Uruguay)	CF	20 February 2001 (age 25)	2029	€6M	(France) Lens
29	Enzo Molebe	(France)	CF / LW	18 September 2007 (age 19)	2027	N/A	(France) Youth Sector
32	Alejandro Gomes Rodríguez	(England)	CF / LW	11 March 2008 (age 18)	2027	N/A	(France) Youth Sector
41	Teo Barišić	(Croatia)	RB / CB	30 September 2004 (age 22)	2028	N/A	(France) Youth Sector
69	Georges Mikautadze	(Georgia (country))	CF	31 October 2000 (age 26)	2028	€18.5M	(France) Metz

=== Out on loan ===
Note: Flags indicate national team as defined under FIFA eligibility rules; some limited exceptions apply. Players may hold more than one non-FIFA nationality.

No.	Pos.	Nation	Player
—	GK	FRA	Justin Bengui (at (Belgium) RWDM Brussels until 30 June 2026)
—	GK	USA	Matt Turner (at (United States) New England Revolution until 30 June 2026)
—	DF	CRO	Duje Ćaleta-Car (at (Spain) Real Sociedad until 30 June 2026)
—	DF	FRA	Yacine Chaïb (at (Belgium) RWDM Brussels until 30 June 2026)
—	MF	CIV	Paul Akouokou (at (Spain) Zaragoza until 30 June 2026)

No.	Pos.	Nation	Player
—	MF	FRA	Mahamadou Diawara (at (Belgium) Antwerp until 30 June 2026)
—	MF	SEN	Pierre Dorival (at (France) Stade Briochin until 30 June 2026)
—	FW	ENG	Alejandro Gomes Rodríguez (at (France) Annecy until 30 June 2026)
—	FW	FRA	Enzo Molebe (at (France) Montpellier until 30 June 2026)
—	FW	URU	Martín Satriano (at (Spain) Getafe until 30 June 2026)

=== Players from Olympique Lyonnais Reserves and Academy ===
Note: Flags indicate national team as defined under FIFA eligibility rules; some limited exceptions apply. Players may hold more than one non-FIFA nationality.

No.	Pos.	Nation	Player
30	GK	CIV	Yvann Konan
32	MF	SEN	Fallou Fall
34	FW	FRA	Adil Hamdani
35	GK	POR	Matthias Da Silva
36	DF	MAR	Achraf Laâziri

No.	Pos.	Nation	Player
38	DF	FRA	Steeve Kango
45	MF	FRA	Rémi Himbert
46	MF	POR	Tiago Gonçalves
67	DF	COD	Prince Mbatshi

== Transfers ==
=== In ===
No.	Pos.	Player	Transferred from	Fee	Date	Source
Summer
14	DF	(Brazil) Adryelson	(Belgium) Anderlecht	Loan return	30 June 2025	
36	DF	(Morocco) Achraf Laâziri	(Belgium) RWDM	Loan return	30 June 2025	
38	MF	(France) Islam Halifa	(Belgium) RWDM	Loan return	30 June 2025	
30	GK	(France) Mathieu Patouillet	(France) Sochaux	Loan return	30 June 2025	
5	MF	(Belgium) Orel Mangala	(England) Everton	Loan return	30 June 2025	
	GK	(France) Justin Bengui	(Serbia) Jedinstvo Ub	Loan return	30 June 2025	
34	MF	(France) Mahamadou Diawara	(France) Le Havre	Loan return	30 June 2025	
17	FW	(Portugal) Afonso Moreira	(Portugal) Sporting CP	€2M	22 July 2025	
21	DF	(Netherlands) Ruben Kluivert	(Portugal) Casa Pia	€3.78M	25 July 2025	
	GK	(United States) Matt Turner	(England) Nottingham Forest	€8M	1 August 2025	
10	MF	(Czech Republic) Pavel Šulc	(Czech Republic) Viktoria Plzeň	€7.5M	4 August 2025	
23	MF	(England) Tyler Morton	(England) Liverpool	€10M	5 August 2025	
7	MF	(Czech Republic) Adam Karabec	(Czech Republic) Sparta Prague	Loan (€0.3M)	12 August 2025	
1	GK	(Slovakia) Dominik Greif	(Spain) Mallorca	€4M	18 August 2025	
20	FW	(Uruguay) Martín Satriano	(France) Lens	Loan (€1M)	1 September 2025	
18	FW	(Algeria) Rachid Ghezzal	(Turkey) Çaykur Rizespor	Free	5 September 2025	
33	DF	(Netherlands) Hans Hateboer	(France) Rennes	Loan	17 October 2025	
Winter
9	FW	(Brazil) Endrick	(Spain) Real Madrid	Loan (€1M)	1 January 2026	
20	FW	(Uruguay) Martín Satriano	(France) Lens	€5M	17 January 2025	
99	MF	(Denmark) Noah Nartey	(Denmark) Brøndby	€7.5M	19 January 2026	
77	FW	(Ukraine) Roman Yaremchuk	(Greece) Olympiacos	Loan (€1.5M)	2 February 2026	
85	DF	(France) Noham Kamara	(France) Paris Saint-Germain	Loan	2 February 2026	

=== Out ===
No.	Pos.	Player	Transferred to	Fee	Date	Source
Summer
18	FW	(France) Rayan Cherki	(England) Manchester City	€36.5M	10 June 2025	
27	DF	(Comoros) Warmed Omari	(France) Rennes	End of loan	30 June 2025	
23	MF	(Argentina) Thiago Almada	(Brazil) Botafogo	End of loan	30 June 2025	
10	FW	(France) Alexandre Lacazette	(Saudi Arabia) Neom	Free	1 July 2025	
17	FW	(Algeria) Saïd Benrahma	(Saudi Arabia) Neom	€12M	1 July 2025	
24	MF	(France) Johann Lepenant	(France) Nantes	€2.5M	1 July 2025	
27	FW	(Sweden) Amin Sarr	(Italy) Hellas Verona	€3.5M	1 July 2025	
	DF	(Republic of the Congo) Jérémy Mounsesse	(France) Quevilly-Rouen	Free	4 July 2025	
14	DF	(Brazil) Adryelson	(United Arab Emirates) Al-Wasl	€2.2M	16 July 2025	
	GK	(France) Justin Bengui	(Belgium) RWDM Brussels	Loan	23 July 2025	
7	MF	(France) Jordan Veretout	(Qatar) Al-Arabi	€0.5M	25 July 2025	
1	GK	(Brazil) Lucas Perri	(England) Leeds United	€16M	26 July 2025	
	GK	(United States) Matt Turner	(United States) New England Revolution	Loan	1 August 2025	
55	DF	(Croatia) Duje Ćaleta-Car	(Spain) Real Sociedad	Loan (€0.5M)	1 August 2025	
35	DF	(France) Yacine Chaïb	(Belgium) RWDM Brussels	Loan	14 August 2025	
31	MF	(Serbia) Nemanja Matić	(Italy) Sassuolo	Free	14 August 2025	
36	FW	(France) Romain Perret	(Luxembourg) UNA Strassen	Free	20 August 2025	
38	MF	(France) Islam Halifa	(France) Red Star	Free	24 August 2025	
20	DF	(France) Saël Kumbedi	(Germany) VfL Wolfsburg	Loan (€1M)	28 August 2025	
69	FW	(Georgia (country)) Georges Mikautadze	(Spain) Villarreal	€31M	1 September 2025	
4	MF	(Ivory Coast) Paul Akouokou	(Spain) Zaragoza	Loan	1 September 2025	
30	GK	(France) Mathieu Patouillet	(Saudi Arabia) Al-Hilal	€0.35M	8 September 2025	
34	MF	(France) Mahamadou Diawara	(Belgium) Antwerp	Loan (€0.25M)	8 September 2025	
	FW	(Thailand) Erawan Garnier	(France) Lens	Free	24 October 2025	
	MF	(Senegal) Pierre Dorival	(France) Stade Briochin	Loan	24 October 2025	
Winter
20	DF	(France) Saël Kumbedi	(Germany) VfL Wolfsburg	€6M	1 January 2026	
41	DF	(Croatia) Teo Barišić	(Croatia) Rijeka	€0.4M	14 January 2026	
20	FW	(Uruguay) Martín Satriano	(Spain) Getafe	Loan	17 January 2025	
29	FW	(France) Enzo Molebe	(France) Montpellier	Loan	2 February 2026	
32	FW	(England) Alejandro Gomes Rodríguez	(France) Annecy	Loan	2 February 2026	

== Pre-season and friendlies ==
Win Draw Loss Fixtures

Lyon started the pre-season campaign on 7 July 2025 in the club's training ground in Décines-Charpieu.

19 July 2025 Friendly	Lyon	1–0	Villefranche	Décines-Charpieu, France
10:30 CEST (UTC+2)	Tolisso 65' (pen.)	Report	Marcel (yellow card) 22'	Stadium: Stade Gérard Houllier; Attendance: 0

23 July 2025 Friendly	Lyon	0–0	RWDM Brussels	Décines-Charpieu, France
10:30 CEST (UTC+2)	Niakhaté (yellow card) 45'	Report		Stadium: Stade Gérard Houllier; Attendance: 0

26 July 2025 Friendly	Hamburger SV	0–4	Lyon	Hamburg, Germany
15:00 CEST (UTC+2)	Remberg (yellow card) 57'	Report	Fofana 11'; Maitland-Niles 31'; Mikautadze 39'; Moreira 95'	Stadium: Volksparkstadion; Attendance: 45,757; Referee: Jarno Wienefeld (Germany)
Note: Match was 120 minutes long.

30 July 2025 Friendly	Mallorca	0–4	Lyon	Kufstein, Austria
17:30 CEST (UTC+2)		Report	Abner 15', 30'; Mikautadze 20'; Merah 37'	Stadium: Kufstein Arena

2 August 2025 Friendly	Bayern Munich	2–1	Lyon	Munich, Germany
15:30 CEST (UTC+2)	Olise 53' (pen.), 62'; Laimer (yellow card) 67'	Report	Moreira (yellow card) 50'; Mata (yellow card) 52'; Gomes Rodríguez 83'; Matić (yellow card) 90+1'	Stadium: Allianz Arena; Attendance: 34,500; Referee: Florian Badstübner (Germany)

9 August 2025 Friendly	Lyon	2–1	Getafe	Bourgoin-Jallieu, France
18:00 CEST (UTC+2)	Mikautadze 25'; Maitland-Niles 64' (pen.)		Milla 40' (pen.); Djené (red card) 63'	Stadium: Stade Pierre Rajon

== Competitions ==
=== Overall record ===
Competition	First match	Last match	Starting round	Final position	Record							
Competition	First match	Last match	Starting round	Final position	Pld	W	D	L	GF	GA	GD	Win %
Ligue 1	16 August 2025	17 May 2026	Matchday 1	4th	34	18	6	10	53	40	+13	52.94
Coupe de France	21 December 2025	5 March 2026	Round of 64	Quarter-finals	4	3	1	0	9	3	+6	75.00
UEFA Europa League	25 September 2025	19 March 2026	League phase	Round of 16	10	7	1	2	19	8	+11	70.00
Total					48	28	8	12	81	51	+30	58.33

Source: Soccerway

=== Ligue 1 ===
==== League table ====
Pos	Team	Pld	W	D	L	GF	GA	GD	Pts	Qualification or relegation
2	Lens	34	22	4	8	66	35	+31	70	Qualification for the Champions League league phase
3	Lille	34	18	7	9	52	37	+15	61	Qualification for the Champions League league phase
4	Lyon	34	18	6	10	53	40	+13	60	Qualification for the Champions League third qualifying round
5	Marseille	34	18	5	11	63	45	+18	59	Qualification for the Europa League league phase (Note: Since the 2025–26 Coupe de France winners, Lens, qualified for the Champions League via league position, the Europa League spot awarded to the cup winners was passed to the sixth-placed team, and the Conference League spot was passed to the seventh-placed team.)
6	Rennes	34	17	8	9	59	50	+9	59	Qualification for the Europa League league phase

Source: Ligue 1
Rules for classification: 1) Points; 2) Goal difference; 3) Head-to-head points; 4) Head-to-head goal difference; 5) Head-to-head goals scored; 6) Head-to-head away goals scored; 7) Goals scored; 8) Away goals scored; 9) Fair-play points (Note: Head-to-head record is used only after all the matches between the teams in question have been played).

==== Results summary ====
Overall								Home						Away					
Pld	W	D	L	GF	GA	GD	Pts	W	D	L	GF	GA	GD	W	D	L	GF	GA	GD
34	18	6	10	53	40	+13	60	12	1	4	30	18	+12	6	5	6	23	22	+1

Source: Ligue 1

==== Results by round ====
Round	1	2	3	4	5	6	7	8	9	10	11	12	13	14	15	16	17	18	19	20	21	22	23	24	25	26	27	28	29	30	31	32	33	34
Ground	A	H	H	A	H	A	H	A	H	A	A	H	A	H	A	H	A	H	A	H	A	H	A	A	H	A	H	A	H	A	H	H	A	H
Result	W	W	W	L	W	W	L	L	W	D	D	L	D	W	L	W	W	W	W	W	W	W	L	L	D	D	L	D	W	W	W	W	L	L
Position	4	1	2	4	3	2	4	5	4	5	6	7	7	6	5	5	5	4	4	4	3	3	3	3	4	4	4	6	5	3	3	3	4	4

Source: Ligue 1
A = Away; H = Home; W = Win; D = Draw; L = Loss

==== Matches ====
The league fixtures were announced on 27 June 2025.

16 August 2025 1	Lens	0–1	Lyon	Lens
17:00 CEST (UTC+2)	Baidoo (yellow card) 34'; Sarr (yellow card) 42'	Report	Mikautadze 45+1'; Kumbedi (yellow card) 56'; Abner (yellow card) 61'; Karabec (yellow card) 90+5'	Stadium: Stade Bollaert-Delelis; Attendance: 38,137; Referee: Romain Lissorgue

23 August 2025 2	Lyon	3–0	Metz	Décines-Charpieu
21:05 CEST (UTC+2)	Fofana 25'; Tolisso 30'; Karabec 83'	Report	Traoré (yellow card) 54'; Kouao (yellow card) 82'	Stadium: Parc Olympique Lyonnais; Attendance: 49,853; Referee: Eric Wattellier

31 August 2025 3	Lyon	1–0	Marseille	Décines-Charpieu
20:45 CEST (UTC+2)	Abner (yellow card) 22'; Šulc (yellow card) 80', (goal) 87'	Report	Egan-Riley (red card) 29'; Gomes (yellow card) 41'; Murillo (yellow card) 90+4'	Stadium: Parc Olympique Lyonnais; Attendance: 52,095; Referee: François Letexier

14 September 2025 4	Rennes	3–1	Lyon	Rennes
20:45 CEST (UTC+2)	Frankowski (yellow card) 26'; Seidu (yellow card) 47'; Rouault 80'; Descamps 90+3' (o.g.); Meïté 90+5'	Report	Tolisso 14', (yellow card) 43'; Mata (yellow card) 53'; Morton (red card) 75'	Stadium: Roazhon Park; Attendance: 27,392; Referee: Ruddy Buquet

19 September 2025 5	Lyon	1–0	Angers	Décines-Charpieu
20:45 CEST (UTC+2)	Niakhaté (yellow card) 22'; Merah (yellow card) 53'; Tessmann 65'	Report	Lefort (yellow card) 20'; Arcus (yellow card) 37'	Stadium: Parc Olympique Lyonnais; Attendance: 44,437; Referee: Clément Turpin

28 September 2025 6	Lille	0–1	Lyon	Villeneuve-d'Ascq
17:15 CEST (UTC+2)	Bouaddi (yellow card) 43'; Mandi (yellow card) 69'; Fernandez-Pardo (yellow card) 86'; Igamane (yellow card) 87'	Report	Morton 13'; Tagliafico (yellow card) 46'; Fofana (yellow card) 72'; Moreira (yellow card) 76'; Šulc (yellow card) 83'	Stadium: Stade Pierre-Mauroy; Attendance: 45,287; Referee: Mathieu Vernice

5 October 2025 7	Lyon	1–2	Toulouse	Décines-Charpieu
15:00 CEST (UTC+2)	Fofana 24'; Moreira (yellow card) 90+4'	Report	Francis (yellow card) 51'; Dønnum (yellow card) 59'; McKenzie (yellow card) 80'; Mata 87' (o.g.); Emersonn 90+6'	Stadium: Parc Olympique Lyonnais; Attendance: 51,414; Referee: Thomas Léonard

18 October 2025 8	Nice	3–2	Lyon	Nice
17:00 CEST (UTC+2)	Bard 5'; Diop 35'; Boudaoui 55'; Vanhoutte (yellow card) 64'	Report	Mata (yellow card) 26'; Šulc 29', 90+5'; Maitland-Niles (penalty missed) 53'; Niakhaté (yellow card) 90+6'	Stadium: Allianz Riviera; Attendance: 24,122; Referee: Jérôme Brisard

26 October 2025 9	Lyon	2–1	Strasbourg	Décines-Charpieu
20:45 CET (UTC+1)	Doukouré 31' (o.g.); Tolisso (penalty missed) 43'; Moreira 90+1'	Report	Panichelli 25'; Moreira (yellow card) 61'; Doukouré (red card) 67'; Sarr (yellow card) 68'; Doué (yellow card) 80'; Lemaréchal (yellow card) 90+6'	Stadium: Parc Olympique Lyonnais; Attendance: 49,058; Referee: Eric Wattellier

29 October 2025 10	Paris FC	3–3	Lyon	Paris
21:05 CET (UTC+1)	Chergui (yellow card) 25'; Camara (yellow card) 32', (goal) 65'; De Smet (yellow card) 35' (yellow-red card) 67'; Lees-Melou (yellow card) 73'; Kebbal 77'; Marchetti 84'; Mbow (yellow card) 90+7'	Report	Tolisso 5'; Karabec (yellow card) 45+1'; Šulc 51', 58'; De Carvalho (yellow card) 55'; Abner (red card) 61'	Stadium: Stade Jean-Bouin; Attendance: 18,445; Referee: Jérémy Stinat

2 November 2025 11	Brest	0–0	Lyon	Brest
20:45 CET (UTC+1)	Mboup (yellow card) 63'	Report	Hateboer (red card) 8'	Stadium: Stade Francis-Le Blé; Attendance: 14,534; Referee: Clément Turpin

9 November 2025 12	Lyon	2–3	Paris Saint-Germain	Décines-Charpieu
20:45 CET (UTC+1)	Moreira 30'; Mata (yellow card) 44'; Maitland-Niles 50'; Morton (yellow card) 57'; Tagliafico (yellow card) 57' (yellow-red card) 90+3'; Tolisso (yellow card) 90+3'; Satriano (yellow card) 90+6'	Report	Zaïre-Emery 26'; Kvaratskhelia 33'; Mayulu (yellow card) 45+1'; Neves 90+5'; Ramos (yellow card) 90+6'	Stadium: Parc Olympique Lyonnais; Attendance: 58,257; Referee: Benoît Bastien

23 November 2025 13	Auxerre	0–0	Lyon	Auxerre
15:00 CET (UTC+1)	Sinayoko (penalty missed) 25'; Mensah (yellow card) 28'	Report	Merah (yellow card) 20'; Tolisso (yellow card) 67'; Maitland-Niles (yellow card) 87'	Stadium: Stade de l'Abbé-Deschamps; Attendance: 17,359; Referee: Thomas Léonard

30 November 2025 14	Lyon	3–0	Nantes	Décines-Charpieu
20:45 CET (UTC+1)	Abner 51'; Morton (yellow card) 57'; Satriano 70', 77'	Report	Tati (yellow card) 22'; Mwanga (red card) 43'; Lepenant (yellow card) 88'	Stadium: Parc Olympique Lyonnais; Attendance: 46,449; Referee: Abdelatif Kherradji

7 December 2025 15	Lorient	1–0	Lyon	Lorient
20:45 CET (UTC+1)	Pagis 39'; Soumano (yellow card) 57'; Abergel (yellow card) 66'	Report	Maitland-Niles (yellow card) 37' (yellow-red card) 42'	Stadium: Stade du Moustoir; Attendance: 16,213; Referee: Mathieu Vernice

14 December 2025 16	Lyon	1–0	Le Havre	Décines-Charpieu
15:00 CET (UTC+1)	Morton (yellow card) 37'; Šulc 52'; Niakhaté (yellow card) 74'	Report	Négo (yellow card) 24'; Soumaré (penalty missed) 38'; Ndiaye (yellow card) 68'; Seko (yellow card) 71'; Namli (yellow card) 71'	Stadium: Parc Olympique Lyonnais; Attendance: 42,168; Referee: Marc Bollengier

3 January 2026 17	Monaco	1–3	Lyon	Monaco
17:00 CET (UTC+1)	Kehrer (yellow card) 7'; Coulibaly 45+4', (red card) 70'; Balogun (yellow card) 78'	Report	Mata (yellow card) 35'; Šulc 38', 57'; Kluivert (yellow card) 70'; Tolisso (yellow card) 70'; Abner 79'	Stadium: Stade Louis II; Attendance: 11,828; Referee: Jérôme Brisard

18 January 2026 18	Lyon	2–1	Brest	Décines-Charpieu
20:45 CET (UTC+1)	Šulc 41'; Abner 45+2', (yellow card) 86'; Maitland-Niles (yellow card) 47'	Report	Del Castillo (red card) 19'; Dina Ebimbe 87'	Stadium: Parc Olympique Lyonnais; Attendance: 46,046; Referee: Romain Lissorgue

25 January 2026 19	Metz	2–5	Lyon	Metz
17:15 CET (UTC+1)	Kouao 34', (yellow card) 72'; Diallo 64'	Report	Endrick 11', 45+1', 87' (pen.); Kluivert 16'; Morton 32'	Stadium: Stade Saint-Symphorien; Attendance: 28,244; Referee: Eric Wattellier

1 February 2026 20	Lyon	1–0	Lille	Décines-Charpieu
15:00 CET (UTC+1)	Nartey 37'; Maitland-Niles (yellow card) 90'	Report	Mandi (yellow card) 42'; Ngoy (yellow card) 46'; Mukau (yellow card) 61'; Fernandez-Pardo (yellow card) 85'	Stadium: Parc Olympique Lyonnais; Attendance: 56,150; Referee: François Letexier

7 February 2026 21	Nantes	0–1	Lyon	Nantes
21:05 CET (UTC+1)	Amian (yellow card) 37'; Youssef (yellow card) 66'; Kaba (yellow card) 82'; Abline (yellow card) 90+8'	Report	Endrick (yellow card) 2', (red card) 61'; Šulc 25'; Greif (yellow card) 76'	Stadium: Stade de la Beaujoire; Attendance: 30,849; Referee: Mathieu Vernice

15 February 2026 22	Lyon	2–0	Nice	Décines-Charpieu
20:45 CET (UTC+1)	Tolisso 45+1'; Maitland-Niles (yellow card) 45+4'; Tessmann (yellow card) 52'; Nartey 64'; Abner (yellow card) 87'	Report	Sanson (yellow card) 21'	Stadium: Parc Olympique Lyonnais; Attendance: 48,618; Referee: Thomas Léonard

22 February 2026 23	Strasbourg	3–1	Lyon	Strasbourg
20:45 CET (UTC+1)	Godo 37'; Moreira 52'; Omobamidele (yellow card) 57'; Panichelli 83' (pen.)	Report	Kluivert (yellow card) 57'; Tolisso 59'; Endrick (yellow card) 60'	Stadium: Stade de la Meinau; Attendance: 29,000; Referee: Ruddy Buquet

1 March 2026 24	Marseille	3–2	Lyon	Marseille
20:45 CET (UTC+1)	Paixão 52'; Kondogbia (yellow card) 74'; Aubameyang 81', 90+1'; Aguerd (yellow card) 83'; Abdelli (yellow card) 90+8'	Report	Tolisso 3'; Mata (yellow card) 30'; Morton (yellow card) 45+1'; Himbert 76'	Stadium: Stade Vélodrome; Attendance: 66,225; Referee: Jérôme Brisard

8 March 2026 25	Lyon	1–1	Paris FC	Décines-Charpieu
20:45 CET (UTC+1)	Morton (yellow card) 27'; Tagliafico (yellow card) 50'; Tolisso 90+6' (pen.)	Report	Munetsi 63'	Stadium: Parc Olympique Lyonnais; Attendance: 42,148; Referee: Eric Wattellier

15 March 2026 26	Le Havre	0–0	Lyon	Le Havre
17:15 CET (UTC+1)	Zagadou (red card) 55'; Diaw (yellow card) 88'	Report	Karabec (yellow card) 42'; Tagliafico (yellow card) 42'; Tessmann (yellow card) 83'	Stadium: Stade Océane; Attendance: 22,264; Referee: Jérémy Stinat

22 March 2026 27	Lyon	1–2	Monaco	Décines-Charpieu
15:00 CET (UTC+1)	Šulc 42'; Tagliafico (red card) 89'	Report	Golovin (yellow card) 39'; Faes (yellow card) 53'; Akliouche 62'; Balogun 72' (pen.); Diatta (yellow card) 86'	Stadium: Parc Olympique Lyonnais; Attendance: 56,039; Referee: François Letexier

5 April 2026 28	Angers	0–0	Lyon	Angers
15:00 CEST (UTC+2)	Belkhdim (yellow card) 46'; Van den Boomen (yellow card) 66'; Raolisoa (yellow card) 84'	Report		Stadium: Stade Raymond Kopa; Attendance: 14,674; Referee: Ruddy Buquet

12 April 2026 29	Lyon	2–0	Lorient	Décines-Charpieu
20:45 CEST (UTC+2)	Maitland-Niles (yellow card) 45+1'; Yaremchuk 49'; Tolisso 56'; Morton (yellow card) 81'; Endrick (yellow card) 81'; Moreira (yellow card) 90+1'	Report	Meïté (yellow card) 88'	Stadium: Parc Olympique Lyonnais; Attendance: 43,551; Referee: Benoît Bastien

19 April 2026 30	Paris Saint-Germain	1–2	Lyon	Paris
20:45 CEST (UTC+2)	Zabarnyi (yellow card) 30'; Beraldo (yellow card) 30'; Ramos (penalty missed) 33'; Lee (yellow card) 65'; Hernandez (yellow card) 68'; Kvaratskhelia 90+4'; Fabián (yellow card) 90+4'	Report	Endrick 6'; Kluivert (yellow card) 13'; Moreira 18'	Stadium: Parc des Princes; Attendance: 47,926; Referee: Jérôme Brisard

25 April 2026 31	Lyon	3–2	Auxerre	Décines-Charpieu
17:00 CEST (UTC+2)	Yaremchuk 19', 71'; Tolisso 66'; Kluivert (yellow card) 89'	Report	Diomandé 35'; Namaso (yellow card) 52'; Mensah (yellow card) 84'; Okoh 88'	Stadium: Parc Olympique Lyonnais; Attendance: 51,440; Referee: Ruddy Buquet

3 May 2026 32	Lyon	4–2	Rennes	Décines-Charpieu
20:45 CEST (UTC+2)	Yaremchuk 37'; Tolisso 42' (pen.); Moreira 52'; Endrick 75'	Report	Al-Taamari 6'; Lepaul (yellow card) 23', (goal) 48'; Samba (yellow card) 40'; Merlin (yellow card) 82'	Stadium: Parc Olympique Lyonnais; Attendance: 51,460; Referee: Clément Turpin

10 May 2026 33	Toulouse	2–1	Lyon	Toulouse
21:00 CEST (UTC+2)	Methalie 10', (yellow card) 44'; Dønnum (yellow card) 26' (yellow-red card) 79'; Vossah (yellow card) 45+1'; McKenzie (yellow card) 46'; Cresswell (yellow card) 57'; Kamanzi 78'	Report	Endrick (yellow card) 56'; Yaremchuk (yellow card) 70'; Tolisso 71'	Stadium: Stade de Toulouse; Attendance: 26,683; Referee: Bastien Dechepy

17 May 2026 34	Lyon	0–4	Lens	Décines-Charpieu
21:00 CEST (UTC+2)	Šulc (yellow card) 63'	Report	Sarr (yellow card) 5'; Saïd 20', 32'; Abdulhamid (yellow card) 27'; Sotoca 45+1'; Thauvin 53'; Aguilar (yellow card) 73'; Čelik (yellow card) 83'	Stadium: Parc Olympique Lyonnais; Attendance: 58,227; Referee: François Letexier

=== Coupe de France ===
21 December 2025 Round of 64	Lyon	3–0	Saint-Cyr Collonges	Décines-Charpieu
21:00 CET (UTC+1)	Abner 52'; Šulc 85', 90'	Report	Hebert (yellow card) 25'; Mombouly (yellow card) 51'	Stadium: Parc Olympique Lyonnais; Attendance: 28,067; Referee: Jérémie Pignard

11 January 2026 Round of 32	Lille	1–2	Lyon	Villeneuve-d'Ascq
21:00 CET (UTC+1)	Ngoy 28'; Haraldsson (yellow card) 37'; Perraud (yellow card) 64'	Report	Moreira 1'; Šulc (yellow card) 31'; Morton (yellow card) 32'; Endrick 42'; Descamps (yellow card) 90+1'	Stadium: Stade Pierre-Mauroy; Attendance: 20,333; Referee: Clément Turpin

4 February 2026 Round of 16	Lyon	2–0	Laval	Décines-Charpieu
20:30 CET (UTC+1)	Endrick (yellow card) 48', (goal) 80'; Moreira (yellow card) 88', (goal) 90+4'	Report	Mbayo (yellow card) 31'; Commaret (yellow card) 88'	Stadium: Parc Olympique Lyonnais; Attendance: 24,678; Referee: Ruddy Buquet

5 March 2026 Quarter-finals	Lyon	2–2 (4–5 p)	Lens	Décines-Charpieu
21:10 CET (UTC+1)	Tagliafico (yellow card) 45+3'; Yaremchuk 67'; Himbert 90+4'	Report	Thauvin 23'; Sima 45+1'; Édouard (yellow card) 45+3'; Udol (yellow card) 54'; Masuaku (red card) 64'; Čelik (yellow card) 78'	Stadium: Parc Olympique Lyonnais; Attendance: 47,879; Referee: Benoît Bastien
	Penalties
	Karabec (penalty scored); Tolisso (penalty scored); Morton (penalty scored); Niakhaté (penalty missed); Endrick (penalty scored)		(penalty scored) Fofana; (penalty scored) Abdulhamid; (penalty scored) Udol; (penalty scored) Sangaré; (penalty scored) Thauvin

=== UEFA Europa League ===
==== League phase ====
The draw for the league phase was held on 29 August 2025.

Pos	Team	Pld	W	D	L	GF	GA	GD	Pts	Qualification
1	(French Football Federation) Lyon	8	7	0	1	18	5	+13	21	Advance to round of 16 (seeded)
2	(The Football Association) Aston Villa	8	7	0	1	14	6	+8	21	Advance to round of 16 (seeded)
3	(Danish Football Association) Midtjylland	8	6	1	1	18	8	+10	19	Advance to round of 16 (seeded)
4	(Royal Spanish Football Federation) Real Betis	8	5	2	1	13	7	+6	17 (Note: Away goals scored: Real Betis 5, Porto 3.)	Advance to round of 16 (seeded)
5	(Portuguese Football Federation) Porto	8	5	2	1	13	7	+6	17	Advance to round of 16 (seeded)

Source: UEFA
Rules for classification: League phase tiebreakers
Notes:

Round	1	2	3	4	5	6	7	8
Ground	A	H	H	A	A	H	A	H
Result	W	W	W	L	W	W	W	W
Position	9	5	3	7	1	1	1	1

Source: UEFA
A = Away; H = Home; W = Win; D = Draw; L = Loss

25 September 2025 1	Utrecht (Netherlands)	0–1	(France) Lyon	Utrecht, Netherlands
21:00 CEST (UTC+2)	Engwanda (yellow card) 84'; El Karouani (yellow card) 90+5'	Report	Šulc (yellow card) 57'; Mata (yellow card) 67'; Tessmann 75', (yellow card) 75'; Maitland-Niles (yellow card) 80'	Stadium: Stadion Galgenwaard; Attendance: 22,083; Referee: Horațiu Feșnic (Romania)

2 October 2025 2	Lyon (France)	2–0	(Austria) Red Bull Salzburg	Décines-Charpieu, France
21:00 CEST (UTC+2)	Šulc (penalty missed) 7'; Satriano 11'; Kluivert 57', (yellow card) 90'	Report	Diambou (yellow card) 51'	Stadium: Parc Olympique Lyonnais; Attendance: 31,767; Referee: Andris Treimanis (Latvia)

23 October 2025 3	Lyon (France)	2–0	(Switzerland) Basel	Décines-Charpieu, France
18:45 CET (UTC+1)	Tolisso 3'; Niakhaté (yellow card) 89'; Moreira 90'	Report	Vouilloz (yellow card) 45+3'	Stadium: Parc Olympique Lyonnais; Attendance: 35,860; Referee: Manfredas Lukjančukas (Lithuania)

6 November 2025 4	Real Betis (Spain)	2–0	(France) Lyon	Seville, Spain
21:00 CET (UTC+1)	Ezzalzouli 30'; Antony 35'; Bakambu (yellow card) 70'; Ruibal (yellow card) 90+3'	Report	Abner (yellow card) 24'; Tagliafico (yellow card) 90'; Moreira (yellow card) 90+1'	Stadium: La Cartuja; Attendance: 55,836; Referee: Matej Jug (Slovenia)
Note: The match was played at La Cartuja in Seville, instead of Real Betis' regular stadium, Benito Villamarín, due to renovation works.

27 November 2025 5	Maccabi Tel Aviv (Israel)	0–6	(France) Lyon	Bačka Topola, Serbia
21:00 CET (UTC+1)	Davida (yellow card) 27'; Asante (yellow card) 31'; Yehezkel (yellow card) 34' (yellow-red card) 90+1'; Noy (yellow card) 69'	Report	Abner 4'; Tolisso 25', 51', 53'; Niakhaté 35' (pen.); Karabec 62'; Barišić (yellow card) 79'; Gomes Rodríguez (yellow card) 86'	Stadium: TSC Arena; Attendance: 320; Referee: Kristo Tohver (Estonia)
Note: Due to the Gaza war, Israeli teams were required to play their home matches at neutral venues until further notice.

11 December 2025 6	Lyon (France)	2–1	(Netherlands) Go Ahead Eagles	Décines-Charpieu, France
21:00 CET (UTC+1)	Moreira 3'; Šulc 11'; Mata (yellow card) 33'	Report	Smit 6'; Stokkers (yellow card) 86'; Meulensteen (yellow card) 90+5'	Stadium: Parc Olympique Lyonnais; Attendance: 26,403; Referee: Juxhin Xhaja (Albania)

22 January 2026 7	Young Boys (Switzerland)	0–1	(France) Lyon	Bern, Switzerland
18:45 CET (UTC+1)	Raveloson (yellow card) 83'; Benito (yellow card) 90+2'; Lauper (yellow card) 90+2'	Report	Maitland-Niles 45+1'; Kluivert (yellow card) 82'; Morton (yellow card) 83'; De Carvalho (yellow card) 90+5'	Stadium: Stadion Wankdorf; Attendance: 22,746; Referee: Aliyar Aghayev (Azerbaijan)

29 January 2026 8	Lyon (France)	4–2	(Greece) PAOK	Décines-Charpieu, France
21:00 CET (UTC+1)	Himbert 34'; Morton (yellow card) 45+1'; Merah 55'; Karabec (penalty missed) 83', 88'; Gomes Rodríguez 90+3'	Report	Giakoumakis 20', (yellow card) 77'; Konstantelias (yellow card) 36' (yellow-red card) 41'; Meïté 66'	Stadium: Parc Olympique Lyonnais; Attendance: 26,149; Referee: Ricardo de Burgos Bengoetxea (Spain)

==== Knockout phase ====
===== Round of 16 =====
The draw for the round of 16 took place on 27 February 2026.

12 March 2026 First leg	Celta Vigo (Spain)	1–1	(France) Lyon	Vigo, Spain
21:00 CET (UTC+1)	Iglesias (yellow card) 20' (yellow-red card) 55'; Rueda 25'; Mingueza (yellow card) 48'; Alonso (yellow card) 90+3'; Vecino (yellow card) 90+3'	Report	Tagliafico (yellow card) 53'; Kango (yellow card) 77'; Endrick 87'	Stadium: Balaídos; Attendance: 21,673; Referee: Erik Lambrechts (Belgium)

19 March 2026 Second leg	Lyon (France)	0–2 (1–3 agg.)	(Spain) Celta Vigo	Décines-Charpieu, France
18:45 CET (UTC+1)	Niakhaté (red card) 19'; Tagliafico (yellow card) 82' (yellow-red card) 90+6'	Report	Swedberg (yellow card) 33'; Starfelt (yellow card) 43'; López (yellow card) 53'; Rueda 61', (yellow card) 89'; Rodríguez (yellow card) 83'; Jutglà 90+2'	Stadium: Parc Olympique Lyonnais; Attendance: 41,764; Referee: Irfan Peljto (Bosnia and Herzegovina)

== Statistics ==
=== Appearances and goals ===
No.	Pos	Nat	Player	Total		Ligue 1		Coupe de France		UEFA Europa League	
No.	Pos	Nat	Player	Apps	Goals	Apps	Goals	Apps	Goals	Apps	Goals
Goalkeepers
1	GK	(Slovakia) SVK	Dominik Greif	35	0	29	0	0	0	6	0
40	GK	(France) FRA	Rémy Descamps	13	0	5	0	4	0	4	0
50	GK	(Mali) MLI	Lassine Diarra	0	0	0	0	0	0	0	0
Defenders
3	DF	(Argentina) ARG	Nicolás Tagliafico	30	0	14+6	0	2	0	7+1	0
16	DF	(Brazil) BRA	Abner	36	5	25+1	3	3	1	5+2	1
19	DF	(Senegal) SEN	Moussa Niakhaté	43	1	30+2	0	2	0	9	1
21	DF	(Netherlands) NED	Ruben Kluivert	24	2	9+7	1	2	0	5+1	1
22	DF	(Angola) ANG	Clinton Mata	44	0	32	0	3	0	8+1	0
33	DF	(Netherlands) NED	Hans Hateboer	18	0	8+7	0	2+1	0	0	0
38	DF	(France) FRA	Steeve Kango	6	0	1+3	0	0	0	2	0
85	DF	(France) FRA	Noham Kamara	2	0	0+2	0	0	0	0	0
98	DF	(England) ENG	Ainsley Maitland-Niles	42	2	28+2	1	3+1	0	6+2	1
Midfielders
5	MF	(Belgium) BEL	Orel Mangala	14	0	5+4	0	0+2	0	0+3	0
6	MF	(United States) USA	Tanner Tessmann	41	2	22+7	1	1+2	0	5+4	1
8	MF	(France) FRA	Corentin Tolisso	39	15	26+4	11	2	0	6+1	4
10	MF	(Czech Republic) CZE	Pavel Šulc	38	14	17+10	11	2+1	2	5+3	1
23	MF	(England) ENG	Tyler Morton	43	2	29	2	4	0	7+3	0
39	MF	(Portugal) POR	Mathys De Carvalho	20	0	3+8	0	1	0	6+2	0
44	MF	(France) FRA	Khalis Merah	32	1	15+7	0	2	0	5+3	1
46	MF	(Portugal) POR	Tiago Gonçalves	3	0	0	0	0	0	0+3	0
99	MF	(Denmark) DEN	Noah Nartey	15	2	4+7	2	2	0	2	0
Forwards
7	FW	(Czech Republic) CZE	Adam Karabec	34	3	11+10	1	2+2	0	5+4	2
9	FW	(Brazil) BRA	Endrick	21	8	14+2	5	3	2	2	1
11	FW	(Belgium) BEL	Malick Fofana	16	2	9+3	2	0	0	2+2	0
17	FW	(Portugal) POR	Afonso Moreira	37	8	18+9	4	2+1	2	3+4	2
18	FW	(Algeria) ALG	Rachid Ghezzal	12	0	2+8	0	0+1	0	0+1	0
34	FW	(France) FRA	Adil Hamdani	7	0	0+4	0	0+1	0	0+2	0
37	FW	(Ghana) GHA	Ernest Nuamah	3	0	0+3	0	0	0	0	0
45	FW	(France) FRA	Rémi Himbert	11	3	1+5	1	0+2	1	1+2	1
77	FW	(Ukraine) UKR	Roman Yaremchuk	14	5	5+6	4	1	1	2	0
Players transferred/loaned out during the season
20	DF	(France) FRA	Saël Kumbedi	1	0	1	0	0	0	0	0
20	FW	(Uruguay) URU	Martín Satriano	19	3	8+3	2	1+1	0	6	1
29	FW	(France) FRA	Enzo Molebe	3	0	0+1	0	0	0	1+1	0
32	FW	(England) ENG	Alejandro Gomes Rodríguez	4	1	0	0	0+1	0	0+3	1
41	DF	(Croatia) CRO	Téo Barisic	1	0	0	0	0	0	0+1	0
69	FW	(Georgia (country)) GEO	Georges Mikautadze	2	1	2	1	0	0	0	0

Source: Competitions

=== Goalscorers ===
Rank	No.	Pos.	Nat.	Player	Ligue 1	Coupe de France	UEFA Europa League	Total
1	8	MF	(France)	Corentin Tolisso	11	0	4	15
2	10	MF	(Czech Republic)	Pavel Šulc	11	2	1	14
3	9	FW	(Brazil)	Endrick	5	2	1	8
3	17	FW	(Portugal)	Afonso Moreira	4	2	2	8
5	16	DF	(Brazil)	Abner	3	1	1	5
5	77	FW	(Ukraine)	Roman Yaremchuk	4	1	0	5
7	20	FW	(Uruguay)	Martín Satriano	2	0	1	3
7	7	FW	(Czech Republic)	Adam Karabec	1	0	2	3
7	45	FW	(France)	Rémi Himbert	1	1	1	3
10	6	MF	(United States)	Tanner Tessmann	1	0	1	2
10	11	FW	(Belgium)	Malick Fofana	2	0	0	2
10	98	DF	(England)	Ainsley Maitland-Niles	1	0	1	2
10	23	MF	(England)	Tyler Morton	2	0	0	2
10	21	DF	(Netherlands)	Ruben Kluivert	1	0	1	2
10	99	MF	(Denmark)	Noah Nartey	2	0	0	2
16	69	FW	(Georgia (country))	Georges Mikautadze	1	0	0	1
16	19	DF	(Senegal)	Moussa Niakhaté	0	0	1	1
16	44	MF	(France)	Khalis Merah	0	0	1	1
16	32	FW	(England)	Alejandro Gomes Rodríguez	0	0	1	1
Own goals					1	0	0	1
Totals					53	9	19	81

=== Clean sheets ===
Rank	No.	Pos.	Nat.	Player	Ligue 1	Coupe de France	UEFA Europa League	Total
1	1	GK	(Slovakia)	Dominik Greif	11	0	3	14
2	40	GK	(France)	Rémy Descamps	4	2	2	8
Totals					15	2	5	22
