= Teo Barišić =

Croatian-French footballer (born 2004)

Personal information
- Date of birth: 30 September 2004 (age 22)
- Place of birth: Viriat, France
- Height: 1.85 m (6 ft 1 in)
- Position: Right-back

Team information
- Current team: Rijeka
- Number: 28

Youth career
- 2017–2022: Lyon

Senior career*
Years	Team	Apps	(Gls)
2022–2026	Lyon II	63	(1)
2025–2026	Lyon	1	(0)
2026–	Rijeka	6	(0)

International career^{‡}
2022	Croatia U18	1	(0)
2025–	Croatia U21	7	(0)
- * Club domestic league appearances and goals as of 8 April 2026 ‡ National team caps and goals as of 15 December 2025

Teo Barišić (born 30 September 2004) is a professional footballer who plays as a right-back for Croatian Football League club Rijeka. Born in France, he represented Croatia at youth level.

== Club career ==
Born in Viriat, Barišić was a youth product of Lyon. His family is from Zenica, Bosnia and Herzegovina. On 25 June 2024, he signed his first professional contract with the team. He then became the captain of Lyon's reserves team for the 2024–25 season.

On 17 May 2025, Barišić made his debut with Lyon's first team in a 2–0 win against Angers during the last matchday of the 2024–25 Ligue 1. He thus became the 600th player to appear for Lyon.

On 14 January 2026, Barišić signed a four-and-a-half-year contract with Rijeka. On 8 April, he had suffered a rupture of the anterior cruciate ligament in his right knee, ruling him out for several months.

== International career ==
Eligible to represent Bosnia and Herzegovina, Croatia and France, Barišić chose to play for Croatia at youth level.

== Career statistics ==
As of match played 8 April 2026

Appearances and goals by club, season and competition
Club	Season	League			Cup		Europe		Other		Total	
Club	Season	Division	Apps	Goals	Apps	Goals	Apps	Goals	Apps	Goals	Apps	Goals
Lyon II	2021–22	Championnat National 2	3	0	—		—		—		3	0
Lyon II	2023–24	Championnat National 2	19	0	—		—		—		19	0
Lyon II	2023–24	Championnat National 3	16	0	—		—		2 (Note: Appearance(s) in Premier League International Cup)	0	18	0
Lyon II	2024–25	Championnat National 3	22	0	—		—		6	0	28	0
Lyon II	2025–26	Championnat National 3	3	1	—		—		—		3	1
Lyon II	Total		63	1	—		—		8	0	71	1
Lyon	2024–25	Ligue 1	1	0	0	0	0	0	—		1	0
Lyon	2025–26	Ligue 1	0	0	0	0	1 (Note: Appearance in UEFA Europa League)	0	—		1	0
Lyon	Total		1	0	0	0	1	0	0	0	2	0
Rijeka	2025–26	Croatian Football League	6	0	1	0	2 (Note: Appearance in UEFA Conference League)	0	—		9	0
Career total			70	1	1	0	3	0	8	0	82	1
