= Mathys De Carvalho =

French footballer (born 2005)

Personal information
- Full name: Mathys De Carvalho Soares
- Date of birth: 1 May 2005 (age 21)
- Place of birth: Lyon, France
- Height: 1.83 m (6 ft 0 in)
- Position: Defensive midfielder

Team information
- Current team: Diriyah

Youth career
- 2010–2025: Lyon

Senior career*
Years	Team	Apps	(Gls)
2023–2026	Lyon B	55	(4)
2025–2026	Lyon	12	(0)
2026–	Diriyah	0	(0)

International career^{‡}
2025–	Portugal U20	10	(1)
- * Club domestic league appearances and goals as of 29 August 2026 ‡ National team caps and goals as of 13 June 2026

Mathys De Carvalho Soares (born 1 May 2005) is a professional footballer who plays as a defensive midfielder for Saudi Pro League club Diriyah. Born in France, he represents Portugal at youth level.

== Club career ==
A native of Lyon, De Carvalho was formed at the Olympique Lyonnais youth academy.

On 11 July 2025, De Carvalho signed his first professional contract with Lyon for a duration of 3 years, until June 2028. Following this signature, he was promoted to Lyon's first team by coach Paulo Fonseca. He made his debut for Lyon on 19 September 2025 in a 1–0 home win against Angers in Ligue 1, coming in as a substitute in the 81st minute. A few days later, on 25 September 2025, De Carvalho started his first game for Lyon in a 1–0 victory over Utrecht in the UEFA Europa League league phase.

On 7 September 2026, De Carvalho moved to Diriyah in Saudi Arabia, for a €1.1 million transfer fee, with a 10% sell-on clause.

== International career ==
Eligible to play for France and Portugal, De Carvalho opted to represent Portugal at international level. He made his debut for Portugal under-20s in October 2025.

== Personal life ==
De Carvalho is of Portuguese descent.

== Career statistics ==
As of match played 29 August 2026

Appearances and goals by club, season and competition
Club	Season	League			Cup		Continental		Other		Total	
Club	Season	Division	Apps	Goals	Apps	Goals	Apps	Goals	Apps	Goals	Apps	Goals
Lyon B	2023–24	Championnat National 3	15	0	—		—		4 (Note: Appearance(s) in Premier League International Cup)	0	18	0
Lyon B	2024–25	Championnat National 3	22	3	—		—		7	1	29	4
Lyon B	2025–26	Championnat National 3	6	0	—		—		—		6	0
Lyon B	2026–27	Championnat National 2	1	0	—		—		—		1	0
Lyon B	Total		44	3	—		—		11	1	55	4
Lyon	2024–25	Ligue 1	0	0	—		0	0	—		0	0
Lyon	2025–26	Ligue 1	11	0	1	0	8 (Note: Appearances in UEFA Europa League)	0	—		20	0
Lyon	2026–27	Ligue 1	1	0	0	0	1 (Note: Appearances in UEFA Champions League)	0	—		2	0
Lyon	Total		12	0	1	0	9	0	0	0	22	0
Career total			56	3	1	0	9	0	11	1	77	4
