= Kaïl Boudache =

French footballer (born 2006)

Personal information
- Date of birth: 15 June 2006 (age 20)
- Place of birth: Alès, France
- Height: 1.75 m (5 ft 9 in)
- Position: Winger

Team information
- Current team: Lyon
- Number: 26

Youth career
- 2011–2022: Olympique Alès
- 2022–2023: Nice

Senior career*
Years	Team	Apps	(Gls)
2023–2026	Nice II	2	(0)
2026	Nice	13	(1)
2026–	Lyon	7	(0)

International career^{‡}
2023	France U17	1	(0)
2026–	Algeria U23	4	(0)
- * Club domestic league appearances and goals as of 22:30, 18 October 2026 (UTC) ‡ National team caps and goals as of 4 October 2026

Kaïl Boudache (born 15 June 2006) is a professional footballer who plays as a winger for Ligue 1 club Lyon. Born in France, he represents Algeria at youth level.

== Club career ==
Boudache is a product of the youth academies of the French clubs Olympique Alès and Nice. He made his senior and professional debut with Nice as a substitute in a 3–1 UEFA Europa League win over Go Ahead Eagles on 22 January 2026.

== International career ==
Born in France, Boudache is of Algerian descent. In 2023, he made a friendly appearance with the France U17s.

== Personal life ==
Boudache's brother Ilian Boudache is also a footballer in France.

== Career statistics ==
=== Club ===
As of match played 18 October 2026

Appearances and goals by club, season and competition
Club	Season	League			Cup		Europe		Other		Total	
Club	Season	Division	Apps	Goals	Apps	Goals	Apps	Goals	Apps	Goals	Apps	Goals
Nice II	2022–23	National 1	2	0	—		—		—		2	0
Nice	2025–26	Ligue 1	13	1	4	1	2 (Note: Appearances in UEFA Europa League)	0	1 (Note: Appearance in Ligue 1 relegation/promotion play-offs)	1	20	3
Lyon	2026–27	Ligue 1	7	0	0	0	4 (Note: Two appearances in UEFA Champions League, two appearances in UEFA Europa League)	0	—		11	0
Career total			22	1	4	1	6	0	1	1	33	3

== Honours ==
Nice

- Coupe de France runner-up: 2025–26
