= Tiago Gonçalves (footballer, born 2007) =

English footballer

Personal information
- Full name: Tiago Manuel Gonçalves Silva
- Date of birth: 18 February 2007 (age 19)
- Place of birth: Bourgoin-Jallieu, France
- Height: 1.76 m (5 ft 9 in)
- Position: Midfielder

Team information
- Current team: Lyon
- Number: 46

Youth career
- 2017–2018: Bourgoin-Jallieu
- 2018–2025: Lyon

Senior career*
Years	Team	Apps	(Gls)
2025–	Lyon B	23	(5)
2025–	Lyon	0	(0)

International career^{‡}
2024	Portugal U18	2	(0)
2026–	Portugal U20	3	(0)
- * Club domestic league appearances and goals as of 8 November 2026 ‡ National team caps and goals as of 3 October 2026

Tiago Manuel Gonçalves Silva (born 18 February 2007) is a professional footballer who plays as a midfielder for Lyon. Born in France, he is a youth international for Portugal.

== Club career ==
A youth product of Bourgoin-Jallieu, Gonçalves joined the youth academy of Lyon in 2018. On 27 June 2023, he signed an aspiring contract with Lyon for 2 seasons. On 13 May 2025, he signed a stagiary contract with Lyon and was promoted to their reserves in the Championnat National 3. On 27 November 2025, he debuted with the senior Lyon team in a 6–0 UEFA Europa League win against Maccabi Tel Aviv as a substitute.

== International career ==
Born in France, Gonçalves is of Portuguese descent and holds dual French and Portuguese citizenship. In September 2024, he was called up to the Portugal U18s for the Tournoi de Limoges.

== Career statistics ==
As of match played 8 November 2026

Appearances and goals by club, season and competition
Club	Season	League			Cup		Europe		Other		Total	
Club	Season	Division	Apps	Goals	Apps	Goals	Apps	Goals	Apps	Goals	Apps	Goals
Lyon B	2025–26	Championnat National 3	17	4	—		—		—		17	4
Lyon B	2026–27	Championnat National 2	6	1	—		—		—		6	1
Lyon B	Total		23	5	—		—		—		23	5
Lyon	2025–26	Ligue 1	0	0	0	0	3 (Note: Appearances in UEFA Europa League)	0	—		3	0
Career total			23	5	0	0	3	0	0	0	26	5
