= Lassine Diarra =

Malian footballer (born 2002)

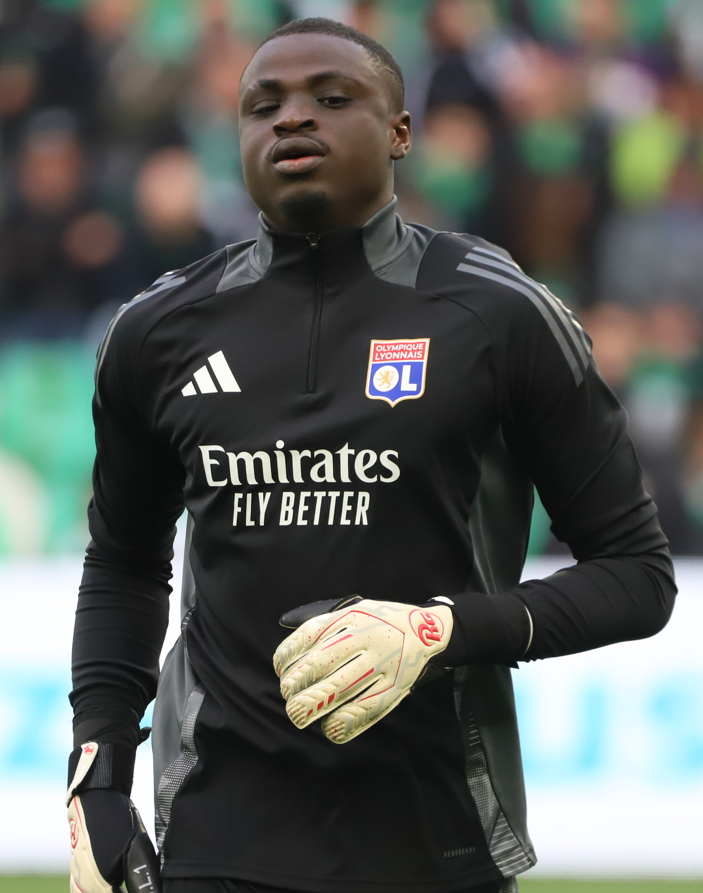
- Diarra in 2025

Personal information
- Full name: Lassine Diarra
- Date of birth: 11 November 2002 (age 23)
- Place of birth: Bamako, Mali
- Height: 1.85 m (6 ft 1 in)
- Position: Goalkeeper

Team information
- Current team: Lyon
- Number: 50

Youth career
- –2016: Aspire Academy Dakar

Senior career*
Years	Team	Apps	(Gls)
2016–2022	Lakika FC		
2022–2023	Châteauroux	0	(0)
2022–2023	Châteauroux B	10	(0)
2023–	Lyon B	19	(0)
2025–	Lyon	0	(0)

International career^{‡}
2023–2024	Mali U23	8	(0)
- * Club domestic league appearances and goals as of 15 March 2026 ‡ National team caps and goals as of 15 August 2024

Lassine Diarra (born 11 November 2002) is a Malian professional footballer who plays as a goalkeeper for Ligue 1 club Lyon.

== Club career ==
Born in Bamako in Mali, Diarra was formed at the Aspire Academy section in Dakar, Senegal. At 14 years old, he came back to Mali and joined Niamakoro based club Lakika FC.

In 2022, Diarra moved abroad and joined French club Châteauroux. He made his senior debut with the club's reserve team in the Championnat National 3. A year later, in November 2023, he signed for the reserves side of Ligue 1 club Lyon.

In January 2025, Diarra was promoted to Lyon's first team, becoming the third-choice goalkeeper.

== International career ==
Diarra represented the Mali Olympics at the 2024 Paris Olympics. As the starter goalkeeper, he played in all three group stage games as Mali failed to qualify to the quarter-finals.

== Career statistics ==
=== Club ===
As of match played 15 March 2026

Appearances and goals by club, season and competition
Club	Season	League			Cup		Europe		Other		Total	
Club	Season	Division	Apps	Goals	Apps	Goals	Apps	Goals	Apps	Goals	Apps	Goals
Châteauroux II	2022–23	National 3	10	0	—		—		—		10	0
Lyon B	2023–24	National 3	8	0	—		—		1 (Note: Appearance(s) in Premier League International Cup)	0	9	0
Lyon B	2024–25	National 3	5	0	—		—		2	0	7	0
Lyon B	2025–26	National 3	6	0	—		—		—		6	0
Lyon B	Total		19	0	—		—		3	0	22	0
Lyon	2024–25	Ligue 1	0	0	0	0	0	0	—		0	0
Lyon	2025–26	Ligue 1	0	0	0	0	0	0	—		0	0
Lyon	Total		0	0	0	0	0	0	—		0	0
Career total			29	0	0	0	0	0	3	0	32	0
