= Abner Vinícius =

Brazilian footballer (born 2000)

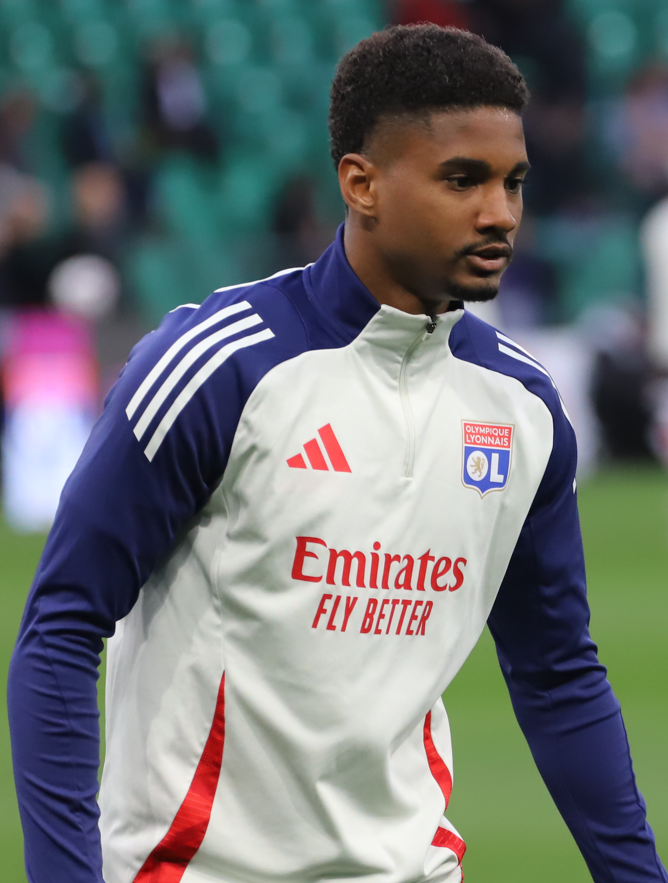
- Abner with Lyon in 2025

Personal information
- Full name: Abner Vinícius da Silva Santos
- Date of birth: 27 May 2000 (age 26)
- Place of birth: Presidente Prudente, Brazil
- Height: 1.81 m (5 ft 11 in)
- Position: Left-back

Team information
- Current team: Lyon
- Number: 16

Youth career
- Grêmio Prudente
- Mogi Mirim
- 2017–2019: Ponte Preta

Senior career*
Years	Team	Apps	(Gls)
2019	Ponte Preta	9	(1)
2019–2023	Athletico Paranaense	105	(4)
2023–2024	Betis	36	(0)
2024–	Lyon	51	(4)

International career^{‡}
2019–2021	Brazil U23	3	(0)
2024–	Brazil	4	(0)
Medal record
Men's football
Representing Brazil
Olympic Games
Gold medal – first place	2020 Tokyo	Team
- * Club domestic league appearances and goals as of 18 October 2026 ‡ National team caps and goals as of 19 November 2024

Abner Vinícius da Silva Santos (born 27 May 2000), known as Abner Vinícius or simply Abner, is a Brazilian professional footballer who plays as a left-back for Ligue 1 club Lyon and the Brazil national team.

== Club career ==
=== Ponte Preta ===
Abner began his career playing at youth level for his hometown club Grêmio Desportivo Prudente. He then had a brief spell at Mogi Mirim, before joining Ponte Preta in 2017. He was promoted to the senior team in 2019 and made his professional debut on 16 March 2019, in a Derby Campineiro match against Guarani in the 2019 Campeonato Paulista, which Ponte Preta won 3–0. He scored his first professional goal on 25 May 2019, which was Ponte's third in a 4–2 league win over Paraná.

=== Athletico Paranaense ===
On 19 July 2019, Abner joined Athletico Paranaense. He made his Série A debut with the club eight days later, coming off the bench in a 2–0 away win over Cruzeiro.

=== Betis ===
On 15 January 2023, Abner joined Real Betis. The transfer fee paid to Athletico Paranaense was €7 million.

=== Olympique Lyonnais ===
Abner's transfer to Olympique Lyonnais was announced on 5 July 2024. He signed a five-year contract and the transfer fee paid to Real Betis was €8 million.

== International career ==
In 2021, Abner was included on the roster of the Brazil Olympic squad for the Tokyo Olympics. He appeared in one game during the tournament as Brazil won the gold medal.

In October 2024, Abner received his first call up to the Brazil national team for the 2026 FIFA World Cup qualification games against Chile and Peru. He made his debut on 10 October 2024 against Chile, as a starter.

== Career statistics ==
=== Club ===
As of match played 18 October 2026

Appearances and goals by club, season and competition
Club	Season	League			State league		National cup		Continental		Other		Total	
Club	Season	Division	Apps	Goals	Apps	Goals	Apps	Goals	Apps	Goals	Apps	Goals	Apps	Goals
Ponte Preta	2019	Série B	9	1	4	0	—		—		—		13	1
Athletico Paranaense	2019	Série A	7	0	0	0	0	0	0	0	0	0	9	0
Athletico Paranaense	2020	Série A	34	3	7	0	2	0	3 (Note: Appearances in Copa Libertadores)	0	1 (Note: Appearance in Supercopa do Brasil)	0	47	3
Athletico Paranaense	2021	Série A	24	0	0	0	6	0	11 (Note: Appearances in Copa Sudamericana)	1	—		41	1
Athletico Paranaense	2022	Série A	28	1	5	0	5	0	12	0	2 (Note: Appearances in Recopa Sudamericana)	0	41	1
Athletico Paranaense	Total		93	4	12	0	13	0	26	1	3	0	147	5
Betis	2022–23	La Liga	13	0	—		1	0	2 (Note: Appearances in UEFA Europa League)	0	—		16	0
Betis	2023–24	La Liga	23	0	—		1	0	5	0	—		29	0
Betis	Total		36	0	—		2	0	7	0	—		45	0
Lyon	2024–25	Ligue 1	19	1	—		2	0	6	1	—		27	2
Lyon	2025–26	Ligue 1	26	3	—		3	1	7	1	—		36	5
Lyon	2026–27	Ligue 1	6	0	—		0	0	5 (Note: Four appearances in UEFA Champions League, one appearance in UEFA Europa League)	0	—		11	0
Lyon	Total		51	4	—		5	1	18	2	—		74	7
Career total			188	9	16	0	20	1	51	3	3	0	278	13

== Honours ==
Athletico Paranaense

- Campeonato Paranaense: 2020
- Copa Sudamericana: 2021

Brazil U23

- Summer Olympics: 2020
