= Khalis Merah =

French footballer (born 2007)

Personal information
- Date of birth: 24 February 2007 (age 19)
- Place of birth: Meyzieu, France
- Height: 1.78 m (5 ft 10 in)
- Position: Midfielder

Team information
- Current team: Lyon
- Number: 18

Youth career
- 2012–2015: US Meyzieu
- 2016–2025: Lyon

Senior career*
Years	Team	Apps	(Gls)
2025–	Lyon B	4	(0)
2025–	Lyon	29	(1)

International career^{‡}
2023	France U16	2	(0)
2025–2026	France U19	6	(2)
2025–	France U20	6	(0)
- * Club domestic league appearances and goals as of 14 November 2026 ‡ National team caps and goals as of 17 November 2026

Khalis Merah (born 24 February 2007) is a French professional footballer who plays as a midfielder for Ligue 1 club Lyon.

== Club career ==
Born in Meyzieu in the Metropolis of Lyon, Merah began his youth career at US Meyzieu, his local club. In July 2016, he joined the youth academy of regional giants Lyon.

On 24 February 2025, on his 18th birthday, Merah signed his first professional contract with Lyon, tying him to the club until June 2027. He captained Lyon's under-19 side during the 2024–25 season, before being integrated into their reserve team at the end of the season, where he made his senior debut in the Championnat National 3.

Ahead of the 2025–26 season, Merah was promoted to the first team by coach Paulo Fonseca. He made his first official appearance for Lyon on 16 August 2025 in a 1–0 away win over Lens during the first matchday of the 2025–26 Ligue 1, coming on as a substitute in the 66th minute. Shortly after his professional debut, on 26 August, Merah extended his contract with Lyon until 2029. Five days later, he earned his first start for Les Gones, playing 71 minutes in a 1–0 victory over Marseille in the Choc des Olympiques. Following his impressive performances, Merah was given the Pépite du mois award for the best youth talent of the month in Ligue 1.

== International career ==
Merah appeared twice for France U16s in March 2023.

In October 2025, Merah was initially called up to the France U20 squad for the 2025 FIFA U-20 World Cup, but Lyon refused to release the player as the competition was held outside the FIFA International Match Calendar.

== Playing style ==
Merah is a versatile midfielder. He is capable of anchoring the midfield as a defensive midfielder as well as a central midfielder.

== Personal life ==
Merah was born and raised in France to parents of Algerian descent.

== Career statistics ==
As of match played 14 November 2026

Appearances and goals by club, season and competition
Club	Season	League			Cup		Europe		Other		Total	
Club	Season	Division	Apps	Goals	Apps	Goals	Apps	Goals	Apps	Goals	Apps	Goals
Lyon B	2024–25	CFA 2	4	0	—		—		2 (Note: Appearance(s) in Premier League International Cup)	0	6	0
Lyon	2025–26	Ligue 1	22	0	2	0	8 (Note: Appearances in UEFA Europa League)	1	—		32	1
Lyon	2026–27	Ligue 1	7	1	0	0	2	0	—		9	1
Lyon	Total		29	1	2	0	10	1	—		41	2
Career total			33	1	2	0	10	1	2	0	47	2
