= Afonso Moreira =

Portuguese footballer (born 2005)

Personal information
- Full name: Afonso Bastardo Moreira
- Date of birth: 19 March 2005 (age 21)
- Place of birth: Lamego, Portugal
- Height: 1.76 m (5 ft 9 in)
- Positions: Left winger; left midfielder

Team information
- Current team: Bayer Leverkusen
- Number: 9

Youth career
- 2013–2017: Cracks de Lamego
- 2017–2023: Sporting CP

Senior career*
Years	Team	Apps	(Gls)
2022–2025	Sporting CP B	55	(11)
2023–2025	Sporting CP	2	(0)
2024	→ Gil Vicente (loan)	4	(0)
2025–2026	Lyon	27	(4)
2026–	Bayer Leverkusen	8	(0)

International career^{‡}
2021–2022	Portugal U17	11	(5)
2022	Portugal U18	3	(0)
2022–2023	Portugal U19	8	(0)
2024–	Portugal U20	6	(2)
2025–	Portugal U21	6	(1)
- * Club domestic league appearances and goals as of 31 October 2026 ‡ National team caps and goals as of 6 October 2026

Afonso Bastardo Moreira (born 19 March 2005) is a Portuguese professional footballer who plays as a left winger or left midfielder for Bundesliga club Bayer Leverkusen.

== Club career ==
=== Sporting CP ===
Born in Lamego, Viseu District, Afonso is a youth product of his local club Cracks Clube de Lamego, before moving to Sporting CP as a youth in 2017. On 26 July 2021, he signed his first professional contract with Sporting. On 20 August 2022, he extend his contract with the club until 2025 and starting playing with their reserves. He was promoted to Sporting's senior side in the summer of 2023. He made his senior and professional debut with Sporting CP in a 3–2 Primeira Liga win over Vizela on 12 August 2023.

On 26 January 2024, Afonso extended his contract with Sporting until 2028, with his release clause being set at €60 million.

On 29 January 2024, Sporting CP sent Afonso on loan to fellow Primeira Liga club Gil Vicente until the end of the 2023–24 season where he played five games but got injured in March.

Afonso returned from loan to Sporting, playing for B team in Liga 3 and also the under-19 in UEFA Youth League.

=== Lyon ===
On 22 July 2025, Afonso joined Ligue 1 side Lyon for a fee of €2 million and a 20% sell-on clause on a future sale in favor of Sporting CP, signing a contract until June 2029 with the French team. On October 23, 2025, Afonso scored his first goal for Olympique Lyonnais in a 2–0 UEFA Europa League victory over FC Basel. On January 11, 2026, Moreira scored the fastest goal in Olympique Lyonnais' history in the Coupe de France, finding the net after just 45 seconds in a 2–1 victory against Lille.

=== Bayer Leverkusen ===
On 17 June 2026, Afonso joined Bundesliga club Bayer Leverkusen for €32 million on a five-year contract.

== International career ==
Afonso is a youth international for Portugal, having played up to the Portugal U19s.

== Career statistics ==
As of match played 31 October 2026

Appearances and goals by club, season and competition
Club	Season	League			National cup (Note: Includes Taça de Portugal, Coupe de France)		League cup (Note: Includes Taça da Liga)		Europe		Total	
Club	Season	Division	Apps	Goals	Apps	Goals	Apps	Goals	Apps	Goals	Apps	Goals
Sporting CP B	2022–23	Liga 3	24	4	—		—		—		24	4
Sporting CP B	2023–24	Liga 3	9	0	—		—		—		9	0
Sporting CP B	2024–25	Liga 3	11	4	—		—		—		11	4
Sporting CP B	Total		44	8	—		—		—		44	8
Sporting CP	2023–24	Primeira Liga	1	0	1	0	1	0	0	0	3	0
Sporting CP	2024–25	Primeira Liga	1	0	1	0	0	0	1 (Note: Appearances in UEFA Champions League)	0	3	0
Sporting CP	Total		2	0	2	0	1	0	1	0	6	0
Gil Vicente (loan)	2023–24	Primeira Liga	4	0	1	0	0	0	—		5	0
Lyon	2025–26	Ligue 1	27	4	3	2	—		7 (Note: Appearances in UEFA Europa League)	2	37	8
Bayer Leverkusen	2026–27	Bundesliga	8	0	2	0	—		3	0	13	0
Career total			85	12	8	2	1	0	11	2	105	16
