= Jorge Maciel (football manager) =

Portuguese football manager

Personal information
- Full name: Jorge Miguel Gonçalves Maciel
- Date of birth: 30 October 1985 (age 41)
- Place of birth: Barcelos, Portugal

Team information
- Current team: Lyon (assistant head coach)

Managerial career
- Years: Team
- 2014–2015: Belenenses (assistant)
- 2017–2018: Rio Ave (assistant)
- 2018: Nantes (assistant)
- 2018–2019: Celta Vigo (assistant)
- 2019: Benfica U19
- 2019: Benfica U23
- 2019–2023: Lille (assistant)
- 2023: Valenciennes
- 2024–: Lyon (assistant)
- 2025: Lyon (caretaker)
- 2026: Lyon (caretaker)

Jorge Miguel Gonçalves Maciel (born 30 October 1985) is a Portuguese football manager who is currently the assistant head coach of Ligue 1 club Lyon.

== Career ==
Born in Barcelos, Maciel was an assistant manager for Lito Vidigal and Jorge Simão at Primeira Liga club Belenenses in 2014–15.

From 2017 to 2019, he assisted compatriot Miguel Cardoso at Rio Ave, Nantes and Celta Vigo.

Maciel returned to his homeland in July 2019 to be manager of Benfica's under-23 team, but returned to being an assistant in November at Lille, to help Christophe Galtier, Jocelyn Gourvennec and Paulo Fonseca.

On 5 July 2023, at the age of 37, Maciel left Lille to become head coach of Ligue 2 club Valenciennes, signing a two-year contract. On his debut on 5 August, the team lost 4–1 at home to Auxerre. On 6 December 2023, with Valenciennes sitting last-place in the Ligue 2 table after just one victory in seventeen matches, Maciel was sacked.

== Managerial statistics ==
As of 8 November 2026

Managerial record by team and tenure
Team	Nat	From	To	Record							
Team	Nat	From	To	G	W	D	L	GF	GA	GD	Win %
Valenciennes	(France)	5 July 2023	6 December 2023	18	2	8	8	12	23	−11	11.11
Lyon (caretaker)	(France)	28 January 2025	30 January 2025	1	0	1	0	1	1	+0	0.00
Lyon (caretaker)	(France)	4 November 2026	9 November 2026	2	0	1	1	1	3	−2	0.00
Total				21	2	10	9	14	27	−13	9.52
