= Adam Karabec =

Czech footballer (born 2003)

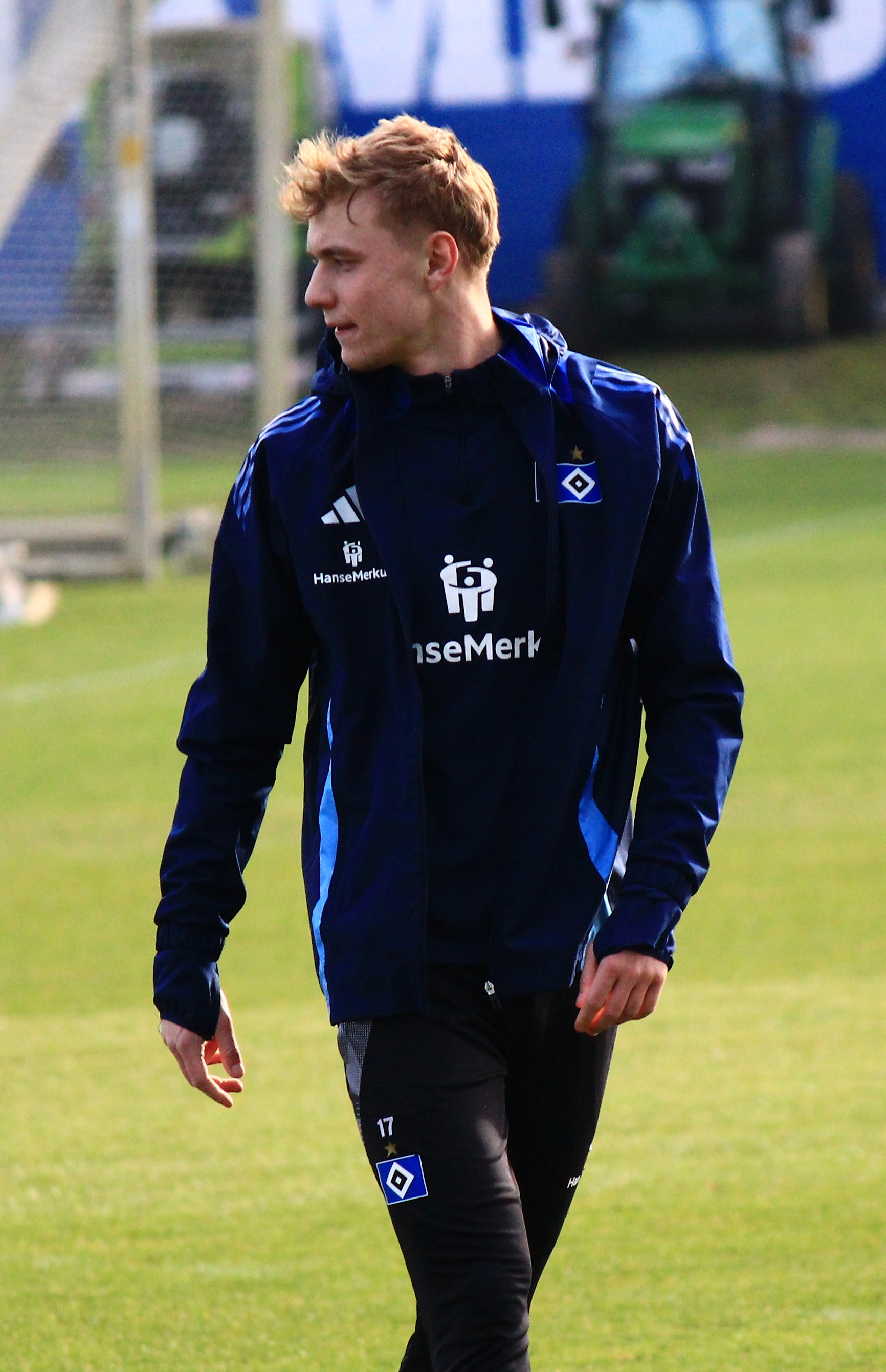
- Karabec in 2025 with Hamburger SV

Personal information
- Date of birth: 2 July 2003 (age 23)
- Place of birth: Prague, Czech Republic
- Height: 1.86 m (6 ft 1 in)
- Positions: Attacking midfielder; winger

Team information
- Current team: Sparta Prague
- Number: 10

Youth career
- 2009–2016: Bohemians 1905
- 2016–2020: Sparta Prague

Senior career*
Years	Team	Apps	(Gls)
2019–	Sparta Prague	114	(15)
2022–2023	→ Sparta Prague B	5	(0)
2024–2025	→ Hamburger (loan)	31	(3)
2025–2026	→ Lyon (loan)	21	(1)

International career^{‡}
2017–2018	Czech Republic U15	10	(3)
2018–2019	Czech Republic U16	14	(3)
2019–2020	Czech Republic U19	8	(0)
2020–	Czech Republic U21	29	(5)
2025–	Czech Republic	7	(3)
- * Club domestic league appearances and goals as of 22:42, 8 September 2026 (UTC) ‡ National team caps and goals as of 29 September 2026

Adam Karabec (born 2 July 2003) is a Czech professional footballer who plays as an attacking midfielder or winger for Czech First League club Sparta Prague and the Czech Republic national team. He was included in The Guardian's "Next Generation" list for 2020.

== Club career ==
After a long spell in the youth academy of Bohemians 1905, which he had joined at the age of six, in 2016 Karabec gained a move to fellow Prague-based club Sparta Prague and began making it through the Letenští's youth teams. By the beginning of the 2019–20 season, Karabec was already a member of Sparta's under-19 squad, despite being only sixteen. In July 2019, he was named "Player of the Tournament" in the CEE Cup. By September 2019, he had also begun to play for the reserve team in their regional group of the national third division.

It took less than five months to the midfielder to impress the then head coach Václav Jílek and gain a call-up to join the first team. Karabec subsequently made his professional debut on 23 February 2020, coming on as a replacement for David Moberg Karlsson at the 88th minute of his side's 1–0 loss against Sigma Olomuc. After collecting other three appearances as a substitute and scoring his first goal in a 4–1 win against Karviná, he also made his first start on 10 June 2020, as he featured in Sparta's 2–0 win against Opava and was replaced by Georges Mandjeck at the 76th minute.

On 4 July 2024, Karabec joined German 2. Bundesliga club Hamburger SV on a loan with option to make the move permanent. On 12 August 2025, he joined Ligue 1 club Lyon on a one-year loan deal with an option to make transfer permanent. Later that month, on 23 August, he scored his first goal in a 3–0 victory over Metz.

On 28 August 2026, he became Sparta's captain, replacing Lukáš Haraslín who left to Saudi Arabia.

== International career ==
A youth international for Czech Republic at several levels, in September 2020, Karabec received his first call-up both by the Under-21 and the senior national teams.

On 2 September 2020, he made his debut for the former squad against San Marino U21, registering an assist for Václav Drchal's opener which ended up in a 6–0 victory for the Czechs. Exactly one week later, Karabec was featured on the bench in the senior team's UEFA Nations League match against Scotland.

Karabec played for the Czech Republic in the UEFA European Under-21 championships in 2021, 2023 and 2025, and thus became the first Czech player to appear in three UEFA European Under-21 championships. On 8 September 2025, he debuted for the Czech Republic national football team in a 1–1 friendly draw against Saudi Arabia.

== Career statistics ==
=== Club ===
As of match played 19 April 2026

Appearances and goals by club, season and competition
Club	Season	League			National cup		Europe		Total	
Club	Season	Division	Apps	Goals	Apps	Goals	Apps	Goals	Apps	Goals
Sparta Prague	2019–20	Czech First League	10	1	0	0	–		10	1
Sparta Prague	2020–21	Czech First League	23	3	3	0	5 (Note: Appearances in UEFA Europa League)	0	31	3
Sparta Prague	2021–22	Czech First League	30	2	4	0	8 (Note: Three appearances in UEFA Champions League, three appearances in UEFA Europa League, two appearances in UEFA Europa Conference League)	0	42	2
Sparta Prague	2022–23	Czech First League	23	2	3	0	2 (Note: Appearances in UEFA Europa Conference League)	0	28	2
Sparta Prague	2023–24	Czech First League	21	4	2	1	7	0	30	5
Sparta Prague	Total		107	12	12	1	22	0	141	13
Sparta Prague B	2022–23	Czech National Football League	5	0	–		–		5	0
Hamburger SV (loan)	2024–25	2. Bundesliga	31	3	2	0	—		33	3
Lyon (loan)	2025–26	Ligue 1	21	1	4	0	9	2	34	3
Career total			165	16	18	1	31	2	213	19

=== International ===
As of match played 29 September 2026

Appearances and goals by national team and year
National team	Year	Apps	Goals
Czech Republic	2025	4	2
Czech Republic	2026	3	1
Total		7	3

Scores and results list the Czech Republic's goal tally first.

List of international goals scored by Adam Karabec
No.	Date	Venue	Opponent	Score	Result	Competition
1.	12 October 2025	Tórsvøllur, Tórshavn, Faroe Islands	Faroe Islands	1–1	1–2	2026 FIFA World Cup qualification
2.	17 November 2025	Andrův stadion, Olomouc, Czech Republic	Gibraltar	4–0	6–0	2026 FIFA World Cup qualification
3.	26 September 2026	Fortuna Arena, Prague, Czech Republic	Croatia	1–1	1–2	2026–27 UEFA Nations League A

== Honours ==
Sparta Prague

- Czech First League: 2022–23, 2023–24
- Czech Cup: 2023–24

Individual

- Czech Talent of the Year: 2021
