= 2025–26 Championnat National 3 =

Championnat National 3
- Season: 2025–26
- Dates: 16 August 2025 – 16 May 2026
- Promoted: Tarbes; Poiré-sur-Vie; Pontivy; Racing Club; Lille (res); ESTAC Troyes (res); Hauts Lyonnais; Lyon La Duchère
- Relegated: 16 Teams + 1 Team dissolved

The 2025–26 Championnat National 3 was the ninth and last season of the fifth tier in the French football league system in its current format. The competition was contested by 112 clubs split geographically across 8 groups of 14 teams. The teams included amateur clubs (although a few were semi-professional) and the reserve teams of professional clubs. The competition began on 16 August 2025 and ended on 16 May 2026. The fifth tier kept its 8-group format for next season, but was renamed to Championnat National 2, following the establishment of Ligue 3 for the 2026–27 season.

== Teams ==
On 17 July 2025, the FFF ratified the constitution of the competition, and published the groups. Following Ajaccio's exclusion from national competitions, and ASPTT Dijon winning their appeal to the French National Olympic and Sports Committee, the Burgundian team will take the Corsican reserve team's place in Group H.

Changes from the 2024–25 season were as follows:

Teams joining the division

- Jura Sud, Anglet, Poiré-sur-Vie, Aubervilliers and Villers-Houlgate finished in relegation positions in 2024–25 Championnat National 2 (and weren't administratively relegated to regional leagues), FC Balagne was administratively relegated
- 13 teams gained promotion from the various Régional 1 leagues.

Teams promoted to Championnat National 3
Region	Team	Method of qualification
Nouvelle-Aquitaine	Cestas	Champion, R1 Group B
Pays de la Loire	Les Sables-d'Olonne	Champion, R1 Group B
Centre-Val de Loire	Saran	Champion, R1 Centre-Val de Loire
Corse	Gazélec Ajaccio	Champion, R1 Corse
Méditerranée	Carnoux-en-Provence	Champion, R1 Méditerranée
Bourgogne-Franche-Comté	Chalon-sur-Saône	Champion, R1 Group B
Grand Est	Mulhouse	Champion, R1 Group C
Occitanie	Tarbes	Champion, R1 Group B
Hauts-de-France	Amiens (res)	Champion, R1 Group B
Normandy	Havre Caucriauville	Champion, R1 Group B
Brittany	Brest (res)	Champion, R1 Group A
Paris Île-de-France	Versailles (res)	Champion, R1 Group A
Auvergne-Rhône-Alpes	Feurs	Champion, R1 Group A

Teams leaving the division

- Bayonne, Chauray, Lorient (res), Borgo, Dieppe, Montlouis-sur-Loire, Saint-Maur, Colmar, Limonest and Rousset were champions of each group, and were promoted to 2024–25 Championnat National 2.
- Trélissac, Stade Bordelais, Bordeaux (res), ESOF La Roche-sur-Yon, TA Rennes, Sablé, Flers, Plabennec, Saint-Lô, ASPTT Caen, Chatou, Grand-Quevilly, AG Caen, Lens (res), Sannois-Saint-Gratien, Calais, Valenciennes (res), Avoine Chinon, Moulon Bourges, Châteauneuf-sur-Loire, Vineuil, Montceau-les-Mines, Louhans-Cuiseaux, Gueugnon, Sarreguemines, Sarre-Union, Raon-l'Étape, Strasbourg Koenigshoffen, Chassieu, Clermont (res), Espaly-Saint-Marcel, Chambéry, Sud FC, Aigues-Mortes, Corte and EUGA Ardziv were relegated to Régional 1 for the 2025–26 season. AC Ajaccio (res) was relegated to lower leagues following the club's exclusion from national competitions

Name changes and fusion

- Saint-Jean-Cap-Ferrat became Riviera FC
- Following Tours's dissolution, Ouest Tourangeau became UF Touraine
- Relegated from National 2, Villers-Houlgate fused with and was absorbed by Trouville-Deauville. The new entity will compete as Trouville-Deauville-Villers.
- Promoted from Régional 1, Saran altered its official denomination from USM Saran football to Saran FC.
- Mâcon alters its official denomination from Union du Football mâconnais to Mâcon 71.

== Promotion and relegation ==
If eligible, the top team in each group is promoted to Championnat National 1. If a team finishing top of the group is ineligible, or declines promotion, the next eligible team in that group is promoted.

This season a total of 24 teams will be relegated to Régional 1. This will result in teams finishing in the bottom three places being relegated. Initially, it was planned the worst eleventh was to be relegated, but the administrative relegation of AC Ajaccio changed that.

Reserve teams whose training centres are categorised as category 2B or lower cannot be promoted to Championnat National 2 by the rules of the competition.

== League tables ==
=== Group A ===
Pos	Team	Pld	W	D	L	GF	GA	GD	Pts	Promotion or relegation
1	Tarbes (C, P)	26	14	8	4	52	26	+26	47 (Note: Tarbes was deducted 3 points.)	Promotion to National 1
2	Canet Roussillon (Note: Following Bordeaux's exclusion from national championships, there was a missing team for the next National 1 season. Thus the best second from National 3 (calculated through results of the vice-champions against the teams placed first, third, fourth, fifth and sixth of their respective group) was also promoted.) (P)	26	12	9	5	37	22	+15	45	Promotion to National 1
3	Colomiers	26	13	6	7	47	42	+5	43 (Note: Colomiers was deducted 2 points.)	
4	Onet-le-Château	26	11	6	9	41	41	0	39	
5	Pau (res)	26	10	7	9	32	26	+6	37	
6	Anglet	26	12	7	7	41	28	+13	37 (Note: Anglet was deducted 6 points.)	
7	Bassin d'Arcachon	26	9	9	8	38	36	+2	36	
8	Toulouse (res)	26	9	6	11	32	28	+4	33	
9	Castanet	26	8	8	10	27	32	−5	32	
10	Blagnac	26	8	8	10	35	34	+1	29 (Note: Blagnac was deducted 3 points.)	
11	Lège Cap Ferret	26	6	10	10	38	53	−15	28	
12	Cestas	26	6	10	10	22	38	−16	28	
13	Agde (R)	26	6	6	14	23	43	−20	24	Relegation to Régional 1
14	Alberes Argelès (R)	26	5	6	15	24	40	−16	21	Relegation to Régional 1

Updated to match(es) played on 16 May 2026. Source:
Rules for classification: 1) points; 2) head-to-head results; 3) head-to-head goal difference; 4) goal difference; 5) number of goals scored; 6) fair play points; 7) draw
(C) Champions; (P) Promoted; (R) Relegated

=== Group B ===
Pos	Team	Pld	W	D	L	GF	GA	GD	Pts	Promotion or relegation
1	Poiré-sur-Vie (C, P)	26	17	6	3	45	24	+21	57	Promotion to National 1
2	UF Touraine (Note: Promoted by decision by the French Football Federation.)	26	17	5	4	49	18	+31	56	Promotion to National 1
3	Nantes (res)	26	15	6	5	37	20	+17	51	
4	Challans	26	12	10	4	52	26	+26	46	
5	La Châtaigneraie	26	10	9	7	40	43	−3	39	
6	Fontenay	26	9	5	12	30	38	−8	32	
7	Les Sables-d'Olonne	26	9	5	12	39	40	−1	32	
8	Panazol	26	11	3	12	36	35	+1	32 (Note: Panazol was deducted 4 points.)	
9	Châteauroux (res)	26	9	4	13	37	40	−3	31	
10	Saint-Philbert-de-Grand-Lieu	26	8	6	12	32	44	−12	30	
11	Vertou	26	7	7	12	32	38	−6	28	
12	Chauvigny	26	4	12	10	30	42	−12	24	
13	Angers (res) (E)	26	4	8	14	23	37	−14	20	Dissolved reserve team
14	Châtellerault (D)	26	4	6	16	21	58	−37	18	Demoted to Régional 2

Updated to match(es) played on 16 May 2026. Source:
Rules for classification: 1) points; 2) head-to-head results; 3) head-to-head goal difference; 4) goal difference; 5) number of goals scored; 6) fair play points; 7) draw
(C) Champions; (D) Relegated then demoted administratively; (E) Dissolved; (P) Promoted

=== Group C ===
Pos	Team	Pld	W	D	L	GF	GA	GD	Pts	Promotion or relegation
1	Pontivy (C, P)	26	16	8	2	42	24	+18	56	Promotion to National 1
2	Vire	26	15	8	3	41	17	+24	53	
3	Vitré	26	9	12	5	27	24	+3	39	
4	Laval (res)	26	12	3	11	31	25	+6	39	
5	Guingamp (res)	26	10	5	11	36	33	+3	35	
6	Cesson-Sévigné	26	9	7	10	35	30	+5	34	
7	Lannion	26	8	9	9	34	31	+3	33	
8	Brest (res)	26	8	8	10	29	31	−2	32	
9	Milizac	26	8	8	10	27	34	−7	32	
10	Alençon	26	7	9	10	39	53	−14	30	
11	Rennes (res)	26	6	11	9	32	26	+6	29	
12	Vannes	26	8	7	11	32	39	−7	29 (Note: Vannes was deducted 2 points.)	
13	Ergué-Gabéric (R)	26	7	8	11	28	43	−15	26 (Note: Ergué-Gabéric was deducted 3 points.)	Relegation to Régional 1
14	Fougères (R)	26	4	7	15	20	43	−23	19	Relegation to Régional 1

Updated to match(es) played on 16 May 2026. Source:
Rules for classification: 1) points; 2) head-to-head results; 3) head-to-head goal difference; 4) goal difference; 5) number of goals scored; 6) fair play points; 7) draw
(C) Champions; (P) Promoted; (R) Relegated

=== Group D ===
Pos	Team	Pld	W	D	L	GF	GA	GD	Pts	Promotion or relegation
1	Racing Club (C, P)	26	16	8	2	54	21	+33	56	Promotion to National 1
2	Aubervilliers	26	13	8	5	34	24	+10	47	
3	SC Bastia (res)	26	12	7	7	44	30	+14	43	
4	Linas-Montlhéry	26	11	8	7	46	37	+9	41	
5	Versailles (res)	26	11	5	10	39	33	+6	38	
6	Chartres	26	10	8	8	45	38	+7	38	
7	Oissel	26	11	5	10	29	35	−6	38	
8	Sainte-Geneviève	26	10	2	14	37	40	−3	32	
9	Trouville-Deauville-Villers	26	7	8	11	27	37	−10	29	
10	Brétigny	26	7	7	12	31	39	−8	28	
11	SM Caen (res)	26	8	5	13	27	36	−9	28 (Note: SM Caen (res) was deducted 1 point.)	
12	Saint-Ouen-l'Aumône	26	7	7	12	28	51	−23	28	
13	Dives-Cabourg (R)	26	6	8	12	32	41	−9	26	Relegation to Régional 1
14	Havre Caucriauville (R)	26	7	6	13	26	37	−11	8 (Note: Havre Caucriauville was deducted a total of 19 points.)	Relegation to Régional 1

Updated to match(es) played on 16 May 2026. Source:
Rules for classification: 1) points; 2) head-to-head results; 3) head-to-head goal difference; 4) goal difference; 5) number of goals scored; 6) fair play points; 7) draw
(C) Champions; (P) Promoted; (R) Relegated

=== Group E ===
Pos	Team	Pld	W	D	L	GF	GA	GD	Pts	Promotion or relegation
1	Lille (res) (C, P)	26	15	3	8	56	34	+22	48	
2	Croix	26	14	4	8	37	20	+17	46	
3	Pays du Valois (Note: Pays du Valois was initially penalized by the FFF, with a 1 point deduction and a game loss for their match at home against Gazélec Ajaccio (end score: 3-2 for the home team). However, following an appeal, the Paris administrative tribunal suspended the sanction. Following the decision, the club would be virtually first with 49 points. The FFF took note of the decision, and Lille didn't contest it. Thus Pays du Valois was promoted to National 1, but the FFF didn't change the official standings.)	26	13	7	6	42	26	+16	46	Promotion to National 1
4	Charleville Prix-lès-Mézières	26	12	5	9	29	28	+1	40 (Note: Charleville Prix-lès-Mézières was deducted 1 point.)	
5	Vimy	26	11	6	9	40	33	+7	39	
6	Saint-Quentin	26	10	7	9	28	26	+2	37	
7	Drancy	26	10	5	11	43	38	+5	35	
8	Gazélec Ajaccio	26	9	7	10	32	36	−4	34	
9	Metz (res)	26	10	3	13	38	42	−4	33	
10	FC Balagne	26	9	6	11	27	29	−2	33	
11	Neuilly-sur-Marne	26	8	7	11	29	42	−13	31	
12	Pays de Cassel (D)	26	7	8	11	29	44	−15	29	Demoted to Régional 2
13	Amiens (res) (R)	26	8	5	13	31	44	−13	29	Relegation to Régional 1
14	Reims (res) (R)	26	5	9	12	21	40	−19	20 (Note: Reims (res) was deducted 4 points.)	Relegation to Régional 1

Updated to match(es) played on 16 May 2026. Source:
Rules for classification: 1) points; 2) head-to-head results; 3) head-to-head goal difference; 4) goal difference; 5) number of goals scored; 6) fair play points; 7) draw
(C) Champions; (D) Relegated then demoted administratively; (P) Promoted; (R) Relegated

=== Group F ===
Pos	Team	Pld	W	D	L	GF	GA	GD	Pts	Promotion or relegation
1	ESTAC Troyes (res) (C, P)	26	15	6	5	54	32	+22	51	Promotion to National 1
2	Thonon Évian	26	13	7	6	43	31	+12	46	
3	Chalon-sur-Saône	26	12	9	5	41	29	+12	45	
4	Racing Besançon	26	11	10	5	38	24	+14	43	
5	Jura Dolois	26	12	6	8	37	31	+6	42	
6	Torcy	26	10	7	9	32	30	+2	37	
7	Pontarlier	26	9	9	8	38	31	+7	36	
8	Ivry	26	9	8	9	26	29	−3	35	
9	Thaon	26	9	5	12	44	42	+2	32	
10	Belfort	26	7	9	10	37	34	+3	30	
11	Mulhouse	26	8	6	12	35	46	−11	30	
12	RC Strasbourg (res)	26	7	7	12	28	48	−20	28	
13	Sochaux (res) (Note: Maintained as best thirteenth (through a ranking based on their results against the teams ranked eighth to twelfth in their respective group).)	26	7	6	13	37	44	−7	27	
14	Besançon Football (R)	26	2	7	17	18	57	−39	13	Relegation to Régional 1

Updated to match(es) played on 16 May 2026. Source:
Rules for classification: 1) points; 2) head-to-head results; 3) head-to-head goal difference; 4) goal difference; 5) number of goals scored; 6) fair play points; 7) draw
(C) Champions; (P) Promoted; (R) Relegated

=== Group G ===
Pos	Team	Pld	W	D	L	GF	GA	GD	Pts	Promotion or relegation
1	Hauts Lyonnais (C, P)	26	17	7	2	48	20	+28	58	Promotion to National 1
2	Mâcon	26	16	6	4	52	23	+29	54	
3	Dijon (res)	26	10	10	6	44	35	+9	40	
4	Romorantin	26	9	10	7	42	30	+12	37	
5	Orléans (res)	26	10	6	10	39	37	+2	36	
6	Auxerre (res)	26	9	8	9	31	31	0	35	
7	Saran (R)	26	9	7	10	42	45	−3	34	Administrative relegation to Régional 1
8	Vierzon	26	10	3	13	42	53	−11	33	
9	Feurs	26	7	11	8	42	46	−4	32	
10	Chamalières	26	8	6	12	33	35	−2	30	
11	Saint-Étienne (res)	26	7	9	10	28	35	−7	30	
12	Moulins Yzeure (R)	26	7	8	11	26	45	−19	29	Administrative relegation to Régional 1
13	Jura Sud (R)	26	7	5	14	25	41	−16	26	Relegation to Régional 1
14	Cosne-sur-Loire (R)	26	4	8	14	26	44	−18	20	Relegation to Régional 1

Updated to match(es) played on 16 May 2026. Source:
Rules for classification: 1) points; 2) head-to-head results; 3) head-to-head goal difference; 4) goal difference; 5) number of goals scored; 6) fair play points; 7) draw
(C) Champions; (P) Promoted; (R) Relegated

=== Group H ===
Pos	Team	Pld	W	D	L	GF	GA	GD	Pts	Promotion or relegation
1	Lyon La Duchère (C, P)	26	16	4	6	54	30	+24	52	Promotion to National 1
2	Fos-sur-Mer	26	15	6	5	53	31	+22	51	
3	Alès	26	16	4	6	56	27	+29	50 (Note: Alès was deducted 2 points.)	
4	Bourgoin-Jallieu	26	13	8	5	36	25	+11	47	
5	Marseille (res)	26	12	6	8	39	25	+14	42	
6	Cannet Rocheville	26	10	6	10	34	33	+1	36	
7	Montpellier (res)	26	11	2	13	35	45	−10	35	
8	Riviera FC	26	9	6	11	32	36	−4	33	
9	Beaucaire	26	9	6	11	27	35	−8	33	
10	Lucciana	26	8	8	10	36	34	+2	32	
11	Olympique Lyonnais (res)	26	7	8	11	37	50	−13	29	
12	ASPTT Dijon	26	5	8	13	27	43	−16	23	
13	Seyssinet-Pariset (R)	26	6	3	17	37	58	−21	21	Relegation to Régional 1
14	Carnoux-en-Provence (R)	26	4	7	15	37	68	−31	15 (Note: Carnoux-en-Provence was deducted 4 points.)	Relegation to Régional 1

Updated to match(es) played on 16 May 2026. Source:
Rules for classification: 1) points; 2) head-to-head results; 3) head-to-head goal difference; 4) goal difference; 5) number of goals scored; 6) fair play points; 7) draw
(C) Champions; (P) Promoted; (R) Relegated

== Season outcomes ==
=== Promotion ===
Tarbes, Poiré-sur-Vie, Pontivy, Racing Club, Pays du Valois, ESTAC Troyes (res), Hauts Lyonnais and Lyon La Duchère were champions of each group, and were promoted to 2026–27 Championnat National 1. Canet Roussillon and UF Touraine were also promoted.

=== Relegation ===
A total of 18 teams were relegated:

- Group A

Agde, Alberes Argelès

- Group B

Angers (res) (dissolution), SO Châtellerault (demotion to R2)

- Group C

Ergué-Gabéric, Fougères

- Group D

Dives-Cabourg, Havre Caucriauville

- Group E

Pays de Cassel (demotion to R2), Amiens (res), Reims (res)

- Group F

Besançon Football

- Group G

Saran (administrative relegation), Moulins Yzeure (administrative relegation), Jura Sud, Cosne-sur-Loire

- Group H

Seyssinet-Pariset, Carnoux-en-Provence
