= Malo Gusto =

French footballer (born 2003)

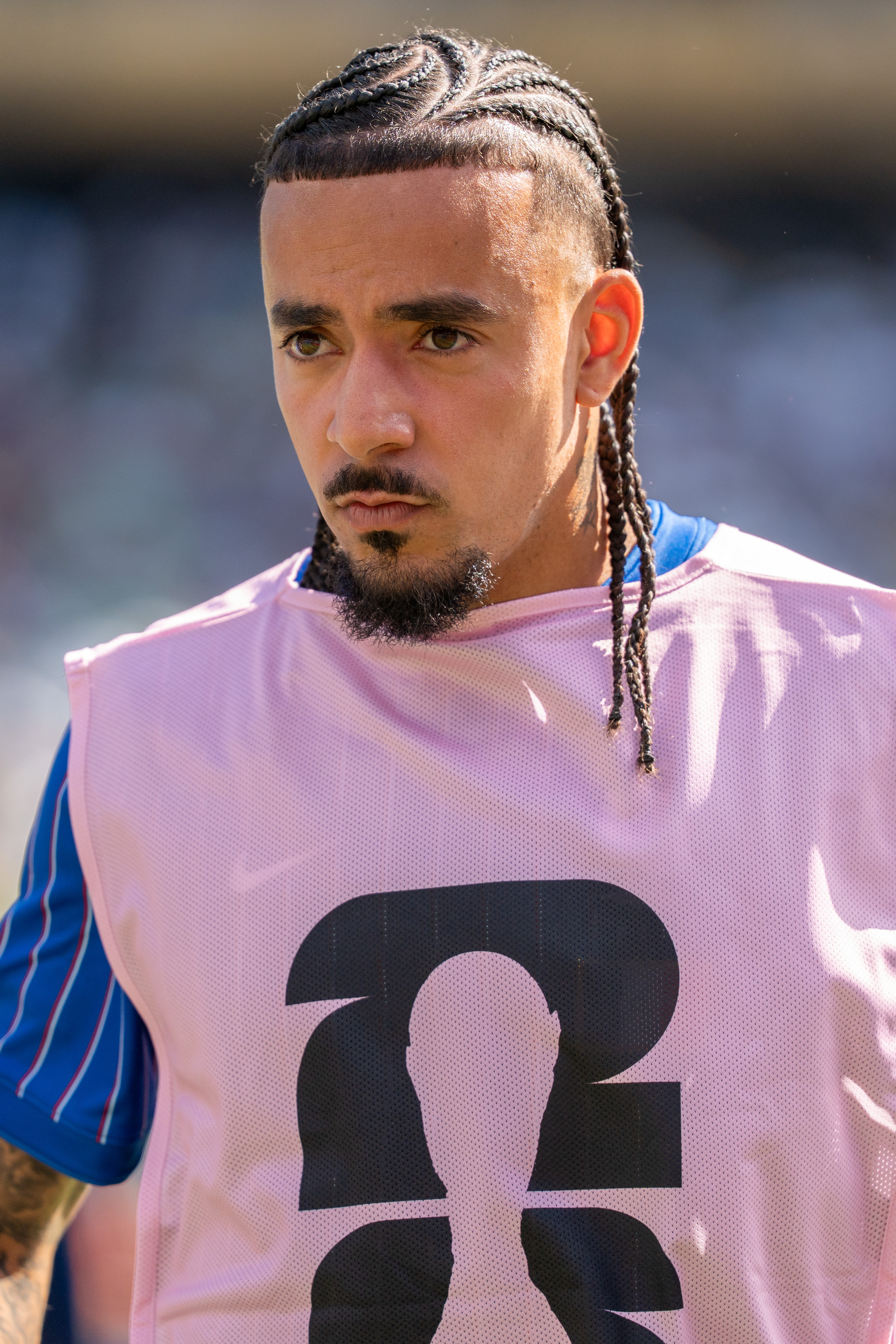
- Gusto with France in 2026

Personal information
- Full name: Malo Arthur Gusto
- Date of birth: 19 May 2003 (age 23)
- Place of birth: Décines-Charpieu, France
- Height: 1.78 m (5 ft 10 in)
- Position: Right-back

Team information
- Current team: Chelsea
- Number: 27

Youth career
- 2012–2015: AS Villefontaine
- 2015–2016: Bourgoin-Jallieu
- 2016–2021: Lyon

Senior career*
Years	Team	Apps	(Gls)
2020–2021	Lyon II	8	(1)
2021–2023	Lyon	53	(0)
2023–	Chelsea	101	(2)

International career^{‡}
2018	France U16	2	(0)
2019	France U17	1	(0)
2021	France U19	3	(0)
2021–2024	France U21	10	(1)
2023–	France	17	(0)
Medal record
Men's football
Representing France
UEFA Nations League
Third place	2025 Germany
- * Club domestic league appearances and goals as of 17:39, 21 November 2026 (UTC) ‡ National team caps and goals as of 22:15, 12 November 2026 (UTC)

Malo Arthur Gusto (born 19 May 2003) is a French professional footballer who plays as a right-back for Premier League club Chelsea and the France national team.

Originally a product of the Lyon academy, Gusto entered the Lyon first team in 2021, where he made over 50 league appearances. During the January 2023 transfer window, Gusto moved to Chelsea for a reported €30 million fee.

Internationally, Gusto has played for France at both youth and senior levels.

== Early life ==
Malo Arthur Gusto was born on 19 May 2003 in Décines-Charpieu, a commune in the Metropolis of Lyon. Growing up in Villefontaine, Isère, his father first made him play rugby, but the young Gusto soon chose to play association football, pursuing his dream to become a professional footballer while studying for a baccalauréat technologique.

== Club career ==
=== Lyon ===
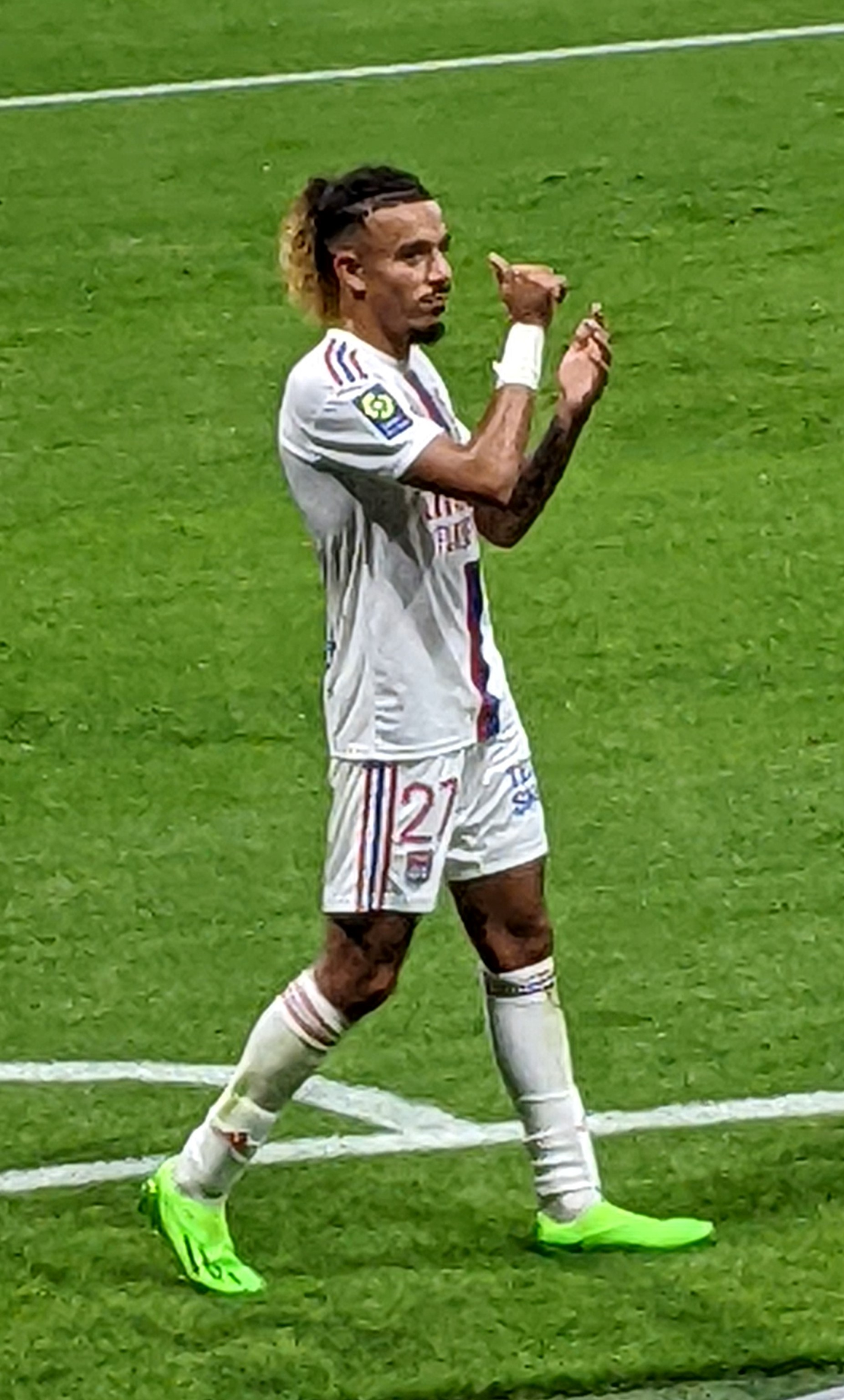
Gusto with Lyon in 2022

Malo Gusto started playing at the ASVF, later joining Bourgoin-Jallieu on a one-year spell, before entering the Lyon academy as an under-14, in a move resembling the one of his elder academy fellow Amine Gouiri. Gusto so happened to arrive in Lyon the same year that the club moved to the Stade des Lumières, in his home town.

There he was part of the same generation as Florent da Silva, Yaya Soumaré and Rayan Cherki, eventually signing his first professional contract with the French club in December 2020. At that point he had already made a few appearance on the team sheet for Ligue 1 games under Rudi Garcia's management, while already having shown his talent in the Youth League and National 2, with the reserve.

Malo Gusto made his professional debut for Lyon on 24 January 2021, replacing Bruno Guimarães on the 90th minute of a 5–0 Ligue 1 away win against their Derby du Rhône rivals of Saint-Étienne. Having made another short Ligue 1 appearance at the end of the season, the young defender signed a new contract with Lyon in June, tying him to the club until 2024.

Gusto started his first game during Lyon's opening match against Brest on 7 August. By doing so he became the youngest defender to start a Ligue 1 game for OL since Samuel Umtiti.

While still appearing to be behind Léo Dubois in the right back hierarchy, Gusto still took the spotlight on several occasions under Bosz's direction, as he started games such as the 2–0 Europa League away win against Rangers or the 2–1 Ligue 1 away loss against Paris Saint-Germain.

=== Chelsea ===
On 29 January 2023, Chelsea announced the signing of Malo Gusto on a deal until 2030. Lyon reported the transfer fee to be €30 million plus €5 million in bonuses. He was loaned back to Lyon until the end of the 2022–23 season. On 13 August, he made his debut for the club in a 1–1 draw against Liverpool in Chelsea's opening match of the 2023–24 season. On 24 September, he was shown his first red card in his career after Jarred Gillett went to the VAR monitor to review a late challenge he made on Lucas Digne in their home defeat to Aston Villa.

The 2024–25 season saw Gusto deployed, alongside Reece James, as a midfielder as well as a full-back as Chelsea won both the Conference League and Club World Cup. On 8 November 2025, Gusto scored his first goal for Chelsea against Wolverhampton Wanderers, ending a run of 165 games without a goal. Gusto also scored and assisted Cole Palmer in a 2–0 victory over Everton on 13 December.

== International career ==
Born in France, Gusto is of Portuguese descent through his father, and Martiniquais descent through his mother. He is a youth international for France: he first played as a midfielder for the under-16, but was later selected as a fullback with the U17 and U18. However, he did not play any official game with the latter, as the COVID-19 pandemic did not allow most youth international encounters or competitions to go on as planned during 2020–2021.

In September 2021, as the pandemic was slowing down, the young defender eventually gained his next French cap, this time playing with the under-19. He was called up for a friendly tournament in Slovenia, against Russia, Slovakia and the hosts, along with his teammate Rayan Cherki. There he started and played every minute of all three games, even ending up wearing the captain's armband.

However only a month later both he and Cherki were directly promoted to the under-21 team, by Sylvain Ripoll. The two of them made their debut coming off the bench with the espoirs on 8 October 2021, helping their team to an important 5–0 win against Ukraine in the Euro qualifying.

On 9 October 2023, Gusto received his first call-up to the France national team for matches against the Netherlands and Scotland, replacing the injured Jules Koundé. On 13 October 2023, he made his international debut in the European Championship qualifier match against the Netherlands, coming off the bench in the 80th minute, helping France to a 2–1 victory, clinching the qualification as a result.

Gusto was selected as a member of the France squad for the 2026 FIFA World Cup. Gusto and the rest of the team finished in fourth-place as England national football team proceeded to win the third-place match 6-4.

== Style of play ==
Gusto is seen as an agile and offensively minded player, ever since playing eight-a-side football at Villefontaine, and he first played as an attacking midfielder or a forward. While he was at the Lyon academy he played in several different positions, including wide midfielder, advanced playmaker, and right winger. He eventually settled as a right back, where he took full advantage of his speed and athleticism.

== Career statistics ==
=== Club ===
As of match played 21 November 2026

Appearances and goals by club, season and competition
Club	Season	League			National cup (Note: Includes Coupe de France, FA Cup)		League cup (Note: Includes EFL Cup)		Europe		Other		Total	
Club	Season	Division	Apps	Goals	Apps	Goals	Apps	Goals	Apps	Goals	Apps	Goals	Apps	Goals
Lyon II	2020–21	National 2	7	0	—		—		—		—		7	0
Lyon II	2021–22	National 2	1	1	—		—		—		—		1	1
Lyon II	Total		8	1	—		—		—		—		8	1
Lyon	2020–21	Ligue 1	2	0	0	0	—		—		—		2	0
Lyon	2021–22	Ligue 1	30	0	0	0	—		7 (Note: Appearances in UEFA Europa League)	0	—		37	0
Lyon	2022–23	Ligue 1	21	0	1	0	—		—		—		22	0
Lyon	Total		53	0	1	0	—		7	0	—		61	0
Chelsea	2023–24	Premier League	27	0	5	0	5	0	—		—		37	0
Chelsea	2024–25	Premier League	32	0	2	0	1	0	6 (Note: Appearances in UEFA Conference League)	0	7 (Note: Appearances in FIFA Club World Cup)	0	48	0
Chelsea	2025–26	Premier League	34	2	4	0	4	0	7 (Note: Appearances in UEFA Champions League)	1	—		49	3
Chelsea	2026–27	Premier League	8	0	0	0	3	0	—		—		11	0
Chelsea	Total		101	2	11	0	13	0	13	1	7	0	145	3
Career total			162	3	12	0	13	0	20	1	7	0	214	4

=== International ===
As of match played 12 November 2026

Appearances and goals by national team and year
National team	Year	Apps	Goals
France	2023	1	0
France	2025	7	0
France	2026	9	0
Total		17	0

== Honours ==
Chelsea

- UEFA Conference League: 2024–25
- FIFA Club World Cup: 2025
- EFL Cup runner-up: 2023–24
- FA Cup runner-up: 2025–26

France

- UEFA Nations League third place: 2024–25
