= 2022–23 Olympique Lyonnais season =

Olympique Lyonnais
2022–23 season
- Owner: Jean-Michel Aulas (until 19 December); John Textor (from 19 December)
- President: Jean-Michel Aulas (until 5 May); John Textor (from 5 May)
- Head coach: Peter Bosz (until 9 October); Laurent Blanc (from 10 October)
- Stadium: Parc Olympique Lyonnais
- Ligue 1: 7th
- Coupe de France: Semi-finals
- Top goalscorer: League: Alexandre Lacazette (27); All: Alexandre Lacazette (31)
- Highest home attendance: 58,230 vs Paris Saint-Germain (18 September 2022)
- Lowest home attendance: 30,837 vs Brest (1 February 2023)
- Average home league attendance: 45,664 (77.2% of capacity)
- Biggest win: Lyon 5–0 Angers (3 September 2022)
- Biggest defeat: Lorient 3–1 Lyon (7 September 2022); Nice 3–1 Lyon (3 June 2023)
Home colours	Away colours	Third colours

The 2022–23 season was the 73rd season in the history of Olympique Lyonnais and their 34th consecutive season in the top flight. The club participated in Ligue 1 and the Coupe de France.

This season marked the end of Lyon's three decades under the ownership and presidency of French businessman Jean-Michel Aulas, replaced by American businessman John Textor.

== Players ==
=== Squad information ===
Players and squad numbers last updated on 3 June 2023. Appearances include Ligue 1, Coupe de France, Coupe de la Ligue, Trophée des Champions, UEFA Champions League and UEFA Europa League matches.
Note: Flags indicate national team as has been defined under FIFA eligibility rules. Players may hold more than one non-FIFA nationality.

No.	Player	Nat.	Position(s)	Date of birth (age)	Signed in	Contract ends	Transfer fee	Signed from	Apps.	Goals	Notes
Goalkeepers
1	Anthony Lopes	(Portugal)	GK	1 October 1990 (aged 32)	2012	2025	N/A	(France) Youth Sector	456	0	Second nationality: France
35	Rémy Riou	(France)	GK	6 August 1987 (aged 35)	2022	2024	Free	(France) Caen	7	0	Originally from youth system
40	Kayne Bonnevie	(France)	GK	22 July 2001 (aged 21)	2020	2024	N/A	(France) Youth Sector	0	0	
Defenders
2	Sinaly Diomandé	(Ivory Coast)	CB / RB	9 April 2001 (aged 22)	2019	2025	N/A	(France) Youth Sector	75	0	
3	Nicolas Tagliafico	(Argentina)	LB	21 August 1992 (aged 30)	2022	2025	€4.2M	(Netherlands) Ajax	38	1	Second nationality: Italy
4	Castello Lukeba	(France)	CB	17 December 2002 (aged 20)	2021	2025	N/A	(France) Youth Sector	68	4	Second nationality: Angola
5	Dejan Lovren	(Croatia)	CB	5 July 1989 (aged 33)	2023	2025	Free	(Russia) Zenit Saint Petersburg	123	4	
12	Henrique	(Brazil)	LB	25 April 1994 (aged 29)	2021	2024	Free	(Brazil) Vasco da Gama	32	0	
17	Jérôme Boateng	(Germany)	CB	3 September 1988 (aged 34)	2021	2023	Free	(Germany) Bayern Munich	35	0	Second nationality: Ghana
20	Saël Kumbedi	(France)	RB	26 March 2005 (aged 18)	2022	2027	€1M	(France) Le Havre	23	0	
27	Malo Gusto	(France)	RB	19 May 2003 (aged 20)	2023	2023	Loan	(England) Chelsea	61	0	Second nationality: Portugal; Originally from youth system
29	Mamadou Sarr	(France)	CB	29 August 2005 (aged 17)	2022	2025	N/A	(France) Youth Sector	1	0	Second nationality: Senegal
Midfielders
6	Maxence Caqueret	(France)	CM	15 February 2000 (aged 23)	2018	2026	N/A	(France) Youth Sector	130	5	
8	Houssem Aouar	(Algeria)	CM / LM	30 June 1998 (aged 24)	2016	2023	N/A	(France) Youth Sector	233	41	Second nationality: France
23	Thiago Mendes	(Brazil)	DM / CB	15 March 1992 (aged 31)	2019	2025	€22M	(France) Lille	143	2	
24	Johann Lepenant	(France)	DM	22 October 2002 (aged 20)	2022	2027	€4.25M	(France) Caen	34	1	
38	Mohamed El Arouch	(France)	AM	6 April 2004 (aged 19)	2021	2025	N/A	(France) Youth Sector	2	0	
88	Corentin Tolisso	(France)	CM	3 August 1994 (aged 28)	2022	2027	Free	(Germany) Bayern Munich	194	30	Second nationality: Togo; Originally from youth system
Forwards
7	Amin Sarr	(Sweden)	CF / LW	11 March 2001 (aged 22)	2023	2027	€11M	(Netherlands) Heerenveen	15	1	
9	Moussa Dembélé	(France)	CF	12 July 1996 (aged 26)	2018	2023	€22M	(Scotland) Celtic	172	70	
10	Alexandre Lacazette	(France)	CF	28 May 1991 (aged 32)	2022	2025	Free	(England) Arsenal	314	160	Originally from youth system
18	Rayan Cherki	(France)	RW / AM	17 August 2003 (aged 19)	2019	2025	N/A	(France) Youth Sector	102	14	
26	Bradley Barcola	(France)	LW / RW	2 September 2002 (aged 20)	2021	2026	N/A	(France) Youth Sector	44	7	Second nationality: Togo
47	Jeffinho	(Brazil)	LW / RW	30 December 1999 (aged 23)	2023	2027	€10M	(Brazil) Botafogo	11	2	
Players away on loan
7	Karl Toko Ekambi	(Cameroon)	LW / CF	14 September 1992 (aged 30)	2020	2024	€11.5M	(Spain) Villarreal	114	38	Second nationality: France
15	Romain Faivre	(France)	RM / CM	14 July 1998 (aged 24)	2022	2026	€15M	(France) Brest	28	3	
22	Jeff Reine-Adélaïde	(France)	CM	17 January 1998 (aged 25)	2019	2024	€25M	(France) Angers	48	2	
30	Julian Pollersbeck	(Germany)	GK	16 August 1994 (aged 28)	2020	2024	€250 000	(Germany) Hamburg	11	0	
	Florent Da Silva	(France)	CM	2 April 2003 (aged 20)	2020	2025	N/A	(France) Youth Sector	1	0	
	Tino Kadewere	(Zimbabwe)	CF / RW	5 January 1996 (aged 27)	2020	2024	€12M	(France) Le Havre	53	11	
	Habib Keïta	(Mali)	CM	5 February 2002 (aged 21)	2020	2025	N/A	(France) Youth Sector	7	0	
	Youssouf Koné	(Mali)	LB	5 July 1995 (aged 27)	2019	2024	€9M	(France) Lille	16	0	
	Abdoulaye Ndiaye	(Senegal)	CB	10 April 2002 (aged 21)	2020	2025	N/A	(France) Youth Sector	0	0	
	Cenk Özkacar	(Turkey)	CB	6 October 2000 (aged 22)	2020	2025	€1.5M	(Turkey) Altay	1	0	
	Camilo Reijers	(Brazil)	CM	23 February 1999 (aged 24)	2021	2024	€2M	(Brazil) Ponte Preta	0	0	Second nationality: Netherlands
	Yaya Soumaré	(France)	RW	23 June 2000 (aged 22)	2020	2024	N/A	(France) Youth Sector	4	0	
Left during the season
10	Lucas Paquetá	(Brazil)	AM	27 August 1997 (aged 25)	2020	2025	€23.44M	(Italy) Milan	80	21	Second nationality: Portugal
11	Tetê	(Brazil)	RW	15 February 2000 (aged 23)	2022	2023	Loan	(Ukraine) Shakhtar Donetsk	30	8	
21	Damien Da Silva	(France)	CB	17 May 1988 (aged 35)	2021	2023	Free	(France) Rennes	29	0	Second nationality: Portugal

=== Players from Olympique Lyonnais Reserves and Academy ===
Note: Flags indicate national team as defined under FIFA eligibility rules; some limited exceptions apply. Players may hold more than one non-FIFA nationality.

No.	Pos.	Nation	Player
15	DF	MAR	Achraf Laaziri
31	DF	FRA	Irvyn Lomami
33	FW	ALG	Djibrail Dib
36	FW	FRA	Sekou Lega
39	FW	FRA	Gael Nsombi
41	MF	FRA	Noam Bonnet
43	DF	NIG	Philippe Boueye
44	DF	FRA	Marley Felix
45	DF	FRA	Ahmed Djimé

No.	Pos.	Nation	Player
46	MF	ALG	Idris Bounaas
47	MF	FRA	Sofiane Augarreau
50	GK	FRA	Mathieu Patouillet
—	DF	CRO	Téo Barisic
—	DF	GBS	Celestino Iala
—	DF	FRA	Jérémy Mounsesse
—	MF	TUN	Chaïm El Djebali
—	FW	ALG	Yannis Lagha

== Transfers ==
=== In ===
No.	Pos.	Player	Transferred from	Fee	Date	Source
Summer
19	DF	(Turkey) Cenk Özkacar	(Belgium) Leuven	Loan return	30 June 2022	
	FW	(France) Lenny Pintor	(France) Troyes	Loan return	30 June 2022	
34	FW	(France) Yaya Soumaré	(France) Annecy	Loan return	30 June 2022	
	MF	(France) Florent Da Silva	(France) Villefranche	Loan return	30 June 2022	
	DF	(Mali) Youssouf Koné	(France) Troyes	Loan return	30 June 2022	
35	GK	(France) Rémy Riou	(France) Caen	Free	1 July 2022	
88	MF	(France) Corentin Tolisso	(Germany) Bayern Munich	Free	1 July 2022	
10	FW	(France) Alexandre Lacazette	(England) Arsenal	Free	1 July 2022	
24	MF	(France) Johann Lepenant	(France) Caen	€4.25M	1 July 2022	
3	DF	(Argentina) Nicolás Tagliafico	(Netherlands) Ajax	€4.2M	23 July 2022	
20	DF	(France) Saël Kumbedi	(France) Le Havre	€1M	31 August 2022	
Winter
	MF	(Brazil) Camilo	(Brazil) Cuiabá	Loan return	1 January 2023	
5	DF	(Croatia) Dejan Lovren	(Russia) Zenit Saint Petersburg	Free	2 January 2023	
27	DF	(France) Malo Gusto	(England) Chelsea	Loan	29 January 2023	
7	FW	(Sweden) Amin Sarr	(Netherlands) Heerenveen	€11M	30 January 2023	
47	FW	(Brazil) Jeffinho	(Brazil) Botafogo	€10M	31 January 2023	

=== Out ===
No.	Pos.	Player	Transferred to	Fee	Date	Source
Summer
3	DF	(Italy) Emerson	(England) Chelsea	End of loan	30 June 2022	
28	MF	(France) Tanguy Ndombele	(England) Tottenham Hotspur	End of loan	30 June 2022	
5	DF	(Belgium) Jason Denayer	(United Arab Emirates) Shabab Al Ahli	Free	1 July 2022	
16	GK	(Togo) Malcolm Barcola	(Bosnia and Herzegovina) Tuzla City	Free	1 July 2022	
19	MF	(Mali) Habib Keïta	(Belgium) Kortrijk	Loan	1 July 2022	
24	MF	(Senegal) Pape Cheikh Diop	(Greece) Aris	Free	1 July 2022	
32	MF	(France) Titouan Thomas	(Portugal) Estoril	Free	1 July 2022	
43	DF	(Senegal) Abdoulaye Ndiaye	(France) Bastia	Loan	1 July 2022	
52	DF	(France) Hugo Vogel	(Switzerland) Basel	Free	1 July 2022	
14	DF	(France) Léo Dubois	(Turkey) Galatasaray	€2.5M	21 July 2022	
	FW	(France) Lenny Pintor	(France) Saint-Étienne	Free	4 August 2022	
34	FW	(France) Yaya Soumaré	(France) Bourg-en-Bresse	Loan	4 August 2022	
19	DF	(Turkey) Cenk Özkacar	(Spain) Valencia	Loan (€0.5M)	23 August 2022	
10	MF	(Brazil) Lucas Paquetá	(England) West Ham United	€42.95M	29 August 2022	
11	FW	(Zimbabwe) Tino Kadewere	(Spain) Mallorca	Loan (€0.4M)	29 August 2022	
	DF	(Mali) Youssouf Koné	(France) Ajaccio	Loan	30 August 2022	
Winter
	MF	(France) Florent Da Silva	(Netherlands) Volendam	Loan	2 January 2023	
7	FW	(Cameroon) Karl Toko Ekambi	(France) Rennes	Loan (€1.5M)	26 January 2023	
	MF	(Brazil) Camilo	(Belgium) Molenbeek	Loan	28 January 2023	
15	MF	(France) Romain Faivre	(France) Lorient	Loan (€1M)	28 January 2023	
27	DF	(France) Malo Gusto	(England) Chelsea	€35M	29 January 2023	
11	FW	(Brazil) Tetê	(Ukraine) Shakhtar Donetsk	End of loan	29 January 2023	
22	MF	(France) Jeff Reine-Adélaïde	(France) Troyes	Loan	30 January 2023	
30	GK	(Germany) Julian Pollersbeck	(France) Lorient	Loan	31 January 2023	
21	DF	(France) Damien Da Silva	(Australia) Melbourne Victory	Free	3 February 2023	

=== Transfer summary ===
Spending

Summer: ▼€9,450,000

Winter: ▼€21,000,000

Total: ▼€30,450,000

Income

Summer: ▲€46,350,000

Winter: ▲€37,500,000

Total: ▲€78,850,000

Net Expenditure

Summer: ▲€36,900,000

Winter: ▲€16,500,000

Total: ▲€53,400,000

== Pre-season and friendlies ==
Win Draw Loss Fixtures

Lyon started the pre-season on 1 July. Following the pause of Ligue 1 with the 2022 FIFA World Cup taking place, the club returned to training on 25 November, with the participation of players who were not at the World Cup.

9 July 2022 Friendly	Bourg-en-Bresse (France)	2–4	(France) Lyon	Bourg-en-Bresse
19:00 CEST (UTC+2)	Lopy (yellow card) 22'; El Ouazzani 80', 89'	Report	Lacazette 7'; Aouar 49'; Dembélé 57'; Lomami 69'	Stadium: Stade Marcel-Verchère

12 July 2022 Global Tour for Peace	Lyon (France)	1–3	(Ukraine) Dynamo Kyiv	Rennes
18:00 CEST (UTC+2)	El Arouch 59'	Report	Vanat (penalty missed) 19'; Antyukh 25'; Supryaha 56'; Voloshyn 84'	Stadium: Roazhon Park

12 July 2022 Global Tour for Peace	Lyon (France)	3–0	(Ukraine) Dynamo Kyiv	Rennes
21:00 CEST (UTC+2)	Lukeba 52'; Boueye 73'; Lega 76'	Report	Sydorchuk (yellow card) 15'	Stadium: Roazhon Park

16 July 2022 Friendly	Anderlecht (Belgium)	2–3	(France) Lyon	Brussels, Belgium
15:00 CEST (UTC+2)	Colassin 13'; Stassin 73'	Report	Dembélé 36'; Cherki 54'; Augarreau 83'	Stadium: Lotto Park

16 July 2022 Friendly	Anderlecht (Belgium)	3–0	(France) Lyon	Brussels, Belgium
20:00 CEST (UTC+2)	Refaelov 2'; Esposito 62'; Amuzu 83'	Report		Stadium: Lotto Park

23 July 2022 Friendly	Willem II (Netherlands)	5–0	(France) Lyon	Tilburg, Netherlands
16:00 CEST (UTC+2)	Heerkens 21'; Hornkamp 25', 32'; Bokila 48'; Doodeman 60'	Report		Stadium: Koning Willem II Stadion

24 July 2022 Friendly	Feyenoord (Netherlands)	0–2	(France) Lyon	Rotterdam, Netherlands
16:45 CEST (UTC+2)		Report	Lacazette 32'; Reine-Adélaïde 45'; Paquetá (yellow card) 52'	Stadium: De Kuip; Referee: Edwin van de Graaf (Netherlands)

30 July 2022 Friendly	Inter Milan (Italy)	2–2	(France) Lyon	Cesena, Italy
20:30 CEST (UTC+2)	Dumfries (yellow card) 21'; Brozović (yellow card) 36'; Bastoni (yellow card) 40'; Lukaku 51'; Barella 65'	Report	Lacazette 31'; Toko Ekambi (yellow card) 33'; Paquetá (yellow card) 45+1'; Cherki 50'	Stadium: Stadio Dino Manuzzi; Referee: Marco Piccinini (Italy)

1 December 2022 Friendly	Lyon (France)	5–3	(Belgium) OH Leuven	San Pedro del Pinatar, Spain
19:30 CET (UTC+1)	Lacazette 28'; Tetê 33'; Dembélé 55', 81', 84'	Report	González 1', 45', 69' (pen.)	Stadium: Pinatar Arena; Attendance: 0

8 December 2022 Dubai Super Cup	Arsenal (England)	3–0 (2–1 p)	(France) Lyon	Dubai, United Arab Emirates
19:30 GST (UTC+4); 16:30 CET (UTC+1)	Gabriel 19'; Nketiah 33'; Vieira 39'	Report		Stadium: Al Maktoum Stadium; Attendance: 7,451; Referee: Adel Al Naqbi (United Arab Emirates)
	Penalties
	Marquinhos (penalty scored); Smith (penalty scored); Cîrjan (penalty missed); Cozier-Duberry (penalty missed); Walters (penalty missed)		(penalty missed) Reine-Adélaïde; (penalty scored) Mendes; (penalty missed) Tetê; (penalty missed) Barcola; (penalty missed) Cherki
Note: Arsenal gained 4 points from this fixture: 3 for the victory in 90 minutes, and 1 for the penalty shoot-out victory.

11 December 2022 Dubai Super Cup	Liverpool (England)	1–3 (3–5 p)	(France) Lyon	Dubai, United Arab Emirates
18:00 GST (UTC+4); 15:00 CET (UTC+1)	Carvalho 1'; Salah (penalty missed) 14'; Bajcetic (yellow card) 23'	Report	Lacazette 41', 82'; Barcola 65'	Stadium: Al Maktoum Stadium; Attendance: 14,851; Referee: Ahmed Essa Mohamed (United Arab Emirates)
	Penalties
	Tsimikas (penalty scored); Ramsay (penalty missed); Oxlade-Chamberlain (penalty scored); Keïta (penalty scored)		(penalty scored) Caqueret; (penalty scored) Barcola; (penalty scored) Cherki; (penalty scored) Tetê; (penalty scored) Da Silva
Note: Lyon gained 4 points from this fixture: 3 for the victory in 90 minutes, and 1 for the penalty shoot-out victory.

17 December 2022 Friendly	Lyon (France)	1–1	(France) Sochaux	Décines-Charpieu
17:00 CET (UTC+1)	Tolisso 28'; Kumbedi (yellow card) 66'	Report	Sissoko 7'	Stadium: Stade Gérard Houllier

22 December 2022 Friendly	Lyon (France)	1–2	(Italy) Monza	Décines-Charpieu
19:00 CET (UTC+1)	Lacazette (yellow card) 38'; Lukeba 90+3'	Report	Mota 26', (yellow card) 58'; Pessina (yellow card) 48'; Caprari 63'	Stadium: Parc Olympique Lyonnais

== Competitions ==
=== Overall record ===
Competition	First match	Last match	Starting round	Final position	Record							
Competition	First match	Last match	Starting round	Final position	Pld	W	D	L	GF	GA	GD	Win %
Ligue 1	5 August 2022	3 June 2023	Matchday 1	7th	38	18	8	12	65	47	+18	47.37
Coupe de France	7 January 2023	5 April 2023	Round of 64	Semi-finals	5	3	1	1	9	5	+4	60.00
Total					43	21	9	13	74	52	+22	48.84

Source: Soccerway

=== Ligue 1 ===
==== League table ====
Pos	Team	Pld	W	D	L	GF	GA	GD	Pts	Qualification or relegation
5	Lille	38	19	10	9	65	44	+21	67	Qualification for the Europa Conference League play-off round
6	Monaco	38	19	8	11	70	58	+12	65	
7	Lyon	38	18	8	12	65	47	+18	62	
8	Clermont	38	17	8	13	45	49	−4	59	
9	Nice	38	15	13	10	48	37	+11	58	

Source: Ligue 1
Rules for classification: 1) Points; 2) Goal difference; 3) Head-to-head points; 4) Head-to-head goal difference; 5) Head-to-head goals scored; 6) Head-to-head away goals scored; 7) Goals scored; 8) Away goals scored; 9) Fair-play points (Note: Head-to-head record is used only after all the matches between the teams in question have been played).

==== Results summary ====
Overall								Home						Away					
Pld	W	D	L	GF	GA	GD	Pts	W	D	L	GF	GA	GD	W	D	L	GF	GA	GD
38	18	8	12	65	47	+18	62	10	5	4	35	19	+16	8	3	8	30	28	+2

Source: Ligue 1

==== Results by round ====
Round	1	2	3	4	5	6	7	8	9	10	11	12	13	14	15	16	17	18	19	20	21	22	23	24	25	26	27	28	29	30	31	32	33	34	35	36	37	38
Ground	H	A	H	A	H	H	A	H	A	H	A	A	H	A	H	A	H	A	H	A	H	A	H	A	A	H	A	H	A	H	A	H	A	H	A	H	H	A
Result	W	L	W	D	W	W	L	L	L	D	L	W	W	L	D	W	L	D	L	W	D	W	W	L	W	D	D	D	W	W	W	L	W	W	L	W	W	L
Position	7	7	4	4	4	4	5	6	7	9	10	8	8	8	8	8	8	8	9	9	10	9	9	9	9	10	10	10	9	7	7	7	7	7	7	7	7	7

Source: Ligue 1
A = Away; H = Home; W = Win; D = Draw; L = Loss

==== Matches ====
The league fixtures were announced on 17 June 2022.

5 August 2022 1	Lyon	2–1	Ajaccio	Décines-Charpieu
21:00 CEST (UTC+2)	Tetê 12'; Lacazette 22' (pen.), (yellow card) 33'; Lopes (red card) 27'	Report	Avinel (yellow card) 20'; Mangani 31' (pen.); Hamouma (yellow card) 33' (yellow-red card) 45+4'; El Idrissy (yellow card) 34'; Diallo (yellow card) 41'; Spadanuda (yellow card) 90+3'	Stadium: Parc Olympique Lyonnais; Attendance: 48,516; Referee: Benoît Bastien

19 August 2022 3	Lyon	4–1	Troyes	Décines-Charpieu
21:00 CEST (UTC+2)	Lacazette 3'; Tagliafico 47'; Tetê 49', 76'	Report	Tardieu 39' (pen.); Kouamé (yellow card) 52'	Stadium: Parc Olympique Lyonnais; Attendance: 43,000; Referee: Eric Wattellier

28 August 2022 4	Reims	1–1	Lyon	Reims
17:05 CEST (UTC+2)	Ito 24'; Lopy (red card) 63'; Faes (yellow card) 64'; García (yellow card) 71'	Report	Caqueret (yellow card) 48'; Dembélé 86'	Stadium: Stade Auguste-Delaune; Attendance: 14,930; Referee: Jérémy Stinat

31 August 2022 5	Lyon	2–1	Auxerre	Décines-Charpieu
19:00 CEST (UTC+2)	Tetê 29'; Toko Ekambi 72'	Report	Ruiz-Atil (yellow card) 56'; Autret 80'; Perrin (yellow card) 90+2'	Stadium: Parc Olympique Lyonnais; Attendance: 38,609; Referee: Pierre Gallouste

3 September 2022 6	Lyon	5–0	Angers	Décines-Charpieu
19:00 CEST (UTC+2)	Toko Ekambi 31', 59'; Lacazette 38'; Lukeba 62'; Gusto (yellow card) 54'; Tetê (yellow card) 56'; Dembélé 88'	Report	Boufal (yellow card) 68'	Stadium: Parc Olympique Lyonnais; Attendance: 39,586; Referee: Thomas Léonard

7 September 2022 2	Lorient	3–1	Lyon	Lorient
19:00 CEST (UTC+2)	Le Fée 6'; Moffi 33'; Diarra (yellow card) 43'; Ouattara 49'	Report	Mendes (yellow card) 23'; Lacazette 28'; Da Silva (yellow card) 55'; Dembélé (yellow card) 84'	Stadium: Stade du Moustoir; Attendance: 13,685; Referee: Bastien Dechepy
Note: The match was originally scheduled for 14 August 2022 at 13:00, but was postponed for safety reasons due to the poor condition of Lorient's pitch.

11 September 2022 7	Monaco	2–1	Lyon	Monaco
20:45 CEST (UTC+2)	Badiashile 55'; Maripán 63'; Golovin (yellow card) 86'	Report	Lukeba (yellow card) 65'; Lacazette (yellow card) 79'; Toko Ekambi 81'	Stadium: Stade Louis II; Attendance: 7,000; Referee: Clément Turpin

18 September 2022 8	Lyon	0–1	Paris Saint-Germain	Décines-Charpieu
20:45 CEST (UTC+2)		Report	Messi 5'; Verratti (yellow card) 39'; Donnaruma (yellow card) 90+3'	Stadium: Parc Olympique Lyonnais; Attendance: 58,230; Referee: François Letexier

2 October 2022 9	Lens	1–0	Lyon	Lens
20:45 CEST (UTC+2)	Sotoca (yellow card) 78', (goal) 82' (pen.); Saïd (yellow card) 89'	Report	Tagliafico (yellow card) 27'; Reine-Adélaïde (yellow card) 79'	Stadium: Stade Bollaert-Delelis; Attendance: 36,674; Referee: Benoît Bastien

7 October 2022 10	Lyon	1–1	Toulouse	Décines-Charpieu
21:00 CEST (UTC+2)	Tetê 2'; Toko Ekambi (yellow card) 88'; Cherki (yellow card) 90+1'	Report	Dallinga (yellow card) 4'; Aboukhlal (yellow card) 30'; Ratão 67'	Stadium: Parc Olympique Lyonnais; Attendance: 41,295; Referee: Ruddy Buquet

16 October 2022 11	Rennes	3–2	Lyon	Rennes
15:00 CEST (UTC+2)	Xeka (yellow card) 2'; Assignon (yellow card) 34'; Terrier 38', 77'; Gouiri 47'	Report	Tolisso (yellow card) 7'; Lacazette 23', 72'; Aouar (yellow card) 71'	Stadium: Roazhon Park; Attendance: 28,152; Referee: Stéphanie Frappart

22 October 2022 12	Montpellier	1–2	Lyon	Montpellier
17:00 CEST (UTC+2)	Savanier (yellow card) 59'; Wahi 70', (yellow card) 74'; Mavididi (red card) 74'	Report	Aouar (yellow card) 7', (goal) 33'; Mendes (yellow card) 49'; Diomandé (red card) 74'; Lacazette 90'	Stadium: Stade de la Mosson; Attendance: 15,339; Referee: Thomas Léonard

30 October 2022 13	Lyon	1–0	Lille	Décines-Charpieu
20:45 CET (UTC+1)	Da Silva (yellow card) 41'; Lepenant (yellow card) 51'; Lukeba (yellow card) 67'; Lacazette 74'	Report	David (yellow card) 48'	Stadium: Parc Olympique Lyonnais; Attendance: 55,790; Referee: Jérôme Brisard

6 November 2022 14	Marseille	1–0	Lyon	Marseille
20:45 CET (UTC+1)	Gigot 44'	Report	Tetê (yellow card) 90'	Stadium: Stade Vélodrome; Attendance: 62,975; Referee: François Letexier

11 November 2022 15	Lyon	1–1	Nice	Décines-Charpieu
21:00 CET (UTC+1)	Tagliafico (yellow card) 35'; Lacazette 89' (pen.)	Report	Pépé 38' (pen.)	Stadium: Parc Olympique Lyonnais; Attendance: 57,000; Referee: Eric Wattellier

Mid-season break for 2022 FIFA World Cup

28 December 2022 16	Brest	2–4	Lyon	Brest
21:00 CET (UTC+1)	Lage 28'; Chardonnet (yellow card) 33'; Camara (yellow card) 37'; Mounié 71'	Report	Caqueret 20', (yellow card) 43'; Cherki (yellow card) 30', (goal) 31'; Lacazette 34' (pen.); Tetê 48'	Stadium: Stade Francis-Le Blé; Attendance: 14,601; Referee: Bastien Dechepy

1 January 2023 17	Lyon	0–1	Clermont	Décines-Charpieu
17:00 CET (UTC+1)	Kumbedi (yellow card) 70'	Report	Wieteska (yellow card) 5'; Khaoui (yellow card) 45+1'; Cham 86' (pen.), (yellow card) 88'	Stadium: Parc Olympique Lyonnais; Attendance: 30,000; Referee: Stéphanie Frappart

11 January 2023 18	Nantes	0–0	Lyon	Nantes
19:00 CET (UTC+1)	Traoré (yellow card) 68'; Corchia (yellow card) 90+3'	Report	Tetê (yellow card) 53'; Lukeba (yellow card) 75'; Kumbedi (yellow card) 84'	Stadium: Stade de la Beaujoire; Attendance: 27,657; Referee: Marc Bollengier

14 January 2023 19	Lyon	1–2	Strasbourg	Décines-Charpieu
21:00 CET (UTC+1)	Lacazette 45+2' (pen.); Lovren (yellow card) 56'	Report	Aholou 29', (yellow card) 59'; Diallo 32', (yellow card) 60'; Diarra (yellow card) 80'	Stadium: Parc Olympique Lyonnais; Attendance: 38,473; Referee: Jérémy Stinat

29 January 2023 20	Ajaccio	0–2	Lyon	Ajaccio
17:05 CET (UTC+1)	Gonzalez (yellow card) 28'; El Idrissy (yellow card) 53'	Report	Lepenant 20'; Lopes (yellow card) 53'; Kumbedi (yellow card) 57'; Tagliafico (yellow card) 70'; Lacazette 71'	Stadium: Stade François Coty; Attendance: 9,788; Referee: Thomas Léonard

1 February 2023 21	Lyon	0–0	Brest	Décines-Charpieu
21:00 CET (UTC+1)		Report		Stadium: Parc Olympique Lyonnais; Attendance: 30,837; Referee: Ruddy Buquet

4 February 2023 22	Troyes	1–3	Lyon	Troyes
19:00 CET (UTC+1)	Lopes 62'	Report	Tagliafico (yellow card) 25'; Barcola 43'; Cherki 59'; Lacazette 90+3'	Stadium: Stade de l'Aube; Attendance: 10,240; Referee: François Letexier

12 February 2023 23	Lyon	2–1	Lens	Décines-Charpieu
20:45 CET (UTC+1)	Lukeba (yellow card) 14'; Lacazette 23'; Cherki 64'	Report	Machado 39'; Abdul Samed (yellow card) 85'	Stadium: Parc Olympique Lyonnais; Attendance: 53,426; Referee: Eric Wattellier

17 February 2023 24	Auxerre	2–1	Lyon	Auxerre
21:00 CET (UTC+1)	Da Costa (yellow card) 38'; Perrin 51' (pen.); Jubal 53'; Massengo (yellow card) 54'; Touré (yellow card) 68'; Hein (yellow card) 90+4'	Report	Dembélé 36'; Barcola (yellow card) 83'; Lepenant (yellow card) 90+5'	Stadium: Stade de l'Abbé-Deschamps; Attendance: 16,396; Referee: Jérôme Brisard

25 February 2023 25	Angers	1–3	Lyon	Angers
17:00 CET (UTC+1)	Sima 87'	Report	Mendes 38'; A. Sarr 80'; Barcola 90'	Stadium: Stade Raymond Kopa; Attendance: 12,031; Referee: Florent Batta

5 March 2023 26	Lyon	0–0	Lorient	Décines-Charpieu
17:05 CET (UTC+1)	Lukeba (yellow card) 66'	Report		Stadium: Parc Olympique Lyonnais; Attendance: 38,568; Referee: Thomas Léonard

10 March 2023 27	Lille	3–3	Lyon	Villeneuve-d'Ascq
21:00 CET (UTC+1)	Gudmundsson (yellow card) 39'; David 46', 61' (pen.), 79' (pen.); André (yellow card) 72'; Chevalier (yellow card) 75'; Bamba (yellow card) 90+8'; And. Gomes (yellow card) 90+9'	Report	Lepenant (yellow card) 24'; Cherki (yellow card) 60'; Barcola 64'; Lacazette 83', 89'; Kumbedi (yellow card) 85'; Lovren (yellow card) 90+5'	Stadium: Stade Pierre-Mauroy; Attendance: 40,314; Referee: Benoît Bastien

17 March 2022 28	Lyon	1–1	Nantes	Décines-Charpieu
21:00 CET (UTC+1)	Lacazette 24'	Report	Lukeba 2' (o.g.); João Victor (yellow card) 29'	Stadium: Parc Olympique Lyonnais; Attendance: 38,880; Referee: Benoît Millot

2 April 2023 29	Paris Saint-Germain	0–1	Lyon	Paris
20:45 CEST (UTC+2)	Bitshiabu (yellow card) 12'; Donnarumma (yellow card) 36'; Sanches (yellow card) 42'	Report	Lacazette (penalty missed) 39'; Kumbedi (yellow card) 42'; Barcola 56', (yellow card) 90+3'; Tolisso (yellow card) 90+4'	Stadium: Parc des Princes; Attendance: 47,926; Referee: François Letexier

9 April 2023 30	Lyon	3–1	Rennes	Décines-Charpieu
13:00 CEST (UTC+2)	Barcola (yellow card) 26', (goal) 79'; Kumbedi (yellow card) 32'; Tolisso 60'; Lacazette 68'	Report	Gouiri 11'; Theate (yellow card) 34'; Majer (yellow card) 39'	Stadium: Parc Olympique Lyonnais; Attendance: 44,671; Referee: Benoît Bastien

14 April 2023 31	Toulouse	1–2	Lyon	Toulouse
21:00 CEST (UTC+2)	Aboukhlal 37'; Suazo (yellow card) 54'	Report	Jeffinho (yellow card) 15'; Kumbedi (yellow card) 25'; Lacazette 34' (pen.), (yellow card) 87'; Costa 88' (o.g.); Mendes (yellow card) 90+1'	Stadium: Stade de Toulouse; Attendance: 28,302; Referee: François Letexier

23 April 2023 32	Lyon	1–2	Marseille	Décines-Charpieu
20:45 CEST (UTC+2)	Diomandé (yellow card) 30'; Tolisso (yellow card) 56'; Lacazette 68'	Report	Ünder 44'; Kolašinac (yellow card) 55'; Gusto 90+2' (o.g.)	Stadium: Parc Olympique Lyonnais; Attendance: 57,509; Referee: Jérôme Brisard

28 April 2023 33	Strasbourg	1–2	Lyon	Strasbourg
21:00 CEST (UTC+2)	Sanson 15'; Aholou (yellow card) 39'; Djiku (yellow card) 46'	Report	Lukeba 32', (yellow card) 68' (yellow-red card) 90+2'; Diomandé (yellow card) 35'; Caqueret 36'; Kumbedi (yellow card) 79'	Stadium: Stade de la Meinau; Attendance: 25,360; Referee: Ruddy Buquet

7 May 2023 34	Lyon	5–4	Montpellier	Décines-Charpieu
17:05 CEST (UTC+2)	Lacazette 31', 59', 82', 90+10' (pen.); Lovren 70'	Report	Wahi 40', 41', 53' (pen.), 55', (yellow card) 54'; Sacko (yellow card) 89'; Jullien (yellow card) 90+9'	Stadium: Parc Olympique Lyonnais; Attendance: 49,531; Referee: Bastien Dechepy

13 May 2023 35	Clermont	2–1	Lyon	Clermont-Ferrand
17:00 CEST (UTC+2)	Kyei 25' (pen.), 65'; Ogier (yellow card) 29'; Andrić (yellow card) 90+5'; Rashani (yellow card) 90+6'	Report	Lacazette 21', (penalty missed) 90+6'; Lukeba (yellow card) 73'; Tagliafico (yellow card) 84'; Lopes (yellow card) 90+6'	Stadium: Stade Gabriel Montpied; Attendance: 13,191; Referee: Ruddy Buquet

19 May 2023 36	Lyon	3–1	Monaco	Décines-Charpieu
21:00 CEST (UTC+2)	Lacazette 38'; Caqueret 57'; Cherki 78'	Report	Ben Yedder 2' (pen.); Golovin (yellow card) 31'; Jakobs (yellow card) 55'; Vanderson (yellow card) 63'	Stadium: Parc Olympique Lyonnais; Attendance: 53,980; Referee: Benoît Millot

27 May 2023 37	Lyon	3–0	Reims	Décines-Charpieu
21:00 CEST (UTC+2)	Agbadou 1' (o.g.); Lacazette 8'; Lepenant (yellow card) 79'; Caqueret 81'	Report	Agbadou (red card) 53'; Fall (yellow card) 74'	Stadium: Parc Olympique Lyonnais; Attendance: 56,874; Referee: Jérémy Stinat

3 June 2023 38	Nice	3–1	Lyon	Nice
21:00 CEST (UTC+2)	Boateng 5' (o.g.); Laborde 28'; Moffi 33'; Lukeba (yellow card) 49'	Report	Jeffinho 41'	Stadium: Allianz Riviera; Attendance: 25,243; Referee: Eric Wattellier

=== Coupe de France ===
7 January 2023 Round of 64	Lyon	2–1	Metz	Décines-Charpieu
15:30 CET (UTC+1)	Barcola 60'; Candé 77' (o.g.)	Report	Jallow 63'	Stadium: Parc Olympique Lyonnais; Attendance: 29,763; Referee: Florent Batta

21 January 2023 Round of 32	Chambéry	0–3	Lyon	Décines-Charpieu
15:30 CET (UTC+1)		Report	Lacazette 10', 33', 67'; Tagliafico (yellow card) 43'	Stadium: Parc Olympique Lyonnais; Attendance: 18,344; Referee: Gaël Angoula

8 February 2023 Round of 16	Lyon	2–2 (4–2 p)	Lille	Décines-Charpieu
18:15 CET (UTC+1)	Cherki 8'; Lacazette 21'; Barcola (yellow card) 26'; Diomandé (yellow card) 84'	Report	David 29' (pen.), (yellow card) 30'; Zhegrova (yellow card) 29', (goal) 64'; André (yellow card) 75'	Stadium: Parc Olympique Lyonnais; Attendance: 24,779; Referee: Benoît Millot
	Penalties
	Tolisso (penalty scored); Dembélé (penalty scored); Caqueret (penalty scored); Lovren (penalty scored)		(penalty scored) Ang. Gomes; (penalty scored) Cabella; (penalty missed) Bayo; (penalty missed) Weah

28 February 2023 Quarter-finals	Lyon	2–1	Grenoble	Décines-Charpieu
21:10 CET (UTC+1)	Barcola 24'; Jeffinho 38'	Report	Sbaï 74'; Bambock (yellow card) 82'	Stadium: Parc Olympique Lyonnais; Attendance: 34,017; Referee: Stéphanie Frappart

5 April 2023 Semi-finals	Nantes	1–0	Lyon	Nantes
21:10 CEST (UTC+2)	Blas 57'; Girotto (yellow card) 83'	Report	Tolisso (yellow card) 45+4'; Lovren (yellow card) 90+5'	Stadium: Stade de la Beaujoire; Attendance: 34,687; Referee: Bastien Dechepy

== Statistics ==
=== Appearances and goals ===
No.	Pos	Nat	Player	Total		Ligue 1		Coupe de France	
No.	Pos	Nat	Player	Apps	Goals	Apps	Goals	Apps	Goals
Goalkeepers
1	GK	(Portugal) POR	Anthony Lopes	37	0	32	0	5	0
35	GK	(France) FRA	Rémy Riou	7	0	6+1	0	0	0
40	GK	(France) FRA	Kayne Bonnevie	0	0	0	0	0	0
Defenders
2	DF	(Ivory Coast) CIV	Sinaly Diomandé	29	0	22+2	0	5	0
3	DF	(Argentina) ARG	Nicolás Tagliafico	38	1	34	1	3+1	0
4	DF	(France) FRA	Castello Lukeba	38	2	33+1	2	3+1	0
5	DF	(Croatia) CRO	Dejan Lovren	21	1	17	1	4	0
12	DF	(Brazil) BRA	Henrique	10	0	3+4	0	1+2	0
15	DF	(Morocco) MAR	Achraf Laaziri	0	0	0	0	0	0
17	DF	(Germany) GER	Jérôme Boateng	8	0	6+2	0	0	0
20	DF	(France) FRA	Saël Kumbedi	23	0	14+6	0	2+1	0
27	DF	(France) FRA	Malo Gusto	22	0	19+2	0	1	0
29	DF	(France) FRA	Mamadou Sarr	1	0	0+1	0	0	0
Midfielders
6	MF	(France) FRA	Maxence Caqueret	40	4	32+4	4	3+1	0
8	MF	(Algeria) ALG	Houssem Aouar	18	1	6+10	1	0+2	0
23	MF	(Brazil) BRA	Thiago Mendes	34	1	22+9	1	2+1	0
24	MF	(France) FRA	Johann Lepenant	34	1	21+10	1	2+1	0
38	MF	(France) FRA	Mohamed El Arouch	2	0	0+1	0	0+1	0
88	MF	(France) FRA	Corentin Tolisso	34	1	25+5	1	3+1	0
Forwards
7	FW	(Sweden) SWE	Amin Sarr	15	1	6+7	1	1+1	0
9	FW	(France) FRA	Moussa Dembélé	27	3	8+15	3	1+3	0
10	FW	(France) FRA	Alexandre Lacazette	39	31	34+1	27	3+1	4
18	FW	(France) FRA	Rayan Cherki	39	5	21+13	4	5	1
26	FW	(France) FRA	Bradley Barcola	31	7	15+11	5	5	2
33	FW	(Algeria) ALG	Djibrail Dib	0	0	0	0	0	0
36	FW	(France) FRA	Sekou Lega	0	0	0	0	0	0
47	FW	(Brazil) BRA	Jeffinho	11	2	4+5	1	1+1	1
Players transferred out during the season
7	FW	(Cameroon) CMR	Karl Toko Ekambi	19	4	15+4	4	0	0
10	MF	(Brazil) BRA	Lucas Paquetá	2	0	2	0	0	0
11	FW	(Zimbabwe) ZIM	Tino Kadewere	0	0	0	0	0	0
11	FW	(Brazil) BRA	Tetê	19	6	14+3	6	2	0
15	MF	(France) FRA	Romain Faivre	10	0	3+7	0	0	0
19	DF	(Turkey) TUR	Cenk Özkaçar	0	0	0	0	0	0
21	DF	(France) FRA	Damien Da Silva	8	0	3+4	0	1	0
22	MF	(France) FRA	Jeff Reine-Adelaide	14	0	1+13	0	0	0
30	GK	(Germany) GER	Julian Pollersbeck	0	0	0	0	0	0
	MF	(France) FRA	Florent Da Silva	0	0	0	0	0	0

Source: Competitions

=== Goalscorers ===
Rank	No.	Pos.	Nat.	Player	Ligue 1	Coupe de France	Total
1	10	FW	(France)	Alexandre Lacazette	27	4	31
2	26	FW	(France)	Bradley Barcola	5	2	7
3	11	FW	(Brazil)	Tetê	6	0	6
4	18	FW	(France)	Rayan Cherki	4	1	5
5	7	FW	(Cameroon)	Karl Toko Ekambi	4	0	4
5	6	MF	(France)	Maxence Caqueret	4	0	4
7	9	FW	(France)	Moussa Dembélé	3	0	3
8	4	DF	(France)	Castello Lukeba	2	0	2
8	47	FW	(Brazil)	Jeffinho	1	1	2
10	3	DF	(Argentina)	Nicolás Tagliafico	1	0	1
10	8	MF	(Algeria)	Houssem Aouar	1	0	1
10	24	MF	(France)	Johann Lepenant	1	0	1
10	23	MF	(Brazil)	Thiago Mendes	1	0	1
10	7	FW	(Sweden)	Amin Sarr	1	0	1
10	88	MF	(France)	Corentin Tolisso	1	0	1
10	5	DF	(Croatia)	Dejan Lovren	1	0	1
Own goals					2	1	3
Totals					65	9	74

=== Assists ===
Rank	No.	Pos.	Nat.	Player	Ligue 1	Coupe de France	Total
1	26	FW	(France)	Bradley Barcola	8	1	9
2	6	MF	(France)	Maxence Caqueret	7	0	7
3	10	FW	(France)	Alexandre Lacazette	5	1	6
3	18	FW	(France)	Rayan Cherki	6	0	6
5	11	FW	(Brazil)	Tetê	3	2	5
5	3	DF	(Argentina)	Nicolás Tagliafico	3	2	5
7	7	FW	(Cameroon)	Karl Toko Ekambi	2	0	2
7	88	MF	(France)	Corentin Tolisso	2	0	2
7	24	MF	(France)	Johann Lepenant	2	0	2
7	20	DF	(France)	Saël Kumbedi	2	0	2
11
11	23	MF	(Brazil)	Thiago Mendes	1	0	1
11	8	MF	(Algeria)	Houssem Aouar	1	0	1
11	15	MF	(France)	Romain Faivre	1	0	1
11	9	FW	(France)	Moussa Dembélé	0	1	1
11	27	DF	(France)	Malo Gusto	1	0	1
11	47	FW	(Brazil)	Jeffinho	1	0	1
11	12	DF	(Brazil)	Henrique	1	0	1
11	7	FW	(Sweden)	Amin Sarr	1	0	1
Totals					51	7	58

=== Clean sheets ===
Rank	No.	Pos.	Nat.	Player	Ligue 1	Coupe de France	Total
1	1	GK	(Portugal)	Anthony Lopes	8	1	9
2	35	GK	(France)	Rémy Riou	1	0	1
Totals					9	1	10
