= 2020–21 Olympique Lyonnais season =

Olympique Lyonnais
2020–21 season
- Owner: OL Groupe
- President: Jean-Michel Aulas
- Head coach: Rudi Garcia
- Stadium: Parc Olympique Lyonnais
- Ligue 1: 4th
- Coupe de France: Quarter-finals
- Top goalscorer: League: Memphis Depay (20); All: Memphis Depay (22)
- Biggest win: 5–0 vs Saint-Étienne
- Biggest defeat: 2–4 vs Paris Saint-Germain
Home colours	Away colours	Third colours

The 2020–21 season was the 71st season in the existence of Olympique Lyonnais and the club's 32nd consecutive season in the top flight of French football. In addition to the domestic league, Lyon participated in this season's edition of the Coupe de France. The season covered the period from 1 July 2020 to 30 June 2021.

== Players ==
=== First-team squad ===
As of 13 January 2021

Note: Flags indicate national team as defined under FIFA eligibility rules; some limited exceptions apply. Players may hold more than one non-FIFA nationality.

No.	Pos.	Nation	Player
1	GK	POR	Anthony Lopes (vice-captain)
2	DF	CIV	Sinaly Diomandé
3	DF	ALG	Djamel Benlamri
5	DF	BEL	Jason Denayer
6	DF	BRA	Marcelo
7	FW	CMR	Karl Toko Ekambi
8	MF	FRA	Houssem Aouar
10	FW	NED	Memphis Depay (captain)
11	FW	ZIM	Tino Kadewere
12	MF	BRA	Lucas Paquetá
14	DF	FRA	Léo Dubois (3rd captain)

No.	Pos.	Nation	Player
18	FW	FRA	Rayan Cherki
19	DF	TUR	Cenk Özkaçar
20	FW	ALG	Islam Slimani
22	DF	ITA	Mattia De Sciglio (on loan from Juventus)
23	MF	BRA	Thiago Mendes
25	MF	FRA	Maxence Caqueret
26	DF	FRA	Melvin Bard
27	DF	CIV	Maxwel Cornet
30	GK	GER	Julian Pollersbeck
39	MF	BRA	Bruno Guimarães

=== Out on loan ===
Note: Flags indicate national team as defined under FIFA eligibility rules; some limited exceptions apply. Players may hold more than one non-FIFA nationality.

No.	Pos.	Nation	Player
—	GK	CMR	Boris Essele (at FBBP 01)
—	DF	DEN	Joachim Andersen (at Fulham)
—	DF	BEL	Héritier Deyonge (at Utrecht U23)
—	DF	MLI	Youssouf Koné (at Hatayspor)
—	MF	SEN	Pape Cheikh Diop (at Dijon)
—	MF	BRA	Jean Lucas (at Brest)

No.	Pos.	Nation	Player
—	MF	SEN	Ousseynou Ndiaye (at FBBP 01)
—	MF	FRA	Jeff Reine-Adélaïde (at Nice)
—	FW	FRA	Moussa Dembélé (at Atlético Madrid)
—	FW	FRA	Nicolas Fontaine (at Las Rozas)
—	FW	FRA	Lenny Pintor (at Troyes)

== Transfers ==
=== In ===
No.	Pos.	Player	Transferred from	Fee	Date	Source
7	FW	(Cameroon) Karl Toko Ekambi	(Spain) Villarreal	€11.5M	2 June 2020	
11	FW	(Zimbabwe) Tino Kadewere	(France) Le Havre	Loan return	1 August 2020	
19	DF	(Turkey) Cenk Özkaçar	(Turkey) Altay	€1.5M	18 August 2020	
30	GK	(Germany) Julian Pollersbeck	(Germany) Hamburger SV	€250,000	9 September 2020	
12	MF	(Brazil) Lucas Paquetá	(Italy) Milan	€20M	30 September 2020	
22	DF	(Italy) Mattia De Sciglio	(Italy) Juventus	Loan	5 October 2020	
33	FW	(Mali) Habib Keïta	(Mali) Guidars FC	€1M	5 October 2020	
3	DF	(Algeria) Djamel Benlamri	(Saudi Arabia) Al Shabab	Free	6 October 2020	
20	FW	(Algeria) Islam Slimani	(England) Leicester City	Free	13 January 2021	

=== Out ===
No.	Pos.	Player	Transferred to	Fee	Date	Source
29	MF	(France) Lucas Tousart	(Germany) Hertha BSC	End of loan	1 July 2020	
19	FW	(France) Amine Gouiri	(France) Nice	€7M	1 July 2020	
7	FW	(France) Martin Terrier	(France) Rennes	€12M	6 July 2020	
26	DF	(France) Oumar Solet	(Austria) Red Bull Salzburg	€4.5M	17 July 2020	
—	MF	(Senegal) Pape Cheikh Diop	(France) Dijon	Loan	6 August 2020	
20	DF	(Brazil) Marçal	(England) Wolverhampton Wanderers	€2M	6 September 2020	
4	DF	(Brazil) Rafael	(Turkey) İstanbul Başakşehir	Free	8 September 2020	
—	FW	(France) Lenny Pintor	(France) Troyes	Loan extended	9 September 2020	
23	DF	(Netherlands) Kenny Tete	(England) Fulham	€3.2M	10 September 2020	
30	GK	(Romania) Ciprian Tătărușanu	(Italy) Milan	€500,000	11 September 2020	
16	GK	(Switzerland) Anthony Racioppi	(France) Dijon	Free	25 September 2020	
10	FW	(Burkina Faso) Bertrand Traoré	(England) Aston Villa	€20M	19 September 2020	
28	DF	(Mali) Youssouf Koné	(Spain) Elche	Loan	29 September 2020	
3	DF	(Denmark) Joachim Andersen	(England) Fulham	Loan	6 October 2020	
17	MF	(France) Jeff Reine-Adélaïde	(France) Nice	Loan	6 October 2020	
4	MF	(Brazil) Jean Lucas	(France) Brest	Loan	12 January 2021	
9	FW	(France) Moussa Dembélé	(Spain) Atlético Madrid	Loan (€1.5M)	13 January 2021	
28	DF	(Mali) Youssouf Koné	(Turkey) Hatayspor	Loan	1 February 2021	

=== Transfer summary ===
Spending

Summer: ▼€33,250,000

Winter: €0

Total: ▼€33,250,000

Income

Summer: ▲€49,200,000

Winter: ▲€1,500,000

Total: ▲€50,700,000

Net Expenditure

Summer: ▲€15,950,000

Winter: ▲€1,500,000

Total: ▲€17,450,000

== Competitions ==
=== Overall record ===
Competition	First match	Last match	Starting round	Final position	Record							
Competition	First match	Last match	Starting round	Final position	Pld	W	D	L	GF	GA	GD	Win %
Ligue 1	28 August 2020	23 May 2021	Matchday 1	4th	38	22	10	6	81	43	+38	57.89
Coupe de France	9 February 2021	21 April 2021	Round of 64	Quarter-finals	4	2	1	1	12	7	+5	50.00
Total					42	24	11	7	93	50	+43	57.14

Last updated: 23 May 2021
Source: Soccerway

=== Ligue 1 ===
==== League table ====
Pos	Team	Pld	W	D	L	GF	GA	GD	Pts	Qualification or relegation
2	Paris Saint-Germain	38	26	4	8	86	28	+58	82	Qualification for the Champions League group stage
3	Monaco	38	24	6	8	76	42	+34	78	Qualification for the Champions League third qualifying round
4	Lyon	38	22	10	6	81	43	+38	76	Qualification for the Europa League group stage (Note: Since the winners of the 2020–21 Coupe de France, Paris Saint-Germain, qualified for European competition based on league position, the Europa League group stage spot reserved for the cup winners was passed to the fifth-placed team, and the Europa Conference League play-off round spot was passed to the sixth-placed team.)
5	Marseille	38	16	12	10	54	47	+7	60	Qualification for the Europa League group stage
6	Rennes	38	16	10	12	52	40	+12	58	Qualification for the Europa Conference League play-off round

Source: Ligue 1
Rules for classification: 1) Points; 2) Goal difference; 3) Goals scored; 4) Head-to-head goal difference; 5) Fairplay ranking.

==== Results summary ====
Overall								Home						Away					
Pld	W	D	L	GF	GA	GD	Pts	W	D	L	GF	GA	GD	W	D	L	GF	GA	GD
38	22	10	6	81	43	+38	76	11	3	5	42	23	+19	11	7	1	39	20	+19

Last updated: 23 May 2021.
Source: Ligue 1

==== Results by round ====
Round	1	2	3	4	5	6	7	8	9	10	11	12	13	14	15	16	17	18	19	20	21	22	23	24	25	26	27	28	29	30	31	32	33	34	35	36	37	38
Ground	A	H	A	H	A	H	A	H	A	H	A	H	A	A	H	A	H	H	A	H	A	H	A	H	H	A	A	H	A	H	A	H	A	H	A	H	A	H
Result	L	W	D	D	D	D	W	W	D	W	W	W	W	W	D	W	W	W	D	L	W	W	W	W	L	W	D	W	D	L	D	W	W	L	W	W	W	L
Position	15	8	11	12	11	14	9	6	6	5	3	3	3	2	3	2	1	1	1	3	3	2	2	2	3	2	3	3	3	3	4	4	4	4	4	4	4	4

Source: Ligue 1
A = Away; H = Home; W = Win; D = Draw; L = Loss

==== Matches ====
The league fixtures were announced on 9 July 2020.

28 August 2020 2	Lyon	4–1	Dijon	Décines-Charpieu
21:00 CEST (UTC+2)	Depay 39' (pen.), 45+1', 65' (pen.), (yellow card) 68'; Lautoa 45' (o.g.); Dembélé (yellow card) 80'; Marcelo (yellow card) 90+2'	Report	Scheidler 14'; Ngouyamsa (yellow card) 38'; Ndong (yellow card) 45+1'; Sammaritano (yellow card) 65'	Stadium: Parc Olympique Lyonnais; Referee: Benoît Millot

11 September 2020 3	Bordeaux	0–0	Lyon	Bordeaux
21:00 CEST (UTC+2)	Otávio (yellow card) 55'; Briand (yellow card) 80'	Report	Dembélé (yellow card) 22'; Marcelo (yellow card) 30'; Andersen (yellow card) 68'	Stadium: Matmut Atlantique; Referee: Ruddy Buquet

15 September 2020 1	Montpellier	2–1	Lyon	Montpellier
21:00 CEST (UTC+2)	Delort (yellow card) 7'; Savanier 38' (pen.), 59'; Ferri (yellow card) 62'; Hilton (yellow card) 71', (red card) 81'	Report	Bruno Guimarães (yellow card) 36'; Aouar (red card) 44'; Toko Ekambi (yellow card) 45+2'; Depay 82' (pen.)	Stadium: Stade de la Mosson; Referee: Frank Schneider
Note: The match was originally scheduled for 23 August, but was postponed due to Lyon's involvement in the 2019–20 UEFA Champions League knockout phase.

18 September 2020 4	Lyon	0–0	Nîmes	Décines-Charpieu
21:00 CEST (UTC+2)	Cornet (yellow card) 34'; Dubois (yellow card) 52'; Jean Lucas (yellow card) 90+4'	Report	Cubas (yellow card) 48'; Fomba (yellow card) 68'	Stadium: Parc Olympique Lyonnais; Referee: Amaury Delerue

27 September 2020 5	Lorient	1–1	Lyon	Lorient
17:00 CEST (UTC+2)	Hamel (yellow card) 54'; Wissa 63'; Nardi (yellow card) 90+5'	Report	Dubois 74'	Stadium: Stade du Moustoir; Referee: Clément Turpin

4 October 2020 6	Lyon	1–1	Marseille	Décines-Charpieu
21:00 CEST (UTC+2)	Aouar 28' (pen.); Bruno Guimarães (yellow card) 86'	Report	Ćaleta-Car (yellow card) 4'; Payet 16', (red card) 19'	Stadium: Parc Olympique Lyonnais; Referee: Stéphanie Frappart

18 October 2020 7	Strasbourg	2–3	Lyon	Strasbourg
13:00 CEST (UTC+2)	Diallo 44'; Aholou 55', (yellow card) 90+2'; Ajorque (yellow card) 57'	Report	Kadewere 12', (yellow card) 20'; Toko Ekambi 25', 42', (yellow card) 52'; Cornet (yellow card) 45+1'	Stadium: Stade de la Meinau; Referee: Ruddy Buquet

25 October 2020 8	Lyon	4–1	Monaco	Décines-Charpieu
21:00 CET (UTC+1)	Depay 12'; Kadewere (yellow card) 22'; Toko Ekambi 34', 44'; Aouar 41' (pen.); Diomandé (yellow card) 73'; Mendes (yellow card) 82'; Bard (red card) 88'	Report	Sidibé (yellow card) 39'; Ben Yedder 47' (pen.), (yellow card) 90+3'; Matsima (yellow card) 50'; Aguilar (yellow card) 55'	Stadium: Parc Olympique Lyonnais; Referee: Jérôme Brisard

1 November 2020 9	Lille	1–1	Lyon	Villeneuve-d'Ascq
21:00 CET (UTC+1)	Bamba 22'; Fonte (yellow card) 28'; Yılmaz (yellow card) 41'; Soumaoro (yellow card) 89'	Report	Marcelo (yellow card) 3' (yellow-red card) 50'; Toko Ekambi (yellow card) 33'; Çelik 41' (o.g.)	Stadium: Stade Pierre-Mauroy; Attendance: 0 Referee: Mikael Lesage

8 November 2020 10	Lyon	2–1	Saint-Étienne	Décines-Charpieu
21:00 CET (UTC+1)	Caqueret (yellow card) 42'; Bruno Guimarães (yellow card) 51'; Kadewere 65', 74'; Cornet (yellow card) 68'; Paquetá (yellow card) 84'; Mendes (yellow card) 90+6'	Report	Lopes 40' (o.g.); Youssouf (yellow card) 53'; Gourna-Douath (yellow card) 65'; Bouanga (penalty missed) 88'; Moueffek (yellow card) 90+6'	Stadium: Parc Olympique Lyonnais; Attendance: 0 Referee: François Letexier

22 November 2020 11	Angers	0–1	Lyon	Angers
17:00 CET (UTC+1)	Doumbia (yellow card) 47'; Pereira Lage (yellow card) 59'	Report	Cherki (yellow card) 32'; De Sciglio (yellow card) 70'; Kadewere 78'; Mendes (yellow card) 85'	Stadium: Stade Raymond Kopa; Attendance: 0 Referee: Amaury Delerue

29 November 2020 12	Lyon	3–0	Reims	Décines-Charpieu
13:00 CET (UTC+1)	Toko Ekambi 22'; Bruno Guimarães 49'; Cornet (yellow card) 62'; Dembélé 66', (yellow card) 82'	Report	Touré (yellow card) 14'; Cassamá (red card) 32'	Stadium: Parc Olympique Lyonnais; Attendance: 0 Referee: Jérôme Miguelgorry

6 December 2020 13	Metz	1–3	Lyon	Metz
21:00 CET (UTC+1)	Boulaya (penalty missed) 7', 76'; Sarr (yellow card) 29'; Boye (red card) 87'	Report	Depay 17'; Toko Ekambi 47', 60'; Cherki (red card) 90+3'	Stadium: Stade Saint-Symphorien; Attendance: 0 Referee: Karim Abed

13 December 2020 14	Paris Saint-Germain	0–1	Lyon	Paris
21:00 CET (UTC+1)	Kehrer (yellow card) 46'; Paredes (yellow card) 56'; Neymar (yellow card) 71'; Kimpembe (yellow card) 90+5'	Report	Kadewere 35'; Dubois (yellow card) 38'; Mendes (red card) 90+9'	Stadium: Parc des Princes; Attendance: 0 Referee: Benoît Bastien

16 December 2020 15	Lyon	2–2	Brest	Décines-Charpieu
21:00 CET (UTC+1)	De Sciglio (yellow card) 15'; Depay 69' (pen.); Cornet 81'; Lopes (yellow card) 90'; Paquetá (yellow card) 90+6'	Report	Lopes 39' (o.g.); Lasne (red card) 74'; Faivre 90+2' (pen.)	Stadium: Parc Olympique Lyonnais; Attendance: 0 Referee: Jérôme Brisard

19 December 2020 16	Nice	1–4	Lyon	Nice
21:00 CET (UTC+1)	Gouiri 44'; Thuram (yellow card) 57'	Report	Depay 32' (pen.); Kadewere 39'; Toko Ekambi 63'; Cornet (yellow card) 66'; Aouar 73'	Stadium: Allianz Riviera; Attendance: 0 Referee: Antony Gautier

23 December 2020 17	Lyon	3–0	Nantes	Décines-Charpieu
21:00 CET (UTC+1)	Toko Ekambi 4'; Marcelo (yellow card) 14'; Kadewere 37'; Paquetá 44'	Report	Coco (yellow card) 34'; Abeid (yellow card) 56'; Pallois (yellow card) 68'	Stadium: Parc Olympique Lyonnais; Attendance: 0 Referee: Ruddy Buquet

6 January 2021 18	Lyon	3–2	Lens	Décines-Charpieu
21:00 CET (UTC+1)	Depay 39', 52' (pen.); Aouar (yellow card) 40'; Fortés 46' (o.g.)	Report	Leca (yellow card) 51'; Sotoca 56'; Badé (yellow card) 85'; Doucouré 89'	Stadium: Parc Olympique Lyonnais; Attendance: 0 Referee: Eric Wattellier

9 January 2021 19	Rennes	2–2	Lyon	Rennes
21:00 CET (UTC+1)	Grenier 20'; Bourigeaud 55', (yellow card) 87'	Report	Aouar (yellow card) 14'; Paquetá (yellow card) 54'; Depay 79'; Denayer 82'	Stadium: Roazhon Park; Attendance: 0 Referee: Mikael Lesage

17 January 2021 20	Lyon	0–1	Metz	Décines-Charpieu
21:00 CET (UTC+1)	Dubois (yellow card) 27'	Report	Boye (yellow card) 27'; Kouyaté (yellow card) 86'; Leya Iseka 90', (yellow card) 90'	Stadium: Parc Olympique Lyonnais; Attendance: 0 Referee: Stéphanie Frappart

24 January 2021 21	Saint-Étienne	0–5	Lyon	Saint-Étienne
21:00 CET (UTC+1)	Kolodziejczak (yellow card) 54'; Hamouma (yellow card) 74'; Bouanga (yellow card) 84'	Report	Kadewere 16', 68'; Bruno Guimarães (yellow card) 23'; Marcelo 36', 59'; Bouanga 82' (o.g.)	Stadium: Stade Geoffroy-Guichard; Attendance: 0 Referee: Benoît Bastien

29 January 2021 22	Lyon	2–1	Bordeaux	Décines-Charpieu
21:00 CET (UTC+1)	Mendes (yellow card) 15'; Toko Ekambi 32'; Dubois 90+1'	Report	Kalu 55'; Benito (yellow card) 83'; Bašić (yellow card) 84'	Stadium: Parc Olympique Lyonnais; Attendance: 0 Referee: Clément Turpin

3 February 2021 23	Dijon	0–1	Lyon	Dijon
21:00 CET (UTC+1)	Chouiar (yellow card) 61'; Coulibaly (yellow card) 74'	Report	Paquetá 21'	Stadium: Stade Gaston Gérard; Attendance: 0 Referee: Johan Hamel

6 February 2021 24	Lyon	3–0	Strasbourg	Décines-Charpieu
19:00 CET (UTC+1)	Depay 20', 68'; Toko Ekambi 30'; Marcelo (yellow card) 41'; Diomandé (yellow card) 61'	Report	Thomasson (yellow card) 14' (yellow-red card) 14'	Stadium: Parc Olympique Lyonnais; Attendance: 0 Referee: Amaury Delerue

13 February 2021 25	Lyon	1–2	Montpellier	Décines-Charpieu
21:00 CET (UTC+1)	Paquetá 45+1'	Report	Savanier 20'; Ristić (yellow card) 49'; Wahi 65'	Stadium: Parc Olympique Lyonnais; Attendance: 0 Referee: Antony Gautier

19 February 2021 26	Brest	2–3	Lyon	Brest
21:00 CET (UTC+1)	Belkebla (yellow card) 40'; Chardonnet 53'; Cardona 74'	Report	Paquetá 9', (yellow card) 90+5'; Aouar 29'; Depay 44' (pen.); De Sciglio (yellow card) 56'	Stadium: Stade Francis-Le Blé; Attendance: 0 Referee: Frank Schneider

28 February 2021 27	Marseille	1–1	Lyon	Marseille
21:00 CET (UTC+1)	Milik 44' (pen.); Kamara (yellow card) 64'; Payet (yellow card) 78'; Álvaro (yellow card) 81'; Gueye (yellow card) 90+4'	Report	Toko Ekambi 21'; Paquetá (yellow card) 42' (yellow-red card) 71'; Mendes (yellow card) 78'; Depay (yellow card) 81'	Stadium: Stade Vélodrome; Attendance: 0 Referee: Benoît Millot

3 March 2021 28	Lyon	1–0	Rennes	Décines-Charpieu
19:00 CET (UTC+1)	Caqueret (yellow card) 41'; Aouar 74'	Report	Martin (yellow card) 54'; Grenier (yellow card) 61'; Traoré (yellow card) 76'	Stadium: Parc Olympique Lyonnais; Attendance: 0 Referee: Ruddy Buquet

12 March 2021 29	Reims	1–1	Lyon	Reims
21:00 CET (UTC+1)	Cafaro 33', (yellow card) 43'; Abdelhamid (yellow card) 61'; Munetsi (yellow card) 68'	Report	Depay (yellow card) 30'; Kadewere 90+2'	Stadium: Stade Auguste-Delaune; Attendance: 0 Referee: Jérôme Brisard

21 March 2021 30	Lyon	2–4	Paris Saint-Germain	Décines-Charpieu
21:00 CET (UTC+1)	Kadewere (yellow card) 40'; Slimani 62'; Cornet 81'; Diomandé (yellow card) 90+1'	Report	Mbappé 15', 52'; Pereira 32'; Di María 47'	Stadium: Parc Olympique Lyonnais; Attendance: 0 Referee: Clément Turpin

3 April 2021 31	Lens	1–1	Lyon	Lens
21:00 CEST (UTC+2)	Fortès (yellow card) 6'; Clauss 65'; Sotoca (yellow card) 70'; Michelin (yellow card) 87'	Report	Bruno Guimarães (yellow card) 7'; Depay (yellow card) 48'; De Sciglio (yellow card) 79'; Paquetá 81'; Slimani (red card) 90'	Stadium: Stade Bollaert-Delelis; Attendance: 0 Referee: Benoît Millot

11 April 2021 32	Lyon	3–0	Angers	Décines-Charpieu
21:00 CEST (UTC+2)	Depay 21', 83'; Paquetá 41'	Report		Stadium: Parc Olympique Lyonnais; Attendance: 0 Referee: Mikael Lesage

18 April 2021 33	Nantes	1–2	Lyon	Nantes
21:00 CEST (UTC+2)	Pallois 60'	Report	Depay 5', 37' (pen.); Denayer (yellow card) 67'	Stadium: Stade de la Beaujoire; Attendance: 0 Referee: Benoît Bastien

25 April 2021 34	Lyon	2–3	Lille	Décines-Charpieu
21:00 CEST (UTC+2)	Slimani 20'; Fonte 35' (o.g.)	Report	André (yellow card) 43'; Yılmaz 45+1', 85', (yellow card) 86'; David 60'; Yazıcı (yellow card) 90+1'	Stadium: Parc Olympique Lyonnais; Attendance: 0 Referee: François Letexier

2 May 2021 35	Monaco	2–3	Lyon	Monaco
21:00 CEST (UTC+2)	Volland 25'; Fofana (yellow card) 63'; Ben Yedder 86' (pen.); Geubbels (red card) 90+5'; Pellegri (red card) 90+5'	Report	Caqueret (yellow card) 30' (yellow-red card) 70'; Depay 57'; Kadewere (yellow card) 72'; Marcelo 77', (red card) 90+5'; Lopes (yellow card) 86'; Cherki 89'; De Sciglio (red card) 90+5'	Stadium: Stade Louis II; Attendance: 0 Referee: Clément Turpin
Note: Geubbels, Pellegri, Marcelo and De Sciglio received red cards after the final whistle.

8 May 2021 36	Lyon	4–1	Lorient	Décines-Charpieu
17:00 CEST (UTC+2)	Bruno Guimarães (yellow card) 18', (goal) 71' (pen.), 77'; Aouar (yellow card) 41', (goal) 53'; Paquetá 65'	Report	Lemoine (yellow card) 69'; Hamel (yellow card) 79'; Monconduit 83'	Stadium: Parc Olympique Lyonnais; Attendance: 0 Referee: Mikael Lesage

16 May 2021 37	Nîmes	2–5	Lyon	Nîmes
21:00 CEST (UTC+2)	Koné 5', 62'	Report	Paquetá 8', 24'; Depay 20'; Aouar 55'; Slimani 87'	Stadium: Stade des Costières; Attendance: 0 Referee: Ruddy Buquet

23 May 2021 38	Lyon	2–3	Nice	Décines-Charpieu
21:00 CEST (UTC+2)	Toko Ekambi 14', 40'; Marcelo (yellow card) 56'	Report	Dolberg 27'; Thuram (yellow card) 45+1'; Kamara 50'; Saliba 57'; Todibo (yellow card) 65'	Stadium: Parc Olympique Lyonnais; Attendance: 0 Referee: Benoît Millot

=== Coupe de France ===
9 February 2021 Round of 64	Lyon	5–1	Ajaccio	Décines-Charpieu
21:00 CET (UTC+1)	Depay 10'; Slimani 22'; Cornet 24'; Cherki 38'; Aouar 79' (pen.)	Report	Nouri 90' (pen.)	Stadium: Parc Olympique Lyonnais; Attendance: 0 Referee: Florent Batta

6 March 2021 Round of 32	Lyon	5–2	Sochaux	Décines-Charpieu
18:45 CET (UTC+1)	Benlamri 8', (yellow card) 30'; Cornet 10'; Cherki 45', 87'; Denayer 77'	Report	Ndour (yellow card) 40'; Bedia 41', 56'	Stadium: Parc Olympique Lyonnais; Attendance: 0 Referee: Eric Wattellier

8 April 2021 Round of 16	Red Star	2–2 (4–5 p)	Lyon	Saint-Ouen-sur-Seine
19:00 CEST (UTC+2)	Daillet (yellow card) 48'; Ba 61'; Roye 74'; Michel (yellow card) 90'	Report	Paquetá 28', (yellow card) 86'; Depay 45'; Cherki (yellow card) 68'	Stadium: Stade Bauer; Attendance: 0 Referee: Jérôme Miguelgorry
	Penalties
	Ba (penalty scored); Durand (penalty scored); Dzabana (penalty scored); Michel (penalty missed); N'Doye (penalty scored)		(penalty scored) Bruno Guimarães; (penalty scored) Paquetá; (penalty scored) Marcelo; (penalty scored) Denayer; (penalty scored) Toko Ekambi

21 April 2021 Quarter-finals	Lyon	0–2	Monaco	Décines-Charpieu
21:10 CEST (UTC+2)	Diomandé (yellow card) 7' (yellow-red card) 51'; Mendes (yellow card) 9'; Paquetá (yellow card) 49'; De Sciglio (yellow card) 57'; Depay (yellow card) 68'	Report	Volland (yellow card) 1', (goal) 61'; Ben Yedder 54' (pen.); Ballo-Touré (yellow card) 56'	Stadium: Parc Olympique Lyonnais; Attendance: 0 Referee: Stéphanie Frappart

== Statistics ==
=== Appearances and goals ===
No.	Pos	Nat	Player	Total		Ligue 1		Coupe de France	
No.	Pos	Nat	Player	Apps	Goals	Apps	Goals	Apps	Goals
Goalkeepers
1	GK	(Portugal) POR	Anthony Lopes	39	0	38	0	1	0
30	GK	(Germany) GER	Julian Pollersbeck	3	0	0	0	3	0
Defenders
2	DF	(Ivory Coast) CIV	Sinaly Diomandé	31	0	10+17	0	4	0
3	DF	(Algeria) ALG	Djamel Benlamri	8	1	0+6	0	2	1
5	DF	(Belgium) BEL	Jason Denayer	33	2	31	1	0+2	1
6	DF	(Brazil) BRA	Marcelo	37	3	34	3	2+1	0
14	DF	(France) FRA	Léo Dubois	40	2	35+2	2	1+2	0
17	DF	(France) FRA	Malo Gusto	2	0	0+2	0	0	0
19	DF	(Turkey) TUR	Cenk Özkaçar	1	0	0	0	0+1	0
22	DF	(Italy) ITA	Mattia De Sciglio	33	0	14+15	0	4	0
26	DF	(France) FRA	Melvin Bard	18	0	4+10	0	4	0
27	DF	(Ivory Coast) CIV	Maxwel Cornet	39	4	29+7	2	3	2
Midfielders
8	MF	(France) FRA	Houssem Aouar	33	8	23+7	7	1+2	1
12	MF	(Brazil) BRA	Lucas Paquetá	34	10	27+3	9	3+1	1
23	MF	(Brazil) BRA	Thiago Mendes	34	0	23+9	0	1+1	0
25	MF	(France) FRA	Maxence Caqueret	33	0	19+10	0	3+1	0
28	MF	(France) FRA	Florent Da Silva	1	0	0+1	0	0	0
33	MF	(Mali) MLI	Habib Keita	1	0	0+1	0	0	0
39	MF	(Brazil) BRA	Bruno Guimarães	37	3	21+12	3	3+1	0
Forwards
7	FW	(Cameroon) CMR	Karl Toko Ekambi	39	14	34+1	14	0+4	0
10	FW	(Netherlands) NED	Memphis Depay	40	22	33+4	20	3	2
11	FW	(Zimbabwe) ZIM	Tino Kadewere	33	10	24+9	10	0	0
18	FW	(France) FRA	Rayan Cherki	30	4	5+22	1	3	3
20	FW	(Algeria) ALG	Islam Slimani	21	4	4+14	3	2+1	1
29	FW	(France) FRA	Yaya Soumaré	4	0	0+3	0	0+1	0
Players transferred out during the season
3	DF	(Denmark) DEN	Joachim Andersen	2	0	1+1	0	0	0
4	MF	(Brazil) BRA	Jean Lucas	7	0	1+6	0	0	0
9	FW	(France) FRA	Moussa Dembélé	16	1	6+10	1	0	0
17	MF	(France) FRA	Jeff Reine-Adélaïde	1	0	0+1	0	0	0
20	DF	(Brazil) BRA	Marçal	1	0	1	0	0	0
23	DF	(Netherlands) NED	Kenny Tete	1	0	0+1	0	0	0

Last updated: 23 May 2021
Source: Competitions

=== Goalscorers ===
As of 2 May 2021

Rank	No.	Pos.	Nat.	Player	Ligue 1	Coupe de France	Total
1	10	FW	(Netherlands)	Memphis Depay	19	2	21
2	7	FW	(Cameroon)	Karl Toko Ekambi	12	0	12
3	11	FW	(Zimbabwe)	Tino Kadewere	10	0	10
4	12	MF	(Brazil)	Lucas Paquetá	6	1	7
5	8	MF	(France)	Houssem Aouar	5	1	6
6	18	MF	(France)	Rayan Cherki	1	3	4
6	27	FW	(Ivory Coast)	Maxwel Cornet	2	2	4
8	6	DF	(Brazil)	Marcelo	3	0	3
8	20	FW	(Algeria)	Islam Slimani	2	1	3
10	5	DF	(Belgium)	Jason Denayer	1	1	2
10	14	DF	(France)	Léo Dubois	2	0	2
12	3	DF	(Algeria)	Djamel Benlamri	0	1	1
12	9	FW	(France)	Moussa Dembélé	1	0	1
12	39	MF	(Brazil)	Bruno Guimarães	1	0	1
Own goals					5	0	5
Totals					70	12	82
