= Saël Kumbedi =

French footballer (born 2005)

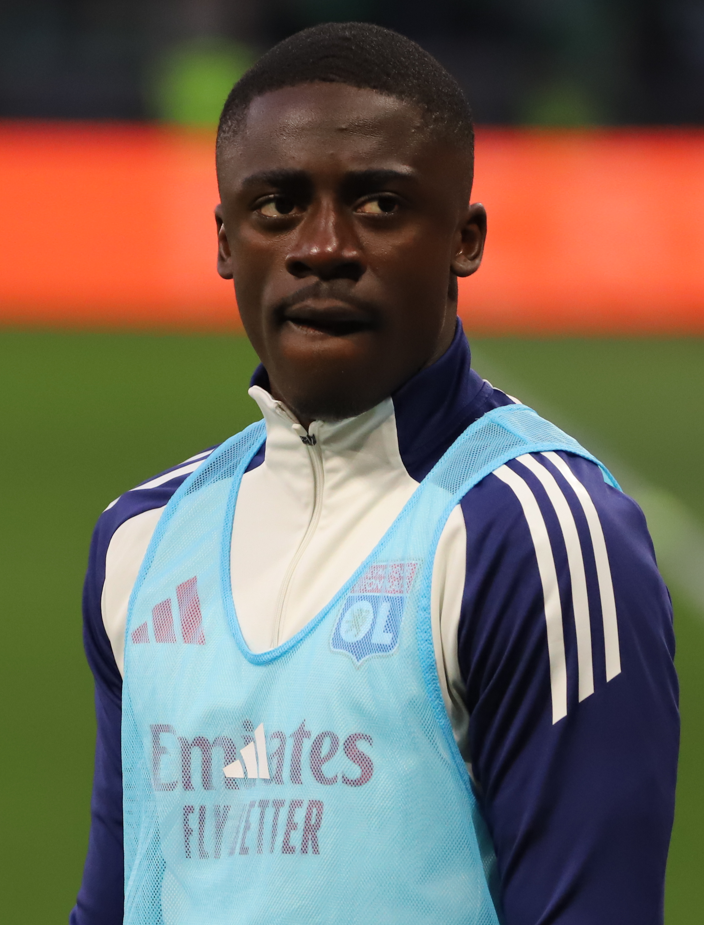
- Kumbedi with Lyon in 2025

Personal information
- Full name: Saël Kumbedi Nseke
- Date of birth: 26 March 2005 (age 21)
- Place of birth: Stains, France
- Height: 1.75 m (5 ft 9 in)
- Position: Right-back

Team information
- Current team: VfL Wolfsburg
- Number: 26

Youth career
- 2015–2018: Paris Saint-Germain
- 2018–2019: CC Taverny
- 2019–2022: Le Havre

Senior career*
Years	Team	Apps	(Gls)
2021–2022	Le Havre B	9	(0)
2021–2022	Le Havre	6	(0)
2022–2024	Lyon B	6	(0)
2022–2025	Lyon	52	(0)
2025	→ VfL Wolfsburg (loan)	9	(0)
2026–	VfL Wolfsburg	18	(0)

International career^{‡}
2021–2022	France U17	15	(2)
2022–2023	France U18	7	(3)
2023–2024	France U19	17	(0)
2024–2025	France U20	6	(0)
2024–	France U21	9	(0)
2026–	France	2	(0)
Medal record
Men's football
Representing France
UEFA European Under-19 Championship
Runner-up	2024 Northern Ireland
UEFA European Under-17 Championship
Winner	2022 Israel
- * Club domestic league appearances and goals as of 18 September 2026 ‡ National team caps and goals as of 15 November 2026

Saël Kumbedi Nseke (born 26 March 2005) is a French professional footballer who plays as a right-back for 2. Bundesliga club VfL Wolfsburg and the France national team.

== Club career ==
A former youth academy player of Paris Saint-Germain and CC Taverny, Kumbedi joined Le Havre in 2019. He made his senior team debut for the club on 13 November 2021 in a 2–0 cup win against Vierzon.

=== Olympique Lyon ===
On 31 August 2022, Kumbedi signed a three-year contract with Olympique Lyon until June 2025.

=== VfL Wolfsburg ===
On 28 August 2025, Kumbedi moved to Bundesliga side VfL Wolfsburg on a one-year loan deal with an option to buy for €6 million. On 22 December, Wolfsburg triggered the purchase option, making Kumbedi a permanent signing.

== International career ==
Kumbedi has represented France at various youth levels. In April 2022, he was named in the France under-17 team squad for the 2022 UEFA European Under-17 Championship. On 1 June 2022, he scored two goals in the final of the tournament in a 2–1 win against the Netherlands.

In November 2026, Kumbedi received his first call-up to the France national team after Pierre Kalulu withdrew from the squad due to injury. He made his debut on 12 November in a 3–1 loss to Italy. This made him the first player to earn a France cap while playing for a second-division club since David Trezeguet in February 2007.

== Personal life ==
Kumbedi is of Congolese descent.

== Career statistics ==
=== Club ===
As of match played 18 September 2026

Appearances and goals by club, season and competition
Club	Season	League			National cup (Note: Includes Coupe de France, DFB-Pokal)		Europe		Total	
Club	Season	Division	Apps	Goals	Apps	Goals	Apps	Goals	Apps	Goals
Le Havre B	2022–23	National 3	9	0	—		—		9	0
Le Havre	2021–22	Ligue 2	2	0	1	0	—		3	0
Le Havre	2022–23	Ligue 2	4	0	0	0	—		4	0
Le Havre	Total		6	0	1	0	—		7	0
Lyon B	2022–23	National 3	3	0	0	0	—		3	0
Lyon	2022–23	Ligue 1	20	0	2	0	—		22	0
Lyon	2023–24	Ligue 1	17	0	2	0	—		19	0
Lyon	2024–25	Ligue 1	16	0	1	0	4 (Note: Appearances in UEFA Europa League)	0	21	0
Lyon	2025–26	Ligue 1	1	0	0	0	0	0	1	0
Lyon	Total		54	0	5	0	4	0	63	0
VfL Wolfsburg (loan)	2025–26	Bundesliga	9	0	1	0	—		10	0
VfL Wolfsburg	2025–26	Bundesliga	15	0	—		—		15	0
VfL Wolfsburg	2026–27	2. Bundesliga	3	0	1	0	—		4	0
VfL Wolfsburg	Total		18	0	1	0	—		19	0
Career total			99	0	8	0	4	0	111	0

=== International ===
As of match played 15 November 2026

Appearances and goals by national team and year
National team	Year	Apps	Goals
France	2026	2	0
Total		2	0

== Honours ==
Lyon

- Coupe de France runner-up: 2023–24

France U17

- UEFA European Under-17 Championship: 2022

France U19

- UEFA European Under-19 Championship runner-up: 2024

France U20

- Maurice Revello Tournament: 2025
