= 2025 UEFA Nations League Finals =

Endrunde der UEFA Nations League 2024/25 (in German)

Tournament details
- Host country: Germany
- Dates: 4–8 June
- Teams: 4
- Venues: 2 (in 2 host cities)

Final positions
- Champions: Portugal (2nd title)
- Runners-up: Spain
- Third place: France
- Fourth place: Germany

Tournament statistics
- Matches played: 4
- Goals scored: 18 (4.5 per match)
- Attendance: 234,712 (58,678 per match)
- Top scorers: (France) Kylian Mbappé; (Portugal) Cristiano Ronaldo; (Spain) Lamine Yamal; (2 goals each)
- Best player: (Portugal) Nuno Mendes

The 2025 UEFA Nations League Finals was the final tournament of the 2024–25 edition of the UEFA Nations League, the fourth season of the international football competition involving the men's national teams of the 55 member associations of UEFA. The tournament was held from 4 to 8 June 2025 in Germany, and was contested by the four quarter-final winners from Nations League A. The tournament consisted of two semi-finals, a third place play-off and final to determine the champions of the UEFA Nations League.

Spain were the defending champions, having won the 2023 finals. Portugal won the final against Spain on penalties, following a 2–2 draw after extra time, for their second Nations League title.

== Format ==
The Nations League Finals took place in June 2025 and was contested by the four winners of the League A quarter-finals, the newly introduced round for the 2024–25 season.

The Nations League Finals took place over five days and were played in single-leg knockout matches, which consisted of two semi-finals on 4 and 5 June (the first of which features the hosts), and a third place play-off and final on 8 June 2025. The semi-final pairings were determined by means of an open draw. All matches in the tournament utilised the goal-line technology and video assistant referee (VAR) systems.

In the Nations League Finals, if the scores were level at the end of normal time:

- In the semi-finals and final, 30 minutes of extra time would be played. If the score is still level after extra time, the winners would be determined by a penalty shoot-out.
- In the third place play-off, extra time would not be played, and the winners would be determined by a penalty shoot-out.

== Qualified teams ==
The four winners of the League A quarter-finals qualified for the Nations League Finals. The three previous champions all managed to qualify for the tournament. They were joined by hosts Germany, who made their first appearance in the tournament. This was the first time any previous winners had qualified for the Nations League Finals after their triumph.

Quarter-final winners	Date of qualification	Previous UNL Finals appearances (Note: Asterisk (*) indicates host for that year.)	Previous best UNL performance	UNL Rankings November 2024	FIFA Rankings April 2025
Spain	23 March 2025	2 (2021, 2023)	Winners (2022–23)	1	2
France	23 March 2025	1 (2021)	Winners (2020–21)	4	3
Portugal	23 March 2025	1 (2019*)	Winners (2018–19)	3	7
Germany (host)	23 March 2025	0 (debut)	Eighth place (2020–21)	2	10

== Host selection ==
Following the introduction of the quarter-finals, the four participants of the Nations League Finals would not be known until 23 March 2025, a little over two months prior to the tournament. As a result, UEFA revised the bidding process from previous tournament editions. All teams participating in League A whose stadiums met the stadium requirements had to submit a proposal to host the Nations League Finals. Following the league phase, the UEFA Executive Committee would designate one pair of quarter-finalists capable of holding the tournament, with the winner automatically becoming the host. Additionally, associations from outside League A could also submit a bid to hold the tournament as a neutral host, with their bids to be considered only if no pairing of quarter-finalists could offer sufficient guarantees or satisfy the hosting requirements.

UEFA required the tournament to be played at two Category 4 stadiums, each with at least 30,000 net seating capacity (though there may be some flexibility regarding the second stadium). Ideally, the stadiums should not be located more than 150 kilometres (93 mi), or a two-hour bus drive, apart. If hosted by a participating team, the larger of the stadiums should hold the first semi-final (featuring the host team) and the final. The bidding timeline was as follows:

- 18 January 2024: Applications formally invited
- 15 May 2024, 12:00 CEST: Closing date for registering intention to bid (non-binding) and preferred stadiums
- 4 September 2024: Bid requirements made available to bidders
- 23 October 2024: Submission of bid documents
- 16 December 2024: Host appointment by the UEFA Executive Committee

On 16 December 2024, the UEFA Executive Committee appointed the winner of quarter-final 4, between Italy and Germany, as the provisional hosts for the final tournament. On 23 March 2025, Germany became hosts of the tournament after winning their quarter-final tie.

== Venues ==
The matches were played at the Allianz Arena in Munich (Germany's semi-final and the final) and the MHPArena in Stuttgart (the other semi-final and the third place play-off).

Had Italy hosted the tournament, the matches would have been played at the Juventus Stadium (both semi-finals and final) and Stadio Olimpico Grande Torino (third place play-off), both in Turin.

Munich	Location of the host cities of the 2025 UEFA Nations League Finals.	Stuttgart
Allianz Arena	Location of the host cities of the 2025 UEFA Nations League Finals.	MHPArena
Capacity: 66,000	Location of the host cities of the 2025 UEFA Nations League Finals.	Capacity: 51,000

== Draw ==
The semi-final pairings were determined by means of an open draw on 22 November 2024, 12:00 CET, at the UEFA headquarters in Nyon, Switzerland, along with the draw for the League A quarter-finals and promotion/relegation play-offs. As the quarter-finals were not played until March 2025, placeholders were used to represent the winners of quarter-finals 1 to 4. The first two balls drawn were allocated as the administrative home teams for each semi-final pairing, with the next two balls drawn allocated as their opponents. For scheduling purposes, the host team was allocated to semi-final 1 as the administrative home team. The administrative home team for both the third place play-off and final were predetermined as the teams which advanced from semi-final 1.

== Squads ==
Each national team had to submit a squad of between 23 and 26 players, three of whom had to be goalkeepers, at least seven days before the opening match of the tournament. If a player became injured or ill severely enough to prevent his participation in the tournament before his team's first match, he could have been replaced by another player.

== Bracket ==
Semi-finals
4 June – Munich
Germany	1
Portugal	2
5 June – Stuttgart
Spain	5
France	4

Final
8 June – Munich
Portugal (p)	2 (5)
Spain	2 (3)
Third place play-off
8 June – Stuttgart
Germany	0
France	2

All times are local, CEST (UTC+2).

== Semi-finals ==
=== Germany vs Portugal ===
4 June 2025
21:10 (Note: The Germany v Portugal match, originally scheduled for 21:00, was delayed by ten minutes due to adverse weather conditions impacting the teams' warm-ups.)

Germany	1–2	Portugal
Wirtz 48'	Report	Conceição 63'; Ronaldo 68'

Allianz Arena, Munich
Attendance: 65,823
Referee: Slavko Vinčić (Slovenia)

Germany	Portugal

GK	1	Marc-André ter Stegen
CB	2	Waldemar Anton		(substituted off) 71'
CB	4	Jonathan Tah	(yellow card) 80'
CB	3	Robin Koch
RM	6	Joshua Kimmich (c)
CM	25	Aleksandar Pavlović		(substituted off) 71'
CM	8	Leon Goretzka
LM	18	Maximilian Mittelstädt		(substituted off) 60'
RF	19	Leroy Sané		(substituted off) 60'
CF	17	Florian Wirtz	(yellow card) 84'
LF	11	Nick Woltemade		(substituted off) 60'
Substitutions:
MF	21	Robin Gosens		(substituted on) 60'
MF	20	Serge Gnabry		(substituted on) 60'
FW	9	Niclas Füllkrug	(yellow card) 84'	(substituted on) 60'
FW	14	Karim Adeyemi		(substituted on) 71'
MF	7	Felix Nmecha		(substituted on) 71'
Manager:
Julian Nagelsmann

GK	1	Diogo Costa
RB	15	João Neves		(substituted off) 58'
CB	3	Rúben Dias	(yellow card) 84'
CB	14	Gonçalo Inácio
LB	25	Nuno Mendes
CM	18	Rúben Neves	(yellow card) 52'	(substituted off) 58'
CM	10	Bernardo Silva
RW	16	Francisco Trincão		(substituted off) 58'
AM	8	Bruno Fernandes
LW	20	Pedro Neto		(substituted off) 83'
CF	7	Cristiano Ronaldo (c)		(substituted off) 90'
Substitutions:
MF	23	Vitinha		(substituted on) 58'
FW	26	Francisco Conceição		(substituted on) 58'
DF	2	Nélson Semedo		(substituted on) 58'
FW	21	Diogo Jota		(substituted on) 83'
MF	6	João Palhinha		(substituted on) 90'
Manager:
(Spain) Roberto Martínez			(yellow card) 52'

Man of the Match:
Francisco Conceição (Portugal)

Assistant referees:
Tomaž Klančnik (Slovenia)
Andraž Kovačič (Slovenia)
Fourth official:
Matej Jug (Slovenia)
Video assistant referee:
Alen Borošak (Slovenia)
Assistant video assistant referee:
Rade Obrenovič (Slovenia)

=== Spain vs France ===
5 June 2025
21:00

Spain	5–4	France
Williams 22'; Merino 25'; Yamal 54' (pen.), 67'; Pedri 55'	Report	Mbappé 59' (pen.); Cherki 79'; Vivian 84' (o.g.); Kolo Muani 90+3'

MHPArena, Stuttgart
Attendance: 51,724
Referee: Michael Oliver (England)

Spain	France

GK	23	Unai Simón (c)
RB	2	Pedro Porro
CB	3	Robin Le Normand		(substituted off) 77'
CB	12	Dean Huijsen
LB	24	Marc Cucurella
CM	6	Mikel Merino		(substituted off) 90+1'
CM	18	Martín Zubimendi
CM	20	Pedri		(substituted off) 64'
RF	19	Lamine Yamal	(yellow card) 33'
CF	21	Mikel Oyarzabal		(substituted off) 77'
LF	11	Nico Williams		(substituted off) 64'
Substitutions:
FW	10	Dani Olmo		(substituted on) 64'
MF	8	Fabián Ruiz		(substituted on) 64'
FW	26	Samu Aghehowa		(substituted on) 77'
DF	5	Daniel Vivian		(substituted on) 77'
MF	9	Gavi	(yellow card) 90+6'	(substituted on) 90+1'
Manager:
Luis de la Fuente

GK	16	Mike Maignan
RB	19	Pierre Kalulu		(substituted off) 63'
CB	15	Ibrahima Konaté
CB	5	Clément Lenglet		(substituted off) 72'
LB	22	Théo Hernandez	(yellow card) 82'
CM	13	Manu Koné	(yellow card) 90+7'
CM	14	Adrien Rabiot	(yellow card) 51'
RW	7	Ousmane Dembélé		(substituted off) 76'
AM	11	Michael Olise		(substituted off) 63'
LW	24	Désiré Doué		(substituted off) 63'
CF	10	Kylian Mbappé (c)
Substitutions:
DF	17	Malo Gusto		(substituted on) 63'
FW	20	Bradley Barcola		(substituted on) 63'
FW	25	Rayan Cherki		(substituted on) 63'
DF	21	Lucas Hernandez		(substituted on) 72'
FW	12	Randal Kolo Muani	(yellow card) 90+4'	(substituted on) 76'
Manager:
Didier Deschamps

Man of the Match:
Lamine Yamal (Spain)

Assistant referees:
Stuart Burt (England)
James Mainwaring (England)
Fourth official:
Andrew Madley (England)
Video assistant referee:
Jarred Gillett (England)
Assistant video assistant referee:
Michael Salisbury (England)

== Third place play-off ==
8 June 2025
15:00

Germany	0–2	France
	Report	Mbappé 45'; Olise 84'

MHPArena, Stuttgart
Attendance: 51,313
Referee: Ivan Kružliak (Slovakia)

Germany	France

GK	1	Marc-André ter Stegen
RB	6	Joshua Kimmich (c)
CB	4	Jonathan Tah	(yellow card) 61'
CB	3	Robin Koch
LB	22	David Raum	(yellow card) 29'	(substituted off) 65'
CM	5	Pascal Groß		(substituted off) 73'
CM	8	Leon Goretzka		(substituted off) 65'
RW	11	Nick Woltemade		(substituted off) 46'
AM	17	Florian Wirtz
LW	14	Karim Adeyemi	(yellow card) 35'	(substituted off) 78'
CF	9	Niclas Füllkrug
Substitutions:
FW	13	Deniz Undav		(substituted on) 46'
MF	26	Tom Bischof		(substituted on) 65'
DF	18	Maximilian Mittelstädt		(substituted on) 65'
DF	15	Thilo Kehrer		(substituted on) 73'
MF	20	Serge Gnabry		(substituted on) 78'
Manager:
Julian Nagelsmann

GK	16	Mike Maignan
RB	17	Malo Gusto
CB	4	Loïc Badé
CB	21	Lucas Hernandez	(yellow card) 61'
LB	3	Lucas Digne	(yellow card) 12'
CM	8	Aurélien Tchouaméni		(substituted off) 68'
CM	14	Adrien Rabiot
RW	12	Randal Kolo Muani		(substituted off) 68'
AM	25	Rayan Cherki		(substituted off) 68'
LW	9	Marcus Thuram		(substituted off) 90'
CF	10	Kylian Mbappé (c)
Substitutions:
MF	11	Michael Olise		(substituted on) 68'
FW	24	Désiré Doué		(substituted on) 68'
MF	13	Manu Koné		(substituted on) 68'
MF	6	Mattéo Guendouzi		(substituted on) 90'
Manager:
Didier Deschamps

Man of the Match:
Kylian Mbappé (France)

Assistant referees:
Branislav Hancko (Slovakia)
Ján Pozor (Slovakia)
Fourth official:
Erik Lambrechts (Belgium)
Video assistant referee:
Michael Fabbri (Italy)
Assistant video assistant referee:
Luca Pairetto (Italy)

== Final ==
8 June 2025
21:00

Portugal	2–2 (a.e.t.)	Spain
Mendes 26'; Ronaldo 61'	Report	Zubimendi 21'; Oyarzabal 45'
Penalties
Ramos (penalty scored); Vitinha (penalty scored); Fernandes (penalty scored); Mendes (penalty scored); R. Neves (penalty scored)	5–3	(penalty scored) Merino; (penalty scored) Baena; (penalty scored) Isco; (penalty missed) Morata

Munich Football Arena , Munich
Attendance: 65,852
Referee: Sandro Schärer (Switzerland)

Portugal	Spain

GK	1	Diogo Costa
RB	15	João Neves		(substituted off) 46'
CB	3	Rúben Dias
CB	14	Gonçalo Inácio	(yellow card) 19'	(substituted off) 74'
LB	25	Nuno Mendes	(yellow card) 100'
CM	10	Bernardo Silva		(substituted off) 74'
CM	23	Vitinha
RW	20	Pedro Neto	(yellow card) 82'	(substituted off) 106'
AM	8	Bruno Fernandes
LW	26	Francisco Conceição		(substituted off) 46'
CF	7	Cristiano Ronaldo (c)		(substituted off) 88'
Substitutions:
DF	2	Nélson Semedo		(substituted on) 46'
MF	18	Rúben Neves		(substituted on) 46'
DF	13	Renato Veiga		(substituted on) 74'
FW	17	Rafael Leão		(substituted on) 74'
FW	9	Gonçalo Ramos		(substituted on) 88'
FW	21	Diogo Jota		(substituted on) 106'
Manager:
(Spain) Roberto Martínez			(yellow card) 110'

GK	23	Unai Simón (c)
RB	14	Óscar Mingueza		(substituted off) 92'
CB	3	Robin Le Normand	(yellow card) 90+1'
CB	12	Dean Huijsen
LB	24	Marc Cucurella
CM	20	Pedri		(substituted off) 75'
CM	18	Martín Zubimendi
CM	8	Fabián Ruiz	(yellow card) 33'	(substituted off) 75'
RF	19	Lamine Yamal		(substituted off) 106'
CF	21	Mikel Oyarzabal		(substituted off) 111'
LF	11	Nico Williams		(substituted off) 92'
Substitutions:
MF	22	Isco		(substituted on) 75'
MF	6	Mikel Merino		(substituted on) 75'
MF	16	Álex Baena	(yellow card) 100'	(substituted on) 92'
DF	2	Pedro Porro	(yellow card) 110'	(substituted on) 92'
FW	15	Yéremy Pino		(substituted on) 106'
FW	7	Álvaro Morata		(substituted on) 111'
Manager:
Luis de la Fuente

Man of the Match:
Nuno Mendes (Portugal)

Assistant referees:
Jonas Erni (Switzerland)
Susann Küng (Switzerland) (Note: Stéphane de Almeida (Switzerland) was originally appointed as an assistant referee for the match, but was removed due to his Portuguese ancestry and replaced by Susann Küng.)
Fourth official:
Serdar Gözübüyük (Netherlands)
Video assistant referee:
Fedayi San (Switzerland)
Assistant video assistant referees:
Dennis Higler (Netherlands)
Pol van Boekel (Netherlands)

== Statistics ==
=== Goalscorers ===
There were 18 goals scored in 4 matches, for an average of 4.5 goals per match.

2 goals

- (France national football team) Kylian Mbappé
- (Portugal national football team) Cristiano Ronaldo
- (Spain national football team) Lamine Yamal

1 goal

- (France national football team) Rayan Cherki
- (France national football team) Randal Kolo Muani
- (France national football team) Michael Olise
- (Germany national football team) Florian Wirtz
- (Portugal national football team) Francisco Conceição
- (Portugal national football team) Nuno Mendes
- (Spain national football team) Mikel Merino
- (Spain national football team) Mikel Oyarzabal
- (Spain national football team) Pedri
- (Spain national football team) Nico Williams
- (Spain national football team) Martín Zubimendi

1 own goal

- (Spain national football team) Daniel Vivian (against France)

=== Awards ===
Player of the Tournament

The Player of the Finals award was given to Nuno Mendes, who was chosen by UEFA's technical observers.

- (Portugal) Nuno Mendes

Goal of the Tournament

The Goal of the Finals was decided by online voting. A total of four goals were in the shortlist, chosen by UEFA's technical observers: Rayan Cherki (against Spain), Francisco Conceição (against Germany), Nuno Mendes (against Spain) and Mikel Merino (against France). Cherki won the award for his goal in the semi-final.

Rank	Goalscorer	Opponent	Score	Result	Round
1st place, gold medalist(s)	(France) Rayan Cherki	Spain	2–5	4–5	Semi-finals
—	(Portugal) Francisco Conceição	Germany	1–1	2–1	Semi-finals
—	(Portugal) Nuno Mendes	Spain	1–1	2–2 (a.e.t.) (5–3 p)	Final
—	(Spain) Mikel Merino	France	2–0	5–4	Semi-finals

=== Discipline ===
A player or coach would have been automatically suspended for the next match for receiving a red card, which could have been extended for serious offences. Yellow card suspensions did not apply in the Nations League Finals, including any pending suspensions from the league phase and quarter-finals, while yellow cards issued were not carried forward to any other future international matches.
