= Maxence Caqueret =

French footballer (born 2000)

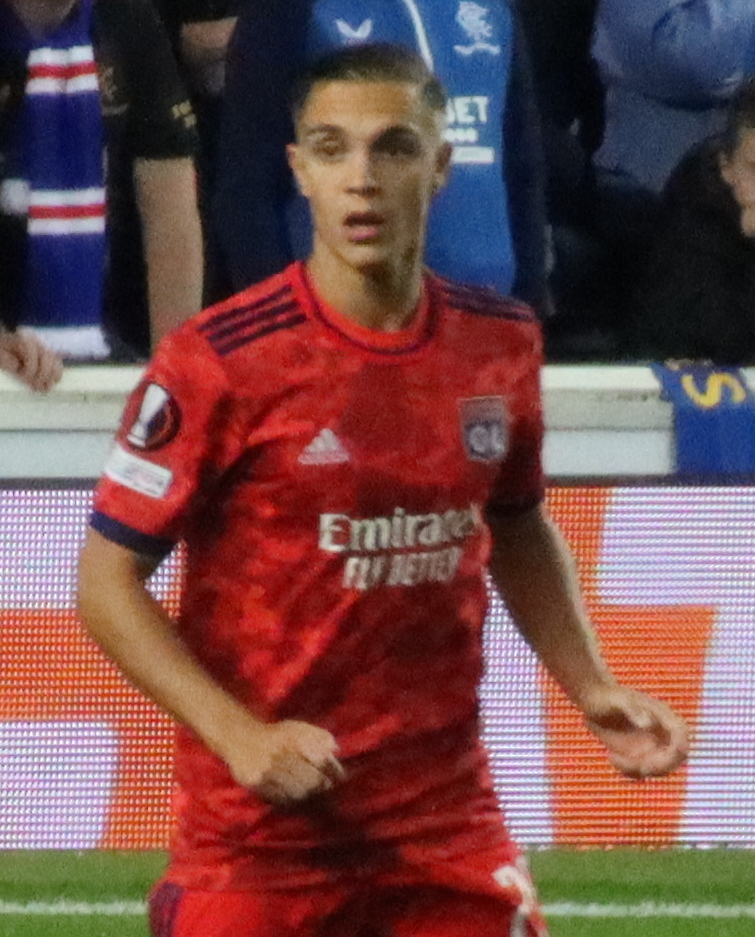
- Caqueret playing for Lyon in 2021

Personal information
- Full name: Maxence Caqueret
- Date of birth: 15 February 2000 (age 26)
- Place of birth: Vénissieux, France
- Height: 1.74 m (5 ft 9 in)
- Position: Defensive midfielder

Team information
- Current team: Como
- Number: 8

Youth career
- 2006–2007: FC de Corbas
- 2007–2011: FC Chaponnay Marennes
- 2011–2019: Lyon

Senior career*
Years	Team	Apps	(Gls)
2016–2019	Lyon B	40	(3)
2019–2025	Lyon	147	(5)
2025–	Como	58	(4)

International career^{‡}
2015–2016	France U16	12	(3)
2016–2017	France U17	15	(7)
2017–2018	France U18	12	(1)
2018–2019	France U19	16	(1)
2019	France U20	3	(0)
2020–2023	France U21	24	(4)
- * Club domestic league appearances and goals as of 18:48, 8 November 2026 (UTC) ‡ National team caps and goals as of 2 July 2023

Maxence Caqueret (born 15 February 2000) is a French professional footballer who plays as a defensive midfielder for Serie A club Como.

== Club career ==
=== Lyon ===
Caqueret is a product of the Lyon academy. He made his first team debut on 5 January 2019 in a 2–0 away win against Bourges 18 in the Coupe de France. He started the match before being replaced by Houssem Aouar after 72 minutes. On 30 November, Caqueret played his first Ligue 1 game against Strasbourg giving an assist to Maxwel Cornet in a 2–1 win. On 4 January, Caqueret scored his first professional goal in Coupe de France against Bourg-en-Bresse. Caqueret left the club in January 2025 having played 187 games.

=== Como ===
On 12 January 2025, Caqueret signed a four-and-a-half-year contract with Serie A side Como. The transfer fee was reported as €17 million including bonuses.

== Career statistics ==
As of match played 8 November 2026

Appearances and goals by club, season and competition
Club	Season	League			National cup (Note: Includes Coupe de France, Coppa Italia)		Europe		Other		Total	
Club	Season	Division	Apps	Goals	Apps	Goals	Apps	Goals	Apps	Goals	Apps	Goals
Lyon B	2016–17	CFA	1	0	—		—		—		1	0
Lyon B	2017–18	National 2	16	0	—		—		—		16	0
Lyon B	2018–19	National 2	19	3	—		—		—		19	3
Lyon B	2019–20	National 2	4	0	—		—		—		4	0
Lyon B	Total		40	3	—		—		—		40	3
Lyon	2018–19	Ligue 1	0	0	2	0	0	0	0	0	2	0
Lyon	2019–20	Ligue 1	8	0	2	1	3 (Note: Appearances in UEFA Champions League)	0	3 (Note: Appearances in Coupe de la Ligue)	0	16	1
Lyon	2020–21	Ligue 1	29	0	4	0	—		—		33	0
Lyon	2021–22	Ligue 1	31	0	0	0	8 (Note: Appearances in UEFA Europa League)	0	—		39	0
Lyon	2022–23	Ligue 1	36	4	4	0	—		—		40	4
Lyon	2023–24	Ligue 1	34	1	6	1	—		—		40	2
Lyon	2024–25	Ligue 1	9	0	1	0	4	0	—		14	0
Lyon	Total		147	5	19	2	15	0	3	0	184	6
Como	2024–25	Serie A	18	2	—		—		—		18	2
Como	2025–26	Serie A	30	2	6	0	—		—		36	2
Como	2026–27	Serie A	10	0	0	0	2	0	—		12	0
Como	Total		58	4	6	0	2	0	—		66	4
Career total			245	12	25	2	17	0	3	0	290	13

== Honours ==
Lyon

- Coupe de France runner-up: 2023–24
- Coupe de la Ligue runner-up: 2019–20

Individual

- UEFA European Under-19 Championship Team of the Tournament: 2019
