= Sinaly Diomandé =

Ivorian footballer

Personal information
- Date of birth: 9 April 2001 (age 25)
- Place of birth: Djékanou, Ivory Coast
- Height: 1.84 m (6 ft 0 in)
- Positions: Center-back; right-back

Team information
- Current team: Auxerre
- Number: 20

Youth career
- Académie JMG
- –2019: Guidars FC

Senior career*
Years	Team	Apps	(Gls)
2019–2020	Lyon II	18	(0)
2020–2024	Lyon	72	(0)
2024–	Auxerre	47	(4)

International career^{‡}
2020–	Ivory Coast	10	(0)
- * Club domestic league appearances and goals as of 20 May 2026 ‡ National team caps and goals as of 16 November 2022

Sinaly Diomandé (born 9 April 2001) is an Ivorian professional footballer who plays as a center-back or right-back for Ligue 1 side Auxerre and the Ivory Coast national team.

== Club career ==
Diomandé came out of the Jean-Marc Guillou academy in Abidjan, before joining the Guidars FC, in Mali. He moved to Olympique Lyonnais in September 2019 for a fee of €550,000, with bonuses rising up to €2 million.

After a year of playing in Lyon's reserve team, where he became one of the players most used by Gueïda Fofana, and an impressive summer preparation, Diomande made his professional debut for Olympique Lyonnais on 18 September 2020, helping his team keep a clean sheet against Nîmes in this Ligue 1 encounter.

On 30 August 2024, Diomandé was transferred to Auxerre, signing a three-year contract.

== International career ==
Diomandé debuted with the Ivory Coast national team in a 1–1 friendly draw with Belgium on 8 October 2020.

== Career statistics ==
=== Club ===
As of match played 10 January 2025.

Appearances and goals by club, season and competition
Club	Season	League			National cup		League cup		Europe		Other		Total	
Club	Season	Division	Apps	Goals	Apps	Goals	Apps	Goals	Apps	Goals	Apps	Goals	Apps	Goals
Lyon II	2019–20	CFA 2	16	0	—		—		—		—		16	0
Lyon II	2021–22	CFA 2	1	0	—		—		—		—		1	0
Lyon II	2022–23	CFA 2	1	0	—		—		—		—		1	0
Lyon II	Total		18	0	—		—		—		—		18	0
Lyon	2019–20	Ligue 1	0	0	0	0	0	0	0 (Note: Appearance(s) in UEFA Champions League)	0	—		0	0
Lyon	2020–21	Ligue 1	27	0	4	0	—		—		—		31	0
Lyon	2021–22	Ligue 1	11	0	0	0	—		4 (Note: Appearance(s) in UEFA Europa League)	0	—		15	0
Lyon	2022–23	Ligue 1	24	0	5	0	—		—		—		29	0
Lyon	2023–24	Ligue 1	10	0	0	0	—		—		—		10	0
Lyon	Total		72	0	9	0	0	0	4	0	—		85	0
Auxerre	2024–25	Ligue 1	11	2	1	0	—		—		—		12	2
Career total			101	2	10	0	0	0	4	0	0	0	115	2

=== International ===
As of match played 16 November 2022

Appearances and goals by national team and year
National team	Year	Apps	Goals
Ivory Coast	2020	3	0
Ivory Coast	2021	5	0
Ivory Coast	2022	2	0
Total		10	0
