= Kayne Bonnevie =

French footballer (born 2001)

Kayne Bonnvie
Personal information
- Date of birth: 22 July 2001 (age 25)
- Place of birth: Écully, France
- Height: 1.91 m (6 ft 3 in)
- Position: Goalkeeper

Team information
- Current team: Limonest
- Number: 30

Youth career
- –2016: Le Geldar
- 2016–2020: Lyon

Senior career*
Years	Team	Apps	(Gls)
2020–2023	Lyon B	25	(0)
2022–2023	Lyon	0	(0)
2023–2026	Quevilly-Rouen	36	(0)
2023	Quevilly-Rouen B	5	(0)
2026–	Limonest	4	(0)

International career^{‡}
2026–	French Guiana	2	(0)
- * Club domestic league appearances and goals as of 19 September 2026 ‡ National team caps and goals as of 30 September 2026

Kayne Bonnevie (born 22 July 2001) is a professional footballer who plays as a goalkeeper for Championnat National 1 club Limonest. Born in metropolitan France, he represents the French Guiana national team.

== Career ==
Born in Écully in the Metropolitan France, Bonnevie moved to Kourou, French Guiana with his family during childhood. He started his football career in local club Le Geldar. In 2016, he joined the Lyon youth academy.

On 22 April 2021, Bonnevie signed his first professional contract with Lyon.

In July 2023, he joined Quevilly-Rouen, signing a three-year contract. On 4 November 2023, he made his professional debut against Rodez in a 3–1 Ligue 2 win.
