= Rayan Cherki =

French footballer (born 2003)

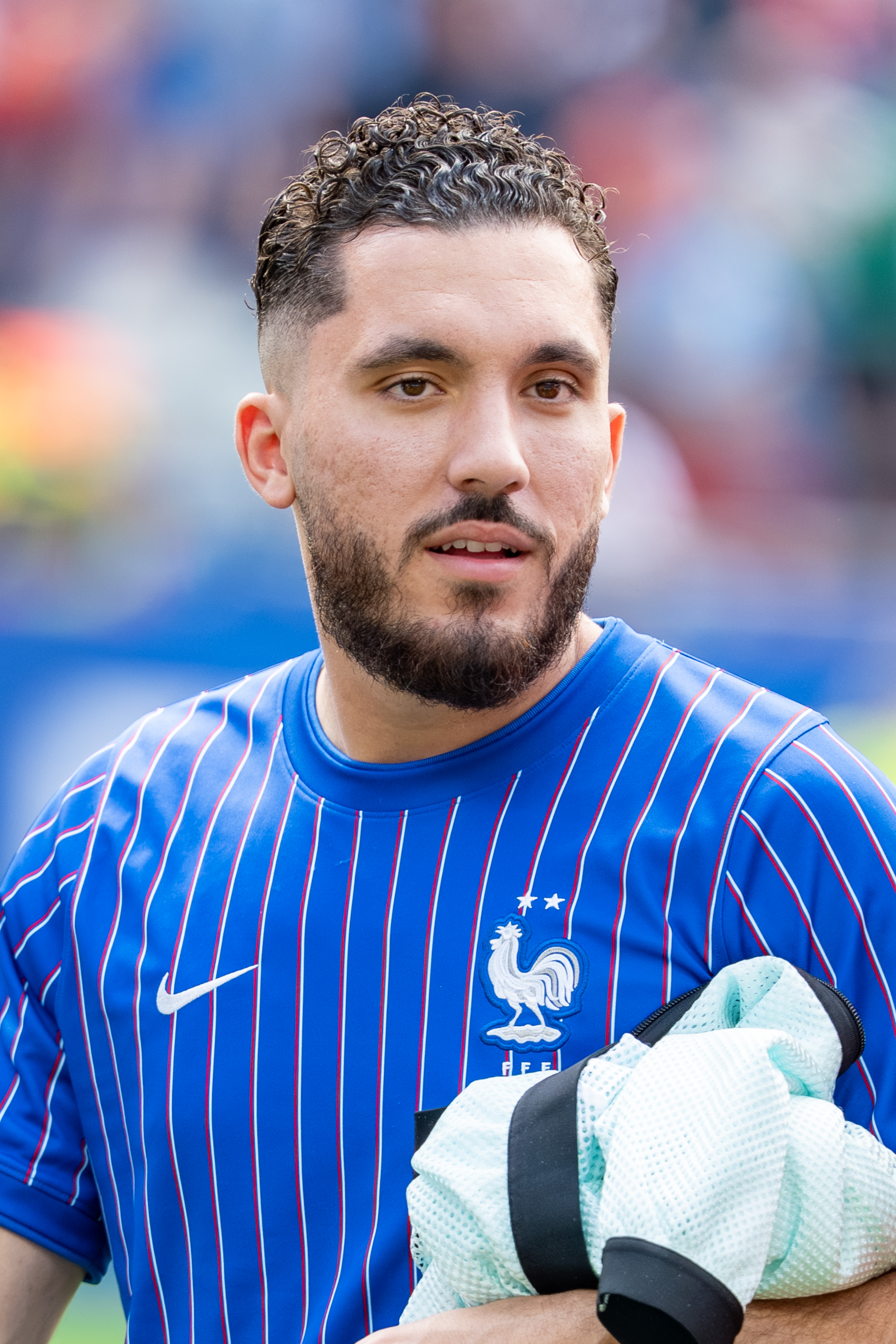
- Cherki with France in 2026

Personal information
- Full name: Mathis Rayan Cherki
- Date of birth: 17 August 2003 (age 23)
- Place of birth: Lyon, France
- Height: 1.80 m (5 ft 11 in)
- Positions: Attacking midfielder; winger

Team information
- Current team: Manchester City
- Number: 10

Youth career
- 2009–2010: Saint-Priest
- 2010–2019: Lyon

Senior career*
Years	Team	Apps	(Gls)
2019–2021	Lyon B	13	(5)
2019–2025	Lyon	146	(14)
2025–	Manchester City	42	(9)

International career^{‡}
2018	France U16	2	(0)
2021	France U19	3	(2)
2021–2025	France U21	23	(13)
2024	France Olympic	8	(2)
2025–	France	20	(3)
Medal record
Men's football
Representing France
UEFA Nations League
Third place	2025 Germany	Team
Olympic Games
Silver medal – second place	2024 Paris	Team
- * Club domestic league appearances and goals as of 5:00, 7 November 2026 (UTC) ‡ National team caps and goals as of 22:22, 15 November 2026 (UTC)

Mathis Rayan Cherki (French pronunciation: [ʁajan ʃɛʁki]; born 17 August 2003) is a French professional footballer who plays as an attacking midfielder or winger for Premier League club Manchester City and the France national team. He is currently regarded as one of the best attacking midfielders in the world.

== Early life ==
Mathis Rayan Cherki was born on 17 August 2003 in Lyon, France and is of Algerian and Italian descent. His father, Fabrice Amsellem, has Algerian-Jewish and Italian roots traced back to Bari, and his mother, Abla Cherki, is of Algerian descent, with her roots traced back to Biskra.

== Club career ==
=== Lyon ===
Cherki is a product of the youth academy of Lyon, and is considered one of their best-ever prospects. He began playing with their reserve side in the Championnat National 2 at the age of 15. On 7 July 2019, Cherki signed his first professional contract with Lyon until 2022. He made his professional debut in a 0–0 Ligue 1 draw against Dijon on 19 October 2019. After scoring four goals in the 2019–20 UEFA Youth League, he made his senior European debut on 27 November 2019 in a Champions League group stage game against Zenit Saint Petersburg, aged 16 years and 102 days, in which he substituted Maxwel Cornet in the 74th minute of a 2–0 loss.

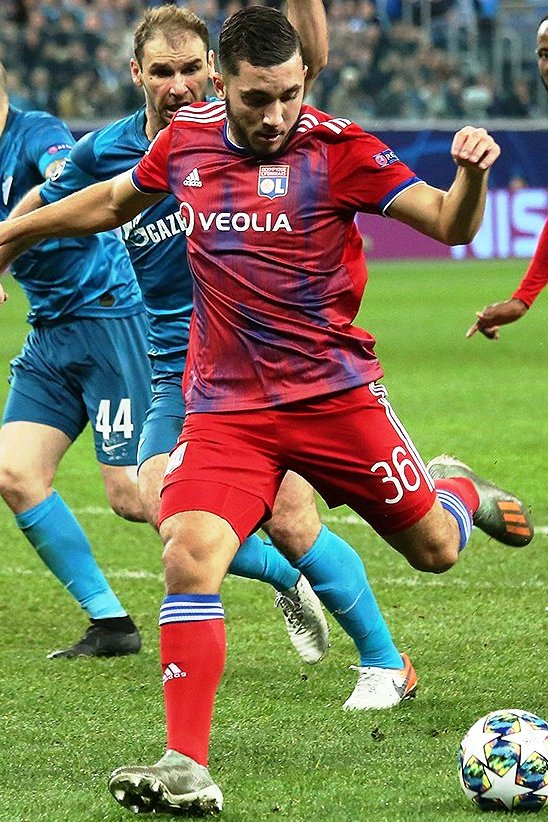
Cherki on his UEFA Champions League debut game against Zenit Saint Petersburg in 2019

On 4 January 2020, Cherki scored his first senior goal as a substitute in a 7–0 win over Bourg-en-Bresse in the Coupe de France, becoming the youngest-ever player to score a senior goal for Lyon, aged 16 years and 140 days. On 18 January, he was involved in all four of Lyon's goals in a 4–3 win over Nantes in another Coupe de France match; he scored a brace, and assisted the other two goals. On 19 August, Cherki was subbed on in a UEFA Champions League match against Bayern Munich. In doing so, he became the youngest-ever player to feature in a Champions League semi-final. Lyon were knocked out of the competition in that match, losing 3–0 to the eventual winners.

Cherki scored his first Ligue 1 goal in a 3–2 win over Monaco on 2 May 2021. His goal secured the victory for Lyon in the final minutes of the match.

In September 2024, Cherki extended his stay with the club until 2027. The extension included an optional year, which would be automatically activated if he was still under contract with Lyon on 1 September 2025. Following the contract extension, Cherki emerged as a standout player for Lyon, finishing as the league’s top assist provider with 11, and earning him a place in the UNFP Team of the Year. He was also given the inaugural Ligue 1 Dribbler of the Year award. In the UEFA Europa League, Cherki delivered eight assists, making him the competition’s top assist provider and playing a key role in helping Lyon reach the quarter-finals. His performances were further recognized with the competition's Young Player of the Season award and a place in the Team of the Season.

=== Manchester City ===
On 10 June 2025, Premier League club Manchester City announced the signing of Cherki on a five-year contract for a reported initial fee of €36.5m, a potential €6m in add-ons, and a 15% sell-on clause. On 22 June, he scored his first goal for the club in a 6–0 FIFA Club World Cup group stage victory against Al Ain. On 14 August, after Jack Grealish's departure on loan to Everton, Cherki was given the number 10 shirt. On 16 August, Cherki scored on his Premier League debut for City after coming on as a substitute for Erling Haaland in a 4–0 away victory over Wolverhampton Wanderers in their season opener. On 29 October, Cherki registered a goal and an assist on his EFL Cup debut in a 3–1 away victory over EFL Championship side Swansea City in the fourth round. On 5 November, Cherki scored his first Champions League goal in a 4–1 home league phase victory over Bundesliga side Borussia Dortmund.

On 28 August 2026, Cherki scored twice in a 4–1 away win against Crystal Palace.

On 20 September 2026, Cherki scored in a 5-3 win at home against Sunderland.

== International career ==
=== Youth ===
Cherki was eligible to play for either France, Algeria, or Italy – the latter two due to his parents' origin. He played for the France national under-16 team twice in 2018, both of which were friendly matches against Denmark.

In 2024, Cherki was named in France U23's squad for the Olympic Games hosted in France. He appeared in three games during the tournament, starting in the last group stage game against New Zealand, and then appeared as a substitute in the semi-final game against Egypt, and then in the final against Spain, as France won the silver medal. Being an Olympic medalist, Cherki was awarded the Knight of the National Order of Merit.

=== Senior ===
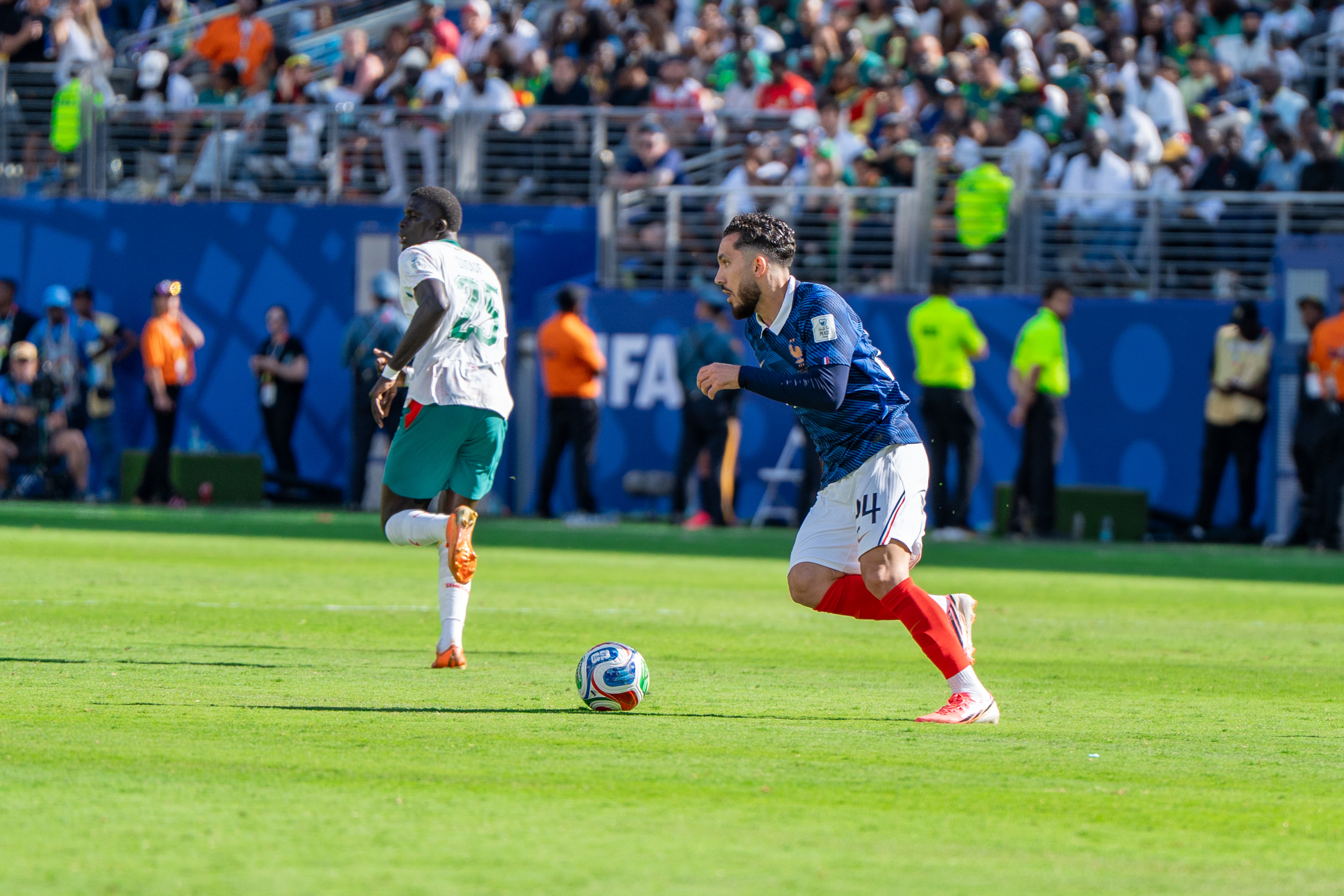
Cherki playing for France at the 2026 FIFA World Cup

Cherki debuted for the French senior squad on 5 June 2025, scoring and assisting in a 5–4 loss against Spain in the Nations League semi-finals. Three days later, on 9 June, he earned his first start in a 2–0 victory against Germany in the same tournament.

On 14 May 2026, Cherki was selected in the 26-man squad for the 2026 FIFA World Cup.

== Personal life ==
Cherki is a Muslim.

== Career statistics ==
=== Club ===
As of match played 7 November 2026

Appearances and goals by club, season and competition
Club	Season	League			National cup (Note: Includes Coupe de France, FA Cup)		League cup (Note: Includes Coupe de la Ligue, EFL Cup)		Europe		Other		Total	
Club	Season	Division	Apps	Goals	Apps	Goals	Apps	Goals	Apps	Goals	Apps	Goals	Apps	Goals
Lyon B	2019–20	National 2	10	5	—		—		—		—		10	5
Lyon B	2020–21	National 2	1	0	—		—		—		—		1	0
Lyon B	2021–22	National 2	2	0	—		—		—		—		2	0
Lyon B	Total		13	5	—		—		—		—		13	5
Lyon	2019–20	Ligue 1	6	0	3	3	2	0	2 (Note: Appearances in UEFA Champions League)	0	—		13	3
Lyon	2020–21	Ligue 1	27	1	3	3	—		—		—		30	4
Lyon	2021–22	Ligue 1	16	0	0	0	—		4 (Note: Appearances in UEFA Europa League)	2	—		20	2
Lyon	2022–23	Ligue 1	34	4	5	1	—		—		—		39	5
Lyon	2023–24	Ligue 1	33	1	6	2	—		—		—		39	3
Lyon	2024–25	Ligue 1	30	8	2	0	—		12	4	—		44	12
Lyon	Total		146	14	19	9	2	0	18	6	—		185	29
Manchester City	2024–25	Premier League	—		—		—		—		4 (Note: Appearances in FIFA Club World Cup)	1	4	1
Manchester City	2025–26	Premier League	33	4	6	0	5	3	8	3	—		52	10
Manchester City	2026–27	Premier League	9	5	0	0	2	1	4	1	1 (Note: Appearance in FA Community Shield)	0	16	7
Manchester City	Total		42	9	6	0	7	4	12	4	5	1	72	18
Career total			201	28	25	9	9	4	30	10	5	1	270	52

=== International ===
As of match played 15 November 2026

Appearances and goals by national team and year
National team	Year	Apps	Goals
France	2025	4	1
France	2026	16	2
Total		20	3

As of match played 5 October 2026
France score listed first, score column indicates score after each Cherki goal

List of international goals scored by Rayan Cherki
No.	Date	Venue	Cap	Opponent	Score	Result	Competition	Ref.
1	5 June 2025	MHPArena, Stuttgart, Germany	1	Spain	2–5	4–5	2025 UEFA Nations League Finals	
2	4 June 2026	Stade de la Beaujoire, Nantes, France	6	Ivory Coast	1–0	1–2	Friendly	
3	5 October 2026	Stade de France, Saint-Denis, France	18	Belgium	2–1	4–1	2026–27 UEFA Nations League A	

== Honours ==
Lyon

- Coupe de France runner-up: 2023–24
- Coupe de la Ligue runner-up: 2019–20

Manchester City

- FA Cup: 2025–26
- EFL Cup: 2025–26

France Olympic

- Summer Olympics silver medal: 2024

France

- UEFA Nations League third place: 2024–25

Individual

- UNFP Ligue 1 Team of the Year: 2024–25
- Ligue 1 top assist provider: 2024–25
- Ligue 1 Dribbler of the Year: 2024–25
- UEFA Europa League Team of the Season: 2024–25
- UEFA Europa League top assist provider: 2024–25
- UEFA Europa League Young Player of the Season: 2024–25
- UEFA Nations League Finals Goal of the Tournament: 2025
- PFA Team of the Year: 2025–26 Premier League

Orders

- Knight of the National Order of Merit: 2024
