= Florent Sanchez =

French footballer (born 2003)

Flo Sanchez
Personal information
- Date of birth: 2 April 2003 (age 23)
- Place of birth: Vaulx-en-Velin, France
- Height: 1.78 m (5 ft 10 in)
- Position: Midfielder

Team information
- Current team: Guingamp

Youth career
- 2009–2010: US Meyzieu
- 2010–2020: Lyon

Senior career*
Years	Team	Apps	(Gls)
2019–2024	Lyon B	33	(3)
2021–2024	Lyon	1	(0)
2022	→ Villefranche (loan)	15	(0)
2023	→ Volendam (loan)	13	(1)
2023–2024	→ RWD Molenbeek (loan)	13	(2)
2024–2026	Orléans	40	(4)
2026–	Guingamp	0	(0)

International career
2019	France U16	3	(2)
2022	France U19	6	(1)
2022–2023	France U20	10	(0)
- * Club domestic league appearances and goals as of 23 June 2026

Florent Sanchez Da Silva (born 2 April 2003) is a French professional footballer who plays as a midfielder for Ligue 2 club Guingamp.

== Club career ==
Sanchez arrived in the Lyon academy in 2010 from US Meyzieu, signing his first professional contract with Lyon on 2 December 2020. After figuring several times on the team sheet in January 2021, Sanchez Da Silva made his professional debut for Lyon on 6 February 2021 in a 3–0 win over Strasbourg.

On 31 January 2022, Sanchez joined Villefranche on loan until the end of the season.

On 2 January 2023, Sanchez joined Eredivisie side Volendam on a 6-month loan, scoring once as Volendam stayed up in 14th place in the 2022–23 Eredivisie.

On 30 July 2023, Sanchez moved on a new loan to RWD Molenbeek in Belgium.

On 29 November 2024, after releasing his contract with Lyon, Sanchez joined Championnat National club Orléans as a free agent.

On 9 July 2026, Sanchez signed a four-year contract with Guingamp in Ligue 2.

== International career ==
Born in France, Sanchez is of Brazilian and Spanish descent. He is a youth international for France.

== Career statistics ==
=== Club ===
As of end of 2024–25 season

Appearances and goals by club, season and competition
Club	Season	League			National cup (Note: Including Belgian Cup)		Europe		Other		Total	
Club	Season	Division	Apps	Goals	Apps	Goals	Apps	Goals	Apps	Goals	Apps	Goals
Lyon B	2019–20	National 2	3	0	0	0	—		—		3	0
Lyon B	2020–21	National 2	8	0	0	0	—		—		8	0
Lyon B	2021–22	National 2	13	2	0	0	—		—		13	2
Lyon B	2022–23	National 2	6	0	0	0	—		—		6	0
Lyon B	2024–25	National 3	3	1	0	0	—		—		3	1
Lyon B	Total		33	3	0	0	—		—		33	3
Lyon	2020–21	Ligue 1	1	0	0	0	—		—		1	0
Villefranche (loan)	2021–22	Championnat National	14	0	0	0	—		1 (Note: Appearance(s) in Promotion play-offs)	0	15	0
Volendam (loan)	2022–23	Eredivisie	13	1	0	0	—		—		13	1
RWDM Molenbeek (loan)	2023–24	Belgian Pro League	13	2	2	0	—		0	0	15	2
Orléans	2024–25	Championnat National	14	1	0	0	—		—		14	1
Career total			88	7	2	0	—		1	0	91	7
