= Yaya Soumaré =

French footballer (born 2000)

Yahya Soumaré
Personal information
- Date of birth: 23 June 2000 (age 26)
- Place of birth: Vénissieux, France
- Height: 1.73 m (5 ft 8 in)
- Position: Forward

Team information
- Current team: Bourges
- Number: 9

Youth career
- 2009–2015: Vénissieux
- 2015–2019: Lyon

Senior career*
Years	Team	Apps	(Gls)
2018–2021	Lyon II	34	(4)
2020–2023	Lyon	3	(0)
2021	→ Dijon (loan)	5	(0)
2021	→ Dijon B (loan)	2	(0)
2021–2022	→ Annecy (loan)	11	(0)
2022–2023	→ Bourg-en-Bresse (loan)	28	(2)
2023–2024	Orléans	21	(0)
2024	Orléans B	4	(2)
2024–	Bourges	5	(1)

International career^{‡}
2018	France U18	1	(1)
2018–2019	France U19	4	(1)
- * Club domestic league appearances and goals as of 2 November 2024 ‡ National team caps and goals as of 23 December 2020

Yahya Soumaré (born 23 June 2000) is a French professional footballer who plays as a forward for Championnat National 1 club Bourges.

== Early life ==
Born in Vénissieux, a town in the Lyon Metropolis, Soumaré first played with ASM Vénissieux before joining Lyon in 2015, signing his first professional contract there in 2020.

== Club career ==
Soumaré made his professional debut for Lyon on 23 December 2020, coming on as a late substitute for Tino Kadewere in a 3–0 Ligue 1 home win over Nantes.

On 16 June 2021, Soumaré joined Ligue 2 side Dijon on loan for the 2021–22 season.

On 4 December 2021, he was loaned to Championnat National club Annecy.

On 4 August 2022, Soumaré moved on loan to Bourg-en-Bresse.

== International career ==
Born in France, Soumaré is of Malian descent. He is a youth international for France.
