= PAOK FC in European football =

Greek club in European football

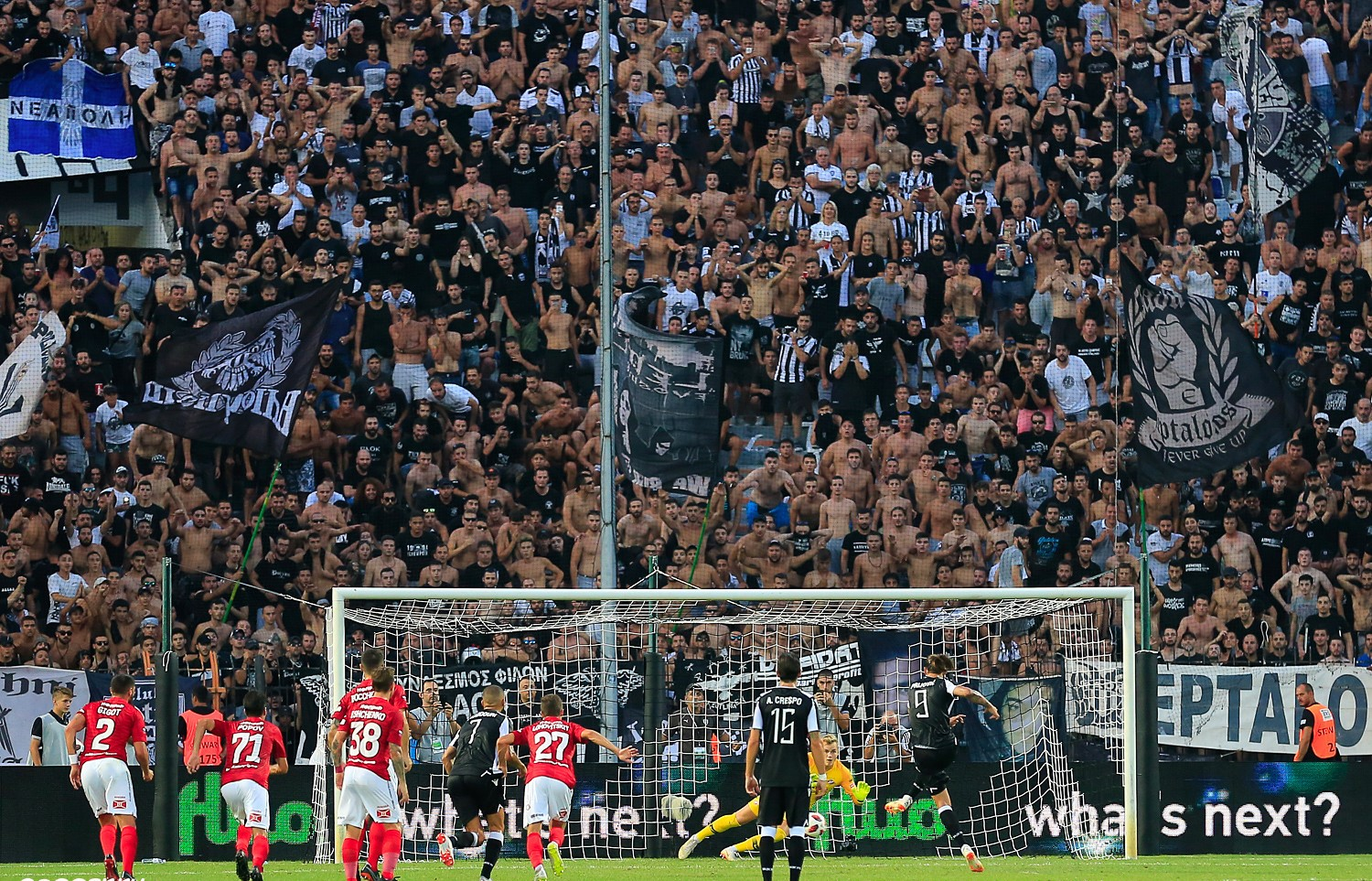
- August 2018, PAOK 3–2 Spartak Moscow
- Club: PAOK
- First entry: 1965–66 Inter-Cities Fairs Cup
- Latest entry: 2026–27 UEFA Europa League

PAOK FC history and statistics in UEFA competitions.

== Match table ==
=== European Cup / UEFA Champions League ===
Season	Competition	Round	Date	Venue	Opponent	Score	Attend.	Referee	Qual.
1976–77	European Cup	1st Round	15–09–1976	Old GSP Stadium	(Cyprus) Omonia – (Greece) PAOK	0–2	9,400	(Bulgaria) Stanev	
1976–77	European Cup	1st Round	29–09–1976	Toumba Stadium	(Greece) PAOK – (Cyprus) Omonia	1–1	11,045	(Czechoslovakia) Jursa	
1976–77	European Cup	2nd Round	20–10–1976	NSC Olimpiyskiy	Dynamo Kyiv – (Greece) PAOK	4–0	30.000	(Netherlands) Corver	
1976–77	European Cup	2nd Round	03–11–1976	Toumba Stadium	(Greece) PAOK – Dynamo Kyiv	0–2	27,350	(Italy) Gussoni	
1985–86	European Cup	1st Round	18–09–1985	Stadio Bentegodi	(Italy) Hellas Verona – (Greece) PAOK	3–1	27,008	(Austria) Brummeier	
1985–86	European Cup	1st Round	02–10–1985	Toumba Stadium	(Greece) PAOK – (Italy) Hellas Verona	1–2	40.000	(Spain) Castillo	
2004–05	Champions League	3rd Qual. Round	10–08–2004	Toumba Stadium	(Greece) PAOK – (Israel) Maccabi Tel Aviv	0–3 (w/o) ^{1}	20,655	(Spain) Ibáñez	
2004–05	Champions League	3rd Qual. Round	25–08–2004	Bloomfield Stadium	(Israel) Maccabi Tel Aviv – (Greece) PAOK	1–0	9.500	(Slovenia) Micheľ	
2010–11	Champions League	3rd Qual. Round	28–07–2010	Amsterdam Arena	(Netherlands) Ajax – (Greece) PAOK	1–1	24,151	(France) Chapron	
2010–11	Champions League	3rd Qual. Round	04–08–2010	Toumba Stadium	(Greece) PAOK – (Netherlands) Ajax	3–3	24,109	(Spain) Carballo	
2013–14	Champions League	3rd Qual. Round	30–07–2013	Toumba Stadium	(Greece) PAOK – (Ukraine) Metalist Kharkiv	0–2	Cl. doors	(Netherlands) van Boekel	^{2}
2013–14	Champions League	3rd Qual. Round	07–08–2013	Metalist Stadium	(Ukraine) Metalist Kharkiv – (Greece) PAOK	1–1	39,286	(Germany) Meyer	^{2}
2013–14	Champions League	Play-off Round	21–08–2013	Veltins Arena	(Germany) Schalke 04 – (Greece) PAOK	1–1	52,444	(France) Lannoy	
2013–14	Champions League	Play-off Round	27–08–2013	Toumba Stadium	(Greece) PAOK – (Germany) Schalke 04	2–3	Cl. doors	(Netherlands) Kuipers	
2016–17	Champions League	3rd Qual. Round	26–07–2016	Amsterdam Arena	(Netherlands) Ajax – (Greece) PAOK	1–1	47,744	(Spain) Estrada	
2016–17	Champions League	3rd Qual. Round	03–08–2016	Toumba Stadium	(Greece) PAOK – (Netherlands) Ajax	1–2	24,930	(England) Taylor	
2018–19	Champions League	2nd Qual. Round	24–07–2018	Toumba Stadium	(Greece) PAOK – (Switzerland) Basel	2–1	24,670	(England) Madley	
2018–19	Champions League	2nd Qual. Round	01–08–2018	St. Jakob-Park	(Switzerland) Basel – (Greece) PAOK	0–3	14,328	(Italy) Valeri	
2018–19	Champions League	3rd Qual. Round	08–08–2018	Toumba Stadium	(Greece) PAOK – (Russia) Spartak Moscow	3–2	24,463	(Israel) Grinfeld	
2018–19	Champions League	3rd Qual. Round	14–08–2018	Otkritie Arena	(Russia) Spartak Moscow – (Greece) PAOK	0–0	40,385	(France) Buquet	
2018–19	Champions League	Play-off round	21–08–2018	Estádio da Luz	(Portugal) Benfica – (Greece) PAOK	1–1	44,084	(Serbia) Mažić	
2018–19	Champions League	Play-off round	29–08–2018	Toumba Stadium	(Greece) PAOK – (Portugal) Benfica	1–4	27,725	(Germany) Brych	
2019–20	Champions League	3rd Qual. Round	06–08–2019	Toumba Stadium	(Greece) PAOK – (Netherlands) Ajax	2–2	23,418	(Slovenia) Vinčić	
2019–20	Champions League	3rd Qual. Round	13–08–2019	Johan Cruyff Arena	(Netherlands) Ajax – (Greece) PAOK	3–2	53,942	(England) Pawson	
2020–21	Champions League	2nd Qual. Round	25–08–2020	Toumba Stadium	(Greece) PAOK – (Turkey) Beşiktaş	3−1	Cl. doors	(Italy) Doveri	
2020–21	Champions League	3rd Qual. Round	15–09–2020	Toumba Stadium	(Greece) PAOK – (Portugal) Benfica	2−1	Cl. doors	(Germany) Brych	
2020–21	Champions League	Play-off round	22–09–2020	Krasnodar Stadium	(Russia) Krasnodar – (Greece) PAOK	2−1	Cl. doors	(France) Turpin	
2020–21	Champions League	Play-off round	30–09–2020	Toumba Stadium	(Greece) PAOK – (Russia) Krasnodar	1−2	Cl. doors	(Italy) Orsato	
2024–25	Champions League	2nd Qual. Round	24–07–2024	Toumba Stadium	(Greece) PAOK – (Bosnia and Herzegovina) Borac Banja Luka	3−2	16,135	(Slovenia) Šmajc	
2024–25	Champions League	2nd Qual. Round	31–07–2024	Banja Luka City Stadium	(Bosnia and Herzegovina) Borac Banja Luka – (Greece) PAOK	0−1	9,500	(Netherlands) Van der Eijk	
2024–25	Champions League	3rd Qual. Round	06–08–2024	Eleda Stadion	(Sweden) Malmö FF – (Greece) PAOK	2−2	18,658	(Scotland) Beaton	
2024–25	Champions League	3rd Qual. Round	13–08–2024	Toumba Stadium	(Greece) PAOK – (Sweden) Malmö FF	3−4 (a.e.t.)	17,678	(Italy) Di Bello	

^{1}: The first leg finished 2–1 to Maccabi Tel Aviv but was awarded 3–0 against PAOK for fielding the suspended player Liasos Louka.
^{2}: Metalist Kharkiv were removed from the Champions League following their win over PAOK, after UEFA found them guilty of match fixing in the Ukrainian league in contravention of UEFA regulations. As a result, PAOK were reinstated in the Champions League.

=== Inter-Cities Fairs Cup / UEFA Cup / UEFA Europa League ===
Season	Competition	Round	Date	Venue	Opponent	Score	Attend.	Referee	Qual.
1965–66	Inter-Cities Fairs Cup	1st Round	15–09–1965	Kaftanzoglio Stadium	(Austria) PAOK – Wiener Sport-Club	2–1	11,051	Botić	
1965–66	Inter-Cities Fairs Cup	1st Round	29–09–1965	Praterstadion	(Austria) Wiener Sport-Club – PAOK	6–0		(Italy) de Marchi	
1967–68	Inter-Cities Fairs Cup	1st Round	13–09–1967	Kaftanzoglio Stadium	(Belgium) PAOK – RFC Liège	0–2	24,554	(Italy) Monti	
1967–68	Inter-Cities Fairs Cup	1st Round	20–09–1967	Vélodrome de Rocourt	(Belgium) RFC Liège – PAOK	3–2		Rasmussen	
1970–71	Inter-Cities Fairs Cup	1st Round	16–09–1970	Stadionul Republicii	(Romania) Dinamo București – PΑΟΚ	5–0		(Hungary) Gádor	
1970–71	Inter-Cities Fairs Cup	1st Round	30–09–1970	Toumba Stadium	(Romania) PAOK – Dinamo București	1–0	12,171	(Italy) Gonella	
1975–76	UEFA Cup	1st Round	16–09–1975	Toumba Stadium	(Spain) PAOK – Barcelona	1–0	45,200	(Romania) Petriceanu	
1975–76	UEFA Cup	1st Round	01–10–1975	Camp Nou	(Spain) Barcelona – PAOK	6–1	32,708	(England) Taylor	
1982–83	UEFA Cup	1st Round	15–09–1982	Toumba Stadium	(France) PAOK – Sochaux	1–0		(East Germany) Prokop	
1982–83	UEFA Cup	1st Round	29–09–1982	Stade Auguste Bonal	(France) Sochaux – PAOK	2–1 (a.e.t.)		(Wales) Bridges	
1982–83	UEFA Cup	2nd Round	20–10–1982	Toumba Stadium	(Spain) PAOK – Sevilla	2–0	17,725	(Netherlands) Corver	
1982–83	UEFA Cup	2nd Round	03–11–1982	R.S. Pizjuán Stadium	(Spain) Sevilla – PAOK	4–0		(Czechoslovakia) Christov	
1983–84	UEFA Cup	1st Round	14–09–1983	Plovdiv Stadium	(Bulgaria) Lokomotiv Plovdiv – PAOK	1–2		(West Germany) Tritschler	
1983–84	UEFA Cup	1st Round	28–09–1983	Toumba Stadium	(Bulgaria) PAOK – Lokomotiv Plovdiv	3–1		(Hungary) Palotai	
1983–84	UEFA Cup	2nd Round	19–10–1983	Toumba Stadium	(West Germany) PAOK – Bayern Munich	0–0	28,446	(Italy) Menicucci	
1983–84	UEFA Cup	2nd Round	02–11–1983	Munich Olympiastadion	(West Germany) Bayern Munich – PAOK	0–0 (9–8 p)	25,000	(England) Robinson	
1988–89	UEFA Cup	1st Round	07–09–1988	Stadio San Paolo	(Italy) Napoli – PAOK	1–0	62,662	(West Germany) Schmidhuber	
1988–89	UEFA Cup	1st Round	06–10–1988	Toumba Stadium	(Italy) PAOK – Napoli	1–1	39,848	(Austria) Brummeier	
1990–91	UEFA Cup	1st Round	19–09–1990	R.S. Pizjuán Stadium	(Spain) Sevilla – PAOK	0–0		(Austria) Kohl	
1990–91	UEFA Cup	1st Round	03–10–1990	Toumba Stadium	(Spain) PAOK – Sevilla	0–0 (3–4 p)		(Sweden) Karlsson	
1991–92	UEFA Cup	1st Round	18–09–1991	Toumba Stadium	(Belgium) PAOK – KV Mechelen	1–1		Mikkelsen	
1991–92	UEFA Cup	1st Round	02–10–1991	Achter de Kazerne	(Belgium) KV Mechelen – PAOK	0–1		(Portugal) dos Santos	
1991–92	UEFA Cup	2nd Round	23–10–1991	Toumba Stadium	(Austria) PAOK – Swarovski Tirol	0–2	Cl. doors	(Spain) Aladrén	
1991–92	UEFA Cup	2nd Round	06–11–1991	Old Tivoli Stadium	(Austria) Swarovski Tirol – PAOK	2–0		(Czechoslovakia) Christov	
1992–93	UEFA Cup	1st Round	16–09–1992	Parc des Princes	(France) Paris Saint-Germain – PAOK	2–0		(Scotland) McGinlay	
1992–93	UEFA Cup	1st Round	01–10–1992	Toumba Stadium	(France) PAOK – Paris Saint-Germain	0–3 (w/o) ^{1}		(Netherlands) Blankenstein	
1997–98	UEFA Cup	2nd Qual. Round	12–08–1997	Toumba Stadium	(Slovakia) PAOK – Spartak Trnava	5–3	26,492	(Austria) Stuchlik	
1997–98	UEFA Cup	2nd Qual. Round	26–08–1997	Štadión Malatinského	(Slovakia) Spartak Trnava – PAOK	0–1		(France) Colombo	
1997–98	UEFA Cup	1st Round	16–09–1997	Toumba Stadium	(England) PAOK – Arsenal	1–0	33,117	(Spain) Díaz Vega	
1997–98	UEFA Cup	1st Round	30–09–1997	Highbury Stadium	(England) Arsenal – PAOK	1–1	37,982	(Belgium) Piraux	
1997–98	UEFA Cup	2nd Round	21–10–1997	V. Calderón Stadium	(Spain) Atlético Madrid – PAOK	5–2		(Sweden) Nilsson	
1997–98	UEFA Cup	2nd Round	04–11–1997	Toumba Stadium	(Spain) PAOK – Atlético Madrid	4–4	25,378	(Scotland) Rowbotham	
1998–99	UEFA Cup	2nd Qual. Round	11–08–1998	Ibrox Stadium	(Scotland) Rangers – PAOK	2–0	35,392	(Denmark) Nielsen	
1998–99	UEFA Cup	2nd Qual. Round	25–08–1998	Toumba Stadium	(Scotland) PAOK – Rangers	0–0	30,388	(Germany) Merk	
1999–2000	UEFA Cup	1st Round	16–09–1999	Dinamo Arena	(Georgia (country)) Locomotive Tbilisi – PAOK	0–7	4,000	(Hungary) Juhos	
1999–2000	UEFA Cup	1st Round	30–09–1999	Toumba Stadium	(Georgia (country)) PAOK – Locomotive Tbilisi	2–0	2,399	(Republic of Ireland) Malcolm	
1999–2000	UEFA Cup	2nd Round	21–10–1999	Toumba Stadium	(Portugal) PAOK – Benfica	1–2	28,008	(Switzerland) Soch	
1999–2000	UEFA Cup	2nd Round	04–11–1999	Old da Luz Stadium	(Portugal) Benfica – PAOK	1–2 (4–1 p)	28,417	(Netherlands) Luinge	
2000–01	UEFA Cup	1st Round	14–09–2000	Toumba Stadium	(Israel) PAOK – Beitar Jerusalem	3–1	17,584	(Italy) Treossi	
2000–01	UEFA Cup	1st Round	28–09–2000	Teddy Stadium	(Israel) Beitar Jerusalem – PAOK	3–3	9,600	(Hungary) Juhos	
2000–01	UEFA Cup	2nd Round	24–10–2000	Stadio Friuli	(Italy) Udinese – PAOK	1–0	14,258	(Spain) Roca	
2000–01	UEFA Cup	2nd Round	09–11–2000	Toumba Stadium	(Italy) PAOK – Udinese	3–0 (a.e.t.)	24,324	(Germany) Fröhlich	
2000–01	UEFA Cup	3rd Round	23–11–2000	Philips Stadion	(Netherlands) PSV Eindhoven – PAOK	3–0	27,000	(Italy) Trentalange	
2000–01	UEFA Cup	3rd Round	07–12–2000	Toumba Stadium	(Netherlands) PAOK – PSV Eindhoven	0–1	12,691	(Scotland) Dougal	
2001–02	UEFA Cup	1st Round	20–09–2001	UPC Arena	(Austria) Kärnten – PAOK	0–0	4,230	(Republic of Ireland) McKeon	
2001–02	UEFA Cup	1st Round	27–09–2001	Toumba Stadium	(Austria) PAOK – Kärnten	4–0	7,376	(Portugal) da Silva	
2001–02	UEFA Cup	2nd Round	18–10–2001	Toumba Stadium	(Czech Republic) PAOK – Příbram	6–1	5,677	(Spain) Torres	
2001–02	UEFA Cup	2nd Round	01–11–2001	Na Litavce	(Czech Republic) Příbram – PAOK	2–2	2,225	(Denmark) Vollquartz	
2001–02	UEFA Cup	3rd Round	22–11–2001	Toumba Stadium	(Netherlands) PAOK – PSV Eindhoven	3–2	22,516	(France) Bré	
2001–02	UEFA Cup	3rd Round	06–12–2001	Philips Stadion	(Netherlands) PSV Eindhoven – PAOK	4–1	15,557	(Italy) Cesari	
2002–03	UEFA Cup	1st Round	17–09–2002	Estádio do Mar	(Portugal) Leixões – PAOK	2–1		(Slovenia) Čeferin	
2002–03	UEFA Cup	1st Round	03–10–2002	Toumba Stadium	(Portugal) PAOK – Leixões	4–1	5,960	(Germany) Steinborn	
2002–03	UEFA Cup	2nd Round	31–10–2002	Toumba Stadium	(Switzerland) PAOK – Grasshoppers	2–1	9,577	(Belgium) Huyghe	
2002–03	UEFA Cup	2nd Round	14–11–2002	Hardturm	(Switzerland) Grasshoppers – PAOK	1–1	6,600	(Sweden) Hansson	
2002–03	UEFA Cup	3rd Round	28–11–2002	Toumba Stadium	(Czech Republic) PAOK – Slavia Prague	1–0	16,113	(France) Sars	
2002–03	UEFA Cup	3rd Round	12–12–2002	Stadion E. Rošického	(Czech Republic) Slavia Prague – PAOK	4–0	8,563	(Spain) López Nieto	
2003–04	UEFA Cup	1st Round	24–09–2003	Toumba Stadium	(Norway) PAOK – Lyn Oslo	0–1	7,221	(Hungary) Hanacsek	
2003–04	UEFA Cup	1st Round	15–10–2003	Ullevaal Stadion	(Norway) Lyn Oslo – PAOK	0–3	2,068	(Slovenia) Čeferin	
2003–04	UEFA Cup	2nd Round	06–11–2003	Toumba Stadium	(Hungary) PAOK – Debreceni	1–1	8,701	(Croatia) Trivković	
2003–04	UEFA Cup	2nd Round	27–11–2003	Stadion Oláh Gábor Út	(Hungary) Debreceni – PAOK	0–0	6,429	(Israel) Yefet	
2004–05	UEFA Cup	1st Round	16–09–2004	Toumba Stadium	(Netherlands) PAOK – AZ	2–3	9,231	(Hungary) Szabó	
2004–05	UEFA Cup	1st Round	30–09–2004	Alkmaarderhout	(Netherlands) AZ – PAOK	2–1	7,923	(Austria) Brugger	
2005–06	UEFA Cup	1st Round	15–09–2005	Toumba Stadium	(Ukraine) PAOK – Metalurh Donetsk	1–1	7,893	(Spain) Santiago	
2005–06	UEFA Cup	1st Round	29–09–2005	Shakhtar Stadium	(Ukraine) Metalurh Donetsk – PAOK	2–2	15,000	(Netherlands) Vink	
2005–06	UEFA Cup	Group Stage (Group G)	20–10–2005	RSC Olimpiyskiy	(Ukraine) Shakhtar Donetsk – PΑΟΚ	1–0	25,500	(Republic of Ireland) Kelly	
2005–06	UEFA Cup	Group Stage (Group G)	24–11–2005	Toumba Stadium	(Germany) PAOK – Stuttgart	1–2	21,479	(Spain) Dávila	
2005–06	UEFA Cup	Group Stage (Group G)	01–12–2005	Stadionul Giulești	(Romania) Rapid București – PΑΟΚ	1–0	12,100	(Switzerland) Nobs	
2005–06	UEFA Cup	Group Stage (Group G)	14–12–2005	Toumba Stadium	(France) PAOK – Rennes	5–1	1,012	(Portugal) Costa	
2009–10	Europa League	3rd Qual. Round	30–07–2009	Ullevaal Stadion	(Norway) Vålerenga – PΑΟΚ	1–2	3,470	(Romania) Deaconu	
2009–10	Europa League	3rd Qual. Round	06–08–2009	Toumba Stadium	(Norway) PAOK – Vålerenga	0–1	22,130	(Italy) Banti	
2009–10	Europa League	Play-off Round	20–08–2009	Toumba Stadium	(Netherlands) PAOK – Heerenveen	1–1	22,403	(Scotland) Collum	
2009–10	Europa League	Play-off Round	27–08–2009	Abe Lenstra Stadion	(Netherlands) Heerenveen – PAOK	0–0	13,862	(Spain) González	
2010–11	Europa League	Play-off Round	19–08–2010	Toumba Stadium	(Turkey) PAOK – Fenerbahçe	1–0	23,353	(Germany) Gräfe	
2010–11	Europa League	Play-off Round	26–08–2010	Ş. Saracoğlu Stadium	(Turkey) Fenerbahçe – PAOK	1–1 (a.e.t.)	39,863	(Italy) Tagliavento	
2010–11	Europa League	Group Stage (Group D)	16–09–2010	Jan Breydel Stadium	(Belgium) Club Brugge – PAOK	1–1	17,525	(Sweden) Johannesson	
2010–11	Europa League	Group Stage (Group D)	30–09–2010	Toumba Stadium	(Croatia) PAOK – Dinamo Zagreb	1–0	17,927	(France) Fautrel	
2010–11	Europa League	Group Stage (Group D)	21–10–2010	Estadio El Madrigal	(Spain) Villarreal – PΑΟΚ	1–0	14,760	(Poland) Borski	
2010–11	Europa League	Group Stage (Group D)	04–11–2010	Toumba Stadium	(Spain) PAOK – Villarreal	1–0	22,779	(Netherlands) Braamhaar	
2010–11	Europa League	Group Stage (Group D)	02–12–2010	Toumba Stadium	(Belgium) PAOK – Club Brugge	1–1	19,424	(Northern Ireland) Courtney	
2010–11	Europa League	Group Stage (Group D)	15–12–2010	Stadion Maksimir	(Croatia) Dinamo Zagreb – PΑΟΚ	0–1	29,226	(England) Clattenburg	
2010–11	Europa League	Round of 32	17–02–2011	Toumba Stadium	(Russia) PAOK – CSKA Moscow	0–1	22,245	(England) Marriner	
2010–11	Europa League	Round of 32	22–02–2011	Luzhniki Stadium	(Russia) CSKA Moscow – PAOK	1–1	10,500	(France) Duhamel	
2011–12	Europa League	3rd Qual. Round	28–07–2011	Ullevaal Stadion	(Norway) Vålerenga – PΑΟΚ	0–2	3,019	(Croatia) Vučemilović	
2011–12	Europa League	3rd Qual. Round	04–08–2011	Toumba Stadium	(Norway) PAOK – Vålerenga	3–0	22,156	(Estonia) Tohver	
2011–12	Europa League	Play-off Round	18–08–2011	Toumba Stadium	(Ukraine) PAOK – Karpaty Lviv	2–0	21,424	(Poland) Małek	
2011–12	Europa League	Play-off Round	25–08–2011	Ukraina Stadium	(Ukraine) Karpaty Lviv – PΑΟΚ	1–1	20,000	(France) Fautrel	
2011–12	Europa League	Group Stage (Group A)	15–09–2011	Toumba Stadium	(England) PAOK – Tottenham Hotspur	0–0	24,645	(Serbia) Mažić	
2011–12	Europa League	Group Stage (Group A)	29–09–2011	Kazan Central Stadium	(Russia) Rubin Kazan – PAOK	2–2	14,350	(Sweden) Hansson	
2011–12	Europa League	Group Stage (Group A)	20–10–2011	Toumba Stadium	(Republic of Ireland) PAOK – Shamrock Rovers	2–1	12,776	(Finland) Asumaa	
2011–12	Europa League	Group Stage (Group A)	03–11–2011	Tallaght Stadium	(Republic of Ireland) Shamrock Rovers – PAOK	1–3	6,124	(Belarus) Kulbakov	
2011–12	Europa League	Group Stage (Group A)	30–11–2011	White Hart Lane	(England) Tottenham Hotspur – PAOK	1–2	26,229	(Netherlands) Nijhuis	
2011–12	Europa League	Group Stage (Group A)	15–12–2011	Toumba Stadium	(Russia) PAOK – Rubin Kazan	1–1	15,625	(Italy) Orsato	
2011–12	Europa League	Round of 32	16–02–2012	Stadio Friuli	(Italy) Udinese – PAOK	0–0	11,641	(Spain) Mallenco	
2011–12	Europa League	Round of 32	23–02–2012	Toumba Stadium	(Italy) PAOK – Udinese	0–3	22,400	(Norway) Hagen	
2012–13	Europa League	3rd Qual. Round	02–08–2012	Ramat Gan Stadium	(Israel) Bnei Yehuda – PAOK	0–2	2,156	(Montenegro) Radovanović	
2012–13	Europa League	3rd Qual. Round	09–08–2012	Toumba Stadium	(Israel) PAOK – Bnei Yehuda	4–1	9,544	(Romania) Balaj	
2012–13	Europa League	Play-off Round	23–08–2012	Toumba Stadium	(Austria) PAOK – Rapid Wien	2–1	19,628	(England) Marriner	
2012–13	Europa League	Play-off Round	30–08–2012	Gerhard Hanappi Stadium	(Austria) Rapid Wien – PAOK	3–0	16,500	(Spain) Gómez	
2013–14	Europa League	Group Stage (Group L)	19–09–2013	Toumba Stadium	(Kazakhstan) PAOK – Shakhter	2–1	Cl. doors	(France) Fautrel	
2013–14	Europa League	Group Stage (Group L)	03–10–2013	AFAS Stadion	(Netherlands) AZ – PAOK	1–1	10,761	(Italy) Banti	
2013–14	Europa League	Group Stage (Group L)	24–10–2013	Toumba Stadium	(Israel) PAOK – Maccabi Haifa	3–2	14,211	(Spain) Teixeira	
2013–14	Europa League	Group Stage (Group L)	07–11–2013	Kiryat Eliezer Stadium	(Israel) Maccabi Haifa – PAOK	0–0	10,000	(Germany) Zwayer	
2013–14	Europa League	Group Stage (Group L)	28–11–2013	Astana Arena	(Kazakhstan) Shakhter – PAOK	0–2	7,556	(Belgium) Gumienny	
2013–14	Europa League	Group Stage (Group L)	12–12–2013	Toumba Stadium	(Netherlands) PAOK – AZ	2–2	11,211	(England) Oliver	
2013–14	Europa League	Round of 32	20–02–2014	Toumba Stadium	(Portugal) PAOK – Benfica	0–1	24,670	(Germany) Stark	
2013–14	Europa League	Round of 32	27–02–2014	Da Luz Stadium	(Portugal) Benfica – PAOK	3–0	31,058	(Poland) Marciniak	
2014–15	Europa League	Play-off Round	21–08–2014	Zimbru Stadium	(Moldova) Zimbru Chișinău – PAOK	1–0	8,530	(Czech Republic) Kovařík	
2014–15	Europa League	Play-off Round	28–08–2014	Toumba Stadium	(Moldova) PAOK – Zimbru Chișinău	4–0	14,843	(Ukraine) Boyko	
2014–15	Europa League	Group Stage (Group K)	18–09–2014	Toumba Stadium	(Belarus) PAOK – Dinamo Minsk	6–1	13,416	(Finland) Gestranius	
2014–15	Europa League	Group Stage (Group K)	02–10–2014	Stade du Roudourou	(France) Guingamp – PAOK	2–0	8,783	(Lithuania) Mažeika	
2014–15	Europa League	Group Stage (Group K)	23–10–2014	Toumba Stadium	(Italy) PAOK – Fiorentina	0–1	22,612	(Germany) Zwayer	
2014–15	Europa League	Group Stage (Group K)	06–11–2014	Stadio Artemio Franchi	(Italy) Fiorentina – PAOK	1–1	15,316	(Belgium) Delferière	
2014–15	Europa League	Group Stage (Group K)	27–11–2014	Borisov Arena	(Belarus) Dinamo Minsk – PAOK	0–2	1,502	(Austria) Schörgenhofer	
2014–15	Europa League	Group Stage (Group K)	11–12–2014	Toumba Stadium	(France) PAOK – Guingamp	1–2	12,101	(Netherlands) Blom	
2015–16	Europa League	2nd Qual. Round	16–07–2015	Stadion Kranjčevićeva	(Croatia) Lokomotiva – PΑΟΚ	2–1	1,000	(Ukraine) Mozharovsky	
2015–16	Europa League	2nd Qual. Round	23–07–2015	Toumba Stadium	(Croatia) PAOK – Lokomotiva	6–0	11,861	(Portugal) Xistra	
2015–16	Europa League	3rd Qual. Round	30–07–2015	Toumba Stadium	(Slovakia) PAOK – Spartak Trnava	1–0	12,427	(Norway) Edvartsen	
2015–16	Europa League	3rd Qual. Round	06–08–2015	Štadión FC ViOn	(Slovakia) Spartak Trnava – PAOK	1–1	3,555	(Germany) Welz	
2015–16	Europa League	Play-off Round	20–08–2015	Toumba Stadium	(Denmark) PAOK – Brøndby	5–0	20,106	(Spain) Mallenco	
2015–16	Europa League	Play-off Round	27–08–2015	Brøndby Stadium	(Denmark) Brøndby – PAOK	1–1	6,630	(Italy) Tagliavento	
2015–16	Europa League	Group Stage (Group C)	17–09–2015	Bakcell Arena	(Azerbaijan) Gabala – PAOK	0–0	7,500	(Spain) Estrada	
2015–16	Europa League	Group Stage (Group C)	01–10–2015	Toumba Stadium	(Germany) PAOK – Borussia Dortmund	1–1	25,663	(England) Taylor	
2015–16	Europa League	Group Stage (Group C)	22–10–2015	Toumba Stadium	(Russia) PAOK – Krasnodar	0–0	9,325	(Sweden) Ekberg	
2015–16	Europa League	Group Stage (Group C)	05–11–2015	Kuban Stadium	(Russia) Krasnodar – PAOK	2–1	15,550	(Northern Ireland) Hunter	
2015–16	Europa League	Group Stage (Group C)	26–11–2015	Toumba Stadium	(Azerbaijan) PAOK – Gabala	0–0	6,131	(Denmark) Kehlet	
2015–16	Europa League	Group Stage (Group C)	10–12–2015	Signal Iduna Park	(Germany) Borussia Dortmund – PAOK	0–1	55,200	(Finland) Gestranius	
2016–17	Europa League	Play-off Round	18–08–2016	Dinamo Arena	(Georgia (country)) Dinamo Tbilisi – PAOK	0–3	12,006	(Israel) Liany	
2016–17	Europa League	Play-off Round	25–08–2016	Toumba Stadium	(Georgia (country)) PAOK – Dinamo Tbilisi	2–0	14,821	(Austria) Lechner	
2016–17	Europa League	Group Stage (Group J)	15–09–2016	Toumba Stadium	(Italy) PAOK – Fiorentina	0–0	20,904	(Slovenia) Vinčić	
2016–17	Europa League	Group Stage (Group J)	29–09–2016	Stadion u Nisy	(Czech Republic) Slovan Liberec – PAOK	1–2	8,880	(Hungary) Bognár	
2016–17	Europa League	Group Stage (Group J)	20–10–2016	T. Bahramov Stadium	(Azerbaijan) Qarabağ – PAOK	2–0	26,784	(Israel) Yefet	
2016–17	Europa League	Group Stage (Group J)	03–11–2016	Toumba Stadium	(Azerbaijan) PAOK – Qarabağ	0–1	11,476	(Scotland) Beaton	
2016–17	Europa League	Group Stage (Group J)	24–11–2016	Stadio Artemio Franchi	(Italy) Fiorentina – PAOK	2–3	12,793	(Switzerland) Klossner	
2016–17	Europa League	Group Stage (Group J)	08–12–2016	Toumba Stadium	(Czech Republic) PAOK – Slovan Liberec	2–0	11,463	(England) Marriner	
2016–17	Europa League	Round of 32	16–02–2017	Toumba Stadium	(Germany) PAOK – Schalke 04	0–3	25,593	(Spain) Estrada	
2016–17	Europa League	Round of 32	22–02–2017	Veltins-Arena	(Germany) Schalke 04 – PAOK	1–1	50,619	(Italy) Banti	
2017–18	Europa League	3rd Qual. Round	27–07–2017	V. Lobanovskyi Stadium	(Ukraine) Olimpik Donetsk – PAOK	1–1	2,632	(Switzerland) Bieri	
2017–18	Europa League	3rd Qual. Round	03–08–2017	Toumba Stadium	(Ukraine) PAOK – Olimpik Donetsk	2–0	13,960	(Bulgaria) Stoyanov	
2017–18	Europa League	Play-off Round	17–08–2017	Toumba Stadium	(Sweden) PAOK – Östersund	3–1	16,743	(Netherlands) Nijhuis	
2017–18	Europa League	Play-off Round	24–08–2017	Jämtkraft Arena	(Sweden) Östersund – PAOK	2–0	5,697	(Poland) Raczkowski	
2018–19	Europa League	Group Stage (Group L)	20–09–2018	Toumba Stadium	(England) PAOK – Chelsea	0–1	24,310	(Spain) Undiano Mallenco	
2018–19	Europa League	Group Stage (Group L)	04–10–2018	Borisov Arena	(Belarus) BATE Borisov – PAOK	1–4	10,527	(Austria) Schörgenhofer	
2018–19	Europa League	Group Stage (Group L)	25–10–2018	Toumba Stadium	(Hungary) PAOK – MOL Vidi	0–2	15,118	(Ukraine) Aranovskiy	
2018–19	Europa League	Group Stage (Group L)	08–11–2018	Groupama Arena	(Hungary) MOL Vidi – PAOK	1–0	17,208	(Turkey) Palabiyik	
2018–19	Europa League	Group Stage (Group L)	29–11–2018	Stamford Bridge	(England) Chelsea – PAOK	4–0	33,933	(Estonia) Tohver	
2018–19	Europa League	Group Stage (Group L)	13–12–2018	Toumba Stadium	(Belarus) PAOK – BATE Borisov	1–3	13,483	(Germany) Welz	
2019–20	Europa League	Play-off Round	22–08–2019	Tehelné pole	(Slovakia) Slovan Bratislava – PAOK	1–0	20,233	(Croatia) Bebek	
2019–20	Europa League	Play-off Round	29–08–2019	Toumba Stadium	(Slovakia) PAOK – Slovan Bratislava	3–2	20,776	(Sweden) Ekberg	
2020–21	Europa League	Group Stage (Group E)	22–10–2020	Toumba Stadium	(Cyprus) PAOK – Omonia	1–1	Cl. doors	(Scotland) Madden	
2020–21	Europa League	Group Stage (Group E)	29–10–2020	Nuevo Los Cármenes	(Spain) Granada – PAOK	0–0	Cl. doors	(Portugal) Tiago Martins	
2020–21	Europa League	Group Stage (Group E)	05–11–2020	Toumba Stadium	(Netherlands) PAOK – PSV	4–1	Cl. doors	(Poland) Stefański	
2020–21	Europa League	Group Stage (Group E)	26–11–2020	Philips Stadion	(Netherlands) PSV – PAOK	3–2	Cl. doors	(Latvia) Treimanis	
2020–21	Europa League	Group Stage (Group E)	03–12–2020	GSP Stadium	(Cyprus) Omonia – PAOK	2–1	Cl. doors	(England) Pawson	
2020–21	Europa League	Group Stage (Group E)	10–12–2020	Toumba Stadium	(Spain) PAOK – Granada	0–0	Cl. doors	(Scotland) Beaton	
2024–25	Europa League	Play-off Round	22-08-2024	Toumba Stadium	(Republic of Ireland) PAOK – Shamrock Rovers	4–0	13,871	(Albania) Jorgji	
2024–25	Europa League	Play-off Round	29–08–2024	Tallaght Stadium	(Republic of Ireland) Shamrock Rovers – PAOK	0–2	5,079	(Lithuania) Rumšas	
2024–25	Europa League	League phase	25–09–2024	Rams Park	(Turkey) Galatasaray – PAOK	3–1	50,700	(Spain) Hernández Hernández	
2024–25	Europa League	League phase	3–10–2024	Toumba Stadium	(Romania) PAOK – FCSB	0–1	14,340	(Germany) Stegemann	
2024–25	Europa League	League phase	24–10–2024	Toumba Stadium	(Czech Republic) PAOK – Viktoria Plzeň	2–2	16,144	(Switzerland) Schnyder	
2024–25	Europa League	League phase	7–11–2024	Old Trafford	(England) Manchester United – PAOK	2–0	73,174	(Romania) Petrescu	
2024–25	Europa League	League phase	28–11–2024	Daugava Stadium	(Latvia) RFS – PAOK	0–2	5,346	(Austria) Weinberger	
2024–25	Europa League	League phase	12–12–2024	Toumba Stadium	(Hungary) PAOK – Ferencváros	5–0	18,121	(Spain) Cuadra Fernández	
2024–25	Europa League	League phase	23–1–2025	Toumba Stadium	(Czech Republic) PAOK – Slavia	2–0	17,507	(Slovenia) Jug	
2024–25	Europa League	League phase	30–1–2025	Anoeta	(Spain) Real Sociedad – PAOK	2–0	23,872	(Scotland) Beaton	
2024–25	Europa League	Knockout phase play-offs	13–02–2025	Toumba Stadium	(Romania) PAOK – FCSB	1–2	18,343	(Belgium) Visser	
2024–25	Europa League	Knockout phase play-offs	20–02–2025	Arena Națională	(Romania) FCSB – PAOK	2–0	50,248	(Slovenia) Jug	
2025–26	Europa League	3rd Qual. Round	07-08-2025	Toumba Stadium	(Austria) PAOK – Wolfsberger AC	0–0	21,340	(Denmark) Krogh	
2025–26	Europa League	3rd Qual. Round	14–08–2025	Wörthersee Stadion	(Austria) Wolfsberger AC – PAOK	0–1	6,720	(Israel) Grinfeld	
2025–26	Europa League	Play-off Round	21–08–2025	Stadion Rujevica	(Croatia) Rijeka – PAOK	1–0	6,882	(Slovakia) Kružliak	
2025–26	Europa League	Play-off Round	28-08-2025	Toumba Stadium	(Croatia) PAOK – Rijeka	5–0	24,223	(Spain) Sánchez Martínez	
2025–26	Europa League	League phase	24-09-2025	Toumba Stadium	(Israel) PAOK - Maccabi Tel Aviv	0–0	19,667	(Germany) Jablonski	
2025–26	Europa League	League phase	02-10-2025	Balaídos	(Spain) Celta Vigo - PAOK	3–1	20,849	(Croatia) Pajač	
2025–26	Europa League	League phase	23-10-2025	Stade Pierre-Mauroy	(France) Lille - PAOK	3–4	23,666	(Montenegro) Dabanović	
2025–26	Europa League	League phase	06-11-2025	Toumba Stadium	(Switzerland) PAOK - Young Boys	4–0	21,608	(Serbia) Jovanović	
2025–26	Europa League	League phase	27-11-2025	Toumba Stadium	(Norway) PAOK - Brann	1–1	16,005	(Germany) Stegemann	
2025–26	Europa League	League phase	11-12-2025	Huvepharma Arena	(Bulgaria) Ludogorets Razgrad - PAOK	3–3	6,433	(Romania) Feșnic	
2025–26	Europa League	League phase	22-01-2026	Toumba Stadium	(Spain) PAOK - Real Betis	2–0	22,221	(Italy) Sozza	
2025–26	Europa League	League phase	29-01-2026	Parc Olympique Lyonnais	(France) Lyon - PAOK	4–2	26,149	(Spain) Bengoetxea	
2025–26	Europa League	Knockout phase play-offs	19-02-2026	Toumba Stadium	(Spain) PAOK - Celta Vigo	1–2	20,448	(Slovakia) Kružliak	
2025–26	Europa League	Knockout phase play-offs	26-02-2026	Balaídos	(Spain) Celta Vigo - PAOK	1–0	21,344	(Italy) Guida	
2026–27	Europa League	2nd Qual. Round	23-07-2026	Arena Lublin	(Ukraine) Dynamo Kyiv – PAOK	2–3	3,225	(Denmark) Putros	
2026–27	Europa League	2nd Qual. Round	30–07–2026	Toumba Stadium	(Ukraine) PAOK – Dynamo Kyiv	2–0	18,760	(Poland) Sylwestrzak	
2026–27	Europa League	3rd Qual. Round	06-08-2026	Toumba Stadium	(Belgium) PAOK – Anderlecht	0–1	19,161	(Spain) Martínez Munuera	
2026–27	Europa League	3rd Qual. Round	13–08–2026	Constant Vanden Stock Stadium	(Belgium) Anderlecht – PAOK	3–2	17,976	(Italy) Sozza	

^{1}: The game was 2–0 to PSG at half-time. Due to fightings in Toumba Stadium between PAOK fans and police, Dutch referee John Blankenstein decided to stop game. On October 4 UEFA awarded 3–0 to PSG.

=== UEFA Conference League ===
Season	Competition	Round	Date	Venue	Opponent	Score	Attend.	Referee	Qual.
2021–22	Conference League	3rd Qual. Round	03–08–2021	Aviva Stadium	(Republic of Ireland) Bohemians – PAOK	2–1	6,500	(Finland) Manukka	
2021–22	Conference League	3rd Qual. Round	12–08–2021	Toumba Stadium	(Republic of Ireland) PAOK – Bohemians	2–0	N/A	(Austria) Weinberger	
2021–22	Conference League	Play-off round	19–08–2021	Toumba Stadium	(Croatia) PAOK – Rijeka	1–1	8,091	(France) Brisard	
2021–22	Conference League	Play-off round	26–08–2021	Stadion Rujevica	(Croatia) Rijeka – PAOK	0–2	6,722	(Ukraine) Boiko	
2021–22	Conference League	Group Stage (Group F)	16–09–2021	Victoria Stadium	(Gibraltar) Lincoln Red Imps – PAOK	0–2	668	(Republic of Ireland) Harvey	
2021–22	Conference League	Group Stage (Group F)	30–09–2021	Toumba Stadium	(Slovakia) PAOK – Slovan Bratislava	1–1	7,537	(Portugal) Pinheiro	
2021–22	Conference League	Group Stage (Group F)	21–10–2021	Parken Stadium	(Denmark) Copenhagen – PAOK	1–2	19,552	(Belgium) Lambrechts	
2021–22	Conference League	Group Stage (Group F)	04–11–2021	Toumba Stadium	(Denmark) PAOK – Copenhagen	1–2	11,166	(Poland) Raczkowski	
2021–22	Conference League	Group Stage (Group F)	25–11–2021	Tehelné pole	(Slovakia) Slovan Bratislava – PAOK	0–0	200	(Netherlands) Higler	
2021–22	Conference League	Group Stage (Group F)	09–12–2021	Toumba Stadium	(Gibraltar) PAOK – Lincoln Red Imps	2–0	4,648	(Norway) Saggi	
2021–22	Conference League	Knockout round play-offs	17–02–2022	MCH Arena	(Denmark) Midtjylland – PAOK	1–0	7,088	(England) Pawson	
2021–22	Conference League	Knockout round play-offs	24–02–2022	Toumba Stadium	(Denmark) PAOK – Midtjylland	2–1 (5–3 p)	7,468	(Belgium) Visser	
2021–22	Conference League	Round of 16	10–03–2022	Toumba Stadium	(Belgium) PAOK – Gent	1–0	9,098	(Poland) Frankowski	
2021–22	Conference League	Round of 16	17–03–2022	Ghelamco Arena	(Belgium) Gent – PAOK	1–2	12,388	(Germany) Siebert	
2021–22	Conference League	Quarter-finals	07–04–2022	Stade Vélodrome	(France) Marseille – PAOK	2–1	45,182	(Poland) Marciniak	
2021–22	Conference League	Quarter-finals	14–04–2022	Toumba Stadium	(France) PAOK – Marseille	0–1	27,648	(Netherlands) Makkelie	
2022–23	Conference League	2nd Qual. Round	21–07–2022	Vivacom Arena	(Bulgaria) Levski Sofia – PAOK	2–0	17,534	(France) Pignard	
2022–23	Conference League	2nd Qual. Round	28–07–2022	Toumba Stadium	(Bulgaria) PAOK – Levski Sofia	1–1	15,000	(Spain) Soto Grado	
2023–24	Conference League	2nd Qual. Round	27–07–2023	Toumba Stadium	(Israel) PAOK – Beitar Jerusalem	0–0	16,851	(Ukraine) Balakin	
2023–24	Conference League	2nd Qual. Round	03–08–2023	Teddy Stadium	(Israel) Beitar Jerusalem – PAOK	1–4	26,557	(France) Millot	
2023–24	Conference League	3rd Qual. Round	10–08–2023	Stadion Poljud	(Croatia) Hajduk Split – PAOK	0–0	33,573	(Denmark) Krogh	
2023–24	Conference League	3rd Qual. Round	17–08–2023	Toumba Stadium	(Croatia) PAOK – Hajduk Split	3–0	24,133	(Germany) Stegemann	
2023–24	Conference League	Play-off round	24–08–2023	Tynecastle Park	(Scotland) Heart of Midlothian – PAOK	1–2	17,409	(Latvia) Treimanis	
2023–24	Conference League	Play-off round	31–08–2023	Toumba Stadium	(Scotland) PAOK – Heart of Midlothian	4–0	19,032	(Spain) Cuadra	
2023–24	Conference League	Group Stage (Group G)	21–09–2023	Bolt Arena	(Finland) HJK – PAOK	2–3	8,532	(Romania) Barbu	
2023–24	Conference League	Group Stage (Group G)	5-10–2023	Toumba Stadium	(Germany) PAOK – Eintracht Frankfurt	2–1	21,549	(Italy) Sozza	
2023–24	Conference League	Group Stage (Group G)	26–10–2023	Pittodrie Stadium	(Scotland) Aberdeen – PAOK	2–3	16,089	(Austria) Gishamer	
2023–24	Conference League	Group Stage (Group G)	09–11–2023	Toumba Stadium	(Scotland) PAOK – Aberdeen	2–2	19,019	(Albania) Xhaja	
2023–24	Conference League	Group Stage (Group G)	30–11–2023	Deutsche Bank Park	(Germany) Eintracht Frankfurt – PAOK	1–2	58,000	(Poland) Sylwestrzak	
2023–24	Conference League	Group Stage (Group G)	14–12–2023	Toumba Stadium	(Finland) PAOK – HJK	4–2	13,696	(Georgia (country)) Kruashvili	
2023–24	Conference League	Round of 16	07–03–2024	Stadion Maksimir	(Croatia) Dinamo Zagreb – PAOK	2–0	18,562	(Azerbaijan) Aghayev	
2023–24	Conference League	Round of 16	14–03–2024	Toumba Stadium	(Croatia) PAOK – Dinamo Zagreb	5–1	19,701	(Germany) Osmers	
2023–24	Conference League	Quarter-finals	11-04-2024	Jan Breydel Stadium	(Belgium) Club Brugge – PAOK	1–0	19,917	(Germany) Siebert	
2023–24	Conference League	Quarter-finals	18–04–2024	Toumba Stadium	(Belgium) PAOK – Club Brugge	0–2	24,738	(Italy) Massa	
2026–27	Conference League	Play-off Round	20–08–2026	Toumba Stadium	(Norway) PAOK – Brann	1–1	14,667	(Germany) Siebert	
2026–27	Conference League	Play-off Round	27–08–2026	Brann Stadion	(Norway) Brann – PAOK	3–2	15,483	(England) Brooks	

=== European Cup Winners' Cup ===
Season	Competition	Round	Date	Venue	Opponent	Score	Attend.	Referee	Qual.
1972–73	Cup Winners' Cup	1st Round	13–09–1972	Praterstadion	(Austria) Rapid Wien – PAOK	0–0		(Italy) Francescon	
1972–73	Cup Winners' Cup	1st Round	27–09–1972	Toumba Stadium	(Austria) PAOK – Rapid Wien	2–2	32,420	(Hungary) Palotai	
1973–74	Cup Winners' Cup	1st Round	19–09–1973	Polish Army Stadium	(Poland) Legia Warsaw – PAOK	1–1	12,047	(Austria) Bucek	
1973–74	Cup Winners' Cup	1st Round	03–10–1973	Toumba Stadium	(Poland) PAOK – Legia Warsaw	1–0	36,711	(Romania) Limona	
1973–74	Cup Winners' Cup	2nd Round	24–10–1973	Stade de Gerland	(France) Lyon – PAOK	3–3	26,250	(Northern Ireland) Wright	
1973–74	Cup Winners' Cup	2nd Round	07–11–1973	Toumba Stadium	(France) PAOK – Lyon	4–0	30,416	(Italy) Gonella	
1973–74	Cup Winners' Cup	Quarter-finals	13–03–1974	San Siro	(Italy) Milan – PAOK	3–0	25,963	(Malta) Bonett	
1973–74	Cup Winners' Cup	Quarter-finals	20–03–1974	Toumba Stadium	(Italy) PAOK – Milan	2–2	43,882	(Belgium) Loraux	
1974–75	Cup Winners' Cup	1st Round	18–09–1974	Toumba Stadium	PAOK – Red Star Belgrade	1–0	39,167	(Italy) Serafino	
1974–75	Cup Winners' Cup	1st Round	02–10–1974	Red Star Stadium	Red Star Belgrade – PAOK	2–0 (a.e.t.)		(Switzerland) Bucheli	
1977–78	Cup Winners' Cup	1st Round	14–09–1977	Toumba Stadium	(Poland) PAOK – Zagłębie	2–0	23,328	(Italy) Michelotti	
1977–78	Cup Winners' Cup	1st Round	28–09–1977	Stadion Ludowy	(Poland) Zagłębie – PAOK	0–2		(Scotland) McGinlay	
1977–78	Cup Winners' Cup	2nd Round	19–10–1977	Vejle Stadion	Vejle – PAOK	3–0		(West Germany) Biwersi	
1977–78	Cup Winners' Cup	2nd Round	02–11–1977	Toumba Stadium	PAOK – Vejle	2–1		(Romania) Rainea	
1978–79	Cup Winners' Cup	1st Round	13–09–1978	Toumba Stadium	(Switzerland) PAOK – Servette	2–0	18,370	(Romania) Bărbulescu	
1978–79	Cup Winners' Cup	1st Round	27–09–1978	Charmilles Stadium	(Switzerland) Servette – PAOK	4–0		(Hungary) Pádár	
1981–82	Cup Winners' Cup	1st Round	16–09–1981	Waldstadion	(West Germany) Eintracht Frankfurt – PAOK	2–0	22,000	(Scotland) Valentine	
1981–82	Cup Winners' Cup	1st Round	30–09–1981	Toumba Stadium	(West Germany) PAOK – Eintracht Frankfurt	2–0 (4–5 p)	23,503	(Hungary) Kuti	

=== Scorers ===
Season	Opponent	Score	Scorers
1965–66	(Austria) PAOK – Wiener Sport-Club	2–1	Koudas 63', Mouratidis 73' – Hof 52'
1965–66	(Austria) Wiener Sport-Club – PAOK	6–0	Hof 2', 26', 83', 90', Gayer 13', 54'
1967–68	(Belgium) PAOK – Royal Liège	0–2	Martaga 3', Banović 10'
1967–68	(Belgium) Royal Liège – PAOK	3–2	Andrie 10', Martaga 30', 66' – Afentoulidis 28', Makris 80'
1970–71	(Romania) Dinamo București – PΑΟΚ	5–0	Dumitrache 8', 51', 73', Popescu 65', 83'
1970–71	(Romania) PAOK – Dinamo București	1–0	Koudas 81'
1972–73	(Austria) Rapid Wien – PAOK	0–0	—
1972–73	(Austria) PAOK – Rapid Wien	2–2	Sarafis 32' (pen.), Aslanidis 90'+2' – Gallos 23', Krankl 43'
1973–74	(Poland) Legia Warsaw – PAOK	1–1	Pieszko 60' – Terzanidis 51'
1973–74	(Poland) PAOK – Legia Warsaw	1–0	Paridis 80'
1973–74	(France) Lyon – PAOK	3–3	Chiesa 10', Di Nallo 51', Ravier 65' – Aslanidis 44', Terzanidis 50', Sarafis 81'
1973–74	(France) PAOK – Lyon	4–0	Paridis 25', 61', Aslanidis 38' (pen.), Terzanidis 80'
1973–74	(Italy) Milan – PAOK	3–0	Bigon 13', Benetti 38', Chiarugi 87'
1973–74	(Italy) PAOK – Milan	2–2	Sarafis 30', 74' – Bigon 56', Tresoldi 78'
1974–75	PAOK – Red Star Belgrade	1–0	Terzanidis 67'
1974–75	Red Star Belgrade – PAOK	2–0 (a.e.t.)	Petrović 59', Pellios 103' (o.g.)
1975–76	(Spain) PAOK – Barcelona	1–0	Koudas 74'
1975–76	(Spain) Barcelona – PAOK	6–1	Neeskens 25' (pen.), 57' (pen.), Rexach 43', 66', 81', Cruyff 53' – Anastasiadis 78'
1976–77	(Cyprus) Omonia – PAOK	0–2	Koudas 39', Sarafis 87'
1976–77	(Cyprus) PAOK – Omonia	1–1	Sarafis 68' – Dimitriou 34'
1976–77	Dynamo Kyiv – PAOK	4–0	Buryak 14', 22', Kolotov 26', Slobodyan 59'
1976–77	PAOK – Dynamo Kyiv	0–2	Kolotov 71', Blokhin 81'
1977–78	(Poland) PAOK – Zagłębie	2–0	Pellios 25', Anastasiadis 79' (pen.)
1977–78	(Poland) Zagłębie – PAOK	0–2	Kermanidis 47', Damanakis 69'
1977–78	Vejle – PAOK	3–0	Eg 12', Jacquet 80', Østergaard 89'
1977–78	PAOK – Vejle	2–1	Orfanos 23', Kermanidis 89' – Jacquet 74'
1978–79	(Switzerland) PAOK – Servette	2–0	Kermanidis 76', Sarafis 86'
1978–79	(Switzerland) Servette – PAOK	4–0	Pfister 15', Hamberg 64', Elia 85', 88'
1981–82	(West Germany) Eintracht Frankfurt – PAOK	2–0	Pezzey 12', Körbel 78'
1981–82	(West Germany) PAOK – Eintracht Frankfurt	2–0 (4–5 p.)	Kostikos 37', 61'
1982–83	(France) PAOK – Sochaux	1–0	Dimopoulos 79'
1982–83	(France) Sochaux – PAOK	2–1 (a.e.t.)	Anziani 90'+1' (pen.), 98' – Dimopoulos 95'
1982–83	(Spain) PAOK – Sevilla	2–0	Dimopoulos 49', Kostikos 61'
1982–83	(Spain) Sevilla – PAOK	4–0	Santi 19', Lopez 40', Magdaleno 57', Pintinho 90'
1983–84	(Bulgaria) Lokomotiv Plovdiv – PAOK	1–2	Sadakov 71' (pen.) – Dimopoulos 42', Georgopoulos 48'
1983–84	(Bulgaria) PAOK – Lokomotiv Plovdiv	3–1	Kostikos 44', Skartados 68', Dimopoulos 76' (pen.) – Eranosyan 13'
1983–84	(West Germany) PAOK – Bayern Munich	0–0	—
1983–84	(West Germany) Bayern Munich – PAOK	0–0 (9–8 p.)	—
1985–86	(Italy) Hellas Verona – PAOK	3–1	Elkjær 13', 85', Volpati 87' – Skartados 71'
1985–86	(Italy) PAOK – Hellas Verona	1–2	Vasilakos 4' – Elkjær 30', 73'
1988–89	(Italy) Napoli – PAOK	1–0	Maradona 58' (pen.)
1988–89	(Italy) PAOK – Napoli	1–1	Skartados 64' – Careca 18'
1990–91	(Spain) Sevilla – PAOK	0–0	—
1990–91	(Spain) PAOK – Sevilla	0–0 (3–4 p.)	—
1991–92	(Belgium) PAOK – KV Mechelen	1–1	Skartados 39' – Ingesson 62'
1991–92	(Belgium) KV Mechelen – PAOK	0–1	Borbokis 86'
1991–92	(Austria) PAOK – Swarovski Tirol	0–2	Westerthaler 52', 79'
1991–92	(Austria) Swarovski Tirol – PAOK	2–0	Westerthaler 27', 66'
1992–93	(France) Paris Saint-Germain – PAOK	2–0	Weah 14', 24'
1992–93	(France) PAOK – Paris Saint-Germain	0–3 (w/o)	(Weah 16', Sassus 33')
1997–98	(Slovakia) PAOK – Spartak Trnava	5–3	Zagorakis 32' (pen.), Marangos 35', 45'+2', Frantzeskos 52', Olivares 80' – Ujlaky 22', 27', Luhový 24'
1997–98	(Slovakia) Spartak Trnava – PAOK	0–1	Zagorakis 80'
1997–98	(England) PAOK – Arsenal	1–0	Frantzeskos 61'
1997–98	(England) Arsenal – PAOK	1–1	Bergkamp 22' – Vryzas 87'
1997–98	(Spain) Atlético Madrid – PAOK	5–2	Vieri 8', 32', 53', Lardín 11', Kiko 74' – Frantzeskos 20', Marangos 64'
1997–98	(Spain) PAOK – Atlético Madrid	4–4	Frantzeskos 17', Olivares 55', Zagorakis 76' (pen.), Ζouboulis 81' – Lardín 2', Bogdanović 28', Santi 51', Kiko 90'+2'
1998–99	(Scotland) Rangers – PAOK	2–0	Kanchelskis 55', Wallace 69'
1998–99	(Scotland) PAOK – Rangers	0–0	—
1999–00	(Georgia (country)) Locomotive Tbilisi – PAOK	0–7	Georgiadis 17', 25', Sabry 43', Frousos 56', 62', Marangos 67', Frantzeskos 69'
1999–00	(Georgia (country)) PAOK – Locomotive Tbilisi	2–0	Valencia 52' (pen.), Salpingidis 88'
1999–00	(Portugal) PAOK – Benfica	1–2	Frantzeskos 90' – Gomes 68', Ronaldo 90'+4'
1999–00	(Portugal) Benfica – PAOK	1–2 (4–1 p.)	Kandaurov 25' – Marangos 28', Sabry 43'
2000–01	(Israel) PAOK – Beitar Jerusalem	3–1	Camps 45', Cohen 49' (o.g.), Nalitzis 55' – Hamar 39'
2000–01	(Israel) Beitar Jerusalem – PAOK	3–3	Sivilia 45', 61', Abukasis 54' (pen.) – Katsabis 16', Nalitzis 43', Konstantinidis 90'
2000–01	(Italy) Udinese – PAOK	1–0	Margiotta 90'+4'
2000–01	(Italy) PAOK – Udinese	3–0 (a.e.t.)	Camps 73', 102', Frousos 108'
2000–01	(Netherlands) PSV Eindhoven – PAOK	3–0	Bruggink 5', Kežman 15', 44'
2000–01	(Netherlands) PAOK – PSV Eindhoven	0–1	Bruggink 43'
2001–02	(Austria) Kärnten – PAOK	0–0	—
2001–02	(Austria) PAOK – Kärnten	4–0	Konstantinidis 25', 52', Kafes 51', Luciano 75'
2001–02	(Czech Republic) PAOK – Příbram	6–1	Yiasoumi 22', 28', Okkas 37', 88', Konstantinidis 50', Luciano 75' – Siegl 56'
2001–02	(Czech Republic) Příbram – PAOK	2–2	Čížek 35', Kučera 62' – Luciano 17', Yiasoumi 60'
2001–02	(Netherlands) PAOK – PSV Eindhoven	3–2	Yiasoumi 36', 69', Udeze 39' – de Jong 20', Bruggink 81'
2001–02	(Netherlands) PSV Eindhoven – PAOK	4–1	Hesselink 2', 58', Gakhokidze 32', Van Bommel 90'+2' (pen.) – Luciano 59'
2002–03	(Portugal) Leixões – PAOK	2–1	Brito 4', Detinho 52' – Kukiełka 25'
2002–03	(Portugal) PAOK – Leixões	4–1	Salpingidis 14', Okkas 18', 81', Koutsopoulos 57' – Pedras 83'
2002–03	(Switzerland) PAOK – Grasshoppers	2–1	Chasiotis 3', Yiasoumi 48' – Núñez 65' (pen.)
2002–03	(Switzerland) Grasshoppers – PAOK	1–1	Tararache 45'+2' – Markos 90'+3'
2002–03	(Czech Republic) PAOK – Slavia Prague	1–0	Georgiadis 52'
2002–03	(Czech Republic) Slavia Prague – PAOK	4–0	Skácel 13', Vachoušek 51', Kuka 89', 90'+3'
2003–04	(Norway) PAOK – Lyn Oslo	0–1	Sigurðsson 39'
2003–04	(Norway) Lyn Oslo – PAOK	0–3	Yiasoumi 52', Koutsis 56', Vokolos 59'
2003–04	(Hungary) PAOK – Debreceni	1–1	Karadimos 17' – Bajzát 25'
2003–04	(Hungary) Debreceni – PAOK	0–0	—
2004–05	(Israel) PAOK – Maccabi Tel Aviv	0–3 (w/o)	(Yiasoumi 50' – Addo 13', Mesika 43')
2004–05	(Israel) Maccabi Tel Aviv – PΑΟΚ	1–0	Cohen 8'
2004–05	(Netherlands) PAOK – AZ	2–3	Salpingidis 26', Vokolos 31' – Van Galen 18', Landzaat 36', Meerdink 50'
2004–05	(Netherlands) AZ – PAOK	2–1	Vokolos 11' (o.g.), Mathijsen 72' – Salpingidis 8'
2005–06	(Ukraine) PAOK – Metalurh Donetsk	1–1	Salpingidis 25' – Shyshchenko 67'
2005–06	(Ukraine) Metalurh Donetsk – PAOK	2–2	Kosyrin 39', Shyshchenko 58' – Salpingidis 42', Konstantinidis 45'
2005–06	(Ukraine) Shakhtar Donetsk – PΑΟΚ	1–0	Brandão 68' (pen.)
2005–06	(Germany) PAOK – Stuttgart	1–2	Karipidis 48' – Ljuboja 85', 90'+1' (pen.)
2005–06	(Romania) Rapid București – PΑΟΚ	1–0	Măldărășanu 45'+2'
2005–06	(France) PAOK – Rennes	5–1	Rochat 3' (o.g.), Christodoulopoulos 38', Yiasoumi 79', 89', Salpingidis 83' (pen.) – Briand 70'
2009–10	(Norway) Vålerenga – PΑΟΚ	1–2	Storbæk 42' – Lino 31', Muslimović 37'
2009–10	(Norway) PAOK – Vålerenga	0–1	Berre 59'
2009–10	(Netherlands) PAOK – Heerenveen	1–1	Ivić 54' – Henrique 45'+1'
2009–10	(Netherlands) Heerenveen – PAOK	0–0	—
2010–11	(Netherlands) Ajax – PAOK	1–1	Suárez 13' – Ivić 72'
2010–11	(Netherlands) PAOK – Ajax	3–3	Vieirinha 16', Salpingidis 56', Ivić 90'+1' – Suárez 48', De Jong 50', Lindgren 55'
2010–11	(Turkey) PAOK – Fenerbahçe	1–0	Vieirinha 19'
2010–11	(Turkey) Fenerbahçe – PAOK	1–1 (a.e.t.)	Emre 51' – Muslimović 102'
2010–11	(Belgium) Club Brugge – PAOK	1–1	Kouemaha 61' – Malezas 78'
2010–11	(Croatia) PAOK – Dinamo Zagreb	1–0	Ivić 56'
2010–11	(Spain) Villarreal – PΑΟΚ	1–0	Ruben 38'
2010–11	(Spain) PAOK – Villarreal	1–0	Vieirinha 70'
2010–11	(Belgium) PAOK – Club Brugge	1–1	Vieirinha 25' – Šćepović 89'
2010–11	(Croatia) Dinamo Zagreb – PΑΟΚ	0–1	Salpingidis 60'
2010–11	(Russia) PAOK – CSKA Moscow	0–1	Necid 29'
2010–11	(Russia) CSKA Moscow – PAOK	1–1	Ignashevich 80' – Muslimović 67'
2011–12	(Norway) Vålerenga – PΑΟΚ	0–2	Vieirinha 72', García 90'
2011–12	(Norway) PAOK – Vålerenga	3–0	Vieirinha 44', Athanasiadis 49', Fotakis 58'
2011–12	(Ukraine) PAOK – Karpaty Lviv	2–0	Athanasiadis 15', Lino 56'
2011–12	(Ukraine) Karpaty Lviv – PAOK	1–1	Lucas 45' (pen.) – Balafas 55'
2011–12	(England) PAOK – Tottenham Hotspur	0–0	—
2011–12	(Russia) Rubin Kazan – PAOK	2–2	Natcho 52', Dyadyun 66' – Athanasiadis 23', Fotakis 81'
2011–12	(Republic of Ireland) PAOK – Shamrock Rovers	2–1	Lazăr 12', Vieirinha 63' – Sheppard 48'
2011–12	(Republic of Ireland) Shamrock Rovers – PAOK	1–3	Dennehy 51' – Salpingidis 7', 38', Fotakis 35'
2011–12	(England) Tottenham Hotspur – PAOK	1–2	Modrić 38' (pen.) – Salpingidis 6', Athanasiadis 13'
2011–12	(Russia) PAOK – Rubin Kazan	1–1	Vieirinha 15' (pen.) – Valdez 48'
2011–12	(Italy) Udinese – PAOK	0–0	—
2011–12	(Italy) PAOK – Udinese	0–3	Danilo 6', Flores 15', Domizzi 51' (pen.)
2012–13	(Israel) Bnei Yehuda – PAOK	0–2	Georgiadis 62', Athanasiadis 72'
2012–13	(Israel) PAOK – Bnei Yehuda	4–1	Athanasiadis 48', 52', Robert 79', Pelkas 90'+1' – Marinković 7'
2012–13	(Austria) PAOK – Rapid Wien	2–1	Athanasiadis 69', Katsikas 83' – Alar 25'
2012–13	(Austria) Rapid Wien – PAOK	3–0	Alar 31', Boyd 48', Hofmann 90'+3'
2013–14	(Ukraine) PAOK – Metalist Kharkiv	0–2	Dević 43' (pen.), 72'
2013–14	(Ukraine) Metalist Kharkiv – PAOK	1–1	Blanco 72' – Necid 83'
2013–14	(Germany) Schalke 04 – PAOK	1–1	Farfán 32' – Stoch 73'
2013–14	(Germany) PAOK – Schalke 04	2–3	Athanasiadis 53', Katsouranis 79' – Szalai 43', 90', Draxler 67'
2013–14	PAOK – Shakhter	2–1	Athanasiadis 75', Vukić 90'+1' – Cañas 50' (pen.)
2013–14	(Netherlands) AZ – PAOK	1–1	Gouweleeuw 82' – Salpingidis 90'+3'
2013–14	(Israel) PAOK – Maccabi Haifa	3–2	Vítor 35', Ninis 39', Salpingidis 66' – Ndlovu 13', Golasa 21'
2013–14	(Israel) Maccabi Haifa – PAOK	0–0	—
2013–14	Shakhter – PAOK	0–2	Đidić 54' (o.g.), Kitsiou 90'+2'
2013–14	(Netherlands) PAOK – AZ	2–2	Lucas 37' (pen.), Pozoglou 90'+4' – Lam 31', Gorter 71' (pen.)
2013–14	(Portugal) PAOK – Benfica	0–1	Lima 59'
2013–14	(Portugal) Benfica – PAOK	3–0	Gaitán 70', Lima 78' (pen.), Marković 79'
2014–15	Zimbru Chișinău – PAOK	1–0	Burghiu 79'
2014–15	PAOK – Zimbru Chișinău	4–0	Pereyra 11', Athanasiadis 45', Mak 79', Martens 84'
2014–15	PAOK – Dinamo Minsk	6–1	Nikolić 3' (o.g.), Athanasiadis 11', 16', 28', Papadopoulos 50', Tzandaris 90' – Nikolić 80'
2014–15	(France) Guingamp – PAOK	2–0	Marveaux 47', 50'
2014–15	(Italy) PAOK – Fiorentina	0–1	Vargas 38'
2014–15	(Italy) Fiorentina – PAOK	1–1	Pasqual 88' – Martens 81'
2014–15	Dinamo Minsk – PAOK	0–2	Athanasiadis 82', 88'
2014–15	(France) PAOK – Guingamp	1–2	Athanasiadis 22' (pen.) – Beauvue 7', 83'
2015–16	(Croatia) Lokomotiva – PΑΟΚ	2–1	Kolar 30', Andrijašević 45'+1' – Mak 90'+1'
2015–16	(Croatia) PAOK – Lokomotiva	6–0	Lucas 3', Mak 7', 84', Pelkas 14', Kitsiou 34', Andrijašević 59' (o.g.)
2015–16	(Slovakia) PAOK – Spartak Trnava	1–0	Lucas 82'
2015–16	(Slovakia) Spartak Trnava – PAOK	1–1	Sabo 35' (pen.) – Konstantinidis 48'
2015–16	PAOK – Brøndby	5–0	Mak 17', 80', 82', Pelkas 36', Rodrigues 51'
2015–16	Brøndby – PAOK	1–1	Rashani 27' – Costa 21'
2015–16	Gabala – PAOK	0–0	—
2015–16	(Germany) PAOK – Borussia Dortmund	1–1	Mak 34' – Castro 72'
2015–16	(Russia) PAOK – Krasnodar	0–0	—
2015–16	(Russia) Krasnodar – PAOK	2–1	Ari 33', Joãozinho 67' (pen.) – Mak 90'+1'
2015–16	PAOK – Gabala	0–0	—
2015–16	(Germany) Borussia Dortmund – PAOK	0–1	Mak 33'
2016–17	(Netherlands) Ajax – PAOK	1–1	Dolberg 58' – Djalma 27'
2016–17	(Netherlands) PAOK – Ajax	1–2	Athanasiadis 4' – Klaassen 45'+1' (pen.), 88'
2016–17	(Georgia (country)) Dinamo Tbilisi – PAOK	0–3	Matos 20', Crespo 71', Pereyra 83'
2016–17	(Georgia (country)) PAOK – Dinamo Tbilisi	2–0	Rodrigues 5', Tzavellas 45'
2016–17	(Italy) PAOK – Fiorentina	0–0	—
2016–17	(Czech Republic) Slovan Liberec – PAOK	1–2	Komlichenko 1' – Athanasiadis 10' (pen.), 82'
2016–17	Qarabağ – PAOK	2–0	Quintana 56', Amirguliyev 87'
2016–17	PAOK – Qarabağ	0–1	Míchel 69'
2016–17	(Italy) Fiorentina – PAOK	2–3	Bernardeschi 33', Babacar 50' – Shakhov 5', Djalma 26', Rodrigues 90'+3'
2016–17	(Czech Republic) PAOK – Slovan Liberec	2–0	Rodrigues 29', Pelkas 67'
2016–17	(Germany) PAOK – Schalke 04	0–3	Burgstaller 27', Meyer 82', Huntelaar 90'
2016–17	(Germany) Schalke 04 – PAOK	1–1	Schöpf 23' – Nastasić 25' (o.g.)
2017–18	(Ukraine) Olimpik Donetsk – PAOK	1–1	Bilenkyi 49' – Henrique 59'
2017–18	(Ukraine) PAOK – Olimpik Donetsk	2–0	Mak 24', Cimirot 45'+1'
2017–18	(Sweden) PAOK – Östersund	3–1	Matos 38', Prijović 77', 88' (pen.) – Nouri 21' (pen.)
2017–18	(Sweden) Östersund – PAOK	2–0	Ghoddos 71', 77'
2018–19	(Switzerland) PAOK – Basel	2–1	Cañas 32', Prijović 80' – Ajeti 81'
2018–19	(Switzerland) Basel – PAOK	0–3	Varela 7', Prijović 52', El Kaddouri 60'
2018–19	(Russia) PAOK – Spartak Moscow	3–2	Prijović 29' (pen.), Limnios 37', Pelkas 44' – Popov 7', Promes 17'
2018–19	(Russia) Spartak Moscow – PAOK	0–0	—
2018–19	(Portugal) Benfica – PAOK	1–1	Pizzi 45'+1' (pen.) – Warda 76'
2018–19	(Portugal) PAOK – Benfica	1–4	Prijović 13' – Jardel 20', Salvio 26' (pen.) 49' (pen.), Pizzi 39'
2018–19	(England) PAOK – Chelsea	0–1	Willian 7'
2018–19	(Belarus) BATE Borisov – PAOK	1–4	Crespo 61' (o.g.) – Prijović 6', Jabá 11', 17', Pelkas 73'
2018–19	(Hungary) PAOK – MOL Vidi	0–2	Huszti 12', Stopira 45'
2018–19	(Hungary) MOL Vidi – PAOK	1–0	Milanov 50'
2018–19	(England) Chelsea – PAOK	4–0	Giroud 27', 37', Hudson-Odoi 60', Morata 78'
2018–19	(Belarus) PAOK – BATE Borisov	1–3	Prijović 59' – Skavysh 18', Signevich 42', 45+1' (pen.)
2019–20	(Netherlands) PAOK – Ajax	2–2	Akpom 32', Matos 39' – Ziyech 10', Huntelaar 57'
2019–20	(Netherlands) Ajax – PAOK	3–2	Tadić 43' (pen.), 85' (pen.), Tagliafico 79' – Biseswar 23', 90+4'
2019–20	(Slovakia) Slovan Bratislava – PAOK	1–0	Abena 90'+4'
2019–20	(Slovakia) PAOK – Slovan Bratislava	3–2	Limnios 49', Świderski 50', Giannoulis 87'– Medveděv, 38' De Marco 61'
2020–21	(Turkey) PAOK – Beşiktaş	3–1	Tzolis 7', 24', Pelkas 30' – Larin 37'
2020–21	(Portugal) PAOK – Benfica	2–1	Giannoulis 63', A. Živković 75' – Rafa Silva 90'+4'
2020–21	(Russia) Krasnodar – PAOK	2–1	Claesson 39' (pen.), Cabella 70' – Pelkas 32'
2020–21	(Russia) PAOK – Krasnodar	1–2	El Kaddouri 77' – Michailidis 73' (o.g.), Cabella 77'
2020–21	(Cyprus) PAOK – Omonia	1–1	Murg 56' – Bauthéac 16'
2020–21	(Spain) Granada – PAOK	0–0	—
2020–21	(Netherlands) PAOK – PSV	4–1	Schwab 47', A. Živković 56', 67', Tzolis 58' – Zahavi 21' (pen.)
2020–21	(Netherlands) PSV – PAOK	3–2	Gakpo 20', Madueke 51', Malen 53' – Varela 4', Tzolis 13'
2020–21	(Cyprus) Omonia – PAOK	2–1	Kakoullis 9', Gómez 84' (pen.) – Tzolis 39'
2020–21	(Spain) PAOK – Granada	0–0	—
2021–22	(Republic of Ireland) Bohemians – PAOK	2–1	Coote 23', 52' – Oliveira 78'
2021–22	(Republic of Ireland) PAOK – Bohemians	2–0	Schwab 4', Biseswar 28'
2021–22	(Croatia) PAOK – Rijeka	1–1	Galešić (o.g.) 90+4’ – Lepinjica 33’
2021–22	(Croatia) Rijeka – PAOK	0–2	El Kaddouri 10', Murg 80'
2021–22	(Gibraltar) Lincoln Red Imps – PAOK	0–2	Akpom 45+2’, Mitriță 56’
2021–22	(Slovakia) PAOK – Slovan Bratislava	1–1	Akpom 9’ – Green 14’
2021–22	(Denmark) Copenhagen – PAOK	1–2	Pep Biel 80' – Sidcley 19', A. Živković 38'
2021–22	(Denmark) PAOK – Copenhagen	1–2	A. Živković 8' – Ankersen 34’, Pep Biel 50'
2021–22	(Slovakia) Slovan Bratislava – PAOK	0–0	—
2021–22	(Gibraltar) PAOK – Lincoln Red Imps	2–0	A. Živković 17', Schwab 55'
2021–22	(Denmark) Midtjylland – PAOK	1–0	Andersson 20'
2021–22	(Denmark) PAOK – Midtjylland	2–1 (5–3 p.)	A. Živković 20', Vieirinha 26' – Høegh 80'
2021–22	(Belgium) PAOK – Gent	1–0	Kurtić 58'
2021–22	(Belgium) Gent – PAOK	1–2	Depoitre 40' – Crespo 20', Douglas Augusto 77'
2021–22	(France) Marseille – PAOK	2–1	Gerson 13', Payet 45' – El Kaddouri 48'
2021–22	(France) PAOK – Marseille	0–1	Payet 34'
2022–23	(Bulgaria) Levski Sofia – PAOK	2–0	Welton 1', Bari 19'
2022–23	(Bulgaria) PAOK – Levski Sofia	1–1	Dantas 56' – Ronaldo 25'
2023–24	(Israel) PAOK – Beitar Jerusalem	0–0	—
2023–24	(Israel) Beitar Jerusalem – PAOK	1–4	Friday 45+7' – Gotlieb 12' (o.g.), Brandon 45+1', Thomas 90+2' (o.g.), Konstantelias 90+6'
2023–24	(Croatia) Hajduk Split – PAOK	0–0	—
2023–24	(Croatia) PAOK – Hajduk Split	3–0	Schwab 12' (pen.), A. Živković 79', 85'
2023–24	(Scotland) Heart of Midlothian – PAOK	1–2	Shankland 9' (pen.) – Schwab 12' (pen.), A. Živković 75'
2023–24	(Scotland) PAOK – Heart of Midlothian	4–0	Taison 16', 71', Brandon 23', Konstantelias 57'
2023–24	(Finland) HJK – PAOK	2–3	Bandé 35', Radulović 90+9' (pen.) – Koulierakis 55', Despodov 81', Brandon 90+4'
2023–24	(Germany) PAOK – Eintracht Frankfurt	2–1	A. Živković 28', Koulierakis 90+2' – Marmoush 68'
2023–24	(Scotland) Aberdeen – PAOK	2–3	Miovski 50', Polvara 58' – Despodov 73', Vieirinha 84', Schwab 90+6' (pen.)
2023–24	(Scotland) PAOK – Aberdeen	2–2	Taison 23', Samatta 67' – Duk 14', McGrath 70'
2023–24	(Germany) Eintracht Frankfurt – PAOK	1–2	Marmoush 58' – Kędziora 55', A. Živković 73'
2023–24	(Finland) PAOK – HJK	4–2	Ozdoyev 37', Konstantelias 47', Toivio 53' (o.g.), Murg 85' – Radulović 6', Hetemaj 90+2' (pen.)
2023–24	(Croatia) Dinamo Zagreb – PAOK	2–0	Petković 37', 71'
2023–24	(Croatia) PAOK – Dinamo Zagreb	5–1	Baba 27', Sučić 33' (o.g.), Brandon 42', Koulierakis 72', A. Živković 88' (pen.) – Hoxha 49'
2023–24	(Belgium) Club Brugge – PAOK	1–0	Vetlesen 6'
2023–24	(Belgium) PAOK – Club Brugge	0–2	Jutglà 33', 45'
2024–25	(Bosnia and Herzegovina) PAOK – Borac Banja Luka	3–2	Koulierakis 17', 39', Troost-Ekong 51' – Herrera 22'(pen.) – Kulašin 45+3'
2024–25	(Bosnia and Herzegovina) Borac Banja Luka – PAOK	0–1	Murg 25'
2024–25	(Sweden) Malmö FF – PAOK	2–2	Jansson 28', Nanasi 67' – Taison 42', Baba 75'
2024–25	(Sweden) PAOK – Malmö FF	3–4 (a.e.t.)	Taison 21', Koulierakis 43', A. Živković 45+3' – Nanasi 10', 45', Zätterström 90+6', Christiansen 99'
2024–25	(Republic of Ireland) PAOK – Shamrock Rovers	4–0	Cleary 45' (o.g.), Taison 47', Konstantelias 67', Baba 90+5'
2024–25	(Republic of Ireland) Shamrock Rovers -PAOK	0–2	Ozdoyev 64', Despodov 75'
2024–25	(Turkey) Galatasaray – PAOK	3–1	Baba 48' (o.g.), Akgün 75', Icardi 90+5' – Konstantelias 67'
2024–25	(Romania) PAOK – FCSB	0–1	Bîrligea 45+8'
2024–25	(Czech Republic) PAOK – Viktoria Plzeň	2–2	Tissoudali 84', Baba 90+3' – Havel 31', Vydra 39'
2024–25	(England) Manchester United – PAOK	2–0	Amad 50', 77'
2024–25	(Latvia) RFS – PAOK	0–2	Despodov 2', Chalov 59'
2024–25	(Hungary) PAOK – Ferencváros	5–0	Taison 10', Brandon 29', Chalov 76', A. Živković 80' (pen.), Despodov 89'
2024–25	(Czech Republic) PAOK – Slavia	2–0	Schwab 26' (pen.), Konstantelias 56'
2024–25	(Spain) Real Sociedad – PAOK	2–0	Óskarsson 43', 48'
2024–25	(Romania) PAOK – FCSB	1–2	Samatta 21' – Gheorghiță 50', Dawa 60'
2024–25	(Romania) FCSB – PAOK	2–0	Cisotti 30', Miculescu 81'
2025–26	(Austria) PAOK – Wolfsberger AC	0–0	—
2025–26	(Austria) Wolfsberger AC – PAOK	0–1 (a.e.t.)	Camara 115'
2025–26	(Croatia) Rijeka – PAOK	1–0	Menalo 39'
2025–26	(Croatia) PAOK – Rijeka	5–0	Meïté 12', Konstantelias 25', Chalov 56', Giakoumakis 77', Pelkas 89'
2025–26	(Israel) PAOK – Maccabi Tel Aviv	0–0	—
2025–26	(Spain) Celta Vigo – PAOK	3–1	Aspas 45+2', Iglesias 53', Swedberg 70' – Giakoumakis 37'
2025–26	(France) Lille – PAOK	3–4	André 57', Igamane 68', 78' – Meïté 18', A. Živković 23', 74', Konstantelias 42'
2025–26	(Switzerland) PAOK – Young Boys	4–0	Bianco 54', Giakoumakis 67', Konstantelias 72', Baba 76'
2025–26	(Norway) PAOK – Brann	1–1	Ivanušec 64' – Kornvig 89'
2025–26	(Bulgaria) Ludogorets Razgrad – PAOK	3–3	Stanić 33', Verdon 70', Chochev 77' – Despodov 39', Vogliacco 48', Mythou 90'
2025–26	(Spain) PAOK – Real Betis	2–0	A. Živković 67', Giakoumakis 86' (pen.)
2025–26	(France) Lyon – PAOK	4-2	Himbert 34', Merah 55', Karabec 88', Rodríguez 90+3' – Giakoumakis 20', Meïté 66'
2025–26	(Spain) PAOK – Celta Vigo	1–2	Jeremejeff 77' – Aspas 34', Swedberg 43'
2025–26	(Spain) Celta Vigo – PAOK	1–0	Swedberg 63'
2026–27	(Ukraine) Dynamo Kyiv – PAOK	2–3	Brazhko 3', Lonwijk 77' – Konstantelias 13', Zafeiris 38', Santamaria 51'
2026–27	(Ukraine) PAOK – Dynamo Kyiv	2–0	Konstantelias 45+1', 48'
2026–27	(Belgium) PAOK – Anderlecht	0–1	Cvetković 1'
2026–27	(Belgium) Anderlecht – PAOK	3–2	Pétrot 20', Ambros 47', Sikan 55' – Živković 34', Jeremejeff 88' (pen.)
2026–27	(Norway) PAOK – Brann	1–0	Baba 80' – Eriksen 57'
2026–27	(Norway) Brann – PAOK	3–2	Holm 45+3', Ingason 56', Castro 86' (pen.) – Ndiaye 63', Zafeiris 68'

== Opponents per country and per season ==
Country	Club	Seasons
Austria	Wiener Sport-Club	1965–66
Austria	Rapid Wien	1972–73, 2012–13
Austria	Swarovski Tirol	1991–92
Austria	Kärnten	2001–02
Austria	Wolfsberger AC	2025–26
Azerbaijan	Gabala	2015–16
Azerbaijan	Qarabağ	2016–17
Belarus
Belarus	Dinamo Minsk	2014–15
Belarus	BATE Borisov	2018–19
Belgium
Belgium	RFC Liège	1967–68
Belgium	KV Mechelen	1991–92
Belgium	Club Brugge	2010–11, 2023–24
Belgium	Gent	2021–22
Belgium	Anderlecht	2026–27
Bosnia and Herzegovina
Bosnia and Herzegovina	Borac Banja Luka	2024–25
Bulgaria
Bulgaria	Lokomotiv Plovdiv	1983–84
Bulgaria	Levski Sofia	2022–23
Bulgaria	Ludogorets Razgrad	2025–26
Croatia
Croatia	Dinamo Zagreb	2010–11, 2023–24
Croatia	Lokomotiva Zagreb	2015–16
Croatia	Rijeka	2021–22, 2025–26
Croatia	Hajduk Split	2023–24
Cyprus
Cyprus	Omonia	1976–77, 2020–21
Czech Republic
Czech Republic	Příbram	2001–02
Czech Republic	Slavia Prague	2002–03, 2024–25
Czech Republic	Slovan Liberec	2016–17
Czech Republic	Viktoria Plzeň	2024–25
Denmark
Denmark	Vejle	1977–78
Denmark	Brøndby	2015–16
Denmark	Copenhagen	2021–22
Denmark	Midtjylland	2021–22
England
England	Arsenal	1997–98
England	Tottenham Hotspur	2011–12
England	Chelsea	2018–19
England	Manchester United	2024–25
Finland
Finland	HJK	2023–24
France
France	Lyon	1973–74, 2025–26
France	Sochaux	1982–83
France	Paris Saint-Germain	1992–93
France	Rennes	2005–06
France	Guingamp	2014–15
France	Marseille	2021–22
France	Lille	2025–26
Georgia
Georgia	Locomotive Tbilisi	1999–2000
Georgia	Dinamo Tbilisi	2016–17
Germany
Germany	Eintracht Frankfurt	1981–82, 2023–24
Germany	Bayern Munich	1983–84
Germany	VfB Stuttgart	2005–06
Germany	Schalke 04	2013–14, 2016–17
Germany	Borussia Dortmund	2015–16
Gibraltar
Gibraltar	Lincoln Red Imps	2021–22
Hungary
Hungary	Debrecen	2003–04
Hungary	Fehérvár	2018–19
Hungary	Ferencváros	2024–25
Ireland
Ireland	Shamrock Rovers	2011–12, 2024-2025
Ireland	Bohemians	2021–22
Israel
Israel	Beitar Jerusalem	2000–01, 2023–24
Israel	Maccabi Tel Aviv	2004–05, 2025–26
Israel	Bnei Yehuda	2012–13
Israel	Maccabi Haifa	2013–14
Italy
Italy	Milan	1973–74
Italy	Hellas Verona	1985–86
Italy	Napoli	1988–89
Italy	Udinese	2000–01, 2011–12
Italy	Fiorentina	2014–15, 2016–17
Kazakhstan
Kazakhstan	Shakhter Karagandy	2013–14
Latvia
Latvia	RFS	2024–25
Moldova
Moldova	Zimbru Chișinău	2014–15
Netherlands
Netherlands	PSV Eindhoven	2000–01, 2001–02, 2020–21
Netherlands	AZ	2004–05, 2013–14
Netherlands	Heerenveen	2009–10
Netherlands	Ajax	2010–11, 2016–17, 2019–20
Norway
Norway	Lyn Oslo	2003–04
Norway	Vålerenga	2009–10, 2011–12
Norway	Brann	2025–26, 2026–27
Poland
Poland	Legia Warsaw	1973–74
Poland	Zagłębie Sosnowiec	1977–78
Portugal
Portugal	Benfica	1999–2000, 2013–14, 2018–19, 2020–21
Portugal	Leixões	2002–03
Romania
Romania	Dinamo București	1970–71
Romania	Rapid București	2005–06
Romania	FCSB	2024–25
Russia
Russia	CSKA Moscow	2010–11
Russia	Rubin Kazan	2011–12
Russia	Krasnodar	2015–16, 2020–21
Russia	Spartak Moscow	2018–19
Scotland
Scotland	Rangers	1998–99
Scotland	Heart of Midlothian	2023–24
Scotland	Aberdeen	2023–24
Slovakia
Slovakia	Spartak Trnava	1997–98, 2015–16
Slovakia	Slovan Bratislava	2019–20, 2021–22
Spain
Spain	Barcelona	1975–76
Spain	Sevilla	1982–83, 1990–91
Spain	Atlético Madrid	1997–98
Spain	Villarreal	2010–11
Spain	Granada	2020–21
Spain	Real Sociedad	2024–25
Spain	Celta Vigo	2025–26
Spain	Real Betis	2025–26
Soviet Union
Soviet Union	Dynamo Kyiv	1976–77
Sweden
Sweden	Östersund	2017–18
Sweden	Malmö FF	2024–25
Switzerland
Switzerland	Servette	1978–79
Switzerland	Grasshoppers	2002–03
Switzerland	Basel	2018–19
Switzerland	Young Boys	2025–26
Turkey
Turkey	Fenerbahçe	2010–11
Turkey	Beşiktaş	2020–21
Turkey	Galatasaray	2024–25
Ukraine
Ukraine	Metalurh Donetsk	2005–06
Ukraine	Shakhtar Donetsk	2005–06
Ukraine	Karpaty Lviv	2011–12
Ukraine	Metalist Kharkiv	2013–14
Ukraine	Olimpik Donetsk	2017–18
Ukraine	Dynamo Kyiv	2026–27
Yugoslavia
Yugoslavia	Red Star Belgrade	1974–75

Last update: 13 August 2026

== Team statistics ==
=== By competition ===
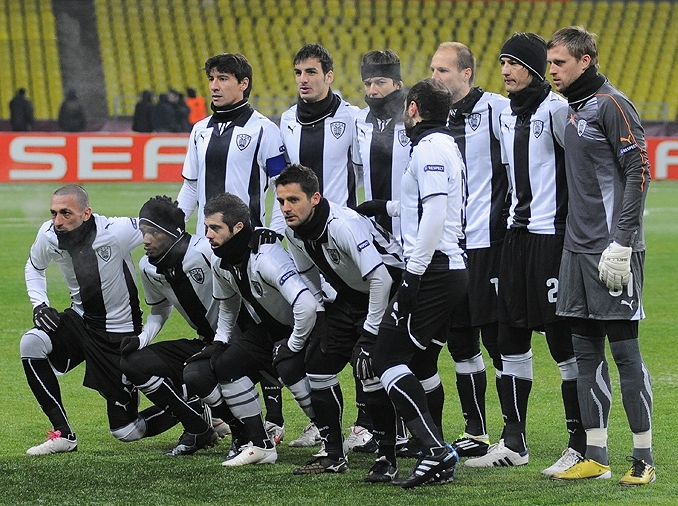
PAOK in 2010–11 Europa League round of 32 match against CSKA Moscow at Luzhniki Stadium.

Competition	App	Pld	W	D	L	Goals
European Cup / Champions League	10	32	8	10	14	45–57
UEFA Cup / Europa League	31	178	68	49	61	254–209
UEFA Conference League	4	36	18	8	10	58–38
UEFA Cup Winners' Cup	6	18	8	5	5	24–23
Inter-Cities Fairs Cup	3	6	2	0	4	5–17
Total	54	270	104	72	94	386–344

Last updated: 27 August 2026

- Biggest home win: 2015–16 Europa League, 23 July 2015, PAOK 6–0 (Croatia) Lokomotiva Zagreb
- Biggest away win: 1999–00 UEFA Cup, 16 September 1999, (Georgia (country)) Locomotive Tbilisi 0–7 PAOK
- Biggest home defeat: 2018–19 UEFA Champions League, 29 August 2018, PAOK 1–4 (Portugal) Benfica
- Biggest away defeat: 1965–66 Inter-Cities Fairs Cup, 29 September 1965, (Austria) Wiener Sport-Club 6–0 PAOK
- Highest scoring games: 1997–98 UEFA Cup, 12 August 1997, PAOK 5–3 (Slovakia) Spartak Trnava &
  1997–98 UEFA Cup, 4 November 1997, PAOK 4–4 (Spain) Atlético Madrid

=== By country ===
Country	Pld	W	D	L	GF	GA	GD	Win%	Note
Austria	12	4	4	4	11	17	−6	33.33	
Azerbaijan	4	0	2	2	0	3	−3	0.00	
Belarus	4	3	0	1	13	5	+8	75.00	
Belgium	12	3	3	6	11	16	−5	25.00	
Bosnia and Herzegovina	2	2	0	0	4	2	+2	100.00	
Bulgaria	5	2	2	1	9	8	+1	40.00	
Croatia	12	7	2	3	25	7	+18	58.33	
Cyprus	4	1	2	1	5	4	+1	25.00	
Czech Republic	8	5	2	1	17	10	+7	62.50	
Denmark	8	4	1	3	13	10	+3	50.00	
England	7	2	2	3	4	9	−5	28.57	
Finland	2	2	0	0	7	4	+3	100.00	
France	13	4	1	8	22	25	−3	30.77	
(Georgia (country)) Georgia	4	4	0	0	14	0	+14	100.00	
Germany	13	4	5	4	13	15	−2	30.77	
Gibraltar	2	2	0	0	4	0	+4	100.00	
Hungary	5	1	2	2	6	4	+2	20.00	
Ireland	6	5	0	1	14	4	+10	83.33	
Israel	11	5	4	2	19	12	+7	45.45	
Italy	14	2	5	7	12	20	−8	14.29	
Kazakhstan	2	2	0	0	4	1	+3	100.00	
Latvia	1	1	0	0	2	0	+2	100.00	
Moldova	2	1	0	1	4	1	+3	50.00	
Netherlands	18	2	8	8	27	35	−8	11.11	
Norway	9	4	2	3	14	8	+6	44.44	
Poland	4	3	1	0	6	1	+5	75.00	
Portugal	9	3	1	5	12	16	−4	33.33	
Romania	6	1	0	5	2	11	−9	16.67	
Russia	10	1	5	4	10	13	−3	10.00	
Scotland	6	3	2	1	11	7	+4	50.00	
Slovakia	8	4	3	1	12	8	+4	50.00	
Soviet Union	2	0	0	2	0	6	−6	0.00	
Spain	17	4	5	8	15	28	−13	23.53	
Sweden	4	1	1	2	8	9	−1	25.00	
Switzerland	7	5	1	1	14	7	+7	71.43	
Turkey	4	2	1	1	6	5	+1	50.00	
Ukraine	11	4	5	2	15	11	+4	36.36	
Yugoslavia	2	1	0	1	1	2	−1	50.00	
Total	270	104	72	94	386	344	+42	38,52	

Last updated: 27 August 2026
Source: Statistics at UEFA.com

== Player and managerial statistics ==
Most appearances
Player	Apps
(Serbia) **Andrija Živković**	70
(Greece) Dimitris Salpingidis	60
(Portugal) Vieirinha	56
(Austria) Stefan Schwab	55
(Greece) Stefanos Athanasiadis	53
(Spain) José Ángel Crespo	50
(Greece) Giannis Konstantelias	49
(Greece) **Dimitrios Pelkas**	49
(Ghana) **Baba**	49
(Brazil) **Taison**	46
(Cape Verde) Fernando Varela	45
(Netherlands) (Suriname) Diego Biseswar	41
(Russia) Magomed Ozdoyev	41
(Poland) Tomasz Kędziora	40
(Greece) **Giannis Michailidis**	40
(Austria) Thomas Murg	35
(Bulgaria) **Kiril Despodov**	35
(Brazil) Lino	34
(Croatia) Dominik Kotarski	34
(Greece) Giorgos Koudas	33
(Greece) Panagiotis Glykos	33
(Morocco) Omar El Kaddouri	33
(Greece) Alexandros Paschalakis	33
(Guinea) **Mady Camara**	31
(Brazil) Leo Matos	30

Top scorers
Player	Goals
(Greece) Stefanos Athanasiadis	20
(Serbia) **Andrija Živković**	19
(Greece) Dimitris Salpingidis	14
(Greece) Giannis Konstantelias	12
(Slovakia) Róbert Mak	11
(Portugal) Vieirinha	10
(Cyprus) Yiasoumis Yiasoumi	9
(Greece) **Dimitrios Pelkas**	9
(Serbia) Aleksandar Prijović	8
(Greece) Stavros Sarafis	7
(Brazil) **Taison**	7
(Austria) Stefan Schwab	7
(Greece) Kostas Frantzeskos	6
(Greece) Konstantinos Koulierakis	6
(Bulgaria) **Kiril Despodov**	6
(Ghana) **Baba**	6
(Greece) Christos Dimopoulos	5
(Greece) Spyros Marangos	5
(Greece) Pantelis Konstantinidis	5
(Greece) Christos Tzolis	5
(Spain) Brandon Thomas	5
(Greece) Giorgos Giakoumakis	5

Managers
Manager	Apps
(Romania) Răzvan Lucescu	78
(Greece) Angelos Anastasiadis	27
(Bosnia and Herzegovina) Dušan Bajević	12
(Romania) László Bölöni	12
(Netherlands) Huub Stevens	12
(Croatia) Igor Tudor	12
(Serbia) Vladimir Ivić	12
(England) Les Shannon	10
(Portugal) Abel Ferreira	10
(Germany) Heinz Höher	6
(Greece) Pavlos Dermitzakis	6
(Greece) Makis Chavos	6
(Italy) Alessio Lisci	6

Players and coach in bold are currently active for PAOK.

A minimum of 30 appearances for players is required to be on the list.

A minimum of 5 goals is required to be on the list.

A minimum of 6 appearances for coaches is required to be on the list.

Last updated: 27 August 2026

=== Players who scored for and against PAOK ===
Player	Goals for PAOK			Goals against PAOK		
(Czech Republic) Tomáš Necid	2013–14 Champions League	Metalist Kharkiv – PAOK 1–1	83' 1–1	2010–11 Europa League	PAOK – CSKA Moscow 0–1	29' 0–1
(Spain) Lucas Pérez	2013–14 Europa League; 2015–16 Europa League; 2015–16 Europa League	PAOK – AZ 2–2; PAOK – Lokomotiva 6–0; PAOK – Spartak Trnava 1–0	37' 1–1 (p.); 3' 1–0; 82' 1–0	2011–12 Europa League	Karpaty Lviv – PAOK 1–1	45' 1–0 (p.)

Note: Andrijašević of Lokomotiva scored also for and against PAOK but that was in the same qualifying round and the second was an own goal (2015–16 Europa League).

=== Youngest goalscorers ===
Player		Age	Date of birth	Date scored	Competition	Opponent	Goal
1.	(Greece) Stelios Pozoglou	17 years, 10 months and 21 days	22–01–1996	12–12–2013	2013–14 Europa League	PAOK – AZ (Netherlands) 2–2	90'+4' 2–2
2.	(Greece) Dimitris Salpingidis	18 years, 1 month and 12 days	18–08–1981	30–09–1999	1999–00 UEFA Cup	PAOK – Locomotive Tbilisi (Georgia (country)) 2–0	88' 2–0
3.	(Greece) Anestis Mythou	18 years, 6 months and 22 days	20–05–2007	11–12–2025	2025–26 Europa League	Ludogorets Razgrad – PAOK (Bulgaria) 3–3	90' 3–3
4.	(Greece) Christos Tzolis	18 years, 6 months and 26 days	30–01–2002	25–08–2020	2020–21 Champions League	PAOK – Beşiktaş (Turkey) 3–1	7' 1–0
5.	(Greece) Dimitrios Pelkas	18 years, 9 months and 14 days	26–10–1993	09–08–2012	2012–13 Europa League	PAOK – Bnei Yehuda (Israel) 4–1	90+1' 4–1

Players in bold are currently active for PAOK

Last updated: 11 December 2025

Source: Statistics in Europe at paokfc.gr

Source: Statistics at

== Match statistics ==
European matches in away goal rule (abolished as of the qualifying phases of the 2021/22 competitions).

1972–73 Cup Winners' Cup	Rapid Wien (Austria)	0–0, 2–2	(Greece) PAOK
1982–83 UEFA Cup	PAOK (Greece)	1–0, 1–2	(France) Sochaux
2003–04 UEFA Cup	PAOK (Greece)	1–1, 0–0	(Hungary) Debreceni
2005–06 UEFA Cup	PAOK (Greece)	1–1, 2–2	(Ukraine) Metalurh Donetsk
2009–10 Europa League	Vålerenga (Norway)	1–2, 1–0	(Greece) PAOK
2009–10 Europa League	PAOK (Greece)	1–1, 0–0	(Netherlands) Heerenveen
2010–11 Champions League	Ajax (Netherlands)	1–1, 3–3	(Greece) PAOK
2017–18 Europa League	PAOK (Greece)	3–1, 0–2	(Sweden) Östersund
2019–20 Europa League	PAOK (Greece)	3–2, 0–1	(Slovakia) Slovan Bratislava

European matches in extra time

1974–75 Cup Winners' Cup	PAOK (Greece)	1–0, 0–2 (a.e.t.)	(Socialist Federal Republic of Yugoslavia) Red Star Belgrade
1982–83 UEFA Cup	PAOK (Greece)	1–0, 1–2 (a.e.t.)	(France) Sochaux
2000–01 UEFA Cup	Udinese (Italy)	1–0, 0–3 (a.e.t.)	(Greece) PAOK
2010–11 Europa League	PAOK (Greece)	1–0, 1–1 (a.e.t.)	(Turkey) Fenerbahçe
2024–25 Champions League	Malmö FF (Sweden)	2–2, 4–3 (a.e.t.)	(Greece) PAOK
2025–26 Europa League	PAOK (Greece)	0–0, 1–0 (a.e.t.)	(Austria) Wolfsberger AC

=== Matches on penalty shoot-out ===
1981–82 European Cup Winners' Cup
1st Round

PAOK (Greece)	0–2, 2–0 (a.e.t.)	(West Germany) Eintracht Frankfurt
Penalties
Kostikos (penalty scored); Guerino (penalty scored); Gounaris (penalty scored); Siggas (penalty scored); Dimopoulos (penalty missed)	4–5	(penalty scored) Lorant; (penalty scored) Körbel; (penalty scored) Trapp; (penalty scored) Nachtweih; (penalty scored) Pezzey

1983–84 UEFA Cup
2nd Round

Bayern Munich (West Germany)	0–0, 0–0 (a.e.t.)	(Greece) PAOK
Penalties
Augenthaler (penalty scored); Hoeneß (penalty missed); Kraus (penalty scored); Nachtweih (penalty scored); Lerby (penalty scored); Del'Haye (penalty scored); Dürnberger (penalty scored); Rummenigge (penalty scored); Pflügler (penalty scored); Pfaff (penalty scored)	9–8	(penalty scored) Kostikos; (penalty scored) Dimopoulos; (penalty scored) Skartados; (penalty scored) Vasilakos; (penalty missed) Damanakis; (penalty scored) Alavantas; (penalty scored) Alexandridis; (penalty scored) Psarras; (penalty scored) Baniotis; (penalty missed) Malioufas

1990–91 UEFA Cup
1st Round

PAOK (Greece)	0–0, 0–0 (a.e.t.)	(Spain) Sevilla
Penalties
Skartados (penalty missed); Karageorgiou (penalty scored); Toursounidis (penalty scored); I. Hassan (penalty scored); Tolba (penalty missed)	3–4	(penalty missed) Bengoechea; (penalty scored) Salguero; (penalty scored) Polster; (penalty scored) Serrano; (penalty scored) Diego

1999–2000 UEFA Cup
2nd Round

Benfica (Portugal)	2–1, 1–2 (a.e.t.)	(Greece) PAOK
Penalties
Ronaldo (penalty scored); Maniche (penalty scored); Chano (penalty scored); Madeira (penalty scored)	4–1	(penalty missed) Frousos; (penalty missed) Macheridis; (penalty scored) Bandović

2021–22 Conference League
Knockout Round PO

PAOK (Greece)	2–1, 0–1 (a.e.t.)	(Denmark) Midtjylland
Penalties
Čolak (penalty scored); Sidcley (penalty scored); Schwab (penalty scored); Mitriță (penalty scored); Kurtić (penalty scored)	5–3	(penalty missed) Meyer; (penalty scored) Andersson; (penalty scored) Dyhr; (penalty scored) Lind

=== Penalties in European matches ===
Competition	Opponent	Score	Penalties for PAOK (36)	Penalties against PAOK (44)	Referee
1972–73 Cup Winners' Cup	(Austria) PAOK – Rapid Wien	2–2	(penalty scored) Sarafis 32'		(Hungary) Palotai
1973–74 Cup Winners' Cup	(France) PAOK – Lyon	4–0	(penalty scored) Aslanidis 38'		(Italy) Gonella
1973–74 Cup Winners' Cup	(Italy) Milan – PAOK	3–0		(penalty missed) Rivera 78'	(Malta) Bonett
1975–76 UEFA Cup	(Spain) Barcelona – PAOK	6–1		(penalty scored) Neeskens 25' (penalty scored) Neeskens 57'	(England) Taylor
1976–77 European Cup	PAOK – Dynamo Kyiv	0–2	(penalty missed) Koudas 41'		(Italy) Gussoni
1977–78 Cup Winners' Cup	(Poland) PAOK – Zagłębie	2–0	(penalty missed) Orfanos 57' (penalty scored) Anastasiadis 79'		(Italy) Michelotti
1982–83 UEFA Cup	(France) Sochaux – PAOK	2–1		(penalty scored) Anziani 90'+1'	(Wales) Bridges
1983–84 UEFA Cup	(Bulgaria) Lokomotiv Plovdiv – PAOK	1–2		(penalty scored) Sadakov 71'	(West Germany) Tritschler
1983–84 UEFA Cup	(Bulgaria) PAOK – Lokomotiv Plovdiv	3–1	(penalty scored) Dimopoulos 76'		(Hungary) Palotai
1988–89 UEFA Cup	(Italy) Napoli – PAOK	1–0		(penalty scored) Maradona 58'	(West Germany) Schmidhuber
1991–92 UEFA Cup	(Austria) Swarovski Tirol – PAOK	2–0	(penalty missed) Borbokis 68'		(Czechoslovakia) Christov
1997–98 UEFA Cup	(Slovakia) PAOK – Spartak Trnava	5–3	(penalty scored) Zagorakis 31'		(Austria) Stuchlik
1997–98 UEFA Cup	(Spain) PAOK – Atlético Madrid	4–4	(penalty scored) Zagorakis 76'		(Scotland) Rowbotham
1999–00 UEFA Cup	(Georgia (country)) PAOK – Locomotive Tbilisi	2–0	(penalty scored) Valencia 52'		(Republic of Ireland) Malcolm
2000–01 UEFA Cup	(Israel) Beitar Jerusalem – PAOK	3–3		(penalty scored) Abukasis 52'	(Hungary) Juhos
2001–02 UEFA Cup	(Netherlands) PSV Eindhoven – PAOK	4–1		(penalty scored) van Bommel 90'+2'	(Italy) Cesari
2002–03 UEFA Cup	(Switzerland) PAOK – Grasshoppers	2–1		(penalty scored) Núñez 65'	(Belgium) Huyghe
2003–04 UEFA Cup	(Hungary) PAOK – Debreceni	1–1		(penalty missed) Éger 25'	(Croatia) Trivković
2005–06 UEFA Cup	(Ukraine) Shakhtar Donetsk – PΑΟΚ	1–0		(penalty scored) Brandão 68'	(Republic of Ireland) Kelly
2005–06 UEFA Cup	(Germany) PAOK – Stuttgart	1–2		(penalty scored) Ljuboja 90'+1'	(Spain) Dávila
2005–06 UEFA Cup	(France) PAOK – Rennes	5–1	(penalty scored) Salpingidis 83'		(Portugal) Costa
2010–11 Champions League	(Netherlands) PAOK – Ajax	3–3	(penalty missed) Ivić 77'		(Spain) Carballo
2010–11 Europa League	(Russia) CSKA Moscow – PAOK	1–1		(penalty missed) Love 80'	(France) Duhamel
2011–12 Europa League	(Ukraine) Karpaty Lviv – PΑΟΚ	1–1		(penalty scored) Lucas 45'	(France) Fautrel
2011–12 Europa League	(England) PAOK – Tottenham Hotspur	0–0	(penalty missed) Lino 33'		(Serbia) Mažić
2011–12 Europa League	(England) Tottenham Hotspur – PAOK	1–2		(penalty scored) Modrić 38'	(Netherlands) Nijhuis
2011–12 Europa League	(Russia) PAOK – Rubin Kazan	1–1	(penalty scored) Vieirinha 15'		(Italy) Orsato
2011–12 Europa League	(Italy) PAOK – Udinese	0–3		(penalty scored) Domizzi 51'	(Norway) Hagen
2013–14 Champions League	(Ukraine) PAOK – Metalist Kharkiv	0–2		(penalty scored) Dević 43'	(Netherlands) van Boekel
2013–14 Europa League	PAOK – Shakhter	2–1		(penalty scored) Cañas 50'	(France) Fautrel
2013–14 Europa League	(Israel) PAOK – Maccabi Haifa	3–2	(penalty missed) Stoch 39' (penalty missed) Stoch 45'		(Spain) Teixeira
2013–14 Europa League	(Netherlands) PAOK – AZ	2–2	(penalty scored) Lucas 37'	(penalty scored) Gorter 71'	(England) Oliver
2013–14 Europa League	(Portugal) Benfica – PAOK	3–0		(penalty scored) Lima 78'	(Poland) Marciniak
2014–15 Europa League	(France) PAOK – Guingamp	1–2	(penalty scored) Athanasiadis 22'		(Netherlands) Blom
2015–16 Europa League	(Slovakia) Spartak Trnava – PAOK	1–1		(penalty scored) Sabo 35'	(Germany) Welz
2015–16 Europa League	PAOK – Brøndby	5–0	(penalty missed) Kaçe 89'		(Spain) Mallenco
2015–16 Europa League	(Russia) Krasnodar – PAOK	2–1		(penalty scored) Joãozinho 67'	(Northern Ireland) Hunter
2016–17 Champions League	(Netherlands) PAOK – Ajax	1–2		(penalty scored) Klaassen 45'+1'	(England) Taylor
2016–17 Europa League	(Georgia (country)) PAOK – Dinamo Tbilisi	2–0	(penalty missed) Djalma 45'		(Austria) Lechner
2016–17 Europa League	(Czech Republic) Slovan Liberec – PAOK	1–2	(penalty scored) Athanasiadis 10'		(Hungary) Bognár
2017–18 Europa League	(Sweden) PAOK – Östersund	3–1	(penalty scored) Prijović 88'	(penalty scored) Nouri 21'	(Netherlands) Nijhuis
2018–19 Champions League	(Russia) PAOK – Spartak Moscow	3–2	(penalty scored) Prijović 29'	(penalty missed) Promes 71'	(Israel) Grinfeld
2018–19 Champions League	(Portugal) Benfica – PAOK	1–1		(penalty scored) Pizzi 45+1'	(Serbia) Mazic
2018–19 Champions League	(Portugal) PAOK – Benfica	1–4		(penalty scored) Salvio 26' (penalty scored) Salvio 49'	(Germany) Brych
2018–19 Europa League	PAOK – BATE Borisov	1–3		(penalty scored) Signevich 42'	(Germany) Welz
2019–20 Champions League	(Netherlands) Ajax – PAOK	3–2		(penalty missed) Tadić 32' (penalty scored) Tadić 43' (penalty scored) Tadić 85'	(England) Pawson
2020–21 Champions League	(Turkey) PAOK – Beşiktaş	3–1	(penalty missed) Akpom 41'		(Italy) Doveri
2020–21 Champions League	(Russia) Krasnodar – PAOK	2–1	(penalty missed) Pelkas 7'	(penalty scored) Claesson 39'	(France) Turpin
2020–21 Europa League	(Netherlands) PAOK – PSV	4–1		(penalty scored) Zahavi 21'	(Poland) Stefański
2020–21 Europa League	(Cyprus) Omonia – PAOK	2–1		(penalty scored) Gómez 84'	(England) Pawson
2023–24 Europa Conference League	(Israel) PAOK – Beitar Jerusalem	0–0	(penalty missed) Schwab 12'		(Ukraine) Balakin
2023–24 Europa Conference League	(Israel) Beitar Jerusalem - PAOK	1–4		(penalty missed) Shua 42'	(France) Millot
2023–24 Europa Conference League	(Croatia) PAOK – Hajduk Split	3–0	(penalty scored) Schwab 12'		(Germany) Stegemann
2023–24 Europa Conference League	(Scotland) Heart of Midlothian – PAOK	1–2	(penalty scored) Schwab 12'	(penalty scored) Shankland 9'	(Latvia) Treimanis
2023–24 Europa Conference League	(Finland) HJK – PAOK	2–3		(penalty scored) Radulović 90+9'	(Romania) Barbu
2023–24 Europa Conference League	(Scotland) Aberdeen – PAOK	2–3	(penalty scored) Schwab 90+6'		(Austria) Gishamer
2023–24 Europa Conference League	(Finland) PAOK – HJK	4–2		(penalty scored) Hetemaj 90+2'	(Georgia (country)) Kruashvili
2023–24 Europa Conference League	(Croatia) PAOK – Dinamo Zagreb	5–1	(penalty scored) A. Živković 88'		(Germany) Osmers
2023–24 Europa Conference League	(Belgium) Club Brugge – PAOK	1–0		(penalty missed) Thiago 78'	(Germany) Siebert
2024–25 Champions League	(Bosnia and Herzegovina) PAOK – Borac Banja Luka	3–2		(penalty scored) Herrera 39'	(Slovenia) Šmajc
2024–25 Europa League	(Republic of Ireland) PAOK – Shamrock Rovers	4–0	(penalty missed) Chalov 90+3'		(Albania) Jorgji
2024–25 Europa League	(Hungary) PAOK – Ferencváros	5–0	(penalty scored) A. Živković 80'		(Spain) Cuadra Fernández
2024–25 Europa League	(Czech Republic) PAOK – Slavia	2–0	(penalty scored) Schwab 26'		(Slovenia) Jug
2025–26 Europa League	(France) Lille – PAOK	3–4	(penalty missed) A. Živković 71'		(Montenegro) Dabanović
2025–26 Europa League	(Norway) PAOK – Brann	1–1		(penalty missed) Kornvig 18'	(Germany) Stegemann
2025–26 Europa League	(Spain) PAOK – Real Betis	2–0	(penalty scored) Giakoumakis 86'		(Italy) Sozza
2025–26 Europa League	(France) Lyon – PAOK	4–2		(penalty missed) Karabec 83'	(Spain) Bengoetxea
2026–27 Europa League	(Belgium) PAOK – Anderlecht	0–1	(penalty missed) Michailidis 36'		(Spain) Martínez Munuera
2026–27 Europa Conference League	(Norway) Brann – PAOK	3–2		(penalty scored) Castro 86'	(England) Brooks

Last updated: 27 August 2026

=== Red cards in European matches ===
Competition	Opponent	Score	Red cards for PAOK players (30)	Red cards for PAOK opponents (24)	Referee
1970–71 Inter-Cities Fairs Cup	(Romania) Dinamo București – PAOK	5–0	Bellis 69'	Moldovan 88'	(Hungary) Gádor
1972–73 Cup Winners' Cup	(Austria) PAOK – Rapid Wien	2–2	Koudas 79'		(Hungary) Palotai
1976–77 European Cup	Dynamo Kyiv – PAOK	4–0	Fountoukidis 74'		(Netherlands) Corver
1983–84 UEFA Cup	(Bulgaria) Lokomotiv Plovdiv – PAOK	1–2		Sotirov 23'	(West Germany) Tritschler
1991–92 UEFA Cup	(Austria) Swarovski Tirol – PAOK	2–0	Borbokis 69'		(Czechoslovakia) Christov
1992–93 UEFA Cup	(France) Paris Saint-Germain – PAOK	2–0	Alexiou 63'		(Scotland) McGinlay
1997–98 UEFA Cup	(Slovakia) PAOK – Spartak Trnava	5–3	Marangos 69'	Ujlaky 31'	(Austria) Stuchlik
1998–99 UEFA Cup	(Scotland) Rangers – PAOK	2–0	Machairidis 8'		Nielsen
1999–00 UEFA Cup	(Portugal) PAOK – Benfica	1–2	Georgiadis 63'		(Switzerland) Soch
2001–02 UEFA Cup	(Austria) PAOK – Kärnten	4–0		Höller 67'	(Portugal) da Silva
2004–05 Champions League	(Israel) Maccabi Tel Aviv – PΑΟΚ	1–0		Siam 67'	(Slovakia) Micheľ
2005–06 UEFA Cup	(Ukraine) Metalurh Donetsk – PAOK	2–2	Karipidis 82' Yiasoumi 84'		(Netherlands) Vink
2005–06 UEFA Cup	(Germany) PAOK – VfB Stuttgart	1–2	Udeze 90'	Meißner 76'	(Spain) Dávila
2010–11 Europa League	(Turkey) PAOK – Fenerbahçe	1–0	Vitolo 57'		(Germany) Gräfe
2011–12 Europa League	(Ukraine) Karpaty Lviv – PΑΟΚ	1–1		Fedetskyi 69'	(France) Fautrel
2011–12 Europa League	(England) Tottenham Hotspur – PAOK	1–2	Stafylidis 37'		(Netherlands) Nijhuis
2011–12 Europa League	(Russia) PAOK – Rubin Kazan	1–1		Ryzhikov 13'	(Italy) Orsato
2012–13 Europa League	(Israel) PAOK – Bnei Yehuda	4–1		Menashe 50'	(Romania) Balaj
2012–13 Europa League	(Austria) PAOK – Rapid Wien	2–1	Lazăr 74'		(England) Marriner
2013–14 Champions League	(Germany) PAOK – Schalke 04	2–3		Jones 64'	(Netherlands) Kuipers
2013–14 Europa League	PAOK – Shakhter	2–1		Paryvaev 87'	(France) Fautrel
2013–14 Europa League	(Portugal) Benfica – PAOK	3–0	Katsouranis 69'		(Poland) Marciniak
2014–15 Europa League	PAOK – Zimbru Chișinău	4–0		Amani 42'	(Ukraine) Boyko
2014–15 Europa League	PAOK – Dinamo Minsk	6–1		Simović 63'	(Finland) Gestranius
2015–16 Europa League	(Slovakia) PAOK – Spartak Trnava	1–0	Vítor 2'		(Norway) Edvartsen
2015–16 Europa League	(Slovakia) Spartak Trnava – PAOK	1–1	Skondras 67'		(Germany) Welz
2015–16 Europa League	(Russia) PAOK – Krasnodar	0–0	Jairo 89'	Jędrzejczyk 88'	(Sweden) Ekberg
2018–19 Champions League	(Russia) Spartak Moscow – PAOK	0–0		Luiz Adriano 33'	(France) Buquet
2018–19 Champions League	(Portugal) PAOK – Benfica	1–4	Matos 76'		(Germany) Brych
2018–19 Europa League	(England) Chelsea – PAOK	4–0	Khacheridi 7'		(Estonia) Tohver
2018–19 Europa League	PAOK – BATE Borisov	1–3		Signevich 61'	(Germany) Welz
2021–22 Europa Conference League	(Denmark) Copenhagen – PAOK	1–2		Grabara 9'	(Belgium) Lambrechts
2021–22 Europa Conference League	(Denmark) PAOK – Copenhagen	1–2	Michailidis 90+4'		(Poland) Raczkowski
2022–23 Europa Conference League	(Bulgaria) PAOK – Levski Sofia	1–1	Douglas Augusto 72' Vieirinha 81'		(Spain) Soto Grado
2023–24 Europa Conference League	(Israel) Beitar Jerusalem – PAOK	1–4	Douglas Augusto 40'		(France) Millot
2023–24 Europa Conference League	(Germany) PAOK – Eintracht Frankfurt	2–1	Meïté 90+6'	Trapp 90+6'	(Italy) Sozza
2023–24 Europa Conference League	(Germany) Eintracht Frankfurt – PAOK	1–2		Jakić 90+4'	(Poland) Sylwestrzak
2024–25 Europa League	(Republic of Ireland) PAOK – Shamrock Rovers	4–0		Honohan 52'	(Albania) Jorgji
2024–25 Europa League	(Romania) PAOK – FCSB	0–1		Olaru 55'	(Germany) Stegemann
2024–25 Europa League	(Czech Republic) PAOK – Viktoria Plzeň	2–2		Dweh 70'	(Switzerland) Schnyder
2024–25 Europa League	(Romania) PAOK – FCSB	1–2	Taison 45+4'		(Belgium) Visser
2025–26 Europa League	(Croatia) PAOK – Rijeka	5–0		Majstorović 71'	(Spain) Sánchez Martínez
2025–26 Europa League	(France) Lille – PAOK	3–4	Kędziora 90+9'		(Montenegro) Dabanović
2025–26 Europa League	(Switzerland) PAOK – Young Boys	4–0		Gigović 6'	(Serbia) Jovanović
2025–26 Europa League	(France) Lyon – PAOK	4–2	Konstantelias 41'		(Spain) Bengoetxea
2026–27 Europa League	(Belgium) Anderlecht – PAOK	3–2	Živković 89' Jeremejeff 90+4'		(Italy) Sozza

Last updated: 13 August 2026

=== Attendance record ===
Top attendance records at home and away European matches (not available for all the matches; the rank could be different).

Home				Away			
1975–76 UEFA Cup	Toumba Stadium	(Spain) PAOK – Barcelona 1–0	45,200	2024–25 Europa League	Old Trafford	(England) Manchester United – PAOK 2–0	73,174
1973–74 Cup Winners' Cup	Toumba Stadium	(Italy) PAOK – Milan 2–2	43,882	1988–89 UEFA Cup	Stadio San Paolo	(Italy) Napoli – PAOK 1–0	62,662
1988–89 UEFA Cup	Toumba Stadium	(Italy) PAOK – Napoli 1–1	39,848	2023–24 Conference League	Deutsche Bank Park	(Germany) Eintracht Frankfurt – PAOK 1–2	58,000
1974–75 Cup Winners' Cup	Toumba Stadium	(Socialist Federal Republic of Yugoslavia) PAOK – Red Star Belgrade 1–0	39,167	2015–16 Europa League	Signal Iduna Park	(Germany) Borussia Dortmund – PAOK 0–1	55,200
1973–74 Cup Winners' Cup	Toumba Stadium	(Poland) PAOK – Legia Warsaw 1–0	36,711	2019–20 Champions League	Johan Cruyff Arena	(Netherlands) Ajax – PAOK 3–2	53,942
1997–98 UEFA Cup	Toumba Stadium	(England) PAOK – Arsenal 1–0	33,117	2013–14 Champions League	Veltins Arena	(Germany) Schalke 04 – PAOK 1–1	52,444
1972–73 Cup Winners' Cup	Toumba Stadium	(Austria) PAOK – Rapid Wien 2–2	32,420	2024–25 Europa League	Rams Park	(Turkey) Galatasaray – PAOK 3–1	50,700
1973–74 Cup Winners' Cup	Toumba Stadium	(France) PAOK – Lyon 4–0	30,416	2016–17 Europa League	Veltins Arena	(Germany) Schalke 04 – PAOK 1–1	50,619
1998–99 UEFA Cup	Toumba Stadium	(Scotland) PAOK – Rangers 0–0	30,338	2024–25 Europa League	Arena Națională	(Romania) FCSB – PAOK 2–0	50,248
1983–84 UEFA Cup	Toumba Stadium	(West Germany) PAOK – Bayern Munich 0–0	28,446	2016–17 Champions League	Amsterdam Arena	(Netherlands) Ajax – PAOK 1–1	47,744

=== Notable wins ===
Notable wins

Season	Match	Score
UEFA Champions League / European Cup
2018–19	PAOK – (Russia) Spartak Moscow	3–2
2020–21	PAOK – (Portugal) Benfica	2–1
UEFA Cup Winners' Cup
1973–74	PAOK – (France) Lyon	4–0
UEFA Europa League / UEFA Cup
1975–76	PAOK – (Spain) Barcelona	1–0
1982–83	PAOK – (Spain) Sevilla	2–0
1997–98	PAOK – (England) Arsenal	1–0
1999–2000	(Portugal) Benfica – PAOK	1–2
2000–01	PAOK – (Italy) Udinese	3–0 (a.e.t.)
2001–02	PAOK – (Netherlands) PSV Eindhoven	3–2
2010–11	PAOK – (Spain) Villarreal	1–0
2011–12	(England) Tottenham Hotspur – PAOK	1–2
2015–16	(Germany) Borussia Dortmund – PAOK	0–1
2016–17	(Italy) Fiorentina – PAOK	2–3
2020–21	PAOK – (Netherlands) PSV Eindhoven	4–1
2025–26	(France) Lille – PAOK	3–4
2025–26	PAOK – (Spain) Real Betis	2–0
UEFA Conference League
2021–22	PAOK – (Denmark) Midtjylland	2–1
2021–22	(Belgium) Gent – PAOK	1–2
2023–24	PAOK – (Germany) Eintracht Frankfurt	2–1
2023–24	(Germany) Eintracht Frankfurt – PAOK	1–2
2023–24	PAOK – (Croatia) Dinamo Zagreb	5–1

Biggest wins

Season	Match	Score
UEFA Champions League / European Cup
2018–19	(Switzerland) Basel – PAOK	0–3
UEFA Cup Winners' Cup
1973–74	PAOK – (France) Lyon	4–0
UEFA Europa League / UEFA Cup
1999–2000	(Georgia (country)) Locomotive Tbilisi – PAOK	0–7
2001–02	PAOK – (Czech Republic) Příbram	6–1
2005–06	PAOK – (France) Rennes	5–1
2014–15	PAOK – (Moldova) Zimbru Chișinău	4–0
2014–15	PAOK – (Belarus) Dinamo Minsk	6–1
2015–16	PAOK – (Croatia) Lokomotiva	6–0
2015–16	PAOK – (Denmark) Brøndby	5–0
2024–25	PAOK – (Republic of Ireland) Shamrock Rovers	4–0
2024–25	PAOK – (Hungary) Ferencváros	5–0
2025–26	PAOK – (Croatia) Rijeka	5–0
2025–26	PAOK – (Switzerland) Young Boys	4–0
UEFA Conference League
2023–24	PAOK – (Scotland) Heart of Midlothian	4–0
2023–24	PAOK – (Croatia) Dinamo Zagreb	5–1

Last updated: 22 January 2026
