= 1983 Soviet Army Cup final =

1983 Cup of the Soviet Army final
Lokomotiv Plovdiv	Chirpan
B Group	B Group
3	1
- Date: 1 June 1983
- Venue: Vasil Levski National Stadium, Sofia
- Attendance: 25,000

The 1983 Cup of the Soviet Army final was the 1st final of the Cup of the Soviet Army (as a secondary cup tournament in Bulgaria), and was contested between Lokomotiv Plovdiv and Chirpan on 1 June 1983 at Vasil Levski National Stadium in Sofia. Lokomotiv won the final 3–1.

== Match ==
=== Details ===
1 June 1983

Lokomotiv Plovdiv	3−1	Chirpan
Sotirov 2'; Bonev 29'; Eranosyan 88'		B. Staykov 57'

Vasil Levski National Stadium, Sofia
Attendance: 25,000

Lokomotiv	Chirpan

GK	1	(Bulgaria) Stefan Staykov
DF	2	(Bulgaria) Iliya Anchev
DF	3	(Bulgaria) Nikolay Kurbanov
DF	4	(Bulgaria) Plamen Nikolov
DF	5	(Bulgaria) Petko Stankov
MF	6	(Bulgaria) Ivan Bedelev	(substituted off) 88'
FW	7	(Bulgaria) Hristo Sotirov
MF	8	(Bulgaria) Hristo Bonev (c)
FW	9	(Bulgaria) Eduard Eranosyan
FW	10	(Bulgaria) Ayan Sadakov
MF	11	(Bulgaria) Lyubomir Burnarski	(substituted off) 78'
Substitutes:
MF	--	(Bulgaria) Ivan Naydenov	(substituted in) 78'
MF	--	(Bulgaria) Georgi Fidanov	(substituted in) 88'
Manager:
(Bulgaria) Atanas Dramov
