= Eduard Eranosyan =

Bulgarian footballer

Personal information
- Full name: Eduard Antranik Eranosyan
- Date of birth: 8 February 1961 (age 65)
- Place of birth: Plovdiv, Bulgaria
- Height: 1.85 m (6 ft 1 in)
- Position: Striker

Senior career*
Years	Team	Apps	(Gls)
1977–1988	Lokomotiv Plovdiv	299	(140)
1988–1989	Apollon Kalamarias	1	(0)
1989–1990	Vitória de Setúbal	11	(0)
1990–1991	Leixões	31	(22)
1991–1992	Boavista	8	(0)
1992–1993	Leixões	20	(4)
1993–1995	Lokomotiv Plovdiv	6	(0)
1996–1998	Leixões	26	(7)

International career
1982–1986	Bulgaria	5	(0)

Managerial career
- 1997–1999: Leixões
- 2000–2001: Lokomotiv Plovdiv
- 2001–2002: Dobrudzha Dobrich
- 2003–2005: Lokomotiv Plovdiv
- 2007: Beroe Stara Zagora
- 2008: APOP
- 2008: Enosis Neon
- 2013–2014: Kabuscorp
- 2015: Ludogorets Razgrad
- 2016–2017: Lokomotiv Plovdiv
- 2019–2020: Doxa Katokopias
- * Club domestic league appearances and goals

Eduard Antranik Eranosyan (Bulgarian: Едуард Антраник Ераносян; born 8 February 1961), nicknamed "Edo" (Bulgarian: Едо), is a Bulgarian football manager and a former player who played as a striker. Eranosyan played for Lokomotiv Plovdiv, Vitória de Setúbal, Leixões and Boavista.

== Career ==
=== Playing career ===
Beginning in 1978, he played for Lokomotiv Plovdiv (1977–1988, 1989, 1993–1994) as one of the club's most acclaimed attackers, featuring in 158 matches and scoring 62 goals in the A PFG, winning the Cup of the Soviet Army in 1983 and being the championship's top goalscorer in 1984. Later, he also played in Greece and Portugal, for Apollon Kalamarias (1988–1989), Vitória (1989–1990), Leixões S.C. (1990–1991, 1992–1993 and 1996–1997) and Boavista F.C. (1991–1992). Eranosyan has 10 caps for the Bulgaria national football team. He was known for his flair and view of the game.

=== Manager career ===
Eranosyan began his managing career at Leixões, which he coached between 1997 and 1999. He then took up the manager job at Lokomotiv Plovdiv, remaining there in 2000–2001 and between 2003 and 2005 (leading the team to its first and only championship title in 2004), also managing PFC Dobrudzha Dobrich in 2001–2002. Since 23 March 2007, he has been at the helm of PFC Beroe Stara Zagora. After he moved in Cyprus for APOP Kinyras Peyias. Then, in December 2008 he changed to Enosis Neon Paralimni continuing his adventure in Cyprus. In 2013 was appointed as a head coach of Angola football club Kabuscorp Sport Club.

Eranosyan also holds Portuguese citizenship.

== Honours ==
=== Player honours ===
Lokomotiv Plovdiv

- Cup of the Soviet Army (1): 1983
- Bulgarian A PFG top goalscorer (1): 1984

Boavista F.C.

- Taça de Portugal (1): 1991–92

=== Manager honours ===
Lokomotiv Plovdiv

- Bulgarian A PFG (1): 2003-04
- Bulgarian Supercup (1): 2004
- Manager of the year in Bulgarian football (1): 2004

Kabuscorp S.C.P.

- Girabola (1): 2013
