= Ayan Sadakov =

Bulgarian footballer (1961–2017)

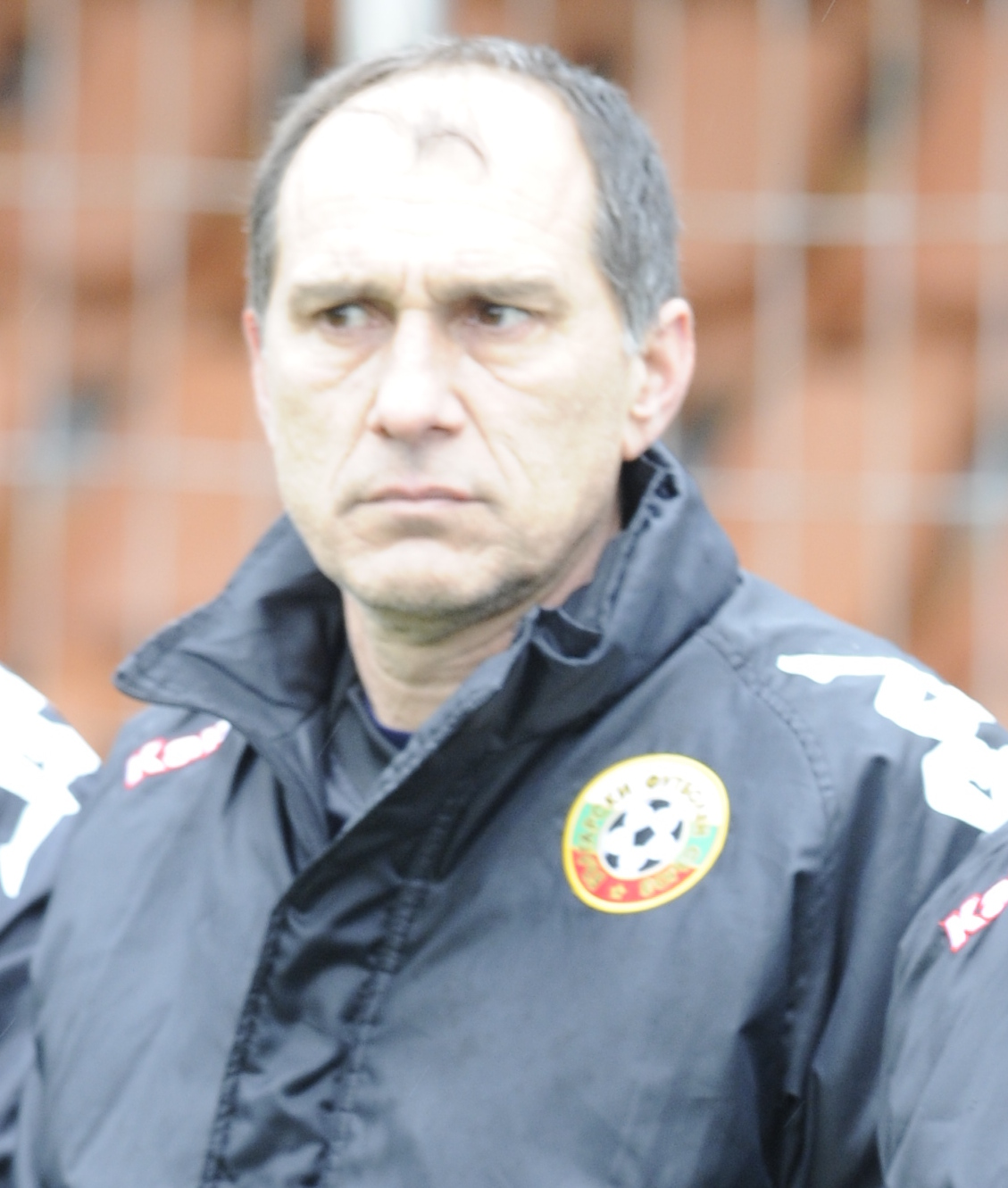
- Sadakov in 2013

Personal information
- Full name: Ayan Faikov Sadakov
- Date of birth: 26 September 1961
- Place of birth: Plovdiv, Bulgaria
- Date of death: 1 July 2017 (aged 55)
- Place of death: Plovdiv, Bulgaria
- Height: 1.76 m (5 ft 9 in)
- Position: Midfielder

Senior career*
Years	Team	Apps	(Gls)
1978–1989	Lokomotiv Plovdiv	320	(111)
1989–1991	Belenenses	48	(9)
1992–1993	Lokomotiv Plovdiv	31	(6)
1994–1996	Botev Plovdiv	20	(2)
Total		419	(127)

International career
1981–1991	Bulgaria	80	(9)

Managerial career
- 2006–2007: Lokomotiv Plovdiv
- 2008–2009: Lokomotiv Plovdiv
- * Club domestic league appearances and goals

Ayan Faikov Sadakov (Bulgarian: Аян Фаиков Садъков) (26 September 1961 – 1 July 2017) was a Bulgarian footballer and a key member of the Bulgarian national team in the 1986 FIFA World Cup.

== Club career ==
Sadakov began his club career at the local Lokomotiv Plovdiv. For "The Smurfs" he played eleven seasons, before transferring to Portugal's C.F. Os Belenenses in 1989. Two years later he return in Lokomotiv and played two years, before signed with Botev Plovdiv in summer 1994.

== International ==
Sadakov made 80 appearances for Bulgaria, between 1981 and 1991 and scored 9 goals. He played in four matches for his country at 1986 FIFA World Cup.

== Coaching career ==
Sadakov had been appointed on September 29, 2008 as a manager of Lokomotiv Plovdiv a second time to replace Dragan Kanatlarovski.

== Personal life ==
In 2014, Sadakov announced he was diagnosed with ALS. He died on 1 July 2017, aged 55.

== Honours ==
Lokomotiv Plovdiv

- Cup of the Soviet Army (1): 1983
