= 2025 UEFA European Under-19 Championship squads =

Player listings in youth football competition

The 2025 UEFA European Under-19 Championship was an international football tournament held in Romania from 13 to 26 June 2025.

Each national team submitted a squad of 20 players, two of whom had to be goalkeepers.

Players in boldface have been capped at full international level since the tournament.

Players born on or after 1 January 2006 were eligible to participate. The age listed for each player is their age as of 13 June 2025, the first day of the tournament.

== Group A ==
=== Denmark ===
The final squad was announced on 27 May 2025.

Head coach: Lasse Stensgaard

No.	Pos.	Player	Date of birth (age)	Club
1	GK	Oscar Buur	29 October 2006 (aged 18)	(Danish Football Association) Copenhagen
16	GK	Lucas Nygaard	26 June 2006 (aged 18)	(The Football Association) Arsenal
2	DF	Hjalte Bidstrup	15 February 2006 (aged 19)	(Danish Football Association) Viborg
3	DF	Cornelius Olsson	27 February 2006 (aged 19)	(Italian Football Federation) Torino
4	DF	Luka Callø	10 May 2006 (aged 19)	(Danish Football Association) Kolding
5	DF	Tobias Slotsager	1 January 2006 (aged 19)	(Italian Football Federation) Hellas Verona
6	DF	Lukas Larsen	11 March 2006 (aged 19)	(Danish Football Association) Brøndby
12	DF	Julius Askou	27 May 2006 (aged 19)	(Danish Football Association) OB
20	DF	Markus Walker	23 November 2006 (aged 18)	(Danish Football Association) Nordsjælland
7	MF	Justin Janssen	25 July 2006 (aged 18)	(Danish Football Association) Nordsjælland
8	MF	Villum Berthelsen	14 April 2006 (aged 19)	(Danish Football Association) Nordsjælland
9	MF	Laurits Pedersen	25 January 2006 (aged 19)	(Danish Football Association) Randers
13	MF	Julius Nielsen	26 April 2006 (aged 19)	(Danish Football Association) Silkeborg
15	MF	Nikolaj Juul-Sandberg	21 April 2006 (aged 19)	(Danish Football Association) OB
18	MF	Mathias Kaarsbo	13 February 2006 (aged 19)	(Danish Football Association) Lyngby
10	FW	Mike Themsen	10 March 2006 (aged 19)	(Danish Football Association) Randers
11	FW	Oscar Schwartau	17 May 2006 (aged 19)	(The Football Association) Norwich City
14	FW	Jonathan Agyekum	23 March 2006 (aged 19)	(Danish Football Association) Brøndby
17	FW	Frederik Emmery	25 December 2006 (aged 18)	(Danish Football Association) AGF
19	FW	Olti Hyseni	17 July 2007 (aged 17)	(Danish Football Association) SønderjyskE

=== Montenegro ===
The final squad was announced on 4 June 2025.

Head coach: Nenad Vukčević

No.	Pos.	Player	Date of birth (age)	Club
1	GK	Ognjen Milović	14 March 2006 (aged 19)	(Football Association of Montenegro) Kom
12	GK	Tomaš Đurović	14 September 2006 (aged 18)	(Football Association of Montenegro) Iskra
2	DF	Miloš Vračar	10 June 2006 (aged 19)	(Football Association of Montenegro) Podgorica
3	DF	Lazar Maraš	1 January 2006 (aged 19)	(Football Association of Montenegro) Dečić
4	DF	Bojan Damjanović	6 June 2006 (aged 19)	(Football Association of Montenegro) Sutjeska Nikšić
5	DF	Bodin Tomašević	12 May 2006 (aged 19)	(Italian Football Federation) Bologna
6	DF	Aleksa Karadžić	4 March 2006 (aged 19)	(Football Association of Montenegro) Iskra
22	DF	Lazar Šekularac	11 October 2006 (aged 18)	(Football Association of Montenegro) Jedinstvo
7	MF	**Marko Perović**	5 March 2006 (aged 19)	(Royal Spanish Football Federation) Almería
8	MF	Stefan Đukanović	23 June 2006 (aged 18)	(Football Association of Montenegro) Budućnost
10	MF	Danilo Vukanić	11 August 2006 (aged 18)	(Football Association of Montenegro) Budućnost
11	MF	Andrej Camaj	12 March 2006 (aged 19)	(Football Association of Montenegro) Budućnost
15	MF	Lazar Zlatičanin	15 April 2006 (aged 19)	(Football Association of Montenegro) Mornar
16	MF	Danilo Ćetković	19 July 2006 (aged 18)	(Football Association of Montenegro) Sutjeska Nikšić
17	MF	Vuk Vlahović	10 January 2007 (aged 18)	(Croatian Football Federation) Dinamo Zagreb
18	MF	Lazar Savović	12 January 2008 (aged 17)	(Football Association of Montenegro) Budućnost
20	MF	Petar Jauković	12 June 2007 (aged 18)	(Football Association of Serbia) Vojvodina
9	FW	Marko Tadić	25 February 2006 (aged 19)	(Football Association of Serbia) Partizan
19	FW	Filip Perović	18 July 2006 (aged 18)	(Football Association of Montenegro) Iskra
21	FW	**Andrej Kostić**	16 January 2007 (aged 18)	(Football Association of Montenegro) Budućnost

=== Romania ===
The final squad was announced on 11 June 2025.

Head coach: Marin Ion

No.	Pos.	Player	Date of birth (age)	Club
1	GK	Rafael Munteanu	1 March 2006 (aged 19)	(Romanian Football Federation) Câmpulung Muscel
12	GK	Máté Simon	19 July 2006 (aged 18)	(Romanian Football Federation) Csíkszereda
2	DF	Alin Chinteș	7 February 2006 (aged 19)	(Romanian Football Federation) Unirea Ungheni
3	DF	Darius Fălcușan	14 February 2006 (aged 19)	(Italian Football Federation) Empoli
4	DF	Răzvan Călugăr	6 April 2006 (aged 19)	(Romanian Football Federation) Unirea Alba Iulia
5	DF	Emanuel Marincău	7 April 2006 (aged 19)	(German Football Association) Mainz 05
6	DF	Mario Bărăitaru	8 December 2006 (aged 18)	(Romanian Football Federation) Slatina
13	DF	Ionuț Cercel	14 November 2006 (aged 18)	(Romanian Football Federation) FCSB
14	DF	Matei Marin	19 May 2006 (aged 19)	(Romanian Football Federation) Steaua București
16	DF	Raul Marița	27 September 2006 (aged 18)	(German Football Association) Greuther Fürth
7	MF	Ianis Tarbă	4 July 2006 (aged 18)	(Royal Spanish Football Federation) Celta Vigo
8	MF	Luca Szimionaș	3 September 2006 (aged 18)	(Italian Football Federation) Hellas Verona
10	MF	**David Matei**	19 July 2006 (aged 18)	(Romanian Football Federation) Steaua București
11	MF	David Păcuraru	17 February 2006 (aged 19)	(Romanian Football Federation) Steaua București
16	MF	Luca Băsceanu	17 May 2006 (aged 19)	(Romanian Football Federation) Farul Constanța
18	MF	Remus Guțea	2 November 2006 (aged 18)	(Romanian Football Federation) Voluntari
9	FW	Jason Kodor	9 January 2006 (aged 19)	(Italian Football Federation) Lecce
17	FW	Vlad Dănciuțiu	11 July 2006 (aged 18)	(United States Soccer Federation) Austin FC
19	FW	Ioan Vermeșan	18 October 2006 (aged 18)	(Italian Football Federation) Hellas Verona
20	FW	David Barbu	26 June 2006 (aged 18)	(Romanian Football Federation) Universitatea Craiova

=== Spain ===
The final squad was announced on 9 June 2025.

Head coach: Paco Gallardo

No.	Pos.	Player	Date of birth (age)	Club
1	GK	Raúl Jiménez	16 February 2006 (aged 19)	(Royal Spanish Football Federation) Valencia
13	GK	Simón García	19 April 2007 (aged 18)	(Royal Spanish Football Federation) Basconia
2	DF	Alexis Olmedo	2 January 2006 (aged 19)	(Royal Spanish Football Federation) Barcelona
3	DF	Dani Muñoz	19 July 2006 (aged 18)	(Royal Spanish Football Federation) Atlético Madrid
4	DF	Jon Martín	23 April 2006 (aged 19)	(Royal Spanish Football Federation) Real Sociedad
5	DF	Andrés Cuenca	11 June 2007 (aged 18)	(Royal Spanish Football Federation) Barcelona
15	DF	Jofre Torrents	28 January 2007 (aged 18)	(Royal Spanish Football Federation) Barcelona
6	MF	Quim Junyent	25 March 2007 (aged 18)	(Royal Spanish Football Federation) Barcelona
8	MF	Jano Monserrate	28 January 2006 (aged 19)	(Royal Spanish Football Federation) Atlético Madrid
14	MF	Izan Merino	15 April 2006 (aged 19)	(Royal Spanish Football Federation) Málaga
16	MF	Tommy Marqués	30 October 2006 (aged 18)	(Royal Spanish Football Federation) Barcelona
18	MF	Alejandro Granados	30 May 2006 (aged 19)	(Royal Belgian Football Association) Club Brugge
19	MF	Óscar Marcos	19 February 2006 (aged 19)	(Royal Spanish Football Federation) Celta Vigo
20	MF	Gonzalo Pastor	20 March 2006 (aged 19)	(Royal Spanish Football Federation) Castellón
7	FW	Dani Díaz	22 June 2006 (aged 18)	(Royal Spanish Football Federation) Real Sociedad
9	FW	Omar Janneh	23 August 2006 (aged 18)	(Royal Spanish Football Federation) Atlético Madrid
10	FW	Antonio Cordero	14 November 2006 (aged 18)	(Royal Spanish Football Federation) Málaga
11	FW	Peio Huestamendia	8 November 2006 (aged 18)	(Royal Spanish Football Federation) Basconia
12	FW	Jan Virgili	26 July 2006 (aged 18)	(Royal Spanish Football Federation) Barcelona
17	MF	Pablo García	13 June 2006 (aged 19)	(Royal Spanish Football Federation) Real Betis

== Group B ==
=== England ===
The final squad was announced on 19 May 2025.

Head coach: Will Antwi

No.	Pos.	Player	Date of birth (age)	Club
1	GK	Tommy Setford	13 March 2006 (aged 19)	(The Football Association) Arsenal
13	GK	Finlay Herrick	18 January 2006 (aged 19)	(The Football Association) West Ham United
2	DF	Triston Rowe	2 October 2006 (aged 18)	(The Football Association) Aston Villa
3	DF	Joe Johnson	21 February 2006 (aged 19)	(The Football Association) Luton Town
4	DF	Stephen Mfuni	12 February 2008 (aged 17)	(The Football Association) Manchester City
5	DF	Zach Abbott	13 May 2006 (aged 19)	(The Football Association) Nottingham Forest
12	DF	Caleb Kporha	15 July 2006 (aged 18)	(The Football Association) Crystal Palace
14	DF	Harrison Murray-Campbell	4 August 2006 (aged 18)	(The Football Association) Chelsea
20	DF	Jayden Meghoma	28 June 2006 (aged 18)	(The Football Association) Preston North End
6	MF	Kiano Dyer	21 November 2006 (aged 18)	(The Football Association) Chelsea
8	MF	Chris Rigg	18 June 2007 (aged 17)	(The Football Association) Sunderland
10	MF	Joshua King	3 January 2007 (aged 18)	(The Football Association) Fulham
16	MF	Reiss-Alexander Russell-Denny	11 May 2006 (aged 19)	(The Football Association) Tottenham Hotspur
7	FW	Sam Amo-Ameyaw	18 July 2006 (aged 18)	(French Football Federation) Strasbourg
9	FW	Ethan Wheatley	20 January 2006 (aged 19)	(The Football Association) Manchester United
11	FW	Mikey Moore	11 August 2007 (aged 17)	(The Football Association) Tottenham Hotspur
15	FW	Kadan Young	19 January 2006 (aged 19)	(Royal Belgian Football Association) Royal Antwerp
17	FW	Tom Watson	8 April 2006 (aged 19)	(The Football Association) Sunderland
18	FW	Shim Mheuka	20 October 2007 (aged 17)	(The Football Association) Chelsea
19	FW	Jesse Derry	30 June 2007 (aged 17)	(The Football Association) Crystal Palace

=== Germany ===
The final squad was announced on 20 May 2025.

Head coach: Hanno Balitsch

No.	Pos.	Player	Date of birth (age)	Club
1	GK	Konstantin Heide	27 January 2006 (aged 19)	(German Football Association) SpVgg Unterhaching
12	GK	Max Schmitt	18 January 2006 (aged 19)	(German Football Association) Bayern Munich
2	DF	Taylan Bulut	19 January 2006 (aged 19)	(German Football Association) Schalke 04
3	DF	Almugera Kabar	6 June 2006 (aged 19)	(German Football Association) Borussia Dortmund
4	DF	Elias Decker	15 March 2006 (aged 19)	(German Football Association) Ingolstadt
5	DF	Maximilian Herwerth	9 February 2006 (aged 19)	(German Football Association) VfB Stuttgart
13	DF	Maximilian Hennig	12 October 2006 (aged 18)	(German Football Association) SpVgg Unterhaching
14	DF	Leopold Wurm	21 March 2006 (aged 19)	(German Football Association) Jahn Regensburg
15	DF	Lukas Reich	24 October 2006 (aged 18)	(German Football Association) 1860 Munich
6	MF	Winners Osawe	29 November 2006 (aged 18)	(German Football Association) Nürnberg
8	MF	Kjell Wätjen	16 February 2006 (aged 19)	(German Football Association) Borussia Dortmund
10	MF	Noah Darvich	25 September 2006 (aged 18)	(Royal Spanish Football Federation) Barcelona
16	MF	Mateo Kritzer	7 March 2006 (aged 19)	(German Football Association) Karlsruher SC
18	MF	**Assan Ouédraogo**	9 May 2006 (aged 19)	(German Football Association) RB Leipzig
19	MF	Jarzinho Malanga	10 July 2006 (aged 18)	(German Football Association) VfB Stuttgart
7	FW	Paris Brunner	15 February 2006 (aged 19)	(Royal Belgian Football Association) Cercle Brugge
9	FW	Max Moerstedt	15 January 2006 (aged 19)	(German Football Association) Hoffenheim
11	FW	Said El Mala	26 August 2006 (aged 18)	(German Football Association) Viktoria Köln
17	FW	Charles Herrmann	21 January 2006 (aged 19)	(German Football Association) Borussia Mönchengladbach
20	FW	Robert Ramšak	28 October 2006 (aged 18)	(German Football Association) RB Leipzig

=== Netherlands ===
The final squad was announced on 30 May 2025.

Head coach: Peter van der Veen

No.	Pos.	Player	Date of birth (age)	Club
1	GK	Joeri Heerkens	8 March 2006 (aged 19)	(Football Association of the Czech Republic) Sparta Prague
16	GK	Kyani Zeggen	15 October 2006 (aged 18)	(Royal Dutch Football Association) AZ
2	DF	Givairo Read	2 June 2006 (aged 19)	(Royal Dutch Football Association) Feyenoord
3	DF	Precious Ugwu	8 February 2006 (aged 19)	(Royal Dutch Football Association) Ajax
4	DF	Dies Janse	17 January 2006 (aged 19)	(Royal Dutch Football Association) Ajax
13	DF	Sven van der Plas	1 February 2006 (aged 19)	(Royal Dutch Football Association) PSV
14	DF	Shane van Aarle	5 June 2006 (aged 19)	(Royal Dutch Football Association) FC Eindhoven
18	DF	Mats Rots	11 March 2006 (aged 19)	(Royal Dutch Football Association) Heracles Almelo
5	MF	Elijah Dijkstra	5 August 2006 (aged 18)	(Royal Dutch Football Association) AZ
6	MF	Tygo Land	11 January 2006 (aged 19)	(Royal Dutch Football Association) PSV
8	MF	Mark Verkuijl	10 February 2006 (aged 19)	(Royal Dutch Football Association) Ajax
10	MF	**Kees Smit**	20 January 2006 (aged 19)	(Royal Dutch Football Association) AZ
12	MF	Kasper Boogaard	29 January 2006 (aged 19)	(Royal Dutch Football Association) AZ
20	MF	Tim Braem	13 February 2006 (aged 19)	(Royal Dutch Football Association) VVV-Venlo
7	FW	Ayoub Oufkir	4 January 2006 (aged 19)	(Royal Dutch Football Association) Sparta Rotterdam
9	FW	Don-Angelo Konadu	3 May 2006 (aged 19)	(Royal Dutch Football Association) Ajax
11	FW	Aymen Sliti	24 March 2006 (aged 19)	(Royal Dutch Football Association) Feyenoord
15	FW	Zepiqueno Redmond	22 June 2006 (aged 18)	(Royal Dutch Football Association) Feyenoord
17	FW	Owen Panneflek	4 October 2006 (aged 18)	(Royal Dutch Football Association) Twente
19	FW	Lucas Vennegoor of Hesselink	14 March 2006 (aged 19)	(Royal Dutch Football Association) Twente

=== Norway ===
The final squad was announced on 26 May 2025.

Head coach: Even Sel

No.	Pos.	Player	Date of birth (age)	Club
1	GK	Daniel Sætren	2 April 2006 (aged 19)	(Norwegian Football Federation) Sogndal
23	GK	Einar Fauskanger	18 July 2008 (aged 16)	(Norwegian Football Federation) Haugesund
2	DF	Luca Høyland	26 June 2006 (aged 18)	(Norwegian Football Federation) Skeid
3	DF	Mathias Øren	21 April 2006 (aged 19)	(Norwegian Football Federation) Sogndal
4	DF	Fillip Botnen	11 June 2006 (aged 19)	(Norwegian Football Federation) Viking
5	DF	Jonathan Norbye	26 March 2007 (aged 18)	(German Football Association) RB Leipzig
13	DF	Karsten Ekorness	7 July 2006 (aged 18)	(Norwegian Football Federation) Stabæk
15	DF	Mikkel Hope	8 August 2006 (aged 18)	(Norwegian Football Federation) Haugesund
17	DF	Fanuel Ghebreyohannes	3 December 2006 (aged 18)	(Norwegian Football Federation) Egersunds
6	MF	Andreas Heredia-Randen	22 February 2006 (aged 19)	(Norwegian Football Federation) Strømsgodset
8	MF	Sondre Granaas	30 August 2006 (aged 18)	(Norwegian Football Federation) Molde
14	MF	Troy Nyhammer	19 August 2006 (aged 18)	(Norwegian Football Federation) Haugesund
18	MF	Lars Remmem	18 February 2006 (aged 19)	(Norwegian Football Federation) Brann
19	MF	Sigurd Prestmo	6 October 2006 (aged 18)	(Norwegian Football Federation) Tromsø
21	MF	William Osnes-Ringen	13 November 2006 (aged 18)	(Norwegian Football Federation) HamKam
7	FW	Julian Gonstad	29 June 2006 (aged 18)	(Norwegian Football Federation) HamKam
11	FW	Alexander Røssing-Lelesiit	20 January 2007 (aged 18)	(German Football Association) Hamburger SV
16	FW	Niklas Fuglestad	20 May 2006 (aged 19)	(Norwegian Football Federation) Viking
20	FW	Jesper Reitan-Sunde	31 January 2006 (aged 19)	(Norwegian Football Federation) Rosenborg
22	FW	Magnus Holte	27 March 2006 (aged 19)	(Norwegian Football Federation) Hødd
