= England national under-19 football team =

National U-19 football team

England U-19
- Nickname: The Young Lions
- Association: The Football Association (The FA)
- Confederation: UEFA (Europe)
- Head coach: Ben Futcher
- FIFA code: ENG
| First colours | Second colours |

European Championship
- Appearances: 46 (first in 1948)
- Best result: Winners: (1948, 1963, 1964, 1971, 1972, 1973, 1975, 1980, 1993, 2017, 2022)

England national under-19 football team, also known as England under-19s or England U19(s), represents England in association football at under-19 age level and is controlled by the Football Association, the governing body for football in England. Primarily, it competes to qualify for the annual UEFA European Under-19 Championship.

== Competition history ==
=== UEFA European Under-19 Championship ===
| Year | Round | GP | W | D* | L | GS | GA | Squad |
|---|---|---|---|---|---|---|---|---|
| (Norway) 2002 | Group stage | 3 | 0 | 2 | 1 | 6 | 7 | Squad |
| (Liechtenstein) 2003 | Group stage | 3 | 1 | 0 | 2 | 3 | 5 | Squad |
| (Switzerland) 2004 | Elite round | | | | | | | |
| (Northern Ireland) 2005 | Runners-up | 5 | 2 | 2 | 1 | 9 | 8 | Squad |
| (Poland) 2006 | Elite round | | | | | | | |
| (Austria) 2007 | Elite round | | | | | | | |
| (Czech Republic) 2008 | Group stage | 3 | 1 | 1 | 1 | 3 | 2 | Squad |
| (Ukraine) 2009 | Runners-up | 5 | 2 | 2 | 1 | 13 | 7 | Squad |
| (France) 2010 | Semi-finals | 4 | 1 | 1 | 2 | 5 | 7 | Squad |
| (Romania) 2011 | Elite round | | | | | | | |
| (Estonia) 2012 | Semi-finals | 4 | 2 | 1 | 1 | 6 | 5 | Squad |
| (Lithuania) 2013 | Elite round | | | | | | | |
| (Hungary) 2014 | Elite round | | | | | | | |
| (Greece) 2015 | Elite round | | | | | | | |
| (Germany) 2016 | Semi-finals | 4 | 3 | 0 | 1 | 7 | 4 | Squad |
| (Georgia (country)) 2017 | Champions | 5 | 5 | 0 | 0 | 10 | 2 | Squad |
| (Finland) 2018 | Group stage | 4 | 1 | 1 | 2 | 4 | 11 | Squad |
| (Armenia) 2019 | Elite round | | | | | | | |
| (Northern Ireland) 2020 | Cancelled due to the COVID-19 pandemic in Europe | | | | | | | |
| (Romania) 2021 | Cancelled due to the COVID-19 pandemic in Europe | | | | | | | |
| (Slovakia) 2022 | Champions | 5 | 5 | 0 | 0 | 12 | 2 | Squad |
| (Malta) 2023 | Elite round | | | | | | | |
| (Northern Ireland) 2024 | Qualifying round | | | | | | | |
| (Romania) 2025 | Group stage | 3 | 0 | 2 | 1 | 9 | 11 | Squad |
| (Wales) 2026 | Elite Round | | | | | | | |
| (Czech Republic) 2027 | TBD | | | | | | | |
| (Bulgaria) 2028 | TBD | | | | | | | |
| (Netherlands) 2029 | TBD | | | | | | | |
| Total | 12/23 | 48 | 23 | 12 | 13 | 87 | 71 | |

== Fixtures and results 2025–26 season ==
Win Draw Loss Fixture

=== 2025 UEFA European Under-19 Championship ===
==== Final tournament ====
| 14 June 2025 Group stage | England | 2–2 | Norway | Ilie Oană Stadium, Ploiești |
| 15:00 | Watson 11'; Young (yellow card) 24'; King (yellow card) 60'; Moore 80' (pen.) | Report | Røssing-Lelesiit 18'; Granaas 45'; Øren (yellow card) 78' | Attendance: 1,433; Referee: Antoni Bandić (Bosnia and Herzegovina) |

| 17 June 2025 Group stage | England | 5–5 | Germany | Arcul de Triumf Stadium, Bucharest |
| 18:00 | King 35'; Wheatley 52'; Russell-Denny 55'; Abbott 61'; Derry 63' | Report | Darvich 7'; El Mala 31', 48'; Moerstedt 42'; Wurm 44' | Attendance: 1,104; Referee: Andrea Colombo (Italy) |

| 20 June 2025 Group stage | England | 2–4 | Netherlands | Rapid-Giulești Stadium, Bucharest |
| 18:00 | Wheatley 52'; Derry 90+3' | Report | Smit 22'; Redmond 35', 69'; Vennegoor of Hesselink 42' | Attendance: 738; Referee: Rob Hennessy (Ireland) |

=== 2026 UEFA European Under-19 Championship ===
==== Qualification ====
| 12 November 2025 Qualifying Round | Lithuania | 0–2 | England | Raudondvario stadionas, Raudondvaris |
| 16:00 | | Report | Mheuka 16' (pen.), 47' | Attendance: 487; Referee: Lothar D'hondt (Belgium) |

| 15 November 2025 Qualifying Round | England | 7–0 | Latvia | Raudondvario stadionas, Raudondvaris |
| 10:00 | Ngumoha 2'; Mukasa 11' (pen.), 73' (pen.); Derry 23', 53', 62'; Rigg 40' | Report | | Attendance: 157; Referee: Szabolcs Kovacs (Romania) |

| 18 November 2025 Qualifying Round | England | 4–0 | Scotland | Raudondvario stadionas, Raudondvaris |
| 10:00 | Mheuka 24', 29'; Rigg 58'; Fletcher 89' | Report | | Attendance: 73; Referee: Lothar D'hondt (Belgium) |

| 25 March 2026 Elite Qualifying Round | England | 0–2 | Serbia | Pista de Atletismo Gémeos Castro, Guimarães |
| 11:00 | | Report | Cvetković 39'; Kostić 65' | Referee: Jacob Karlsen (Denmark) |

| 28 March 2026 Elite Qualifying Round | England | 1–0 | Poland | Pista de Atletismo Gémeos Castro, Guimarães |
| 11:00 | Mheuka 86' | Report | | Referee: Jacob Karlsen (Denmark) |

| 31 March 2026 Elite Qualifying Round | Portugal | 0–6 | England | Estádio Amélia Morais, Braga |
| 16:00 | | Report | Derry 4', 60'; Dowman 50'; Mayers 75'; Mheuka 85'; Howell 88' | Referee: Christian-Petru Ciochirca (Austria) |

== Players ==
=== Latest squad ===
The following players were named in the squad for qualifying games against Slovenia, Belarus and Austria, played between 11–17 November 2026.

Caps and goals correct as of 5 October 2026, after the match against Belgium.

| No. | Pos. | Player | Date of birth (age) | Caps | Goals | Club |
|---|---|---|---|---|---|---|
| | GK | Freddy Bernal | 21 October 2008 (age 18) | 2 | 0 | (The Football Association) Chelsea |
| | GK | Finley Hooper | 19 February 2008 (age 18) | 1 | 0 | (The Football Association) West Ham United |
| | GK | Dylan Moody | 11 March 2008 (age 18) | 1 | 0 | (The Football Association) Southampton |
| | DF | Dean Benamar | 31 May 2007 (age 19) | 4 | 0 | (The Football Association) Crystal Palace |
| | DF | Kaden Braithwaite | 8 February 2008 (age 18) | 4 | 0 | (The Football Association) Manchester City |
| | DF | Dante Headley | 18 September 2008 (age 18) | 3 | 0 | (The Football Association) Manchester City |
| | DF | Malachi Hardy | 10 March 2008 (age 18) | 3 | 0 | (The Football Association) Tottenham Hotspur |
| | DF | Albert Mills | 28 February 2008 (age 18) | 2 | 0 | (The Football Association) Manchester United |
| | DF | Landon Emenalo | 18 January 2008 (age 18) | 0 | 0 | (Scottish Football Association) Celtic (on loan from Chelsea) |
| | DF | Yuel Helafu | 2 September 2008 (age 18) | 0 | 0 | (The Football Association) Manchester United |
| | MF | Harrison Miles | 28 September 2008 (age 18) | 4 | 0 | (The Football Association) Manchester City |
| | MF | Reggie Walsh | 20 October 2008 (age 18) | 4 | 0 | (The Football Association) Wigan Athletic (on loan from Chelsea) |
| | MF | Lucá Williams-Barnett | 1 October 2008 (age 18) | 4 | 2 | (The Football Association) Tottenham Hotspur |
| | MF | Louis Page | 10 July 2008 (age 18) | 3 | 0 | (The Football Association) Leicester City |
| | MF | Dexter Oliver | 2 December 2008 (age 17) | 0 | 0 | (The Football Association) Manchester City |
| | FW | Chizaram Ezenwata | 5 September 2008 (age 18) | 4 | 0 | (The Football Association) Chelsea |
| | FW | Reigan Heskey | 18 January 2008 (age 18) | 4 | 1 | (German Football Association) 1. FC Köln |
| | FW | Ryan McAidoo | 24 June 2008 (age 18) | 4 | 0 | (The Football Association) Manchester City |
| | FW | Harry Howell | 20 April 2008 (age 18) | 3 | 1 | (The Football Association) Leicester City (on loan from Brighton & Hove Albion) |
| | FW | Tynan Thompson | 17 April 2008 (age 18) | 1 | 0 | (The Football Association) Manchester United |
| | FW | Will Wright | 3 April 2008 (age 18) | 0 | 0 | (The Football Association) Liverpool |

==== Recent call-ups ====
The following players have previously been called up to the England under-19 squad and remain eligible.

| Pos. | Player | Date of birth (age) | Caps | Goals | Club | Latest call-up |
|---|---|---|---|---|---|---|
| GK | Owen Asemota | 12 April 2008 (age 18) | 0 | 0 | (England) Aston Villa | v. Lithuania, Latvia, Scotland, November 2025 |
| GK | Jack Porter | 15 July 2008 (age 18) | 1 | 0 | (England) Arsenal | v. Ukraine, Spain, Netherlands, September 2025 |
| DF | Wes Okoduwa | 12 May 2008 (age 18) | 6 | 0 | (England) Wolverhampton Wanderers | v. Republic of Ireland, Norway, United States, Belgium, September–October 2026 |
| DF | Freddie Simmonds | 9 March 2008 (age 18) | 2 | 0 | (England) AFC Wimbledon (on loan from Brighton & Hove Albion) | v. Republic of Ireland, Norway, United States, Belgium, September–October 2026 |
| DF | Stephen Mfuni | 12 February 2008 (age 18) | 17 | 0 | (England) Coventry City (on loan from Manchester City) | v. Lithuania, Latvia, Scotland, November 2025 |
| MF | Max Dowman | 31 December 2009 (age 16) | 13 | 3 | (England) Arsenal | v. Republic of Ireland, Norway, United States, Belgium, September–October 2026 |
| MF | Ife Ibrahim | 20 January 2008 (age 18) | 3 | 0 | (England) Arsenal | v. Republic of Ireland, Norway, United States, Belgium, September–October 2026 |
| MF | Bendito Mantato | 25 January 2008 (age 18) | 2 | 0 | (England) Manchester United | v. Republic of Ireland, Norway, United States, Belgium, September–October 2026 |
| FW | Alejandro Gomes Rodríguez | 11 March 2008 (age 18) | 4 | 1 | (France) Lyon | v. Republic of Ireland, Norway, United States, Belgium, September–October 2026 |
| FW | Harry Gray | 8 October 2009 (age 17) | 4 | 0 | (England) Sheffield Wednesday (on loan from Leeds United) | v. Republic of Ireland, Norway, United States, Belgium, September–October 2026 |
| FW | Rio Ngumoha | 29 August 2008 (age 18) | 11 | 1 | (England) Liverpool | v. Serbia, Poland, Portugal, March 2026 |
| FW | Jeremy Monga | 10 July 2009 (age 17) | 7 | 0 | (Wales) Swansea City (on loan from Manchester City) | v. Lithuania, Latvia, Scotland, November 2025 |

INJ Player withdrew from the squad before any games had been played.

== Honours ==
- UEFA European Under-19 Championship winners: (11) 1948, 1963, 1964, 1971, 1972, 1973, 1975, 1980, 1993, (Note: All tournaments prior to 2002 were contested by the under-18 team.) 2017, 2022
