= Shane van Aarle =

Dutch footballer (born 2006)

Personal information
- Date of birth: 5 August 2006 (age 20)
- Place of birth: Bakel, Netherlands
- Height: 1.96 m (6 ft 5 in)
- Position: Centre-back

Team information
- Current team: Juventus Next Gen
- Number: 4

Youth career
- Club Brugge
- 2021–2022: Royal Excel Mouscron
- 2022–2024: FC Eindhoven
- 2025–: Juventus

Senior career*
| Years | Team | Apps | (Gls) |
| 2024–2025 | FC Eindhoven | 18 | (0) |
| 2025– | Juventus Next Gen | 7 | (0) |

International career^{‡}
| 2025– | Netherlands U19 | 3 | (0) |
Medal record
Men's football
Representing Netherlands
UEFA European Under-19 Championship
| Winner | 2025 Romania |
- * Club domestic league appearances and goals as of 30 April 2026 ‡ National team caps and goals as of 16:46, 3 July 2025 (UTC)

Shane van Aarle (born 5 August 2006) is a Dutch professional footballer who plays as a centre-back for Serie C Group B club Juventus Next Gen.

== Club career ==
Van Aarle was raised in Wetteren, Belgium by his mother. He is a youth product of the Belgian clubs Club Brugge and Royal Excel Mouscron, before returning to the Netherlands with the youth academy of FC Eindhoven in 2022. On 9 December 2024, he debuted with FC Eindhoven in a 4–0 Eerste Divisie win over Jong Utrecht. On 14 May 2025, he transferred to Juventus Next Gen in the Serie C on a contract until 2029.

== International career ==
Born in the Netherlands, Van Aarle was born to a Dutch father and a Rwandan mother. He was part of the Netherlands U19s that won the 2025 UEFA European Under-19 Championship.

== Honours ==
Netherlands U19

- UEFA European Under-19 Championship: 2025
