= 2029 UEFA European Under-19 Championship =

Europees kampioenschap voetbal mannen onder 19 - 2029

Tournament details
- Host country: Netherlands
- Dates: Summer 2029
- Teams: 8 (from 1 confederation)

The 2029 UEFA European Under-19 Championship will be the 26th edition of the UEFA European Under-19 Championship (76th edition if the Under-18 and Junior era is also included), the annual international youth football championship organised by UEFA for the men's under-19 national teams of Europe. Netherlands, which were selected by UEFA on 3 December 2025, will host the tournament.

A total of 8 teams will play in the tournament, with players born on or after 1 January 2010 eligible to participate.

== Venues ==
Emmen	Volendam
De Oude Meerdijk	Kras Stadion
Capacity: 8,600	Capacity: 6,984
2029 UEFA European Under-19 Championship is located in Netherlands
Veendam	Almere
De Langeleegte; Capacity: 6,500	Yanmar Stadion; Capacity: 4,501

== Qualification ==
The following teams qualified for the final tournament.

Note: All appearance statistics include only U-19 era (since 2002).

Team	Method of qualification	Finals appearance	Last appearance	Previous best performance
Netherlands	Hosts	7th (may qualify in 2026, 2027 and 2028)	2025	Champions (2025)
