= Jon Martín =

Spanish footballer (born 2006)

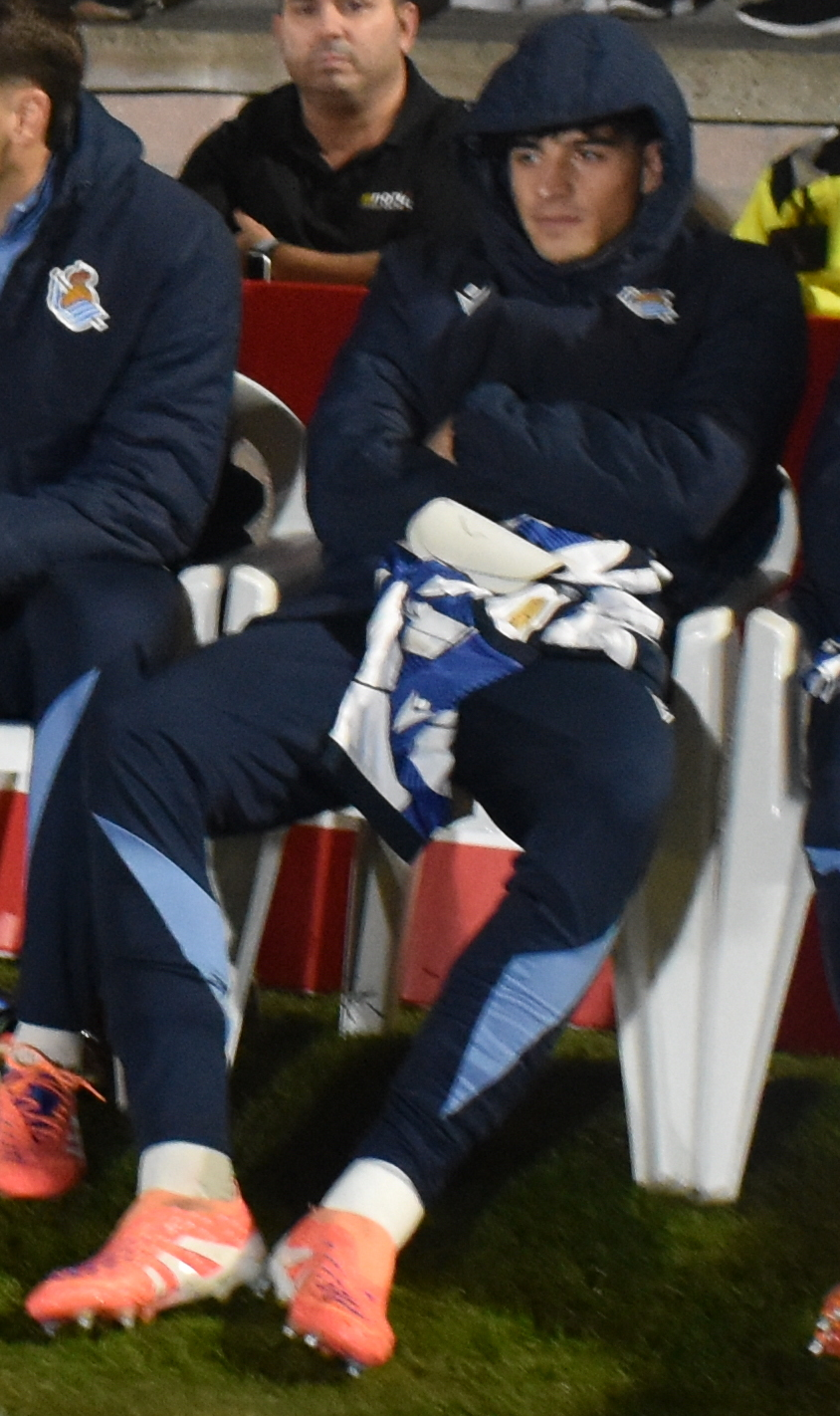
- Martín with Real Sociedad in 2025

Personal information
- Full name: Jon Martín Vicente
- Date of birth: 23 April 2006 (age 20)
- Place of birth: Lasarte-Oria, Spain
- Height: 1.86 m (6 ft 1 in)
- Position: Centre-back

Team information
- Current team: Real Sociedad
- Number: 6

Youth career
- 2018–2023: Real Sociedad
- 2022: → Beasain (loan)

Senior career*
Years	Team	Apps	(Gls)
2023	Real Sociedad C	3	(0)
2023–2025	Real Sociedad B	27	(2)
2024–	Real Sociedad	48	(3)

International career^{‡}
2022	Spain U16	1	(1)
2022–2023	Spain U17	17	(0)
2024	Spain U18	1	(0)
2024–2025	Spain U19	15	(2)
2024	Spain U20	2	(0)
2025–	Spain U21	4	(0)
2026–	Spain	1	(0)
Medal record
Men's football
Representing Spain
UEFA European Under-19 Championship
Runner-up	2025 Romania
- * Club domestic league appearances and goals as of 25 October 2026 (UTC) ‡ National team caps and goals as of 4 June 2026 (UTC)

Jon Martín Vicente (born 23 April 2006) is a Spanish professional footballer who plays as a centre-back for Real Sociedad and the Spain national team.

== Early life ==
Martín was born on 23 April 2006 in Lasarte-Oria (near San Sebastián), Spain. His father Xanti Martín was also a footballer and a centre-back.

== Club career ==
As a youth player, Martín joined the youth academy of La Liga side Real Sociedad and was sent on loan to the youth academy of Beasain in 2022. In 2023, he was promoted to the club's C team before being promoted to their reserve team the same year. On 11 October 2023, he was named by English newspaper The Guardian as one of the best players born in 2006 worldwide. One year later, he was promoted to their senior team. On 19 May 2024, he debuted for them during a 2–0 away win over Real Betis in the league.

== Style of play ==
Martín plays as a centre-back and is right-footed. Spanish news website Onda Vasca wrote in 2025 that he "has excellent heading ability... often finishes off many set pieces... [has] refined technique for playing the ball".

== Career statistics ==
=== Club ===
As of match played 25 October 2026

Appearances and goals by club, season and competition
Club	Season	League			Copa del Rey		Europe		Other		Total	
Club	Season	Division	Apps	Goals	Apps	Goals	Apps	Goals	Apps	Goals	Apps	Goals
Real Sociedad C	2022–23	Segunda Federación	3	0	—		—		—		3	0
Real Sociedad B	2023–24	Primera Federación	26	2	—		—		—		26	2
Real Sociedad B	2024–25	Primera Federación	1	0	—		—		—		1	0
Real Sociedad B	Total		27	2	—		—		—		27	2
Real Sociedad	2023–24	La Liga	1	0	0	0	—		—		1	0
Real Sociedad	2024–25	La Liga	13	0	1	0	3 (Note: Appearances in UEFA Europa League)	0	—		17	0
Real Sociedad	2025–26	La Liga	25	2	7	0	—		—		32	2
Real Sociedad	2026–27	La Liga	9	1	0	0	3	0	0	0	12	1
Real Sociedad	Total		48	3	8	0	6	0	0	0	62	3
Career total			78	5	8	0	6	0	0	0	92	5

=== International ===
As of match played 4 June 2026

Appearances and goals by national team and year
National team	Year	Apps	Goals
Spain	2026	1	0
Total		1	0

== Honours ==
Real Sociedad

- Copa del Rey: 2025–26

Spain U19

- UEFA European Under-19 Championship runner-up: 2025

Individual

- UEFA European Under-19 Championship Team of the Tournament: 2025
