= Dani Muñoz =

Spanish footballer (born 2006)

Personal information
- Full name: Daniel Muñoz Navas
- Date of birth: 19 July 2006 (age 20)
- Place of birth: Estepona, Spain
- Height: 1.70 m (5 ft 7 in)
- Position: Left-back

Team information
- Current team: Iraklis
- Number: 23

Youth career
- CD Estepona
- –2018: Málaga CF
- 2018–2026: Atlético Madrid

Senior career*
| Years | Team | Apps | (Gls) |
| 2025–2026 | Atlético Madrid C | 14 | (1) |
| 2025–2026 | Atlético Madrid B | 1 | (0) |
| 2026– | Iraklis | 1 | (0) |

International career^{‡}
| 2021–2022 | Spain U16 | 10 | (0) |
| 2022–2023 | Spain U17 | 11 | (0) |
| 2023 | Spain U18 | 2 | (0) |
| 2024–2025 | Spain U19 | 23 | (1) |
Medal record
Men's football
Representing Spain
UEFA European Under-19 Championship
| Winner | 2024 Northern Ireland |
| Runner-up | 2025 Romania |
- * Club domestic league appearances and goals as of 22:00, 29 August 2026 ‡ National team caps and goals as of 26 June 2025

Daniel Muñoz Navas (born 19 July 2006) is a Spanish professional footballer who plays as a left-back for Super League Greece club Iraklis.

He has represented Spain at various youth levels, and was part of the squad that won the 2024 UEFA European Under-19 Championship.

== Club career ==
Muñoz began his football career at his hometown club CD Estepona before joining Málaga CF's youth setup. During his time at Málaga, he won the Andalusian regional title and participated in the LaLiga Promises youth tournament.

In 2018, he transferred to Atlético Madrid, where he was placed in the Cadete A squad, a category one year above his age group. He progressed through the club’s youth ranks, renewed his contract with Atlético Madrid in 2020, extending his stay until 2025.

Later again in 2024, Muñoz extending his contract with Atlético Madrid to 2027.

On 15 July 2026, Muñoz signed for Greek club Iraklis on a free transfer.

== International career ==
Muñoz made his debut for Spain at the under-16 level in September 2021 in a friendly against Russia, under manager David Gordo. He was called up for the 2023 UEFA European Under-17 Championship under coach Julen Guerrero, and later that year participated in the 2023 FIFA U-17 World Cup hosted in Indonesia under coach José Lana.

In 2024, Muñoz was selected for the UEFA European Under-19 Championship held in Northern Ireland, and was the youngest player in the squad. He later won the tournament as Spain defeating France 2–0 in the final.

He was also called up for the 2025 edition of the UEFA European Under-19 Championship in Romania, where Spain finished as runner-up, and was named in the Team of the Tournament.

== Career statistics ==
As of 25 January 2026

Appearances and goals by club, season and competition
| Club | Season | League | | | Other | | Total | |
| Club | Season | Division | Apps | Goals | Apps | Goals | Apps | Goals |
|---|---|---|---|---|---|---|---|---|
| Atlético Madrid C | 2025–26 | Tercera Federación | 14 | 1 | — | | 14 | 1 |
| Atlético Madrileño | 2025–26 | Primera Federación | 1 | 0 | — | | 1 | 0 |
| Career total | | | 15 | 1 | 0 | 0 | 15 | 1 |

== Honours ==
Spain U19

- UEFA European Under-19 Championship: 2024; runner-up: 2025

Individual

- UEFA European Under-19 Championship Team of the Tournament: 2025
