= Givairo Read =

Dutch footballer (born 2006)

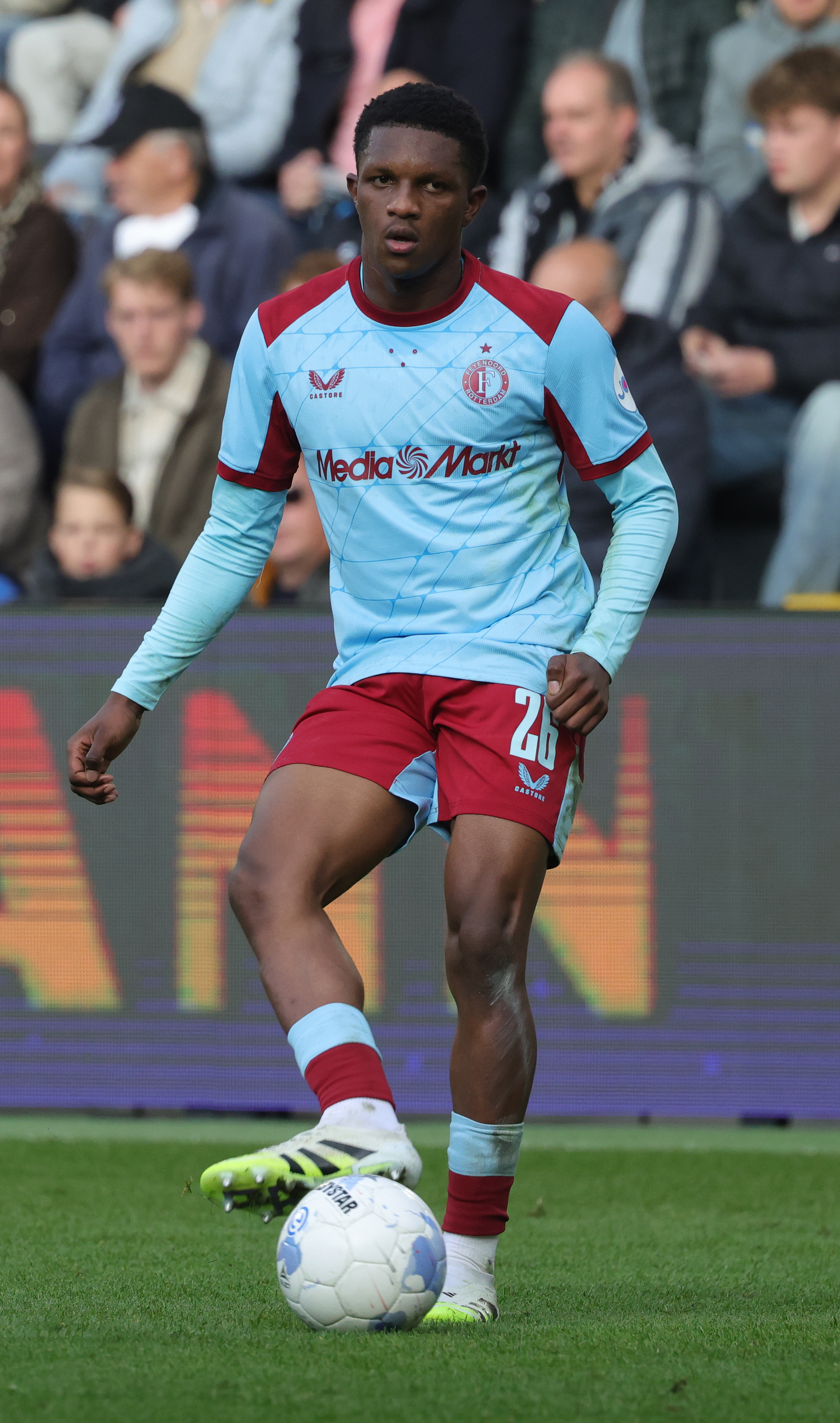
- Read in 2025 with Feyenoord

Personal information
- Birth name: Givairo Dundas
- Date of birth: 2 June 2006 (age 20)
- Place of birth: Amsterdam, Netherlands
- Height: 1.75 m (5 ft 9 in)
- Position: Right-back

Team information
- Current team: Feyenoord
- Number: 26

Youth career
- –2017: Zeeburgia
- 2017–2023: FC Volendam
- 2023–2025: Feyenoord

Senior career*
Years	Team	Apps	(Gls)
2022–2023	Jong Volendam	35	(2)
2022–2023	FC Volendam	1	(0)
2023–	Feyenoord	54	(3)

International career^{‡}
2022–2023	Netherlands U17	6	(0)
2023–2025	Netherlands U19	19	(2)
2025–	Netherlands U21	6	(1)
Medal record
Men's football
Representing Netherlands
UEFA European Under-19 Championship
Winner	2025 Romania
- * Club domestic league appearances and goals as of 02:10, 18 November 2026 (UTC) ‡ National team caps and goals as of 02:10, 18 November 2026 (UTC)

Givairo Read (né Givairo Dundas; born 2 June 2006) is a Dutch professional footballer who plays as a right-back for Eredivisie club Feyenoord.

== Club career ==
=== FC Volendam ===
Read started his football career with AVV Zeeburgia and moved to the academy of FC Volendam in the summer of 2017. In FC Volendam's academy, he started in the under-12 team and played at several positions. He made his debut for Jong Volendam in the Tweede Divisie in a 2–0 win against ASWH on 19 March 2022. By doing so, he became the youngest ever player to play for Jong Volendam at the Dutch third level, at an age of 15 years and 290 days. He scored in injury-time in a 2–1 defeat to IJsselmeervogels a week later, becoming the youngest ever goalscorer in the competition. Jong Volendam eventually managed to stay up in the Tweede Divisie after beating Jong Almere City in play-offs against relegation.

On 17 March 2023, Read made his first-team debut, replacing Derry Murkin in the final minutes of a 2–1 win against Fortuna Sittard in the Eredivisie. Jong Volendam relegated from the Tweede Divisie to the under-21 Division.

=== Feyenoord ===
==== 2023–2025: Breakthrough ====
On 6 June 2023, it was announced that Read rejected an offer from FC Volendam and signed a three-year contract with Feyenoord, where he would play for the under-18 team. He was convinced to make the move by Robin van Persie. He was named Most Valuable Player at the friendly Mladen Ramljak Memorial Tournament in August 2023, with Feyenoord beating Manchester United in the final. He was named Academy Player of the Month at Feyenoord for his performances in August 2023. Read scored on his UEFA Youth League debut in a 3–0 win over Celtic on 19 September 2023. He travelled with the first team for a training camp in Marbella in January 2024. On 15 February 2024, Read made his debut for Feyenoord's first team, as a substitute for Bart Nieuwkoop in a 1–1 draw against AS Roma in the UEFA Europa League knockout round play-offs.

Read replaced Marcos López as Feyenoord won the Johan Cruyff Shield on penalties against PSV on 4 August 2024. On 13 September 2024, he extended his contract at Feyenoord by two years, until mid-2028. He made his league debut for Feyenoord nine days later, as a substitute for Igor Paixão in a 2–0 win against NAC Breda. His full debut followed on 27 October 2024, in a 0–2 league win against FC Utrecht. Real scored his first goal for Feyenoord on 15 January 2025, contributing to a 1–4 win against Rijnsburgse Boys in the KNVB Cup. After being added to Feyenoord's UEFA Champions League squad for the knockout phase, Read made his debut in the competition as a starter during a 1–0 win against Milan on 12 February 2025. Following his performance, he was included in the competition's Team of the Week along with Paixão. He received his first red card in professional football just after the second leg six days later finished in a 1–1 draw.

After Bart Nieuwkoop and Jordan Lotomba suffered injuries, Read became Feyenoord's main right-back. In a 2–6 win against FC Twente on 16 March 2025, he became the youngest player to assist three goals in a single Eredivisie game since Wesley Sneijder in 2003. On 2 April 2025, it was announced that Feyenoord and Read reached an agreement in principle for a contract extension of a year, to mid-2029. The contract was signed on 17 April 2025. For his performances in April 2025, including an assist against Groningen and clean sheets against AZ, Fortuna Sittard and PEC Zwolle, Read was named Johan Cruyff Talent of the Month and, along with teammates Paixão and Timon Wellenreuther, included in the Team of the Month in the Eredivisie. He scored his first Eredivisie goal on 3 May 2025, during a 1–4 win against Heracles Almelo.

==== 2025–present ====
Ahead of the 2025–26 season, Read was picked by head coach Van Persie as Feyenoord's third captain, behind Sem Steijn and Anis Hadj Moussa. On 23 October 2025, he scored his first goal in international football, equalising in a 3–1 win against Panathinaikos in the UEFA Europa League league phase. During a 2–1 defeat to Go Ahead Eagles on 9 November 2025, Read suffered an injury which kept him sidelined for the remainder of the calendar year. The International Centre for Sports Studies (CIES) calculated Read to be the best player born since 2006 not active in a big-5 league in December 2025. On his return from injury, against Heerenveen on 11 January 2026, he suffered another injury, keeping him sidelined for 6 weeks. Read made his return as a substitute for Jordan Bos during a 3–1 league win over FC Groningen on 25 April 2026. A week later, he scored a late winning goal in the away game against Fortuna Sittard (1–2), which helped Feyenoord's successful bid to finish in second place in the Eredivisie, qualifying for the 2026–27 UEFA Champions League.

In the summer of 2026, Feyenoord was reported to have rejected multiple bids on Read from Nottingham Forest and Roma. On 13 September 2026, Read delivered three assists as Feyenoord beat PEC Zwolle 0–7. A week later, he delivered another assist in a 5–0 win against FC Utrecht, becoming the first defender in the 21st century to record 13 assists in his first 50 Eredivisie matches. For his performances in September 2026, he was named Johan Cruyff Talent of the Month in the Eredivisie for a second time. He was also included in the Eredivisie Team of the Month, along with team mates Nacho Ferri, Anis Hadj Moussa and Gjivai Zechiël.

== International career ==
In September 2022, Read was called up for the Netherlands under-17 team. He made his debut in a 3–0 win against the Republic of Ireland on 23 September 2022. On 28 March 2023, he started in a UEFA Under-17 Euro qualifier against England. With a 1–0 win, the Netherlands qualified for the final tournament in Hungary. Read missed the final tournament due to an injury. He made his debut for the Netherlands under-19 in a friendly against Switzerland on 12 October 2023 and scored his first goal for that team in a friendly against Scotland on 9 September 2024. On 25 March 2025, Read captained the team in a 4–0 win against the Czech Republic that secured qualification for the European Under-19 Championship in Romania later that year.

Ahead of the final tournament, Read rejected an offer from Netherlands under-21 head coach Michael Reiziger to join the under-21 team at the European Under-21 Championship, having heard that Reiziger would prefer Devyne Rensch as right-back. Instead, he was included in the Dutch squad for the European Under-19 Championship by head coach Peter van de Veen on 30 May 2026. After he missed the first game due to suspension, Read captained the Netherlands in every other game at the tournament. During the final against holders Spain, Read's cross led to an own goal by Raúl Jiménez. It was the only goal of the game as the Netherlands won the tournament for the first time. Read was subsequently named in the Team of the Tournament by the UEFA, along with team-mates Joeri Heerkens, Dies Janse, Kees Smit and Tygo Land.

On 3 October 2025, Read was called up for the Netherlands under-21 team by Reiziger for the first time, for the Euro qualifier against Bosnia and Herzegovina and a friendly against Lithuania. He made his debut for the team in a goalless draw against Bosnia and Herzegovina on 10 October 2025. In his second game for the team, a goalless draw against Norway on 25 September 2026, he was the team's captain. In November 2026, he captained his side to qualify for the final tournament, scoring his first goal for the team in the play-offs against Denmark.

== Personal life ==
Read was born Givairo Dundas, but his last name changed to his father's after his parents married. He has one older brother and two younger sisters. He was born in Bos en Lommer, moved to his father in Suriname at an age of six months and returned to the Netherlands two years later, where he grew up in Amsterdam-Zuidoost. Read went to school at the Don Bosco College and obtained his VMBO-T diploma. In January 2025, he said he supported Liverpool and Barcelona. However, in October 2025, he stated that he "does not really watch football."

== Career statistics ==
As of match played 8 November 2026

Appearances and goals by club, season and competition
Club	Season	League			National cup		Europe		Other		Total	
Club	Season	Division	Apps	Goals	Apps	Goals	Apps	Goals	Apps	Goals	Apps	Goals
Jong Volendam	2021–22	Tweede Divisie	11	1	—		—		1 (Note: Appearance in Tweede Divisie U21 promotion/relegation play-offs)	0	12	1
Jong Volendam	2022–23	Tweede Divisie	24	1	—		—		—		24	1
Jong Volendam	Total		35	2	0	0	0	0	1	0	36	2
FC Volendam	2022–23	Eredivisie	1	0	0	0	—		—		1	0
Feyenoord	2023–24	Eredivisie	0	0	0	0	1 (Note: Appearance in UEFA Europa League)	0	0	0	1	0
Feyenoord	2024–25	Eredivisie	26	2	3	1	3 (Note: Appearances in UEFA Champions League)	0	1 (Note: Appearance in Johan Cruyff Shield)	0	33	3
Feyenoord	2025–26	Eredivisie	16	1	0	0	4 (Note: One appearance in UEFA Champions League, three appearances and one goal in UEFA Europa League)	1	—		20	2
Feyenoord	2026–27	Eredivisie	12	0	0	0	4	0	—		16	0
Feyenoord	Total		54	3	3	1	12	1	1	0	70	5
Career total			90	5	3	1	12	1	2	0	107	7

== Honours ==
Feyenoord

- KNVB Cup: 2023–24
- Johan Cruyff Shield: 2024

Netherlands U19

- UEFA European Under-19 Championship: 2025

Individual

- Johan Cruyff Talent of the Month: April 2025, September 2026
- Eredivisie Team of the Month: April 2025, September 2026
- UEFA Champions League Team of the Week: 2024–25 knockout phase play-offs first legs
- UEFA European Under-19 Championship Team of the Tournament: 2025
