= Izan Merino =

Spanish footballer (born 2006)

Personal information
- Full name: Izan Merino Rodríguez
- Date of birth: 15 April 2006 (age 20)
- Place of birth: Málaga, Spain
- Height: 1.82 m (6 ft 0 in)
- Position: Defensive midfielder

Team information
- Current team: Málaga
- Number: 23

Youth career
- 2015–2020: Málaga
- 2020–2021: San Félix
- 2021–2023: Málaga

Senior career*
Years	Team	Apps	(Gls)
2022–2024	Málaga B	29	(0)
2023–	Málaga	65	(0)

International career^{‡}
2023	Spain U17	5	(0)
2024	Spain U18	5	(0)
2024–2025	Spain U19	12	(1)
2025	Spain U20	4	(0)
Medal record
Men's football
Representing Spain
UEFA European Under-19 Championship
Runner-up	2025 Romania
- * Club domestic league appearances and goals as of 19 August 2026 ‡ National team caps and goals as of 11 October 2025

Izan Merino Rodríguez (born 15 April 2006) is a Spanish footballer who plays for Primera División club Málaga CF. Mainly a defensive midfielder, he can also play as a centre-back.

== Club career ==
Born in Málaga, Andalusia, Merino joined Málaga CF's youth setup in 2015, aged nine. He made his senior debut with the reserves on 16 October 2022, starting in a 1–1 Tercera Federación home draw against FC Málaga City.

Merino made his first team debut on 6 December 2023, starting in a 1–0 home win over CD Eldense, for the season's Copa del Rey. He featured in five Primera Federación matches in the remainder of the campaign, as his side achieved promotion to Segunda División.

Merino made his professional debut on 17 August 2024, coming on as a late substitute for Juanpe in a 2–2 away draw against Racing de Ferrol. The following 20 May, he renewed his contract until 2028.

Regularly used during the 2025–26 season, Merino contributed with 39 appearances overall as the club achieved another promotion to La Liga. He made his top tier debut on 19 August 2026, starting in a 2–0 away loss to Atlético Madrid.

== International career ==
Merino is a Spain youth international. He was included in the Spain U17 squad for the 2023 UEFA European Under-17 Championship in Hungary, and in October of the same year was selected for the 2023 FIFA U-17 World Cup in Indonesia. He has also represented Spain at under-18 level in friendly matches.

Merino later received a call-up to the Spain U19 for the 2025 UEFA European Under-19 Championship in Romania. He was a regular starter throughout the tournament, scoring in the group-stage match against Denmark. He also played the full 120 minutes in the semi-final against Germany, which Spain won 6–5 after extra time. He started in the final, where Spain were defeated 1–0 by the Netherlands and finished as runners-up.

In September 2025, Merino was called up to the Spain U20 squad for the FIFA U-20 World Cup in Chile. He started in the quarter-final match against Colombia, which ended in a 3–2 defeat and Spain’s elimination from the tournament.

== Career statistics ==
As of match played 21 December 2025

Appearances and goals by club, season and competition
Club	Season	League			Copa del Rey		Europe		Other		Total	
Club	Season	Division	Apps	Goals	Apps	Goals	Apps	Goals	Apps	Goals	Apps	Goals
Málaga B	2022–23	Tercera Federación	10	0	—		—		2 (Note: Appearance in 2023 Tercera Federación play-offs)	0	12	0
Málaga B	2023–24	Tercera Federación	19	0	—		—		2 (Note: Appearance in 2024 Tercera Federación play-offs)	0	21	0
Málaga B	Total		29	0	0	0	0	0	4	0	33	0
Málaga CF	2023–24	Primera Federación	5	0	1	0	—		—		6	0
Málaga CF	2024–25	Segunda División	25	0	1	0	—		—		26	0
Málaga CF	2025–26	Segunda División	12	0	1	0	—		—		13	0
Málaga CF	Total		42	0	3	0	0	0	0	0	45	0
Career total			71	0	3	0	0	0	4	0	78	0

== Honours ==
Spain U19

- UEFA European Under-19 Championship runner-up: 2025
