= 2025 UEFA European Under-19 Championship =

Campionatul European de Fotbal Sub-19 2025

Tournament details
- Host country: Romania
- Dates: 13–26 June 2025
- Teams: 8 (from 1 confederation)
- Venues: 4 (in 3 host cities)

Final positions
- Champions: Netherlands (1st title)
- Runners-up: Spain

Tournament statistics
- Matches played: 15
- Goals scored: 65 (4.33 per match)
- Attendance: 40,278 (2,685 per match)
- Top scorer(s): (Germany) Said El Mala (Germany) Max Moerstedt (Netherlands) Kees Smit (Spain) Pablo García (4 goals each)
- Best player: (Netherlands) Kees Smit

The 2025 UEFA European Under-19 Championship was the 22nd edition of the UEFA European Under-19 Championship (72nd edition if the Under-18 and Junior era is also included), the annual international youth football championship organised by UEFA for the men's under-19 national teams of Europe. Romania, which were selected by UEFA on 19 April 2021, hosted the tournament. A total of eight teams played in the tournament, with players born on or after 1 January 2006 eligible to participate.

== Venues ==
Bucharest		Ploiești
Rapid-Giulești Stadium	Arcul de Triumf Stadium	Ilie Oană Stadium
Capacity: 14,047	Capacity: 8,027	Capacity: 15,073
Voluntari	2025 UEFA European Under-19 Championship is located in Romania	
Anghel Iordănescu Stadium	2025 UEFA European Under-19 Championship is located in Romania	
Capacity: 4,600	2025 UEFA European Under-19 Championship is located in Romania	

== Qualification ==
=== Qualified teams ===
The following teams qualified for the final tournament.

Note: All appearance statistics include only U-19 era (since 2002).

Team	Method of qualification	Finals appearance	Last appearance	Previous best performance
Romania	Hosts	3rd	2022	Group stage (2011, 2022)
Germany	Elite round Group 6 winners	10th	2017	Champions (2008, 2014)
Spain	Elite round Group 5 winners	15th	2024	Champions (2002, 2004, 2006, 2007, 2011, 2012, 2015, 2019, 2024)
Denmark	Elite round Group 1 winners	2nd	2024	Group stage (2024)
Montenegro	Elite round Group 2 winners	1st	Debut	
Netherlands	Elite round Group 3 winners	6th	2017	Semi-finals (2017)
Norway	Elite round Group 4 winners	8th	2024	Semi-finals (2023)
England	Elite round Group 7 winners	12th	2022	Champions (2017, 2022)

== Squads ==
Each national team submitted a squad of 20 players, two of whom had to be goalkeepers. Players born on or after 1 January 2006 are eligible to participate. The age listed for each player is their age as of 13 June 2025, the first day of the tournament.

== Group stage ==
The group winners and runners-up advanced to the semi-finals.

Tie-breaking criteria for group play
The ranking of teams in the group stage is determined as follows:
1. Points obtained in all group matches;
2. Points in head-to-head matches among tied teams;
3. Goal difference in head-to-head matches among tied teams;
4. Goals scored in head-to-head matches among tied teams;
5. If more than two teams are tied, and after applying all head-to-head criteria above, a subset of teams are still tied, all head-to-head criteria above are reapplied exclusively to this subset of teams;
6. Goal difference in all group matches;
7. Goals scored in all group matches;
8. Penalty shoot-out if only two teams have the same number of points, and they met in the last round of the group and are tied after applying all criteria above (not used if more than two teams have the same number of points, or if their rankings are not relevant for qualification for the next stage);
9. Disciplinary points
  - Yellow card: −1 point;
  - Indirect red card (second yellow card): −3 points;
  - Direct red card: −3 points;
10. UEFA coefficient for the qualifying round draw;
11. Drawing of lots.

=== Group A ===
Pos	Team	Pld	W	D	L	GF	GA	GD	Pts	Qualification
1	Spain	3	3	0	0	9	1	+8	9	Knockout stage
2	Romania (H)	3	2	0	1	6	4	+2	6	Knockout stage
3	Denmark	3	1	0	2	5	4	+1	3	
4	Montenegro	3	0	0	3	1	12	−11	0	

Source: UEFA
Rules for classification: Group stage tiebreakers
(H) Hosts
13 June 2025
18:00

Spain	1–0	Denmark
Buur 45' (o.g.)	Report

Rapid-Giulești Stadium, Bucharest
Attendance: 731
Referee: Lothar D'hondt (Belgium)
13 June 2025
21:00

Romania	2–1	Montenegro
Marincău 63'; Barbu 90'	Report	Vlahović 13'

Arcul de Triumf Stadium, Bucharest
Attendance: 2,934
Referee: Menélaos Andoníou (Cyprus)

16 June 2025
18:00

Denmark	5–0	Montenegro
Berthelsen 9'; Themsen 32', 52'; Agyekum 68', 74'	Report

Rapid-Giulești Stadium, Bucharest
Attendance: 389
Referee: Antoni Bandić (Bosnia and Herzegovina)
16 June 2025
21:00

Romania	1–3	Spain
Szimionaș 49'	Report	Cordero 3'; Martín 67'; Monserrate 73'

Anghel Iordănescu Stadium, Voluntari
Attendance: 3,764
Referee: Rob Hennessy (Ireland)

19 June 2025
20:00

Denmark	0–3	Romania
	Report	Guțea 34'; Barbu 58'; Vermeșan 77'

Arcul de Triumf Stadium, Bucharest
Attendance: 6,133
Referee: Andrea Colombo (Italy)
19 June 2025
20:00

Montenegro	0–5	Spain
	Report	Junyent 14', 28', 65'; Virgili 16'; Huestamendia 35'

Ilie Oană Stadium, Ploiești
Attendance: 1,594
Referee: Menélaos Andoníou (Cyprus)

=== Group B ===
Pos	Team	Pld	W	D	L	GF	GA	GD	Pts	Qualification
1	Netherlands	3	3	0	0	9	2	+7	9	Knockout stage
2	Germany	3	1	1	1	7	9	−2	4	Knockout stage
3	England	3	0	2	1	9	11	−2	2	
4	Norway	3	0	1	2	3	6	−3	1	

Source: UEFA
Rules for classification: Group stage tiebreakers
14 June 2025
17:00

England	2–2	Norway
Watson 11'; Moore 80' (pen.)	Report	Røssing-Lelesiit 18'; Granaas 45'

Ilie Oană Stadium, Ploiești
Attendance: 1,433
Referee: Antoni Bandić (Bosnia and Herzegovina)
14 June 2025
20:00

Germany	0–3	Netherlands
	Report	Oufkir 43', 90+1'; Smit 90+4'

Anghel Iordănescu Stadium, Voluntari
Attendance: 783
Referee: Javier Alberola Rojas (Spain)

17 June 2025
17:00

Norway	0–2	Netherlands
	Report	Smit 65'; Konadu 83'

Ilie Oană Stadium, Ploiești
Attendance: 683
Referee: Lothar D'hondt (Belgium)
17 June 2025
20:00

Germany	5–5	England
Darvich 7'; El Mala 31', 48'; Moerstedt 42'; Wurm 44'	Report	King 35'; Wheatley 52'; Russell-Denny 55'; Abbott 61'; Derry 63'

Arcul de Triumf Stadium, Bucharest
Attendance: 1,104
Referee: Andrea Colombo (Italy)

20 June 2025
20:00

Norway	1–2	Germany
Granaas 72'	Report	Ouédraogo 85'; El Mala 90+1'

Anghel Iordănescu Stadium, Voluntari
Attendance: 312
Referee: Javier Alberola Rojas (Spain)
20 June 2025
20:00

Netherlands	4–2	England
Smit 22'; Redmond 35', 69'; Vennegoor of Hesselink 42'	Report	Wheatley 52'; Derry 90+3'

Rapid-Giulești Stadium, Bucharest
Attendance: 738
Referee: Rob Hennessy (Ireland)

== Knockout stage ==
In the knockout stage, extra time and penalty shoot-out were used to decide the winners if necessary.

=== Bracket ===
Semi-finals
23 June – Bucharest (Arcul de Triumf)
Spain (a.e.t.)	6
Germany	5
23 June – Bucharest (Rapid-Giulești)
Netherlands	3
Romania	1

Final
26 June – Bucharest (Rapid-Giulești)
Spain	0
Netherlands	1

=== Semi-finals ===
23 June 2025
18:00

Spain	6–5 (a.e.t.)	Germany
García 61', 90+1', 90+5', 119'; Marqués 97'; Virgili 113'	Report	Moerstedt 28', 104', 107'; El Mala 78'; Cuenca 90+9' (o.g.)

Arcul de Triumf Stadium, Bucharest
Attendance: 1,322
Referee: Lothar D'hondt (Belgium)

23 June 2025
21:00

Netherlands	3–1	Romania
Konadu 36'; Smit 42'; Sliti 53'	Report	Barbu 68'

Rapid-Giulești Stadium, Bucharest
Attendance: 12,199
Referee: Andrea Colombo (Italy)

=== Final ===
26 June 2025
21:00

Spain	0–1	Netherlands
	Report	Jiménez 63' (o.g.)

Rapid-Giulești Stadium, Bucharest
Attendance: 6,159
Referee: Rob Hennessy (Ireland)

== Goalscorers ==
There were 65 goals scored in 15 matches, for an average of 4.33 goals per match.

4 goals

- (Germany) Said El Mala
- (Germany) Max Moerstedt
- (Netherlands) Kees Smit
- (Spain) Pablo García

3 goals

- (Romania) David Barbu
- (Spain) Quim Junyent

2 goals

- (Denmark) Jonathan Agyekum
- (Denmark) Mike Themsen
- (England) Jesse Derry
- (England) Ethan Wheatley
- (Netherlands) Don-Angelo Konadu
- (Netherlands) Ayoub Oufkir
- (Netherlands) Zépiqueno Redmond
- (Norway) Sondre Granaas
- (Spain) Jan Virgili

1 goal

- (Denmark) Villum Berthelsen
- (England) Zach Abbott
- (England) Joshua King
- (England) Mikey Moore
- (England) Reiss-Alexander Russell-Denny
- (England) Tom Watson
- (Germany) Noah Darvich
- (Germany) Assan Ouédraogo
- (Germany) Leopold Wurm
- (Montenegro) Vuk Vlahović
- (Netherlands) Aymen Sliti
- (Netherlands) Lucas Vennegoor of Hesselink
- (Norway) Alexander Røssing-Lelesiit
- (Romania) Remus Guțea
- (Romania) Emanuel Marincău
- (Romania) Luca Szimionaș
- (Romania) Ioan Vermeșan
- (Spain) Antonio Cordero
- (Spain) Peio Huestamendia
- (Spain) Jon Martín
- (Spain) Tommy Marqués
- (Spain) Jano Monserrate

1 own goal

- (Denmark) Oscar Buur (against Spain)
- (Spain) Andrés Cuenca (against Germany)
- (Spain) Raúl Jiménez (against the Netherlands)

Source: UEFA

== Team of the Tournament ==
The UEFA Technical Observer team announced the team of the tournament.

Goalkeeper	Defenders	Midfielders	Forwards
(Netherlands) Joeri Heerkens	(Netherlands) Givairo Read; (Spain) Jon Martín; (Netherlands) Dies Janse; (Spain) Dani Muñoz	(Germany) Winners Osawe; (Netherlands) Kees Smit; (Netherlands) Tygo Land	(Spain) Pablo García; (Germany) Max Moerstedt; (Germany) Said El Mala
