= Reiss-Alexander Russell-Denny =

English footballer (born 2006)

Personal information
- Date of birth: May 11, 2006 (age 20)
- Place of birth: Reading, England
- Height: 1.78 m (5 ft 10 in)
- Position: Midfielder

Team information
- Current team: Bristol Rovers, on loan from Tottenham Hotspur
- Number: 8

Youth career
- 2014–2025: Chelsea
- 2025–2026: Tottenham Hotspur

Senior career*
| Years | Team | Apps | (Gls) |
| 2026– | Tottenham Hotspur | 0 | (0) |
| 2026– | →Bristol Rovers (loan) | 11 | (1) |

International career^{‡}
| 2023 | England U17 | 3 | (2) |
| 2023–2024 | England U18 | 6 | (0) |
| 2024–2025 | England U19 | 9 | (1) |
- * Club domestic league appearances and goals as of 12:52, 23 August 2026 (BST) ‡ National team caps and goals as of 01:24, 14 August 2026 (UTC)

Reiss-Alexander Russell-Denny (born 11 May 2006) is an English footballer who plays as a central midfielder for EFL League Two club Bristol Rovers, on loan from Tottenham Hotspur.

== Club career ==
Russell-Denny joined Chelsea's youth academy as a U8, and worked his way up all their youth levels. In February 2025, he moved to Tottenham Hotspur. On 7 August 2026, he joined Bristol Rovers on a season-long loan in the EFL League Two. He made his senior and professional debut with Bristol Rovers as a substitute in a 1–0 EFL Cup loss to Peterborough United on 8 August 2026.

== International career ==
Russell-Denny is a youth international for England. He played for the England U17s at the 2023 FIFA U-17 World Cup. He was called up to the England U19s for the 2025 UEFA European Under-19 Championship.
