= Spain national under-20 football team =

National under-20 association football team

Spain U-20
- Nickname: La Rojita (The Little Red One)
- Association: Royal Spanish Football Federation (Real Federación Española de Fútbol – RFEF)
- Confederation: UEFA (Europe)
- Most caps: Pablo Couñago; Jaime Gavilán; Francisco Jusué (13 each)
- Top scorer: Adrián (5)
- FIFA code: ESP
First colours	Second colours

First international
- Spain 2–1 France (Radès, Tunisia; 28 June 1977)

Biggest win
- Spain 8–0 Tahiti (Cairo, Egypt; 25 September 2009)

Biggest defeat
- Argentina 3–0 Spain (Doha, Qatar; 25 April 1995); Brazil 3–0 Spain (Montevideo, Uruguay; February 1, 1998) Records for competitive matches only.

FIFA U-20 World Cup
- Appearances: 16 (first in 1977)
- Best result: Winners (1999)

Spain national under-20 football team
Medal record

U-20 World Cup
Silver medal – second place	1985 Soviet Union	Team
Gold medal – first place	1999 Nigeria	Team
Silver medal – second place	2003 United Arab Emirates	Team

Spain national under-20 football team
Medal record

U-20 Mediterranean Games
Gold medal – first place	2009 Pescara, Italy	Team

The Spain national under-20 football team represents Spain in international football at this age level and is controlled by Royal Spanish Football Federation (RFEF), the governing body for football in Spain.

== Competitive Record ==
=== FIFA U-20 World Cup ===
Champions Runners-up Fourth Place

Year	Round	Position	GP	W	D*	L	GS	GA
(Tunisia) 1977	Group stage	7th	3	1	1	1	3	3
(Japan) 1979	Quarter-finals	6th	4	2	1*	1	3	2
(Australia) 1981	Group stage	13th	3	0	2	1	5	7
(Mexico) 1983	Did not qualify							
(Soviet Union) 1985	Runners-up	2nd	6	2	2*	2	8	8
(Chile) 1987	Did not qualify							
(Saudi Arabia) 1989	Group stage	15th	3	1	0	2	4	7
(Portugal) 1991	Quarter-finals	7th	4	2	1	1	8	3
(Australia) 1993	Did not qualify							
(Qatar) 1995	Fourth place	4th	6	4	0	2	19	12
(Malaysia) 1997	Quarter-finals	7th	5	4	0	1	10	3
(Nigeria) 1999	Champions	1st	7	5	2*	0	16	5
(Argentina) 2001	Did not qualify							
(United Arab Emirates) 2003	Runners-up	2nd	7	5	0	2	8	4
(Netherlands) 2005	Quarter-finals	7th	5	4	0	1	17	4
(Canada) 2007	Quarter-finals	5th	5	3	2*	0	13	8
(Egypt) 2009	Round of 16	11th	4	3	0	1	14	3
(Colombia) 2011	Quarter-finals	5th	5	3	2*	0	13	4
(Turkey) 2013	Quarter-finals	6th	5	4	0	1	9	4
(New Zealand) 2015	Did not qualify							
(South Korea) 2017	Did not qualify							
(Poland) 2019	Did not qualify							
(Argentina) 2023	Did not qualify							
(Chile) 2025	Quarter-finals	8th	5	2	1	2	6	7
(Azerbaijan) (Uzbekistan) 2027	Qualified							
(Armenia) (Georgia (country)) 2029	To be determined							
Total	1 title	16/26	77	45	14	18	156	84

*Denotes draws include knockout matches decided on penalty kicks.

Spain's U-20 World Cup matches
Year	Round	Score	Result
1977	Group stage	Spain 2–1 France	Won
1977	Group stage	Spain 1–1 Mexico	Draw
1977	Group stage	Spain 0–1 Tunisia	Lost
1979	Group stage	Spain 1–0 Japan	Won
1979	Group stage	Spain 2–1 Mexico	Won
1979	Group stage	Spain 0–1 Algeria	Lost
1979	Quarter-finals	Spain 0–0 Poland	Draw
1981	Group stage	Spain 2–2 Egypt	Draw
1981	Group stage	Spain 1–1 Mexico	Draw
1981	Group stage	Spain 2–4 West Germany	Lost
1985	Group stage	Spain 0–0 Saudi Arabia	Draw
1985	Group stage	Spain 0–2 Brazil	Lost
1985	Group stage	Spain 4–2 Republic of Ireland	Won
1985	Quarter-finals	Spain 2–1 Bulgaria	Won
1985	Semi-finals	Spain 2–2 Soviet Union	Draw
1985	Final	Spain 0–1 Brazil	Lost
1989	Group stage	Spain 2–1 Argentina	Won
1989	Group stage	Spain 0–2 Iraq	Lost
1989	Group stage	Spain 2–4 Norway	Lost
1991	Group stage	Spain 1–0 England	Won
1991	Group stage	Spain 6–0 Uruguay	Won
1991	Group stage	Spain 0–0 Syria	Draw
1991	Quarter-finals	Spain 1–3 Soviet Union	Lost
1995	Group stage	Spain 5–1 Burundi	Won
1995	Group stage	Spain 2–1 Japan	Won
1995	Group stage	Spain 6–3 Chile	Won
1995	Quarter-finals	Spain 4–1 Russia	Won
1995	Semi-finals	Spain 0–3 Argentina	Lost
1995	Third Place Match	Spain 2–3 Portugal	Lost
1997	Group stage	Spain 2–1 Japan	Won
1997	Group stage	Spain 2–1 Paraguay	Won
1997	Group stage	Spain 4–0 Costa Rica	Won
1997	Round of 16	Spain 2–0 Canada	Won
1997	Quarter-finals	Spain 0–1 Republic of Ireland	Lost
1999	Group stage	Spain 0–0 Zambia	Draw
1999	Group stage	Spain 2–0 Brazil	Won
1999	Group stage	Spain 3–1 Honduras	Won
1999	Round of 16	Spain 3–2 United States	Won
1999	Quarter-finals	Spain 1–1 Ghana	Draw
1999	Semi-finals	Spain 3–1 Mali	Won
1999	Final	Spain 4–0 Japan	Won
2003	Group stage	Spain 1–2 Argentina	Lost
2003	Group stage	Spain 2–0 Mali	Won
2003	Group stage	Spain 1–0 Uzbekistan	Won
2003	Round of 16	Spain 1–0 Paraguay	Won
2003	Quarter-finals	Spain 2–1 Canada	Won
2003	Semi-finals	Spain 1–0 Colombia	Won
2003	Final	Spain 0–1 Brazil	Lost
2005	Group stage	Spain 3–1 Morocco	Won
2005	Group stage	Spain 7–0 Chile	Won
2005	Group stage	Spain 3–0 Honduras	Won
2005	Round of 16	Spain 3–0 Turkey	Won
2005	Quarter-finals	Spain 1–3 Argentina	Lost
2007	Group stage	Spain 2–2 Uruguay	Draw
2007	Group stage	Spain 2–1 Zambia	Won
2007	Group stage	Spain 4–2 Jordan	Won
2007	Round of 16	Spain 4–2 Brazil	Won
2007	Quarter-finals	Spain 1–1 Czech Republic	Draw
2009	Group stage	Spain 8–0 Tahiti	Won
2009	Group stage	Spain 2–0 Nigeria	Won
2009	Group stage	Spain 3–0 Venezuela	Won
2009	Round of 16	Spain 1–3 Italy	Lost
2011	Group stage	Spain 4–1 Costa Rica	Won
2011	Group stage	Spain 2–0 Ecuador	Won
2011	Group stage	Spain 5–1 Australia	Won
2011	Round of 16	Spain 0–0 South Korea	Draw
2011	Quarter-finals	Spain 2–2 Brazil	Draw
2013	Group stage	Spain 4–1 United States	Won
2013	Group stage	Spain 1–0 Ghana	Won
2013	Group stage	Spain 2–1 France	Won
2013	Round of 16	Spain 2–1 Mexico	Won
2013	Quarter-finals	Spain 0–1 Uruguay	Lost
2025	Group stage	Spain 0–2 Morocco	Lost
2025	Group stage	Spain 2–2 Mexico	Draw
2025	Group stage	Spain 1–0 Brazil	Won
2025	Round of 16		

=== Mediterranean Games ===
Mediterranean Games record
Year	Round	Position	Pld	W	D*	L	GF	GA
(Greece) 1991	did not enter							
(France) 1993	did not enter							
(Italy) 1997	Fourth place	4th	4	1	1	2	2	4
(Tunisia) 2001	did not qualify							
(Spain) 2005	See Spain national under-23 football team							
(Italy) 2009	Gold medalists	1st	4	3	1	0	9	4
(Turkey) 2013	did not enter							
(Spain) 2018	See Spain national under-18 football team							
Total	1 Gold medal	2/6	8	4	2	2	11	8

== Individual awards ==
In addition to team victories, Spanish players have won individual awards at FIFA World Youth Cups.

Year	Golden Boot
(Soviet Union) 1985	Sebastián Losada Fernando Gómez
(Qatar) 1995	Joseba Etxeberria
(Nigeria) 1999	Pablo Couñago

== Player records ==
=== Top appearances ===
Rank	Player	Club(s)	Year(s)	U-20 Caps
1	Pablo Couñago	Celta Vigo, Numancia	1998–1999	13
	Jaime Gavilán	Valencia, Tenerife	2003–2005	13
	Francisco Jusué	Osasuna	1998–1999	13
4	Pablo Orbaiz	Osasuna	1998–1999	12
	Israel Puerto	Sevilla	2012–2013	12
	Rubén Suárez	Sporting Gijón	1998–1999	12
7	Sergio García	Barcelona	2003	11
	Aarón	Rangers, Celta Vigo	2009	11
	Dani Parejo	Real Madrid, Getafe	2009	11
	Carlos Peña	Barcelona	2003	11
	Juanfran	Real Madrid	2003–2005	11

Note: Club(s) represents the permanent clubs during the player's time in the Under-20s.

=== Top goalscorers ===
Rank	Player	Club(s)	Year(s)	U-20 Goals
1	Adrián	Deportivo	2007	10
	Joseba Etxeberria	Real Sociedad	1995	7
	Sergio García	Barcelona	2003	7
	Aarón	Rangers, Celta Vigo	2009	7
5	Pablo Couñago	Celta Vigo, Numancia	1998–1999	6
6	Fernando Llorente	Athletic Bilbao	2005	5
	Jesé	Real Madrid	2013	5
	Álvaro Vázquez	Espanyol	2011	5
9	Emilio Nsue	Castellón, Real Sociedad	2009	4
	David Silva	Eibar	2005	4
	Ismael Urzaiz	Real Madrid	1989–1991	4

Note: Club(s) represents the permanent clubs during the player's time in the Under-20s.

== Current squad ==
The following players were called up for the 2025 FIFA U-20 World Cup, between 27 September – 19 October 2025.

Caps and goals correct as of 11 October 2025, after the match against Colombia.

No.	Pos.	Player	Date of birth (age)	Caps	Goals	Club
1	GK	Fran González	24 June 2005 (age 21)	5	0	(Royal Spanish Football Federation) Real Madrid
13	GK	Raúl Jiménez	16 February 2006 (age 20)	1	0	(Royal Spanish Football Federation) Valencia
21	GK	Vicent Abril	15 February 2005 (age 21)	1	0	(Royal Spanish Football Federation) Valencia
2	DF	Pau Navarro	25 April 2005 (age 21)	5	0	(Royal Spanish Football Federation) Villarreal
3	DF	Julio Díaz	10 January 2005 (age 21)	7	0	(Royal Spanish Football Federation) Atlético Madrid
4	DF	Álvaro Cortés	17 March 2005 (age 21)	3	0	(Royal Spanish Football Federation) Barcelona
5	DF	Andrés Cuenca	11 June 2007 (age 19)	7	0	(Royal Spanish Football Federation) Barcelona
16	DF	Jesús Fortea	26 March 2007 (age 19)	5	0	(Royal Spanish Football Federation) Real Madrid
20	DF	Diego Aguado	7 February 2007 (age 19)	3	0	(Royal Spanish Football Federation) Real Madrid
6	MF	Izan Merino	15 April 2006 (age 20)	4	0	(Royal Spanish Football Federation) Málaga
7	MF	Rayane Belaid	11 February 2005 (age 21)	7	1	(Royal Spanish Football Federation) Atlético Madrid
8	MF	Rodri Mendoza	15 March 2005 (age 21)	6	0	(Royal Spanish Football Federation) Elche
12	MF	Thiago Pitarch	3 August 2007 (age 19)	6	0	(Royal Spanish Football Federation) Real Madrid
15	MF	Cristian Perea	17 August 2005 (age 21)	4	0	(Royal Spanish Football Federation) Real Madrid
18	MF	Peio Canales	17 January 2005 (age 21)	3	0	(Royal Spanish Football Federation) Racing Santander
9	FW	Adrián Liso	2 April 2005 (age 21)	6	0	(Royal Spanish Football Federation) Getafe
10	FW	Iker Bravo	13 January 2005 (age 21)	5	2	(Italian Football Federation) Udinese
11	FW	David Mella	23 May 2005 (age 21)	7	0	(Royal Spanish Football Federation) Deportivo La Coruña
14	FW	Joel Roca	7 June 2005 (age 21)	3	0	(Royal Spanish Football Federation) Girona
17	FW	Pablo García	13 June 2006 (age 20)	5	2	(Royal Spanish Football Federation) Real Betis
19	FW	Jan Virgili	26 July 2006 (age 20)	7	1	(Royal Spanish Football Federation) Mallorca

== Head-to-head record ==
The following table shows Spain's head-to-head record in the FIFA U-20 World Cup.

Opponent	Pld	W	D	L	GF	GA	GD	Win %
Algeria	1	0	0	1	0	1	−1	0.00
Argentina	4	1	0	3	4	9	−5	25.00
Australia	1	1	0	0	5	1	+4	100.00
Brazil	7	3	1	3	9	8	+1	42.86
Bulgaria	1	1	0	0	2	1	+1	100.00
Burundi	1	1	0	0	5	1	+4	100.00
Canada	2	2	0	0	4	1	+3	100.00
Colombia	1	1	0	0	1	0	+1	100.00
Costa Rica	2	2	0	0	8	1	+7	100.00
Chile	2	2	0	0	13	3	+10	100.00
Czech Republic	1	0	1	0	1	1	+0	0.00
Ecuador	1	1	0	0	2	0	+2	100.00
Egypt	1	0	1	0	2	2	+0	0.00
England	1	1	0	0	1	0	+1	100.00
France	2	2	0	0	4	2	+2	100.00
Ghana	2	1	1	0	2	1	+1	50.00
Honduras	2	2	0	0	6	1	+5	100.00
Iraq	1	0	0	1	0	2	−2	0.00
Italy	1	0	0	1	1	3	−2	0.00
Japan	4	4	0	0	9	2	+7	100.00
Jordan	1	1	0	0	4	2	+2	100.00
Mali	2	2	0	0	5	1	+4	100.00
Mexico	5	2	3	0	8	6	+2	40.00
Morocco	2	1	0	1	3	3	+0	50.00
Nigeria	1	1	0	0	2	0	+2	100.00
Norway	1	0	0	1	2	4	−2	0.00
Paraguay	2	2	0	0	3	1	+2	100.00
Poland	1	0	1	0	0	0	+0	0.00
Portugal	1	0	0	1	2	3	−1	0.00
Republic of Ireland	2	1	0	1	4	3	+1	50.00
Russia	1	1	0	0	4	1	+3	100.00
Saudi Arabia	1	0	1	0	0	0	+0	0.00
South Korea	1	0	1	0	0	0	+0	0.00
Soviet Union	2	0	1	1	3	5	−2	0.00
Syria	1	0	1	0	0	0	+0	0.00
Tahiti	1	1	0	0	8	0	+8	100.00
Tunisia	1	0	0	1	0	1	−1	0.00
Turkey	1	1	0	0	3	0	+3	100.00
United States	2	2	0	0	7	3	+4	100.00
Uruguay	3	1	1	1	8	3	+5	33.33
Uzbekistan	1	1	0	0	1	0	+1	100.00
Venezuela	1	1	0	0	3	0	+3	100.00
West Germany	1	0	0	1	2	4	−2	0.00
Zambia	2	1	1	0	2	1	+1	50.00
Total	75	44	14	17	153	81	+72	58.67

== Honours ==
=== Titles ===
- FIFA U-20 World Cup
  - (gold) Champions (1): 1999.
  - (silver) Runners-up (2): 1985, 2003

== Former squads ==
- 2013 FIFA under-20 World Cup squads – Spain
- 2011 FIFA under-20 World Cup squads – Spain
- 2009 FIFA under-20 World Cup squads – Spain
- 2007 FIFA under-20 World Cup squads – Spain
- 2005 FIFA under-20 World Cup squads – Spain
- 2003 FIFA under-20 World Cup squads – Spain
- 1999 FIFA under-20 World Cup squads – Spain
- 1997 FIFA under-20 World Cup squads – Spain
- 1995 FIFA under-20 World Cup squads – Spain
- 1991 FIFA under-20 World Cup squads – Spain
- 1989 FIFA under-20 World Cup squads – Spain
- 1985 FIFA under-20 World Cup squads – Spain
- 1981 FIFA under-20 World Cup squads – Spain
- 1979 FIFA under-20 World Cup squads – Spain
- 1977 FIFA under-20 World Cup squads – Spain

== See also ==
- Spain national football team
- Spain national under-23 football team
- Spain national under-21 football team
- Spain national under-19 football team
- Spain national under-18 football team
- Spain national under-17 football team
- Spain national under-16 football team
- Spain national under-15 football team
- Spain national youth football team
