= Pablo García (footballer, born 2006) =

Spanish footballer (born 2006)

Personal information
- Full name: Pablo García Fernández
- Date of birth: 13 June 2006 (age 20)
- Place of birth: Seville, Spain
- Height: 1.72 m (5 ft 8 in)
- Position: Winger

Team information
- Current team: Racing Santander
- Number: 15

Youth career
- 2012–2023: Betis

Senior career*
Years	Team	Apps	(Gls)
2023–2026	Betis B	38	(12)
2025–2026	Betis	21	(1)
2026–	Racing Santander	1	(1)

International career^{‡}
2021–2022	Spain U16	4	(0)
2024–2025	Spain U19	14	(5)
2025	Spain U20	5	(2)
2025–	Spain U21	8	(7)
Medal record
Men's football
Representing Spain
UEFA European Under-19 Championship
Runner-up	2025 Romania
- * Club domestic league appearances and goals as of 29 August 2026 ‡ National team caps and goals as of 02:18, 7 October 2026 (UTC)

Pablo García Fernández (born 13 June 2006) is a Spanish professional footballer who plays as a winger for Racing de Santander and the Spain national under-21 team.

== Club career ==
García joined the youth academy of Real Betis at the age of 6, and worked his up their youth categories and becomiong top scorer in the División de Honor Juvenil de Fútbol in the 2023–24 season with 43 goals in 38 games. He debuted with their reserves in 2023. On 23 January 2025, he signed his first professional contract with Real Betis until 2029. He made his senior and professional debut with the senior Real Betis side as a substitute in a 1–0 La Liga win over Mallorca on 25 January 2025.

García scored his first professional goal on 25 August 2026, netting the winner in a 1–0 away success over Valencia CF. Seven days later, he joined Racing de Santander also in the top tier, signing a four-year deal.

== International career ==
A youth product of Spain, García was called up to the Spain U17s for a set of friendlies in 2023. He was called up to the Spain U19s in November 2024. In the 2025 UEFA European Under-19 Championship semifinal, he scored four goals, including an extra-time winner, as Spain defeated Germany 6–5 after multiple lead changes.

In August 2025, García received his first call-up to the Spain U21 for the 2027 UEFA European Under-21 Championship qualification matches. He made his debut as a substitute in the match against Cyprus, scored a goal. He became the second youngest player in the category to score in his debut match at 19 years old, 2 months, and 23 days.

== Career statistics ==
As of match played 29 August 2026

Appearances and goals by club, season and competition
Club	Season	League			Copa del Rey		Europe		Total	
Club	Season	Division	Apps	Goals	Apps	Goals	Apps	Goals	Apps	Goals
Betis B	2023–24	Segunda Federación	4	0	—		—		4	0
Betis B	2024–25	Primera Federación	25	5	—		—		25	5
Betis B	2025–26	Primera Federación	9	7	—		—		9	7
Betis B	Total		38	12	—		—		38	12
Betis	2024–25	La Liga	3	0	—		2 (Note: Appearances in UEFA Conference League)	0	5	0
Betis	2025–26	La Liga	15	0	4	2	6 (Note: Appearances in UEFA Europa League)	0	25	2
Betis	2026–27	La Liga	2	1	0	0	0	0	2	1
Betis	Total		20	1	4	2	8	0	32	3
Career total			58	12	4	2	8	0	70	15

== Honours ==
Betis

- UEFA Conference League runner-up: 2024–25

Spain U19

- UEFA European Under-19 Championship runner-up: 2025

Individual

- UEFA European Under-19 Championship top scorer: 2025
- UEFA European Under-19 Championship Team of the Tournament: 2025
