= Jano Monserrate =

Spanish footballer (born 2006)

Personal information
- Full name: Alejandro Monserrate Pueyo
- Date of birth: 28 January 2006 (age 20)
- Place of birth: Zaragoza, Spain
- Height: 1.77 m (5 ft 10 in)
- Position: Attacking midfielder

Team information
- Current team: Ajax
- Number: 41

Youth career
- Zaragoza
- 2024: Atlético Madrid

Senior career*
| Years | Team | Apps | (Gls) |
| 2023 | Zaragoza B | 1 | (0) |
| 2024– | Atlético Madrid B | 58 | (3) |
| 2026 | Atlético Madrid | 2 | (0) |
| 2026– | Ajax | 0 | (0) |

International career^{‡}
| 2024 | Spain U18 | 4 | (0) |
| 2024– | Spain U19 | 12 | (2) |
Medal record
Men's football
Representing Spain
UEFA European Under-19 Championship
| Runner-up | 2025 Romania |
- * Club domestic league appearances and goals as of 25 May 2026 ‡ National team caps and goals as of 22 June 2025

Alejandro "Jano" Monserrate Pueyo (born 28 January 2006) is a Spanish footballer who plays as an attacking midfielder for Eredivisie club Ajax.

== Early life ==
Monserrate was born in Zaragoza, Spain.

== Career ==
As a youth player, Monserrate joined the youth academy of La Liga side Atlético Madrid. He was regarded as one of the club's most important players.

On 30 June 2026, Monserrate signed a four-year contract with Eredivisie club Ajax.

== Style of play ==
Monserrate mainly operates as a midfielder. He is left-footed.

== Honours ==
=== Spain U19 ===
- UEFA European Under-19 Championship runner-up: 2025
