= Jan Virgili =

Spanish footballer (born 2007)

Personal information
- Full name: Jan Virgili Tenas
- Date of birth: 26 July 2006 (age 20)
- Place of birth: Vilassar de Mar, Spain
- Height: 1.68 m (5 ft 6 in)
- Position: Winger

Team information
- Current team: Club Brugge
- Number: 11

Youth career
- Badalona
- Vilassar Dalt
- Espanyol
- Damm
- Mataró
- Europa
- 2021–2022: Granollers
- 2022–2024: Gimnàstic
- 2024–2025: Barcelona

Senior career*
Years	Team	Apps	(Gls)
2025	Barcelona B	17	(4)
2025–2026	Mallorca	31	(2)
2026–	Club Brugge	9	(2)

International career^{‡}
2025	Spain U19	5	(2)
2025	Spain U20	7	(1)
2025–	Spain U21	6	(4)
Medal record
Men's football
Representing Spain
UEFA European Under-19 Championship
Runner-up	2025 Romania
- * Club domestic league appearances and goals as of 31 October 2026 ‡ National team caps and goals as of 7 October 2026

Jan Virgili Tenas (born 26 July 2006) is a Spanish professional footballer who plays as a winger for Belgian Pro League club Club Brugge.

== Early life ==
Virgili was born on Vilassar de Mar, Barcelona, Catalonia.

== Club career ==
As a youth player, Virgili joined the youth academy of Gimnàstic de Tarragona. Ahead of the 2024–25 season, he joined the youth academy of La Liga side FC Barcelona, where he played in the UEFA Youth League.

In 2025, he was promoted to the club's reserve team. On 25 January 2025, he debuted for them during a 1–1 away draw with Ourense CF in the league. On 29 March 2025, he scored his first goal for them during a 2–0 home win over Cultural y Deportiva Leonesa in the league.

On 28 August 2025, Virgili joined La Liga side Mallorca, signing a five-year contract until 30 June 2030. He scored his first goal for the club in a 3–0 victory over Rayo Vallecano on 12 April 2026.

On 8 August 2026, Virgili signed a five-year contract with Belgian Pro League club Club Brugge. The transfer fee was reportedly €12m.

== International career ==
Virgili is a Spain youth international. He was included in the squad for the 2025 UEFA European Under-19 Championship in Romania, scoring his only goal of the tournament in the semi-final against Germany. He later appeared as a substitute in Spain's 1–0 defeat to the Netherlands in the final.

He was later called up for the FIFA U-20 World Cup in Chile, where he scored in the quarter-final match against Colombia.

Virgili made his debut for the Spain U21 during a 2027 UEFA European Under-21 Championship qualification match against San Marino in November 2025. He started on the match and scored a brace.

== Style of play ==
Virgili plays as a forward and is right-footed. Spanish newspaper Sport wrote in 2025 that he "is a striker who can play in any forward position... thrives on the wing... can operate on both flanks. Powerful and with a great change of pace".

== Career statistics ==
As of match played 31 October 2026

Appearances and goals by club, season and competition
Club	Season	League			National cup (Note: Includes Copa del Rey, Belgian Cup)		Europe		Other		Total	
Club	Season	Division	Apps	Goals	Apps	Goals	Apps	Goals	Apps	Goals	Apps	Goals
Barcelona B	2024–25	Primera Federación	17	4	—		—		0	0	17	4
Mallorca	2025–26	La Liga	31	2	3	0	—		—		34	2
Club Brugge	2026–27	Belgian Pro League	9	2	1	0	3 (Note: Appearances in UEFA Champions League)	0	—		13	2
Career total			57	8	4	0	3	0	0	0	64	8

== Honours ==
Barcelona

- UEFA Youth League: 2024–25

Spain U19

- UEFA European Under-19 Championship runner-up: 2025
