= Andrés Cuenca =

Spanish footballer (born 2007)

Personal information
- Full name: Andrés Cuenca Cejudo
- Date of birth: 11 June 2007 (age 19)
- Place of birth: Adamuz, Spain
- Height: 1.84 m (6 ft 0 in)
- Position: Centre-back

Team information
- Current team: Sporting Gijón (on loan from Como)
- Number: 44

Youth career
- Avejoe
- Villafranca
- Córdoba
- Sevilla
- 2019–2025: Barcelona

Senior career*
Years	Team	Apps	(Gls)
2024–2026	Barcelona B	26	(1)
2024–2026	Barcelona	0	(0)
2026	→ Sporting Gijón (loan)	8	(0)
2026–	Como	0	(0)
2026–	→ Sporting Gijón (loan)	0	(0)

International career^{‡}
2022–2023	Spain U15	6	(0)
2022–2023	Spain U16	6	(1)
2023	Spain U17	6	(0)
2023	Spain U18	3	(0)
2024–	Spain U19	15	(0)
2025	Spain U20	7	(0)
Medal record
Men's football
Representing Spain
UEFA European Under-19 Championship
Winner	2026 Wales
Runner-up	2025 Romania
- * Club domestic league appearances and goals as of 6 June 2026 ‡ National team caps and goals as of 21:50, 11 October 2025 (UTC)

Andrés Cuenca Cejudo (born 11 June 2007) is a Spanish professional footballer who plays as a centre-back for Segunda División club Sporting Gijón, on loan from Serie A club Como 1907.

== Club career ==
Born in Adamuz, Córdoba, Andalusia, in 2019, Cuenca joined the youth academy of Spanish La Liga side Barcelona, where he was regarded as one of the club's most important players. On 1 October 2024, Cuenca made his senior debut for Barcelona in a UEFA Champions League league phase match against Young Boys, coming off the bench to replace Iñigo Martínez in the 84th minute.

On 2 February 2026, Cuenca renewed his contract until 2027, and was loaned out to Segunda División club Sporting Gijón. On 17 July, he signed a four-year deal with Serie A club Como 1907, but returned to Sporting on a one-year loan deal on 18 August.

== International career ==
Cuenca represented Spain internationally at the 2023 FIFA U-17 World Cup. In 2024 he represented Spain's U17 side in the 2023 European U17 Championship. Spain were knocked out in the group stage, but Cuenca played in two of the three group matches.

== Style of play ==
Cuenca mainly operates as a defender and has been described as a "left-footed center-back with a more than clean ball output".

== Career statistics ==
As of match played 22 December 2024

Appearances and goals by club, season and competition
Club	Season	League			Copa del Rey		Europe		Other		Total	
Club	Season	Division	Apps	Goals	Apps	Goals	Apps	Goals	Apps	Goals	Apps	Goals
Barcelona Atlètic	2024–25	Primera Federación	19	0	—		—		0	0	0	0
Barcelona Atlètic	2025–26	Segunda Federación	0	0	—		—		0	0	0	0
Barcelona Atlètic	Total		19	0	0	0	0	0	0	0	19	0
Barcelona	2024–25	La Liga	0	0	0	0	1 (Note: Appearance in UEFA Champions League)	0	0	0	1	0
Career total			19	0	0	0	1	0	0	0	20	0

== Honours ==
Barcelona

- UEFA Youth League: 2024–25

Spain U19

- UEFA European Under-19 Championship: 2026; runner-up: 2025
