= Luca Szimionaș =

Romanian footballer

Personal information
- Full name: Luca Daniel Szimionaș
- Date of birth: 3 September 2006 (age 20)
- Place of birth: Timișoara, Romania
- Height: 1.85 m (6 ft 1 in)
- Position: Midfielder

Team information
- Current team: Universitatea Cluj
- Number: 5

Youth career
- –2021: Juventus Timișoara
- 2021–2022: Ripensia Timișoara
- 2022–2026: Hellas Verona

Senior career*
Years	Team	Apps	(Gls)
2022	Ripensia Timișoara	1	(0)
2025–2026	Hellas Verona	0	(0)
2026–	Universitatea Cluj	0	(0)

International career^{‡}
2021–2022	Romania U16	6	(2)
2022–2023	Romania U17	5	(0)
2023–2024	Romania U18	7	(2)
2024–2025	Romania U19	10	(2)
2025–	Romania U21	6	(0)
- * Club domestic league appearances and goals as of 26 August 2026 ‡ National team caps and goals as of 26 August 2026

Luca Daniel Szimionaș (born 3 September 2006) is a Romanian professional footballer who plays as a midfielder for Liga I club Universitatea Cluj.

== Club career ==
=== Early career ===
Szimionaș was born in Timișoara, Romania. He began playing football at Juventus Timișoara, before switching to Ripensia Timișoara, where his performances attracted the attention of Italian club Hellas Verona.

=== Hellas Verona ===
Szimionaș joined Hellas Verona in 2022 and initially played for the club's youth teams. He made 18 appearances for the under-17 side before progressing to the under-18 team, where he scored three goals in 12 appearances.

He subsequently progressed to the Primavera team. During three seasons with the Primavera side, he made 97 appearances, scoring five goals and providing three assists.

Szimionaș was also included in Hellas Verona's senior squad for Serie A matches against Sassuolo and AS Roma, as well as a Coppa Italia match against Venezia, although he did not make his senior debut for the club.

=== Universitatea Cluj ===
On 26 August 2026, Szimionaș joined Universitatea Cluj on a free transfer. Hellas Verona retained a percentage of a future transfer, while Szimionaș signed a four-year contract with the Romanian club.

== International career ==
Szimionaș has represented Romania at several youth levels. He made six appearances for the Romania under-16 team, scoring twice, and subsequently played five matches for the under-17 side and seven for the under-18 team.

In 2025, he was part of the Romania under-19 squad at the 2025 UEFA European Under-19 Championship, hosted in Romania. He played 350 of the team's 360 minutes during the tournament, as Romania reached the semi-finals. Szimionaș scored in Romania's 1–3 group-stage defeat to Spain.

He subsequently progressed to the Romania under-21 team, for which he had made six appearances by August 2026.

== Style of play ==
Szimionaș primarily plays as a central midfielder. He is right-footed and stands 1.85 metres tall.

== Career statistics ==
As of 20 August 2022

Appearances and goals by club, season and competition
Club	Season	League			National cup		Europe		Other		Total	
Club	Season	Division	Apps	Goals	Apps	Goals	Apps	Goals	Apps	Goals	Apps	Goals
Ripensia Timișoara	2022–23	Liga II	1	0	—		—		—		1	0
Hellas Verona	2025–26	Serie A	0	0	0	0	—		—		0	0
Universitatea Cluj	2026–27	Liga I	0	0	0	0	—		—		0	0
Career total			1	0	0	0	—		—		1	0
