= Zépiqueno Redmond =

Dutch footballer (born 2006)

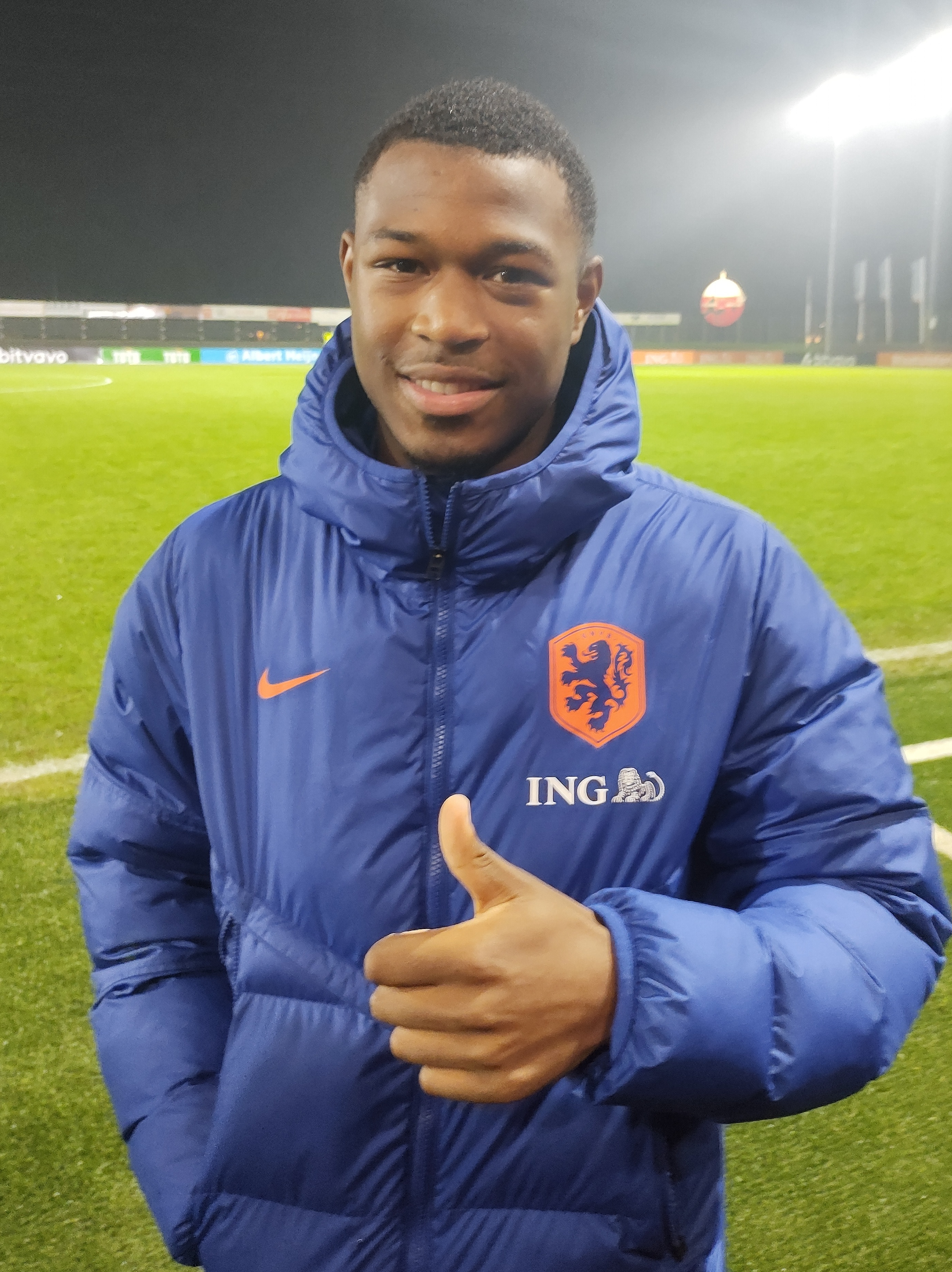
- Redmond in 2024

Personal information
- Full name: Zépiqueno Ponimin Charmant Redmond
- Date of birth: 22 June 2006 (age 20)
- Place of birth: Rotterdam, Netherlands
- Height: 1.84 m (6 ft 0 in)
- Positions: Striker; winger

Team information
- Current team: Annecy (on loan from Aston Villa)
- Number: 17

Youth career
- Alexandria'66
- 2015–2017: CVV Zwervers
- 2017–2019: ADO Den Haag
- 2019–2024: Feyenoord

Senior career*
Years	Team	Apps	(Gls)
2024–2025	Feyenoord	4	(0)
2025–	Aston Villa	0	(0)
2025–2026	→ Huddersfield Town (loan)	2	(1)
2026–	→ Annecy (loan)	6	(0)

International career^{‡}
2022	Netherlands U16	4	(0)
2022–2023	Netherlands U17	10	(0)
2023	Netherlands U18	5	(1)
2024–2025	Netherlands U19	9	(4)
Medal record
Men's football
Representing Netherlands
UEFA European Under-19 Championship
Winner	2025 Romania
- * Club domestic league appearances and goals as of 12:21, 21 September 2026 (UTC) ‡ National team caps and goals as of 18:53, 1 July 2025 (UTC)

Zépiqueno Ponimin Charmant Redmond (born 22 June 2006) is a Dutch professional footballer who plays as a striker for Ligue 2 club Annecy, on loan from side Aston Villa.

== Club career ==
Redmond is a youth product of Alexandria'66, CVV Zwervers and ADO Den Haag, before joining with the youth academy of Feyenoord in 2019.

=== Feyenoord ===
On 16 June 2022, Remond signed his first professional contract with Feyenoord until 2025. On 2 November 2024, he started training with the senior Feyenoord team after a set of injuries to their starting strikers Santiago Giménez, Ayase Ueda and Julián Carranza. He made his senior and professional debut with Feyenoord as a starter in a 4–1 Eredivisie win over Almere City on 10 November 2024. He scored his first goals in professional football by netting a brace in a 1–2 win against MVV Maastricht in the KNVB Cup on 17 December 2024. On 18 February 2025, Redmond made his debut in continental club football, starting in a 1–1 draw away against AC Milan in the UEFA Champions League knockout phase play-off.

=== Aston Villa ===
On 1 July 2025, following the expiry of his Feyenoord contract Redmond joined English club Aston Villa on a free transfer. On 1 September 2025, Redmond moved to EFL League One club Huddersfield Town on a season-long loan. Redmond made his English Football League debut on 13 September 2025, scoring in a 3–1 defeat to Bradford City. In January, the two clubs mutually agreed to cancel the loan after Redmond played three games in all competitions.

On 7 July 2026, Redmond joined Aston Villa's sister-club Annecy in Ligue 2 on a season-long loan.

== International career ==
Born in the Netherlands, Redmond is of Surinamese descent. He is a youth international for the Netherlands, having made the final squad of the Netherlands U17 for the 2023 UEFA European Under-17 Championship. He was called up to the Netherlands U19s in 2024. On 30 May 2025, Redmond was included in the Dutch squad for the European Under-19 Championship by head coach Peter van der Veen. At the tournament in Romania, he made two appearances and scored two goals in the group game England. The Netherlands eventually won the tournament for the first time.

== Personal life ==
Redmond's first name, "Zépiqueno", is inspired by the nickname of the character Zé Pequeno from the 2002 Brazilian gangster film City of God.

== Career statistics ==
As of match played 12 September 2026

Appearances by club, season and competition
Club	Season	League			National Cup		League Cup		Europe		Other		Total	
Club	Season	Division	Apps	Goals	Apps	Goals	Apps	Goals	Apps	Goals	Apps	Goals	Apps	Goals
Feyenoord	2024–25	Eredivisie	4	0	3	2	–		2 (Note: Appearances in UEFA Champions League)	0	–		9	2
Aston Villa	2025–26	Premier League	0	0	0	0	0	0	0	0	–		0	0
Aston Villa	2026–27	Premier League	0	0	0	0	0	0	0	0	–		0	0
Aston Villa	Total		0	0	0	0	0	0	0	0	0	0	0	0
Huddersfield Town (loan)	2025–26	EFL League One	2	1	0	0	1	0	–		0	0	3	1
Annecy (loan)	2026–27	Ligue 2	6	0	0	0	–		–		–		6	0
Career total			12	1	3	2	1	0	2	0	0	0	18	3

== Honours ==
Netherlands U19

- UEFA European Under-19 Championship: 2025
