= Antonio Cordero =

Spanish footballer (born 2006)

Personal information
- Full name: Antonio José Cordero Campillo
- Date of birth: 14 November 2006 (age 19)
- Place of birth: Jerez de la Frontera, Spain
- Height: 1.78 m (5 ft 10 in)
- Position: Winger

Team information
- Current team: Cádiz (on loan from Newcastle United)
- Number: 16

Youth career
- 2012–2014: Jerez Alternativa
- 2014–2016: Xerez Balompié
- 2016–2017: Cádiz
- 2017–2020: Sevilla
- 2020–2021: Betis
- 2021–2022: Málaga
- 2022–2023: San Félix

Senior career*
Years	Team	Apps	(Gls)
2023–2024	Málaga B	17	(12)
2023–2025	Málaga	55	(6)
2025–	Newcastle United	0	(0)
2025	→ Westerlo (loan)	7	(0)
2026–	→ Cádiz (loan)	21	(3)

International career^{‡}
2023–2024	Spain U18	6	(1)
2024–	Spain U19	17	(4)
Medal record
Men's football
Representing Spain
UEFA European Under-19 Championship
Runner-up	2025 Romania
- * Club domestic league appearances and goals as of 31 May 2026 ‡ National team caps and goals as of 27 June 2025 (UTC)

Antonio José Cordero Campillo (born 14 November 2006), sometimes known as Antoñito, is a Spanish professional footballer who plays mainly as a winger for Segunda División club Cádiz, on loan from Premier League club Newcastle United.

== Club career ==
=== Málaga ===
Born in Jerez de la Frontera, Cádiz, Andalusia, Cordero joined Málaga's youth setup in 2021, after representing Real Betis, Sevilla, Cádiz, Xerez Balompié and Jerez Alternativa. On 17 November 2022, he signed his first professional contract with the former, after agreeing to a three-year deal.

On 2 September 2023, before even having appeared with the reserves, Cordero made his first team debut by coming on as a late substitute for fellow youth graduate David Larrubia in a 2–1 Primera Federación home win over Atlético Madrid B; aged 16 years, nine months and 17 days, he became the fourth-youngest player to debut for Málaga. He scored his first senior goals on 24 September, netting a brace for the B's in a 3–1 Tercera Federación home win over Almería.

Cordero alternated between the main and reserve squads during the remainder of the season, scoring 12 goals for the B's. On 22 June 2024, he came in as an extra-time substitute for David Ferreiro in the second leg of the promotion play-off finals against Gimnàstic, and scored a last-minute equalizer to put his side ahead on aggregate and subsequently achieve promotion to Segunda División; it was also his first goal with the main squad.

Cordero made his professional debut on 17 August 2024; after replacing goalscorer Kevin Villodres, he scored Málaga's second in a 2–2 away draw against Racing Ferrol. Despite being regularly used during the campaign, he announced his departure on 2 June of the following year, after refusing a contract renewal.

=== Newcastle United ===
On 5 June 2025, it was announced that Cordero would be joining English Premier League club Newcastle United upon the expiry of his contract on 1 July. On 2 August 2025, he joined Belgian Pro League side KVC Westerlo for a season-long loan. The deal was however cut short in the winter as Cordero was instead loaned to Cádiz.

On 11 July 2026, Cordero's loan with Cádiz was extended for a further year.

== International career ==
On 4 October 2023, Cordero was called up to the Spain national under-18 team, playing in the Four Nations Tournament against Portugal, Turkey and Romania.

== Career statistics ==
As of 2 June 2025

Appearances and goals by club, season and competition
Club	Season	League			Cup		Continental		Other		Total	
Club	Season	Division	Apps	Goals	Apps	Goals	Apps	Goals	Apps	Goals	Apps	Goals
Málaga B	2023–24	Tercera Federación	17	12	—		—		2 (Note: Appearances in the promotion play-offs)	0	19	12
Málaga	2023–24	Primera Federación	16	0	3	0	—		1	1	20	1
Málaga	2024–25	Segunda División	39	6	1	0	—		—		40	6
Málaga	Total		55	6	4	0	—		1	1	60	7
Career total			72	18	4	0	0	0	3	1	79	19

== Honours ==
=== Spain U19 ===
- UEFA European Under-19 Championship runner-up: 2025
