= Sondre Granaas =

Norwegian footballer (born 2006)

Personal information
- Full name: Sondre Milian Granaas
- Date of birth: 30 August 2006 (age 20)
- Place of birth: Drammen, Norway
- Height: 1.78 m (5 ft 10 in)
- Position: Midfielder

Team information
- Current team: Molde
- Number: 23

Youth career
- –2020: Stoppen
- 2020–2022: Mjøndalen

Senior career*
Years	Team	Apps	(Gls)
2021–2023	Mjøndalen 2	26	(0)
2022–2024	Mjøndalen	28	(2)
2024–	Molde	43	(3)
2024–	Molde 2	11	(1)

International career^{‡}
2022	Norway U16	1	(0)
2023	Norway U17	3	(0)
2023–2024	Norway U18	14	(2)
2023–2025	Norway U19	11	(2)
2025–	Norway U20	5	(0)
- * Club domestic league appearances and goals as of 2 August 2026 ‡ National team caps and goals as of 13 October 2025

Sondre Milian Granaas (born 30 August 2006) is a Norwegian professional footballer who plays as a midfielder for Molde.

== Club career ==
A youth product of Stoppen, and later Mjøndalen, Granaas made his professional debut with the latter in a 0–0 Norwegian First Division draw against Åsane on 10 April 2023.

In August 2022, he signed his first professional contract with Mjøndalen. By the end of 2023, he had become a key player of the first team.

In January 2024, despite interest from several foreign European clubs, he signed for Molde in Eliteserien.

Scoring for his debut with the historic Norwegian club, in a 5–0 win over Eide og Omegn in NM Cup on 10 April 2024, by the end of the 2024 season, he established himself as a regular member of the first team in the national league and the UEFA Conference League.

On 29 July 2026, Granaas signed to extend his contract with the club until 2029, while his previous deal was due to expire in 2026.

== International career ==
Granaas is a youth international for Norway, having played in both the 2024 UEFA European Under-19 Championship and the 2025 UEFA European Under-19 Championship with the under-19. In the 2025 Championship, Graanas scored twice, once against England U19 and once against Germany U19.

== Personal life ==
Born in Drammen, Granaas is the son of former professional footballer Lars Granaas. His younger brother Eirik Granaas also plays as a first tier footballer in Norway.

== Career statistics ==
As of 7 November 2025

Appearances and goals by club, season and competition
Club	Season	League			National Cup		Europe		Total	
Club	Season	Division	Apps	Goals	Apps	Goals	Apps	Goals	Apps	Goals
Mjøndalen 2	2021	3. divisjon	2	0	—		—		2	0
Mjøndalen 2	2022	3. divisjon	17	0	—		—		17	0
Mjøndalen 2	2023	3. divisjon	7	0	—		—		7	0
Mjøndalen 2	Total		26	0	—		—		26	0
Mjøndalen	2023	1. divisjon	28	2	3	0	—		31	2
Molde	2024	Eliteserien	9	0	5	2	5 (Note: Appearances in UEFA Conference League)	0	19	2
Molde	2025	Eliteserien	18	0	4	2	0	0	22	2
Molde	Total		27	0	9	4	5	0	41	4
Molde 2	2024	3. divisjon	7	1	—		—		7	1
Molde 2	2025	3. divisjon	3	0	—		—		3	0
Molde 2	Total		10	1	—		—		10	1
Career total			91	3	12	4	5	0	108	7
