= Raúl Jiménez (footballer, born 2006) =

Spanish footballer (born 2006)

Personal information
- Full name: Raúl Jiménez Latorre
- Date of birth: 16 February 2006 (age 20)
- Place of birth: Catral, Spain
- Height: 1.86 m (6 ft 1 in)
- Position: Goalkeeper

Team information
- Current team: Valencia B
- Number: 13

Youth career
- 2013–2014: Sporteam
- 2014–2015: Benferri
- 2015–2017: Kelme
- 2017–2018: Villarreal
- 2018–2019: Roda
- 2019–2020: Elche
- 2020–2025: Valencia

Senior career*
Years	Team	Apps	(Gls)
2024–	Valencia B	10	(0)

International career^{‡}
2023	Spain U16	4	(0)
2022–2023	Spain U17	16	(0)
2023–2024	Spain U18	3	(0)
2024–2025	Spain U19	19	(0)
2025	Spain U20	1	(0)
Medal record
Men's football
Representing Spain
UEFA European Under-19 Championship
Winner	2024 Northern Ireland
Runner-up	2025 Romania
- * Club domestic league appearances and goals as of 24 May 2026 ‡ National team caps and goals as of 7 October 2025

Raúl Jiménez Latorre (born 16 February 2006) is a Spanish footballer who plays as a goalkeeper for Valencia CF Mestalla and served as the captain of Spain U19 at the 2025 UEFA European Under-19 Championship.

Jiménez has represented Spain at various youth levels, and was part of the squad that won the 2024 UEFA European Under-19 Championship.

== Club career ==
Jiménez is a product of Valencia's youth academy, having joined the club at the age of 14 in 2020. He progressed through the youth ranks, from the U14s to the U19 level. In 2022, he signed a contract extension with the club until June 2024.

In 2023, while representing the Spain U17 at the 2023 FIFA U-17 World Cup, Jiménez extended his contract with Valencia until 2026.

Although primarily playing for Valencia U19, he occasionally trained with Valencia CF Mestalla, the club's reserve team. He made his debut with the reserves during the 2024–25 season.

== International career ==
Jiménez received his first call-up to the Spain U16 in February 2022 under manager David Gordo. He was later called up by manager Julen Guerrero to the Spain U17 squad for the 2023 UEFA European Under-17 Championship in Hungary. Later that year, he participated in the 2023 FIFA U-17 World Cup in Indonesia under coach José Lana.

In 2024, Jiménez was called up to the Spain U19 for the 2024 UEFA European Under-19 Championship in Northern Ireland, again under José Lana, who at the time coached the U19s team. Despite being a year younger than most of the squad, he was the team's starting goalkeeper throughout the tournament. He later won the tournament as Spain defeating France U19 2–0 in the final.

He was again selected for the 2025 UEFA European Under-19 Championship in Romania, where he served as team captain. Spain finished as runners-up, losing 1–0 to the Netherlands U19 in the final following an own goal by Jiménez.

== Style of play ==
Jiménez is a left-footed, well-rounded goalkeeper known for his footwork. While he is still developing his aerial ability and game-reading skills, he compensates with strong reflexes, agility, confident positioning, and bravery when coming off his line. He has received comparisons with Valencia's first-choice goalkeeper Giorgi Mamardashvili.

Former player Javi Venta, who currently part of Valencia's talent development department, described Jiménez as a player who "excels at starting off the game, making long runs... and also has great height."

== Honours ==
Spain U19

- UEFA European Under-19 Championship: 2024; runner-up: 2025
