= Jesse Derry =

English footballer (born 2007)

Personal information
- Full name: Jesse Shaun Derry
- Date of birth: 30 June 2007 (age 19)
- Place of birth: Harrogate, England
- Height: 1.88 m (6 ft 2 in)
- Position: Winger

Team information
- Current team: Sporting CP (on loan from Chelsea)
- Number: 28

Youth career
- 2012–2025: Crystal Palace
- 2025–2026: Chelsea

Senior career*
Years	Team	Apps	(Gls)
2026–	Chelsea	1	(0)
2026–	→ Sporting CP (loan)	4	(0)

International career^{‡}
2023–2024	England U17	5	(4)
2024–2025	England U18	10	(4)
2024–2025	England U19	15	(8)
2026–	England U20	5	(1)
- * Club domestic league appearances and goals as of 17:05, 25 October 2026 (UTC) ‡ National team caps and goals as of 18:40, 16 November 2026 (UTC)

Jesse Shaun Derry (born 30 June 2007) is an English professional footballer who plays as a winger for Primeira Liga club Sporting CP, on loan from Premier League club Chelsea, and the England under-19 national team.

== Club career ==
Derry was in the youth academy at Crystal Palace and was named Palace’s U-18s player of the season in 2023–24 after scoring 16 goals in 22 appearances. He was offered a new contract by the club, prior to joining Chelsea in 2025 on a four-year contract.

As a second-half substitute, Derry debuted for Chelsea on 13 February 2026 during the 4–0 victory against Hull City in the FA Cup fourth round. A few months later, on 4 May, he made his debut in the Premier League, starting against Nottingham Forest. However, he was forced off the field before half-time after suffering a head injury in a head-on-head collision with Zach Abbott and was later hospitalised as a precaution.

On 8 July 2026, Derry signed a six-year contract extension with Chelsea. He instantly joined Primeira Liga club Sporting CP on a season-long loan.

== International career ==
Derry is an England youth international, having featured at under-17 and under-18 level. He was a member of the squad at the 2025 UEFA European Under-19 Championship and scored in group stage games against Germany and Netherlands.

On 25 September 2026, Derry scored on his debut for England U20 against Italy U20 at the U20 Euro Elite League.

== Personal life ==
He is the son of football manager and former player Shaun Derry.

== Career statistics ==
As of 21 November 2026

Appearances and goals by club, season and competition
Club	Season	League			National Cup (Note: Includes FA Cup)		League Cup (Note: Includes Taça da Liga)		Europe		Other		Total	
Club	Season	Division	Apps	Goals	Apps	Goals	Apps	Goals	Apps	Goals	Apps	Goals	Apps	Goals
Chelsea U21s	2024–25	—			—		—		—		1 (Note: Appearance(s) in EFL Trophy)	0	1	0
Chelsea U21s	2025–26	—			—		—		—		2	0	2	0
Chelsea U21s	Total		—		—		—		—		3	0	3	0
Chelsea	2025–26	Premier League	1	0	2	0	0	0	0	0	—		3	0
Sporting CP (loan)	2026–27	Primeira Liga	4	0	1	0	1	0	2 (Note: Appearances in UEFA Champions League)	0	—		8	0
Career total			5	0	3	0	1	0	2	0	3	0	14	0

== Honours ==
Chelsea U21

- Premier League 2: 2025–26

Chelsea

- FA Cup runner-up: 2025–26
