= David Gordo =

Spanish football manager (born 1970)

Personal information
- Full name: Juan David Gordo Mansilla
- Date of birth: 2 February 1970 (age 56)
- Place of birth: Alcalá de Henares, Spain

Team information
- Current team: Spain U21 (manager)

Managerial career
- Years: Team
- Real Madrid (youth)
- 1998–2000: Atlético Pinto
- 2000–2002: Móstoles
- 2002–2004: Alcalá
- 2005–2006: Alcorcón
- 2007–2009: Leganés
- 2009–2010: Vallecas
- 2010–2011: Atlético Pinto (youth)
- 2011–2013: Collado Villalba
- 2014–2015: Atlético Pinto (youth)
- 2018: Spain U16
- 2018–2021: Spain U17
- 2018–2019: Spain U18
- 2021–2022: Spain U16
- 2022–2023: Oman U20
- 2023–2025: Spain U21 (assistant)
- 2023–2025: Spain U16
- 2025–: Spain U21

Juan David Gordo Mansilla (born 2 February 1970) is a Spanish football manager, currently in charge of the Spain national under-21 team.

== Career ==
Born in Alcalá de Henares, Community of Madrid, Gordo coached in the youth sides of Real Madrid before having his first senior experience at the helm of CA Pinto in 1998, leading the side to a promotion to Tercera División. In 2000, he took over fellow fourth division side CD Móstoles, and missed out promotion in the play-offs in the two seasons he was in charge.

In 2002, Gordo was appointed manager of Segunda División B club RSD Alcalá, and managed to avoid relegation in his two-year spell. In 2005, after one year without a club, he was named in charge of fellow league team AD Alcorcón, but was sacked in September 2006 after a poor start of the new season.

Appointed CD Leganés manager in July 2007, Gordo was dismissed from the club on 5 May 2009, one round before the end of the campaign. He then spent a year in charge of Vallecas CF, where he suffered relegation, before returning to Atlético Pinto as a manager of their Juvenil team.

In 2011, Gordo accepted an offer of Preferente de Madrid side CU Collado Villalba to become their manager. He achieved immediate promotion, and missed out a second consecutive one in the play-offs before departing in June 2013; shortly after, he joined the structure of the Royal Spanish Football Federation, being a fitness and assistant coach of the youth sides.

On 3 January 2018, after another spell at Pinto, Gordo became the manager of the Spain national under-16 team. he later coached the under-17 and under-18 sides before returning to the under-16s in 2021, and departed the national team on 9 February 2022, to take over Oman's youth categories.

On 8 May 2023, Gordo returned to the Spain national team, initially as an assistant of Santi Denia in the under-21 squad and later taking over the under-16s. On 16 July 2025, he was appointed manager of the former category, replacing sacked Denia.
