= Alexander Røssing-Lelesiit =

Norwegian footballer (born 2007)

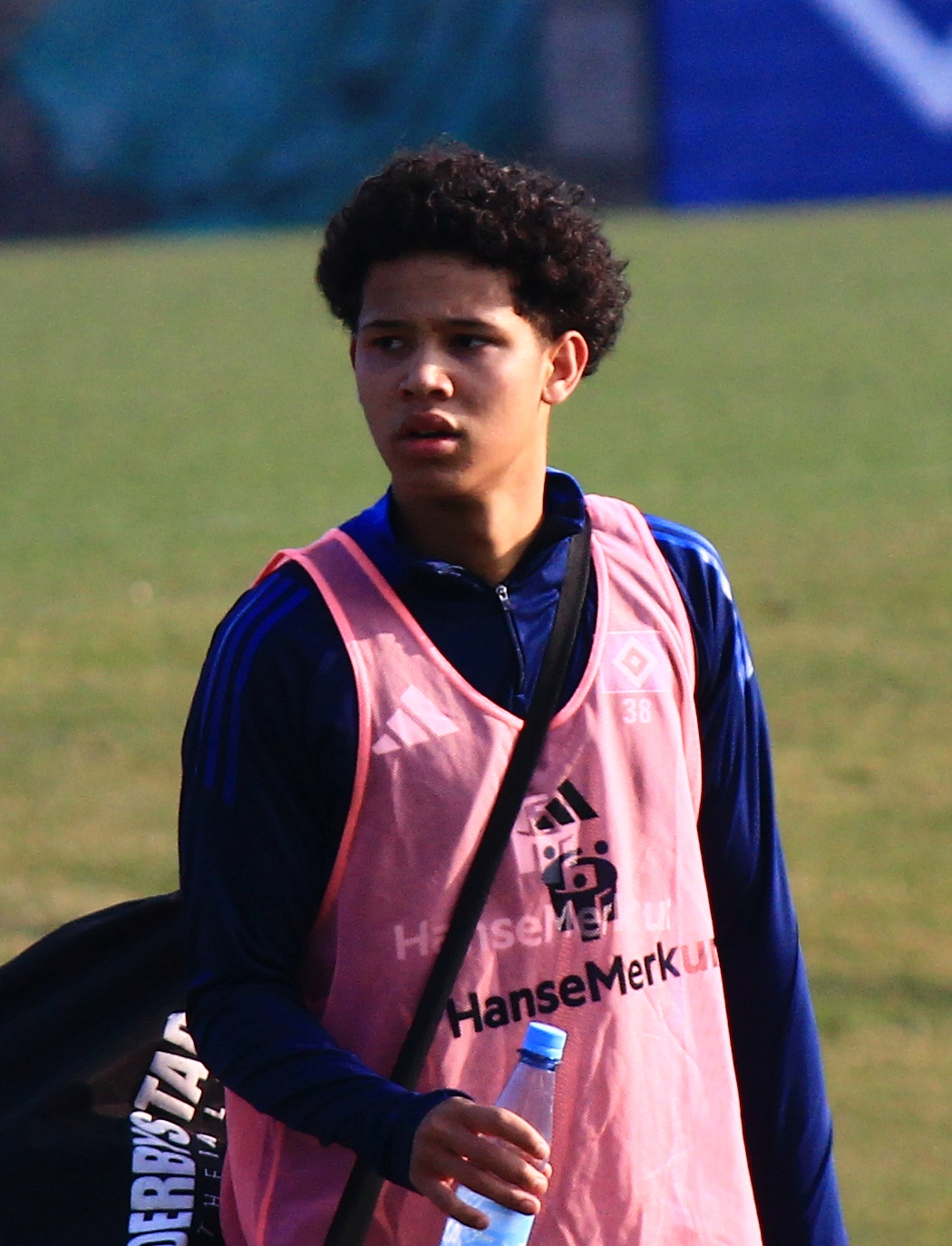
- Røssing-Lelesiit with Hamburger SV in 2025

Personal information
- Date of birth: 20 January 2007 (age 19)
- Place of birth: Nittedal, Norway
- Height: 1.84 m (6 ft 0 in)
- Positions: Left winger; right winger

Team information
- Current team: Hamburger SV
- Number: 38

Youth career
- –2021: Nittedal
- 2022–2024: Lillestrøm

Senior career*
Years	Team	Apps	(Gls)
2024–2025	Lillestrøm	11	(1)
2025–	Hamburger SV	16	(0)
2025–	Hamburger SV II	2	(0)

International career^{‡}
2024	Norway U17	2	(2)
2025–	Norway U19	12	(4)
2026–	Norway U21	2	(0)
- * Club domestic league appearances and goals as of 1 November 2026 ‡ National team caps and goals as of 17 November 2026

Alexander Røssing-Lelesiit (born 20 January 2007) is a Norwegian professional footballer who plays as a winger for German Bundesliga club Hamburger SV.

== Club career ==
Røssing-Lelesiit hails from Nittedal. He played for the local team Nittedal IL throughout 2021. Upon changing to Lillestrøm SK's academy in late 2022, he tore a meniscus and was available to play in May 2022. He was drafted into the senior team in 2024 and made his Eliteserien debut against Fredrikstad in May 2024.

In September 2024 he made his youth international debut for Norway, representing Norway U17. Around the same time, Lillestrøm sacked their manager and brought in Dag-Eilev Fagermo, and under Fagermo, Røssing-Lelesiit made a breakthrough. First, he scored in his cup debut against Molde in early October 2024. Then, as Lillestrøm languished below the relegation line in Eliteserien, the club found new hope after beating Odd (the other team sitting in a relegation spot) 3–0. Røssing-Lelesiit scored one of the goals, his first Eliteserien goal, which drew nationwide attention. Røssing-Lelesiit was praised for being "cocky" and "humble" at the same time, as well as "fearless" in trying difficult maneuvers on the pitch.

On 3 February 2025, Røssing-Lelesiit signed a long-term contract with Hamburger SV in German 2. Bundesliga.

== International career ==
Røssing-Lelesiit was born in Kenya to a Kenyan father and Norwegian mother. He played for the Norway U19s at the 2025 UEFA European Under-19 Championship.

== Career statistics ==
As of match played 1 November 2026

Appearances and goals by club, season and competition
Club	Season	League			National cup (Note: Includes Norwegian Football Cup, DFB-Pokal)		Europe		Other		Total	
Club	Season	Division	Apps	Goals	Apps	Goals	Apps	Goals	Apps	Goals	Apps	Goals
Lillestrøm	2024	Eliteserien	11	1	1	1	—		—		12	2
Hamburger SV	2024–25	2. Bundesliga	2	0	0	0	—		—		2	0
Hamburger SV	2025–26	Bundesliga	11	0	3	0	—		—		14	0
Hamburger SV	2026–27	Bundesliga	3	0	1	0	—		—		4	0
Hamburger SV	Total		16	0	4	0	—		—		20	0
Hamburger SV II	2024–25	Regionalliga Nord	2	0	—		—		—		2	0
Hamburger SV II	2025–26	Regionalliga Nord	0	0	—		—		—		0	0
Hamburger SV II	Total		2	0	—		—		—		2	0
Career total			29	1	5	1	0	0	0	0	34	2
