= David Barbu =

Romanian footballer (born 2006)

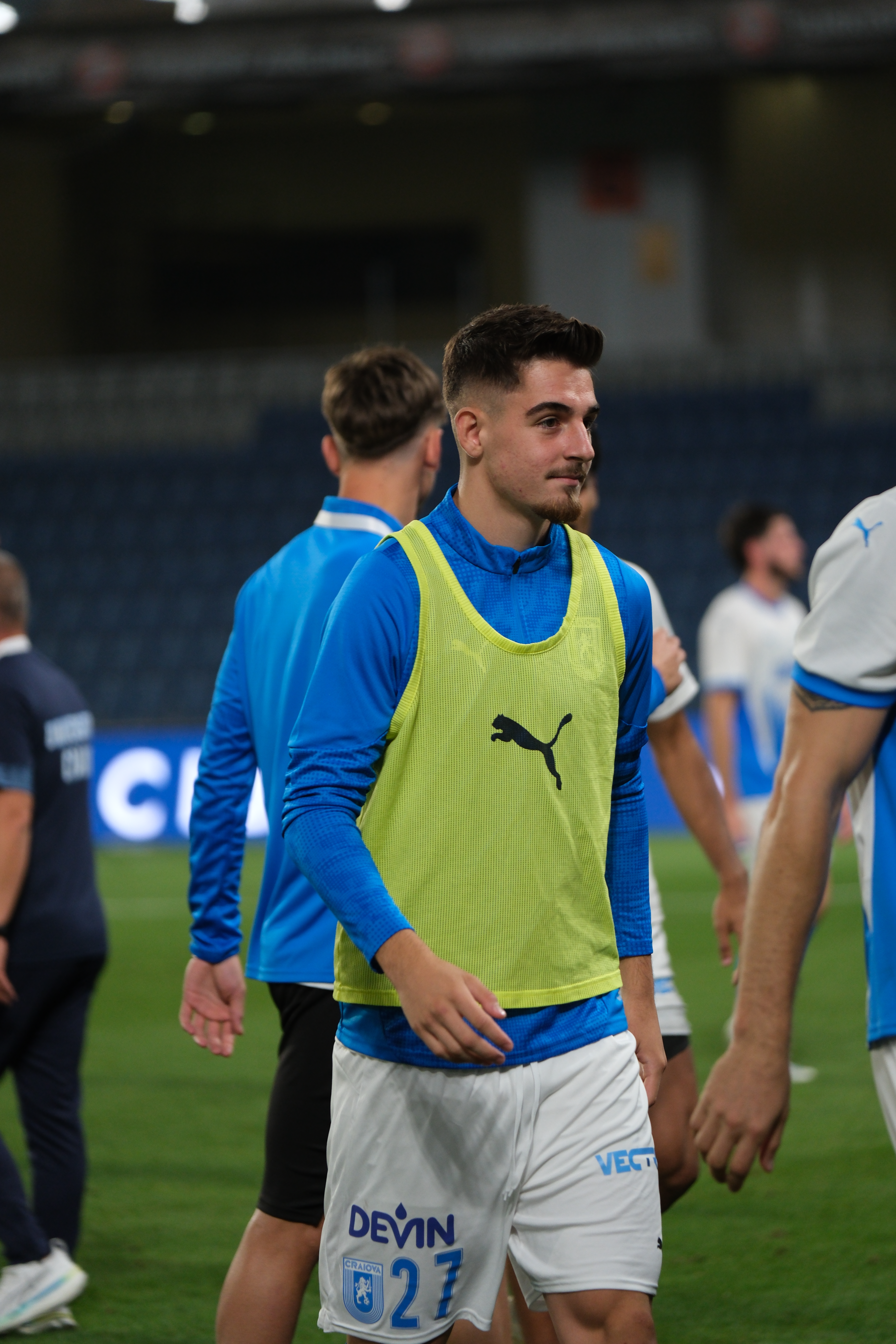
- Barbu with Universitatea Craiova in 2025

Personal information
- Full name: David Andrei Barbu
- Date of birth: 26 June 2006 (age 20)
- Place of birth: Craiova, Romania
- Height: 1.90 m (6 ft 3 in)
- Position: Winger

Team information
- Current team: Universitatea Craiova
- Number: 27

Youth career
- 2012–2016: Șoimii Știința Craiova
- 2016–2020: Dinamik Craiova
- 2020–2021: CSJ Știința "U" Craiova
- 2021–2024: Universitatea Craiova

Senior career*
Years	Team	Apps	(Gls)
2024–	Universitatea Craiova	22	(1)
2025–2026	→ UTA Arad (loan)	17	(2)
2026	→ CSA Steaua București (loan)	5	(0)

International career^{‡}
2023	Romania U18	1	(0)
2024–2025	Romania U19	7	(3)
2025–	Romania U20	6	(1)
- * Club domestic league appearances and goals as of 29 August 2026 ‡ National team caps and goals as of 31 March 2026

David Andrei Barbu (born 26 June 2006) is a Romanian professional footballer who plays as a winger for Liga I club Universitatea Craiova.

== Career statistics ==
As of 29 August 2026

Appearances and goals by club, season and competition
Club	Season	League			Cupa României		Europe		Other		Total	
Club	Season	Division	Apps	Goals	Apps	Goals	Apps	Goals	Apps	Goals	Apps	Goals
Universitatea Craiova	2024–25	Liga I	16	1	0	0	0	0	—		16	1
Universitatea Craiova	2025–26	Liga I	6	0	1	0	0	0	—		7	0
Universitatea Craiova	2026–27	Liga I	0	0	0	0	0	0	—		0	0
Universitatea Craiova	Total		22	1	1	0	0	0	—		23	1
UTA Arad (loan)	2025–26	Liga I	17	2	2	0	—		—		19	2
CSA Steaua București (loan)	2026–27	Liga II	5	0	1	0	—		—		6	0
Career total			44	3	4	0	0	0	—		48	3

== Honours ==
Universitatea Craiova

- Liga I: 2025–26
- Cupa României: 2025–26
