= Villum Berthelsen =

Danish footballer (born 2006)

Personal information
- Full name: Peter Villum Berthelsen
- Date of birth: 14 April 2006 (age 20)
- Place of birth: Allerød, Denmark
- Height: 1.81 m (5 ft 11 in)
- Positions: Left winger; midfielder

Team information
- Current team: Nordsjælland
- Number: 29

Youth career
- 2012–2017: Allerød FK
- 2017–2019: Ølstykke FC
- 2019–2024: Nordsjælland

Senior career*
Years	Team	Apps	(Gls)
2024–	Nordsjælland	36	(1)

International career^{‡}
2023–2024	Denmark U-18	6	(0)
2024–2025	Denmark U-19	12	(1)
2026–	Denmark U-20	2	(0)
- * Club domestic league appearances and goals as of 18 October 2026 ‡ National team caps and goals as of 02:00, 5 October 2026 (UTC)

Peter Villum Berthelsen (born 14 April 2006) is a Danish footballer who plays as a left winger or midfielder for Danish Superliga club FC Nordsjælland.

== Club career ==
=== FC Nordsjælland ===
Berthelsen began his football career at Allerød FK at the age of six. (Note: Villum Berthelsen national team profile at the Danish Football Association (in Danish)) He then spent two years at Ølstykke FC before moving on to FC Nordsjælland. There, he became part of the youth academy. In April 2023, Berthelsen was named Player of the Tournament at the major international competition, the Future Cup.

In the winter of 2024, 16-year old Berthelsen began to move closer to the first team as he was selected for the Superliga squad that travelled to San Diego for a training camp. In the summer of 2024, he was once again part of the Superliga squad during their training camp. A month and a half later, Berthelsen signed a new contract with Nordsjælland, extending his stay until June 2028.

In February 2025, Berthelsen was officially promoted to the first-team squad on a permanent basis. On 30 March 2025, Berthelsen made his official debut for FC Nordsjælland, being named in the starting lineup for the Danish Superliga match against AGF. On 29 May 2025, Berthelsen extended his contract with FC Nordsjælland until 2029.

On 29 May 2025, Nordsjælland confirmed, that Berthelsen had extended his contract until June 2029.

== Career statistics ==
As of match played 18 October 2026

Appearances and goals by club, season and competition
Club	Season	League			Cup		Europe		Total	
Club	Season	Division	Apps	Goals	Apps	Goals	Apps	Goals	Apps	Goals
Nordsjælland	2024–25	Danish Superliga	6	0	—		—		6	0
Nordsjælland	2025–26	Danish Superliga	21	0	2	1	—		23	1
Nordsjælland	2026–27	Danish Superliga	11	1	1	0	6 (Note: Appearances in UEFA Conference League)	2	18	3
Career total			38	1	3	1	6	2	47	4
