= Mike Themsen =

Danish footballer (born 2006)

Personal information
- Full name: Mike Kofod Themsen
- Date of birth: 1 March 2006 (age 20)
- Place of birth: Hundested, Denmark
- Height: 1.73 m (5 ft 8 in)
- Position: Left winger

Team information
- Current team: Randers
- Number: 7

Youth career
- 2012–2013: FIF Hillerød
- 2013–2016: Hundested IK
- 2016–2020: Nordsjælland
- 2020–2023: Helsingør
- 2023–2024: Randers

Senior career*
Years	Team	Apps	(Gls)
2024–	Randers	53	(2)

International career^{‡}
2024	Denmark U18	1	(0)
2024–	Denmark U19	8	(4)
- * Club domestic league appearances and goals as of 19 May 2026 ‡ National team caps and goals as of 23:00, 19 November 2024 (UTC)

Mike Kofod Themsen (born 1 March 2006) is a Danish professional footballer who plays as a left winger for Danish Superliga club Randers FC.

== Club career ==
=== Randers ===
Themsen was brought up in FC Nordsjælland before moving to FC Helsingør as an U15 player in the summer of 2020. Ahead of the 2023–24 season, 17-year-old Themsen moved to Randers FC, where he became part of the club's U-19 squad.

On 23 February 2024 Themsen was on the bench for Randers in the Danish Superliga for the first time. However, he had to wait until 7 April 2024 to make his debut as Themsen was substituted for his first Danish Superliga match, coming off the bench to replace Noah Shamoun against Hvidovre IF.

On 3 June 2024 Randers confirmed that Themsen had signed a new three-year contract, so the agreement now expired at the end of June 2027. On 19 December, his contract was extended again, this time keeping him at the club until 2028.
