= Remus Guțea =

Romanian footballer

Personal information
- Full name: Remus Gabriel Guțea
- Date of birth: 2 November 2006 (age 20)
- Place of birth: Videle, Romania
- Height: 1.78 m (5 ft 10 in)
- Position: Left winger

Team information
- Current team: Voluntari
- Number: 11

Youth career
- –2022: Dinamic Kids Videle
- 2022–2023: Mioveni

Senior career*
Years	Team	Apps	(Gls)
2022–2024	Mioveni	49	(7)
2025–	Voluntari	58	(13)

International career^{‡}
2024–2025	Romania U19	9	(2)
2025–	Romania U20	7	(0)
2026–	Romania U21	2	(0)
- * Club domestic league appearances and goals as of 8 November 2026 ‡ National team caps and goals as of 13 November 2026

Remus Gabriel Guțea (born 2 November 2006) is a Romanian professional footballer who plays as a left winger for Liga I club Voluntari.

== Career statistics ==
As of match played 8 November 2026

Appearances and goals by club, season and competition
Club	Season	League			Cupa României		Europe		Other		Total	
Club	Season	Division	Apps	Goals	Apps	Goals	Apps	Goals	Apps	Goals	Apps	Goals
Mioveni	2022–23	Liga I	7	1	1	0	—		—		8	1
Mioveni	2023–24	Liga II	27	4	1	0	—		2 (Note: Appearance in Liga I promotion/relegation play-offs)	0	30	4
Mioveni	2024–25	Liga II	15	2	0	0	—		—		15	2
Mioveni	Total		49	7	2	0	—		2	0	53	7
Voluntari	2024–25	Liga II	14	0	—		—		1	0	15	0
Voluntari	2025–26	Liga II	29	7	2	0	—		2	0	33	7
Voluntari	2026–27	Liga I	15	6	3	0	—		—		18	6
Voluntari	Total		58	13	5	0	—		3	0	66	13
Career Total			107	20	7	0	—		5	0	119	20
