= Florian Hellstern =

German footballer (born 2007)

Personal information
- Full name: Florian Pascal Hellstern
- Date of birth: 18 October 2007 (age 19)
- Place of birth: Stuttgart, Germany
- Height: 1.88 m (6 ft 2 in)
- Position: Goalkeeper

Team information
- Current team: Greuther Fürth (on loan from VfB Stuttgart)
- Number: 1

Youth career
- FSV Waiblingen
- 2017–2025: VfB Stuttgart

Senior career*
| Years | Team | Apps | (Gls) |
| 2025– | VfB Stuttgart II | 26 | (0) |
| 2026– | VfB Stuttgart | 0 | (0) |
| 2026– | → Greuther Fürth (loan) | 10 | (0) |

International career^{‡}
| 2022–2023 | Germany U16 | 5 | (0) |
| 2023–2024 | Germany U17 | 9 | (0) |
| 2024–2025 | Germany U18 | 4 | (0) |
| 2025–2026 | Germany U19 | 8 | (0) |
| 2026– | Germany U20 | 2 | (0) |
- * Club domestic league appearances and goals as of 2 November 2026 ‡ National team caps and goals as of 2 November 2026

Florian Hellstern (born 18 October 2007) is a German professional footballer who plays as a goalkeeper for Greuther Fürth, on loan from VfB Stuttgart.

== Club career ==
Born in Stuttgart, Hellstern is a youth product of FSV Waiblingen and VfB Stuttgart.

In January 2024, he signed his first professional contract with Stuttgart.

On the summer 2026, after a season where he stood out with the 3. Liga reserve team, earning him a new contract with Stuttgart, he was loaned to Greuther Fürth in the 2. Bundesliga.

Hellstern made his professional debut with Greuther Fürth on 9 August 2026, impressing as a starter in a 1–1 league draw with St. Pauli.

== International career ==
Hellstern is a youth international for Germany, having played for all teams between the under-16 and under-20.

With the under-19s, he played the European Under-19 Championship as a starter in 2026, reaching the final, where they lost to a Spanish team comprising the likes of Espart, Salinas, Pitarch, Morante or Junyent.
