= Croatia national under-19 football team =

National association football team

Croatia U19
- Nickname: Mladi Vatreni (The Young Blazers)
- Association: Croatian Football Federation (HNS)
- Confederation: UEFA (Europe)
- Head coach: Siniša Oreščanin
- Most caps: Teo Kardum (28)
- Top scorer: Nikola Kalinić (11)
- FIFA code: CRO
First colours	Second colours

First international
- Malta 0–4 Croatia (Ta' Qali, Malta; 24 November 1993)

Biggest win
- Croatia 10–0 Andorra (Croatia; 5 November 1997)

Biggest defeat
- Croatia 0–7 Turkey (Antaly, Turkey; 22 November 1994)

U-19 European Championship
- Appearances: 6 (first in 1998)
- Best result: Third place (1998, 2010)
- Website: hns-cff.hr

The Croatia national under-19 football team represents Croatia in international football matches for players aged 19 or under. It is governed by the Croatian Football Federation, the governing body for football in Croatia. It is a member of UEFA in Europe and FIFA in global competitions. The team's colours reference two national symbols: the Croatian checkerboard and the country's tricolour. They are colloquially referred to as the Mladi vatreni ('Young Blazers'). So far, the Mladi vatreni have qualified for six UEFA European Under-19 Championships, namely in 1998, 2000, 2010, 2012 and 2016 and 2026. Croatia won third place twice (1996 and 2010), its greatest success in the tournament so far.

== Recent results and fixtures ==
The following is a list of match results in the last 12 months, as well as any future matches that have been scheduled.

Win Draw Loss Fixture

=== 2026 ===
29 June 2026 2026 Euro Championship	Croatia	1−3	Ukraine	Bangor City Stadium, Bangor Wales, GB
22:00	Barić 22' (pen.)	Report	Bohdanov 26'; Kalyuzhnyi 48'; Lyusin 57'	Referee: Igor Stojchevski (North Macedonia)

2 July 2026 2026 Euro Championship	Croatia	0−0	Italy	The Oval, Caernarfon Wales, GB
14:00 BST		Report

5 July 2026 2026 Euro Championship	Serbia	0−3	Croatia	The Oval, Caernarfon Wales, GB
16:00 BST		Report	Chelfi 9'; Godec 70'; Čović 87' (pen.)

8 July 2026 2026 Euro Championship Semi-finals	Spain	3−0	Croatia	Central Park, Denbigh Wales, GB
22:00	Espart 12'; Salinas 54'; Diallo 83'	Report		Referee: Bence Csonka (Hungary)

== Players ==
=== Current squad ===
The following players were called up for the preliminary 2026 UEFA European Under-19 Championship squad.

No.	Pos.	Player	Date of birth (age)	Club
	GK	Antonio Rajić	4 March 2007 (age 19)	(Croatian Football Federation) Dinamo Zagreb
	GK	Matej Grahovac	26 March 2008 (age 18)	(Croatian Football Federation) Osijek
	GK	Maroje Kostopeč	6 April 2007 (age 19)	(Croatian Football Federation) Lokomotiva
	GK	Vito Kovač	2 April 2008 (age 18)	(Croatian Football Federation) Rijeka
	DF	Kristian Mandić	2 October 2007 (age 19)	(German Football Association) 1. FC Nürnberg
	DF	Raul Kumar	6 February 2008 (age 18)	(Croatian Football Federation) Istra 1961
	DF	Leon Jakirović	16 January 2008 (age 18)	(Italian Football Federation) Inter Milan
	DF	Ljubo Puljić	31 May 2007 (age 19)	(German Football Association) Bayern Munich
	DF	Nikola Radnić	10 June 2008 (age 18)	(Croatian Football Federation) Dinamo Zagreb
	DF	Marko Zebić	8 January 2007 (age 19)	(Croatian Football Federation) Dinamo Zagreb
	DF	Karlo Pajsar	7 March 2008 (age 18)	(Italian Football Federation) Parma
	DF	Roko Gabrić	21 June 2007 (age 19)	(Croatian Football Federation) Hajduk Split
	DF	David Kalem	7 August 2008 (age 18)	(Croatian Football Federation) Osijek
	DF	Noa Mikić	27 January 2007 (age 19)	(Croatian Football Federation) Dinamo Zagreb
	DF	Petar Zvonimir Kostelac	17 March 2008 (age 18)	(Croatian Football Federation) Lokomotiva
	DF	Nikolas Matić	23 June 2008 (age 18)	(German Football Association) VfB Stuttgart
	DF	Lukas Murica	7 August 2008 (age 18)	(Croatian Football Federation) Rijeka
	MF	Matija Subotić	18 December 2007 (age 18)	(Croatian Football Federation) Lokomotiva
	MF	Roko Vojvodić	21 February 2008 (age 18)	(Croatian Football Federation) Hajduk Split
	MF	Marko Zrilić	24 October 2007 (age 19)	(German Football Association) 1. FC Heidenheim
	MF	Tomas Baković	29 March 2007 (age 19)	(Croatian Football Federation) Dinamo Zagreb
	MF	Krešimir Radoš	14 January 2008 (age 18)	(Croatian Football Federation) Dinamo Zagreb
	MF	Silvio Ivanišević Dvornik	28 September 2008 (age 18)	(Croatian Football Federation) Lokomotiva
	MF	Davor Bistre	31 March 2008 (age 18)	(Croatian Football Federation) Hajduk Split
	MF	Duje Slišković	5 August 2008 (age 18)	(German Football Association) Union Berlin
	MF	Pavle Smilajnić	8 May 2008 (age 18)	(Croatian Football Federation) Lokomotiva
	MF	Patrice Čović	25 June 2007 (age 19)	(German Football Association) Werder Bremen
	MF	Niko Horvat	15 July 2008 (age 18)	(German Football Association) Borussia Mönchengladbach
	MF	Anđelo Šutalo	1 January 2007 (age 19)	(Croatian Football Federation) Dinamo Zagreb
	MF	Jona Ježić	8 October 2008 (age 18)	(Croatian Football Federation) Osijek
	FW	Gabrijel Šivalec	5 May 2008 (age 18)	(Croatian Football Federation) Slaven Belupo
	FW	Lovro Chelfi	30 January 2007 (age 19)	(Royal Spanish Football Federation) Barcelona
	FW	Luka Vrzić	5 January 2007 (age 19)	(Croatian Football Federation) Gorica
	FW	Andrija Burcar	19 January 2008 (age 18)	(Italian Football Federation) Parma
	FW	Ivan Križić	10 April 2008 (age 18)	(German Football Association) Hertha BSC
	FW	Tino Kusanović	8 March 2008 (age 18)	(German Football Association) 1. FC Nürnberg
	FW	Dominik Šimić	1 July 2007 (age 19)	(Football Association of Slovenia) Rudar Velenje
	FW	Ivan Barić	10 January 2007 (age 19)	(Croatian Football Federation) Osijek
	FW	Karlo Šimić	10 June 2007 (age 19)	(German Football Association) VfL Wolfsburg
	FW	Dino Godec	18 May 2007 (age 19)	(Croatian Football Federation) Lokomotiva

=== Recent call-ups ===
The following players have also been called up within the last twelve months and remain eligible for future selections.

Pos.	Player	Date of birth (age)	Caps	Goals	Club	Latest call-up

== Competitive record ==
Champions
Runners-up
Third place
Fourth place
Tournament played fully or partially on home soil

Prior to 1990, Croatian players played for the Yugoslavia Under-18 team. Although the Croatian team was formed in the early 1990s after the breakup of Yugoslavia, the Under-18 team had to wait for UEFA to officially accept Croatian Football Federation's membership bid in order to be included in UEFA-governed competitions. Croatia's membership was accepted in June 1993 and the first continental competition Croatia's under-18 team took part in was the qualification for the 1994 European Under-18 Championship. In 2001 UEFA changed the player eligibility dates and from 2002 onwards the continental championship is known as UEFA European Under-19 Championship. The tournament is held every year and serves as the qualifying tournament for FIFA U-20 World Cup which is held every two years.

Croatia's Under-18/19 team managed to qualify for the European championship on four occasions. In 1998 and 2010 they won third place which earned them a place at the 1999 FIFA World Youth Championship and 2011 FIFA U-20 World Cup.

=== UEFA European Under-19 Championship record ===
UEFA European Under-19 Championship record										Qualifications record							
Year	Round	Position	Pld	W	D	L	GF	GA	Squad	GP	W	D	L	GF	GA	Year	
(England) 1948	Part of Yugoslavia																
(Netherlands) 1949	Part of Yugoslavia																
(Austria) 1950	Part of Yugoslavia																
(France) 1951	Part of Yugoslavia																
(Spain) 1952	Part of Yugoslavia																
(Belgium) 1953	Part of Yugoslavia																
(West Germany) 1954	Part of Yugoslavia																
(Italy) 1955	Part of Yugoslavia																
(Hungary) 1956	Part of Yugoslavia																
(Spain) 1957	Part of Yugoslavia																
(Luxembourg) 1958	Part of Yugoslavia																
(Bulgaria) 1959	Part of Yugoslavia																
(Austria) 1960	Part of Yugoslavia																
(Portugal) 1961	Part of Yugoslavia																
(Romania) 1962	Part of Yugoslavia																
(England) 1963	Part of Yugoslavia																
(Netherlands) 1964	Part of Yugoslavia																
(West Germany) 1965	Part of Yugoslavia																
(Socialist Federal Republic of Yugoslavia) 1966	Part of Yugoslavia																
(Turkey) 1967	Part of Yugoslavia																
(France) 1968	Part of Yugoslavia																
(East Germany) 1969	Part of Yugoslavia																
(Scotland) 1970	Part of Yugoslavia																
(Czechoslovakia) 1971	Part of Yugoslavia																
(Spain) 1972	Part of Yugoslavia																
(Italy) 1973	Part of Yugoslavia																
(Sweden) 1974	Part of Yugoslavia																
(Switzerland) 1975	Part of Yugoslavia																
(Hungary) 1976	Part of Yugoslavia																
(Belgium) 1977	Part of Yugoslavia																
(Poland) 1978	Part of Yugoslavia																
(Austria) 1979	Part of Yugoslavia																
(East Germany) 1980	Part of Yugoslavia																
(West Germany) 1981	Part of Yugoslavia																
(Finland) 1982	Part of Yugoslavia																
(England) 1983	Part of Yugoslavia																
(Soviet Union) 1984	Part of Yugoslavia																
(Socialist Federal Republic of Yugoslavia) 1986	Part of Yugoslavia																
(Czechoslovakia) 1988	Part of Yugoslavia																
(Hungary) 1990	Part of Yugoslavia																
(Germany) 1992	Not a UEFA member																
(England) 1993	Not a UEFA member																
(Spain) 1994	Did not qualify									4	2	1	1	12	4	1994	
(Greece) 1995	Did not qualify									2	0	0	2	1	9	1995	
(France) 1996	Did not qualify									2	1	0	1	3	4	1996	
(Iceland) 1997	Did not qualify									4	2	1	1	7	1	1997	
(Cyprus) 1998	Third place	3/8	4	2	1	1	8	5	Squad	4	3	1	0	14	1	1998	
(Sweden) 1999	Did not qualify									5	4	0	1	16	8	1999	
(Germany) 2000	Group stage	8/8	3	0	0	3	3	8	Squad	4	4	0	0	10	1	2000	
(Finland) 2001	Did not qualify									2	1	0	1	2	3	2001	
(Norway) 2002	Did not qualify									3	2	0	1	6	4	2002	
(Liechtenstein) 2003	Did not qualify									3	1	1	1	2	2	2003	
(Switzerland) 2004	Did not qualify									6	5	0	1	13	4	2004	
(Northern Ireland) 2005	Did not qualify									6	2	1	3	11	10	2005	
(Poland) 2006	Did not qualify									6	3	2	1	13	6	2006	2006 elite
(Austria) 2007	Did not qualify									6	3	3	0	13	6	2007	2007 elite
(Czech Republic) 2008	Did not qualify									6	3	2	1	11	7	2008	2008 elite
(Ukraine) 2009	Did not qualify									3	1	1	1	7	6	2009	2009 elite
(France) 2010	Semi-finals	3/8	4	1	1	2	7	4	Squad	6	6	0	0	12	2	2010	2010 elite
(Romania) 2011	Did not qualify									6	2	1	3	8	10	2011	2011 elite
(Estonia) 2012	Group stage	6/8	3	1	1	1	4	2	Squad	6	4	2	0	15	5	2012	2012 elite
(Lithuania) 2013	Did not qualify									6	3	3	0	15	5	2013	2013 elite
(Hungary) 2014	Did not qualify									3	1	1	1	9	5	2014	2014 elite
(Greece) 2015	Did not qualify									6	2	3	1	8	6	2015	
(Germany) 2016	Group stage	8/8	3	0	0	3	2	7	Squad	6	5	1	0	13	2	2016	
(Georgia (country)) 2017	Did not qualify									6	4	1	1	14	3	2017	
(Finland) 2018	Did not qualify									3	1	1	1	5	5	2018	
(Armenia) 2019	Did not qualify									6	2	2	2	10	9	2019	
(Northern Ireland) 2020	Tournament and elite qualifying round cancelled due to COVID-19 pandemic									3	2	1	0	5	2	2020	
(Romania) 2021	Tournament and qualifying round cancelled due to COVID-19 pandemic																
(Slovakia) 2022	Did not qualify									6	3	1	2	13	5	2022	
(Malta) 2023	Did not qualify									6	2	1	3	12	9	2023	
(Northern Ireland) 2024	Did not qualify									6	3	1	2	7	5	2024	
(Romania) 2025	Did not qualify									6	2	0	4	8	8	2025	
(Wales) 2026	Semi-finals	TBD	2	0	1	1	1	3	Squad	6	5	1	0	20	3	2026	
(Czech Republic) 2027	To be determined									3	1	0	2	1	6	2027	
(Bulgaria) 2028	To be determined									To be determined						2028	
(Netherlands) 2029	To be determined									To be determined						2029	
Total	Third place	5/70	19	4	4	11	25	29		156	85	33	38	316	166		

Draws include knockout matches decided via penalty shoot-out; correct as of 31 March 2026 after the match against France.

Matches
First match	Croatia 2–5 Republic of Ireland (Ayia Napa, Cyprus; 19 July 1998)
Biggest win	Portugal 0–5 Croatia (Bayeux, France; 24 July 2010)
Biggest defeat	Croatia 2–5 Republic of Ireland (Ayia Napa, Cyprus; 19 July 1998)
Biggest defeat	Netherlands 3–0 Croatia (Ludwigsburg, Germany; 17 July 2000)

== Head-to-head record ==
Key

More wins than losses
As many wins as losses
Fewer wins than losses

Correct as of 8 July 2026, after the match against Spain.

Opponent	Pld	W	D	L	GF	GA	GD	Win %
Albania	3	2	0	1	3	1	+2	66.67
Andorra	1	1	0	0	10	0	+10	100.00
Armenia	3	3	0	0	8	1	+7	100.00
Australia	1	1	0	0	2	0	+2	100.00
Austria	9	4	3	2	13	8	+5	44.44
Azerbaijan	6	2	3	1	14	6	+8	33.33
Belarus	2	2	0	0	4	1	+3	100.00
Belgium	6	2	2	2	11	8	+3	33.33
Bosnia and Herzegovina	14	7	6	1	24	10	+14	50.00
Brazil	2	0	0	2	1	5	−4	0.00
Bulgaria	6	4	1	1	11	6	+5	66.67
China	6	5	0	1	10	3	+7	83.33
Cyprus	3	2	1	0	9	2	+7	66.67
Czech Republic	15	1	6	8	19	30	−11	6.67
Denmark	1	0	0	1	2	5	−3	0.00
England	9	1	4	4	9	13	−4	11.11
Estonia	6	4	1	1	9	6	+3	66.67
Faroe Islands	4	3	1	0	15	2	+13	75.00
Finland	4	3	0	1	9	5	+4	75.00
France	11	1	4	6	7	18	−11	9.09
Georgia	6	4	0	2	9	4	+5	66.67
Germany	7	2	1	4	10	15	−5	28.57
Gibraltar	3	3	0	0	22	0	+22	100.00
Greece	6	1	4	1	7	7	+0	16.67
Hungary	19	10	6	3	31	19	+12	52.63
Iceland	6	5	1	0	17	7	+10	83.33
India	1	1	0	0	5	0	+5	100.00
Indonesia	1	1	0	0	7	1	+6	100.00
Israel	3	2	1	0	5	0	+5	66.67
Italy	13	4	5	4	15	17	−2	30.77
Japan	4	2	0	2	5	11	−6	50.00
Kazakhstan	3	3	0	0	8	0	+8	100.00
Latvia	6	5	1	0	16	5	+11	83.33
Liechtenstein	1	1	0	0	6	0	+6	100.00
Lithuania	2	2	0	0	4	1	+3	100.00
Luxembourg	3	2	0	1	5	3	+2	66.67
Malta	4	4	0	0	18	1	+17	100.00
Mexico	2	0	1	1	1	2	−1	0.00
Moldova	2	2	0	0	7	0	+7	100.00
Montenegro	6	4	1	1	10	4	+6	66.67
Netherlands	6	1	2	3	4	8	−4	16.67
New Zealand	1	1	0	0	2	1	+1	100.00
North Macedonia	4	2	2	0	10	3	+7	50.00
Northern Ireland	1	1	0	0	2	1	+1	100.00
Norway	4	2	0	2	5	5	+0	50.00
Philippines	1	1	0	0	9	0	+9	100.00
Poland	6	2	1	3	5	4	+1	33.33
Portugal	7	1	1	5	10	12	−2	14.29
Qatar	5	3	0	2	12	2	+10	60.00
Republic of Ireland	5	0	2	3	7	13	−6	0.00
Romania	6	2	1	3	7	9	−2	33.33
Russia	3	1	2	0	5	3	+2	33.33
San Marino	2	2	0	0	11	1	+10	100.00
Saudi Arabia	2	1	0	1	5	5	+0	50.00
Scotland	5	3	2	0	8	2	+6	60.00
Serbia	10	4	2	4	16	15	+1	40.00
Slovakia	17	10	5	2	36	19	+17	58.82
Slovenia	27	17	4	6	43	26	+17	62.96
South Korea	2	1	1	0	6	2	+4	50.00
Spain	6	1	1	4	4	14	−10	16.67
Sweden	7	1	5	1	7	8	−1	14.29
Switzerland	8	3	4	1	11	6	+5	37.50
Turkey	12	3	4	5	11	21	−10	25.00
Ukraine	2	0	0	2	2	5	−3	0.00
United States	1	0	0	1	3	4	−1	0.00
Uzbekistan	1	0	1	0	1	1	+0	0.00
Wales	1	1	0	0	2	0	+2	100.00
67 teams played	362	170	93	99	642	418	+224	46.96

== See also ==
- Croatia national football team
- Croatia national football B team
- Croatia national under-23 football team
- Croatia national under-21 football team
- Croatia national under-20 football team
- Croatia national under-18 football team
- Croatia national under-17 football team
- Croatia national under-16 football team
- Croatia national under-15 football team
- Croatia women's national football team
- Croatia women's national under-19 football team
- Croatia women's national under-17 football team
- Croatia women's national under-15 football team
