= Sergio Esteban =

Spanish footballer (born 2007)

Personal information
- Full name: Sergio Esteban Sánchez
- Date of birth: 20 March 2007 (age 19)
- Place of birth: Málaga, Spain
- Height: 1.93 m (6 ft 4 in)
- Position: Forward

Team information
- Current team: Atlético Madrid
- Number: 45

Youth career
- –2019: Villarreal
- 2019–: Atlético Madrid

Senior career*
Years	Team	Apps	(Gls)
2025–	Atlético Madrid	0	(0)
2025–	Atlético Madrid B	2	(0)

International career^{‡}
2025	Spain U18	1	(0)
2025–	Spain U19	8	(3)
Medal record
Men's football
Representing Spain
UEFA European Under-19 Championship
Winner	2026 Wales
- * Club domestic league appearances and goals as of 25 May 2026 ‡ National team caps and goals as of 19 February 2026

Sergio Esteban Sánchez (born 20 March 2007) is a Spanish professional footballer who plays as a forward for Atlético Madrid.

== Early life ==
Esquivel was born on 20 March 2007 in Málaga, Spain. The son of Spanish footballer Paco Esteban, he is the younger brother of Spanish footballer Paco Esteban.

== Club career ==
As a youth player, Esteban joined the youth academy of Villarreal. Following his stint there, he joined the youth academy of La Liga side Atlético Madrid ahead of the 2019–20 season, where he played in the UEFA Youth League and was promoted to the club's senior team in 2026.

== International career ==
Esteban is a Spain youth international. On 15 January 2025, he debuted for the Spain under-18s during a 0–0 away friendly draw with Italy.

== Style of play ==
Esteban plays as a forward. Spanish newspaper Diario AS wrote in 2026 that he is "a striker with a long stride, speed, constant movement off the ball, and a powerful shot".

== Honours ==
Spain U19

- UEFA European Under-19 Championship: 2026
