= Francisco Esteban =

Francisco Esteban or Paco Esteban may refer to:

- Francisco Esteban Gómez (1783-1853), Venezuelan military officer
- Paco Esteban (footballer, born 1981), Spanish football forward
- Paco Esteban (footballer, born 2006), Spanish football striker for Betis B
