= Jesús Fortea =

Spanish footballer (born 2007)

Personal information
- Full name: Jesús Fortea Tejedo
- Date of birth: 26 March 2007 (age 19)
- Place of birth: Albal, Spain
- Height: 1.75 m (5 ft 9 in)
- Position: Right-back

Team information
- Current team: Real Madrid B
- Number: 2

Youth career
- 2014–2019: Levante
- 2019–2022: Atlético Madrid
- 2022–: Real Madrid

Senior career*
Years	Team	Apps	(Gls)
2024–2025	Real Madrid C	5	(0)
2025–	Real Madrid B	18	(0)

International career^{‡}
2022	Spain U15	6	(0)
2021–2023	Spain U16	9	(1)
2022–2024	Spain U17	12	(0)
2025	Spain U18	1	(0)
2024–	Spain U19	15	(1)
2025	Spain U20	5	(0)
Medal record
Men's football
Representing Spain
UEFA European Under-19 Championship
Winner	2026 Wales
- * Club domestic league appearances and goals as of 09:23, 22 May 2026 (UTC) ‡ National team caps and goals as of 31 March 2026

Jesús Fortea Tejedo (born 26 March 2007) is a Spanish footballer who plays as a right-back for Real Madrid Castilla.

== Early life ==
Fortea was born in Albal, Spain on 26 March 2007 to Jesús Fortea Sr, who worked in transport, and Isabel Tejedo, who worked in administration. A native of the Valencian Community, Spain, he started playing football at the age of four.

== Club career ==
As a youth player, Fortea joined the youth academy of Levante. In 2019, he joined the youth academy of La Liga side Atlético Madrid at the age of twelve. Three years later, he joined the youth academy of La Liga side Real Madrid. In June 2025, he extended his contract with the club until 2029 and officially promoted to Real Madrid Castilla.

== International career ==
Fortea represented Spain internationally at youth level. At the age of fourteen, and he played for the Spain national under-16 football team and played for the Spain national under-17 football team at the age of fifteen. Subsequently, he played for the Spain national under-19 football team for the 2025 UEFA European Under-19 Championship qualification.

== Style of play ==
Fortea plays as a right-back and is right-footed. Spanish newspaper Diario AS wrote in 2022 that he is an "explosive right-back, very fast, with fantastic one-on-one skills and a magnificent dribble".

== Honours ==
Spain U19

- UEFA European Under-19 Championship: 2026
