= Ukraine national under-19 football team =

Sports team

Ukraine Under-19
- Association: Ukrainian Association of Football
- Confederation: UEFA (Europe)
- Head coach: Oleh Luzhny
- Captain: Yehor Sherstiuk
- Most caps: Denys Harmash (27)
- Top scorer: Dmytro Korkishko (15)
- FIFA code: UKR
First colours	Second colours

First international
- Ukraine 3–0 Andorra (2001)

Biggest win
- San Marino 0–6 Ukraine; San Marino; (26 September 2006); Myanmar 0–6 Ukraine; Whangārei, New Zealand; (2 June 2015)

Biggest defeat
- Spain 3–0 Ukraine (20 August 2006)

European Championship
- Appearances: 6 (first in 2004)
- Best result: Champions (2009)

The Ukraine national under-19 football team (Ukrainian: Юнацька збірна України з футболу (U-19)) also known as the Junior football team of Ukraine represents Ukraine in international football in the UEFA European Under-19 Football Championship and finals of the FIFA U-20 World Cup.

It is formed by its head coach who is appointed and directed by the Ukrainian Association of Football, the governing body for football in Ukraine.

- Ukraine national under-18 football team, immediate reserve and formerly the main team before 2002
- Ukraine national under-20 football team, special team that is formed only for the FIFA U-20 World Cup upon successful performance of Ukraine U-19

== Overview ==
Ukraine national under-19 football team is the second youth national football team in the country after the national under-21 football team. Previously it was known as Ukraine national under-18 football team before competitions shifted back in 1999. The team represents Ukraine at the continental championship for under-19 national teams (previously under-18). Most often a lot of its players formerly participated in continental and World competitions for national under-17 football teams. Upon a successful performance at the European championship for the under-19 teams it qualifies for the FIFA U-20 World Cup that is organized for teams of under-20.

Ukraine national under-19 football team has good traditions which it inherited from its parent Soviet national youth football team providing such players like Serhiy Scherbakov and Oleg Salenko for the Ukraine main national team.

The under-19 football team has its reserve team known as under-18 football team that also participates in preparations to the under-19 football competitions.

Until 2002 the team played as the national under-18 football team for Ukraine. Its first game it played in 1994 away against Israel losing it 0–2.

=== Honours ===
- Continental competitions (UEFA European Under-19 Championship):
  - champions (1): 2009
- 2005 FIFA Bronze Shoe Award: Oleksandr Aliev
- 2009 UEFA Golden Player Award: Kyrylo Petrov
- 2015 FIFA Golden Shoe Award: Viktor Kovalenko
- 2015 FIFA Fair Play Award

== Tournaments ==
=== Official ===
- FIFA U-20 World Cup (as under-20 team)
- UEFA European Under-19 Football Championship

=== Invitationals ===
- Valentin Granatkin Memorial (friendly in Saint Petersburg)
- Copa del Atlantico (for under-18)
- Memorial Stevan Cele Vilotic

=== Official tournaments ===
Unlike the under-21 team, the continental competitions for under-19 take place on annual basis starting from 1992.

==== European championship ====
Under-18 competitions

Under-19 competitions

UEFA European Under-19 Championship record									Qualification record					
Year	Round	GP	W	D*	L	GF	GA	Squad	GP	W	D	L	GF	GA
(Norway) 2002	did not qualify								3	1	0	2	4	4
(Liechtenstein) 2003	did not qualify								3	2	0	1	8	3
(Switzerland) 2004	Semi-finals	4	1	3	0	3	2	Squad	6	4	1	1	12	7
(Northern Ireland) 2005	did not qualify								6	4	0	2	8	7
(Poland) 2006	did not qualify								6	4	0	2	8	7
(Austria) 2007	did not qualify								3	1	1	1	3	2
(Czech Republic) 2008	did not qualify								6	4	0	2	10	6
(Ukraine) 2009	Champions	5	3	2	0	8	3	Squad	Qualified as hosts					
(France) 2010	did not qualify								6	3	2	1	8	4
(Romania) 2011	did not qualify								6	2	2	2	5	4
(Estonia) 2012	did not qualify								6	4	1	1	11	4
(Lithuania) 2013	did not qualify								6	3	1	2	11	5
(Hungary) 2014	Group stage	3	1	1	1	2	3	Squad	6	4	2	0	13	2
(Greece) 2015	Group stage	3	0	1	2	3	7	Squad	6	4	2	0	19	6
(Germany) 2016	did not qualify								6	3	1	2	14	8
(Georgia (country)) 2017	did not qualify								6	3	0	3	9	7
(Finland) 2018	Semi-finals	4	2	1	1	4	7	Squad	6	5	1	0	11	3
(Armenia) 2019	did not qualify								6	3	1	2	14	10
(Northern Ireland) ~~2020~~	Tournament Canceled								Tournament Canceled					
(Romania) ~~2021~~	Tournament Canceled								Tournament Canceled					
(Slovakia) 2022	did not qualify								6	4	2	0	14	9
(Malta) 2023	did not qualify								6	3	0	3	9	9
(Northern Ireland) 2024	Semi-finals	4	1	2	1	3	3	Squad	6	5	0	1	15	5
(Romania) 2025	did not qualify								3	0	0	3	1	4
(Wales) 2026	Semi-finals	4	3	0	1	7	4	Squad	6	5	1	0	14	1
(Czech Republic) 2027	Qualification in progress in Round 3 League A								5	3	0	2	10	7
Total:7/21	1 Title	27	11	10	6	30	29		124	74	17	33	240	123

== Head coaches ==
- 1999–2001 Anatoliy Kroshchenko
- 2001 Valentyn Lutsenko
- 2001–2002 Oleksandr Ryabokon
- 2002 Pavlo Yakovenko
- 2002–2005 Yuriy Kalitvintsev
- 2009 Yuriy Kalitvintsev
- 2010–2012 Oleh Kuznetsov
- 2012–2013 Yuriy Moroz
- 2012–2016 Oleksandr Holovko
- 2015–2016 Oleh Kuznetsov
- 2016–2017 Volodymyr Tsytkin
- 2017 Volodymyr Yezerskyi
- 2017–2018 Oleksandr Petrakov
- 2019 Serhiy Nahornyak
- 2021–2022 Volodymyr Yezerskyi
- 2022–2023 Serhiy Nahornyak
- 2023 Oleh Kuznetsov
- 2024–2026 Dmytro Mykhaylenko U-19 (born 2007)
- 2026- Oleh Luzhnyi U-19 (born 2007)
- 2026– Oleksandr Sytnik U-18/U-19 (born 2008)

== Recent results ==
=== 2024 UEFA European Under-19 Championship ===
==== Group 7 ====
Pos	Team	Pld	W	D	L	GF	GA	GD	Pts	Promotion
1	Ukraine	3	3	0	0	8	0	+8	9	Qualified for the final tournament
2	Switzerland	3	2	0	1	3	3	0	6	
3	Latvia	3	0	1	2	1	5	−4	1	
4	North Macedonia (H)	3	0	1	2	1	5	−4	1	

Updated to match(es) played on 26 March 2024. Source: UEFA
Rules for classification: Qualification tiebreakers
(H) Hosts

== Results and fixtures ==
=== 2025 ===
12 November 2025 2026 Euro qualification	Ukraine	3–0	Albania	Niko Dovana Stadium, Durrës, Albania
14:00	Redushko 34'; Popov 74'; Kamenskyi 88'	Report		Attendance: 200; Referee: Joakim Östling (Sweden)

15 November 2025 2026 Euro qualification	Ukraine	3–0	Montenegro	Egnatia Arena, Rrogozhinë, Albania
12:00	Redushko 13'; Popov 27'; Kamenskyi 37'	Report		Referee: Christos Vergetis (Greece)

18 November 2025 2026 Euro qualification	Ukraine	3–0	Slovakia	Egnatia Arena, Rrogozhinë, Albania
14:00	Bohdanov 17'; Dihtyar 33'; Balog 45+1' (o.g.)	Report		Referee: Christos Vergetis (Greece)

=== 2026 ===
25 March 2026 2026 Euro qualification	Ukraine	1–0	Northern Ireland	Football Centre FRF, Buftea, Romania
10:00	Soroka 47'	Report		Referee: Lukasz Kuzma (Poland)

25 March 2026 2027 Euro qualification	Ukraine	1–2	Finland	Mustapekka Areena, Helsinki, Finland
17:00	Zudin 74'	Report	Palmula 32'; Katz 60' (pen.)	Referee: Kristaps Ratnieks (Latvia)

28 March 2026 2026 Euro qualification	Ukraine	3–0	Kazakhstan	Football Centre FRF, Buftea, Romania
10:00	Tyutyunov 44'; Kamenskyi 72'; Bohdanov 85'	Report		Referee: Joey Kooij (The Netherlands)

28 March 2026 2027 Euro qualification	Czech Republic	3–1	Ukraine	Mustapekka Areena, Helsinki, Finland
17:00	Jadrníček 7'; Janega 69'; Frolík 90+3'	Report	Zudin 35' (pen.)	Referee: Georgi Ginchev (Bulgaria)

31 March 2026 2027 Euro qualification	Estonia	0–4	Ukraine	Helsinki Olympic Stadium, Helsinki, Finland
12:00		Report	Liusin 19'; Bodnar 28'; Glyut 43'; Balakai 79'	Referee: Georgi Ginchev (Bulgaria)

31 March 2026 2026 Euro qualification	Romania	1–1	Ukraine	Anghel Iordănescu Stadium, Voluntari, Romania
16:00	Toma 26'	Report	Kamenskyi 85'	Attendance: 123; Referee: Joey Kooij (The Netherlands)

29 June 2026 2026 Euro Championship	Croatia	1−3	Ukraine	Bangor City Stadium, Bangor, Wales GB
22:00	Barić 22' (pen.)	Report	Bohdanov 26'; Kalyuzhnyi 48'; Lyusin 57'	Referee: Igor Stojchevski (North Macedonia)

2 July 2026 2026 Euro Championship	Serbia	1−2	Ukraine	Bangor City Stadium, Bangor, Wales GB
20:00	Ranković 16'	Report	Glyut 32', 36'	Attendance: 859; Referee: Sam Barrott (England)

5 July 2026 2026 Euro Championship	Ukraine	1–0	Italy	Bangor City Stadium, Bangor, Wales GB
18:00	Olychenko 30'	Report

8 July 2026 2026 Euro Championship	Ukraine	1–2	Germany	Racecourse Ground, Wrexham, Wales GB
17:00

24 September 2026 Friendly	Sweden	2–1	Ukraine	Estadi Olímpic Camilo Cano. La Nucía, Spain
16:00	Benjamin Brantlind 11', 76'		Oleksandr Dyedov 54'

27 September 2026 Friendly	Germany	0–0	Ukraine	Estadio Municipal Guillermo Amor (Benidorm), Spain
16:00

30 September 2026 Friendly	Scotland	0–2	Ukraine	Estadio Municipal Guillermo Amor (Benidorm), Spain
12:00

11 November 2026 2027 Euro Championship qualification	Ukraine	3–2	Israel	Stadio Bruno Recchioni, Fermo
16:00	Diedov 13', 86'; Tkachenko 87'	Report	N. Cohen 10'; Simon 40'	Referee: Tom Owen (Wales)

14 November 2026 2027 Euro Championship qualification	Italy	0–1	Ukraine	Stadio Raffaele Mancini, Fano
15:30			Diedov 19'

17 November 2026 2027 Euro Championship qualification	Romania	1–0	Ukraine	Stadio del Conero, Ancona
14:00	Pellegrini 87'	Report		Referee: Mathieu Vernice (France)

== Players ==
=== Current squad ===
The following players were called up for the friendly matches against Sweden, Germany and Scotland on 24, 27 and 30 September 2026; respectively.

Caps and goals correct as of 27 September 2026, following the match against Germany.

No.	Pos.	Player	Date of birth (age)	Caps	Goals	Club
1	GK	Rostyslav Bahlay	1 February 2008 (age 18)	1	0	(Ukrainian Association of Football) Shakhtar Donetsk
12	GK	Denys Talko	25 May 2008 (age 18)	1	0	(Ukrainian Association of Football) Polissya Zhytomyr
23	GK	Ostap Mykhailyuk	14 March 2008 (age 18)	0	0	(Portuguese Football Federation) Rio Ave
2	DF	Glib Katkov	14 December 2008 (age 17)	1	0	(Georgian Football Federation) Torpedo Kutaisi
3	DF	Danylo Ohorodnyk	22 October 2008 (age 18)	4	0	(Ukrainian Association of Football) Dynamo Kyiv
4	DF	Stanislav Tolstolys	28 June 2008 (age 18)	0	0	(Portuguese Football Federation) Nacional
5	DF	Nikita Kalyuzhnyi	7 February 2008 (age 18)	11	1	(Ukrainian Association of Football) Shakhtar Donetsk
6	DF	Yehor Sherstyuk	15 September 2008 (age 18)	6	0	(Ukrainian Association of Football) Metalist Kharkiv
10	DF	Artem Muradyan	20 February 2008 (age 18)	5	0	(German Football Association) Borussia Mönchengladbach
13	DF	Nazar Ivaskiv	11 March 2008 (age 18)	2	0	(Ukrainian Association of Football) Dynamo Kyiv
7	MF	Patryk Sykut	15 July 2008 (age 18)	6	0	(The Football Association) Peterborough United
9	MF	Illia Kutia	7 March 2008 (age 18)	4	0	(Croatian Football Federation) Hajduk Split
11	MF	Dmytro Sukhonos	19 May 2008 (age 18)	1	0	(Ukrainian Association of Football) Kolos Kovalivka
16	MF	Andriy Korol	2 July 2008 (age 18)	2	0	(Ukrainian Association of Football) Kharkiv
17	MF	Oleksandr Tkachenko	28 February 2008 (age 18)	2	0	(German Football Association) Werder Bremen
20	MF	Mukhammad Dzhurabaev	4 February 2008 (age 18)	4	0	(Ukrainian Association of Football) Rukh Lviv
21	MF	Adam Huram	17 March 2009 (age 17)	2	0	(Croatian Football Federation) Hajduk Split
	MF	Pavlo Lyusin	23 February 2008 (age 18)	8	2	(Ukrainian Association of Football) Dynamo Kyiv
14	FW	Vitaliy Glyut	29 April 2008 (age 18)	9	4	(United States Soccer Federation) Chicago Fire
15	FW	Ivan Bagriy	22 March 2008 (age 18)	2	0	(Ukrainian Association of Football) Kharkiv
18	FW	Danylo Tarasenko	18 January 2008 (age 18)	2	0	(Bulgarian Football Union) CSKA 1948
19	FW	Oleksandr Dyedov	19 June 2008 (age 18)	2	1	(Ukrainian Association of Football) Karpaty Lviv
22	FW	Yuriy Kisak	15 March 2008 (age 18)	1	0	(Royal Spanish Football Federation) Villarreal

=== Recent call-ups ===
The following players have also been called up for the team recently, and remain eligible for selection.

Pos.	Player	Date of birth (age)	Caps	Goals	Club	Latest call-up
GK	Kyrylo Khadasevych	26 July 2008 (age 18)	1	0		UEFA U-19 EURO preliminary squad
GK	Fedir Tkachenko	14 August 2008 (age 18)	2	0	(Spain) Calavera	UEFA U-19 EURO preliminary squad
DF	Yaroslav Mylokost	8 February 2008 (age 18)	10	0	(Ukraine) Shakhtar Donetsk	UEFA U-19 EURO
DF	Bohdan Levytskyi	5 January 2009 (age 17)	1	0	(Ukraine) Rukh Lviv	UEFA U-19 EURO preliminary squad
DF	Yehor Kostyuk	1 June 2008 (age 18)	2	0	(Ukraine) Shakhtar Donetsk	UEFA U-19 EURO preliminary squad
DF	Yehor Onishchuk	4 June 2009 (age 17)	3	0	(Ukraine) Shakhtar Donetsk	UEFA U-19 EURO preliminary squad
DF	Arsen Zalypka	9 May 2008 (age 18)	2	0	(Ukraine) Rukh Lviv	UEFA U-19 EURO preliminary squad
DF	Mykyta Melnyk	8 January 2008 (age 18)	2	0	(Italy) Napoli	UEFA U-19 EURO preliminary squad
MF	Mykola Petrovskyi	31 March 2008 (age 18)	3	0	(Germany) VfB Stuttgart	UEFA U-19 EURO preliminary squad
MF	Oleksandr Balakay	11 April 2008 (age 18)	2	1	(Ukraine) Shakhtar Donetsk	UEFA U-19 EURO preliminary squad
FW	Artem Zubriy	7 April 2008 (age 18)	3	0	(Ukraine) Shakhtar Donetsk	UEFA U-19 EURO preliminary squad
FW	Ivan Andreyko	11 March 2008 (age 18)	2	0	(Ukraine) Dynamo Kyiv	UEFA U-19 EURO preliminary squad
FW	Matviy Bodnar	2 February 2008 (age 18)	3	1	(Ukraine) Kryvbas Kryvyi Rih	UEFA U-19 EURO preliminary squad
FW	Dmytro Zudin	9 July 2008 (age 18)	2	2	(Croatia) Hajduk Split	UEFA U-19 EURO preliminary squad
FW	Kirill Serdyuk	28 January 2009 (age 17)	3	0	(Germany) VfB Stuttgart	UEFA U-19 EURO preliminary squad
Notes: ^{INJ} = Player withdrew from the squad because of injury.

== Honours ==
- UEFA European Under-19 Championship: 2009

== See also ==
- Ukraine (Senior) team
- Ukraine Under-21 team
