= Jykese Fields =

German footballer (born 2007)

Personal information
- Date of birth: 14 June 2007 (age 19)
- Place of birth: Minot, North Dakota, United States
- Height: 1.88 m (6 ft 2 in)
- Positions: Midfielder; winger; forward

Team information
- Current team: TSG 1899 Hoffenheim
- Number: 46

Youth career
- FC Germania Hütschenhausen
- –2020: FK Pirmasens
- 2020–2023: Norwich City FC
- 2023–2026: TSG 1899 Hoffenheim

Senior career*
Years	Team	Apps	(Gls)
2025–	TSG 1899 Hoffenheim II	14	(1)
2026–	TSG 1899 Hoffenheim	1	(0)

International career^{‡}
2024	United States U19	2	(2)
2025–	Germany U19	11	(2)
- * Club domestic league appearances and goals as of 8 November 2026 ‡ National team caps and goals as of 11 July 2026

Jykese Fields (born 14 June 2007) is a professional footballer who plays as a midfielder, winger or forward for TSG 1899 Hoffenheim. Born in Germany, he has represented the United States and Germany internationally at youth level.

== Club career ==
As a youth player, Fields joined the youth academy of German side FC Germania Hütschenhausen. Following his stint there, he joined the youth academy of FK Pirmasens in Germany.

Subsequently, he joined the youth academy of English outfit Norwich City FC in 2020. Ahead of the 2023–24 season, he joined the youth academy of TSG 1899 Hoffenheim in the German Bundesliga, where he captained the club's under-19 team and was regarded as one of their most important players. On 31 October 2026, he debuted for their senior team during a 0–2 away loss to SV Werder Bremen in the league.

== International career ==
Fields is a United States and Germany youth international and has represented the former internationally at under-19 level and the latter internationally at under-19 level. Altogether, he made two appearances and scored two goals while playing for the United States men's national under-19 soccer team.

During the spring of 2026, he played for the Germany national under-19 football team for 2026 UEFA European Under-19 Championship qualification. The same year, he played for the Germany national under-19 football team at the 2026 UEFA European Under-19 Championship.

== Style of play ==
Fields plays as a midfielder, winger or forward American news website U.S. Soccer Collective wrote in 2026 that he "is a center-forward with an ideal blend of size and speed and a relentless runner off the ball".
