= Bohdan Olychenko =

Ukrainian footballer (born 2007)

Bohdan Olychenko Богдан Оличенко
Personal information
- Full name: Bohdan Ruslanovych Olychenko
- Date of birth: 18 January 2007 (age 19)
- Place of birth: Lutsk, Ukraine
- Position: Midfielder

Team information
- Current team: Bayern Munich II

Youth career
- –2022: Shakhtar Donetsk
- 2022–: Bayern Munich

Senior career*
Years	Team	Apps	(Gls)
2024–	Bayern Munich II	11	(1)

International career^{‡}
2023–2024	Ukraine U17	5	(0)
2026–	Ukraine U19	5	(1)
- * Club domestic league appearances and goals as of 18 October 2026 ‡ National team caps and goals as of 8 July 2026

Bohdan Ruslanovych Olychenko (Ukrainian: Богдан Русланович Оличенко; born 18 January 2007) is a Ukrainian professional footballer who plays as a midfielder for Regionalliga Bayern club Bayern Munich II.

== Club career ==
Olychenko is a youth product of Shakhtar Dontesk, he then joined the youth academy of German Bundesliga giants Bayern Munich in 2022.

He received his first ever call-up with Bayern Munich II on 13 September 2024, during a 2–2 home draw Regionalliga Bayern match against TSV Aubstadt. The next month, on 3 October, he was called-up again, this time in a 2–0 away win Regionalliga Bayern match against FC Eintracht Bamberg, both matches during the 2024–25 season, as an unused substitute however.

On early 2025, Olychenko extended his contract with Bayern Munich until 2027, along with teammates Tim Binder and Raphael Pavlić.

He was one of the players that were called up by Bayern Munich's first team head coach Vincent Kompany for the last 2025 pre-season friendly match against Red Eagles Austria on 23 August 2025, for which he started during a 3–1 win.

He was called-up with Bayern Munich II during the 2025–26 season for the first time on 21 March 2026, in a 1–1 away draw Regionalliga Bayern match against Greuther Fürth II, although he did not make his professional debut. A month later Olychenko made his professional debut, substituting Kurt Rüger at the 46th minute of a 4–1 away loss Regionalliga Bayern match against 1. FC Nürnberg II, on 21 April. He made his first start with Bayern Munich II during a 1–1 home draw Regionalliga Bayern match against VfB Eichstätt, on May 8.

== International career ==
Olychenko is a Ukraine youth international, having represented the under-17s and under-19s. He was called up with the U19s for the 2026 UEFA European Under-19 Championship in Wales between 28 June – 11 July 2026.

== Career statistics ==
As of match played 18 October 2026

Appearances and goals by club, season and competition
Club	Season	League			Cup		Total	
Club	Season	Division	Apps	Goals	Apps	Goals	Apps	Goals
Bayern Munich II	2024–25	Regionalliga Bayern	0	0	—		0	0
Bayern Munich II	2025–26	Regionalliga Bayern	2	0	—		2	0
Bayern Munich II	2026–27	Regionalliga Bayern	9	1	—		9	1
Bayern Munich II	Total		11	1	—		11	1
Career Total			11	1	0	0	11	1
