= Quim Junyent =

Spanish footballer (born 2007)

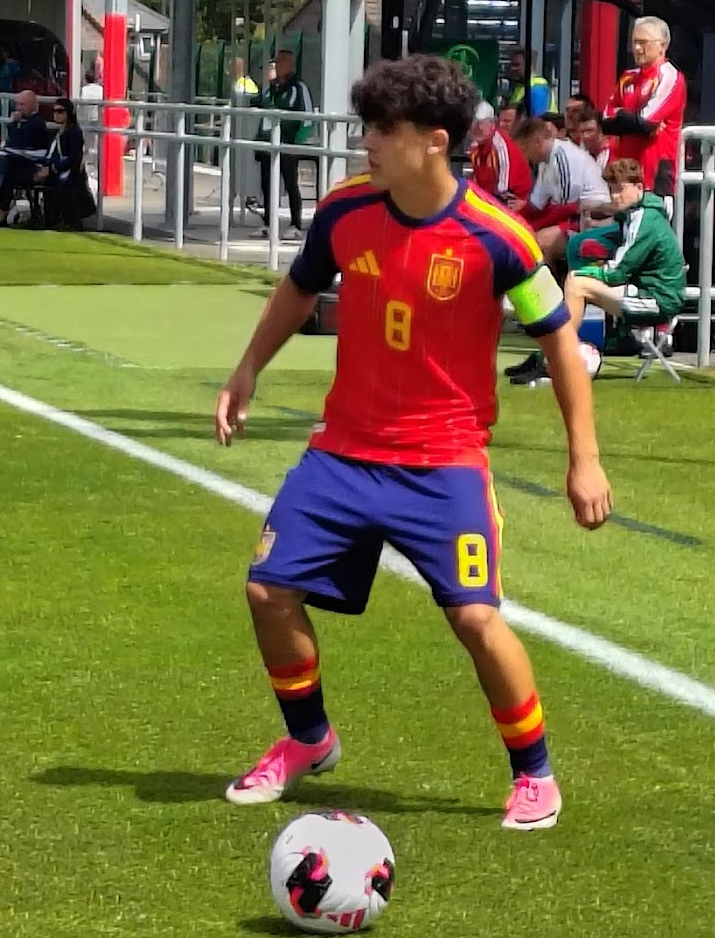
- Junyent with Spain U19 in 2026

Personal information
- Full name: Joaquim Junyent Casanova
- Date of birth: 25 March 2007 (age 19)
- Place of birth: Balsareny, Spain
- Height: 1.71 m (5 ft 7 in)
- Position: Midfielder

Team information
- Current team: Almería
- Number: 33

Youth career
- Gimnàstic Manresa
- 2016–2026: Barcelona

Senior career*
Years	Team	Apps	(Gls)
2024–2026	Barcelona B	7	(0)
2026–	Almería	1	(0)

International career^{‡}
2021−2022	Spain U15	7	(1)
2022−2023	Spain U16	9	(2)
2022−2024	Spain U17	15	(2)
2023−2025	Spain U18	6	(1)
2025–	Spain U19	22	(4)
Medal record
Men's football
Representing Spain
UEFA European Under-19 Championship
Winner	2026 Wales
Runner-up	2025 Romania
- * Club domestic league appearances and goals as of 17 August 2026 ‡ National team caps and goals as of 26 June 2025 (UTC)

Joaquim "Quim" Junyent Casanova (born 25 March 2007) is a Spanish professional footballer who plays as a midfielder for Segunda División club Almería.

== Club career ==
=== Barcelona ===
Born in Balsareny, Barcelona, Catalonia, Junyent began his career with Club Gimnàstic de Manresa before joining Barcelona's La Masia in 2016, aged nine. He made his senior debut with the reserves on 25 August 2024, coming on as a second-half substitute for Juan Hernández in a 1–1 Primera Federación home draw against Real Unión.

Quim Junyent went on that season to win the youth treble - Youth Champions League, Juvenil Copa Del Rey and the U19 league with Barcelona Juvenil A, he played a total of 45 games with 5 goals and at least 5 assists in all competitions, also nearly winning the Youth Champions League season MVP with multiple stats leading fellow players.

In the following season, Quim Junyent suffered injuries in the first half of the season, during which he played 6 games for B team in the Segunda Federacion and a couple of matches in YCL. In January 2026, he reached an agreement with Almeria over a 6 year contract until 2032 and thus was relegated back to Barcelona Juvenil A.

=== Almería ===
On 2 July 2026, Segunda División side Almería announced the signing of Junyent on a six-year contract. He made his professional debut on 17 August, coming on as a second-half substitute for Nico Melamed in a 3–0 home win over CD Eldense.

== International career ==
Junyent represented Spain internationally at youth levels. As of July 2026, he has 58 caps for Spain ranging from U15s to U19s. He played for the Spanish national under-17 team at the 2023 FIFA U-17 World Cup.

In 2024, Junyent participated in the U17 Euros as captain for Spain U17, the team failed to qualify for semi finals.

In 2025, Junyent made Spain U19 debut in February during a friendly match against Norway U19 by coming on in the second half. He then participated in the U19 Euros later that year and scored a hat-trick in the group stage against Montenegro U19. He was mainly used as a substitute throughout the tournament and helped Spain U19 finish runner-up after a narrow 1-0 defeat against Netherlands U19 in the final.

In 2026's U19 Euros, Junyent became Spain U19's captain, he delivered 1 goal and 3 assists in the tournament, helped Spain U19 win their 10th U19 Euros champion and was named tournament MVP.

== Style of play ==
Junyent mainly operates as a midfielder. He is known for his passing ability and ability to read a game. Junyent can play all positions in midfield, CDM/CM/CAM, though he mainly operates as a number 8. Juynent's game is partly built around his deceptive physical strength and hard-running style.

== Personal life ==
Junyent's father is a chess player.

== Honours ==
Spain U19

- UEFA European Under-19 Championship: 2026; runner-up: 2025

Individual

- UEFA European Under-19 Championship Player of the Tournament: 2026
- UEFA European Under-19 Championship Team of the Tournament: 2026
