= Rafael Pinto Pedrosa =

German footballer (born 2007)

Personal information
- Date of birth: 30 September 2007 (age 19)
- Place of birth: Pforzheim, Germany
- Height: 1.80 m (5 ft 11 in)
- Position: Right-back

Team information
- Current team: Karlsruher SC
- Number: 36

Youth career
- 2015–2017: Kickers Pforzheim
- 2017–2024: Karlsruher SC

Senior career*
Years	Team	Apps	(Gls)
2024–2025	Karlsruher SC II	1	(0)
2024–	Karlsruher SC	42	(1)

International career^{‡}
2024	Germany U17	4	(0)
2024–2025	Germany U18	4	(0)
2025–	Germany U19	13	(0)
Medal record
Men's football
Representing Germany
UEFA European Under-19 Championship
Runner-up	2026 Wales
- * Club domestic league appearances and goals as of 23:28, 16 May 2026 (UTC) ‡ National team caps and goals as of 12:12, 12 July 2026 (UTC)

Rafael Pinto Pedrosa (born 30 September 2007) is a German professional footballer who plays as a right-back for 2. Bundesliga club Karlsruher SC.

== Career ==
Pedrosa is a product of the youth academies of the German clubs Kickers Pforzheim and Karlsruher SC. He started training with Karslruher's senior team in the 2024 winter training camp. He made his professional debut with Karlsruher in a 2–0 win in the 2. Bundesliga over Schalke on 13 September 2024. On 25 April 2025, he signed his first professional contract with Karlsruher.

== International career ==
Born in Germany, Pedrosa is of Portuguese descent and holds dual German and Portuguese citizenship. He is a youth international for Germany, having been called up to the Germany U19s in 2025 and 2026.

== Honours ==
Germany U19

- UEFA European Under-19 Championship runner-up: 2026

Individual

- UEFA European Under-19 Championship Team of the Tournament: 2026
