= 2026 UEFA European Under-19 Championship =

Pencampwriaeth Ewropeaidd Dan-19 UEFA 2026

Tournament details
- Host country: Wales
- Cities: Wrexham; Bangor; Caernarfon; Denbigh
- Dates: 28 June – 11 July
- Teams: 8 (from 1 confederation)
- Venues: 4 (in 4 host cities)

Final positions
- Champions: Spain (13th title)
- Runners-up: Germany

Tournament statistics
- Matches played: 16
- Goals scored: 49 (3.06 per match)
- Attendance: 21,856 (1,366 per match)
- Top scorer(s): (Germany) Otto Stange (Spain) José Morante (4 goals each)
- Best player: (Spain) Quim Junyent

The 2026 UEFA European Under-19 Championship was the 23rd edition of the UEFA European Under-19 Championship and the 73rd edition if the Under-18 and Junior eras are also included. It was the annual international youth football championship organised by UEFA for the men's under-19 national teams of Europe. Wales, which was selected by UEFA on 26 September 2023, hosted the tournament from 28 June to 11 July 2026. A total of eight teams played in the tournament, with players born on or after 1 January 2007 eligible to participate.

As with previous editions held in even-numbered years, the tournament acted as the UEFA qualification tournament for the FIFA U-20 World Cup. The four semi-finalists qualified for the 2027 FIFA U-20 World Cup in Azerbaijan and Uzbekistan, while the two third-placed teams in the group stage met in a play-off for another UEFA berth.

Spain won the tournament and extended their lead in total championships for this age range.

Despite being the lowest attended edition of the under-19 tournament in history, Football Association of Wales CEO Noel Mooney said that "UEFA have been absolutely delighted with how we've managed this tournament and the delivery of this tournament."

Wales, making its debut, became the first country to register no points or goals in the tournament since Bulgaria in the 2014 UEFA European Under-19 Championship. Wales also set a record with the worst goal difference in tournament history (−14).

== Venues ==
Upon being awarded the tournament in 2023, the Football Association of Wales anticipated that the tournament would be staged across five venues in north Wales: Bangor, Colwyn Bay, Deeside, Denbigh and Wrexham. The final list of match venues was later confirmed as four stadiums: the Racecourse Ground in Wrexham, Bangor City Stadium in Bangor, The Oval in Caernarfon and Central Park in Denbigh. Colwyn Bay and Rhyl were listed among the training venues for the tournament.

Wrexham	Bangor
Racecourse Ground	Bangor City Stadium
Capacity: 13,341	Capacity: 3,000
2026 UEFA European Under-19 Championship is located in Wales
Caernarfon	Denbigh
The Oval; Capacity: 3,000	Central Park; Capacity: 2,300

== Qualification ==
=== Qualified teams ===
The following teams qualified for the final tournament.

Note: All appearance statistics include only the U-19 era since 2002.

Team	Qualification method	Date of qualification	Appearance(s)				Previous best performance (Note: Bold text indicates they hosted that edition.)
Team	Qualification method	Date of qualification	Total	First	Last	Streak	Previous best performance
Wales	Host nation	26 September 2023	1st	Debut			Debut
Germany	Elite round Group 1 winners	31 March 2026	11th	2002	2025	2	Champions (2008, 2014)
Serbia	Elite round Group 2 winners	31 March 2026	9th	2005	2022	1	Champions (2013)
Croatia	Elite round Group 3 winners	31 March 2026	4th	2010	2016	1	Semi-finals (2010)
Denmark	Elite round Group 4 winners	31 March 2026	3rd	2024	2025	3	Group stage (2024, 2025)
Ukraine	Elite round Group 5 winners	28 March 2026	7th	2004	2024	1	Champions (2009)
Italy	Elite round Group 6 winners	31 March 2026	11th	2003	2024	1	Champions (2003, 2023)
Spain	Elite round Group 7 winners	31 March 2026	16th	2002	2025	4	Champions (2002, 2004, 2006, 2007, 2011, 2012, 2015, 2019, 2024)

== Officials ==
A total of 6 Referees, 8 Assistants and 2 Fourth Officials were selected for the tournament.

Referees	Assistant Referees	Fourth Officials
Samuel Barrott (England); Florian Badstübner (Germany); Bence Csonka (Hungary); Igor Stojchevski (North Macedonia); Joey Kooij (Netherlands); Joakim Sars (Sweden)	Elşad Abdullayev (Azerbaijan); Wade Smith (England); Christian Gittelmann (Germany); (Hungary) Balázs Szert (Germany); Aleksandar Ǵurkovski (North Macedonia); Murat Küçükerbir (Netherlands); Adam Jeffrey (Northern Ireland); Simon Kristensson (Sweden)	Marius Hansen Grøtta (Norway); Aaron Wyn Jones (Wales)

== Squads ==
Each national team submitted a squad of 20 players, two of whom had to be goalkeepers. Players born on or after 1 January 2007 are eligible to participate. The age listed for each player is their age as of 28 June 2026, the first day of the tournament.

== Group stage ==
The group winners and runners-up advance to the semi-finals. The third-placed teams advance to the FIFA U-20 World Cup play-off.

Tie-breaking criteria for group play
The ranking of teams in the group stage is determined as follows:
1. Points obtained in all group matches;
2. Points in head-to-head matches among tied teams;
3. Goal difference in head-to-head matches among tied teams;
4. Goals scored in head-to-head matches among tied teams;
5. If more than two teams are tied, and after applying all head-to-head criteria above, a subset of teams are still tied, all head-to-head criteria above are reapplied exclusively to this subset of teams;
6. Goal difference in all group matches;
7. Goals scored in all group matches;
8. Penalty shoot-out if only two teams have the same number of points, and they met in the last round of the group and are tied after applying all criteria above (not used if more than two teams have the same number of points, or if their rankings are not relevant for qualification for the next stage);
9. Disciplinary points
  - Yellow card: −1 point;
  - Indirect red card (second yellow card): −3 points;
  - Direct red card: −3 points;
10. UEFA coefficient for the qualifying round draw;
11. Drawing of lots.

=== Group A ===
Pos	Team	Pld	W	D	L	GF	GA	GD	Pts	Qualification
1	Spain	3	3	0	0	14	0	+14	9	Knockout stage
2	Germany	3	2	0	1	8	7	+1	6	Knockout stage
3	Denmark	3	1	0	2	6	7	−1	3	FIFA U-20 World Cup play-off
4	Wales (H)	3	0	0	3	0	14	−14	0	

Source: UEFA
Rules for classification: Group stage tiebreakers
(H) Hosts
28 June 2026
18:00 BST

Wales	0−7	Spain
	Report	Yáñez 16'; Espart 24'; Morante 25', 34'; Junyent 46'; Esteban 77'; Aguado 82'

Racecourse Ground, Wrexham
Attendance: 3,606
Referee: Joakim Östling (Sweden)
28 June 2026
20:00 BST

Germany	4−3	Denmark
Onyeka 5' (pen.); Schjøtt 15' (o.g.); Stange 32', 61' (pen.)	Report	Hyseni 39' (pen.); Martin 51'; Gøthler 72'

Central Park, Denbigh
Attendance: 921
Referee: Sam Barrott (England)

1 July 2026
18:00 BST

Denmark	0−3	Spain
	Report	López 41'; Diallo 81'; Morante 85'

Central Park, Denbigh
Attendance: 1,130
Referee: Igor Stojchevski (North Macedonia)
1 July 2026
20:00 BST

Wales	0−4	Germany
	Report	Onyeka 21'; Culbreath 30'; Stange 58'; Fields 90+3'

Racecourse Ground, Wrexham
Attendance: 1,535
Referee: Bence Csonka (Hungary)

4 July 2026
14:00 BST

Denmark	3−0	Wales
Hyseni 20', 63'; Lærke 49'	Report

Racecourse Ground, Wrexham
Attendance: 1,745
Referee: Joey Kooij (Netherlands)
4 July 2026
14:00 BST

Spain	4−0	Germany
Esteban 20', 31'; Diallo 54'; Morante 75'	Report

Central Park, Denbigh
Attendance: 1,725
Referee: Joakim Östling (Sweden)

=== Group B ===
Pos	Team	Pld	W	D	L	GF	GA	GD	Pts	Qualification
1	Ukraine	3	3	0	0	6	2	+4	9	Knockout stage
2	Croatia	3	1	1	1	4	3	+1	4	Knockout stage
3	Italy	3	1	1	1	2	1	+1	4	FIFA U-20 World Cup play-off
4	Serbia	3	0	0	3	1	7	−6	0	

Updated to match(es) played on 2 July 2026. Source: UEFA
Rules for classification: Group stage tiebreakers
29 June 2026
16:00 BST

Italy	2–0	Serbia
Liberali 11' (pen.); Iddrissou 76'	Report

The Oval, Caernarfon
Attendance: 1,212
Referee: Florian Badstübner (Germany)
29 June 2026
20:00 BST

Croatia	1−3	Ukraine
Barić 22' (pen.)	Report	Bohdanov 26'; Kalyuzhnyi 48'; Lyusin 57'

Bangor City Stadium, Bangor
Attendance: 826
Referee: Igor Stojchevski (North Macedonia)

2 July 2026
14:00 BST

Croatia	0–0	Italy
	Report

The Oval, Caernarfon
Attendance: 1,203
Referee: Joey Kooij (Netherlands)
2 July 2026
18:00 BST

Serbia	1–2	Ukraine
Ranković 16'	Report	Glyut 32', 36'

Bangor City Stadium, Bangor
Attendance: 859
Referee: Sam Barrott (England)

5 July 2026
16:00 BST

Ukraine	1–0	Italy
Olychenko 30'	Report

Bangor City Stadium, Bangor
Attendance: 1,074
Referee: Bence Csonka (Hungary)
5 July 2026
16:00 BST

Serbia	0–3	Croatia
	Report	Chelfi 9'; Godec 70'; Čović 87' (pen.)

The Oval, Caernarfon
Attendance: 1,141
Referee: Florian Badstübner (Germany)

== Knockout stage ==
In the knockout stage, extra time and penalty shoot-out will be used to decide the winners if necessary.

=== Bracket ===
Semi-finals
8 July – Central Park, Denbigh
Spain	3
Croatia	0
8 July – Racecourse Ground, Wrexham
Ukraine	1
Germany	2

Final
11 July – Racecourse Ground, Wrexham
Spain	2
Germany	0

=== FIFA U-20 World Cup play-off ===
Winners advance to the inter-confederation play-offs, to qualify for the 2027 FIFA U-20 World Cup.

8 July 2026
14:00 BST

Denmark	0−0 (a.e.t.)	Italy
	Report
Penalties
Søndergaard (penalty scored); Gøthler (penalty missed); Lærke (penalty scored); Kirk (penalty scored); Abrahamsen (penalty scored); Stüker (penalty scored)	5−4	(penalty scored) Coletta; (penalty scored) Marello; (penalty missed) Natali; (penalty scored) Wiafe; (penalty scored) Iddrissou; (penalty missed) Elimoghale

Bangor City Stadium, Bangor
Attendance: 568
Referee: Florian Badstübner (Germany)

=== Semi-finals ===
8 July 2026
16:30 BST

Spain	3−0	Croatia
Espart 12'; Salinas 54'; Diallo 83'	Report

Central Park, Denbigh
Attendance: 1,121
Referee: Bence Csonka (Hungary)

8 July 2026
19:00 BST

Ukraine	1−2	Germany
Glyut 43'	Report	Stange 45+1'; Onyeka 90+1'

Racecourse Ground, Wrexham
Attendance: 857
Referee: Joey Kooij (Netherlands)

=== Final ===
11 July 2026
19:00 BST

Spain	2–0	Germany
López 44'; Rivas 48'	Report

Racecourse Ground, Wrexham
Attendance: 2,333
Referee: Samuel Barrott (England)

Spain won their record-extending tenth Under-19 European Championship title, defeating Germany 2–0 in the final at the Racecourse Ground in Wrexham.

== Qualified teams for FIFA U-20 World Cup ==
The following teams from UEFA qualified for the 2027 FIFA U-20 World Cup, including Azerbaijan, which qualified as co-host. Denmark was advanced to the inter-confederation play-offs.

Team	Qualified on	Previous appearances in FIFA U-20 World Cup^{1}
Azerbaijan **(H)**	2 October 2025	0 (debut)
Spain	1 July 2026	17th (1977, 1979, 1981, 1985, 1989, 1991, 1995, 1997, **1999**, 2003, 2005, 2007, 2009, 2011, 2013 and 2025)
Germany	1 July 2026	12th (**1981**, 1987, 1993, 1995, 1999, 2001, 2003, 2005, 2009, 2015 and 2017)
Ukraine	2 July 2026	6th (2001, 2005, 2015, **2019** and 2025)
Croatia	5 July 2026	4th (1999, 2011 and 2013)

^{1} Bold indicates champions for that year

== Inter-confederation play-offs ==
A four-team play-off tournament will decide the final slot in the competition. The play-off slot allocation is as follows:

- AFC (Asia): 1 slot: TBD (March 2027)
- CONMEBOL (South America): 1 slot: TBD (February 2027)
- OFC (Oceania): 1 slot: Tahiti (12 September 2026)
- UEFA (Europe): 1 slot: Denmark

The competition will be held at a neutral venue and will consist of two single leg semi-finals and a final, with the winner of the final qualifying.

== Goalscorers ==
There were 49 goals scored in 16 matches, for an average of 3.06 goals per match.

4 goals

- (Germany) Otto Stange
- (Spain) José Morante

3 goals

- (Denmark) Olti Hyseni
- (Germany) Francis Onyeka
- (Spain) Ousmane Diallo
- (Spain) Sergio Esteban
- (Ukraine) Vitaliy Glyut

2 goals

- (Spain) Xavi Espart
- (Spain) Hugo López

1 goal

- (Croatia) Ivan Barić
- (Croatia) Lovro Chelfi
- (Croatia) Patrice Čović
- (Croatia) Dino Godec
- (Denmark) Alfred Gøthler
- (Denmark) Hjalte Lærke
- (Denmark) William Martin
- (Germany) Montrell Culbreath
- (Germany) Jykese Fields
- (Italy) Jamal Iddrissou
- (Italy) Mattia Liberali
- (Serbia) Đorđe Ranković
- (Spain) Diego Aguado
- (Spain) Quim Junyent
- (Spain) Mario Rivas
- (Spain) Jorge Salinas
- (Spain) Daniel Yáñez
- (Ukraine) Dmytro Bohdanov
- (Ukraine) Nikita Kalyuzhnyi
- (Ukraine) Pavlo Lyusin
- (Ukraine) Bohdan Olychenko

1 own goal

- (Denmark) Gustav Schjøtt (against Germany)

Source: UEFA

== Team of the Tournament ==
The UEFA Technical Observer group announced the team of the tournament after the end of the competition.

Goalkeeper	Defenders	Midfielders	Forwards
(Spain) Manuel González	(Ukraine) Danylo Malov; (Italy) Andrea Natali; (Spain) Mario Rivas; (Germany) Rafael Pinto Pedrosa	(Ukraine) Pavlo Liusin; (Spain) Quim Junyent; (Spain) Xavi Espart; (Spain) Thiago Pitarch	(Germany) Otto Stange; (Spain) José Antonio Morante
