= Mario Rivas (footballer, born 2007) =

Spanish footballer (born 2007)

Personal information
- Full name: Mario Rivas Lagos
- Date of birth: 6 March 2007 (age 19)
- Place of birth: Seville, Spain
- Height: 1.91 m (6 ft 3 in)
- Position: Centre-back

Team information
- Current team: Real Madrid B
- Number: 4

Youth career
- 2013–2016: UD Bétera
- 2016–2021: Getafe
- 2021–2024: Real Madrid

Senior career*
Years	Team	Apps	(Gls)
2024	Real Madrid C	7	(0)
2024–	Real Madrid B	45	(1)

International career^{‡}
2023	Spain U17	2	(0)
2025–2026	Spain U19	13	(2)
Medal record
Men's football
Representing Spain
UEFA European Under-19 Championship
Winner	2026 Wales
- * Club domestic league appearances and goals as of 31 May 2026 ‡ National team caps and goals as of 20:23, 11 July 2026 (UTC)

Mario Rivas Lagos (born 6 March 2007) is a Spanish footballer who plays as a centre-back for Real Madrid Castilla.

== Early life ==
Rivas was born on 6 March 2007 in Seville, Spain. A native of Seville, Spain, he is the son of Spanish footballer Nano Rivas.

== Club career ==
As a youth player, Rivas joined the youth academy of UD Bétera. In 2016, he joined the youth academy of Getafe. Subsequently, he joined the youth academy of La Liga side Real Madrid, where he played in the UEFA Youth League, and was promoted to the club's C team in 2024. The same year, he was promoted to their reserve team.

== Style of play ==
Rivas plays as a highly intelligent, composed, and proactive center-back defender. Spanish newspaper Okdiario wrote in 2025 that he is "fast, versatile, has good footwork and has a remarkable ability to anticipate".

Madrid Universal wrote in February 2025: "His ability to read the game and anticipate plays without relying solely on physicality is what sets him apart. While he still has room to grow physically, Rivas’ positioning and intuitive understanding of the game have earned him a reputation at Valdebebas [Real Madrid's training ground]."

== Honours ==
Spain U19

- UEFA European Under-19 Championship: 2026

Individual

- UEFA European Under-19 Championship Team of the Tournament: 2026
