= Otto Stange =

German footballer (born 2007)

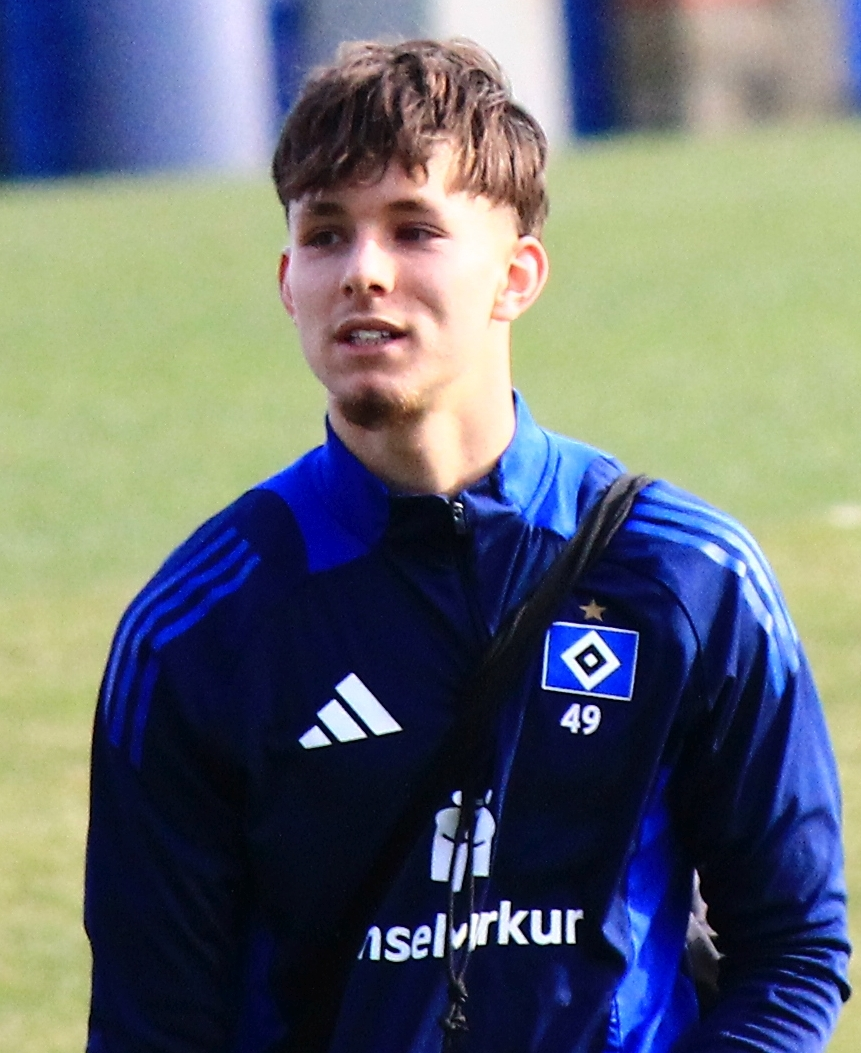
- Stange in 2025

Personal information
- Full name: Otto Emerson Stange
- Date of birth: 9 February 2007 (age 19)
- Place of birth: Hamburg, Germany
- Height: 1.87 m (6 ft 2 in)
- Position: Striker

Team information
- Current team: Hamburger SV
- Number: 49

Youth career
- 2013–2017: SC Victoria Hamburg
- 2017–2022: Eimsbütteler TV
- 2022–2024: Hamburger SV

Senior career*
Years	Team	Apps	(Gls)
2024–	Hamburger SV II	10	(2)
2024–	Hamburger SV	30	(2)
2025–2026	→ SV Elversberg (loan)	11	(3)

International career^{‡}
2022–2023	Germany U16	11	(4)
2023–2024	Germany U17	12	(2)
2025	Germany U18	2	(0)
2025–2026	Germany U19	12	(12)
2026–	Germany U20	3	(0)
Medal record
Men's football
Representing Germany
UEFA European Under-19 Championship
Runner-up	2026 Wales
- * Club domestic league appearances and goals as of 1 November 2026 ‡ National team caps and goals as of 21:15, 3 October 2026 (UTC)

Otto Emerson Stange (German pronunciation: [ˈɔto ˈʃtaŋə]; born 9 February 2007) is a German professional footballer who plays as a striker for Bundesliga club Hamburger SV.

== Early life ==
Stange is of Brazilian descent through his maternal grandmother. His middle name, Emerson, comes from the Brazilian Formula One racer Emerson Fittipaldi, who his grandmother had a crush on and gave the middle name to her son, Otto's uncle; the middle name was then inherited by Stange. Before playing football at the age of 5 he was a skateboarder and participated in the Mystic Sk8 Cup, before deciding to pursue football due to a lack of peers in skateboarding locally. His father was a fan of Hamburger SV and took Stange to games since he was an infant. He was a ballboy for Hamburger SV, and in April 2023 in a match against FC St. Pauli delayed handing over the ball to St. Pauli before a throw-in causing an altercation with their players Jakov Medić and Manolis Saliakas.

== Club career ==
=== Hamburger SV ===
Stange began playing youth football with SC Victoria Hamburg at the age of 6, before moving to Eimsbütteler TV in 2017. In the summer of 2022, he moved to the academy of Hamburger SV where he finished his development. In the 2023–24 season he was promoted to Hamburg's U17s, and after scoring 7 goals in his first 7 games started training with their senior team on 23 October 2023. On 3 November 2023, he made the bench for a DFB Pokal match against Arminia Bielefeld. On 3 January 2024, he was training with the senior team for winter preparations. On 23 January 2024, he signed a long-term contract with Hamburg. He was promoted to Hamburg's U19 for the remainder of the season where he won the Hamburger Landespokal.

In the summer of 2024, he joined the senior team for the preseason training camp. He was promoted to Hamburger SV II in the Regionalliga. On 8 November 2024, he debuted with the senior Hamburger SV team as a substitute in a 3–1 loss in the 2. Bundesliga to Eintracht Braunschweig. He scored his first senior goal in a 5–0 league win over SpVgg Greuther Fürth on 21 December 2024.

==== Loan to SV Elversberg ====
On 1 September 2025, Stange joined 2. Bundesliga club SV Elversberg, on a one-year loan. The loan deal ended on transfer-deadline day on 2 February 2026.

== International career ==
Stange is a youth international for Germany, having played for the Germany U16s, Germany U17s and Germany U19s.

== Career statistics ==
As of match played 1 November 2026

Appearances and goals by club, season and competition
Club	Season	League			DFB-Pokal		Europe		Other		Total	
Club	Season	Division	Apps	Goals	Apps	Goals	Apps	Goals	Apps	Goals	Apps	Goals
Hamburger SV II	2024–25	Regionalliga Nord	9	2	—		—		—		9	2
Hamburger SV II	2025–26	Regionalliga Nord	1	0	—		—		—		1	0
Hamburger SV II	Total		10	2	—		—		—		10	2
Hamburger SV	2024–25	2. Bundesliga	14	2	0	0	—		—		14	2
Hamburger SV	2025–26	Bundesliga	10	0	1	0	—		—		11	0
Hamburger SV	2026–27	Bundesliga	7	0	2	0	—		—		9	0
Hamburger SV	Total		31	2	3	0	—		—		34	2
SV Elversberg (loan)	2025–26	2. Bundesliga	11	3	1	0	—		—		12	3
Career total			52	7	4	0	0	0	0	0	56	7

== Honours ==
Germany U19

- UEFA European Under-19 Championship runner-up: 2026

Individual

- UEFA European Under-19 Championship top scorer: 2026
- UEFA European Under-19 Championship Team of the Tournament: 2026
