= Diego Aguado =

Spanish footballer (born 2007)

Personal information
- Full name: Diego Aguado Facio
- Date of birth: 7 February 2007 (age 19)
- Place of birth: Madrid, Spain
- Height: 1.82 m (6 ft 0 in)
- Position: Centre-back

Team information
- Current team: Real Madrid B
- Number: 3

Youth career
- 2014–2017: Soto del Real
- 2017–2024: Real Madrid

Senior career*
Years	Team	Apps	(Gls)
2024–	Real Madrid B	30	(0)
2025	Real Madrid C	2	(0)
2025–	Real Madrid	1	(0)

International career^{‡}
2024–2025	Spain U17	8	(0)
2024–	Spain U18	3	(1)
2024–	Spain U19	7	(0)
2025	Spain U20	3	(0)
Medal record
Men's football
Representing Spain
UEFA European Under-19 Championship
Winner	2026 Wales
- * Club domestic league appearances and goals as of 06:37, 8 September 2026 (UTC) ‡ National team caps and goals as of 11 October 2025

Diego Aguado Facio (born 7 February 2007) is a Spanish footballer who plays as a defender for Real Madrid Castilla.

== Early life ==
Aguado was born on 7 February 2007 in Madrid, Spain. Growing up, he aspired to become a firefighter as an adult.

== Career ==
As a youth player, Aguado joined the youth academy of La Liga side Real Madrid. In 2024, he was promoted to the club's first team and their reserve team. On 6 January 2025, he made his professional debut with the senior Real Madrid team in a 5–0 Copa del Rey win over Minera.

== Style of play ==
Aguado plays as a defender, specifically as a centre-back or as a left-back. Known for his speed and passing ability, he is left-footed.

== Honours ==
Spain U19

- UEFA European Under-19 Championship: 2026
