= Paco Esteban (footballer, born 2006) =

Spanish footballer (born 2006)

Personal information
- Full name: Francisco Esteban Sánchez
- Date of birth: 2 May 2006 (age 20)
- Place of birth: Málaga, Spain
- Height: 1.85 m (6 ft 1 in)
- Position: Striker

Team information
- Current team: Lecce
- Number: 22

Youth career
- –2020: Villarreal
- 2020–2024: Atlético Madrid
- 2024–2025: Betis
- 2025–2026: Lecce

Senior career*
Years	Team	Apps	(Gls)
2025	Betis B	1	(0)
2026–	Lecce	1	(0)

International career^{‡}
2021–2022	Spain U16	9	(4)
2023	Spain U17	2	(0)
2024	Spain U18	1	(0)
- * Club domestic league appearances and goals as of 23 August 2026 ‡ National team caps and goals as of 19:07, 20 March 2024 (UTC)

Francisco Esteban Sánchez (born 2 May 2006) is a Spanish footballer who plays as a striker for Serie A club Lecce.

== Early life ==
Esteban moved with his family to Elche, Spain, at the age of three. He has regarded Spain international Fernando Torres as his football idol.

== Club career ==
As a youth player, Esteban joined the youth academy of Villarreal. He was regarded as one of the club's most important players. In 2020, he joined the youth academy of La Liga side Atlético Madrid.

On 1 September 2026, Esteban moved to Lecce in Italy, where he was assigned to their Under-19 squad. He was promoted to the club's senior team in the summer of 2026.

== International career ==
Esteban represented Spain internationally at youth level.

== Style of play ==
Esteban mainly operates as a striker. He is right-footed and known for his speed.

== Personal life ==
Esteban has a younger brother named Sergio, also a footballer. Both are the sons of Spanish footballer Paco Esteban.
