= Central Park (Denbigh) =

Football stadium in Wales

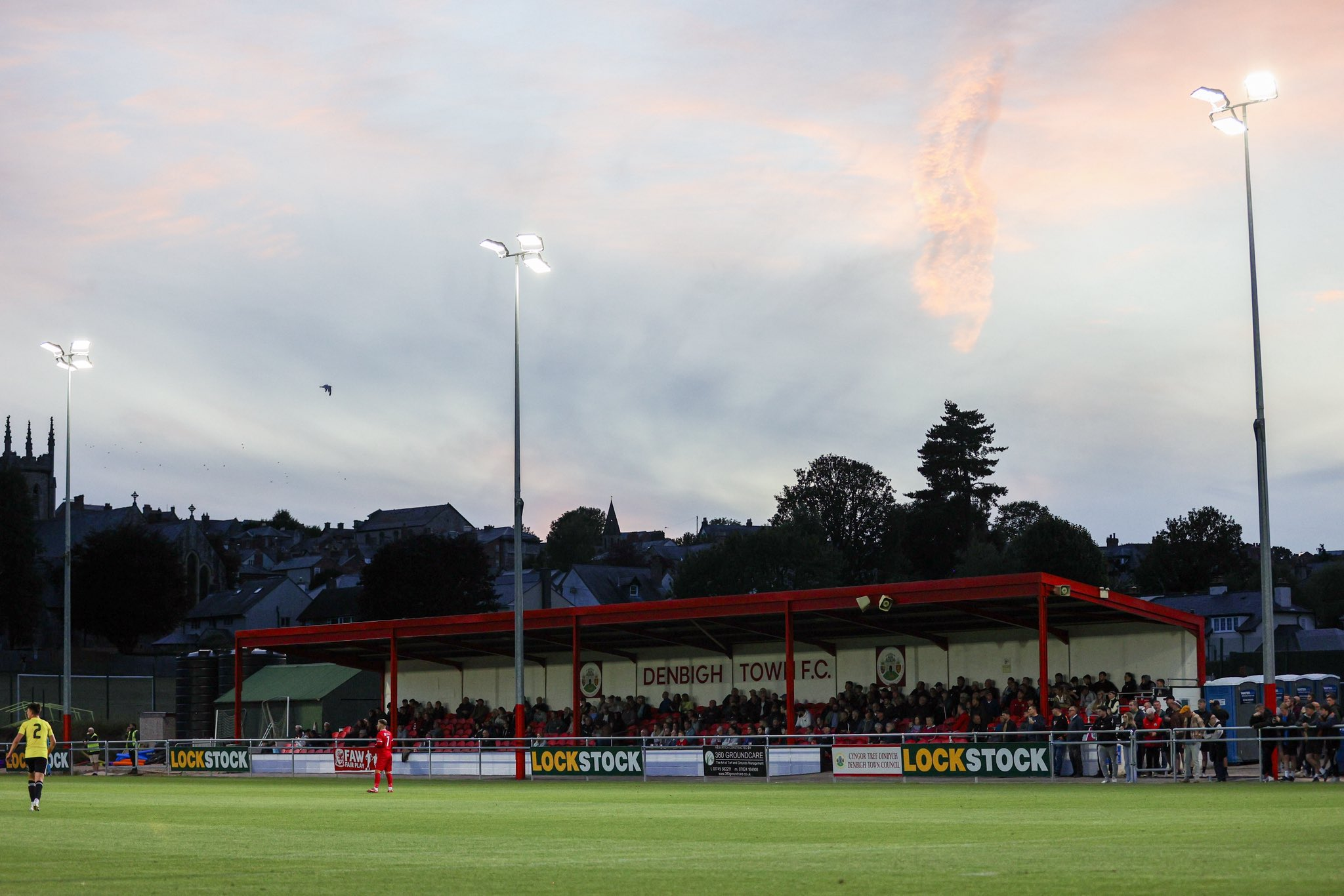
- Central Park, Denbigh
- Interactive map of Central Park
- Location: Denbigh, Denbighshire, Wales
- Operator: Denbigh Town Football Club CIC
- Capacity: 2,300 (600 seated)
- Surface: Grass

Construction
- Opened: 1963

Tenants
- Denbigh Town Football Club (1963–present)

Central Park is an association football stadium in Denbigh, Wales. It was opened in 1963 and has been the home ground of Denbigh Town ever since.

== History ==
Following the establishment of Denbigh Town Football Club in 1876 and the first 89 years of the club's existence spent at various pitches around the town, the club built their own purpose-built football ground in 1963.

Officially opened in December 1963, Central Park became the permanent home for the football club from then on. The ground consisted of a new 'pavilion' changing rooms and pitch-side barriers.

In September 2012 the club erected floodlights for the first time.

The ground's stand was demolished and replaced by a brand new 470 seater main stand, which officially opened in August 2017.

In August 2021 the pitch was relaid to help deal with flooding and drainage issues. The ground had undergone a series of improvements, aiming to allow Denbigh Town to join the Cymru Premier, the top tier of Welsh football. The newly relaid pitch was first used on 3 September, in a Welsh Cup second round match against Caernarfon Town, which was to be shown on S4C.

In October 2023 the club announced that Central Park had been selected as one of five host grounds for the 2026 UEFA European Under-19 Championship. As part of this, the club began development on a seven-figure facility which included demolishing the original changing rooms and replacing it with a two-story community facility, with work completed in the autumn of 2025.

New changing rooms were built in 2024, as the previous ones that stood for over 60 years since the ground was built in 1963.

Significant work in 2025 included two new stands on the far side of the ground, terracing behind the Myddleton College end, ducting laid across the pitch for electricity to power a new gantry, VAR system and new 16-seater dugouts. New barriers were also installed improving the capacity of the ground to 2,300. For the first three games of the 2025–26 season Denbigh Town had to play at alternative grounds as the work was not yet complete. On 5 September 2025 the club returned to Central Park.

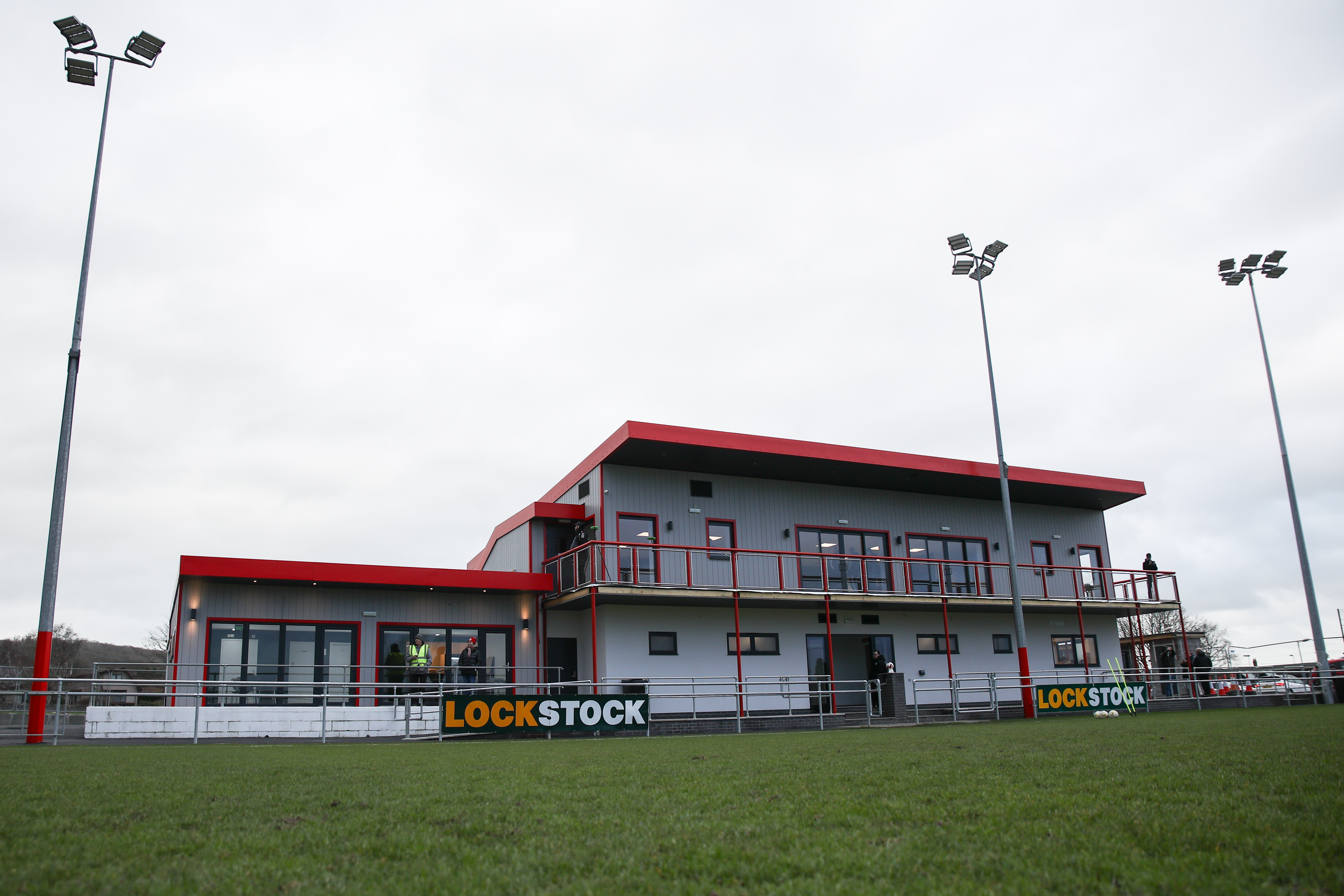

=== Notable matches ===
In 2022 it was announced that it would host matches as part of the UEFA U16 Development Tournament in August.

In April 2023 it hosted two games of the Wales women under-19 team.

In November 2023 Central Park was one of five grounds chosen to host the Victory Shield between Wales, Scotland, Republic of Ireland and Northern Ireland.

In 2024 it hosted the northern final of the Welsh Tier Two League Cup, the final of the Cookson Cup, and the first leg of the UEFA Regions Cup tie between the Cymru North and the Cymru South.

It is one of five grounds that will host matches at the 2026 UEFA European Under-19 Championship. As a result, the ground has received significant investment from the FAW.

The record attendance for the ground was broken on Boxing Day 2023 where 1,145 saw Denbigh Town beat Ruthin Town in the Vale of Clwyd Derby.

In June and July 2026 Central Park hosted four games in the UEFA U19 Euro , including Spain, Germany, Denmark and Croatia. The record attendance for the ground was broken on July 4 2026, with 1,725 attending the game between Spain and Germany in Group A.
