= 1998 UEFA European Under-18 Championship squads =

Player listings in youth football competition

The following is the list of football players selected for the 1998 European under-18 championship played in Cyprus.

Each national team submitted a squad of 18 players, two of whom had to be goalkeepers.

Ages are correct as of the start of the tournament, 19 July 1998. Players in bold have later been capped at full international level.

== Group A ==
=== Germany ===
Head coach: Rainer Bonhof

No.	Pos.	Player	Date of birth (age)	Caps	Goals	Club
1	GK	**Timo Hildebrand**	5 April 1979 (aged 19)			(German Football Association) VfB Stuttgart
2	DF	Martin Forkel	22 July 1979 (aged 18)			(German Football Association) Greuther Fürth
3	DF	Manuel Benthin	3 March 1979 (aged 19)			(German Football Association) Hamburger SV
4	DF	Marcel Rapp	16 April 1979 (aged 19)			(German Football Association) Karlsruher SC
5	MF	**Fabian Ernst** (Captain)	30 May 1979 (aged 19)			(German Football Association) Hannover 96
6	MF	Andreas Voss	27 February 1979 (aged 19)			(German Football Association) Bayer 04 Leverkusen
7	FW	Christian Timm	27 February 1979 (aged 19)			(German Football Association) Borussia Dortmund
8	DF	Thorsten Schramm	19 February 1979 (aged 19)			(German Football Association) MSV Duisburg
9	MF	Andreas Gensler	13 August 1979 (aged 18)			(German Football Association) Bayer 04 Leverkusen
10	MF	**Sebastian Deisler**	5 January 1980 (aged 18)			(German Football Association) Borussia Mönchengladbach
11	MF	Wolf-Manuel Majunke	10 February 1979 (aged 19)			(German Football Association) VfB Stuttgart
12	GK	Stefan Wessels	28 February 1979 (aged 19)			(German Football Association) Bayern Munich
13	DF	Thomas Lechner	9 January 1979 (aged 19)			(German Football Association) 1. FC Kaiserslautern
14	MF	**Sebastian Kehl**	13 February 1980 (aged 18)			(German Football Association) Hannover 96
15	MF	Silvio Pätz	11 July 1979 (aged 19)			(German Football Association) Rot-Weiß Erfurt
16	FW	Enrico Kern	12 March 1979 (aged 19)			(German Football Association) Erzgebirge Aue
17	DF	Gregor Kapitza	9 August 1979 (aged 18)			(German Football Association) 1. FC Köln
18	MF	Tobias Schäper	24 October 1979 (aged 18)			(German Football Association) Borussia Dortmund

=== Lithuania ===
Head coach: Vytautas Stanevičius

=== Portugal ===
Head coach: Agostinho Oliveira

=== Spain ===
Head coach: Iñaki Sáez

== Group B ==
=== Croatia ===
Head coach: Martin Novoselac

No.	Pos.	Player	Date of birth (age)	Caps	Goals	Club
1	GK	**Stipe Pletikosa** (Captain)	8 January 1979 (aged 19)			(Croatian Football Federation) Hajduk Split
2	DF	**Goran Sablić**	4 August 1979 (aged 18)			(Croatian Football Federation) Hajduk Split
3	MF	Dalibor Tukser	25 August 1980 (aged 17)			(Croatian Football Federation) Varteks
4	DF	Jurica Puljiz	13 December 1979 (aged 18)			(Croatian Football Federation) Hajduk Split
5	MF	**Jurica Vranješ**	31 January 1980 (aged 18)			(Croatian Football Federation) Osijek
6	MF	**Srđan Andrić**	5 January 1980 (aged 18)			(Croatian Football Federation) Hajduk Split
7	MF	Mihael Mikić	6 January 1980 (aged 18)			(Croatian Football Federation) Croatia Zagreb
8	MF	**Josip Balatinac**	7 March 1979 (aged 19)			(Croatian Football Federation) Osijek
9	FW	**Saša Bjelanović**	11 June 1979 (aged 19)			(Croatian Football Federation) Zadar
10	FW	Zvonimir Deranja	22 September 1979 (aged 18)			(Croatian Football Federation) Hajduk Split
11	FW	**Igor Budan**	22 April 1980 (aged 18)			(Croatian Football Federation) Rijeka
12	GK	Hrvoje Sunara	4 August 1979 (aged 18)			(Croatian Football Federation) Hajduk Split
13	DF	Edo Vulić	7 December 1979 (aged 18)			(Croatian Football Federation) Hajduk Split
14	MF	Branko Banović	18 August 1979 (aged 18)			(Croatian Football Federation) Croatia Zagreb
15	MF	**Ivan Režić**	15 September 1979 (aged 18)			(Croatian Football Federation) Varteks
16	MF	**Ivica Banović**	2 August 1980 (aged 17)			(Croatian Football Federation) NK Zagreb
17	FW	**Ivica Olić**	14 September 1979 (aged 18)			(Croatian Football Federation) Marsonia
18	FW	Krunoslav Lovrek	11 September 1979 (aged 18)			(Croatian Football Federation) NK Zagreb

=== Cyprus ===
Head coach: Chrysostomos Iakovou

=== England ===
Head coach: Howard Wilkinson

No.	Pos.	Player	Date of birth (age)	Caps	Goals	Club
1	GK	Steve Simonsen	3 April 1979 (aged 19)			(The Football Association) Tranmere Rovers
2	MF	Curtis Woodhouse	17 April 1980 (aged 18)			(The Football Association) Sheffield United
3	DF	**Michael Ball**	2 October 1979 (aged 18)			(The Football Association) Everton
4	MF	Richard Cooper	27 September 1979 (aged 18)			(The Football Association) Nottingham Forest
5	DF	**Jonathan Woodgate**	22 January 1980 (aged 18)			(The Football Association) Leeds United
6	DF	**Matthew Upson** (Captain)	18 April 1979 (aged 19)			(The Football Association) Arsenal
7	DF	Andy Griffin	17 March 1979 (aged 19)			(The Football Association) Stoke City
8	MF	Paolo Vernazza	1 November 1979 (aged 18)			(The Football Association) Arsenal
9	FW	Lee Mathews	16 January 1979 (aged 19)			(The Football Association) Leeds United
10	FW	Danny Cadamarteri	12 October 1979 (aged 18)			(The Football Association) Everton
11	MF	**Seth Johnson**	12 March 1979 (aged 19)			(The Football Association) Derby County
12	MF	Anthony Ormerod	31 March 1979 (aged 19)			(The Football Association) Middlesbrough
13	GK	**Paul Robinson**	15 October 1979 (aged 18)			(The Football Association) Leeds United
14	DF	**Luke Young**	19 July 1979 (aged 19)			(The Football Association) Tottenham Hotspur
15	DF	Nick Fenton	23 November 1979 (aged 18)			(The Football Association) Manchester City
16	MF	John Piercy	18 September 1979 (aged 18)			(The Football Association) Tottenham Hotspur
17	MF	**David Dunn**	27 December 1979 (aged 18)			(The Football Association) Blackburn Rovers
18	FW	**Alan Smith**	28 October 1980 (aged 17)			(The Football Association) Leeds United

=== Republic of Ireland ===
Head coach: Brian Kerr

No.	Pos.	Player	Date of birth (age)	Caps	Goals	Club
1	GK	Alex O'Reilly	5 September 1979 (aged 18)			(The Football Association) West Ham United
2	DF	Thomas Heary	14 February 1979 (aged 19)			(The Football Association) Huddersfield Town
3	DF	Keith Doyle	20 July 1979 (aged 18)			(Football Association of Ireland) St Patrick's Athletic
4	DF	**Richard Dunne**	21 September 1979 (aged 18)			(The Football Association) Everton
5	FW	**Gary Doherty**	31 January 1980 (aged 18)			(The Football Association) Luton Town
6	DF	Jason Gavin	14 March 1980 (aged 18)			(The Football Association) Middlesbrough
7	MF	**Stephen McPhail**	9 December 1979 (aged 18)			(The Football Association) Leeds United
8	FW	Gerard Crossley	5 February 1980 (aged 18)			(Scottish Football Association) Celtic
9	DF	**Barry Quinn** (Captain)	9 May 1979 (aged 19)			(The Football Association) Coventry City
10	FW	**Robbie Keane**	8 July 1980 (aged 18)			(The Football Association) Wolverhampton Wanderers
11	MF	Ronnie O'Brien	5 January 1979 (aged 19)			(The Football Association) Middlesbrough
12	MF	**Alan Quinn**	13 June 1979 (aged 19)			(The Football Association) Sheffield Wednesday
13	MF	Paul Donnelly	31 August 1979 (aged 18)			(The Football Association) Leeds United
14	DF	Ryan Casey	3 January 1979 (aged 19)			(The Football Association) Swansea City
15	FW	Liam George	2 February 1979 (aged 19)			(The Football Association) Luton Town
16	GK	Dean Delany	15 September 1980 (aged 17)			(The Football Association) Everton
17	MF	Richie Partridge	12 September 1980 (aged 17)			(The Football Association) Liverpool
18	FW	David Freeman	25 November 1979 (aged 18)			(The Football Association) Nottingham Forest
