= The Oval, Caernarfon =

Multi-use stadium in Wales

The Oval
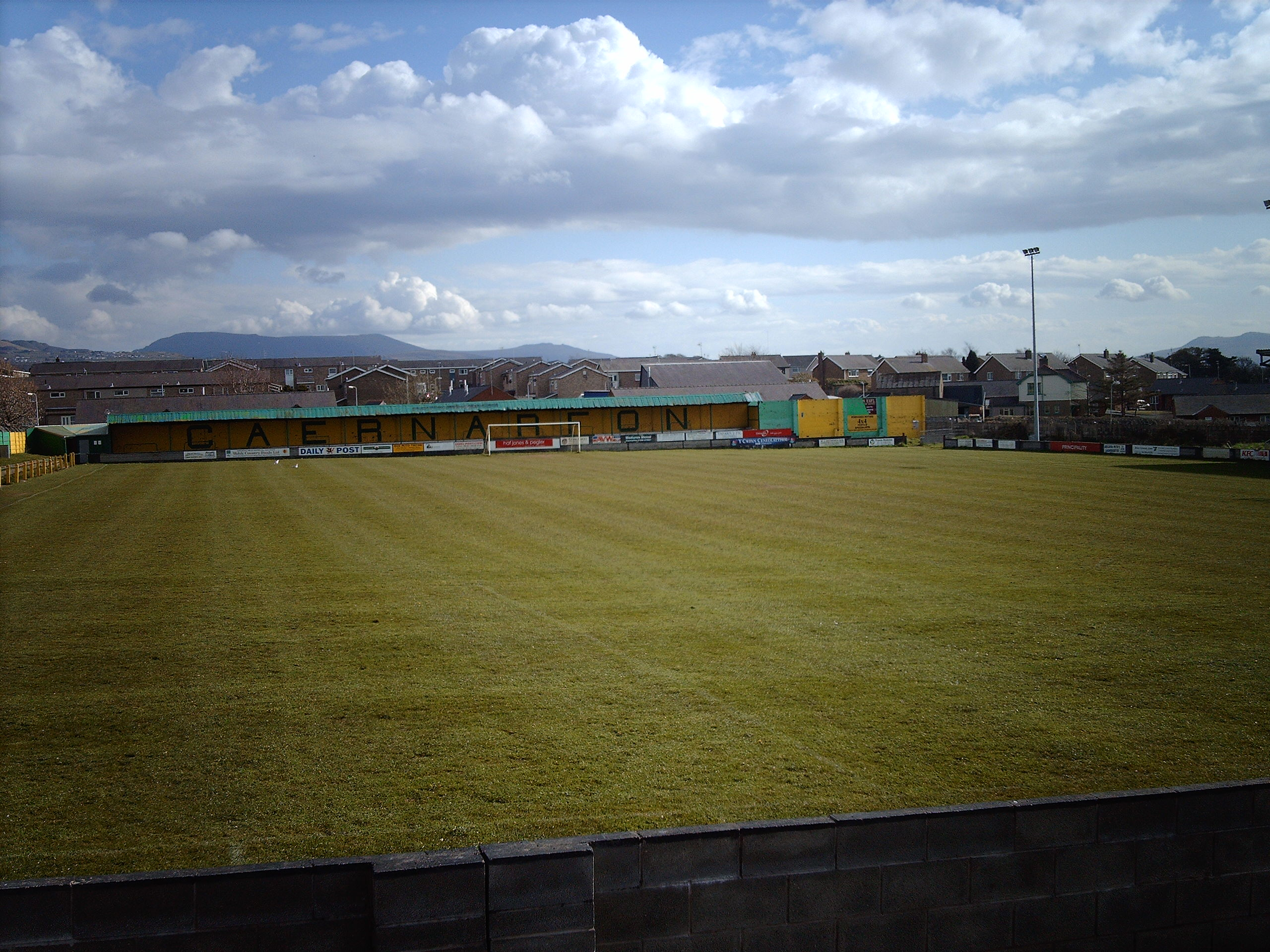
- Interactive map of The Oval
- Full name: The Oval
- Location: Caernarfon, Gwynedd, Wales
- Coordinates: 53°8′5″N 4°16′3″W
- Capacity: 3,000
- Surface: Grass

Tenants
- Caernarvon Wanderers (1888–1891); Carnarvon Ironopolis (1894–1903); Caernarvon Colts (1903–1906); Caernarfon RWF (1903–1906); Carnarvon United 1906-1914; Caernarvon Athletic (1919–1932); Caernarfon Town F.C. (1937-)

The Oval is a multi-use stadium in Caernarfon, Wales. It is currently used mostly for football matches and is the home ground of Caernarfon Town F.C. The stadium holds 3,000 people, with 1,200 seats.

The previous seating for the Hendre End of the ground was purchased from Shrewsbury Town when they became surplus to requirements due to the demolition of Gay Meadow. They have since been removed and replaced with yellow and green seats funded by the Football Trust.

Following significant redevelopment during the 2025/26 season, the Oval staged three games in the 2026 UEFA European Under-19 Championship. Due to the construction of the Wyn Davies Stand, the seated capacity increased to 1,200 following the renovation.
