= Thiago Pitarch =

Spanish footballer (born 2007)

Personal information
- Full name: Thiago Pitarch Pinar
- Date of birth: 3 August 2007 (age 19)
- Place of birth: Fuenlabrada, Spain
- Height: 1.75 m (5 ft 9 in)
- Position: Midfielder

Team information
- Current team: Real Madrid
- Number: 27

Youth career
- 2013–2018: Atlético Madrid
- 2018–2022: Getafe
- 2022–2023: Leganés
- 2023–2026: Real Madrid

Senior career*
Years	Team	Apps	(Gls)
2025–2026	Real Madrid C	2	(0)
2025–	Real Madrid B	19	(0)
2026–	Real Madrid	11	(0)

International career^{‡}
2026	Spain U19	9	(0)
2025–	Spain U20	7	(1)
Medal record
Men's football
Representing Spain
UEFA European Under-19 Championship
Winner	2026 Wales
- * Club domestic league appearances and goals as of 22:03, 7 November 2026 (UTC) ‡ National team caps and goals as of 08:35, 1 October 2026 (UTC)

Thiago Pitarch Pinar (born 3 August 2007) is a Spanish professional footballer who plays as a midfielder for La Liga club Real Madrid.

== Early life ==
Thiago Pitarch Pinar was born in Fuenlabrada, Spain and he acquired a double nationality of Spanish and Moroccan as his grandfather is originally from Al Hoceima.

== Club career ==
=== Youth career ===
Pitarch started his youth career at Atlético Madrid academy, where he spent five years. In 2018, he moved to the Getafe academy where he stayed until 2022. He then moved to Leganés for one season before joining Real Madrid in 2023.

At Real Madrid, Pitarch started playing in the Juvenil C team before making the jump to Juvenil B ahead of the 2024–25 season. In January 2025, coach Álvaro Arbeloa promoted him to Juvenil A, where Pitarch became a starter. Later in July 2025, he was promoted to their reserve team. In August 2025, he extended his contract with the club until 2030.

=== First team breakthrough ===
On 17 February 2026, Pitarch made his senior debut as a substitute in the stoppage time of 1–0 away win over Benfica in the Champions League.

== International career ==
Born in Spain, Pitarch is of Moroccan descent through his grandfather and is eligible to play for both Spain and Morocco. He played for Spain at the 2025 FIFA U-20 World Cup.

== Style of play ==
Pitarch plays as a midfielder. He is capable of connecting lines, stepping into the area to score goals, and has precise ball distribution in midfield.

== Career statistics ==
As of match played 7 November 2026

Appearances and goals by club, season and competition
Club	Season	League			Copa del Rey		Europe		Other		Total	
Club	Season	Division	Apps	Goals	Apps	Goals	Apps	Goals	Apps	Goals	Apps	Goals
Real Madrid C	2025–26	Segunda Federación	2	0	—		—		—		2	0
Real Madrid Castilla	2025–26	Primera Federación	14	0	—		—		—		14	0
Real Madrid	2025–26	La Liga	10	0	0	0	6 (Note: Appearances in UEFA Champions League)	0	0	0	16	0
Real Madrid	2026–27	La Liga	1	0	0	0	0	0	0	0	1	0
Real Madrid	Total		11	0	0	0	6	0	0	0	17	0
Career total			27	0	0	0	6	0	0	0	33	0

== Honours ==
Spain U19

- UEFA European Under-19 Championship: 2026

Individual

- UEFA European Under-19 Championship Team of the Tournament: 2026
