= Dmytro Bohdanov =

Ukrainian footballer (born 2007)

Personal information
- Full name: Dmytro Volodymyrovych Bohdanov
- Date of birth: 6 March 2007 (age 19)
- Place of birth: Kyiv, Ukraine
- Height: 1.84 m (6 ft 0 in)
- Position: Forward

Team information
- Current team: Energie Cottbus (on loan from Union Berlin)
- Number: 13

Youth career
- –2022: Dynamo Kyiv
- 2022–2025: Dynamo Dresden

Senior career*
Years	Team	Apps	(Gls)
2024–2025	Dynamo Dresden	6	(0)
2025–	Union Berlin	2	(0)
2026–	→ Energie Cottbus (loan)	2	(2)

International career^{‡}
2023–2024	Ukraine U17	9	(5)
2024–2026	Ukraine U19	13	(3)
2026–	Ukraine U21	1	(0)
- * Club domestic league appearances and goals as of 7 September 2026 ‡ National team caps and goals as of 27 September 2026

Dmytro Volodymyrovych Bohdanov (Ukrainian: Дмитро Володимирович Богданов; born 6 March 2007) is a Ukrainian professional footballer who plays as a forward for 2. Bundesliga club Energie Cottbus, on loan from Union Berlin.

== Early life ==
Bohdanov was born on 6 March 2007 in Kyiv, Ukraine. The son of Ukrainian footballer Volodymyr Bohdanov, he moved with his family to Germany in 2022 due to the Russian invasion of Ukraine.

== Club career ==
As a youth player, Bohdanov joined the youth academy of Ukrainian side Dynamo Kyiv. In 2022, he joined the youth academy of German side Dynamo Dresden and was promoted to the club's first team in 2024. On 4 May 2024, he debuted for the club during a 0–1 home loss to SC Verl in the league.

In August 2025, he moved to Bundesliga club Union Berlin. According to official information, he will train with the first team there, but is also slated to play for the Irons' U19 team.

On 19 August 2026, Bohdanov was loaned by Energie Cottbus in 2. Bundesliga.

== International career ==
Bohdanov is a Ukraine youth international. During the summer of 2024, he played for the Ukraine national under-17 football team at the 2024 UEFA European Under-17 Championship and played for the Ukraine national under-19 football team at the 2024 UEFA European Under-19 Championship and the 2026 UEFA European Under-19 Championship.

== Style of play ==
Bohdanov plays as a forward. Ukrainian news website Sport.ua wrote in 2024 that he is "distinguished by his physical qualities. A well-built player with good anthropometry. He can play as a forward or winger. Fast, technical".

== Career statistics ==
As of match played 16 May 2026

Appearances and goals by club, season and competition
Club	Season	League			Cup		Europe		Other		Total	
Club	Season	Division	Apps	Goals	Apps	Goals	Apps	Goals	Apps	Goals	Apps	Goals
Dynamo Dresden	2023–24	3. Liga	1	0	0	0	—		0	0	1	0
Dynamo Dresden	2024–25	3. Liga	5	0	0	0	—		0	0	5	0
Dynamo Dresden	Total		6	0	0	0	—		0	0	6	0
Union Berlin	2025–26	Bundesliga	1	0	—		—		—		1	0
Career total			7	0	0	0	0	0	0	0	7	0
