= José Antonio Morante (footballer, born 2007) =

Spanish footballer (born 2007)

Personal information
- Full name: José Antonio Morante Antúnez
- Date of birth: 28 February 2007 (age 19)
- Place of birth: La Puebla del Río, Spain
- Position: Winger

Team information
- Current team: Betis B
- Number: 27

Youth career
- –2023: Coria
- 2023–2025: Betis

Senior career*
Years	Team	Apps	(Gls)
2025–	Betis B	34	(8)
2025–	Betis	1	(1)

International career^{‡}
2025–	Spain U19	13	(5)
Medal record
Men's football
Representing Spain
UEFA European Under-19 Championship
Winner	2026 Wales
- * Club domestic league appearances and goals as of 12:57, 14 October 2026 (UTC) ‡ National team caps and goals as of 21:43, 12 July 2026 (UTC)

José Antonio Morante Antúnez (born 28 June 2007) is a Spanish professional footballer who plays as a winger for Betis Deportivo.

== Club career ==
Born in La Puebla del Río, Seville, Andalusia, Morante joined Real Betis' youth sides in 2022, from Coria CF. He made his senior debut with the reserves on 31 August 2025, starting in a 0–0 Primera Federación away draw against CD Teruel, and scored his first goal on 7 December, but in a 2–1 away loss to Antequera CF.

Morante made his first team debut on 22 January 2026, coming on as a second-half substitute for fellow youth graduate Pablo García in a 2–0 loss at PAOK FC, for the season's UEFA Europa League. On 13 July, he renewed his contract until 2030.

Morante made his LALIGA debut on 11 October 2026, coming on as a substitute in the 92nd minute for left winger Abde Ezzalzouli and subsequently scored 4 minutes later to seal a 5-2 win against CA Osasuna.

== International career ==
Morante is a Spain youth international. On 3 September 2025, he debuted for the Spain under-19 team during a 1–0 home friendly win over the Netherlands. He was also a part of the squad which won the 2026 UEFA European Under-19 Championship, being the nation's top scorer in the competition.

== Style of play ==
Morante plays as a winger. Left-footed, he is known for his versatility.

== Personal life ==
Morante is the son of Spanish bullfighter Morante de la Puebla.

== Honours ==
Spain U19

- UEFA European Under-19 Championship: 2026

Individual

- UEFA European Under-19 Championship top scorer: 2026
- UEFA European Under-19 Championship Team of the Tournament: 2026
