= Juan Hernández (footballer, born 2007) =

Spanish footballer (born 2007)

Personal information
- Full name: Juan Hernández Torres
- Date of birth: 21 July 2007 (age 19)
- Place of birth: Teruel, Spain
- Height: 1.78 m (5 ft 10 in)
- Positions: Attacking midfielder; winger

Team information
- Current team: Barcelona B

Youth career
- Las Viñas
- Atlético Teruel
- Zaragoza
- 2020–2026: Barcelona

Senior career*
Years	Team	Apps	(Gls)
2024–	Barcelona B	38	(4)

International career^{‡}
2021–2022	Spain U15	9	(3)
2022–2023	Spain U16	9	(1)
2023–2024	Spain U17	18	(2)
2024–	Spain U19	3	(0)
- * Club domestic league appearances and goals as of 15 May 2026 ‡ National team caps and goals as of 03:09, 31 October 2024 (UTC)

Juan Hernández Torres (born 21 July 2007) is a Spanish professional footballer who plays as an attacking midfielder or winger for Segunda Federación club Barcelona Atlètic.

== Early career ==
Born in Teruel, Aragon, Hernández started his youth career at local teams such Las Viñas and then Atlético Teruel, before signing for Real Zaragoza, where his grandfather Manuel Torres spent most of his playing career. In 2020, he joined the prestigious La Masia Academy of FC Barcelona.

== International career ==
In November 2023, Hernández was called up to the Spain U17 team for the 2023 FIFA U-17 World Cup. In the group stage game against Mali, he scored the only goal of the game to qualify his team to the round of 16. Later, Spain was eliminated by Germany in the quarter-finals.

== Playing style ==
Hernández is considered as a talented player of La Masia. He is said to have good goalscoring abilities. His technical quality and vision also allowed him to play well in several positions at the midfield, at the winger or as a false 9.
