= Lovro Chelfi =

Croatian footballer (born 2007)

Personal information
- Full name: Lovro Chelfi
- Date of birth: 30 January 2007 (age 19)
- Place of birth: Zagreb, Croatia
- Position: Midfielder

Team information
- Current team: Diriyah Club
- Number: 25

Youth career
- –2023: Dinamo
- 2024–2025: Kustošija
- 2025–2026: Barcelona

Senior career*
| Years | Team | Apps | (Gls) |
| 2024–2025 | Kustošija | 24 | (3) |
| 2026– | Diriyah Club | 2 | (0) |

International career^{‡}
| 2025 | Croatia U18 | 3 | (1) |
| 2024– | Croatia U19 | 1 | (0) |
- * Club domestic league appearances and goals ‡ National team caps and goals as of 7 June 2025

Lovro Chelfi (born 30 January 2007) is a Croatian professional footballer who plays as a midfielder for Diriyah Club in the Saudi Pro League.

== Early life ==
Chelfi was born on 30 January 2007 in Zagreb, Croatia. He is of Algerian descent. His father Jasen is a cellist for the Zagreb Philharmonic Orchestra.

== Club career ==
As a youth player, Chelfi joined the youth academy of Croatian side Dinamo. Following his stint there, he joined the youth academy of Croatian side Kustošija in 2024 and was promoted to the club's senior team the same year. Ahead of the 2025–26 season, he joined the youth academy of Spanish La Liga side Barcelona.

== International career ==
Chelfi is a Croatia youth international. During November 2024, he played for the Croatia national under-19 football team for 2025 UEFA European Under-19 Championship qualification.

== Style of play ==
Chelfi plays as a midfielder and is left-footed. Spanish news website Vavel wrote in 2025 that his " position is as an attacking midfielder, with a prodigious left foot capable of causing damage inside, although he has also played as a right winger thanks to his skill and speed . He's a player capable of creating numbers, with a great final pass thanks to his vision and tactical maturity".

== Career statistics ==
=== Club ===
As of 16 March 2025.

Appearances and goals by club, season and competition
| Club | Season | League | | | Cup | | Other | | Total | |
| Club | Season | Division | Apps | Goals | Apps | Goals | Apps | Goals | Apps | Goals |
|---|---|---|---|---|---|---|---|---|---|---|
| Kustošija | 2023–24 | Druga NL | 3 | 0 | 0 | 0 | 1 (Note: Appearances in the ZNS Cup) | 0 | 4 | 0 |
| Kustošija | 2024–25 | Druga NL | 21 | 3 | 2 (Note: Appearances in the Croatian Cup) | 0 | 2 | 0 | 25 | 3 |
| Career total | | | 24 | 3 | 2 | 0 | 3 | 0 | 29 | 3 |
