= Alfred Gøthler =

Danish footballer (born 2007)

Personal information
- Date of birth: 24 June 2007 (age 19)
- Place of birth: Greve Strand, Denmark
- Position: Forward

Team information
- Current team: Extremadura (on loan from Leganés)

Youth career
- Greve
- 2022–2024: HB Køge

Senior career*
Years	Team	Apps	(Gls)
2024–2026	HB Køge	51	(10)
2026–	Leganés	0	(0)
2026–	→ Extremadura (loan)	0	(0)

International career^{‡}
2024–2025	Denmark U18	6	(3)
2025–	Denmark U19	10	(2)
- * Club domestic league appearances and goals as of 2 June 2026 ‡ National team caps and goals as of 8 July 2026

Alfred Gøthler (born 24 June 2007) is a Danish professional footballer who plays as a forward for Spanish club CD Extremadura, on loan from CD Leganés.

== Club career ==
=== HB Køge ===
Gøthler joined HB Køge's youth sides in 2022, from affiliate club Greve, and signed a professional contract with the club on 16 May 2023, aged 16. He made his first team debut on 20 May 2024, coming on as a late substitute for Jafar Arias in a 3–1 1st Division away loss to FC Helsingør.

On 2 July 2024, Gøthler further extended his link until the end of 2027. In December 2024, he was awarded the Male Talent of the Year at Køge, before being definitely promoted to the main squad shortly after.

Gøthler scored his first senior goal on 16 May 2025, netting a last-minute winner in a 2–1 home success over B.93. Regularly used during the 2025–26 season, he scored four times and provided one assist in seven matches during the months of October and November 2025.

=== Leganés ===
On 24 February 2026, Spanish club CD Leganés announced the signing of Gøthler on a four-year contract, effective as of 1 July. After spending the entire pre-season with the side, he was loaned to Primera Federación club CD Extremadura on 29 August.

== International career ==
Gøthler represented Denmark at under-18 and under-19 levels.

== Personal life ==
Gøthler's father Henrik was also a footballer. He played for the club between 1992 and 1999, being named Player of the Year in 1995 and 1997.
