= Jorge Salinas (Spanish footballer) =

Spanish footballer (born 2007)

Personal information
- Full name: Jorge Salinas Viadero
- Date of birth: 3 April 2007 (age 19)
- Place of birth: Santander, Spain
- Height: 1.81 m (5 ft 11 in)
- Positions: Centre-back; left-back

Team information
- Current team: Racing Santander
- Number: 17

Youth career
- Marina Sport
- Monte
- Bansander
- 2019–2024: Racing Santander

Senior career*
Years	Team	Apps	(Gls)
2024–2025	Racing B	22	(1)
2024–	Racing Santander	35	(0)

International career^{‡}
2024–2025	Spain U18	4	(0)
2025–	Spain U19	9	(3)
Medal record
Men's football
Representing Spain
UEFA European Under-19 Championship
Winner	2026 Wales
- * Club domestic league appearances and goals as of 16 August 2026 ‡ National team caps and goals as of 22:57, 12 July 2026 (UTC)

Jorge Salinas Viadero (born 3 April 2007) is a Spanish professional footballer who plays as either a centre-back or a left-back for La Liga club Racing de Santander.

== Club career ==
Salinas was born in Santander, Cantabria, and joined Racing de Santander's youth setup from Bansander. He made his senior debut with the reserves on 31 August 2024, coming on as a half-time substitute in a 2–0 Segunda Federación home win over Llanera.

Salinas scored his first senior goal on 22 September 2024, netting the B's equalizer in a 1–1 away draw against Gimnástica de Torrelavega. He made his first team debut on 4 December, starting in a 1–0 home win over Sporting de Gijón, for the season's Copa del Rey.

On 19 March 2025, Salinas renewed his contract with the Verdiblancos until 2029. He became a regular starter during the 2025–26 campaign, featuring in 34 matches overall as the club achieved promotion to La Liga as champions.

Salinas made his debut in the main category of Spanish football on 16 August 2026, starting in a 2–2 home draw against Villarreal.

== International career ==
In May 2024, Salinas was included in Hernán Pérez's prelist in the Spain national under-17 team for the 2024 UEFA European Under-17 Championship, but was cut from the final squad. In August, he was called up to the under-18s.

== Honours ==
Racing Santander

- Segunda División: 2025–26

Spain U19

- UEFA European Under-19 Championship: 2026
