= Ousmane Diallo (footballer) =

Spanish footballer (born 2007)

Personal information
- Full name: Ousmane Diallo Thiao
- Date of birth: 12 June 2007 (age 19)
- Place of birth: Las Palmas, Spain
- Position: Right winger

Team information
- Current team: Parma
- Number: 7

Youth career
- –2020: Las Palmas
- 2020–2023: Alavés
- 2023–2025: Borussia Dortmund

Senior career*
Years	Team	Apps	(Gls)
2025–2026	Borussia Dortmund II	33	(0)
2026–	Parma	2	(0)

International career^{‡}
2021–2022	Spain U15	5	(1)
2022–2023	Spain U16	3	(0)
2023	Spain U17	3	(1)
2024–2025	Spain U18	4	(2)
2025–	Spain U19	7	(2)
Medal record
Men's football
Representing Spain
UEFA European Under-19 Championship
Winner	2026 Wales
- * Club domestic league appearances and goals as of 19 October 2026 ‡ National team caps and goals as of 31 March 2026

Ousmane Diallo Thiao (born 12 June 2007) is a Spanish professional footballer who plays as a right winger for Serie A club Parma.

== Early life ==
Diallo was born on 12 June 2007 in Las Palmas, Spain. He is of Senegalese descent through his parents. He is a native of Gran Canaria, Spain. He initially played as a goalkeeper while playing football at school. He has regarded Brazil international Neymar as his football idol.

== Club career ==
=== Borussia Dortmund ===
As a youth player, Diallo joined the youth academy of Spanish side Las Palmas. In 2020, he joined the youth academy of Spanish side Alavés. In 2023, he joined the youth academy of German side Borussia Dortmund. He played in the UEFA Youth League while playing for the club.

On 25 October 2024, Diallo made his professional debut for Borussia Dortmund II in the 3. Liga, coming on as an 82nd-minute substitute for Antonio Foti in a 5–3 away defeat to FC Ingolstadt.

=== Parma ===
On 31 July 2026, he transferred to Italian club Parma, permanently for an estimated €1.5 million fee and signed a contract until 2031, ahead of the 2026–27 season.

== International career ==
Diallo is a Spain youth international. He has played for the Spain under-15, under-16, and under-17 teams. He made five appearances and scored one goal while playing for the Spain under-15s. He made three appearances for the Spain under-16 team.

== Style of play ==
Diallo mainly operates as a winger. He has been described as "stands out for his ability to take on opposing defenders and, consequently, create dangerous actions. In addition, he is a great free kick taker and his style is very technical and showy".

== Honours ==
Spain U19

- UEFA European Under-19 Championship: 2026
