= Xavi Espart =

Spanish footballer (born 2007)

Personal information
- Full name: Xavier Espart Font
- Date of birth: 21 May 2007 (age 19)
- Place of birth: Barcelona, Spain
- Height: 1.75 m (5 ft 9 in)
- Positions: Full-back; defensive midfielder

Team information
- Current team: Barcelona
- Number: 12

Youth career
- 2013–2015: Vilassar de Mar
- 2015–2024: Barcelona

Senior career*
Years	Team	Apps	(Gls)
2024–2026	Barcelona B	20	(1)
2026–	Barcelona	12	(1)

International career^{‡}
2023–2024	Spain U17	7	(0)
2024–2025	Spain U18	4	(0)
2025–2026	Spain U19	10	(2)
2026–	Spain U21	2	(0)
Medal record
Men's football
Representing Spain
UEFA European Under-19 Championship
Winner	2026 Wales
- * Club domestic league appearances and goals as of 23:39, 25 October 2026 (UTC) ‡ National team caps and goals as of 22:38, 1 October 2026 (UTC)

Xavier Espart Font (Spanish pronunciation: [ˈʃaβj ˈspaɾt]; born 21 May 2007) is a Spanish professional footballer who plays as a right-back, left-back or defensive midfielder for La Liga club Barcelona.

== Early life ==
Born in Barcelona, Catalonia, Espart joined the youth academy of Barcelona at a young age in summer 2015 (age group u10) and progressed through the various youth categories of the club's renowned academy, La Masia. In order to join La Masia, he left his former club Vilassar de Mar. During his youth career, he developed a reputation for his tactical awareness, technical ability, and positional versatility, often being deployed both in defensive (right-back) and midfield roles. In his senior career, he has played as a right-back, successfully transitioning from his former midfield position; however, he has emphasized that he feels comfortable in both positions.

== Club career ==
Espart made his debut for Barcelona Atlètic on 31 August 2024, a 2–1 away loss to Andorra in the Primera Federación. During the 2024–25 and 2025–26 seasons, he became a regular member of the Barcelona Atlètic squad, contributing both defensively and in the team's build-up play, and signed a contract until 2028 on 11 August 2025.

On 11 March 2026, Espart made his Champions League debut for the senior team in a 1–1 away draw against Newcastle United in the knockout stage. He made his La Liga debut four days later, starting in a 5–2 win against Sevilla and playing the full match.

On 27 August 2026, Espart was definitely promoted to the main squad of Barça, being assigned the number 12 jersey. On 13 September, he scored his first goal against Levante in a La Liga match. On 20 October 2026, he scored the equaliser in the Champions League against holders Paris Saint-Germain at the Parc des Princes.

== International career ==
Espart has represented Spain at youth international level. He first appeared for the Spain U17 between 2023 and 2024 before progressing to the Spain U18 in 2024.

In July 2026, Espart was included in the Spain U19 squad for the UEFA European Under-19 Championship in Wales. Reverted to his developmental central midfield role for the tournament, he featured as a regular starter as Spain completed an undefeated run without conceding a single goal. He scored a goal in the opening group stage victory against host nation Wales and in the semi-final against Croatia and recorded three assists across the competition. In the final on 11 July 2026, Espart played when Spain defeated Germany 2-0 to claim their tenth U19 European title. Following the tournament, UEFA's Technical Observers selected him for the 2026 UEFA European Under-19 Championship Team of the Tournament for his role in dictating play between defense and attack.

== Style of play ==
Espart is known for his versatility, being capable of operating both as a right-back and as a defensive midfielder. As a defender, he is comfortable advancing into attacking areas and supporting possession-based play, while defensively, he is noted for his positioning and ability to read the game, with manager Hansi Flick comparing him to Philipp Lahm.

He is also capable of playing as an inverted full-back, moving into central midfield areas during possession to help control the tempo of play and assist in ball progression. His strengths include passing accuracy, tactical discipline and composure on the ball, attributes often associated with players developed in Barcelona's academy system.

== Career statistics ==
As of match played 25 October 2026

Appearances and goals by club, season and competition
Club	Season	League			Copa del Rey		Europe		Other		Total	
Club	Season	Division	Apps	Goals	Apps	Goals	Apps	Goals	Apps	Goals	Apps	Goals
Barcelona B	2024–25	Primera Federación	7	0	—		—		—		7	0
Barcelona B	2025–26	Segunda Federación	13	1	—		—		—		13	1
Barcelona B	Total		20	1	—		—		—		20	1
Barcelona	2025–26	La Liga	4	0	0	0	2 (Note: Appearances in UEFA Champions League)	0	0	0	6	0
Barcelona	2026–27	La Liga	8	1	0	0	1	1	0	0	9	2
Barcelona	Total		12	1	0	0	3	1	0	0	15	2
Career total			32	2	0	0	3	1	0	0	35	3

== Honours ==
Barcelona

- La Liga: 2025–26

Barcelona U19

- UEFA Youth League: 2024–25

Spain U19

- UEFA European Under-19 Championship: 2026

Individual

- UEFA European Under-19 Championship Team of the Tournament: 2026
