= Paco Esteban (footballer, born 1981) =

Spanish footballer

Personal information
- Full name: Francisco Esteban Granado
- Date of birth: 21 August 1981 (age 45)
- Place of birth: Granada, Spain
- Height: 1.78 m (5 ft 10 in)
- Position: Forward

Youth career
- Loja
- Granada

Senior career*
Years	Team	Apps	(Gls)
2000–2002	Granada B		
2002	Granada	4	(1)
2002–2005	Málaga B	101	(15)
2003–2006	Málaga	18	(0)
2006	→ Ciudad Murcia (loan)	13	(1)
2006–2007	Poli Ejido	37	(4)
2007–2008	Granada 74	6	(1)
2008–2009	Girona	25	(1)
2010	Elche	10	(0)
2010–2011	Ontinyent	16	(3)
2011–2012	Alcoyano	35	(2)
Total		265	(28)
- * Club domestic league appearances and goals

Francisco "Paco" Esteban Granado (born 21 August 1981 in Granada, Andalusia) is a Spanish retired footballer who played as a forward.
