= Spain national under-19 football team =

Under-19 association football team representing Spain

Spain U-19
- Nickname: La Rojita (The Little Red One)
- Association: Real Federación Española de Fútbol (RFEF)
- Confederation: UEFA (Europe)
- Head coach: Paco Gallardo
- Most caps: Yarek Gasiorowski (28)
- Top scorer: Juan Mata (12)
- FIFA code: ESP
First colours	Second colours

First international
- Spain 2–0 Switzerland (Monzón, Spain; 3 October 2001)

Biggest win
- Spain 8–1 Cyprus (Torrevieja, Spain; 28 May 2006)

Biggest defeat
- Turkey 3–0 Spain (Chiajna, Romania; 26 July 2011); England 3–0 Spain (Burton upon Trent, England; 24 March 2017) Records for competitive matches only.

European Under-19 Championship
- Appearances: 16 (first in 2002)
- Best result: Winners (2002, 2004, 2006, 2007, 2011, 2012, 2015, 2019, 2024, 2026)

Spain national under-19 football team
Medal record

U-19 European Championship
Gold medal – first place	2002 Norway	Team
Gold medal – first place	2004 Switzerland	Team
Gold medal – first place	2006 Poland	Team
Gold medal – first place	2007 Austria	Team
Silver medal – second place	2010 France	Team
Gold medal – first place	2011 Romania	Team
Gold medal – first place	2012 Estonia	Team
Gold medal – first place	2015 Greece	Team
Gold medal – first place	2019 Armenia	Team
Gold medal – first place	2024 Northern Ireland	Team
Silver medal – second place	2025 Romania	Team
Gold medal – first place	2026 Wales	Team

The Spain national under-19 football team represents Royal Spanish Football Federation, the governing body for football in Spain, in international football at this age level. It is the most successful U-19 national team in Europe with twelve continental titles.

== Competitive record ==
=== UEFA European Under-19 Championship ===
UEFA European Under-19 Championship record								Qualification record					
Year	Round	GP	W	D*	L	GS	GA	GP	W	D*	L	GS	GA
(Norway) 2002	Champions	4	3	1	0	8	2						
(Liechtenstein) 2003	did not qualify							3	1	1	1	3	2
(Switzerland) 2004	Champions	5	4	1	0	13	5						
(Northern Ireland) 2005	did not qualify							3	2	0	1	5	1
(Poland) 2006	Champions	5	4	1	0	17	5						
(Austria) 2007	Champions	5	2	3	0	4	1						
(Czech Republic) 2008	Group Stage	3	1	0	2	5	3						
(Ukraine) 2009	Group Stage	3	1	0	2	3	4						
(France) 2010	Runners-up	5	4	0	1	10	5						
(Romania) 2011	Champions	5	4	0	1	16	6						
(Estonia) 2012	Champions	5	3	2	0	11	6						
(Lithuania) 2013	Semi-finals	4	3	0	1	7	4						
(Hungary) 2014	did not qualify							3	2	0	1	6	4
(Greece) 2015	Champions	5	3	1	1	9	4	3	3	0	0	13	1
(Germany) 2016	did not qualify							3	1	1	1	3	3
(Georgia (country)) 2017	did not qualify							3	2	0	1	7	3
(Finland) 2018	did not qualify							3	1	1	1	5	4
(Armenia) 2019	Champions	5	3	2	0	7	3	6	5	1	0	17	3
2020 and 2021 were cancelled due to COVID-19 pandemic
(Slovakia) 2022	did not qualify							5	2	3	0	15	8
(Malta) 2023	Semi-finals	4	2	1	1	9	4	5	3	2	0	13	0
(Northern Ireland) 2024	Champions	5	3	2	0	8	4	6	5	1	0	16	3
(Romania) 2025	Runners-up	5	4	0	1	15	7	3	2	1	0	8	4
(Wales) 2026	Champions	5	5	0	0	19	0	3	3	0	0	11	0
Total:15/21	10 Titles	73	49	14	10	161	63	-	-	-	-	-	-

*Denotes draws include knockout matches decided on penalty kicks.

- Gold background color indicates first-place finish. Silver background color indicates second-place finish.

== Individual awards ==
Spain's U-19 players have won individual awards at UEFA European Under-19 Football Championship tournaments.

Year	Golden Player	Golden Boot
(Norway) 2002	Fernando Torres	Fernando Torres
(Switzerland) 2004	Juanfran	
(Poland) 2006	Alberto Bueno	Alberto Bueno
(France) 2010		Dani Pacheco
(Romania) 2011	Álex Fernández	Álvaro Morata
(Estonia) 2012	Gerard Deulofeu	Jesé
(Greece) 2015	Marco Asensio	Borja Mayoral
(Malta) 2023		Víctor Barberá
(Northern Ireland) 2024	Iker Bravo	
(Romania) 2025		Pablo García
(Wales) 2026	Quim Junyent	José Morante

== Players ==
=== Current squad ===
The following players were named in the preliminary squad for the 2026 UEFA European Under-19 Championship to be played 28 June–11 July 2026.

No.	Pos.	Player	Date of birth (age)	Club
	GK	Manu González	18 April 2007 (age 19)	(Royal Spanish Football Federation) Real Betis
	GK	Símon García	19 April 2007 (age 19)	(Royal Spanish Football Federation) CD Basconia
	GK	Iker Rodríguez	22 February 2008 (age 18)	(Royal Spanish Football Federation) Barcelona
	GK	Pablo Mollà	15 May 2008 (age 18)	(Royal Spanish Football Federation) Valencia
	DF	Diego Aguado	7 February 2007 (age 19)	(Royal Spanish Football Federation) Real Madrid
	DF	Albert Navarro	24 May 2007 (age 19)	(Italian Football Federation) Atalanta
	DF	Mario Rivas	16 March 2007 (age 19)	(Royal Spanish Football Federation) Real Madrid
	DF	Alex Campos	2 February 2008 (age 18)	(Royal Spanish Football Federation) Barcelona
	DF	Ale Gomes	14 February 2008 (age 18)	(Royal Spanish Football Federation) Real Zaragoza
	DF	Anxo Rodríguez	10 March 2007 (age 19)	(Royal Spanish Football Federation) Celta Vigo
	DF	Álvaro Lezcano	2 March 2008 (age 18)	(Royal Spanish Football Federation) Real Madrid
	DF	Miguel Gil	28 April 2008 (age 18)	(Royal Spanish Football Federation) Atlético Madrid
	DF	Jorge Salinas	3 April 2007 (age 19)	(Royal Spanish Football Federation) Racing Santander
	DF	Iker Quintero	27 January 2008 (age 18)	(Royal Spanish Football Federation) CD Basconia
	DF	Xavi Espart	21 May 2007 (age 19)	(Royal Spanish Football Federation) Barcelona
	DF	Jesús Fortea	26 March 2007 (age 19)	(Royal Spanish Football Federation) Real Madrid
	DF	Nacho Pérez	29 August 2008 (age 18)	(Royal Spanish Football Federation) Levante
	MF	Thiago Pitarch	3 August 2007 (age 19)	(Royal Spanish Football Federation) Real Madrid
	MF	Guille Fernández	18 June 2008 (age 18)	(Royal Spanish Football Federation) Barcelona
	MF	Selton Sánchez	20 February 2007 (age 19)	(Royal Spanish Football Federation) Athletic Bilbao
	MF	Carlos Macià	1 September 2008 (age 18)	(Royal Spanish Football Federation) Villarreal
	MF	Nico Guillén	30 January 2008 (age 18)	(Royal Spanish Football Federation) Sevilla
	MF	Andrés Antañón	22 January 2007 (age 19)	(Royal Spanish Football Federation) Celta Vigo
	MF	Quim Junyent	25 March 2007 (age 19)	(Royal Spanish Football Federation) Barcelona
	MF	Dilan Zárate	1 August 2007 (age 19)	(Royal Spanish Football Federation) Cádiz
	MF	Miguel Romero	22 March 2008 (age 18)	(Royal Spanish Football Federation) Real Betis
	MF	Dro Fernández	12 January 2008 (age 18)	(French Football Federation) PSG
	MF	Dani Fernández	26 January 2008 (age 18)	(Royal Spanish Football Federation) Tenerife
	FW	Ousmane Diallo	12 June 2007 (age 19)	(German Football Association) Borussia Dortmund
	FW	Hugo López	4 March 2007 (age 19)	(Royal Spanish Football Federation) Villarreal
	FW	Paco Cortés	11 August 2007 (age 19)	(Royal Spanish Football Federation) Levante
	FW	Joselillo Gaitán	25 February 2007 (age 19)	(Royal Spanish Football Federation) Villarreal
	FW	Alexis Ciria	4 January 2008 (age 18)	(Royal Spanish Football Federation) Real Madrid
	FW	Manuel Ángel Castillo	12 June 2008 (age 18)	(Royal Spanish Football Federation) Sevilla
	FW	Jorge Pérez-Lafuente	16 May 2008 (age 18)	(Royal Spanish Football Federation) Celta Vigo
	FW	Daniel Yáñez	28 March 2007 (age 19)	(Royal Spanish Football Federation) Real Madrid
	FW	José Antonio Morante	28 June 2007 (age 19)	(Royal Spanish Football Federation) Real Betis
	FW	Miguel Cubo	8 February 2008 (age 18)	(Royal Spanish Football Federation) Atlético Madrid
	FW	Asier Bonel	17 January 2008 (age 18)	(Royal Spanish Football Federation) Osasuna
	FW	Rubén de Sá	3 March 2008 (age 18)	(Royal Spanish Football Federation) Real Betis

=== Recent call-ups ===
The following players have been called up within the last twelve months are still eligible for selection.

Pos.	Player	Date of birth (age)	Caps	Goals	Club	Latest call-up
GK	Manu González	18 April 2007 (age 19)	3	0	(Spain) Real Betis	v. Latvia, 25 March 2025
GK	Fran Árbol	30 June 2006 (age 20)	1	0	(Spain) Granada	v. Romania, 15 October 2024
GK	Yago Moreira	29 April 2006 (age 20)	1	0	(Spain) Villarreal	v. Romania, 15 October 2024
DF	Héctor Fort	2 August 2006 (age 20)	6	0	(Spain) Barcelona	v. Latvia, 25 March 2025
DF	Diego Aguado	7 February 2007 (age 19)	4	0	(Spain) Real Madrid	v. Latvia, 25 March 2025
DF	Jesús Fortea	26 March 2007 (age 19)	4	0	(Spain) Real Madrid	v. Latvia, 25 March 2025
DF	Víctor Valdepeñas	20 October 2006 (age 20)	3	0	(Spain) Real Madrid	v. Latvia, 25 March 2025
DF	Buba Sangaré	6 August 2007 (age 19)	5	0	(Italy) Roma	v. Austria, 19 November 2024
DF	Óscar Mesa	3 July 2006 (age 20)	3	0	(Spain) Real Madrid	v. Romania, 15 October 2024
DF	Beñat Larrea	12 February 2006 (age 20)	2	0	(Spain) Athletic Bilbao	v. Norway, 17 February 2025
DF	Óscar Masqué	15 January 2007 (age 19)	1	0	(Spain) Real Betis	v. Norway, 17 February 2025
DF	Javier Gil	3 May 2006 (age 20)	1	0	(Italy) Juventus	v. Romania, 15 October 2024
DF	Bruno Martínez	19 June 2006 (age 20)	1	0	(Italy) Juventus	v. Romania, 15 October 2024
DF	Daniel Budesca	27 May 2006 (age 20)	1	0	(Spain) Villarreal	v. Italy, 15 January 2025
DF	José Ángel López	1 January 2006 (age 20)	1	0	(Spain) Espanyol	v. Italy, 15 January 2025
MF	Pau Prim	22 February 2006 (age 20)	7	1	(Spain) Barcelona	v. Italy, 15 January 2025
MF	Guille Fernández	18 June 2008 (age 18)	7	0	(Spain) Barcelona	v. Italy, 15 January 2025
MF	Juan Hernández	21 July 2007 (age 19)	3	0	(Spain) Barcelona	v. Romania, 15 October 2024
MF	Aarón Martin	24 November 2006 (age 19)	2	0	(Spain) Tenerife	v. Norway, 17 February 2025
MF	Jorge Castillo	23 May 2006 (age 20)	1	0	(Spain) Atlético Madrid	v. Norway, 17 February 2025
MF	Joan Oleaga	7 March 2006 (age 20)	1	0	(Spain) Real Sociedad	v. Norway, 17 February 2025
MF	Roberto Martín	12 August 2006 (age 20)	1	0	(Spain) Real Madrid	v. Romania, 15 October 2024
MF	Hugo Burcio	31 October 2006 (age 20)	1	0	(Spain) Celta Vigo	v. Italy, 15 January 2025
FW	Marc Guiu	4 January 2006 (age 20)	9	1	(England) Sunderland	v. Austria, 19 November 2024
FW	Elijah Gift	11 June 2006 (age 20)	5	0	(Spain) Athletic Bilbao	v. Austria, 19 November 2024
FW	Pablo López	27 March 2006 (age 20)	5	0	(Spain) Valencia	v. Norway, 17 February 2025
FW	Ángel Arcos	18 April 2006 (age 20)	3	0	(Spain) Celta Vigo	v. Norway, 17 February 2025
FW	Aimar Blázquez	19 March 2006 (age 20)	2	0	(Spain) Valencia	v. Norway, 17 February 2025
FW	Arturo Rodríguez	5 August 2006 (age 20)	1	1	(Spain) Las Palmas	v. Italy, 15 January 2025
^{PRE} Preliminary squad

== Player records ==
=== Top Appearances ===
Players in bold are still active with the team.

Rank	Player	Club(s)	Year(s)	U-19 Caps
1	Yarek Gasiorowski	Valencia	2022–2024	28
2	Aarón Ñíguez	Valencia, Xerez, Iraklis	2006–2008	23
	Dani Muñoz	Atlético Madrid	2023–2025	23
4	Emilio Nsue	Mallorca	2006–2008	21
5	Jorge Pulido	Atlético Madrid	2008–2010	20
	Juanmi Jiménez	Málaga	2011–2012	20
7	Gerard Deulofeu	Barcelona	2011–2012	19
	Juan Miranda	Barcelona	2017–2019	19
9	César Azpilicueta	Osasuna	2007–2008	18
	Daniel Aquino	Murcia	2007–2009	18
	Carlos Fernández	Sevilla	2013–2015	18
	Antonio Marín	Almería	2013–2015	18
	Abel Ruiz	Barcelona	2017–2019	18
	Aarón Martín	Espanyol	2014–2016	18

Note: Club(s) represents the permanent clubs during the player's time in the Under-19s.

=== Top Goalscorers ===
Players in bold are still active with the team.

Rank	Player	Club(s)	Year(s)	U-19 Goals
**1**	Juan Mata	Real Madrid	2006–2007	12
**2**	Alberto Bueno	Real Madrid	2006–2007	11
	Álvaro Morata	Real Madrid	2010–2011	11
	Borja Mayoral	Real Madrid	2014–2016	11
**5**	Ferran Torres	Valencia	2018–2019	9
	Víctor Barberà	Barcelona	2022–2023	9
**7**	Aarón Ñíguez	Valencia, Xerez, Iraklis	2006–2008	8
	Pablo Sarabia	Real Madrid, Getafe	2010–2011	8
	Juanmi Jiménez	Málaga	2011–2012	8
	Marco Asensio	Mallorca, Real Madrid	2014–2015	8
	Yarek Gasiorowski	Valencia	2022–2024	8

Note: Club(s) represents the permanent clubs during the player's time in the Under-19s.

== Former squads ==
- 2025 UEFA European Under-19 Championship squads – Spain
- 2024 UEFA European Under-19 Championship squads – Spain
- 2023 UEFA European Under-19 Championship squads – Spain
- 2019 UEFA European Under-19 Championship squads – Spain
- 2015 UEFA European Under-19 Championship squads – Spain
- 2013 UEFA European Under-19 Championship squads – Spain
- 2012 UEFA European Under-19 Championship squads – Spain
- 2011 UEFA European Under-19 Championship squads – Spain
- 2010 UEFA European Under-19 Championship squads – Spain
- 2009 UEFA European Under-19 Championship squads – Spain
- 2008 UEFA European Under-19 Championship squads – Spain
- 2007 UEFA European Under-19 Championship squads – Spain
- 2006 UEFA European Under-19 Championship squads – Spain
- 2004 UEFA European Under-19 Championship squads – Spain
- 2002 UEFA European Under-19 Championship squads – Spain

== See also ==
- Spain national football team
- Spain national under-23 football team
- Spain national under-21 football team
- Spain national under-20 football team
- Spain national under-18 football team
- Spain national under-17 football team
- Spain national under-16 football team
- Spain national under-15 football team
- Spain national youth football team
