= 2024 UEFA European Under-17 Championship squads =

Youth football tournament in Europe

This article describes about the squads for the 2024 UEFA European Under-17 Championship in Cyprus. Each national team had to submit a squad of 20 players born on or after 1 January 2007.

All ages are as of 20 May 2024, the day before the start of tournament.

== Group A ==
=== Cyprus ===
Head coach: Chrysis Michael

No.	Pos.	Player	Date of birth (age)	Club
1	GK	Stavros Panagi	8 May 2007 (aged 17)	(Cyprus Football Association) AEK
12	GK	Savvas Michos	3 December 2007 (aged 16)	(Cyprus Football Association) APOEL
2	DF	Georgios Skafi	17 June 2007 (aged 16)	(Italian Football Federation) Sampdoria
3	DF	Panagiotis Charalampous	7 October 2007 (aged 16)	(Cyprus Football Association) AEK
5	DF	Kosmas Ioannou	29 January 2007 (aged 17)	(Cyprus Football Association) Apollon
6	DF	Maximos Petousis	1 February 2007 (aged 17)	(Cyprus Football Association) AEK
21	DF	Rafail Dimosthenous	5 June 2007 (aged 16)	(Cyprus Football Association) Aris
8	MF	Gavriel Psilogenis	20 March 2007 (aged 17)	(Cyprus Football Association) Omonia
10	MF	Argyris Christodoulou	1 May 2007 (aged 17)	(Portuguese Football Federation) Sporting CP
13	MF	Georgios Tziortzis	10 August 2007 (aged 16)	(Cyprus Football Association) APOEL
14	MF	Antreas Angelidis	24 June 2007 (aged 16)	(Cyprus Football Association) APOEL
15	MF	Theoklitos Polychroniou	26 August 2007 (aged 16)	(Cyprus Football Association) AEL
16	MF	Marios Chatzilefteri	18 February 2007 (aged 17)	(Cyprus Football Association) Paralimni
17	MF	Charalampos Michalas	16 July 2007 (aged 16)	(Cyprus Football Association) Anorthosis
18	MF	Stefanos Vasiliou	28 November 2007 (aged 16)	(Cyprus Football Association) AEK
7	FW	Chrysis Evangelou	3 November 2007 (aged 16)	(Cyprus Football Association) Omonia
9	FW	Petros Ioannou	29 September 2007 (aged 16)	(Cyprus Football Association) AEK
11	FW	Christos Loukaidis	14 March 2007 (aged 17)	(Cyprus Football Association) AEK
20	FW	Anninos Nikolaou	12 February 2007 (aged 17)	(Cyprus Football Association) Aris
23	FW	Stavros Dimosthenous	5 June 2007 (aged 16)	(Cyprus Football Association) Aris

=== Czech Republic ===
Head coach: Jiří Žilák

No.	Pos.	Player	Date of birth (age)	Club
1	GK	Marek Obdržálek	3 March 2007 (aged 17)	(Football Association of the Czech Republic) Slavia Prague
16	GK	Matyáš Šilhavý	6 March 2007 (aged 17)	(Football Association of the Czech Republic) Viktoria Plzeň
2	DF	Štěpán Beran	24 May 2007 (aged 16)	(Football Association of the Czech Republic) Slavia Prague
3	DF	David Řeháček	3 July 2007 (aged 16)	(Football Association of the Czech Republic) Baník Ostrava
4	DF	Jiří Míček	7 June 2007 (aged 16)	(Football Association of the Czech Republic) Baník Ostrava
12	DF	Jakub Kolísek	14 August 2007 (aged 16)	(Football Association of the Czech Republic) Slavia Prague
13	DF	Dennis Krpálek	6 October 2007 (aged 16)	(Football Association of the Czech Republic) Sparta Prague
6	MF	Patrik Siegl	4 October 2007 (aged 16)	(Football Association of the Czech Republic) Sigma Olomouc
8	MF	Šimon Slončík	15 May 2007 (aged 17)	(Football Association of the Czech Republic) Slavia Prague
9	MF	Daniel Švancara	3 January 2007 (aged 17)	(Football Association of the Czech Republic) Zbrojovka Brno
10	MF	Marek Naskos	29 June 2007 (aged 16)	(Football Association of the Czech Republic) Slavia Prague
11	MF	Lukáš Moudrý	19 January 2007 (aged 17)	(Football Association of the Czech Republic) Sparta Prague
14	MF	Ondřej Penxa	23 March 2007 (aged 17)	(Football Association of the Czech Republic) Sparta Prague
15	MF	Jiří Panoš	15 November 2007 (aged 16)	(Football Association of the Czech Republic) Viktoria Plzeň
17	MF	Adam Sosna	18 January 2007 (aged 17)	(Italian Football Federation) Juventus
18	MF	Kryštof Čížek	4 January 2008 (aged 16)	(Football Association of the Czech Republic) Slavia Prague
20	MF	Karel Belžík	16 October 2007 (aged 16)	(Football Association of the Czech Republic) Slavia Prague
21	MF	Josef Kolařík	16 January 2007 (aged 17)	(Football Association of the Czech Republic) Slavia Prague
7	FW	Matěj Kvaček	22 May 2007 (aged 16)	(Football Association of the Czech Republic) Pardubice
19	FW	Matyáš Nechvátal	20 January 2007 (aged 17)	(Football Association of the Czech Republic) Bohemians 1905

=== Serbia ===
Head coach: Jovan Damjanović

No.	Pos.	Player	Date of birth (age)	Club
1	GK	Vukašin Jovanović	30 September 2007 (aged 16)	(Football Association of Serbia) Partizan
12	GK	Vladan Čarapić	30 January 2007 (aged 17)	(Football Association of Serbia) Čukarički
3	DF	Relja Premović	3 November 2007 (aged 16)	(Football Association of Serbia) Partizan
4	DF	Veljko Milosavljević	28 June 2007 (aged 16)	(Football Association of Serbia) Crvena zvezda
5	DF	Viktor Stojanović	2 October 2007 (aged 16)	(Football Association of Serbia) Crvena zvezda
6	DF	Vuk Roganović	4 January 2007 (aged 17)	(Football Association of Serbia) Crvena zvezda
7	DF	Igor Bubanja	8 January 2007 (aged 17)	(Football Association of Serbia) Crvena zvezda
15	DF	Nikola Simić	30 March 2007 (aged 17)	(Football Association of Serbia) Partizan
8	MF	Aleksa Vasilić	7 November 2007 (aged 16)	(Football Association of Serbia) Crvena zvezda
10	MF	Andrija Maksimović	5 June 2007 (aged 16)	(Football Association of Serbia) Crvena zvezda
11	MF	Uroš Đorđević	30 November 2007 (aged 16)	(Football Association of Serbia) Crvena zvezda
14	MF	Đorđe Ranković	16 November 2007 (aged 16)	(Football Association of Serbia) Crvena zvezda
16	MF	Uroš Đorđević	28 April 2007 (aged 17)	(Football Association of Serbia) Grafičar
18	MF	Stefan Mladenović	12 September 2007 (aged 16)	(Football Association of Serbia) Čukarički
20	MF	Vasilije Kostov	11 May 2008 (aged 16)	(Football Association of Serbia) Crvena zvezda
21	MF	Dušan Makević	30 April 2007 (aged 17)	(Football Association of Serbia) Partizan
22	MF	Jovan Ćirić	25 February 2007 (aged 17)	(Football Association of Serbia) Mladost Lučani
9	FW	Mihajlo Cvetković	10 January 2007 (aged 17)	(Football Association of Serbia) Čukarički
17	FW	Aleksa Damjanović	4 December 2008 (aged 15)	(Football Association of Serbia) Crvena zvezda
19	FW	Bogdan Kostić	17 January 2007 (aged 17)	(Football Association of Serbia) Partizan

=== Ukraine ===
Head coach: Yuriy Moroz

No.	Pos.	Player	Date of birth (age)	Club
1	GK	Nazar Makarenko	21 June 2007 (aged 16)	(Ukrainian Association of Football) Dnipro-1
12	GK	Oleksandr Petrenko	26 March 2007 (aged 17)	(German Football Association) Bayer Leverkusen
2	DF	Mykyta Sheleketa	20 February 2007 (aged 17)	(Ukrainian Association of Football) Shakhtar Donetsk
3	DF	Demian Tretiak	23 May 2007 (aged 16)	(Ukrainian Association of Football) Dynamo Kyiv
4	DF	Oleksii Rybak	18 April 2007 (aged 17)	(Ukrainian Association of Football) Dynamo Kyiv
5	DF	Kyrylo Dihtyar	25 November 2007 (aged 16)	(Ukrainian Association of Football) Metalist Kharkiv
11	DF	Dmytro Strilchuk	8 March 2007 (aged 17)	(German Football Association) Bayern Munich
13	DF	Yehor Dankovskyi	19 March 2007 (aged 17)	(Ukrainian Association of Football) Shakhtar Donetsk
16	DF	Maksym Barshak	28 February 2007 (aged 17)	(Ukrainian Association of Football) Rukh Lviv
6	MF	Oleksandr Soroka	12 January 2007 (aged 17)	(Royal Belgian Football Association) Gent
7	MF	André Vakulyuk	20 March 2007 (aged 17)	(Portuguese Football Federation) Benfica
8	MF	Bohdan Olychenko	18 January 2007 (aged 17)	(German Football Association) Bayern Munich
10	MF	Oleksandr Dragan	27 February 2007 (aged 17)	(Italian Football Federation) Atalanta
14	MF	Nazar Bondar	18 January 2007 (aged 17)	(Ukrainian Association of Football) Rukh Lviv
15	MF	Pavlo Liusin	23 February 2008 (aged 16)	(Ukrainian Association of Football) Dynamo Kyiv
18	MF	Bohdan Popov	4 April 2007 (aged 17)	(Italian Football Federation) Empoli
19	MF	Bohdan Redushko	7 January 2007 (aged 17)	(Ukrainian Association of Football) Dynamo Kyiv
9	FW	Artem Stepanov	10 August 2007 (aged 16)	(German Football Association) Bayer Leverkusen
17	FW	Ivan Denysov	28 March 2007 (aged 17)	(Ukrainian Association of Football) Rukh Lviv
20	FW	Dmytro Bohdanov	6 March 2007 (aged 17)	(German Football Association) Dynamo Dresden

== Group B ==
=== Austria ===
Head coach: Martin Scherb

No.	Pos.	Player	Date of birth (age)	Club
1	GK	Marcel Kurz	15 March 2007 (aged 17)	(Austrian Football Association) St. Pölten
21	GK	Christian Zawieschitzky	2 May 2007 (aged 17)	(Austrian Football Association) Salzburg
2	DF	Eaden Roka	3 September 2007 (aged 16)	(Austrian Football Association) Rapid Wien
4	DF	Valentin Zabransky	2 February 2007 (aged 17)	(Austrian Football Association) Salzburg
5	DF	Silvio Zinner	9 February 2007 (aged 17)	(German Football Association) Union Berlin
13	DF	Jonas Ilk	6 April 2007 (aged 17)	(Austrian Football Association) LASK
14	DF	Magnus Dalpiaz	20 February 2007 (aged 17)	(German Football Association) Bayern Munich
18	DF	Oliver Sorg	31 July 2007 (aged 16)	(Austrian Football Association) Sturm Graz
22	DF	Julian Höller	11 December 2007 (aged 16)	(Austrian Football Association) Austria Wien
6	MF	Philipp Maybach	14 December 2007 (aged 16)	(Austrian Football Association) Austria Wien
8	MF	Ilia Ivanschitz	7 April 2007 (aged 17)	(Austrian Football Association) Salzburg
10	MF	Ensar Mušić	9 September 2007 (aged 16)	(Austrian Football Association) Rapid Wien
15	MF	Jacob Hödl	31 January 2007 (aged 17)	(Austrian Football Association) Sturm Graz
16	MF	Yanik Spalt	3 September 2007 (aged 16)	(German Football Association) VfB Stuttgart
7	FW	Adrian Riegel	14 September 2007 (aged 16)	(Austrian Football Association) St. Pölten
9	FW	Oghenetejiri Adejenughure	4 February 2007 (aged 17)	(Austrian Football Association) Salzburg
11	FW	Thierry Fidjeu-Tazemeta	27 July 2007 (aged 16)	(German Football Association) Borussia Dortmund
17	FW	Mauro Hämmerle	17 October 2007 (aged 16)	(German Football Association) Augsburg
19	FW	Philipp Moizi	30 May 2007 (aged 16)	(Austrian Football Association) Rapid Wien
20	FW	Florian Hangl	7 April 2007 (aged 17)	(German Football Association) Augsburg

=== Croatia ===
Head coach: Marijan Budimir

No.	Pos.	Player	Date of birth (age)	Club
1	GK	Adrian Hrvojević	24 March 2007 (aged 17)	(United States Soccer Federation) Chicago Fire
12	GK	Antonio Rajić	4 March 2007 (aged 17)	(Croatian Football Federation) Dinamo Zagreb
2	DF	Noa Mikić	27 January 2007 (aged 17)	(Croatian Football Federation) Dinamo Zagreb
3	DF	Duje Milišić	20 May 2007 (aged 17)	(Croatian Football Federation) Hajduk Split
4	DF	Marko Zebić	8 January 2007 (aged 17)	(Croatian Football Federation) Dinamo Zagreb
5	DF	Ljubo Puljić	31 May 2007 (aged 16)	(German Football Association) Bayern Munich
13	DF	Kristian Mandić	2 October 2007 (aged 16)	(German Football Association) Eintracht Frankfurt
15	DF	Raul Kumar	6 February 2008 (aged 16)	(Croatian Football Federation) Istra
16	DF	Karlo Pajsar	7 March 2008 (aged 16)	(Croatian Football Federation) Dinamo Zagreb
6	MF	Roko Vojvodić	21 February 2008 (aged 16)	(Croatian Football Federation) Hajduk Split
8	MF	Tomas Baković	29 March 2007 (aged 17)	(Croatian Football Federation) Dinamo Zagreb
17	MF	Dukan Ahmeti	26 October 2007 (aged 16)	(Croatian Football Federation) Istra
18	MF	Petar Kostelac	17 March 2008 (aged 16)	(Croatian Football Federation) Lokomotiva Zagreb
20	MF	Niko Horvat	15 July 2008 (aged 15)	(German Football Association) Borussia Mönchengladbach
7	FW	Bruno Durdov	11 December 2007 (aged 16)	(Croatian Football Federation) Hajduk Split
9	FW	Mislav Ćutuk	25 January 2007 (aged 17)	(Croatian Football Federation) Dinamo Zagreb
10	FW	Patrice Čović	25 June 2007 (aged 16)	(German Football Association) Hertha BSC
11	FW	Patrik Marić	27 July 2007 (aged 16)	(Croatian Football Federation) Slaven Belupo
14	FW	Luka Vrzić	5 January 2007 (aged 17)	(Croatian Football Federation) Gorica
19	FW	Ivan Barić	10 January 2007 (aged 17)	(Croatian Football Federation) Osijek

=== Denmark ===
Head coach: Jesper Mikkelsen

No.	Pos.	Player	Date of birth (age)	Club
1	GK	Tobias Breum-Harild	25 October 2007 (aged 16)	(Danish Football Association) Copenhagen
16	GK	Viktor De Paoli	1 August 2007 (aged 16)	(Danish Football Association) AGF
2	DF	Victor Gustafsen	14 November 2007 (aged 16)	(Danish Football Association) Nordsjælland
3	DF	Rasmus Düring	17 March 2007 (aged 17)	(Danish Football Association) AGF
4	DF	Noah Markmann	24 February 2007 (aged 17)	(Danish Football Association) Nordsjælland
5	DF	Graham Ankamafio	10 September 2007 (aged 16)	(Danish Football Association) Copenhagen
12	DF	Philip Søndergaard	28 February 2007 (aged 17)	(Danish Football Association) Brøndby
13	DF	Frej Andersen	5 May 2007 (aged 17)	(Danish Football Association) AGF
17	DF	Valdemar Lützhøft	16 November 2007 (aged 16)	(Danish Football Association) Lyngby
6	MF	Noah Lassen	13 January 2007 (aged 17)	(Danish Football Association) OB
8	MF	Oliver Højer	24 January 2007 (aged 17)	(Danish Football Association) Copenhagen
14	MF	Aksel Jørgensen	11 January 2007 (aged 17)	(Danish Football Association) Lyngby
15	MF	Malte Heyde	18 February 2007 (aged 17)	(Danish Football Association) Nordsjælland
18	MF	Sofus Johannesen	4 May 2007 (aged 17)	(Danish Football Association) Midtjylland
20	MF	Olti Hyseni	17 July 2007 (aged 16)	(Danish Football Association) Sønderjyske
7	FW	Jonathan Moalem	1 February 2007 (aged 17)	(Danish Football Association) Copenhagen
9	FW	Chidozie Obi	29 November 2007 (aged 16)	(The Football Association) Arsenal
10	FW	Lasse Abildgaard	27 February 2007 (aged 17)	(Royal Dutch Football Association) Ajax
11	FW	Roberto Risnæs	29 January 2007 (aged 17)	(Danish Football Association) Copenhagen
19	FW	Nicolaj Tornvig	30 January 2007 (aged 17)	(Danish Football Association) Midtjylland

=== Wales ===
Head coach: Craig Knight

No.	Pos.	Player	Date of birth (age)	Club
1	GK	Luis Lines	7 July 2007 (aged 16)	(The Football Association) Coventry City
12	GK	Max Hudson	20 September 2007 (aged 16)	(The Football Association) Manchester City
2	DF	Ronan Kpakio	25 May 2007 (aged 16)	(Football Association of Wales) Cardiff City
3	DF	Jac Thomas	9 February 2007 (aged 17)	(Football Association of Wales) Cardiff City
4	DF	Rhys Morrish	4 April 2007 (aged 17)	(The Football Association) West Bromwich Albion
5	DF	Brayden Clarke	3 July 2007 (aged 16)	(The Football Association) Arsenal
6	DF	Iestyn Jones	6 April 2007 (aged 17)	(Football Association of Wales) Swansea City
16	DF	Charlie Walker-Smith	19 September 2007 (aged 16)	(The Football Association) Crystal Palace
17	DF	Zac King-Phillips	26 January 2007 (aged 17)	(The Football Association) Bristol City
8	MF	Makenzie Bradbury	4 August 2007 (aged 16)	(The Football Association) Wolverhampton Wanderers
11	MF	Cruz Allen	25 February 2007 (aged 17)	(The Football Association) Derby County
15	MF	Harlan Perry	28 November 2007 (aged 16)	(Football Association of Wales) Swansea City
18	MF	Charlie Stevens	31 May 2007 (aged 16)	(The Football Association) Bournemouth
19	MF	Jake Davies	10 June 2007 (aged 16)	(Football Association of Wales) Cardiff City
20	MF	Luis Gardner	27 January 2008 (aged 16)	(The Football Association) Everton
7	FW	Oliver Bostock	20 February 2007 (aged 17)	(The Football Association) West Bromwich Albion
9	FW	Adam Brett	20 September 2007 (aged 16)	(The Football Association) Brighton & Hove Albion
10	FW	Elliot Myles	20 January 2007 (aged 17)	(The Football Association) Norwich City
13	FW	Louis Griffiths	3 September 2007 (aged 16)	(The Football Association) Oxford United
14	FW	Henry Kasvosve	9 November 2007 (aged 16)	(The Football Association) Bristol City

== Group C ==
=== Italy ===
Head coach: Massimiliano Favo

No.	Pos.	Player	Date of birth (age)	Club
1	GK	Massimo Pessina	25 December 2007 (aged 16)	(Italian Football Federation) Bologna
12	GK	Alessandro Longoni	31 January 2008 (aged 16)	(Italian Football Federation) AC Milan
2	DF	Emanuel Benjamín	14 July 2007 (aged 16)	(Royal Spanish Football Federation) Real Madrid
3	DF	Cristian Cama	5 June 2007 (aged 16)	(Italian Football Federation) Roma
5	DF	Francesco Verde	21 February 2007 (aged 17)	(Italian Football Federation) Juventus
6	DF	Christian Garofalo	4 January 2007 (aged 17)	(Italian Football Federation) Napoli
13	DF	Lamine Ballo	10 May 2007 (aged 17)	(Italian Football Federation) Inter Milan
15	DF	Andrea Natali	28 January 2008 (aged 16)	(Royal Spanish Football Federation) Barcelona
16	DF	Federico Nardin	18 February 2007 (aged 17)	(Italian Football Federation) Roma
18	DF	Giovanni Lauricella	11 January 2007 (aged 17)	(Italian Football Federation) Empoli
4	MF	Matteo Mantini	27 August 2007 (aged 16)	(Italian Football Federation) Inter Milan
7	MF	Federico Coletta	29 May 2007 (aged 16)	(Italian Football Federation) Roma
8	MF	Alessandro Di Nunzio	21 April 2007 (aged 17)	(Italian Football Federation) Roma
14	MF	Emanuele Sala	28 November 2007 (aged 16)	(Italian Football Federation) AC Milan
17	MF	Matteo Lontani	26 March 2007 (aged 17)	(Italian Football Federation) Juventus
9	FW	Francesco Camarda	10 March 2008 (aged 16)	(Italian Football Federation) AC Milan
10	FW	Mattia Liberali	6 April 2007 (aged 17)	(Italian Football Federation) AC Milan
11	FW	Mattia Mosconi	26 March 2007 (aged 17)	(Italian Football Federation) Inter Milan
19	FW	Thomas Campaniello	29 February 2008 (aged 16)	(Italian Football Federation) Empoli
20	FW	Andrea Orlandi	24 January 2007 (aged 17)	(Italian Football Federation) Empoli

=== Poland ===
Head coach: Rafał Lasocki

No.	Pos.	Player	Date of birth (age)	Club
1	GK	Mateusz Jeleń	2 February 2007 (aged 17)	(Polish Football Association) Górnik Zabrze
22	GK	Mateusz Pruchniewski	15 February 2007 (aged 17)	(Polish Football Association) Lech Poznań
3	DF	Dawid Szwiec	2 August 2007 (aged 16)	(Polish Football Association) Górnik Zabrze
5	DF	Kacper Potulski	19 October 2007 (aged 16)	(German Football Association) Mainz 05
14	DF	Michał Wróblewski	26 February 2007 (aged 17)	(Polish Football Association) Śląsk Wrocław
16	DF	Bartosz Kriegler	29 June 2007 (aged 16)	(Polish Football Association) Górnik Zabrze
17	DF	Dawid Mazurek	30 March 2007 (aged 17)	(Polish Football Association) Górnik Zabrze
20	DF	Wojciech Mońka	18 January 2007 (aged 17)	(Polish Football Association) Lech Poznań
4	MF	Mateusz Dziewiatowski	28 June 2007 (aged 16)	(Polish Football Association) Zagłębie Lubin
7	MF	Mateusz Szczepaniak	5 January 2007 (aged 17)	(Polish Football Association) Legia Warszawa
8	MF	Bartosz Mazurek	3 January 2007 (aged 17)	(Polish Football Association) Jagiellonia Białystok
10	MF	Jakub Adkonis	10 June 2007 (aged 16)	(Polish Football Association) Legia Warszawa
11	MF	Filip Baniowski	15 February 2007 (aged 17)	(Polish Football Association) Wisła Kraków
15	MF	Dominik Sarapata	25 October 2007 (aged 16)	(Polish Football Association) Górnik Zabrze
19	MF	Igor Brzyski	15 March 2007 (aged 17)	(Polish Football Association) Lech Poznań
21	MF	Jan Leszczyński	12 April 2007 (aged 17)	(Polish Football Association) Legia Warszawa
6	FW	Stanisław Gieroba	27 March 2007 (aged 17)	(Polish Football Association) Legia Warszawa
9	FW	Oskar Pietuszewski	20 May 2008 (aged 16)	(Polish Football Association) Jagiellonia Białystok
13	FW	Michael Izunwanne	4 April 2007 (aged 17)	(Austrian Football Association) Austria Wien
18	FW	Kamil Jakóbczyk	23 October 2007 (aged 16)	(Polish Football Association) Lech Poznań

=== Slovakia ===
Head coach: Branislav Fodrek

No.	Pos.	Player	Date of birth (age)	Club
1	GK	Sebastián Zajac	31 October 2007 (aged 16)	(Polish Football Association) Podbeskidzie Bielsko-Biała
12	GK	Dávid Kalanin	17 May 2007 (aged 17)	(Football Association of the Czech Republic) Slavia Prague
2	DF	Martin Turanský	3 June 2007 (aged 16)	(Slovak Football Association) Spartak Trnava
3	DF	Dominik Balog	4 April 2007 (aged 17)	(Slovak Football Association) Slovan Bratislava
4	DF	Martin Hlavatý	27 March 2007 (aged 17)	(Slovak Football Association) Petržalka
5	DF	Tobias Daniel	4 February 2008 (aged 16)	(Slovak Football Association) Spartak Trnava
13	DF	Marek Okál	7 October 2008 (aged 15)	(Slovak Football Association) Žilina
15	DF	Šimon Mišiak	9 March 2007 (aged 17)	(Slovak Football Association) Žilina
6	MF	Kristián Stručka	1 April 2007 (aged 17)	(Slovak Football Association) Žilina
10	MF	Šimon Vlna	11 April 2007 (aged 17)	(Austrian Football Association) AKA Burgenland
11	MF	Filip Trello	28 January 2007 (aged 17)	(Slovak Football Association) Spartak Trnava
14	MF	Daniel Osman	24 August 2007 (aged 16)	(Royal Belgian Football Association) Standard Liège
19	MF	Nathan Udvaros	17 September 2007 (aged 16)	(Slovak Football Association) DAC 1904
20	MF	Martin Bačík	7 March 2007 (aged 17)	(Slovak Football Association) Ružomberok
7	FW	Samuel Lusale	7 September 2007 (aged 16)	(The Football Association) Crystal Palace
8	FW	Dávid Bukovský	27 August 2007 (aged 16)	(Slovak Football Association) Spartak Trnava
9	FW	Denis Valko	13 April 2007 (aged 17)	(Slovak Football Association) DAC 1904
16	FW	Samuel Kováčik	28 May 2007 (aged 16)	(Polish Football Association) Legia Warszawa
17	FW	Lucas Németh	9 May 2007 (aged 17)	(Football Association of the Czech Republic) Slavia Prague
18	FW	Jakub Pira	24 November 2007 (aged 16)	(Football Association of the Czech Republic) Baník Ostrava

=== Sweden ===
Head coach: Roger Franzén

No.	Pos.	Player	Date of birth (age)	Club
1	GK	Elton Fischerström Opancar	2 January 2007 (aged 17)	(Swedish Football Association) Hammarby
12	GK	Nils Ramming	28 March 2007 (aged 17)	(German Football Association) Eintracht Frankfurt
2	DF	Rasmus Nåfors Dahlin	2 April 2007 (aged 17)	(Swedish Football Association) Göteborg
3	DF	Harry Hilvenius	6 October 2007 (aged 16)	(Swedish Football Association) Häcken
4	DF	Ben Magnusson	25 July 2007 (aged 16)	(Swedish Football Association) Göteborg
5	DF	Genesis Antwi	11 May 2007 (aged 17)	(The Football Association) Chelsea
13	DF	Amadeus Sundgren	20 January 2007 (aged 17)	(Swedish Football Association) Malmö
14	DF	Bleon Kurtulus	24 June 2007 (aged 16)	(Swedish Football Association) Halmstad
15	DF	Melvin Vučenović Persson	3 January 2007 (aged 17)	(Swedish Football Association) Djurgården
6	MF	Ossian Nordvall	19 April 2007 (aged 17)	(Swedish Football Association) Brommapojkarna
8	MF	Gjan Ajdin	13 January 2007 (aged 17)	(Swiss Football Association) Basel
9	MF	Åke Andersson	8 May 2007 (aged 17)	(Swedish Football Association) Norrköping
16	MF	Kenan Busuladžić	6 February 2007 (aged 17)	(Swedish Football Association) Malmö
18	MF	Adrian Lahdo	26 December 2007 (aged 16)	(Swedish Football Association) Hammarby
20	MF	Malte Ljungkull	4 June 2007 (aged 16)	(Swedish Football Association) Häcken
7	FW	Linus Järeteg	20 January 2007 (aged 17)	(Swedish Football Association) AIK
10	FW	Neo Jönsson	19 January 2007 (aged 17)	(Danish Football Association) Copenhagen
11	FW	Fred Božičević	28 September 2007 (aged 16)	(Swedish Football Association) Värnamo
17	FW	Andreas Redkin	19 January 2007 (aged 17)	(Swedish Football Association) AIK
19	FW	Nikolaj Staykov	23 February 2007 (aged 17)	(Swedish Football Association) Hammarby

== Group D ==
=== England ===
Head coach: Greg Lincoln

No.	Pos.	Player	Date of birth (age)	Club
1	GK	Spike Brits	24 June 2007 (aged 16)	(The Football Association) Manchester City
13	GK	Oliver Whatmuff	6 November 2007 (aged 16)	(The Football Association) Manchester City
2	DF	Leo Shahar	18 March 2007 (aged 17)	(The Football Association) Newcastle United
3	DF	Christian McFarlane	25 January 2007 (aged 17)	(United States Soccer Federation) New York City
5	DF	Stephen Mfuni	12 February 2008 (aged 16)	(The Football Association) Manchester City
6	DF	Kian Noble	26 February 2007 (aged 17)	(The Football Association) Manchester City
12	DF	Jaden Dixon	7 May 2007 (aged 17)	(The Football Association) Stoke City
16	DF	Samuel Amissah	7 March 2007 (aged 17)	(The Football Association) Fulham
18	DF	Harry Amass	16 March 2007 (aged 17)	(The Football Association) Manchester United
4	MF	Ollie Harrison	7 August 2007 (aged 16)	(The Football Association) Chelsea
7	MF	Jack Fletcher	19 March 2007 (aged 17)	(The Football Association) Manchester United
8	MF	Christopher Rigg	18 June 2007 (aged 16)	(The Football Association) Sunderland
19	MF	Callum Olusesi	11 March 2007 (aged 17)	(The Football Association) Tottenham Hotspur
20	MF	Divine Mukasa	22 August 2007 (aged 16)	(The Football Association) Manchester City
9	FW	Shumaira Mheuka	20 October 2007 (aged 16)	(The Football Association) Chelsea
10	FW	Ethan Nwaneri	21 March 2007 (aged 17)	(The Football Association) Arsenal
11	FW	Mikey Moore	11 August 2007 (aged 16)	(The Football Association) Tottenham Hotspur
14	FW	Baylee Dipepa	12 January 2007 (aged 17)	(The Football Association) Port Vale
15	FW	Luca Fletcher	18 April 2007 (aged 17)	(The Football Association) Manchester City
17	FW	Christian Dunbar-McDonald	29 October 2007 (aged 16)	(The Football Association) Manchester City

=== France ===
Head coach: José Alcocer

No.	Pos.	Player	Date of birth (age)	Club
1	GK	Jules Stawiecki	10 April 2007 (aged 17)	(French Football Federation) Monaco
16	GK	Mathys Niflore	2 March 2007 (aged 17)	(French Football Federation) Toulouse
2	DF	Yaël Thébault	26 February 2007 (aged 17)	(French Football Federation) Rennes
3	DF	Félix Bienck	26 May 2007 (aged 16)	(French Football Federation) Paris FC
4	DF	Mathys Angely	21 April 2007 (aged 17)	(French Football Federation) Bordeaux
5	DF	Joane Gadou (captain)	17 January 2007 (aged 17)	(French Football Federation) Paris Saint-Germain
13	DF	Iliesse Salhi	27 July 2007 (aged 16)	(French Football Federation) Nice
15	DF	Mustapha Sissoko	17 January 2007 (aged 17)	(French Football Federation) Le Havre
20	DF	Idriss Planeix	15 January 2007 (aged 17)	(French Football Federation) Guingamp
6	MF	Pape Cabral	20 January 2007 (aged 17)	(French Football Federation) Monaco
8	MF	Yanis Sellami	4 January 2007 (aged 17)	(French Football Federation) Marseille
17	MF	Darryl Bakola	30 November 2007 (aged 16)	(French Football Federation) Marseille
18	MF	Marius Louër	11 March 2007 (aged 17)	(French Football Federation) Angers
7	FW	Rayane Messi	23 May 2007 (aged 16)	(French Football Federation) Dijon
9	FW	Kylian Kouakou	5 January 2007 (aged 17)	(French Football Federation) Valenciennes
10	FW	Enzo Sternal	28 May 2007 (aged 16)	(French Football Federation) Marseille
11	FW	Ibrahim Yayiya Kanté	18 March 2007 (aged 17)	(French Football Federation) Brest
12	FW	Quentin Ndjantou	23 July 2007 (aged 16)	(French Football Federation) Paris Saint-Germain
14	FW	Mohamed Kader Meïté	11 October 2007 (aged 16)	(French Football Federation) Rennes
19	FW	Enzo Molebe	18 September 2007 (aged 16)	(French Football Federation) Lyon

=== Portugal ===
Head coach: João Santos

No.	Pos.	Player	Date of birth (age)	Club
1	GK	Diogo Ferreira	10 February 2007 (aged 17)	(Portuguese Football Federation) Benfica
12	GK	Miguel Gouveia	12 September 2007 (aged 16)	(Portuguese Football Federation) Sporting CP
2	DF	Duarte Soares	19 February 2007 (aged 17)	(Portuguese Football Federation) Benfica
3	DF	Rui Silva	18 March 2007 (aged 17)	(Portuguese Football Federation) Benfica
4	DF	Rafael Mota	7 February 2007 (aged 17)	(Portuguese Football Federation) Sporting CP
5	DF	Martim Cunha	28 February 2007 (aged 17)	(Portuguese Football Federation) Porto
13	DF	Edgar Mota	8 March 2007 (aged 17)	(Portuguese Football Federation) Braga
14	DF	Afonso Sousa	17 April 2007 (aged 17)	(Portuguese Football Federation) Braga
6	MF	Eduardo Felicíssimo	8 June 2007 (aged 16)	(Portuguese Football Federation) Sporting CP
10	MF	João Simões	6 January 2007 (aged 17)	(Portuguese Football Federation) Sporting CP
15	MF	David Daiber	10 January 2007 (aged 17)	(German Football Association) Bayern Munich
16	MF	Afonso Meireles	19 April 2007 (aged 17)	(Portuguese Football Federation) Vitória de Guimarães
17	MF	Tiago Ferreira	12 January 2007 (aged 17)	(Portuguese Football Federation) Braga
20	MF	Rodrigo Mora	5 May 2007 (aged 17)	(Portuguese Football Federation) Porto
7	FW	Geovany Quenda	30 April 2007 (aged 17)	(Portuguese Football Federation) Sporting CP
8	FW	João Trovisco	23 October 2007 (aged 16)	(Portuguese Football Federation) Braga
9	FW	Gabriel Silva	9 April 2007 (aged 17)	(Portuguese Football Federation) Sporting CP
11	FW	Cardoso Varela	29 October 2008 (aged 15)	(Portuguese Football Federation) Porto
18	FW	Eduardo Fernandes	24 March 2007 (aged 17)	(Portuguese Football Federation) Benfica
19	FW	Afonso Patrão	3 February 2007 (aged 17)	(Portuguese Football Federation) Braga

=== Spain ===
Head coach: Hernán Pérez

No.	Pos.	Player	Date of birth (age)	Club
1	GK	Álvaro González	9 April 2007 (aged 17)	(Royal Spanish Football Federation) Real Madrid
13	GK	Manu González	18 April 2007 (aged 17)	(Royal Spanish Football Federation) Real Betis
2	DF	Jesús Fortea	26 March 2007 (aged 17)	(Royal Spanish Football Federation) Real Madrid
3	DF	Albert Navarro	24 May 2007 (aged 16)	(Royal Spanish Football Federation) Barcelona
4	DF	Joan Martínez	20 August 2007 (aged 16)	(Royal Spanish Football Federation) Real Madrid
5	DF	Andrés Cuenca	22 January 2007 (aged 17)	(Royal Spanish Football Federation) Barcelona
12	DF	Buba Sangaré	6 August 2007 (aged 16)	(Royal Spanish Football Federation) Levante
14	DF	Landry Farré	1 January 2007 (aged 17)	(Royal Spanish Football Federation) Barcelona
15	DF	Diego Aguado	6 February 2007 (aged 17)	(Royal Spanish Football Federation) Real Madrid
6	MF	Marc Bernal	21 May 2007 (aged 16)	(Royal Spanish Football Federation) Barcelona
8	MF	Quim Junyent	25 March 2007 (aged 17)	(Royal Spanish Football Federation) Barcelona
10	MF	Juan Hernández	21 July 2007 (aged 16)	(Royal Spanish Football Federation) Barcelona
18	MF	Pol Durán	8 March 2007 (aged 17)	(Royal Spanish Football Federation) Real Madrid
20	MF	Paulo Iago	10 April 2007 (aged 17)	(Royal Spanish Football Federation) Real Madrid
7	FW	Daniel Yáñez	28 March 2007 (aged 17)	(Royal Spanish Football Federation) Real Madrid
9	FW	Adrián Arnu	4 March 2007 (aged 17)	(Royal Spanish Football Federation) Real Valladolid
11	FW	Igor Oyono	7 February 2007 (aged 17)	(Royal Spanish Football Federation) Athletic Bilbao
16	FW	David Otorbi	16 October 2007 (aged 16)	(Royal Spanish Football Federation) Valencia
17	FW	Guille Fernández	18 June 2008 (aged 15)	(Royal Spanish Football Federation) Barcelona
19	FW	Sydney Osazuwa	21 April 2007 (aged 17)	(Royal Spanish Football Federation) Leganés
