= 2024 UEFA European Under-17 Championship =

2024 Ευρωπαϊκό πρωτάθλημα ποδοσφαίρου Κ-17 2024 Avrupa 17 Yaş Altı Futbol Şampiyonası

Tournament details
- Host country: Cyprus
- Dates: 20 May – 5 June
- Teams: 16 (from 1 confederation)
- Venue: 6 (in 4 host cities)

Final positions
- Champions: Italy (2nd title)
- Runners-up: Portugal

Tournament statistics
- Matches played: 31
- Goals scored: 94 (3.03 per match)
- Attendance: 30,377 (980 per match)
- Top scorer(s): (Portugal) Rodrigo Mora (5 goals)
- Best player: (Italy) Francesco Camarda

The 2024 UEFA European Under-17 Championship (also known as UEFA Under-17 Euro 2024) was the 21st UEFA European Under-17 Championship (40th edition if the Under-16 era is also included), the annual international youth football championship organised by UEFA for the men's under-17 national teams of Europe. Cyprus hosted the tournament. A total of 16 teams played in the tournament, with players born on or after 1 January 2007 eligible to participate.

Germany were the title holders, having beaten France in a penalty shootout in the 2023 final, but were not able to defend their title after failing to qualify for the final tournament.

In the final, Italy defeated Portugal 3–0 to win their second title, winning their first-ever title at this age level and their just second title after the 1982 triumph.

== Host selection ==
- 19 April 2021: Selection of successful host associations by the UEFA Executive Committee at its meeting in Montreux

For the UEFA European Under-17 Championship final tournaments of 2023 and 2024, Hungary and Cyprus were selected as hosts respectively.

== Qualification ==
All 55 UEFA nations entered the competition, and with the hosts Cyprus qualifying automatically, the other 54 teams competed in the qualifying competition, which consisted of two rounds: Qualifying round, which took place in autumn 2023, and Elite round, which took place in spring 2024, to determine the remaining 15 spots in the final tournament.

=== Qualified teams ===
The following teams qualified for the final tournament.

Note: All appearance statistics include only U-17 era (since 2002).

Team	Method of qualification	Appearance	Last appearance	Previous best performance
Cyprus	Hosts	1st	Debut	
France	Elite round Group 1 winners	15th	2023 (Runners-up)	Champions (2004, 2015, 2022)
Sweden	Elite round Group 2 winners	6th	2022 (Group stage)	Semi-finals (2013)
Italy	Elite round Group 3 winners	12th	2023 (Group stage)	Runners-up (2013, 2018, 2019)
Ukraine	Elite round Group 4 winners	7th	2017 (Group stage)	Group stage (2002, 2004, 2007, 2013, 2016, 2017)
Portugal	Elite round Group 5 winners	11th	2023 (Group stage)	Champions (2003, 2016)
Denmark	Elite round Group 6 winners	7th	2022 (Quarter-finals)	Semi-finals (2011)
Austria	Elite round Group 7 winners	7th	2019 (Group stage)	Third place (2003)
Poland	Elite round Group 8 winners	5th	2023 (Semi-finals)	Semi-finals (2012, 2023)
England	Elite round Group 1 runners-up^{1}	16th	2023 (Fifth place)	Champions (2010, 2014)
Wales	Elite round Group 2 runners-up^{1}	2nd	2023 (Group stage)	Group stage (2023)
Slovakia	Elite round Group 4 runners-up^{1}	2nd	2013 (Semi-finals)	Semi-finals (2013)
Croatia	Elite round Group 5 runners-up^{1}	6th	2023 (Group stage)	Fourth place (2005)
Serbia	Elite round Group 6 runners-up^{1}	10th^{2}	2023 (Quarter-finals)	Semi-finals (2022)
Spain	Elite round Group 7 runners-up^{1}	16th	2023 (Semi-finals)	Champions (2007, 2008, 2017)
Czech Republic	Elite round Group 8 runners-up^{1}	7th	2019 (Quarter-finals)	Runners-up (2006)

Notes
^{1} The best seven runners-up among all eight elite round groups qualified for the final tournament.
^{2} Two as Serbia and Montenegro and eight as Serbia

== Venues ==
The tournament was hosted in 6 venues.

Larnaca
Ammochostos Stadium; Capacity: 5,500	AEK Arena – Georgios Karapatakis; Capacity: 7,303	Antonis Papadopoulos Stadium; Capacity: 10,320
2024 UEFA European Under-17 Championship is located in Cyprus
Achna	Limassol	Paralimni
Dasaki Stadium; Capacity: 5,422	Alphamega Stadium; Capacity: 11,000	Paralimni Stadium; Capacity: 5,800

== Officials ==
A total of 12 Referees and 12 Assistant Referees were selected by UEFA for the tournament.

Referee	Assistants
Mohammed Al-Emara (Finland)	Alexis Auger (France)
Menelaos Antoniou (Cyprus)	Nikola Borović (Serbia)
(Bosnia and Herzegovina) Antoni Bandić (Bosnia)	Petar Velizarov Mitrev (Bulgaria)
Ante Čulina (Croatia)	Nelson Filipe Vila Pereira (Portugal)
David Fuxman (Israel)	(Czech Republic) Marek Podaný (Czechia)
Pierre Gaillouste (France)	Luka Pušic (Croatia)
Radoslav Gidzhenov (Bulgaria)	Victor Skytte (Denmark)
Nenad Minaković (Serbia)	Kyriakos Sokratous (Cyprus)
Miguel Bértolo Nogueira (Portugal)	Rostislav Talis (Israel)
(Czech Republic) Jan Petřík (Czechia)	(Bosnia and Herzegovina) Stefan Tešanovic (Bosnia)
Jakob Alexander Sundberg (Denmark)	Martijn Tiesters (Belgium)
Jasper Vergoote (Belgium)	Turkka Valjakka (Finland)

== Group stage ==
The group winners and runners-up advanced to the quarter-finals.

Tie-breaking criteria for group play
The ranking of teams in the group stage was determined as follows:
1. Points obtained in all group matches;
2. Points in head-to-head matches among tied teams;
3. Goal difference in head-to-head matches among tied teams;
4. Goals scored in head-to-head matches among tied teams;
5. If more than two teams were tied, and after applying all head-to-head criteria above, a subset of teams were still tied, all head-to-head criteria above were reapplied exclusively to this subset of teams;
6. Goal difference in all group matches;
7. Goals scored in all group matches;
8. Penalty shoot-out if only two teams had the same number of points, and they met in the last round of the group and were tied after applying all criteria above (not used if more than two teams had the same number of points, or if their rankings were not relevant for qualification for the next stage);
9. Disciplinary points
  - Yellow card: −1 point;
  - Indirect red card (second yellow card): −3 points;
  - Direct red card: −3 points;
10. UEFA coefficient for the qualifying round draw;
11. Drawing of lots.

=== Group A ===
Pos	Team	Pld	W	D	L	GF	GA	GD	Pts	Qualification
1	Czech Republic	3	3	0	0	12	4	+8	9	Knockout stage
2	Serbia	3	2	0	1	7	5	+2	6	Knockout stage
3	Ukraine	3	1	0	2	3	4	−1	3	
4	Cyprus (H)	3	0	0	3	1	10	−9	0	

Source: UEFA
Rules for classification: Group stage tiebreakers
(H) Hosts
20 May 2024
18:00

Serbia	1–0	Ukraine
Makević 2'	Report

Paralimni Stadium, Paralimni
Attendance: 296
Referee: Jakob Alexander Sundberg (Denmark)
20 May 2024
20:30

Cyprus	0–5	Czech Republic
	Report	Kolářík 26'; Naskos 28' (pen.); Nechvátal 40'; Penxa 81'; Kvaček 90+3'

AEK Arena – Georgios Karapatakis, Larnaca
Attendance: 5,435
Referee: Pierre Gaillouste (France)

23 May 2024
18:00

Ukraine	1–3	Czech Republic
Dihtyar 90+5' (pen.)	Report	Moudrý 12' (pen.); Penxa 61', 88'

Paralimni Stadium, Paralimni
Attendance: 315
Referee: Mohammad Al-Emara (Finland)
23 May 2024
20:30

Cyprus	1–3	Serbia
Ioannou 34'	Report	Cvetković 45+3'; Stojanović 53'; Kostov 63'

Antonis Papadopoulos Stadium, Larnaca
Attendance: 1,866
Referee: David Fuxman (Israel)

26 May 2024
20:30

Ukraine	2–0	Cyprus
Bohdanov 30', 48' (pen.)	Report

AEK Arena – Georgios Karapatakis, Larnaca
Attendance: 1,445
Referee: Ante Čulina (Croatia)
26 May 2024
20:30

Czech Republic	4–3	Serbia
Kolářík 8'; Belžík 64' (pen.), 89'; Kolísek 90+3'	Report	Kostov 7'; Kostić 21'; Cvetković 72'

Ammochostos Stadium, Larnaca
Attendance: 271
Referee: Miguel Nogueira (Portugal)

=== Group B ===
Pos	Team	Pld	W	D	L	GF	GA	GD	Pts	Qualification
1	Austria	3	2	1	0	7	0	+7	7	Knockout stage
2	Denmark	3	1	1	1	4	6	−2	4	Knockout stage
3	Croatia	3	0	3	0	3	3	0	3	
4	Wales	3	0	1	2	1	6	−5	1	

Source: UEFA
Rules for classification: Group stage tiebreakers
20 May 2024
18:00

Denmark	2–0	Wales
Obi 45+2'; Johannesen 48'	Report

Dasaki Stadium, Achna
Attendance: 269
Referee: Menelaos Antoniou (Cyprus)
20 May 2024
20:30

Croatia	0–0	Austria
	Report

Antonis Papadopoulos Stadium, Larnaca
Attendance: 258
Referee: Jan Petřík (Czech Republic)

23 May 2024
18:00

Denmark	2–2	Croatia
Abildgaard 36'; Risnæs 60'	Report	Čović 41'; Mikić 47'

Dasaki Stadium, Achna
Attendance: 354
Referee: Jasper Vergoote (Belgium)
23 May 2024
20:30

Austria	3–0	Wales
Hämmerle 30'; Zabransky 51'; Riegel 84'	Report

Ammochostos Stadium, Larnaca
Attendance: 333
Referee: Radoslav Gidzhenov (Bulgaria)

26 May 2024
18:00

Austria	4–0	Denmark
Moizi 11', 29'; Adejenughure 50', 52'	Report

Paralimni Stadium, Paralimni
Attendance: 349
Referee: Antoni Bandić (Bosnia and Herzegovina)
26 May 2024
18:00

Wales	1–1	Croatia
Allen 32'	Report	Durdov 24'

Dasaki Stadium, Achna
Attendance: 229
Referee: Pierre Gaillouste (France)

=== Group C ===
Pos	Team	Pld	W	D	L	GF	GA	GD	Pts	Qualification
1	Italy	3	3	0	0	6	1	+5	9	Knockout stage
2	Poland	3	1	1	1	6	4	+2	4	Knockout stage
3	Sweden	3	0	2	1	3	4	−1	2	
4	Slovakia	3	0	1	2	0	6	−6	1	

Source: UEFA
Rules for classification: Group stage tiebreakers
21 May 2024
18:00

Slovakia	0–0	Sweden
	Report

Paralimni Stadium, Paralimni
Attendance: 303
Referee: Ante Čulina (Croatia)
21 May 2024
20:30

Italy	2–0	Poland
Mosconi 5'; Coletta 72'	Report

AEK Arena – Georgios Karapatakis, Larnaca
Attendance: 350
Referee: Miguel Nogueira (Portugal)

24 May 2024
18:00

Italy	2–0	Slovakia
Camarda 30'; Liberali 38'	Report

Dasaki Stadium, Achna
Attendance: 316
Referee: Jan Petřík (Czech Republic)
24 May 2024
18:00

Sweden	2–2	Poland
Antwi 14'; Bozicevic 55'	Report	Adkonis 24'; Izunwanne 67'

AEK Arena – Georgios Karapatakis, Larnaca
Attendance: 337
Referee: Pierre Gaillouste (France)

27 May 2024
18:00

Sweden	1–2	Italy
Bozicevic 57'	Report	Cama 75'; Camarda 80'

Paralimni Stadium, Paralimni
Attendance: 355
Referee: Nenad Minaković (Serbia)
27 May 2024
18:00

Poland	4–0	Slovakia
Izunwanne 11', 45'; Pietuszewski 30'; Gieroba 68'	Report

Dasaki Stadium, Achna
Attendance: 302
Referee: David Fuxman (Israel)

=== Group D ===
Pos	Team	Pld	W	D	L	GF	GA	GD	Pts	Qualification
1	Portugal	3	2	0	1	7	4	+3	6 (Note: Head-to-head points: Portugal 3, England 3, France 3. Head-to-head goal difference: Portugal +2, England +1, France −3.)	Knockout stage
2	England	3	2	0	1	8	5	+3	6	Knockout stage
3	France	3	2	0	1	3	5	−2	6	
4	Spain	3	0	0	3	2	6	−4	0	

Source: UEFA
Rules for classification: Group stage tiebreakers
Notes:
21 May 2024
18:00

Spain	1–2	Portugal
Yáñez 20'	Report	Varela 25'; Mora 33'

Dasaki Stadium, Achna
Attendance: 446
Referee: Nenad Minaković (Serbia)
21 May 2024
20:30

France	0–4	England
	Report	Moore 2', 39'; Dipepa 34'; Nwaneri 51'

Ammochostos Stadium, Larnaca
Attendance: 1,254
Referee: Antoni Bandić (Bosnia and Herzegovina)

24 May 2024
20:30

France	1–0	Spain
Molebe 86'	Report

Antonis Papadopoulos Stadium, Larnaca
Attendance: 631
Referee: Jakob Alexander Sundberg (Denmark)
24 May 2024
20:30

Portugal	4–1	England
Mora 34', 48'; G. Silva 64'; Patrão 68'	Report	Moore 43'

Ammochostos Stadium, Larnaca
Attendance: 1,184
Referee: Menelaos Antoniou (Cyprus)

27 May 2024
20:30

Portugal	1–2	France
Patrão 38'	Report	Sternal 36'; Molebe 81'

Ammochostos Stadium, Larnaca
Attendance: 496
Referee: Radoslav Gidzhenov (Bulgaria)
27 May 2024
20:30

England	3–1	Spain
Mheuka 6'; Moore 73'; Nwaneri 85'	Report	Arnucio 23'

Antonis Papadopoulos Stadium, Larnaca
Attendance: 1,136
Referee: Jasper Vergoote (Belgium)

== Knockout stage ==
In the knockout stage, a penalty shoot-out was used to decide the winner if necessary (no extra time was played).

=== Bracket ===
Quarter-finals
29 May
Czech Republic	1 (3)
Denmark (p)	1 (5)
30 May
Italy (p)	1 (5)
England	1 (4)
29 May
Austria	2
Serbia	3
30 May
Portugal	2
Poland	1

Semi-finals
2 June
Denmark	0
Italy	1
2 June
Serbia	2
Portugal	3

Final
5 June
Italy	3
Portugal	0

=== Quarter-finals ===
29 May 2024
17:30

Czech Republic	1–1	Denmark
Penxa 71'	Report	Obi 82'
Penalties
Marek Naskos (penalty scored); Sosna (penalty scored); Moudrý (penalty missed); Penxa (penalty scored)	3–5	(penalty scored) Markmann; (penalty scored) Hyseni; (penalty scored) Obi; (penalty scored) Andersen; (penalty scored) Højer

Ammochostos Stadium, Larnaca
Attendance: 298
Referee: Antoni Bandić (Bosnia and Herzegovina)

29 May 2024
20:00

Austria	2–3	Serbia
Adejenughure 1', 79'	Report	Ranković 4', 45+1'; Cvetković 55'

AEK Arena – Georgios Karapatakis, Larnaca
Attendance: 312
Referee: Jakob Alexander Sundberg (Denmark)

30 May 2024
18:00

Portugal	2–1	Poland
Felicíssimo 5'; Mora 59'	Report	Izunwanne 34'

Antonis Papadopoulos Stadium, Larnaca
Attendance: 504
Referee: Jasper Vergoote (Belgium)

30 May 2024
20:30

Italy	1–1	England
Liberali 29'	Report	Nwaneri 16'
Penalties
Lauricella (penalty scored); Natali (penalty scored); Orlandi (penalty scored); Liberali (penalty scored); Camarda (penalty scored)	5–4	(penalty scored) Moore; (penalty missed) Harrison; (penalty scored) Amass; (penalty scored) Nwaneri; (penalty scored) Dipepa

AEK Arena – Georgios Karapatakis, Larnaca
Attendance: 1,619
Referee: Nenad Minaković (Serbia)

=== Semi-finals ===
2 June 2024
18:00

Serbia	2–3	Portugal
Cvetković 22'; Felicíssimo 37' (o.g.)	Report	G. Silva 60'; Mora 89'; Trovisco 90+5'

AEK Arena – Georgios Karapatakis, Larnaca
Attendance: 1,154
Referee: David Fuxman (Israel)

2 June 2024
20:30

Denmark	0–1	Italy
	Report	Coletta 30'

Antonis Papadopoulos Stadium, Larnaca
Attendance: 840
Referee: Antoni Bandić (Bosnia and Herzegovina)

=== Final ===
5 June 2024
20:30

Italy	3–0	Portugal
Coletta 7'; Camarda 16', 50'	Report

Alphamega Stadium, Limassol
Attendance: 7,120
Referee: Radoslav Gidzhenov (Bulgaria)

== Goalscorers ==
There were 94 goals scored in 31 matches, for an average of 3.03 goals per match.

5 goals

- (Portugal) Rodrigo Mora

4 goals

- (Italy) Francesco Camarda
- (Austria) Oghenetejiri Adejenughure
- (Czech Republic) Ondřej Penxa
- (England) Mikey Moore
- (Poland) Michael Izunwanne
- (Serbia) Mihajlo Cvetković

3 goals

- (Italy) Federico Coletta
- (England) Ethan Nwaneri

2 goals

- (Austria) Philipp Moizi
- (Czech Republic) Karel Belžík
- (Czech Republic) Josef Kolářík
- (Denmark) Chido Obi
- (France) Enzo Molebe
- (Italy) Mattia Liberali
- (Portugal) Afonso Patrão
- (Portugal) Gabriel Silva
- (Serbia) Vasilije Kostov
- (Serbia) Đorđe Ranković
- (Sweden) Fred Bozicevic
- (Ukraine) Dmytro Bohdanov

1 goal

- (Austria) Mauro Hämmerle
- (Austria) Adrian Riegel
- (Austria) Valentin Zabransky
- (Croatia) Patrice Čović
- (Croatia) Bruno Durdov
- (Croatia) Noa Mikić
- (Cyprus) Petros Ioannou
- (Czech Republic) Jakub Kolísek
- (Czech Republic) Matěj Kvaček
- (Czech Republic) Lukáš Moudrý
- (Czech Republic) Marek Naskos
- (Czech Republic) Matyáš Nechvátal
- (Denmark) Lasse Abildgaard
- (Denmark) Sofus Johannesen
- (Denmark) Roberto Risnæs
- (England) Baylee Dipepa
- (England) Shumaira Mheuka
- (France) Enzo Sternal
- (Italy) Cristian Cama
- (Italy) Mattia Mosconi
- (Poland) Jakub Adkonis
- (Poland) Stanisław Gieroba
- (Poland) Oskar Pietuszewski
- (Portugal) Eduardo Felicíssimo
- (Portugal) João Trovisco
- (Portugal) Cardoso Varela
- (Serbia) Bogdan Kostić
- (Serbia) Dušan Makević
- (Serbia) Viktor Stojanović
- (Spain) Adrian Arnucio
- (Spain) Daniel Yáñez
- (Sweden) Genesis Antwi
- (Ukraine) Kyrylo Dihtyar
- (Wales) Cruz Allen

1 own goal

- (Portugal) Eduardo Felicíssimo (against Serbia)

== Awards ==
The following awards were given after the conclusion of the tournament:

- Player of the Tournament: (Italy) Francesco Camarda
- Top Scorer: (Portugal) Rodrigo Mora

=== Team of the Tournament ===
After the tournament, the Under-17 Team of the Tournament was selected by the UEFA Technical Observer panel.

Position	Player
Goalkeeper	(Italy) Massimo Pessina
Defenders	(Italy) Emanuel Benjamín
Defenders	(Poland) Kacper Potulski
Defenders	(Denmark) Noah Markmann
Defenders	(Italy) Cristian Cama
Midfielders	(Portugal) Rodrigo Mora
Midfielders	(Serbia) Vasilije Kostov
Midfielders	(Italy) Mattia Liberali
Forwards	(Portugal) Geovany Quenda
Forwards	(Denmark) Chido Obi
Forwards	(Italy) Francesco Camarda
