= Mattia Liberali =

Italian footballer (born 2007)

Personal information
- Date of birth: 6 April 2007 (age 19)
- Place of birth: Carate Brianza, Italy
- Height: 1.72 m (5 ft 8 in)
- Positions: Attacking midfielder; winger

Team information
- Current team: Como
- Number: 30

Youth career
- 2013–2014: Aquile della Brianza
- 2014–2015: La Dominante
- 2015–2025: AC Milan

Senior career*
Years	Team	Apps	(Gls)
2024–2025	Milan Futuro	8	(0)
2024–2025	AC Milan	1	(0)
2025–2026	Catanzaro	29	(4)
2026–	Como	4	(1)

International career^{‡}
2022	Italy U15	6	(4)
2022–2023	Italy U16	10	(3)
2023–2024	Italy U17	28	(6)
2024–2026	Italy U19	20	(6)
2025	Italy U20	4	(0)
2026–	Italy U21	2	(0)
Medal record
Men's football
Representing Italy
UEFA European Under-17 Championship
Winner	2024 Cyprus
- * Club domestic league appearances and goals as of 23:14, 4 November 2026 (UTC) ‡ National team caps and goals as of 5 October 2026

Mattia Liberali (born 6 April 2007) is an Italian professional footballer who plays as an attacking midfielder or winger for Serie A club Como.

== Early life ==
Liberali was born in Carate Brianza, Italy.

== Club career ==
=== AC Milan ===
In 2013, the manager of local amateur side Rhodense, Alberto Bianchi, spotted Liberali and invited him to play in a youth tournament with a view to later sign him. However, he would participate at the tournament with Aquile della Brianza from Muggiò instead, spending a year with the side before joining La Dominante, who he would train during the week with, while playing with professional side AC Milan on weekends.

After a year of this arrangement, Liberali made the switch to AC Milan permanent. During the 2021–22 under-16 Scudetto tournament, he finished second-top scorer behind Francesco Camarda with nine goals, as AC Milan went on to win the competition. He was called up to train with the first team for the first time, alongside Camarda and Nirash Perera, in December 2022. The following year, in July 2023, he signed his first professional contract with the club through 2027.

Liberali joined AC Milan for their 2024–25 pre-season, displaying impressive performances during the friendly matches, including the headlining assist for a 1–0 win against Spanish La Liga club Real Madrid at the Soldier Field in Chicago, Illinois, United States, the club's third friendly match on 31 July 2024. He made his professional debut on 10 August 2024, starting for the newly created reserve team Milan Futuro, and scoring the first goal of a 3–0 away win Coppa Italia Serie C first round match against Lecco.

Liberali made his debut with AC Milan on 15 December 2024, starting on a 0–0 home draw Serie A match against Genoa, simultaneously celebrating the club's 125th anniversary.

He was one of the players that were called up by AC Milan head coach Massimiliano Allegri, for the 2025 AC Milan Asia-Pacific Tour pre-season matches against English Premier League clubs Arsenal and Liverpool, as well as Australian A-League Men club Perth Glory on 23, 26 and 31 July 2025, respectively.

=== Catanzaro ===
On 8 August 2025, Liberali joined Serie B club Catanzaro on a free transfer, signing a contract until 2029.

=== Como ===
On 15 July 2026, he moved to Serie A club Como, permanently for an estimated €6 million transfer fee, ahead of the 2026–27 season. On 18 October he scored his first Serie A goal in the match won 3–1 against Fiorentina.

== International career ==
Liberali has represented Italy at the under-15, under-16, under-17, under-19 and under-20 levels.

With the U17 side he won the 2024 UEFA European Under-17 Championship, and with the U19 side he took part in the 2026 UEFA European Under-19 Championship.

He made is debut with the U21 team on 1 October 2026, in the 2027 Euro qualifying match won 1-0 against Armenia.

Liberali was one of the players who were called up with the Italy national team by head coach Roberto Mancini for the 2026–27 UEFA Nations League matches against France and Belgium on 12 and 15 November 2026, respectively.

== Style of play ==
Initially a central defender while playing at 7-a-side level, Liberali was moved up the pitch in the academy of AC Milan, settling at left-wing, with Italy under-17 coach Massimiliano Favo also utilising him as an attacking midfielder. Former AC Milan defender and current football pundit, Alessandro Costacurta, compared him with English international Phil Foden for their similar playing style.

In October 2024, Liberali was included in The Guardian's list of the 60 best talents in the world born in 2007.

== Career statistics ==
=== Club ===
As of match played 4 November 2026.

Appearances and goals by club, season and competition
Club	Season	League			National cup		Europe		Other		Total	
Club	Season	Division	Apps	Goals	Apps	Goals	Apps	Goals	Apps	Goals	Apps	Goals
Milan Futuro	2024–25	Serie C	8	0	2 (Note: Appearances in Coppa Italia Serie C)	1	—		—		10	1
AC Milan	2024–25	Serie A	1	0	0	0	0	0	—		1	0
Catanzaro	2025–26	Serie B	24	3	1	0	—		5 (Note: Appearances in Serie A promotion play-offs)	1	30	4
Como	2026–27	Serie A	4	1	0	0	2 (Note: Appearances in UEFA Champions League)	1	—		6	2
Career total			42	6	3	1	2	1	5	1	47	7

== Honours ==
Italy U17

- UEFA European Under-17 Championship: 2024

Individual

- UEFA European Under-17 Championship Team of the Tournament: 2024
