= Austria national under-19 football team =

National association football team

Austria U-19
- Association: Austrian Football Association
- Confederation: UEFA (Europe)
- Head coach: (Austria) Martin Scherb
- FIFA code: AUT
| First colours | Second colours |

Biggest win
- Austria 14–0 Gibraltar; 14 November 2019

Biggest defeat
- France 5–0 Austria; 21 July 2010; Spain 5–0 Austria; 26 July 2006

UEFA European Under-19 Championship
- Appearances: 8 (first in 2003)
- Best result: Third place (2003, 2006, 2014)

FIFA U-20 World Cup
- Appearances: 5 (first in 1977)
- Best result: Fourth place (2007)

The Austria national under-19 football team is the national under-19 football team of Austria and is controlled by the Austrian Football Association.

The team competes in the UEFA European Under-19 Championship which is held every year.

== Competition records ==
=== FIFA U-20 World Cup ===
FIFA World Youth Championship/U-20 World Cup record
| Year | Result | Position | Pld | W | D* | L | GF | GA |
|---|---|---|---|---|---|---|---|---|
| (Tunisia) 1977 | Group stage | 15th | 3 | 0 | 1 | 2 | 1 | 6 |
| (Japan) 1979 | did not qualify | | | | | | | |
| (Australia) 1981 | did not qualify | | | | | | | |
| (Mexico) 1983 | Group stage | 16th | 3 | 0 | 0 | 3 | 0 | 10 |
| (Soviet Union) 1985 | did not qualify | | | | | | | |
| (Chile) 1987 | did not qualify | | | | | | | |
| (Saudi Arabia) 1989 | did not qualify | | | | | | | |
| (Portugal) 1991 | did not qualify | | | | | | | |
| (Australia) 1993 | did not qualify | | | | | | | |
| (Qatar) 1995 | did not qualify | | | | | | | |
| (Malaysia) 1997 | did not qualify | | | | | | | |
| (Nigeria) 1999 | did not qualify | | | | | | | |
| (Argentina) 2001 | did not qualify | | | | | | | |
| (United Arab Emirates) 2003 | did not qualify | | | | | | | |
| (Netherlands) 2005 | did not qualify | | | | | | | |
| (Canada) 2007 | Fourth place | 4th | 7 | 3 | 2 | 2 | 6 | 6 |
| (Egypt) 2009 | did not qualify | | | | | | | |
| (Colombia) 2011 | Group stage | 22nd | 3 | 0 | 1 | 2 | 0 | 7 |
| (Turkey) 2013 | did not qualify | | | | | | | |
| (New Zealand) 2015 | Round of 16 | 13th | 4 | 1 | 2 | 1 | 3 | 4 |
| (South Korea) 2017 | did not qualify | | | | | | | |
| (Poland) 2019 | did not qualify | | | | | | | |
| (Indonesia) ~~2021~~ | Cancelled due to the COVID-19 pandemic | | | | | | | |
| (Argentina) 2023 | did not qualify | | | | | | | |
| (Chile) 2025 | did not qualify | | | | | | | |
| (Azerbaijan) (Uzbekistan) 2027 | To be determined | | | | | | | |
| (Armenia) (Georgia (country)) 2029 | To be determined | | | | | | | |
| Total | Fourth place | 5/25 | 20 | 4 | 6 | 10 | 10 | 33 |

*Draws include knockout matches decided on penalty kicks.

=== UEFA European Under-19 Football Championship ===
UEFA European Under-19 Championship record
| Year | Result | Position | Pld | W | D* | L | GF | GA |
|---|---|---|---|---|---|---|---|---|
| (Norway) 2002 | did not qualify | | | | | | | |
| (Liechtenstein) 2003 | Semi-Finals | 3rd | 4 | 2 | 1 | 1 | 10 | 9 |
| (Switzerland) 2004 | did not qualify | | | | | | | |
| (Northern Ireland) 2005 | did not qualify | | | | | | | |
| (Poland) 2006 | Semi-Finals | 3rd | 4 | 2 | 0 | 2 | 6 | 9 |
| (Austria) 2007 | Group stage | 7th | 3 | 0 | 1 | 2 | 1 | 5 |
| (Czech Republic) 2008 | did not qualify | | | | | | | |
| (Ukraine) 2009 | did not qualify | | | | | | | |
| (France) 2010 | Group stage | 6th | 3 | 1 | 0 | 2 | 3 | 8 |
| (Romania) 2011 | did not qualify | | | | | | | |
| (Estonia) 2012 | did not qualify | | | | | | | |
| (Lithuania) 2013 | did not qualify | | | | | | | |
| (Hungary) 2014 | Semi-Finals | 3rd | 4 | 2 | 0 | 2 | 7 | 7 |
| (Greece) 2015 | Group stage | 7th | 3 | 0 | 2 | 1 | 2 | 3 |
| (Germany) 2016 | Group stage | 7th | 3 | 0 | 2 | 1 | 2 | 5 |
| (Georgia (country)) 2017 | did not qualify | | | | | | | |
| (Finland) 2018 | did not qualify | | | | | | | |
| (Armenia) 2019 | did not qualify | | | | | | | |
| (Northern Ireland) ~~2020~~ | Cancelled due to the COVID-19 pandemic | | | | | | | |
| (Romania) ~~2021~~ | Cancelled due to the COVID-19 pandemic | | | | | | | |
| (Slovakia) 2022 | Group stage | 6th | 3 | 1 | 0 | 2 | 5 | 8 |
| (Malta) 2023 | Did not qualify | | | | | | | |
| (Northern Ireland) 2024 | Did not qualify | | | | | | | |
| (Romania) 2025 | Did not qualify | | | | | | | |
| (Wales) 2026 | Did not qualify | | | | | | | |
| (Czech Republic) 2027 | TBD | | | | | | | |
| Total | Semi-Finals | 8/21 | 27 | 8 | 6 | 13 | 36 | 54 |

*Draws include knockout matches decided on penalty kicks.

== Results and fixtures ==
- The following is a list of match results in the last 12 months, as well as any future matches that have been scheduled.

Legend

Win Draw Lose Fixture

== Current squad ==
- The following players were called up for the 2026 UEFA European Under-19 Championship qualification matches.
- Oppositions: Greece, Sweden and Germany
- Match dates: 25, 28 and 31 March 2026
- Caps and goals correct as of: 31 March 2025, after the match against Germany

| No. | Pos. | Player | Date of birth (age) | Caps | Goals | Club |
|---|---|---|---|---|---|---|
| | GK | Christian Zawieschitzky | 2 May 2007 (age 19) | 6 | 0 | (Austrian Football Association) Red Bull Salzburg |
| | GK | Marcel Kurz | 15 March 2007 (age 19) | 1 | 0 | (Austrian Football Association) SKN St. Pölten |
| | DF | Eaden Roka | 3 September 2007 (age 19) | 13 | 0 | (Austrian Football Association) Rapid Wien |
| | DF | Valentin Zabransky | 2 February 2007 (age 19) | 13 | 0 | (Austrian Football Association) FC Liefering |
| | DF | Silvio Zinner | 9 February 2007 (age 19) | 7 | 0 | (Portuguese Football Federation) Braga |
| | DF | Jonas Ilk | 6 April 2007 (age 19) | 4 | 0 | (Austrian Football Association) LASK |
| | DF | Magnus Dalpiaz | 20 February 2007 (age 19) | 8 | 0 | (Italian Football Federation) AC Milan |
| | DF | Oliver Sorg | 31 July 2007 (age 19) | 8 | 0 | (German Football Association) FC Augsburg |
| | DF | Daniel Mahiya | 2 June 2007 (age 19) | 3 | 0 | (Austrian Football Association) Rapid Wien |
| | MF | Philipp Maybach | 14 December 2007 (age 18) | 8 | 1 | (Austrian Football Association) Austria Wien |
| | MF | Romeo Mörth | 2 March 2007 (age 19) | 3 | 0 | (Austrian Football Association) Austria Wien |
| | MF | Ilia Ivanschitz | 7 April 2007 (age 19) | 4 | 1 | (Austrian Football Association) FC Liefering |
| | MF | Ensar Music | 9 September 2007 (age 19) | 7 | 2 | (Austrian Football Association) Rapid Wien |
| | MF | Thomas Schandl | 26 January 2007 (age 19) | 3 | 0 | (Austrian Football Association) Wolfsberger |
| | MF | Yanik Spalt | 3 September 2007 (age 19) | 10 | 1 | (German Football Association) VfB Stuttgart |
| | MF | Florian Hangl | 7 April 2007 (age 19) | 5 | 0 | (German Football Association) FC Augsburg |
| | FW | Oghenetejiri Adejenughure | 4 February 2007 (age 19) | 15 | 6 | (Austrian Football Association) Red Bull Salzburg |
| | FW | Thierry Fidjeu-Tazemeta | 27 July 2007 (age 19) | 3 | 1 | (German Football Association) Borussia Dortmund |
| | FW | Mauro Hämmerle | 17 October 2007 (age 19) | 8 | 6 | (German Football Association) FC Augsburg |
| | FW | Aleksandar Djordjevic | 21 March 2007 (age 19) | 3 | 1 | (Austrian Football Association) Admira Wacker |

== 2022 UEFA European Under-19 Championship ==
=== Qualified teams for the final tournament ===
The following teams qualified for the final tournament of the 2022 UEFA European Under-19 Championship.

Note: All appearance statistics include only U-19 era (since 2002).

| Team | Method of qualification | Appearance | Last appearance | Previous best performance |
|---|---|---|---|---|
| Slovakia | Hosts | 2nd | 2002 | Third place (2002) |
| Romania | Elite round Group 4 winners | 2nd | 2011 | Group Stage (2011) |
| Italy | Elite round Group 5 winners | 8th | 2019 | Champions (2003) |
| Israel | Elite round Group 1 winners | 2nd | 2014 | Group Stage (2014) |
| France | Elite round Group 2 winners | 12th | 2019 | Champions (2005, 2010, 2016) |
| England | Elite round Group 3 winners | 11th | 2018 | Champions (2017) |
| Austria | Elite round Group 7 winners | 8th | 2016 | Semi-finals (2003, 2006, 2014) |
