= Fenin =

Fenin may refer to:

- Fenin-Vilars-Saules, a Swiss municipality
- Yuriy Fenin (born 1977), Ukrainian professional footballer
- Martin Fenin (born 1987), Czech professional footballer
