= Cristian Cama =

Italian footballer (born 2007)

Personal information
- Date of birth: 5 June 2007 (age 19)
- Place of birth: Rome, Italy
- Height: 1.71 m (5 ft 7 in)
- Positions: Left-back; left wing-back

Team information
- Current team: Roma U20
- Number: 22

Youth career
- ASD Romaria
- Roma

International career^{‡}
Years	Team	Apps	(Gls)
2022	Italy U15	3	(0)
2022–2023	Italy U16	17	(1)
2023–2024	Italy U17	16	(1)
2024–2025	Italy U18	6	(0)
2024–	Italy U19	2	(0)
2025–	Italy U20	10	(0)
2026–	Italy U21	1	(0)
Medal record
Men's football
Representing Italy
UEFA European Under-17 Championship
Winner	2024 Cyprus
- ‡ National team caps and goals as of 3 October 2026

Cristian Cama (born 5 June 2007) is an Italian footballer who plays as a left-back and left wing-back for the under-20 (Campionato Primavera 1) team of Serie A club Roma.

== Club career ==
Born in Rome, Cama grew up in Capranica where he played for ASD Romaria before joining the youth academy of Serie A club Roma.

In January 2024, he signed his first professional contract with Roma. Cama signed a new contract in December 2025.

== International career ==
Cama is a youth international for Italy since the under-15.

With the Italian under-17 he was selected for the 2024 European Championship, where he was a key player helping his team win the tournament.

In 2025 he played the Under-20 World Cup with Italy.

== Honours ==
Italy U17

- UEFA European Under-17 Championship: 2024

Individual

- UEFA European Under-17 Championship Team of the Tournament: 2024
