= Andrea Natali =

Italian footballer (born 2008)

Personal information
- Date of birth: 28 January 2008 (age 18)
- Place of birth: Milan, Italy
- Height: 1.87 m (6 ft 2 in)
- Positions: Centre-back; defensive midfielder

Team information
- Current team: AZ
- Number: 20

Youth career
- 2013–2014: Bologna
- 2014–2016: Brera
- 2016–2017: Pont Marina - Almogàvers
- 2017–2018: Cañada Blanch
- 2018–2019: Udinese
- 2019–2020: AC Milan
- 2020–2021: Espanyol
- 2021–2024: Barcelona
- 2024–2025: Bayer Leverkusen
- 2025: → AZ (loan)

Senior career*
| Years | Team | Apps | (Gls) |
| 2025–2026 | Bayer Leverkusen | 0 | (0) |
| 2025–2026 | → Jong AZ (loan) | 11 | (0) |
| 2025–2026 | → AZ (loan) | 0 | (0) |
| 2026– | Jong AZ | 10 | (1) |
| 2026– | AZ | 0 | (0) |

International career^{‡}
| 2022–2023 | Italy U15 | 13 | (0) |
| 2022–2023 | Italy U16 | 4 | (0) |
| 2024 | Italy U17 | 9 | (0) |
| 2024– | Italy U19 | 21 | (0) |
| 2025– | Italy U20 | 5 | (1) |
Medal record
Men's football
Representing Italy
UEFA European Under-17 Championship
| Winner | 2024 Cyprus |
- * Club domestic league appearances and goals as of 23 October 2026 ‡ National team caps and goals as of 11 November 2026

Andrea Natali (born 28 January 2008) is an Italian professional footballer who plays as a centre-back or defensive midfielder for Eredivisie club AZ.

== Early life ==
Natali was born in Milan, Italy and moved to Spain with his family as a child.

== Club career ==
He started playing football at the age of six when he joined the youth academy of Bologna, the club where his father played from 2012 to 2014. In the summer of 2014, he joined Brera and after a few seasons with the Neroverdi, he moved abroad, first to Spain and then to England.

Natali joined the youth academy of La Liga side Barcelona at the age of thirteen, after playing in the youth academy of Udinese and AC Milan's youth academy. He has been described as "one of the most promising defenders in the Blaugrana youth team".

On 26 June 2024, Natali joined Bundesliga club Bayer Leverkusen.

On 4 September 2025, he moved to the Netherlands and joined Eredivisie club AZ on a one-year loan, initially assigned to the under-21 team. On 28 July 2026, he joined AZ on a permanent deal, signing a contract until 2031.

== International career ==
Natali is an Italy youth international, having represented the under-15, under-16, under-17, under-19 and under-20s. He captained the U15s.

With the U17 side he won the 2024 UEFA European Under-17 Championship.

== Style of play ==
Natali mainly operates as a defender and has been described as "stood out for his driving and quality in passing".

== Personal life ==
Natali is the son of Italian former footballer Cesare Natali. He has four siblings.

== Honours ==
Italy U17

- UEFA European Under-17 Championship: 2024

Individual

- UEFA European Under-19 Championship Team of the Tournament: 2026
