= Federico Coletta =

Italian footballer (born 2007)

Personal information
- Date of birth: 29 May 2007 (age 19)
- Place of birth: Rome, Italy
- Height: 1.78 m (5 ft 10 in)
- Positions: Midfielder; winger

Team information
- Current team: Benfica B
- Number: 83

Youth career
- –2016: Vigor Perconti
- 2016–2025: Roma
- 2025–: Benfica

Senior career*
Years	Team	Apps	(Gls)
2025–	Benfica B	5	(0)

International career^{‡}
2022	Italy U15	4	(0)
2023–2024	Italy U17	15	(5)
2024	Italy U18	4	(2)
2024–	Italy U19	20	(2)
2026–	Italy U20	3	(0)
Medal record
Men's football
Representing Italy
UEFA European Under-17 Championship
Winner	2024 Cyprus
- * Club domestic league appearances and goals as of 11 September 2026 ‡ National team caps and goals as of 3 October 2026

Federico Coletta (born 29 May 2007) is an Italian professional footballer who plays as a midfielder and winger for Liga Portugal 2 club Benfica B, the reserve team of Primeira Liga club Benfica.

== Early life ==
Coletta was born on 29 May 2007 in Rome, Italy. Born to Alessandro Coletta and Fabiana Coletta, he is the younger brother of Flavio Coletta.

== Club career ==
As a youth player, Coletta joined the youth academy of Vigor Perconti. In 2016, he joined the youth academy of Serie A side Roma and was promoted to the club's under-20 team in 2024.

On 11 September 2025, Coletta joined Portuguese Primeira Liga side Benfica on a contract until 2028, and was then sent down to the reserve team to get valuable minutes.

== International career ==
Coletta is an Italy youth international and has played for the Italy national under-15 football team, the Italy national under-17 football team, the Italy national under-18 football team, and the Italy national under-19 football team. During the summer of 2024, he helped the Italy national under-17 football team win the 2024 UEFA European Under-17 Championship.

== Style of play ==
Coletta plays as a midfielder and is right-footed. English newspaper The Guardian wrote in 2024 that "his game... resembles that of Lazio’s Davide Frattesi, an agile line-breaker whose instincts and timing make him a menace attacking the penalty box".

== Career statistics ==
=== Club ===
As of match played 14 March 2026

Appearances and goals by club, season and competition
Club	Season	League			Cup		Europe		Other		Total	
Club	Season	Division	Apps	Goals	Apps	Goals	Apps	Goals	Apps	Goals	Apps	Goals
Benfica B	2025–26	Liga Portugal 2	3	0	—		—		3 (Note: Appearances in Premier League International Cup)	1	6	1
Career total			3	0	0	0	0	0	3	1	6	1

== Honours ==
Italy U17

- UEFA European Under-17 Championship: 2024
