= Filip Kalanin =

Slovak footballer (born 2009)

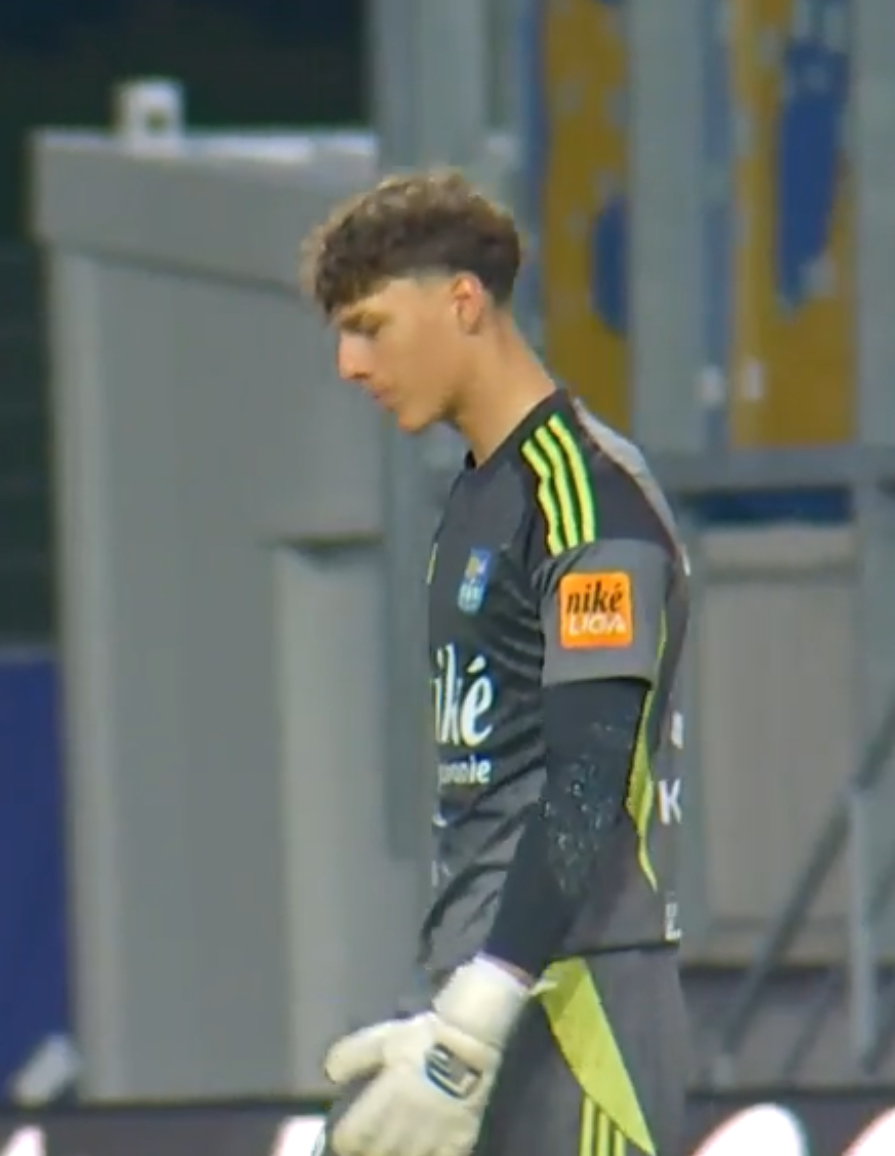
- Kalanin on his debut

Personal information
- Date of birth: 30 August 2009 (age 17)
- Place of birth: Ťahanovce, Slovakia
- Position: Goalkeeper

Team information
- Current team: FC Košice
- Number: 32

Youth career
- –2025: FC Košice

Senior career*
| Years | Team | Apps | (Gls) |
| 2025– | FC Košice | 2 | (0) |

International career^{‡}
| 2024 | Slovakia U15 | 2 | (0) |
| 2024 | Slovakia U16 | 1 | (0) |
| 2025– | Slovakia U17 | 0 | (0) |
- * Club domestic league appearances and goals as of 12 March 2026 ‡ National team caps and goals as of 12 March 2026

Filip Kalanin (born 30 August 2009) is a Slovak professional football player who currently plays for Slovak First Football League club FC Košice, as a goalkeeper. He also represents the Slovakia national under-17 football team.

Kalanin is the all time youngest player to start a match in the Slovak First Football League.

== Club career ==
=== FC Košice ===
==== 2025–26 season: Debut season ====
On 21 October 2025, Kalanin signed his first professional contract with FC Košice, signing a 3-year contract until the year 2028. He had previously been playing for Košice’s B team in the 3. Liga. Two days later, Kalanin made his debut for the club in the fourth round of the 2025–26 Slovak Cup in a 4–2 win over ViOn Zlaté Moravce, saving a penalty to keep the game at 2–2. He was praised by the Košice manager František Straka for his performance.

Kalanin made his Slovak First Football League debut in a 2–0 loss against AS Trenčín, becoming the youngest player to start a game in the league at 16 years, 2 months and 9 days, breaking the previous record of Artur Gajdoš from AS Trenčín. His next game would come in a 2–1 loss to FC Spartak Trnava. Kalanin was rated as the best player on the pitch for Košice, saving a penalty but eventually conceding a goal in the 94th minute of the game.

== International career ==
In early 2025 he played for the U16 side. On 19 August 2025, Kalanin received his first nomination for the Slovakia national under-17 football team ahead of two preparation matches against the Lithuania national under-17 football team. A month later, he was nominated as a first team player against Slovenia, where he kept a clean sheet in a 0–0 draw.

== Style of play ==
Kalanin is noted for his reflexes and work rate. He has been compared to Italian goalkeeper Gianluigi Donnarumma.

== Personal life ==
Kalanin has a brother called Dávid who is also a goalkeeper. In August 2025, he signed a professional contract with SK Slavia Prague. Dávid currently played for 2. Liga club FC ViOn Zlaté Moravce on loan from Slavia.

== Career statistics ==
| Club | Season | League | | Cup | | Other | |
| Club | Season | Apps | Goals | Apps | Goals | Apps | Goals |
|---|---|---|---|---|---|---|---|
| FC Košice | 2025–26 | 2 | 0 | 2 | 0 | – | |
