= RCD Mallorca B =

Association football club

Mallorca B
- Full name: Real Club Deportivo Mallorca, S.A.D. "B"
- Founded: 1967 (as UD Collerense)
- Ground: Estadi i Son Bibiloni, Palma, Balearic Islands, Spain
- Capacity: 1,500
- President: Monti Galmés
- Head coach: Gustavo Siviero
- League: Segunda Federación – Group 3
- 2025–26: Tercera Federación – Group 11, 1st of 18 (champions)
Home colours	Away colours	Third colours

Real Club Deportivo Mallorca B is a Spanish football team based in Palma, Majorca, in the Balearic Islands. Founded in 1967, it is the reserve team of RCD Mallorca and currently plays in Segunda Federación – Group 3, holding home matches at Estadi i Son Bibiloni, with a capacity of 1,500 seats.

Unlike in England, reserve teams in Spain play in the same football pyramid as their senior team rather than a separate league.

== History ==
=== Background ===
- As farm team:
  - Mallorca Atlético - (1983–93)
- As reserve team:
  - RCD Mallorca "B" - (1993–)

=== Other farm clubs ===
- Atlético de Palma - (1961–65)
- CF Palma - (1965–72)
- UD Collerense - (1981–83)

== Season to season ==
- UD Collerense (farm team in 1981–82 and 1982–83)

Season	Tier	Division	Place	Copa del Rey
1967–68	5	2ª Reg.		
1968–69	4	1ª Reg.	1st	
1969–70	4	1ª Reg.	2nd	
1970–71	4	1ª Reg.	1st	
1971–72	4	1ª Reg.	4th	
1972–73	4	Reg. Pref.	5th	
1973–74	4	Reg. Pref.	10th	
1974–75	4	Reg. Pref.	18th	

Season	Tier	Division	Place	Copa del Rey
1975–76	5	1ª Reg.	7th	
1976–77	5	1ª Reg.	1st	
1977–78	5	Reg. Pref.	8th	
1978–79	5	Reg. Pref.	5th	
1979–80	4	3ª	15th	
1980–81	4	3ª	12th	
1981–82	4	3ª	12th	
1982–83	4	3ª	14th	

- Mallorca Atlético, farm team

Season	Tier	Division	Place	Copa del Rey
1983–84	4	3ª	7th	
1984–85	4	3ª	1st	
1985–86	4	3ª	1st	
1986–87	3	2ª B	21st	
1987–88	4	3ª	4th	
1988–89	4	3ª	1st	
1989–90	3	2ª B	14th	
1990–91	3	2ª B	17th	
1991–92	4	3ª	4th	
1992–93	4	3ª	3rd	

- Mallorca B, reserve team

Season	Tier	Division	Place
1993–94	4	3ª	1st
1994–95	4	3ª	1st
1995–96	3	2ª B	14th
1996–97	3	2ª B	11th
1997–98	3	2ª B	3rd
1998–99	2	2ª	19th
1999–2000	3	2ª B	5th
2000–01	3	2ª B	7th
2001–02	3	2ª B	15th
2002–03	3	2ª B	14th
2003–04	3	2ª B	14th
2004–05	3	2ª B	18th
2005–06	4	3ª	2nd
2006–07	4	3ª	2nd
2007–08	4	3ª	2nd
2008–09	4	3ª	1st
2009–10	3	2ª B	8th
2010–11	3	2ª B	19th
2011–12	3	2ª B	12th
2012–13	3	2ª B	18th
2013–14	4	3ª	1st

Season	Tier	Division	Place
2014–15	3	2ª B	17th
2015–16	4	3ª	1st
2016–17	3	2ª B	13th
2017–18	4	3ª	1st
2018–19	4	3ª	2nd
2019–20	4	3ª	3rd
2020–21	4	3ª	4th / 1st
2021–22	5	3ª RFEF	1st
2022–23	4	2ª Fed.	17th
2023–24	5	3ª Fed.	2nd
2024–25	4	2ª Fed.	17th
2025–26	5	3ª Fed.	1st
2026–27	4	2ª Fed.	

- 1 season in Segunda División
- 18 seasons in Segunda División B
- 3 seasons in Segunda Federación
- 23 seasons in Tercera División
- 3 seasons in Tercera Federación/Tercera División RFEF

== Honours ==
- Tercera División
  - Champions (9): 1984–85, 1985–86, 1988–89, 1993–94, 1994–95, 2008–09, 2013–14, 2015–16, 2017–18
- Copa Federación
  - Winners (1): 1995–96

== Current squad ==
As of 18 November 2026.

Note: Flags indicate national team as defined under FIFA eligibility rules; some limited exceptions apply. Players may hold more than one non-FIFA nationality.

No.	Pos.	Nation	Player
1	GK	ESP	Toni Dols
2	DF	ESP	Miguel Calatayud
3	DF	ESP	Jordi Porras
4	DF	CUB	Leo Lucas
5	DF	FRA	Iliesse Salhi
6	DF	ESP	Samuel Guzmán
7	MF	ARG	Marcos Gorriti
8	MF	ESP	Jandro García
9	FW	ECU	Wilber Hurtado
10	MF	ESP	Cesc Riba
11	DF	ESP	Miquel Jaume
12	DF	ESP	Jan Buyreu
13	GK	ESP	Nil Torreguitart

No.	Pos.	Nation	Player
14	MF	ESP	David Ortega
16	DF	GBS	Iago Mendes
17	FW	ESP	Pol Montesinos
18	DF	MAR	Saifdine Chlaghmo
19	FW	ESP	Aimar Peña
20	MF	ESP	Alejandro Yerga
21	DF	ESP	Fran Tafalla
22	MF	ESP	Iker Adelantado
23	DF	ESP	Luis Orejuela
24	MF	ESP	Biel Serra
25	GK	ESP	Marc Gómez
27	MF	GUI	Abdourahamane Diallo

=== From Youth Academy ===
Note: Flags indicate national team as defined under FIFA eligibility rules; some limited exceptions apply. Players may hold more than one non-FIFA nationality.

No.	Pos.	Nation	Player
26	MF	ESP	Sergi Fernández
28	DF	POR	Spencer D'Vaz
29	FW	ESP	Lluis Quirós

No.	Pos.	Nation	Player
30	FW	GRE	Anastasios Sidiropoulos
31	GK	ESP	Marc Gómez
