= Dávid Kalanin =

Slovak footballer (born 2007)

Personal information
- Date of birth: 17 May 2007 (age 19)
- Place of birth: Košice, Slovakia
- Height: 1.94 m (6 ft 4 in)
- Position: Goalkeeper

Team information
- Current team: Zlaté Moravce (on loan from Slavia Prague)
- Number: 1

Youth career
- –2024: FC Košice
- 2024–: Slavia Prague

Senior career*
| Years | Team | Apps | (Gls) |
| 2026– | → Zlaté Moravce (loan) | 7 | (0) |

International career^{‡}
| 2023–2024 | Slovakia U17 | 2 | (0) |
| 2024–2025 | Slovakia U18 | 4 | (0) |
| 2025– | Slovakia U19 | 3 | (0) |
- * Club domestic league appearances and goals as of 25 May 2026 ‡ National team caps and goals as of 09:59, 15 May 2026 (UTC)

Dávid Kalanin (born 17 May 2007) is a Slovak professional footballer who plays as a goalkeeper for 2. Liga club FC ViOn Zlaté Moravce, on loan from Slavia Prague. He is the brother of Filip Kalanin.

== Club career ==
=== Slavia Prague ===
In 2024, Kalanin left the academy of Slovak club FC Košice to join the youth side of Czech club Slavia Prague. In the 2023–24 season, he helped Slavia win the under-17 championship title and the U17 Czech-Slovak Cup, when they succeeded in the final against Spartak Trnava. In the 2025–26 season, Kalanin played for the U20 category in the Bohemian Football League, the third level of football in the Czech Republic. Later that season, he signed his first professional contract, keeping him at the club until 2028. He played three matches for Slavia Prague in the UEFA Youth League, playing in 2–2 a draw against Inter Milan, a 5–1 win against English club Arsenal, and a 3–3 draw against Athletic Bilbao.

=== Zlaté Moravce (loan) ===
On 14 January 2026, it was announced that Kalanin would be returning to Slovakia to join 2. Liga club FC ViOn Zlaté Moravce on a half-year contract. He made his debut for Zlate Moravce in a 2–1 winter friendly loss against MFK Skalica. His professional debut came on 1 March 2026, playing in a 3–1 win against Slávia TU Košice in the 18th round of the league.

== International career ==
As a 16-year-old, Kalanin made his international debut for the Slovakia under-17s, playing a friendly match against Lithuania in Senec. In 2024, he was selected by the head coach of the Slovakia under-17 team, Branislav Fodrek, to be a part of the squad ahead of the 2024 UEFA European Under-17 Championship in Cyprus. In the first game against Sweden, he would only feature on the bench in a 0–0 draw.

== Personal life ==
Kalanin has a brother, Filip Kalanin who currently plays for FC Košice. Filip became the youngest player to start a game in the Slovak League after a 2–0 loss against AS Trenčín.
