= Eduardo Felicíssimo =

Portuguese footballer (born 2007)

Personal information
- Full name: Eduardo Manuel de Freitas Monteiro Ferreira Felicíssimo
- Date of birth: 8 January 2007 (age 19)
- Place of birth: Montijo, Portugal
- Height: 1.87 m (6 ft 2 in)
- Position: Defensive midfielder

Team information
- Current team: Sporting CP B
- Number: 73

Youth career
- 2012–2013: Alcochetense
- 2013–2019: Benfica
- 2019–2024: Sporting CP

Senior career*
Years	Team	Apps	(Gls)
2024–	Sporting CP B	46	(0)
2025–	Sporting CP	7	(0)

International career^{‡}
2023	Portugal U16	8	(0)
2023–2024	Portugal U17	18	(2)
2025–	Portugal U18	4	(2)
2024–	Portugal U19	20	(2)
- * Club domestic league appearances and goals as of 20 June 2026 ‡ National team caps and goals as of 00:38, 2 December 2025 (UTC)

Eduardo Manuel de Freitas Monteiro Ferreira Felicíssimo (born 8 January 2007) is a Portuguese professional footballer who plays as a defensive midfielder for Liga Portugal 2 club Sporting CP B.

== Career ==
A youth product of Alcochetense and Benfica, Felicíssimo moved to the youth academy of Sporting CP in 2019 where he finished his development. On 6 April 2023, he signed his first professional contract with Sporting. He started the 2024–25 season with Sporting's reserves, but was promoted to their senior team in January 2025. He made his senior debut with Sporting as a substitute in a 2–2 Primeira Liga tie with AVS on 23 February 2025.

On 29 December 2025, Felicíssimo extended his contract with Sporting CP until June 2030.

== International career ==
Felicíssimo is a youth international for Portugal, and was part of the Portugal U17s that made the finals at the 2024 UEFA European Under-17 Championship.

== Playing style ==
Felicíssimo is a defensive midfielder who is noted for his tactics and positioning. He is adept at both long and short-passing, and is often active in the centre of the pitch. He is known for carrying the ball forward to start plays.

== Career statistics ==
=== Club ===
As of match played 7 April 2025

Appearances and goals by club, season and competition
Club	Season	League			National cup		League cup		Europe		Other		Total	
Club	Season	Division	Apps	Goals	Apps	Goals	Apps	Goals	Apps	Goals	Apps	Goals	Apps	Goals
Sporting CP B	2024–25	Liga 3	20	0	—		—		—		—		20	0
Sporting CP	2024–25	Primeira Liga	6	0	1	0	—		—		—		7	0
Career total			26	0	1	0	0	0	0	0	0	0	27	0

== Honours ==
Sporting CP

- Primeira Liga: 2024–25
- Taça de Portugal: 2024–25
