= Iliesse Salhi =

French footballer

Personal information
- Full name: Iliesse Salhi
- Date of birth: 27 July 2007 (age 19)
- Place of birth: Aubervilliers, France
- Height: 1.72 m (5 ft 8 in)
- Position: Left-back

Team information
- Current team: Mallorca B
- Number: 26

Youth career
- INF Clairefontaine
- 2013–2016: Étoile Bobigny
- 2016–2022: Bobigny
- 2022–2025: Nice

Senior career*
Years	Team	Apps	(Gls)
2024–2025	Nice	0	(0)
2025–	Mallorca B	8	(0)
2025–	Mallorca	0	(0)

International career^{‡}
2023	Morocco U16	5	(0)
2024	France U17	8	(1)
2024–	France U18	12	(1)
2025–	France U19	1	(0)
- * Club domestic league appearances and goals as of 1 February 2026 ‡ National team caps and goals as of 5 September 2025

Iliesse Salhi (Arabic: إلياس صالحي; born 27 July 2007) is a French professional footballer who plays as a left-back for Spanish club RCD Mallorca B.

== Club career ==
=== Nice ===
Born in Aubervilliers, Salhi joined Étoile Bobigny in 2013 from INF Clairefontaine, and moved to AF Bobigny in 2016. On 26 February 2020, he agreed to a contract with OGC Nice, but only joined the club in 2022.

After progressing through the youth setup, Salhi made his first team debut for Nice on 28 November 2024, coming on as a second-half substitute for Issiaga Camara in a 4–1 home loss to Rangers, for the 2024–25 UEFA Europa League group stage.

=== Mallorca ===
In July 2025, Salhi moved abroad and signed for La Liga side RCD Mallorca, after his contract with Nice expired. Initially a member of the B-team in Tercera Federación, he spent the pre-season with the main squad.

== International career ==
Born in France, Salhi is of Moroccan descent, and is eligible to play for both countries. After playing for the Morocco under-16 team, he subsequently represented France at under-17 and under-18 levels.

== Career statistics ==
As of match played 16 December 2025

Appearances and goals by club, season and competition
Club	Season	League			Cup		Europe		Total	
Club	Season	Division	Apps	Goals	Apps	Goals	Apps	Goals	Apps	Goals
Nice	2024–25	Ligue 1	0	0	0	0	1 (Note: Appearance in UEFA Europa League)	0	1	0
Mallorca	2025–26	La Liga	0	0	2	0	—		2	0
Career total			0	0	2	0	1	0	3	0
