= Noah Markmann =

Danish footballer (born 2007)

Personal information
- Full name: Noah Hesselund Markmann
- Date of birth: 24 February 2007 (age 19)
- Place of birth: Hørsholm, Denmark
- Height: 1.89 m (6 ft 2 in)
- Position: Centre-back

Team information
- Current team: Nordsjælland
- Number: 45

Youth career
- Nordsjælland

Senior career*
Years	Team	Apps	(Gls)
2024–	Nordsjælland	42	(0)

International career^{‡}
2022–2023	Denmark U16	10	(0)
2023–2024	Denmark U17	18	(1)
2024–2025	Denmark U18	6	(0)
2025–2026	Denmark U19	3	(0)
2025–	Denmark U21	2	(0)
2026–	Denmark U20	2	(0)
- * Club domestic league appearances and goals as of 18 October 2026 ‡ National team caps and goals as of 20:25, 4 October 2026 (UTC)

Noah Hesselund Markmann (born 24 February 2007) is a Danish footballer who plays as a centre-back for Danish Superliga club FC Nordsjælland.

== Club career ==
=== FC Nordsjælland ===
Markmann joined FC Nordsjælland as an U11 player.

On 23 July 2024, 17-year-old Markmann extended his contract until June 2027 and was also permanently promoted to the first team squad. It happened in the wake of Markmann having recently attended a training camp with the first team.

On 25 September 2024 Markmann made his debut for Nordsjælland in a Danish Cup match against Fremad Amager. His debut in the Danish Superliga came on 23 February 2025 when Marmann replaced Erik Marxen in the 81st minute against Sønderjyske.

== Career statistics ==
As of match played 18 October 2026

Appearances and goals by club, season and competition
Club	Season	League			Cup		Europe		Other		Total	
Club	Season	Division	Apps	Goals	Apps	Goals	Apps	Goals	Apps	Goals	Apps	Goals
Nordsjælland	2024–25	Danish Superliga	10	0	1	0	—		—		11	0
Nordsjælland	2025–26	Danish Superliga	24	0	3	0	—		—		27	0
Nordsjælland	2026–27	Danish Superliga	8	0	1	0	3 (Note: Appearances in UEFA Conference League)	0	—		12	0
Career total			42	0	5	0	3	0	0	0	50	0

== Honours ==
Individual

- UEFA European Under-17 Championship Team of the Tournament: 2024
