= Enzo Molebe =

French footballer (born 2007)

Personal information
- Full name: Enzo Anthony Honoré Molebe
- Date of birth: 18 September 2007 (age 19)
- Place of birth: Décines-Charpieu, France
- Height: 1.78 m (5 ft 10 in)
- Position: Forward

Team information
- Current team: Lausanne-Sport (on loan from Lyon)
- Number: 9

Youth career
- 2012–2015: RC Arpajonnais
- 2015–2019: Paris FC
- 2019–2020: Boulogne-Billancourt
- 2020–: Lyon

Senior career*
Years	Team	Apps	(Gls)
2024–	Lyon B	17	(5)
2024–	Lyon	1	(0)
2026	→ Montpellier (loan)	12	(2)
2026–	→ Lausanne-Sport (loan)	10	(2)

International career^{‡}
2023	France U16	10	(9)
2024	France U17	3	(2)
2024–2025	France U18	8	(3)
2025–2026	France U19	10	(6)
2026–	France U20	4	(1)
- * Club domestic league appearances and goals as of 7 November 2026 ‡ National team caps and goals as of 15 November 2026

Enzo Molebe, 2025

Enzo Anthony Honoré Molebe (born 18 September 2007) is a French professional footballer who plays as a forward for Swiss Super League club Lausanne-Sport, on loan from Ligue 1 club Lyon.

In 2024, Molebe was named by English newspaper The Guardian as one of the best players born in 2007 worldwide.

== Early career ==
Born in Décines-Charpieu, Molebe moved to the Île-de-France region with his family at a young age. He started his youth career playing for local club RC Arpajonnais before joining the youth academy of Paris FC, and then Boulogne-Billancourt. In 2020, he signed for Lyon youth academy.

== Club career ==
On 5 June 2024, Molebe signed his first professional contract with Lyon, for three seasons, until 30 June 2027. On 28 November 2024, he made his first team debut, coming on as a late-game substitute for Malick Fofana in a 4–1 away win over Qarabağ, as part of the 2024–25 UEFA Europa League league phase.

On 2 February 2026, Molebe was loaned by Montpellier. On 6 March 2026, he scored his first goal for the team in a 3–0 away Ligue 2 win against Nancy.

== International career ==
Born in France, Molebe is of Congolese descent. He has represented France internationally at youth levels, having played for the under-16s and under-17s. In May 2024, he was selected in France U17's squad for the Euro U17. He scored the only goal in France's 1–0 victory against Spain. Then in the last group stage game against Portugal, he scored the winning goal to help France grab their second victory at the tournament.

== Career statistics ==
As of match played 7 November 2026

Appearances and goals by club, season and competition
Club	Season	League			National cup		Europe		Other		Total	
Club	Season	Division	Apps	Goals	Apps	Goals	Apps	Goals	Apps	Goals	Apps	Goals
Lyon B	2024–25	National 3	9	1	—		—		4 (Note: Appearance(s) in Premier League International Cup)	1	13	2
Lyon B	2025–26	National 3	8	4	—		—		—		8	4
Lyon B	Total		17	5	—		—		4	1	21	6
Lyon	2024–25	Ligue 1	0	0	1	0	1 (Note: Appearances in UEFA Europa League)	0	—		2	0
Lyon	2025–26	Ligue 1	1	0	0	0	2	0	—		3	0
Lyon	2026–27	Ligue 1	0	0	0	0	0	0	—		0	0
Lyon	Total		1	0	1	0	3	0	0	0	5	0
Montpellier (loan)	2025–26	Ligue 2	12	2	—		—		—		12	2
Lausanne-Sport (loan)	2026–27	Swiss Super League	10	2	2	4	—		—		12	6
Career total			40	9	3	4	3	0	4	1	50	14
