= Afonso Patrão =

Portuguese footballer (born 2007)

Personal information
- Full name: Afonso Cruz Patrão
- Date of birth: February 3, 2007 (age 19)
- Place of birth: Esposende, Portugal
- Height: 1.82 m (6 ft 0 in)
- Position: Forward

Team information
- Current team: Pafos
- Number: 17

Youth career
- 2011–2014: Marinhas
- 2014–2019: Casa Benfica
- 2019–2020: Braga
- 2020–2021: Palmeiras
- 2021–2024: Braga

Senior career*
Years	Team	Apps	(Gls)
2024–2026	Braga B	17	(1)
2025–2026	Braga	7	(1)
2026	Westerlo	11	(1)
2026–	Pafos	1	(0)

International career^{‡}
2022	Portugal U15	4	(0)
2022–2023	Portugal U16	10	(1)
2023–2024	Portugal U17	20	(6)
2024–2025	Portugal U18	15	(7)
2025–	Portugal U19	5	(2)
- * Club domestic league appearances and goals as of 6 September 2026 ‡ National team caps and goals as of 01:34, 29 January 2026 (UTC)

Afonso Cruz Patrão (born 3 February 2007) is a Portuguese professional footballer who plays as a forward for Cypriot First Division club Pafos.

== Club career ==
Born in Esposende, Patrão signed his first professional contract with Braga on 20 June 2023.

On 22 February 2025, he debuted for Braga B in a 1–0 win away against Länk Vilaverdense in Liga 3, contributing an assist. He made his first-team debut on 8 March 2025, coming on late in a 1–0 home victory over Porto.

Patrão scored his first Primeira Liga goal on 7 April 2025, heading in the 87th-minute equaliser in a 1–1 draw away with Sporting CP at the Estádio José Alvalade.

On 28 January 2026, Patrão moved to Belgium, joining Pro League club Westerlo on a contract until June 2030, for a fee of €220.000.

On 4 September 2026, Patrão signed a four-year contract with Cypriot First Division club Pafos.

== International career ==
Patrão was named in Portugal’s final squad for the 2024 UEFA European Under-17 Championship and helped the team reach the final of the tournament.

== Style of play ==
A centre-forward noted for movement in the box and finishing, Patrão was described by a former Braga youth coach as a player who “always lived for goals”.

== Career statistics ==
As of match played 7 September 2026

Appearances and goals by club, season and competition
Club	Season	League			National cup		League cup		Europe		Total	
Club	Season	Division	Apps	Goals	Apps	Goals	Apps	Goals	Apps	Goals	Apps	Goals
Braga B	2024–25	Liga 3	4	0	—		—		—		4	0
Braga B	2025–26	Liga 3	14	1	—		—		—		14	1
Braga B	Total		18	1	—		—		—		18	1
Braga	2024–25	Primeira Liga	7	1	0	0	0	0	0	0	7	1
Westerlo	2025–26	Belgian Pro League	11	1	—		—		—		11	1
Pafos	2026–27	Cypriot First Division	1	0	0	0	0	0	1 (Note: Appearance in Cypriot Super Cup)	0	2	0
Career total			37	3	0	0	0	0	1	0	38	3

== Honours ==
Portugal U17

- UEFA European Under-17 Championship runner-up: 2024
