= Yuriy Fenin =

Ukrainian footballer

Personal information
- Date of birth: 28 March 1977 (age 49)
- Place of birth: Bilozerka, Ukrainian SSR
- Position: Forward

Senior career*
Years	Team	Apps	(Gls)
1992–1994	Tavriya Simferopol	8	(0)
1994–1995	Meliorator Kakhovka	24	(2)
1995	Tavriya Simferopol	5	(0)
1996	Constructorul Chișinău	10	(2)
1997	CSA Victoria Cahul	7	(1)
1998	Torpedo-Kadino Mogilev	10	(1)
1999–2000	Vedrich-97 Rechitsa	26	(9)
2000–2001	Levadia Maardu	34	(13)
2001–2002	Levadia Pärnu	21	(6)
2002–2003	Levadia Tallinn	24	(9)
2005	Pakri SK	13	(8)
2006–2009	Maardu Esteve	55	(31)
2010	Keskerakonna JK	13	(7)
2011–2014	MC Tallinn	58	(10)
2015	Maardu United		
- * Club domestic league appearances and goals as of 31 December 2015

Yuriy Fenin (born 28 March 1977) is a Ukrainian professional football forward who most recently played for various clubs in Estonian lower leagues.

== Career ==
Fenin began his playing career with SC Tavriya Simferopol in the Ukrainian Premier League. He held the record in Ukraine for being the youngest professional player of the Ukrainian Premier League when at the age of 15 years and 221 days played for Tavriya Simferopol against FC Zorya-MALS Luhansk, before the record was beaten by Kyrylo Dihtyar from Metalist Kharkiv in 2023.
