= Oghenetejiri Adejenughure =

Austrian footballer (born 2007)

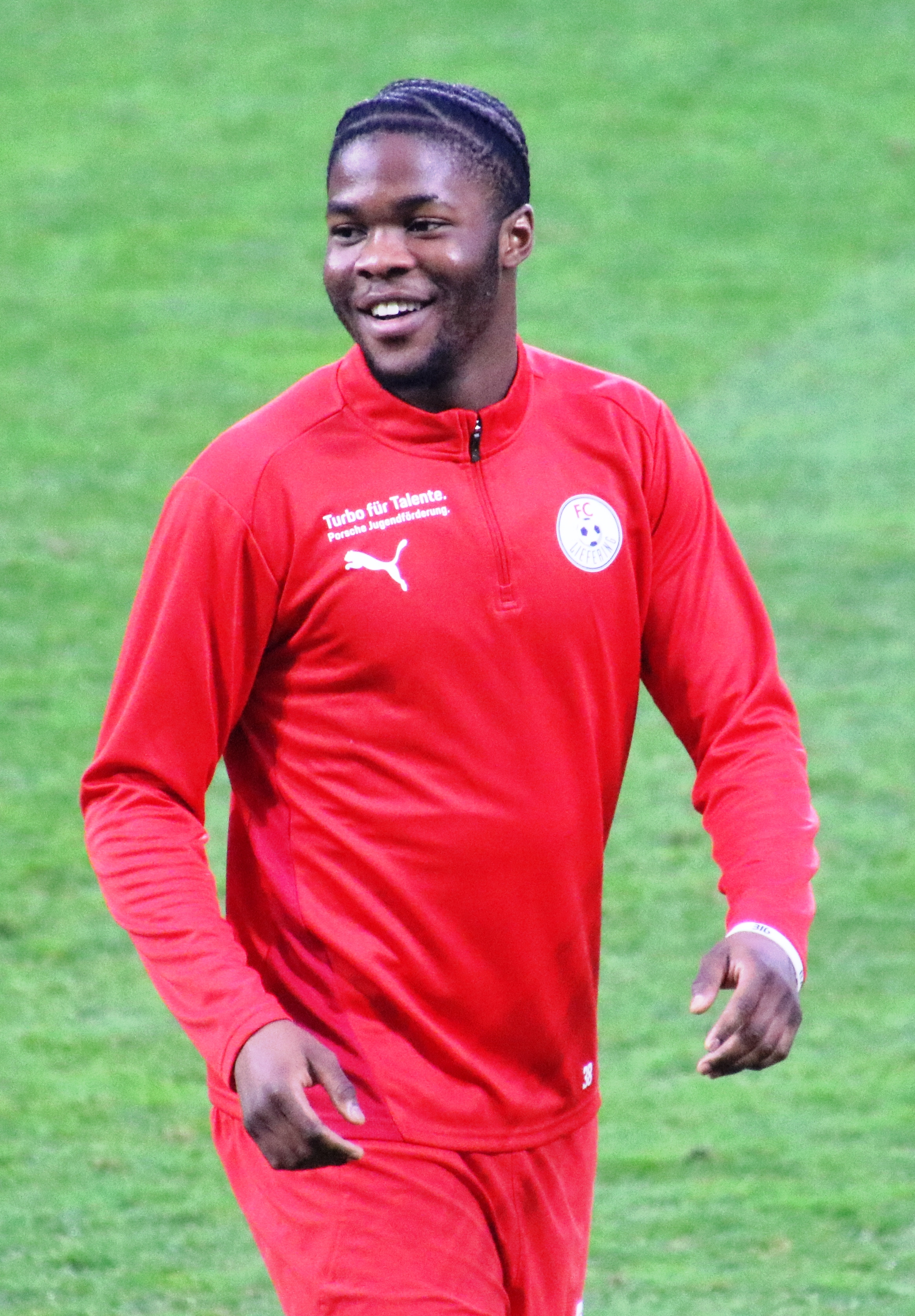
- Adejenughure in 2025

Personal information
- Full name: Oghenetejiri Kenneth Adejenughure
- Date of birth: 4 February 2007 (age 19)
- Place of birth: Austria
- Height: 1.85 m (6 ft 1 in)
- Position: Forward

Team information
- Current team: FC Liefering
- Number: 11

Youth career
- 2015–2018: First Vienna FC
- 2018–2021: Rapid Wien
- 2021–2024: Red Bull Salzburg

Senior career*
Years	Team	Apps	(Gls)
2024–	FC Liefering	46	(8)

International career^{‡}
2021–2022	Austria U15	6	(1)
2022–2023	Austria U16	8	(8)
2023–2024	Austria U17	12	(8)
2024–	Austria U19	15	(6)
2026–	Austria U21	2	(0)
- * Club domestic league appearances and goals as of 10 October 2026 ‡ National team caps and goals as of 16:56, 6 October 2026 (UTC)

Oghenetejiri Kenneth Adejenughure (born 4 February 2007) is an Austrian professional footballer who plays as a forward for 2. Liga club FC Liefering.

== Career ==
Adejenughure is a youth product of First Vienna FC and Rapid Wien, before moving to the youth academy of Red Bull Salzburg in February 2021. He was promoted to the FC Liefering squad for the 2024–25 season. He made his professional debut 2. Liga in August 2024 against First Vienna FC. On 15 October 2024, he was named by English newspaper The Guardian as one of the best players born in 2007 worldwide.

== International ==
Born in Austria, he is of Nigerian descent. Adejenughure played for an Austrian youth national team for the first time in November 2021. In 2024, he took part at the 2024 UEFA European Under-17 Championships, scoring four goals in four games.

== Career statistics ==
As of match played 10 October 2026

Appearances and goals by club, season and competition
Club	Season	League			Cup		Other		Total	
Club	Season	Division	Apps	Goals	Apps	Goals	Apps	Goals	Apps	Goals
FC Liefering	2024–25	2. Liga	18	2	—		—		18	2
FC Liefering	2025–26	2. Liga	20	3	—		—		20	3
FC Liefering	2026–27	2. Liga	8	3	—		—		8	3
Career total			46	8	0	0	0	0	46	8
