= Francesco Camarda =

Italian footballer (born 2008)

Personal information
- Full name: Francesco Camarda
- Date of birth: 10 March 2008 (age 18)
- Place of birth: Milan, Italy
- Height: 1.89 m (6 ft 2 in)
- Position: Striker

Team information
- Current team: AC Milan
- Number: 73

Youth career
- 2014–2015: Afforese
- 2015–2023: AC Milan

Senior career*
Years	Team	Apps	(Gls)
2023–	AC Milan	16	(0)
2024–2025	Milan Futuro (res.)	18	(5)
2025–2026	→ Lecce (loan)	21	(1)

International career^{‡}
2022–2023	Italy U15	9	(6)
2022–2023	Italy U16	7	(3)
2023–2024	Italy U17	17	(11)
2024–2025	Italy U19	10	(6)
2025–	Italy U21	8	(5)
2026–	Italy	2	(0)
Medal record
Men's football
Representing Italy
UEFA European Under-17 Championship
Winner	2024 Cyprus
- * Club domestic league appearances and goals as of 15:38, 29 October 2026 (UTC) ‡ National team caps and goals as of 16 November 2026

Francesco Camarda (born 10 March 2008) is an Italian professional footballer who plays as a striker for Serie A club AC Milan and the Italy national team.

At 15 years and 260 days, he is the youngest debutant in Serie A history, while at 16 years and 226 days, he is the youngest Italian debutant in the UEFA Champions League.

== Early life ==
Camarda was born in Milan, Italy. As a child, he also took an interest in kickboxing.

== Club career ==
=== AC Milan ===
==== Youth ====
Camarda started his career with Afforese, a football school in Affori, Milan, where he grew up. During his time with Afforese, he trained with the academy of professional side AC Milan, and went on to join the club permanently in 2015, after just over a year with Afforese. In his first training session with AC Milan, he was deployed as a defender, but after continually dribbling through the opposition teams and scoring, he was moved up front to play as a striker.

During his time in the academy of AC Milan, Camarda established himself as a prolific goal-scorer; at an under-9 tournament in Vienna, Austria, he was taken off due to injury with his side 2–0 down to German opposition Bayern Munich. He asked his coach to return to the field and went on to score two goals and provide an assist in the eventual 3–2 win. His prolific form continued as he progressed through the academy, and he went on to score 22 goals in 24 games for AC Milan's under-15 side, leading them to the under-15 Scudetto title.

Eventually, his goal-scoring feats drew the attention of international media, and he was lauded for having scored 485 goals in only 89 matches for AC Milan's academy, an average of 5.45 goals per game. He trained with AC Milan's under-19 side at the age of fourteen, and scored two goals for the side in a friendly win against Eccellenza team Solbiatese.

Camarda made his UEFA Youth League debut against Newcastle United on 19 September 2023, scoring a brace in a 4–0 victory. These goals made Camarda the second-youngest player to score a brace in the tournament and the youngest-ever Italian goalscorer at 15 years, 193 days, breaking Fabrizio Caligara's record of 16 years, 189 days.

==== Senior ====
In November 2023, amid an injury crisis, AC Milan manager Stefano Pioli called up Camarda as part of the first team squad for the Serie A game against Fiorentina on 25 November 2023; in order to do so, the club had to specifically request an authorization from the Italian Football Federation, as under-16 players are normally not allowed to be part of an Italian first team. He was eventually substituted on for Luka Jović in the 83rd minute, becoming the youngest Serie A footballer ever at 15 years, 260 days of age.

Camarda made his debut for the newly created reserve team Milan Futuro on 10 August 2024, starting for a 3–0 away win Coppa Italia Serie C first round match against Lecco. A week later, on 17 August 2024, he scored the two goals of a 2–1 Milan Futuro away win Coppa Italia Serie C round of 16 match against Novara.

Camarda became the youngest Italian to debut in the Champions League at 16 years and 226 days, 42 days younger than previous record holder Moise Kean, and the seventh youngest player in the competition's history, after coming on as a substitute in the 75th minute against Club Brugge on 22 October 2024. Appearing to score within minutes of being introduced, Camarda's goal was subsequently disallowed for offside following a VAR check, but he still received a yellow card for having celebrated by removing his shirt.

==== Loan to Lecce ====
On 7 July 2025, Camarda joined fellow Serie A club Lecce on loan for the 2025–26 season, with an option to make the move permanent. Later that year, on 28 September, he scored his first Serie A goal in the stoppage time of a 2–2 draw against Bologna, becoming the youngest Lecce player to achieve this feat, aged 17 years and 202 days.

On 16 June 2026, Lecce activated Camarda's buy option from AC Milan, and signed him permanently ahead of the 2026–27 season.

==== Return to AC Milan ====
On 18 June 2026, AC Milan exercised their buy-back clause for Camarda, and he rejoined the Rossoneri for the 2026–27 season.

== International career ==
Camarda has represented Italy at under-15, under-16, and under-17 levels.

With the U17 side he won the 2024 UEFA European Under-17 Championship, in which he scored four goals and was named Player of the Tournament. In the same year, with the Italy U19 he also took part in the 2024 UEFA European Under-19 Championship, in which he scored two goals.

In May 2026, Camarda was one of the players who were called up with the Italy national senior squad by interim head coach Silvio Baldini, for the friendly matches against Luxembourg and Greece on 3 and 7 June 2026, respectively.

== Career statistics ==
=== Club ===
As of match played 5 November 2026

Appearances and goals by club, season and competition
Club	Season	League			National cup (Note: Includes Coppa Italia Serie C, Coppa Italia)		Europe		Total	
Club	Season	Division	Apps	Goals	Apps	Goals	Apps	Goals	Apps	Goals
AC Milan	2023–24	Serie A	2	0	0	0	0	0	2	0
AC Milan	2024–25	Serie A	10	0	0	0	4 (Note: Appearances in UEFA Champions League)	0	14	0
AC Milan	2026–27	Serie A	4	0	0	0	2 (Note: Appearances in UEFA Europa League)	0	6	0
AC Milan	Total		16	0	0	0	6	0	22	0
Milan Futuro	2024–25	Serie C	18	5	2	2	—		20	7
Lecce (loan)	2025–26	Serie A	21	1	2	0	—		23	1
Career total			55	6	4	2	6	0	65	8

=== International ===
As of match played 7 June 2026

Appearances and goals by national team and year
National team	Year	Apps	Goals
Italy	2026	2	0
Total		2	0

== Honours ==
AC Milan

- Supercoppa Italiana: 2024

Italy U17

- UEFA European Under-17 Championship: 2024

Individual

- UEFA European Under-17 Championship Player of the Tournament: 2024
- UEFA European Under-17 Championship Team of the Tournament: 2024
