= Emanuel Benjamín =

Italian footballer (born 2007)

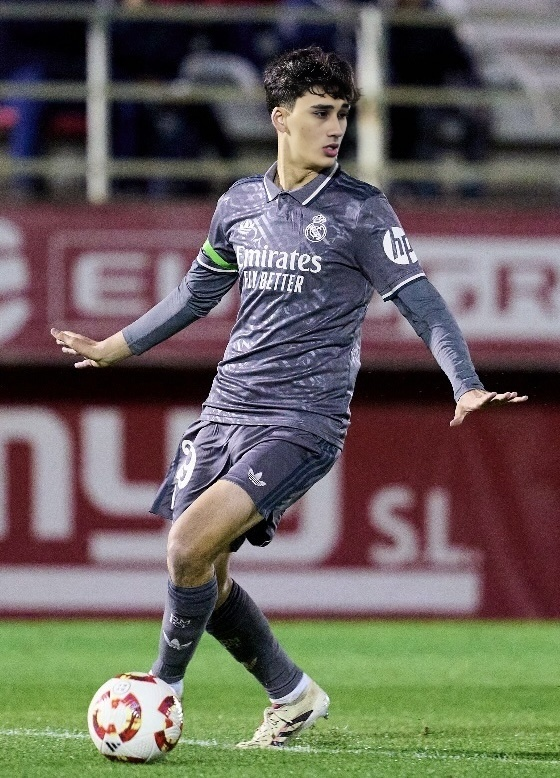
- Emanuel Benjamín in 2025

Personal information
- Full name: Emanuel Benjamín de Santana Balbinot
- Date of birth: 14 July 2007 (age 19)
- Place of birth: Blumenau, Brazil
- Position: Defender

Team information
- Current team: Real Madrid C
- Number: 22

Youth career
- 2018–2019: Complutense
- 2019–2021: Rayo Vallecano
- 2021–2022: Getafe
- 2022–2025: Real Madrid

Senior career*
Years	Team	Apps	(Gls)
2024–2026	Real Madrid C	18	(1)

International career^{‡}
2024–2025	Italy U17	11	(0)
2024–	Italy U18	2	(0)
2025–	Italy U20	1	(0)
Medal record
Men's football
Representing Italy
UEFA European Under-17 Championship
Winner	2024 Cyprus
- * Club domestic league appearances and goals as of 7 May 2026 ‡ National team caps and goals as of 9 September 2025

Emanuel Benjamín de Santana Balbinot (born 14 July 2007) is a footballer who plays for Porto B. Born in Brazil, he represents Italy at youth level.

== Early life ==
Benjamín was born in Blumenau, Santa Catarina to Jefferson Alvés Balbinot and Marcela Regina de Sant'ana Balbinot. In Brazil, he started playing futsal, but in 2018 he and his family moved to Spain.

He is of Italian descent; his grandparents are from Pievepelago, Emilia-Romagna, and he earned Italian citizenship as a result. His brothers, Samuel and Miguel, are also footballers for Atlético Madrid.

== Club career ==
Benjamín started playing football instead of futsal when he moved to Spain, joining Complutense and, one year later, Rayo Vallecano. During his first season at Rayo, he played as a forward, maintaining an average of one goal per game. However, due to his small frame, which was not suited for a true center forward, he was moved to the wing. In 2021 he moved to Getafe and then to Real Madrid "Juvenil A", making in his debuts season 4 goals in 24 games.

== International career ==
As Benjamín holds both Italian and Brazilian citizenship, he was eligible to play for both the Italian and Brazilian national teams. In 2024, he was called up for the first time for Italy U17, with whom he won the 2024 UEFA European Under-17 Championship.

== Honours ==
Italy U17

- UEFA European Under-17 Championship: 2024

Individual

- UEFA European Under-17 Championship Team of the Tournament: 2024
