= Massimo Pessina =

Italian footballer (born 2007)

Personal information
- Date of birth: 25 December 2007 (age 18)
- Place of birth: Alzano Lombardo, Italy
- Height: 1.88 m (6 ft 2 in)
- Position: Goalkeeper

Team information
- Current team: Bologna
- Number: 25

Youth career
- G.S. Oratorio Fiorine
- 2016–2021: AlbinoLeffe
- 2021–2025: Bologna

Senior career*
| Years | Team | Apps | (Gls) |
| 2025– | Bologna | 6 | (0) |

International career^{‡}
| 2023 | Italy U16 | 5 | (0) |
| 2023–2024 | Italy U17 | 13 | (0) |
| 2024–2025 | Italy U18 | 5 | (0) |
| 2024– | Italy U19 | 12 | (0) |
Medal record
Men's football
Representing Italy
UEFA European Under-17 Championship
| Winner | 2024 Cyprus |
- * Club domestic league appearances and goals as of 17:00, 11 October 2026 (UTC) ‡ National team caps and goals as of 21:16, 8 July 2026 (UTC)

Massimo Pessina (born 25 December 2007) is an Italian professional footballer who plays as a goalkeeper for Serie A club Bologna.

== Club career ==
Pessina is a product of the youth academies of the Italian clubs Olginatese, AlbinoLeffe and Bologna. In the 2023–24 season, he was promoted to Bologna's Campionato Primavera 1 side. On 9 November 2025, he made his senior and professional debut with Bologna in a Serie A match against Napoli. He came on as a substitute in the 8th minute after the starting goalkeeper Łukasz Skorupski was injured, and helped the team to a 2–0 victory with a clean sheet.

== International career ==
Pessina played for the Italy U17s that won the 2024 UEFA European Under-17 Championship. He was named in the "2024 UEFA European Under-17 Championship Team of the Tournament" for his performance. Pessina was called up to the Italy U19s in August 2025.

He was one of the players who were called up with the Italy national team by head coach Roberto Mancini for the 2026–27 UEFA Nations League matches against Belgium, Turkey and France between 25 September and 5 October 2026.

== Career statistics ==
As of match played 11 October 2026

Appearances and goals by club, season and competition
| Club | Season | League | | | Cup | | Europe | | Other | | Total | |
| Club | Season | Division | Apps | Goals | Apps | Goals | Apps | Goals | Apps | Goals | Apps | Goals |
|---|---|---|---|---|---|---|---|---|---|---|---|---|
| Bologna | 2024–25 | Serie A | 0 | 0 | 0 | 0 | 0 | 0 | — | | 0 | 0 |
| Bologna | 2025–26 | Serie A | 4 | 0 | 0 | 0 | 0 | 0 | 0 | 0 | 4 | 0 |
| Bologna | 2026–27 | Serie A | 2 | 0 | 0 | 0 | — | | — | | 2 | 0 |
| Career total | | | 6 | 0 | 0 | 0 | 0 | 0 | 0 | 0 | 6 | 0 |

== Honours ==
Italy U17

- UEFA European Under-17 Championship: 2024

Individual

- 2024 UEFA European Under-17 Championship Team of the Tournament
