= Genesis Antwi =

Swedish footballer (born 2007)

Personal information
- Full name: Genesis Kofi Koranteng Antwi
- Date of birth: 11 May 2007 (age 19)
- Place of birth: Stockholm, Sweden
- Height: 1.89 m (6 ft 2 in)
- Position: Defender

Team information
- Current team: Strasbourg (on loan from Chelsea)
- Number: 16

Youth career
- –2014: Hammarby
- 2014–2018: Sutton United
- 2018–2025: Chelsea

Senior career*
Years	Team	Apps	(Gls)
2025–	Chelsea	0	(0)
2026–	→ Strasbourg (loan)	8	(0)

International career^{‡}
2022	England U16	1	(0)
2023–2024	Sweden U17	12	(3)
2024–2025	Sweden U19	8	(0)
2025–	Sweden U21	5	(0)
2026–	Sweden	1	(0)
- * Club domestic league appearances and goals as of 1 November 2026 ‡ National team caps and goals as of 21:54, 17 November 2026 (UTC)

Genesis Kofi Koranteng Antwi (born 11 May 2007) is a Swedish professional footballer who plays as a defender for Ligue 1 club Strasbourg on loan from Premier League club Chelsea and the Sweden national team. Born in Sweden, he previously represented England as a youth international before switching his allegiance to Sweden.

== Early life ==
Antwi was born on 11 May 2007 in Stockholm, Sweden to Ghanaian parents. At the age of seven, he moved to England with his family.

== Club career ==
As a youth player, Antwi joined the youth academy of Swedish side Hammarby. At the age of eleven, he joined the youth academy of English Premier League side Chelsea and was promoted to the club's senior team in 2025. On 13 March 2025, he debuted for them during a 1–0 home win over Copenhagen in the UEFA Conference League.

On 3 August 2026, Antwi joined Ligue 1 club Strasbourg on a season-long loan.

== International career ==
Antwi has represented England at under-16 level, before switching to Sweden from under-16 to under-21 level. He is also eligible to represent Ghana through his Ghanaian parents.

Antwi was one of the 25 players who were called up for the Sweden national team by head coach Graham Potter for the 2026–27 UEFA Nations League matches against Bosnia and Herzegovina and Poland on 14 and 17 November 2026, respectively.

== Career statistics ==
=== Club ===
As of match played 17 October 2026

Appearances and goals by club, season and competition
Club	Season	League			FA Cup		EFL Cup		Europe		Other		Total	
Club	Season	Division	Apps	Goals	Apps	Goals	Apps	Goals	Apps	Goals	Apps	Goals	Apps	Goals
Chelsea	2024–25	Premier League	0	0	0	0	0	0	2 (Note: Appearances in UEFA Conference League)	0	0	0	2	0
Chelsea U21	2025–26	—			—		—		—		1 (Note: Appearance in EFL Trophy)	0	1	0
Strasbourg (loan)	2026–27	Ligue 1	7	0	0	0	—		—		—		7	0
Career total			7	0	0	0	0	0	2	0	1	0	10	0

=== International ===
As of match played 17 November 2026

Appearances and goals by national team and year
National team	Year	Apps	Goals
Sweden	2026	1	0
Total		1	0

== Honours ==
Chelsea

- UEFA Conference League: 2024–25
