= Kyrylo Dihtyar =

Ukrainian footballer (born 2007)

Personal information
- Full name: Kyrylo Serhiyovych Dihtyar
- Date of birth: 25 November 2007 (age 18)
- Place of birth: Kharkiv, Ukraine
- Height: 1.82 m (6 ft 0 in)
- Position: Centre-back

Team information
- Current team: Metalist Kharkiv
- Number: 8

Youth career
- 2016–2023: Metalist Kharkiv

Senior career*
Years	Team	Apps	(Gls)
2023–	Metalist Kharkiv	62	(2)

International career^{‡}
2023	Ukraine U16	3	(0)
2022–2024	Ukraine U17	13	(1)
2024–	Ukraine U19	7	(0)
2025	Ukraine U20	7	(1)
- * Club domestic league appearances and goals as of 4 June 2026 ‡ National team caps and goals as of 12 November 2025

Kyrylo Serhiyovych Dihtyar (Ukrainian: Кирило Сергійович Дігтярь; born 25 November 2007) is a Ukrainian professional footballer who plays as a centre-back for Metalist Kharkiv in the Ukrainian First League.

== Club career ==
Dihtyar is a product of Metalist Kharkiv academy.

He made his debut as a second half-time substituted player for Metalist Kharkiv in the Ukrainian Premier League in an away losing match against SC Dnipro-1 on 3 May 2023.

== International career ==
In February 2023, Dihtyar was called up to the final squad of the Ukraine national under-17 football team to play in the 2023 UEFA European Under-17 Championship qualification elit round matches.

Also, in July 2024, Dihtyar was called up by manager Dmytro Mykhaylenko to the final squad of the Ukraine national under-19 football team to play in the 2024 UEFA European Under-19 Championship tournament matches.

== Personal life ==
Since 3 May 2023, Dihtyar holds a record in Ukraine for being the youngest professional player of the Ukrainian top professional football league when at the age of 15 years and 159 days played for Metalist Kharkiv against SC Dnipro-1. The previous record over 30 years belonged to Yuriy Fenin when at the age of 15 years and 221 days he played for Tavriya Simferopol against FC Zorya-MALS Luhansk in 1992.
