= Valentin Zabransky =

Austrian footballer (born 2007)

- Valentin Zabransky with RB Salzburg in a Bundesliga game against Austria Wien

Personal information
- Date of birth: 2 February 2007 (age 19)
- Place of birth: Vienna, Austria
- Height: 1.93 m (6 ft 4 in)
- Position: Centre-back

Team information
- Current team: RB Salzburg
- Number: 47

Youth career
- 2013–2015: SV Essling
- 2015–2021: FC Stadlau
- 2021–2026: RB Salzburg

Senior career*
Years	Team	Apps	(Gls)
2024–2026	FC Liefering	28	(0)
2026–	RB Salzburg	13	(0)

International career^{‡}
2021–2022	Austria U15	6	(1)
2022–2023	Austria U16	9	(0)
2023–2024	Austria U17	7	(1)
2024–2026	Austria U19	13	(0)
2026–	Austria U21	2	(0)
- * Club domestic league appearances and goals as of 25 October 2026 ‡ National team caps and goals as of 10 October 2026

Valentin Zabransky (born 2 February 2007) is an Austrian professional footballer who plays as a centre-back for RB Salzburg.

== Club career ==
Born in Vienna, Zabransky is a youth product of SV Essling, FC Stadlau and RB Salzburg.

He started his professional carrier in the Austrian second tier with satellite club FC Liefering during the 2024–25 season.

In February 2025, he signed his first professional contract with the club from Salzburg.

After another season with FC Liefering he was promoted to the first team by new manager Danny Röhl during the summer 2026.

Zabransky made his professional debut with RB Salzburg in a 7–1 away Austrian Cup win over SV Oberwart on 25 July 2026.

His Austrian Football Bundesliga debut soon followed, and Zabransky became a clear starter in the league, also having played a central role in their Europa League qualification, emerging as one of the revelations of the club during the first months of the season.

== International career ==
Zabransky is a youth international for Austria, having played for the under-15, under-16, under-17 and under-19.

He was first called with the under-21 Austrian team in May 2026, making his debut with them in October that same year.

== Career statistics ==
As of match played 25 October 2026

Appearances and goals by club, season and competition
Club	Season	League			Cup		Europe		Other		Total	
Club	Season	Division	Apps	Goals	Apps	Goals	Apps	Goals	Apps	Goals	Apps	Goals
FC Liefering	2024–25	2. Liga	8	0	—		—		—		8	0
FC Liefering	2025–26	2. Liga	20	0	—		—		—		20	0
FC Liefering	Total		28	0	—		—		—28		0	
Red Bull Salzburg	2026–27	Austrian Bundesliga	8	0	3	0	5 (Note: Appearances in UEFA Europa League)	0	—		16	0
Career total			36	0	3	0	5	0	0	0	44	0
