= Martin Scherb =

Austrian footballer and manager

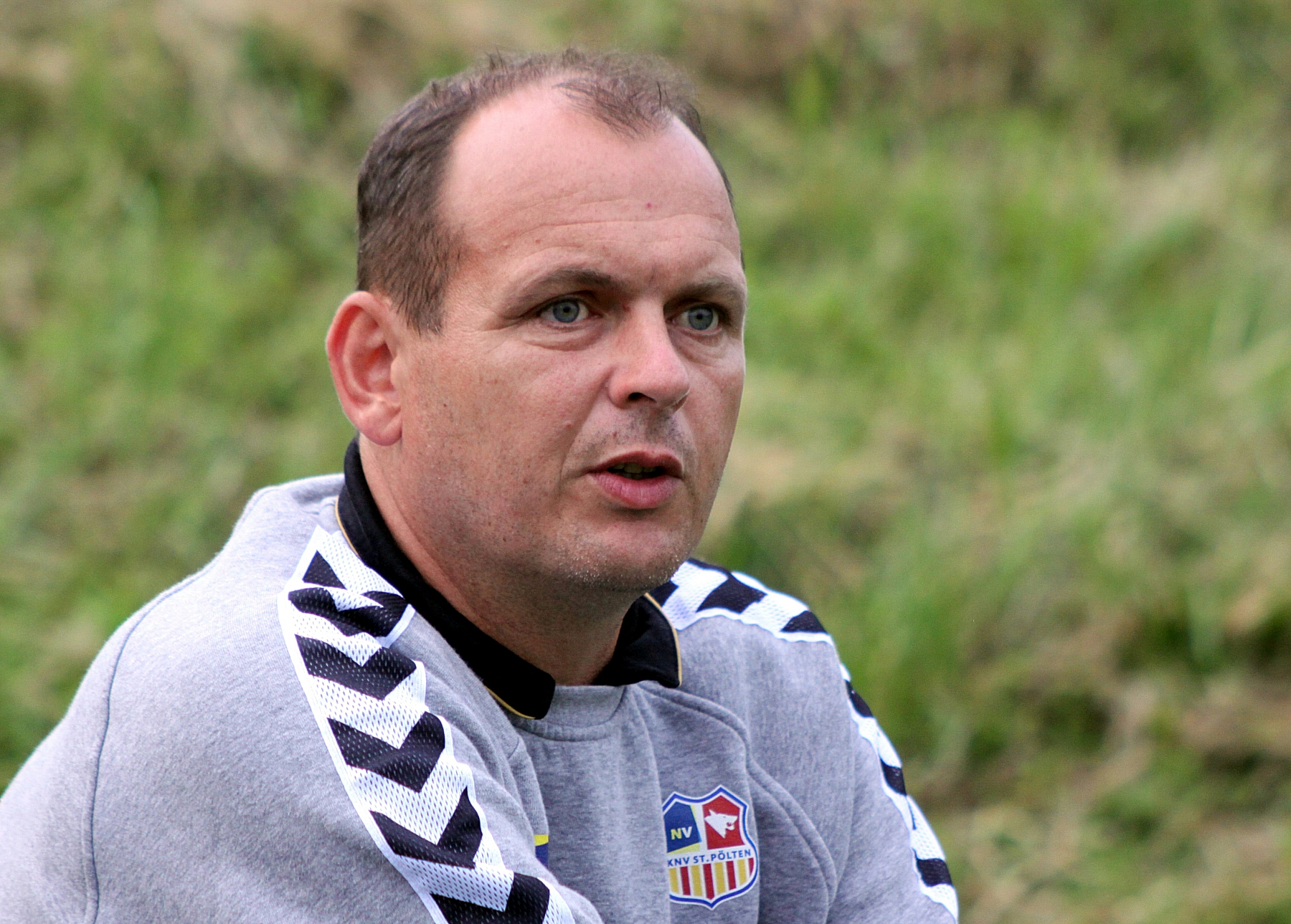
- Scherb as SKN St. Pölten coach

Personal information
- Date of birth: 23 June 1969 (age 57)
- Place of birth: Sankt Pölten, Austria
- Position: Forward

Senior career*
Years	Team	Apps	(Gls)
- SC St. Pölten
- FC Sturm 19 St. Pölten
- FC Amaliendorf
- SV Maria Anzbach
- SV Gmünd
- SC Herzogenburg

Managerial career
- 1993: Kremser SC Jugend
- 1996–2001: SC St. Pölten
- 2001–2002: SV Maria Anzbach
- 2002–2003: SC Herzogenburg
- 2003–2004: SV Maria Anzbach FC Tulln
- 2005: FC Tulln
- 2005–2006: SC Herzogenburg
- 2007–2013: SKN St. Pölten
- 2016–2017: SC Rheindorf Altach
- * Club domestic league appearances and goals

Martin Scherb (born 23 June 1969) is an Austrian football manager and former player.
