= Italy national under-15 football team =

National association football team

Italy Under 15
- Association: Federazione Italiana Giuoco Calcio
- Confederation: UEFA (Europe)
- Head coach: Enrico Battisti
- FIFA code: ITA
First colours	Second colours

The Italy national U-15 football team is the national under-15 football team of Italy and is controlled by the Italian Football Federation.

The Italy U15 football team is a feeder team of Italy U16.

== History ==
In the past, the commencing of national under-15 team depends on the result of Italy national under-17 football team. Usually, as U17 team failed to qualify to UEFA European Under-17 Football Championship, the disqualified U17 team (U17 season ended earlier) became U18 team and the U16 feeder team changed its name to U17 (U17 team of next season starts earlier), thus a new U-16 team started, but with an age limit of U15. However, in 2002–03, U17 qualified to the final tournament, thus the aforementioned cycle did not start, thus the new U16 roster of next season (2003–04) finally carried the name "U15" for 2002–03 season, in a friendly tournament in June 2003. Nevertheless, the U15 team did not appear in 2005 or in 2009, which U17 also qualified. Instead, a summer training camp was held for U14–15 in recent years, for example, in 2007, 2009 as well as Christmas youth tournament with U16 (e.g.: 2004, 2005, 2007, 2008; 2009)

The under-15 team became a regular basis since 2011–12 season as a feeder team of Italy national under-16 football team regardless of the result of U17.

The majority of the squad was selected from national "giovanissimi" under-15 league.
