= 2026 UEFA European Under-19 Championship qualification =

Tournament details
- Dates: Qualifying round: 8 October – 18 November 2025; Elite round: 25 March – 31 March 2026
- Teams: 53 (from 1 confederation)

Tournament statistics
- Matches played: 120
- Goals scored: 368 (3.07 per match)
- Top scorer(s): (Germany) Francis Onyeka (8 goals)
- All statistics correct as of 31 March 2026.

The 2026 UEFA European Under-19 Championship qualification was an under-19 men's national football team competition that determined the seven teams joining the automatically qualified hosts Wales in the 2026 UEFA European Under-19 Championship final tournament.

Russia were excluded from the tournament due to the ongoing invasion of Ukraine. Therefore, excluding hosts Wales, 53 teams entered this qualification competition, which consists of the Qualifying round played in September–November 2025, followed by the Elite round played in spring 2026. Spain received a bye to the Elite round and did not participate in the Qualifying round. Players born on or after 1 January 2007 are eligible to participate.

== Format ==
The qualification consists of two rounds; both consist of several groups, which are played as single-round-robin mini-tournaments, with one team from each group selected as the host after the draw.

- Qualifying round: Apart from Spain, which received a bye to the Elite round as the team with the highest seeding coefficient, the remaining 52 teams were drawn into 13 groups of four. The 13 group winners, the 13 runners-up, and the best third-placed team will advance to the Elite round.
- Elite round: 28 teams will be drawn into seven groups of four. The group winners will qualify for the final tournament.

=== Tiebreakers ===
In a group, teams are ranked according to points (3 points for a win, 1 point for a draw, 0 points for a loss), and if tied on points, the following tiebreaking criteria are applied, in the order given, to determine the rankings (Regulations Articles 14.01 and 14.02):

1. Points in head to head matches among tied teams
2. Goal difference in head to head matches among tied teams
3. Goals scored in head to head matches among tied teams
4. If more than two teams are tied, and after applying all head-to-head criteria above, a subset of teams are still tied, all head-to-head criteria above are reapplied exclusively to this subset of teams
5. Goal difference in all group matches
6. Goals scored in all group matches
7. Penalty shoot-out if only two teams have the same number of points, and they met in the last round of the group and are tied after applying all criteria above (not used if more than two teams have the same number of points, or if their rankings are not relevant for qualification for the next stage)
8. Disciplinary points (red card = 3 points, yellow card = 1 point, expulsion for 2 yellow cards in one match = 3 points)
9. UEFA coefficient ranking for the Qualifying round draw

To determine the best third-placed team from the Qualifying round, the results against the teams in fourth place are discarded. The following criteria are applied (Regulations Articles 15.01 and 15.02):

1. Points
2. Goal difference
3. Goals scored
4. Disciplinary points
5. UEFA coefficient ranking for the Qualifying round draw

== Qualifying round ==
=== Draw ===
The draw for the Qualifying round was held on 5 December 2024, at the UEFA headquarters in Nyon, Switzerland.

The teams were seeded according to their coefficient ranking, calculated based on the following:

- 2019 UEFA European Under-19 Championship final tournament and qualifying competition (qualifying round and elite round)
- 2022 UEFA European Under-19 Championship final tournament and qualifying competition (qualifying round and elite round)
- 2023 UEFA European Under-19 Championship final tournament and qualifying competition (qualifying round and elite round)
- 2024 UEFA European Under-19 Championship final tournament and qualifying competition (qualifying round and elite round)

Each group contains one team from Pot A, one team from Pot B, one team from Pot C, and one team from Pot D. On the basis of decisions taken by the UEFA Executive Committee and the UEFA Emergency Panel, valid at the time of the draw, the following countries cannot be drawn into the same group: Armenia and Azerbaijan, Belarus and Ukraine, Kosovo and Serbia, Kosovo and Bosnia-Herzegovina.

Final tournament hosts: Team / Coeff. / Rank; Wales / 5.333 / —	Bye to Elite round: Team / Coeff. / Rank; Spain / 25.939 / 1

Teams entering Qualifying round

Pot A
Team	Coeff.	Rank
Italy	25.333	2
France	23.833	3
Portugal	21.667	4
Norway	18.278	5
England	15.944	6
Israel	15.556	7
Ukraine	14.722	8
Czech Republic	14.056	9
Republic of Ireland	13.444	10
Denmark	12.656	11
Turkey	12.222	12
Romania	11.833	13
Serbia	11.667	14

Pot B
Team	Coeff.	Rank
Belgium	10.900	15
Germany	10.833	16
Netherlands TH	10.333	17
Greece	10.167	18
Slovakia	10.167	19
Iceland	10.000	20
Croatia	9.833	21
Poland	9.333	22
Austria	8.833	23
Scotland	8.500	24
Hungary	8.333	25
Switzerland	8.000	26
Northern Ireland	7.500	27

Pot C
Team	Coeff.	Rank
Slovenia	7.333	28
Georgia	6.667	29
Bosnia and Herzegovina	6.500	30
Finland	6.500	31
Latvia	6.167	32
Sweden	5.833	33
Armenia	5.333	34
Malta	4.667	35
Montenegro	4.500	36
North Macedonia	4.167	37
Belarus	4.000	38
Cyprus	3.833	39
Bulgaria	3.667	40

Pot D
Team	Coeff.	Rank
Azerbaijan	3.500	41
Kosovo	3.333	42
Luxembourg	3.333	43
Lithuania	2.667	44
Estonia	2.333	45
Faroe Islands	1.333	46
Albania	1.333	47
Andorra	1.000	48
Kazakhstan	0.667	49
Moldova	0.667	50
Liechtenstein	0.333	51
San Marino	0.000	52
Gibraltar	0.000	53

=== Group 1 ===
Pos	Team	Pld	W	D	L	GF	GA	GD	Pts	Qualification
1	Netherlands (H)	3	3	0	0	13	3	+10	9	Elite round
2	Kazakhstan	3	1	1	1	3	3	0	4	Elite round
3	Republic of Ireland	3	1	0	2	3	5	−2	3	
4	Cyprus	3	0	1	2	1	9	−8	1	

Source: UEFA
Rules for classification: Tiebreakers
(H) Hosts
12 November 2025
19:00

Republic of Ireland	0–1	Kazakhstan
	Report	Tuyakbayev 56'

Sportpark Vondersweijde, Oldenzaal
Attendance: 103
Referee: Bence Csonka (Hungary)
12 November 2025
19:00

Cyprus	0–7	Netherlands
	Report	Thomas 30'; Agustien 36'; Van den Berg 47'; Van den Elshout 66', 84'; Bahaty 73'; Gürbüz 90+2'

Sportpark Bovenmolen, Oldebroek
Attendance: 718
Referee: Damian Kos (Poland)

15 November 2025
13:00

Republic of Ireland	1–0	Cyprus
Lynskey 11'	Report

Sportpark Bovenmolen, Oldebroek
Attendance: 153
Referee: Danilo Nikolić (Serbia)
15 November 2025
16:00

Netherlands	2–1	Kazakhstan
Thomas 27'; Johnson 32'	Report	Nurgali 86' (pen.)

Sportpark Vondersweijde, Oldenzaal
Attendance: 605
Referee: Bence Csonka (Hungary)

18 November 2025
19:00

Netherlands	4–2	Republic of Ireland
El Harmouz 11'; Kluivert 79'; Messori 83'; Van den Elshout 90+2'	Report	McCarthy 37'; Brennan 51'

Sportpark Bovenmolen, Oldebroek
Attendance: 646
Referee: Damian Kos (Poland)
18 November 2025
19:00

Kazakhstan	1–1	Cyprus
Birkurmanov 4'	Report	Tziortzis 59'

Sportpark Vondersweijde, Oldenzaal
Attendance: 39
Referee: Danilo Nikolić (Serbia)

=== Group 2 ===
Pos	Team	Pld	W	D	L	GF	GA	GD	Pts	Qualification
1	France	3	3	0	0	8	2	+6	9	Elite round
2	Hungary (H)	3	1	1	1	5	3	+2	4 (Note: Disciplinary points : Hungary -6, Bulgaria -10.)	Elite round
3	Bulgaria	3	1	1	1	5	3	+2	4	
4	Faroe Islands	3	0	0	3	0	10	−10	0	

Source: UEFA
Rules for classification: Tiebreakers
(H) Hosts
Notes:
12 November 2025
13:00

France	4–0	Faroe Islands
Coulibaly 8'; Peter 45+1' (pen.); Devernois 57'; Gadegbeku 62'	Report

Grosics Stadion, Tatabánya
Attendance: 35
Referee: João Gonçalves (Portugal)
12 November 2025
17:00

Bulgaria	1–1	Hungary
Boychev 19'	Report	Pál 54'

Gyirmóti Stadion, Győr
Attendance: 177
Referee: Matthew MacDermid (Scotland)

15 November 2025
13:00

France	2–1	Bulgaria
El Jamali 19' (pen.); Kana-Biyik 41'	Report	Penev 79'

Grosics Stadion, Tatabánya
Attendance: 51
Referee: Miloš Milanović (Serbia)
15 November 2025
18:00

Hungary	3–0	Faroe Islands
Németh 32'; Kovács 43' (pen.); Bodnar 90+2'	Report

Gyirmóti Stadion, Győr
Attendance: 196
Referee: João Gonçalves (Portugal)

18 November 2025
17:30

Hungary	1–2	France
Németh 57'	Report	Merah 22'; El Jamali 39'

Gyirmóti Stadion, Győr
Attendance: 268
Referee: Miloš Milanović (Serbia)
18 November 2025
17:30

Faroe Islands	0–3	Bulgaria
	Report	Stoyanchov 50'; Gigov 81'; Tsanev 90+4'

Grosics Stadion, Tatabánya
Attendance: 20
Referee: Matthew MacDermid (Scotland)

=== Group 3 ===
Pos	Team	Pld	W	D	L	GF	GA	GD	Pts	Qualification
1	Turkey (H)	3	3	0	0	11	1	+10	9	Elite round
2	Greece	3	2	0	1	11	2	+9	6	Elite round
3	Belarus	3	1	0	2	5	4	+1	3	
4	Liechtenstein	3	0	0	3	0	20	−20	0	

Source: UEFA
Rules for classification: Tiebreakers
(H) Hosts
12 November 2025
12:00

Belarus	0–2	Greece
	Report	Mythou 55'; Sokos 90+7'

Arslan Zeki Demirci Sports Complex, Manavgat
Attendance: 50
Referee: Bastien Dechepy (France)
12 November 2025
15:00

Turkey	7–0	Liechtenstein
Bulut 27'; Soylu 29', 59'; Çakiroğlu 45+1', 62'; Özcan 79', 80'	Report

Arslan Zeki Demirci Sports Complex, Manavgat
Attendance: 50
Referee: Tom Owen (Wales)

15 November 2025
12:00

Greece	8–0	Liechtenstein
Mythou 18', 24', 32' (pen.); Karargyris 48' (pen.); Dunga 65'; Tsigkas 75'; Kosidis 83' (pen.); Sokos 90+5'	Report

Arslan Zeki Demirci Sports Complex, Manavgat
Attendance: 53
Referee: Tom Owen (Wales)
15 November 2025
15:00

Turkey	2–0	Belarus
Maldar 24'; Özdemir 86'	Report

Arslan Zeki Demirci Sports Complex, Manavgat
Attendance: 121
Referee: Matteo Marcenaro (Italy)

18 November 2025
12:00

Greece	1–2	Turkey
Mythou 12' (pen.)	Report	Turhan 7', 51' (pen.)

Arslan Zeki Demirci Sports Complex, Manavgat
Attendance: 158
Referee: Matteo Marcenaro (Italy)
18 November 2025
12:00

Liechtenstein	0–5	Belarus
	Report	Grabtsevich 12'; Molchan 15'; Akatov 28', 38'; Gusev 86'

Arslan Zeki Demirci Sports Complex, Manavgat
Attendance: 10
Referee: Bastien Dechepy (France)

=== Group 4 ===
Pos	Team	Pld	W	D	L	GF	GA	GD	Pts	Qualification
1	Austria	3	3	0	0	8	1	+7	9	Elite round
2	Slovenia (H)	3	1	1	1	6	4	+2	4	Elite round
3	Israel	3	0	2	1	3	5	−2	2	
4	Luxembourg	3	0	1	2	1	8	−7	1	

Source: UEFA
Rules for classification: Tiebreakers
(H) Hosts
8 October 2025
15:30

Israel	0–0	Luxembourg
	Report

TŠC Trate Gornja Radgona, Gornja Radgona
Attendance: 42
Referee: Roman Jitari (Moldova)
8 October 2025
15:30

Slovenia	0–1	Austria
	Report	Riegel 72'

Ptuj City Stadium, Ptuj
Attendance: 230
Referee: Mikkel Redder (Denmark)

11 October 2025
15:30

Israel	2–2	Slovenia
Solel 59', 66'	Report	Aćimović 34'; Sztejfman 69' (o.g.)

Ptuj City Stadium, Ptuj
Attendance: 182
Referee: Edgars Maļcevs (Latvia)
11 October 2025
15:30

Austria	4–0	Luxembourg
Hämmerle 7' (pen.), 31' (pen.), 51'; Adejenughure 44'	Report

TŠC Trate Gornja Radgona, Gornja Radgona
Attendance: 150
Referee: Roman Jitari (Moldova)

14 October 2025
12:00

Austria	3–1	Israel
Hämmerle 27' (pen.); Riegel 76', 82'	Report	Simon 45+2'

TŠC Trate Gornja Radgona, Gornja Radgona
Attendance: 58
Referee: Edgars Maļcevs (Latvia)
14 October 2025
12:00

Luxembourg	1–4	Slovenia
Dos Santos 9'	Report	Pejičić 20', 59'; Aćimović 63'; Adrović 81'

Ptuj City Stadium, Ptuj
Attendance: 296
Referee: Mikkel Redder (Denmark)

=== Group 5 ===
Pos	Team	Pld	W	D	L	GF	GA	GD	Pts	Qualification
1	Ukraine	3	3	0	0	9	0	+9	9	Elite round
2	Slovakia	3	1	1	1	3	3	0	4	Elite round
3	Montenegro	3	1	0	2	1	6	−5	3	
4	Albania (H)	3	0	1	2	0	4	−4	1	

Source: UEFA
Rules for classification: Tiebreakers
(H) Hosts
12 November 2025
12:00

Montenegro	0–3	Slovakia
	Report	Valko 26'; Lusale 70'; Vlna 74'

Egnatia Arena, Rrogozhinë
Attendance: 70
Referee: Matthias Jöllenbeck (Germany)
12 November 2025
14:00

Ukraine	3–0	Albania
Redushko 34'; Popov 74'; Kamenskyi 88'	Report

Niko Dovana Stadium, Durrës
Attendance: 200
Referee: Joakim Östling (Sweden)

15 November 2025
12:00

Ukraine	3–0	Montenegro
Redushko 13'; Popov 27'; Kamenskyi 36'	Report

Egnatia Arena, Rrogozhinë
Attendance: 40
Referee: Christos Vergetis (Greece)
15 November 2025
14:00

Slovakia	0–0	Albania
	Report

Niko Dovana Stadium, Durrës
Attendance: 400
Referee: Joakim Östling (Sweden)

18 November 2025
14:00

Slovakia	0–3	Ukraine
	Report	Bohdanov 17'; Dihtyar 33'; Balog 45+1' (o.g.)

Egnatia Arena, Rrogozhinë
Attendance: 20
Referee: Christos Vergetis (Greece)
18 November 2025
14:00

Albania	0–1	Montenegro
	Report	Jovanović 78'

Niko Dovana Stadium, Durrës
Attendance: 80
Referee: Matthias Jöllenbeck (Germany)

=== Group 6 ===
Pos	Team	Pld	W	D	L	GF	GA	GD	Pts	Qualification
1	Croatia (H)	3	3	0	0	14	1	+13	9	Elite round
2	Serbia	3	2	0	1	8	5	+3	6	Elite round
3	Georgia	3	1	0	2	2	5	−3	3	
4	Gibraltar	3	0	0	3	0	13	−13	0	

Source: UEFA
Rules for classification: Tiebreakers
(H) Hosts
12 November 2025
11:30

Georgia	0–2	Croatia
	Report	Šimić 30'; Baković 76'

Stadion Branko Čavlović-Čavlek, Karlovac
Attendance: 224
Referee: Mohammad Usman Aslam (Norway)
12 November 2025
13:45

Serbia	4–0	Gibraltar
Borovina 9', 38'; Djorđević I 29'; Damjanović 74'	Report

Stadion Lučko, Lučko
Attendance: 50
Referee: Jacob Karlsen (Denmark)

15 November 2025
11:30

Croatia	8–0	Gibraltar
Vrzić 14', 77', 87'; Chelfi 25', 80'; Durdov 35'; Šimić 45+4'; Aščić 88'	Report

Stadion Branko Čavlović-Čavlek, Karlovac
Attendance: 118
Referee: Florian Badstübner (Germany)
15 November 2025
13:45

Serbia	3–1	Georgia
Kostov 59'; Djorđević I 76'; Cvetković 90+4'	Report	Nioradze 36'

Stadion Lučko, Lučko
Attendance: 50
Referee: Mohammad Usman Aslam (Norway)

18 November 2025
11:30

Croatia	4–1	Serbia
Puljić 29'; Šutalo 33', 72'; Zulfić 89'	Report	Zarić 16'

Sport Centre Rudes, Zagreb
Attendance: Without spectators
Referee: Florian Badstübner (Germany)
18 November 2025
11:30

Gibraltar	0–1	Georgia
	Report	Doltmourziev 53'

Stadion Lučko, Lučko
Attendance: 30
Referee: Jacob Karlsen (Denmark)

=== Group 7 ===
Pos	Team	Pld	W	D	L	GF	GA	GD	Pts	Qualification
1	Romania (H)	3	2	1	0	8	2	+6	7	Elite round
2	Finland	3	1	1	1	4	4	0	4	Elite round
3	Iceland	3	1	0	2	5	6	−1	3	
4	Andorra	3	1	0	2	2	7	−5	3	

Source: UEFA
Rules for classification: Tiebreakers
(H) Hosts
12 November 2025
10:00

Finland	3–2	Iceland
Vikström 12', 33', 87'	Report	Johannesson 21' (pen.); Daðason 70'

Football Centre FRF, Buftea
Attendance: 10
Referee: Simon Bourdeaud'hui (Belgium)
12 November 2025
15:00

Romania	4–1	Andorra
Toma 47'; Tomșa 58', 62'; Senciuc 83'	Report	Garcia 69'

Anghel Iordănescu Stadium, Voluntari
Attendance: 87
Referee: Menelaos Antoniou (Cyprus)

15 November 2025
10:00

Iceland	3–0	Andorra
Olsen 9', 41'; Daðason 90'	Report

Football Centre FRF, Buftea
Attendance: 10
Referee: Florian Lata (Albania)
15 November 2025
15:00

Romania	1–1	Finland
Gașpăr 22'	Report	Vikström 73'

Anghel Iordănescu Stadium, Voluntari
Attendance: 96
Referee: Menelaos Antoniou (Cyprus)

18 November 2025
15:00

Iceland	0–3	Romania
	Report	Tomșa 18'; Stoian 34'; Toma 64'

Concordia, Chiajna
Attendance: 85
Referee: Simon Bourdeaud'hui (Belgium)
18 November 2025
15:00

Andorra	1–0	Finland
Garcia 52'	Report

Football Centre FRF, Buftea
Attendance: 10
Referee: Florian Lata (Albania)

=== Group 8 ===
Pos	Team	Pld	W	D	L	GF	GA	GD	Pts	Qualification
1	England	3	3	0	0	13	0	+13	9	Elite round
2	Latvia	3	1	1	1	4	10	−6	4	Elite round
3	Lithuania (H)	3	1	0	2	3	5	−2	3	
4	Scotland	3	0	1	2	3	8	−5	1	

Source: UEFA
Rules for classification: Tiebreakers
(H) Hosts
12 November 2025
11:00

Latvia	2–2	Scotland
Siliņš 4'; Joksts 43'	Report	Landers 7' (pen.); Fletcher 36'

Raudondvario stadionas, Raudondvaris
Attendance: 117
Referee: Patrik Kolarić (Croatia)
12 November 2025
17:00

England	2–0	Lithuania
Mheuka 16' (pen.), 47'	Report

Raudondvario stadionas, Raudondvaris
Attendance: 487
Referee: Lothar D'hondt (Belgium)

15 November 2025
11:00

England	7–0	Latvia
Ngumoha 2'; Mukasa 11' (pen.), 72' (pen.); Derry 23', 52', 62'; Rigg 40'	Report

Raudondvario stadionas, Raudondvaris
Attendance: 157
Referee: Szabolcs Kovacs (Romania)
15 November 2025
17:00

Scotland	1–2	Lithuania
Stirton 35'	Report	Taučas 56'; Paukštys 79'

Raudondvario stadionas, Raudondvaris
Attendance: 291
Referee: Patrik Kolarić (Croatia)

18 November 2025
11:00

Scotland	0–4	England
	Report	Mheuka 24', 29'; Rigg 58'; Fletcher 89'

Raudondvario stadionas, Raudondvaris
Attendance: 73
Referee: Lothar D'hondt (Belgium)
18 November 2025
17:00

Lithuania	1–2	Latvia
Garbaliauskas 38'	Report	Gaļajevs 18'; Kukulis 53'

Raudondvario stadionas, Raudondvaris
Attendance: 287
Referee: Szabolcs Kovacs (Romania)

=== Group 9 ===
Pos	Team	Pld	W	D	L	GF	GA	GD	Pts	Qualification
1	Italy (H)	3	2	1	0	9	0	+9	7	Elite round
2	Poland	3	2	0	1	4	3	+1	6	Elite round
3	Moldova	3	1	0	2	2	10	−8	3	
4	Bosnia and Herzegovina	3	0	1	2	1	3	−2	1	

Source: UEFA
Rules for classification: Tiebreakers
(H) Hosts
12 November 2025
11:00

Bosnia and Herzegovina	1–2	Poland
Telalovic 90+6'	Report	Bzdyl 21'; Jakóbczyk 90+2'

Stadio Angelo Massimino, Catania
Attendance: 107
Referee: Bulat Sariyev (Kazakhstan)
12 November 2025
15:00

Italy	8–0	Moldova
Ciardi 5', 58'; Mosconi 13'; Coletta 16'; Sala 20'; Cocchi 69'; Cacciamani 72'; Cerpelletti 83'	Report

Stadio Aci e Galatea, Acireale
Attendance: 2,500
Referee: Mihály Káprály (Hungary)

15 November 2025
11:00

Poland	2–1	Moldova
Bzdyl 25', 51'	Report	Caragheorghi 31'

Stadio Aci e Galatea, Acireale
Attendance: 88
Referee: Igor Stojchevski (North Macedonia)
15 November 2025
15:00

Italy	0–0	Bosnia and Herzegovina
	Report

Stadio Angelo Massimino, Catania
Attendance: 2000
Referee: Bulat Sariyev (Kazakhstan)

18 November 2025
15:00

Poland	0–1	Italy
	Report	Idele 67'

Stadio Angelo Massimino, Catania
Attendance: 2000
Referee: Mihály Káprály (Hungary)
18 November 2025
15:00

Moldova	1–0	Bosnia and Herzegovina
Bejenaru 16'	Report

Stadio Aci e Galatea, Acireale
Attendance: 50
Referee: Igor Stojchevski (North Macedonia)

=== Group 10 ===
Pos	Team	Pld	W	D	L	GF	GA	GD	Pts	Qualification
1	Denmark	3	2	0	1	13	1	+12	6 (Note: Ranked on head-to-head goal difference: Denmark +6, Sweden 0, Switzerland –6.)	Elite round
2	Sweden	3	2	0	1	3	1	+2	6	Elite round
3	Switzerland (H)	3	2	0	1	4	7	−3	6	Elite round
4	San Marino	3	0	0	3	0	11	−11	0	

Source: UEFA
Rules for classification: Tiebreakers
(H) Hosts
Notes:
12 November 2025
12:30

Denmark	6–0	San Marino
Hyseni 44'; Ambæk 46'; Johannesen 58', 71'; Gustafsen 61'; Møller 83'	Report

Esp Stadium, Baden
Attendance: 50
Referee: Helgi Mikael Jónasson (Iceland)
12 November 2025
18:30

Sweden	0–1	Switzerland
	Report	Vasovic 37' (pen.)

Esp Stadium, Baden
Attendance: 1,478
Referee: Henrik Nalbandyan (Armenia)

15 November 2025
12:30

Switzerland	3–0	San Marino
Rufener 21'; Da Silva 69'; Vasovic 90+3'	Report

Esp Stadium, Baden
Attendance: 1,692
Referee: Helgi Mikael Jónasson (Iceland)
15 November 2025
18:30

Denmark	0–1	Sweden
	Report	Geiger 56'

Esp Stadium, Baden
Attendance: 80
Referee: Ante Čulina (Croatia)

18 November 2025
18:30

Switzerland	0–7	Denmark
	Report	Schjøtt 7'; Møller 18'; Martin 48'; Gøthler 57'; Hyseni 60'; Emefile 86'; Rasmussen 89'

Esp Stadium, Baden
Attendance: 1,892
Referee: Henrik Nalbandyan (Armenia)
18 November 2025
18:30

San Marino	0–2	Sweden
	Report	Filling 81', 85'

Tissot Arena, Biel
Attendance: 34
Referee: Ante Čulina (Croatia)

=== Group 11 ===
Pos	Team	Pld	W	D	L	GF	GA	GD	Pts	Qualification
1	Portugal (H)	3	1	2	0	6	3	+3	5	Elite round
2	Belgium	3	1	2	0	3	2	+1	5	Elite round
3	North Macedonia	3	1	0	2	3	5	−2	3	
4	Estonia	3	0	2	1	2	4	−2	2	

Source: UEFA
Rules for classification: Tiebreakers
(H) Hosts
12 November 2025
15:00

North Macedonia	0–1	Belgium
	Report	Musuayi 72'

Estádio Municipal de Lousada, Lousada
Attendance: 52
Referee: Snir Levy (Israel)
12 November 2025
18:00

Portugal	1–1	Estonia
Silva 38'	Report	Skvortsov 62'

Estádio do CD Aves, Aves
Attendance: 211
Referee: Lukasz Kuzma (Poland)

15 November 2025
15:00

Belgium	1–1	Estonia
Van Britsom 82'	Report	Hint 75'

Estádio Municipal de Lousada, Lousada
Attendance: 30
Referee: Snir Levy (Israel)
15 November 2025
18:00

Portugal	4–1	North Macedonia
Patrão 6'; Silva 26'; Soares 38'; Trovisco 66'	Report	Sabotikj 71'

Estádio Municipal das Laranjeiras, Paredes
Attendance: 414
Referee: Jamie Robinson (Northern Ireland)

18 November 2025
18:00

Belgium	1–1	Portugal
Decresson 16'	Report	Gonçalves 52' (pen.)

Estádio Capital do Móvel, Paços de Ferreira
Attendance: 349
Referee: Lukasz Kuzma (Poland)
18 November 2025
18:00

Estonia	0–2	North Macedonia
	Report	Sabotikj 20'; Latifi 65'

Complexo Desportivo Monte Azevido, Rebordosa
Attendance: 35
Referee: Jamie Robinson (Northern Ireland)

=== Group 12 ===
Pos	Team	Pld	W	D	L	GF	GA	GD	Pts	Qualification
1	Germany	3	3	0	0	14	1	+13	9	Elite round
2	Norway (H)	3	2	0	1	9	2	+7	6	Elite round
3	Kosovo	3	1	0	2	3	9	−6	3	
4	Armenia	3	0	0	3	0	14	−14	0	

Source: UEFA
Rules for classification: Tiebreakers
(H) Hosts
8 October 2025
15:00

Norway	4–0	Kosovo
Røssing-Lelesiit 64', 88' (pen.); Nilsen-Modebe 82', 90+1'	Report

Odd Stadion, Skien
Attendance: 251
Referee: Matteo Marchetti (Italy)
8 October 2025
19:00

Armenia	0–7	Germany
	Report	Stange 16'; Licina 30'; Schmetgens 55'; Onyeka 61' (pen.), 65'; Souza 81' (pen.); Culbreath 90+2'

Odd Stadion, Skien
Attendance: 107
Referee: Stefan Ebner (Austria)

11 October 2025
15:00

Norway	4–0	Armenia
Spiten-Nysæter 43'; West 68'; Nilsen-Modebe 81' (pen.); Wæhler 83'	Report

Odd Stadion, Skien
Attendance: 197
Referee: Stefan Ebner (Austria)
11 October 2025
19:00

Germany	5–0	Kosovo
Souza 9', 52'; Erlein 27'; Onyeka 50', 88'	Report

Odd Stadion, Skien
Attendance: 137
Referee: Marc Nagtegaal (The Netherlands)

14 October 2025
17:00

Germany	2–1	Norway
Onyeka 40' (pen.), 45+1' (pen.)	Report	Spiten-Nysæther 90+2'

Odd Stadion, Skien
Attendance: 387
Referee: Matteo Marchetti (Italy)
14 October 2025
17:00

Kosovo	3–0	Armenia
Ahmeti 12'; Rrahmani 36'; Abdullahu 55'	Report

Sandefjord Arena, Sandefjord
Attendance: 100
Referee: Marc Nagtegaal (The Netherlands)

=== Group 13 ===
Pos	Team	Pld	W	D	L	GF	GA	GD	Pts	Qualification
1	Czech Republic	3	2	1	0	12	3	+9	7	Elite round
2	Northern Ireland	3	2	0	1	2	4	−2	6	Elite round
3	Azerbaijan	3	1	0	2	3	8	−5	3	
4	Malta (H)	3	0	1	2	3	5	−2	1	

Source: UEFA
Rules for classification: Tiebreakers
(H) Hosts
12 November 2025
11:00

Malta	0–1	Northern Ireland
	Report	Simpson 25'

Centenary Stadium, Ta' Qali
Attendance: 97
Referee: Sayat Karabayev (Kazakhstan)
12 November 2025
14:30

Czech Republic	6–1	Azerbaijan
Penxa 45'; Buffon 54', 64', 90+3'; Švancara 83'; Sosna 88'	Report	Jafarov 70'

Centenary Stadium, Ta' Qali
Attendance: 25
Referee: Oliver Reitala (Finland)

15 November 2025
11:00

Czech Republic	2–2	Malta
Míček 18', 90+4'	Report	Farrugia 59'; Borg 90+2'

Centenary Stadium, Ta' Qali
Attendance: 122
Referee: Kyriakos Athanasiou (Cyprus)
15 November 2025
14:30

Northern Ireland	1–0	Azerbaijan
Graham 33'	Report

Centenary Stadium, Ta' Qali
Attendance: 23
Referee: Sayat Karabayev (Kazakhstan)

18 November 2025
11:00

Northern Ireland	0–4	Czech Republic
	Report	Buffon 35', 42', 59'; Penxa 76'

National Stadium, Ta' Qali
Attendance: 43
Referee: Kyriakos Athanasiou (Cyprus)
18 November 2025
11:00

Azerbaijan	2–1	Malta
Orujov 60'; Jafarov 80'	Report	Farrugia 49'

Centenary Stadium, Ta' Qali
Attendance: 137
Referee: Oliver Reitala (Finland)

=== Ranking of third-placed teams ===
To determine the best third-placed team from the Qualifying round, only the results of the third-placed teams against the first and second-placed teams in their group are taken into account, as stated in the Regulations Articles 15.01 and 15.02.

Pos	Grp	Team	Pld	W	D	L	GF	GA	GD	Pts	Qualification
1	10	Switzerland	2	1	0	1	1	7	−6	3	Elite round
2	2	Bulgaria	2	0	1	1	2	3	−1	1	
3	4	Israel	2	0	1	1	3	5	−2	1	
4	1	Republic of Ireland	2	0	0	2	2	5	−3	0	
5	8	Lithuania	2	0	0	2	1	4	−3	0	
6	7	Iceland	2	0	0	2	2	6	−4	0	
7	6	Georgia	2	0	0	2	1	5	−4	0	
8	11	North Macedonia	2	0	0	2	1	5	−4	0	
9	3	Belarus	2	0	0	2	0	4	−4	0	
10	13	Azerbaijan	2	0	0	2	1	7	−6	0	
11	5	Montenegro	2	0	0	2	0	6	−6	0	
12	9	Moldova	2	0	0	2	1	10	−9	0	
13	12	Kosovo	2	0	0	2	0	9	−9	0	

Source: UEFA
Rules for classification: 1) points; 2) goal difference; 3) goals scored; 4) disciplinary points; 5) coefficient; 6) drawing of lots.

== Elite round ==
=== Draw ===
The draw for the Elite round was held on 10 December 2025 at 11:00 CET at the UEFA headquarters in Nyon, Switzerland.

The teams were seeded according to their results in the Qualifying round. Spain, which received a bye to the Elite round, were automatically seeded to the top position in Pot 1. Each group contains one team from Pot 1, one team from Pot 2, one team from Pot 3, and one team from Pot 4. Winners and runners-up from the same Qualifying round group could not be drawn in the same group, but the best third-placed team could be drawn in the same group as winners or runners-up from the same Qualifying round group.

To determine this ranking, the results against the teams in fourth place were discarded and the following criteria were applied (Regulations Articles 15.01 and 15.02):

1. Position in a Qualifying round group
2. Points
3. Goal difference
4. Goals scored
5. Disciplinary points
6. UEFA coefficient ranking for the Qualifying round draw

Teams entering Elite round
Pos	Grp	Team	RQ	Pld	Pts	GD	GS	DP	Coeff	Seeding
1	Bye	Spain	—	—	—	—	—			Pot 1
2	13	Czech Republic	1st	2	6	9	10			Pot 1
3	9	Italy	1st	2	6	9	9	3		Pot 1
4	8	England	1st	2	6	9	9	4		Pot 1
5	12	Germany	1st	2	6	6	7			Pot 1
6	5	Ukraine	1st	2	6	6	6			Pot 1
7	6	Croatia	1st	2	6	5	6			Pot 1
8	1	Netherlands	1st	2	6	3	6			Pot 2
9	4	Austria	1st	2	6	3	4	6		Pot 2
10	3	Turkey	1st	2	6	3	4	7		Pot 2
11	2	France	1st	2	6	2	4			Pot 2
12	11	Portugal	1st	2	4	3	5			Pot 2
13	7	Romania	1st	2	4	3	4			Pot 2
14	10	Denmark	1st	2	3	6	7			Pot 2
15	7	Finland	2nd	2	4	1	4			Pot 3
16	11	Belgium	2nd	2	4	1	2			Pot 3
17	12	Norway	2nd	2	3	3	5			Pot 3
18	3	Greece	2nd	2	3	1	3			Pot 3
19	5	Slovakia	2nd	2	3	0	3			Pot 3
20	9	Poland	2nd	2	3	0	2	2		Pot 3
21	1	Kazakhstan	2nd	2	3	0	2	7		Pot 3
22	10	Sweden	2nd	2	3	0	1			Pot 4
23	6	Serbia	2nd	2	3	−1	4			Pot 4
24	13	Northern Ireland	2nd	2	3	−3	1			Pot 4
25	8	Latvia	2nd	2	3	−6	2			Pot 4
26	2	Hungary	2nd	2	1	−1	2	6	8.333	Pot 4
27	4	Slovenia	2nd	2	1	−1	2	6	7.333	Pot 4
28	10	Switzerland	3rd	2	3	−6	1			Pot 4

Times are CET (UTC+1) as listed by UEFA (local times, if different, are in parentheses).

=== Group 1 ===
Pos	Team	Pld	W	D	L	GF	GA	GD	Pts	Qualification
1	Germany (H)	3	2	1	0	6	4	+2	7	Final tournament
2	Austria	3	1	1	1	6	4	+2	4	
3	Greece	3	0	2	1	3	4	−1	2	
4	Sweden	3	0	2	1	4	7	−3	2	

Source: UEFA
Rules for classification: Tiebreakers
(H) Hosts
25 March 2026
12:00

Greece	1–1	Austria
Tsigkas 3'	Report	Adejenughure 27'

DFB-Campus, Frankfurt am Main
Attendance: 123
Referee: Bulat Sariyev (Kazakhstan)
25 March 2026
18:00

Germany	2–2	Sweden
Stange 36'; Culbreath 80'	Report	Lahdo 68'; Geiger 90+5'

Sportpark Dreieich, Dreieich
Attendance: 895
Referee: Sam Barrott (England)

28 March 2026
12:00

Austria	3–0	Sweden
Hämmerle 27' (pen.); Fidjeu-Tazemeta 62'; Music 90+3'	Report

DFB-Campus, Frankfurt am Main
Attendance: 102
Referee: Antoni Bandić (Bosnia and Herzegovina)
28 March 2026
18:00

Germany	1–0	Greece
Onyeka 84'	Report

Sportpark Dreieich, Dreieich
Attendance: 1,476
Referee: Bulat Sariyev (Kazakhstan)

31 March 2026
18:00

Austria	2–3	Germany
Music 45+1'; Djordjevic 90+4'	Report	Stange 15', 33'; Onyeka 44'

Sportpark Dreieich, Dreieich
Attendance: 1,195
Referee: Sam Barrott (England)
31 March 2026
18:00

Sweden	2–2	Greece
Arrhov 12'; Öhman 65'	Report	Mythou 36', 73'

DFB-Campus, Frankfurt am Main
Attendance: 45
Referee: Antoni Bandić (Bosnia and Herzegovina)

=== Group 2 ===
Pos	Team	Pld	W	D	L	GF	GA	GD	Pts	Qualification
1	Serbia	3	2	1	0	4	1	+3	7	Final tournament
2	England	3	2	0	1	7	2	+5	6	
3	Portugal (H)	3	1	1	1	2	7	−5	4	
4	Poland	3	0	0	3	0	3	−3	0	

Source: UEFA
Rules for classification: Tiebreakers
(H) Hosts
25 March 2026
12:00

England	0–2	Serbia
	Report	Cvetković 39'; Kostić 65'

Pista de Atletismo Gémeos Castro, Guimarães
Attendance: 124
Referee: Jacob Karlsen (Denmark)
25 March 2026
17:00

Poland	0–1	Portugal
	Report	Rodrigues 60'

Estádio Amélia Morais, Braga
Attendance: 537
Referee: Christian-Petru Ciorchica (Austria)

28 March 2026
12:00

England	1–0	Poland
Mheuka 86'	Report

Pista de Atletismo Gémeos Castro, Guimarães
Attendance: 159
Referee: Jacob Karlsen (Denmark)
28 March 2026
17:00

Portugal	1–1	Serbia
Lima 4'	Report	Milosavljević 55'

Estádio Municipal de Famalicão, Vila Nova de Famalicão
Attendance: 680
Referee: Amine Kourgheli (Belarus)

31 March 2026
17:00

Portugal	0–6	England
	Report	Derry 4', 60'; Dowman 50'; Mayers 75'; Mheuka 85'; Howell 88'

Estádio Amélia Morais, Braga
Attendance: 1,234
Referee: Christian-Petru Ciorchica (Austria)
31 March 2026
17:00

Serbia	1–0	Poland
Cvetković 77'	Report

Estádio Municipal de Fafe, Fafe
Attendance: 51
Referee: Amine Kourgheli (Belarus)

=== Group 3 ===
Pos	Team	Pld	W	D	L	GF	GA	GD	Pts	Qualification
1	Croatia (H)	3	2	1	0	6	2	+4	7	Final tournament
2	France	3	1	2	0	5	4	+1	5	
3	Switzerland	3	1	0	2	4	7	−3	3	
4	Norway	3	0	1	2	3	5	−2	1	

Source: UEFA
Rules for classification: Tiebreakers
(H) Hosts
25 March 2026
12:00

Croatia	4–1	Switzerland
Puljić 11'; Čović 69'; Barić 76'; Smiljanić 90+5'	Report	Camara 68'

Stadion Varteks, Varaždin
Attendance: 300
Referee: Oliver Reitala (Finland)
25 March 2026
15:15

Norway	2–2	France
Håland 36'; Norbye 67'	Report	Riise 16' (o.g.); Detourbet 77' (pen.)

Town stadium, Vrbovec
Attendance: 200
Referee: Ben Mcmaster (Northern Ireland)

28 March 2026
12:00

Croatia	1–0	Norway
Barić 20'	Report

Stadion Varteks, Varaždin
Attendance: 362
Referee: Damian Kos (Poland)
28 March 2026
15:15

France	2–1	Switzerland
Molebe 35', 64'	Report	Vasovic 87'

Town stadium, Vrbovec
Attendance: 225
Referee: Oliver Reitala (Finland)

31 March 2026
12:00

France	1–1	Croatia
Molebe 68'	Report	Smiljanić 56'

Stadion Varteks, Varaždin
Attendance: 354
Referee: Ben Mcmaster (Northern Ireland)
31 March 2026
12:00

Switzerland	2–1	Norway
Parra 6'; White 83'	Report	Nilsen-Modebe 54'

Town stadium, Vrbovec
Attendance: 80
Referee: Damian Kos (Poland)

=== Group 4 ===
Pos	Team	Pld	W	D	L	GF	GA	GD	Pts	Qualification
1	Denmark	3	2	1	0	5	1	+4	7	Final tournament
2	Belgium	3	1	1	1	2	2	0	4	
3	Czech Republic (H)	3	1	0	2	4	3	+1	3	
4	Latvia	3	1	0	2	2	7	−5	3	

Source: UEFA
Rules for classification: Tiebreakers
(H) Hosts
25 March 2026
14:00

Czech Republic	3–0	Latvia
Dvořáček 48'; Moudrý 64' (pen.); Frýdl 66'	Report

Stadion Za Místním nádražím, Prostějov
Attendance: 687
Referee: Aleko Aptsiauri (Georgia)
25 March 2026
17:00

Belgium	0–0	Denmark
	Report

Stadion Jožky Silného, Kroměříž
Attendance: 155
Referee: Ivar Orri Kristjansson (Iceland)

28 March 2026
14:00

Czech Republic	0–1	Belgium
	Report	Furo 60'

Stadion Za Místním nádražím, Prostějov
Attendance: 725
Referee: João Gonçalves (Portugal)
28 March 2026
17:00

Denmark	3–0	Latvia
Søndergaard 18'; Rasmussen 61'; Martin 69'	Report

Stadion Jožky Silného, Kroměříž
Attendance: 138
Referee: Aleko Aptsiauri (Georgia)

31 March 2026
14:00

Denmark	2–1	Czech Republic
Højer 61'; Ambæk 80'	Report	Dvořáček 31'

Stadion Za Místním nádražím, Prostějov
Attendance: 438
Referee: João Gonçalves (Portugal)
31 March 2026
14:00

Latvia	2–1	Belgium
Kļavinskis 84'; Kukulis 86'	Report	Furo 90'

Stadion Jožky Silného, Kroměříž
Attendance: 70
Referee: Ivar Orri Kristjansson (Iceland)

=== Group 5 ===
Pos	Team	Pld	W	D	L	GF	GA	GD	Pts	Qualification
1	Ukraine	3	2	1	0	5	1	+4	7	Final tournament
2	Northern Ireland	3	1	1	1	1	1	0	4	
3	Kazakhstan	3	1	0	2	2	4	−2	3	
4	Romania (H)	3	0	2	1	1	3	−2	2	

Source: UEFA
Rules for classification: Tiebreakers
(H) Hosts
25 March 2026
10:00

Ukraine	1–0	Northern Ireland
Soroka 47'	Report

Football Centre FRF, Buftea
Attendance: 0
Referee: Lukasz Kuzma (Poland)
25 March 2026
16:00

Kazakhstan	2–0	Romania
Toleukhan 13'; Tuyakbayev 66'	Report

Anghel Iordănescu Stadium, Voluntari
Attendance: 100
Referee: Philip Farrugia (Malta)

28 March 2026
10:00

Ukraine	3–0	Kazakhstan
Tyutyunov 44'; Kamenskyi 72'; Bohdanov 85'	Report

Football Centre FRF, Buftea
Attendance: 50
Referee: Joey Kooij (The Netherlands)
28 March 2026
15:30

Romania	0–0	Northern Ireland
	Report

Concordia Stadium, Chiajna
Attendance: 200
Referee: Lukasz Kuzma (Poland)

31 March 2026
16:00

Romania	1–1	Ukraine
Toma 26'	Report	Kamenskyi 85'

Anghel Iordănescu Stadium, Voluntari
Attendance: 123
Referee: Joey Kooij (The Netherlands)
31 March 2026
16:00

Northern Ireland	1–0	Kazakhstan
O'Neill 56' (pen.)	Report

Football Centre FRF, Buftea
Attendance: 50
Referee: Philip Farrugia (Malta)

=== Group 6 ===
Pos	Team	Pld	W	D	L	GF	GA	GD	Pts	Qualification
1	Italy (H)	3	2	1	0	7	1	+6	7	Final tournament
2	Turkey	3	2	1	0	5	3	+2	7	
3	Hungary	3	1	0	2	6	8	−2	3	
4	Slovakia	3	0	0	3	2	8	−6	0	

Source: UEFA
Rules for classification: Tiebreakers
(H) Hosts
25 March 2026
12:00

Slovakia	0–1	Turkey
	Report	Aslan 39'

Real Cosenza, Cosenza
Attendance: 58
Referee: Danilo Nikolić (Serbia)
25 March 2026
17:00

Italy	3–0	Hungary
Iddrissou 44', 78'; Comotto 85'	Report

Stadio Nicola Ceravolo, Catanzaro
Attendance: 3,680
Referee: Bastien Dechepy (France)

28 March 2026
12:00

Turkey	3–2	Hungary
Luş 4', 33'; Yaşar 41'	Report	Mondovics 51'; Kovács 90+3'

Real Cosenza, Cosenza
Attendance: 250
Referee: Bastien Dechepy (France)
28 March 2026
17:00

Italy	3–0	Slovakia
Mosconi 37'; Liberali 45+1'; Coletta 72'	Report

Stadio San Vito-Gigi Marulla, Cosenza
Attendance: 2,956
Referee: Gustavo Correia (Portugal)

31 March 2026
15:00

Turkey	1–1	Italy
Soylu 62'	Report	Inacio 33'

Stadio Nicola Ceravolo, Catanzaro
Attendance: 2,054
Referee: Danilo Nikolić (Serbia)
31 March 2026
15:00

Hungary	4–2	Slovakia
Mondovics 13', 62'; Bodnar 56'; Szép 74'	Report	Blaško 6'; Kováčik 86'

Real Cosenza, Cosenza
Attendance: 47
Referee: Gustavo Correia (Portugal)

=== Group 7 ===
Pos	Team	Pld	W	D	L	GF	GA	GD	Pts	Qualification
1	Spain (H)	3	3	0	0	11	0	+11	9	Final tournament
2	Netherlands	3	2	0	1	5	4	+1	6	
3	Finland	3	1	0	2	1	7	−6	3	
4	Slovenia	3	0	0	3	1	7	−6	0	

Source: UEFA
Rules for classification: Tiebreakers
(H) Hosts
25 March 2026
15:00

Finland	0–3	Netherlands
	Report	Van den Elshout 78', 87', 90+2'

Estadi Olímpic Camilo Cano, La Nucía
Attendance: 430
Referee: Tim Marshall (Northern Ireland)
25 March 2026
18:00

Spain	4–0	Slovenia
Yáñez 31' (pen.); Aguado 78'; Diallo 86'; López 89'	Report

Estadio Municipal Guillermo Amor, Benidorm
Attendance: 2,900
Referee: Bence Csonka (Hungary)

28 March 2026
15:00

Netherlands	2–1	Slovenia
Vianello 35'; Bahaty 83'	Report	Milojević 53'

Campo Municipal Antonio Solana, Alicante
Attendance: 332
Referee: Tim Marshall (Northern Ireland)
28 March 2026
18:00

Spain	4–0	Finland
Yáñez 58'; López 62', 73'; Morante 88' (pen.)	Report

Estadio Municipal Guillermo Amor, Benidorm
Attendance: 4,390
Referee: Mikkel Redder (Denmark)

31 March 2026
18:00

Netherlands	0–3	Spain
	Report	Salinas 56'; López 74'; Diallo 89'

Estadio Municipal Guillermo Amor, Benidorm
Attendance: 6,854
Referee: Mikkel Redder (Denmark)
31 March 2026
18:00

Slovenia	0–1	Finland
	Report	Daldum 7'

Estadio José Rico Pérez, Alicante
Attendance: 217
Referee: Bence Csonka (Hungary)

== Goalscorers ==
In the Qualifying round, there have been 258 goals scored in 78 matches, for an average of 3.31 goals per match (as of 18 November 2025).

In the Elite round, there have been 110 goals scored in 42 matches, for an average of 2.62 goals per match (as of 31 March 2026).

In total, there have been 368 goals scored in 120 matches, for an average of 3.07 goals per match (as of 31 March 2026).

8 goals

- (Germany) Francis Onyeka

7 goals

- (Greece) Anestis Mythou

6 goals

- (Czech Republic) Louis Buffon
- (England) Shumaira Mheuka
- (Netherlands) Tobias van den Elshout

5 goals

- (Austria) Mauro Hämmerle
- (England) Jesse Derry

4 goals

- (Finland) Rudi Vikström
- (Germany) Otto Stange
- (Norway) Sean Nilsen-Modebe
- (Spain) Hugo López
- (Ukraine) Oleksandr Kamenskyi

3 goals

- (Austria) Adrian Riegel
- (Croatia) Luka Vrzić
- (France) Enzo Molebe
- (Germany) Alessandro Gaul Souza
- (Hungary) Kevin Mondovics
- (Poland) Fabian Bzdyl
- (Romania) Mihai Toma
- (Romania) Troy Tomșa
- (Serbia) Mihajlo Cvetković
- (Switzerland) Andrej Vasovic
- (Turkey) Darvin Soylu

2 goals

- (Andorra) Cesar Gonzalez Garcia
- (Austria) Oghenetejiri Adejenughure
- (Austria) Ensar Music
- (Azerbaijan) Shahismayil Jafarov
- (Belarus) Artyom Akatov
- (Belgium) Kaye Furo
- (Croatia) Ivan Barić
- (Croatia) Lovro Chelfi
- (Croatia) Ljubo Puljić
- (Croatia) Karlo Mijo Šimić
- (Croatia) Pavle Smiljanić
- (Czech Republic) Lukáš Dvořáček
- (Czech Republic) Jiří Míček
- (Czech Republic) Ondřej Penxa
- (Denmark) Jacob Ambæk
- (Denmark) Olti Hyseni
- (Denmark) Sofus Johannesen
- (Denmark) William Martin
- (Denmark) Valdemar Møller
- (Denmark) Hjalte Boe Rasmussen
- (England) Divine Mukasa
- (England) Chris Rigg
- (France) Nadir El Jamali
- (Germany) Montrell Culbreath
- (Greece) Georgios Sokos
- (Greece) Matthaios Tsigkas
- (Hungary) Simon Bodnar
- (Hungary) Bendegúz Kovács
- (Hungary) Hunor Németh
- (Iceland) Viktor Daðason
- (Iceland) Gunnar Orri Olsen
- (Israel) Yoav Solel
- (Italy) Alessandro Ciardi
- (Italy) Federico Coletta
- (Italy) Jamal Iddrissou
- (Italy) Mattia Mosconi
- (Kazakhstan) Azamat Tuyakbayev
- (Latvia) Roberts Kukulis
- (Malta) Dejan Farrugia
- (Netherlands) Manuel Bahaty
- (Netherlands) Ayodele Thomas
- (North Macedonia) Emir Sabotikj
- (Norway) Alexander Røssing-Lelesiit
- (Norway) Oskar Spiten-Nysæter
- (Portugal) Rui Silva
- (Serbia) Srđan Borovina
- (Serbia) Uroš Djorđević I
- (Slovenia) Mateo Aćimović
- (Slovenia) David Pejičić
- (Spain) Ousmane Diallo
- (Spain) Daniel Yáñez
- (Sweden) Kevin Filling
- (Sweden) Yannick Geiger
- (Turkey) Onuralp Çakiroğlu
- (Turkey) Berat Luş
- (Turkey) Özder Özcan
- (Turkey) Tugra Turhan
- (Ukraine) Dmytro Bohdanov
- (Ukraine) Bohdan Popov
- (Ukraine) Bohdan Redushko

1 goal

- (Austria) Aleksandar Djordjevic
- (Austria) Thierry Fidjeu-Tazemeta
- (Azerbaijan) Nadir Orujov
- (Belarus) Artem Grabtsevich
- (Belarus) Bogdan Gusev
- (Belarus) Yegor Molchan
- (Belgium) Lino Decresson
- (Belgium) Yanis Musuayi
- (Belgium) Jakke Van Britsom
- (Bosnia and Herzegovina) Rijad Telalović
- (Bulgaria) Marto Boychev
- (Bulgaria) Filip Gigov
- (Bulgaria) Georgi Penev
- (Bulgaria) Stivan Stoyanchov
- (Bulgaria) Simeon Tsanev
- (Croatia) Marko Aščić
- (Croatia) Tomas Baković
- (Croatia) Patrice Čović
- (Croatia) Bruno Durdov
- (Croatia) Anđelo Šutalo
- (Croatia) Karlo Zulfić
- (Cyprus) Giorgos Tziortzis
- (Czech Republic) Tadeáš Frýdl
- (Czech Republic) Lukáš Moudrý
- (Czech Republic) Adam Sosna
- (Czech Republic) Daniel Švancara
- (Denmark) Julius Emefile
- (Denmark) Victor Gustafsen
- (Denmark) Alfred Gøthler
- (Denmark) Oliver Højer
- (Denmark) Gustav Schjøtt
- (Denmark) Philip Søndergaard
- (England) Max Dowman
- (England) Jack Fletcher
- (England) Harry Howell (footballer)
- (England) Ezra Mayers
- (England) Rio Ngumoha
- (Estonia) Trevor Hint
- (Estonia) Maksimilian Skvortsov
- (Finland) Sonosi Daldum
- (France) Joel Emmanuel Coulibaly
- (France) Mathys Detourbet
- (France) Tidiane Devernois
- (France) Luan Gadegbeku
- (France) Enzo Kana-Biyik
- (France) Khalis Merah
- (France) Propser Peter
- (Georgia (country)) Halid Doltmourziev
- (Georgia (country)) Saba Nioradze
- (Germany) Luca Erlein
- (Germany) Adin Licina
- (Germany) Mick Schmetgens
- (Greece) Bedri Dunga
- (Greece) Zois Karargyris
- (Greece) Georgios Kosidis
- (Hungary) Barna Pál
- (Hungary) Márton Szép
- (Iceland) Daníel Johannesson
- (Israel) Ilay Ben Simon
- (Italy) Alessio Cacciamani
- (Italy) Filippo Cerpelletti
- (Italy) Matteo Cocchi
- (Italy) Christian Comotto
- (Italy) Javison Idele
- (Italy) Samuele Inacio
- (Italy) Mattia Liberali
- (Italy) Emanuele Sala
- (Kazakhstan) Mansur Birkurmanov
- (Kazakhstan) Aldiyar Nurgali
- (Kazakhstan) Abylay Toleukhan
- (Kosovo) Lirjon Abdullahu
- (Kosovo) Rin Ahmeti
- (Kosovo) Albert Rrahmani
- (Latvia) Marats Gaļajevs
- (Latvia) Helvijs Joksts
- (Latvia) Rūdolfs Kļavinskis
- (Latvia) Matīss Siliņš
- (Lithuania) Nedas Garbaliauskas
- (Lithuania) Skirmantas Paukštys
- (Lithuania) Dominykas Taučas
- (Luxembourg) Alexandre Tavares Dos Santos
- (Malta) Jake Borg
- (Moldova) Vadim Bejenaru
- (Moldova) Nichita Caragheorghi
- (Montenegro) Matija Jovanović
- (Netherlands) Demiane Agustien
- (Netherlands) Joël van den Berg
- (Netherlands) Eser Gürbüz
- (Netherlands) Nassim El Harmouz
- (Netherlands) Jinairo Johnson
- (Netherlands) Shane Kluivert
- (Netherlands) Luca Messori
- (Netherlands) Giannino Vianello
- (Northern Ireland) Braiden Graham
- (Northern Ireland) Ceadach O'Neill
- (Northern Ireland) James Simpson
- (North Macedonia) Admir Latifi
- (Norway) Kristian Skurve Håland
- (Norway) Jonathan Norbye
- (Norway) Markus Edner Wæhler
- (Norway) Liam West
- (Poland) Kamil Jakóbczyk
- (Portugal) Flávio Gonçalves
- (Portugal) Bernardo Lima
- (Portugal) Afonso Patrão
- (Portugal) Rodrigo Prata Deusdado Rodrigues
- (Portugal) Duarte Soares
- (Portugal) João Trovisco
- (Republic of Ireland) Adam Brennan
- (Republic of Ireland) Alfie Lynskey
- (Republic of Ireland) Taylor McCarthy
- (Romania) Florin Gașpăr
- (Romania) Ștefan Senciuc
- (Romania) Alexandru Stoian
- (Scotland) Tyler Fletcher
- (Scotland) Josh Landers
- (Scotland) Owen Stirton
- (Serbia) Aleksa Damjanović
- (Serbia) Bogdan Kostić
- (Serbia) Vasilije Kostov
- (Serbia) Veljko Milosavljević
- (Serbia) Luka Zarić
- (Slovakia) Karol Blaško
- (Slovakia) Samuel Kováčik
- (Slovakia) Samuel Lusale
- (Slovakia) Denis Valko
- (Slovakia) Šimon Vlna
- (Slovenia) Benjamin Adrović
- (Slovenia) Nemanja Milojević
- (Spain) Diego Aguado
- (Spain) José Antonio Morante
- (Spain) Salinas
- (Sweden) Love Arrhov
- (Sweden) Adrian Lahdo
- (Sweden) Filip Öhman
- (Switzerland) Sambou Camara
- (Switzerland) David Da Silva
- (Switzerland) Ivan Parra
- (Switzerland) Elio Rufener
- (Switzerland) Lou William Marley White
- (Turkey) Berkay Aslan
- (Turkey) Hasan Hüseyin Bulut
- (Turkey) Hüseyin Maldar
- (Turkey) Talha Özdemir
- (Turkey) Eyyüb Arda Yaşar
- (Ukraine) Kyrylo Dihtyar
- (Ukraine) Oleksandr Soroka
- (Ukraine) Vladyslav Tyutyunov

1 own goal

- (Israel) Noam Sztejfman (against Slovenia)
- (Norway) Fillip Jenssen Riise (against France)
- (Slovakia) Dominik Balog (against Ukraine)
