= 2019−20 Coppa Italia Serie D =

Tournament details
- Country: Italy
- Date: 18 August 2019 – 12 February 2020
- Teams: 176

The 2019−20 Coppa Italia Serie D was the 21st edition of Coppa Italia Serie D. Due to the COVID-19 pandemic in Italy, on 20 May 2020, Lega Nazionale Dilettanti decided not to complete the competition.

== Format ==
All rounds of the event, with the exception of the semi-finals, are a single-match direct elimination. For these matches, in the event of a draw at the end of the 90 minute regulation time, penalty shootout is used to determine the winning team (no extra time is played). The home factor is determined by drawing lots in the preliminary round, in the first round and in round 64. In the round of 32, in the round of 16 and in the quarter-finals, however, the team that played away in the previous round plays at home. The other way around, proceeding with the draw only in the case of a match between two teams that have both played at home, or both away, in the previous round, the final is instead played at a neutral ground. The semi-finals are organized in home and away matches, with a draw to determine the order of the fields and with the application of the away goal rule. In the return matches there are no extra times but direct penalties in the event of a score that determines a draw in both overall goals and away goals. The match schedule is guided by criteria of geographical proximity.

== Calendar ==
The calendar of the competition was announced on 6 August 2019.

Phase	Round	Teams involved in the round	First leg	Second leg
Preliminary rounds	Preliminary round	94 → 47	18 August 2019 – 11 September 2019	
Preliminary rounds	First round	110 → 55	24 August 2019 – 2 October 2019	
Final stage	Round of 64	64 → 32	18 September 2019 – 9 October 2019	
Final stage	Round of 32	32 → 16	9–30 October 2019	
Final stage	Round of 16	16 → 8	13–20 November 2019	
Final stage	Quarter-finals	8 → 4	4–11 December 2019	
Final stage	Semi-finals	4 → 2	29 January 2020	12 February 2020
Final stage	Final	2 → 1	Not played	

== Preliminary Round ==
Ties were played between 18 August 2019 and 11 September 2019

They participated in the round:

- 36 teams promoted from 2018−19 Eccellenza
- 18 winners of 2018–19 Serie D Relegation play-out
- teams that avoided relegation by <8 points
- 26 clubs ranked at the end of the 2018–19 Serie D in twelfth, eleventh and tenth place in the related 18-team groups, thirteenth, twelfth and eleventh of the 19-team groups, fourteenth, thirteenth and twelfth in the 20-team groups
- 4 supernumerary teams (Palermo, Lucchese, Arzachena and Foggia)
- 2 teams with worst scores Coppa Disciplina C.U. n.166 del 27/6/2019

Tie no	Home team	Score	Away team
1.	Chions	5–1	San Luigi
2.	Tamai	1–1 (4–3 p)	Luparense
3.	Cartigliano	1–0	Belluno
4.	Amborosiana	0–0 (1–3 p)	Caldiero
5.	Vigasio	1–2	Villafranca
6.	Clodiense	0–0 (2–4 p)	Mestre
7.	Levico	1–0	Dro Alto Garda
8.	Cilivergo	2–2 (4–3 p)	Legnago
9.	Caravaggio	2–2 (4–2 p)	Scanzorosciate
10.	Tritium	0–1	Brusaporto
11.	Ponte San Pietro	0–1	NibionnOggiono
12.	Legnago	5–2	Castellanzese
13.	Calvina Sport	1–2	Breno
14.	Lavagnese	1–1 (4–5 p)	Fezzanese
15.	Borgosesia	1–0	Verbania
16.	Fossano	1–2	Vado
17.	Correggese	0–2	Lentigione
18.	Mezzolara	3–1	Alfonsine
19.	Forlì	3–0	Cattolica
20.	Scandicci	2–1	Progresso
21.	Sant'Elpidio	0–1	Tolentino
22.	Real Forte Querceta	0–1	Lucchese
23.	Sangiovannese	0–1	Grosseto
24.	Aglianese	3–4	Grassina
25.	Bastia	1–2	Foligno
26.	Avezzano	2–0	Real Giulianova
27.	Vastese	1–0	Chieri
28.	Olympia Agnonese	0–1	Vastogiraldi
29.	Torres	2–0	Arzachena
30.	Muravera	3–1	Budoni
31.	Ladispoli	1–1 (3–5 p)	'Flaminia
32.	Ostia Mare	1–1 (3–5 p)	Pomezia'
33.	P.C. Tor Sapienza	0–1	Team Nuova Florida
33.	Città di Anagni	3–0	Campobasso
35.	Gladiator	3–0	San Tommaso
36.	Gelbison	1–1 (4–1 p)	Agropoli
37.	Giuliano	1–2	Sorrento
38.	Nocerina	1–1 (4–1 p)	Nola
39.	Francavilla	4–0	Grumentum Val d'Agri
40.	Nardò	3–3 (4–3 p)	Casarano
41.	Rocella	0–1	Corigliano Calabro
42.	Palmese	0–1	Messina F.C.
43.	Marina di Ragusa	1–0	Messina
44.	Licata	3–0	Troina
45.	Milano City	1–2	Arconatese
46.	Brindisi	0–1	Foggia
47.	Palermo	1–1 (3–5 p)	Biancavilla

== First Round ==
Ties were played between 24 August 2019 and 2 October 2019

They participated in the round:

- 47 teams winner of preliminary round
- 63 teams, who give a bye for the preliminary round

Tie no	Home team	Score	Away team
1.	Cjarlins Muzane	3–4	Chions
2.	Folgore Caratese	1–1 (3–2 p)	Legnano
3.	Sammaurese	1–3	Scandicci
4.	Castrovillari	0–2	Francavilla
5.	Campodarsego	4–3	Tamai
6.	Cartigliano	1–1 (3–5 p)	Montebelluna
7.	Caldiero	1–1 (1–3 p)	Villafranca
8.	Rovigo	2–2 (1–3 p)	Mestre
9.	Virtus Bolzano	3–1	Levico
10.	Union Feltre	2–1	A.C. Este
11.	Inveruno	1–1 (5–3 p)	Arconatese
12.	Virtus Bergamo	0–1	Brusaporto
13.	NibionnOggiono	1–2	Caravaggia
14.	Ciliverghe	6–2	Breno
15.	Sanremese	0–2	Seregno
16.	Sporting Franciacorta	2–2 (4–5 p)	Pro Sesto
17.	Sondrio	1–1 (2–3 p)	Villa d'Almè
18.	Crema	1–0	Fiorenzuola
19.	Savona	1–1 (4–2 p)	Fezzanese
20.	Ligorna	2–0	Vado
21.	Casale	0–0 (5–4 p)	Borgosesia
22.	Chieri	2–1	Bra
23.	Vigor Carpaneto	2–1	Lentigione
24.	Sasso Marconi Zola	0–1	Mezzolara
25.	Savignanese	2–0	Forlì
26.	Grosseto	4–1	Aquila
27.	Seravezza	3–0	Ghivizzano
28.	Gavorrano	2–3	San Donato Tavarnelle
29.	Lucchese	2–3	Grassina
30.	Tuttocuoio	3–2	Prato
31.	A. C. Sangiustese	2–0	Jesina
32.	Foligno	1–1 (2–3 p)	Tolentino
33.	Recanatese	2–3	Montegiorgio
34.	Trestina	2–3	Cannara
35.	Torres	1–1 (4–3 p)	Latte Dolce
36.	Ostia	2–0	Muraverra
37.	Trastevere	2–2 (5–4 p)	Team Nuova Florida
38.	Monterosi	2–1	Flaminia
39.	Latina	2–3	Aprilia
40.	Albalonga	1–2	Vis Artena
41.	Atletico Terme Fiuggi	1–0	Città di Agnani
42.	Pineto	0–0 (4–2 p)	Vastese
43.	San Nicolò Notaresco	1–2	Avezzano
44.	Cassino	2–3	Vastogiraldi
45.	Sorrento	2–0	Gladiator
46.	Portici	1–0	Nocerina
47.	Savoia	2–0	Gelbison
48.	Taranto	1–0	Team Altamura
49.	Foggia	0–0 (4–3 p)	Nardò
50.	Fidelis Andria	2–2 (5–4 p)	Bitonto
51.	Cittanovese	1–0	Corigliano
52.	F.C. Messina	2–1	Marina di Ragusa
53.	Acireale	2–0	Licata
54.	Audace Cerignola	2–0	Gravina
55.	Biancavilla	1–3	Marsala

== Round of 64 ==
Ties were played between 18 September 2019 and 9 October 2019.

18 September 2019	Messina F.C.	2–0	Cittanovese	Messina
15:00 CEST	Bevis 19'; Aladje 26' (pen.)	Report		Stadium: Stadio San Filippo; Referee: Ubaldi (Rome)

25 September 2019	Atletico Terme Fiuggi	1–2	Portici	Fiuggi
15:00 CEST	Moriconi 6'	Report	Scala 26'; Corratella 45'	Stadium: Stadio San Filippo; Referee: Renzi (Pesaro)

25 September 2019	Brusaporto	1–1 (4–3 p)	Villa d'Almè	Brusaporto
15:00 CEST	Galelli 34'	Report	Micheletti 62'	Stadium: Centro sportivo comunale Referee: Turrini (Florence)
	Penalties
	Forlani (penalty scored); Vitali (penalty missed); Villa (penalty scored); Spampatti (penalty scored); Cortinovis (penalty scored)		(penalty scored) Sonzogni; (penalty missed) Ghisalberti; (penalty scored) Crotti; (penalty scored) Del Carro; (penalty missed) Gritti

25 September 2019	Chieri	3–0	Ligoma	Chieri
15:00 CEST	Yeboah 32', 36'; Di Lorenzo 53'	Report		Stadium: Stadio Pieri De Paola; Referee: Molinaroli (Piacenza)

25 September 2019	Chions	0–3	Campodarsego	Chions
15:00 CEST		Report	Acron 1', 17' (pen.), 51'	Stadium: Stadio Francesco Tesolin; Referee: Grassi (Forlì)

25 September 2019	Folgore Caratese	2–0	Caravaggio	Carate Brianza
15:00 CEST	Valotti 5'; Ferrari 85'	Report		Stadium: Stadio XXV Aprile; Referee: Delnotaro (Verbano-Cusio-Ossola)

25 September 2019	Grassina	2–1	Scandicci	Bagno a Ripoli
15:00 CEST	Baccini 44' (pen.); Bruni 60' (pen.)	Report	Colombini 89'	Stadium: Stadio comunale Referee: Taricone (Perugia)

25 September 2019	Mantova	3–4	Clivergne Mazzano	Mantova
15:00 CEST	Mascari 64', 82'; D'Iglio 87' (pen.)	Report	Confalorieri 19' (pen.), 53'; Coulibaly 58'; De Angelis 79'	Stadium: Stadio Danilo Martinelli; Referee: Schiavon (Treviso)

25 September 2019	Mestre	0–0 (1–4 p)	Adriese	Mestre
15:00 CEST		Report		Stadium: Stadio Francesco Baracca; Referee: Sassano (Padua)
	Penalties
	Chin (penalty missed); Poletto (penalty scored); Servegnini (penalty missed)		(penalty scored) Beltrame; (penalty scored) Meneghello; (penalty scored) Pagan; (penalty scored) Lauria

25 September 2019	Mezzolara	1–0	Vigor Carpaneto	Budrio
15:00 CEST	Negri 64'	Report		Stadium: Stadio Pietro Zucchini; Referee: Villa (Rimini)

25 September 2019	Montegiorgio	2–1	Sangiustese	Montegiorgio
15:00 CET	Djwomo 11'; Tempestili 47'	Report	Palladino 10'	Stadium: Stadio Tamburini; Referee: Gregori (Pescara)
Note: Tie reversed from the original draw

25 September 2019	San Donato Tavarnelle	1–1 (4–3 p)	Monterosi	Barberino Tavarnelle
15:00 CEST	Disanto 62'	Report	Roberti 9'	Stadium: Stadio Leonardo Pianigiani; Referee: Negrelli (Finale d'Emilia)
	Penalties
	Disanto (penalty scored); Giordani (penalty scored); Brenna (penalty scored); Zuppardi (penalty scored)		(penalty scored) Simoncelli; (penalty scored) Persicini; (penalty scored) Petti; (penalty missed) Costantino; (penalty missed) Marianeschi

25 September 2019	Sanremese	0–0 (4–2 p)	Savona	San Remo
15:00 CEST		Report		Stadium: Stadio Comunale; Referee: Lingamoorthy (Genoa)
	Penalties
	Taddei (penalty scored); Manes (penalty scored); Lo Bosco (penalty scored); Demontis (penalty scored)		(penalty missed) Buratto; (penalty scored) Lo Nigro; (penalty missed) Siani; (penalty scored) D'Ambrosio

25 September 2019	Savignanese	2–1	Matelica	Savignano sul Rubicone
15:00 CEST	Miori 32'; Luzzi 86'	Report	Tommasini 31'	Stadium: Stadio Giuseppe Carpanni; Referee: Ursini (Pescara)

25 September 2019	Seravezza	2–1	Grosseto	Seravezza
15:00 CEST	Lucaccini 18'; Podestà 78'	Report	Moscati 55'	Stadium: Stadio Buon Riposo; Referee: Bocchini (Rome)

25 September 2019	Seregno	4–1	Casale	Seregno
15:00 CEST	Fortunato 25' (pen.), 38' (pen.); Luoni 43'; Blazevic 44'	Report	Vilanova 10'	Stadium: Stadio Ferruccio; Referee: Baratta (Rossano)

25 September 2019	Trastevere	0–0 (3–5 p)	Ostia Mare	Rome
15:00 CEST		Report		Stadium: Trastevere Stadium; Referee: Campobasso (Formia)
	Penalties
	Sfanò (penalty scored); Neri (penalty scored); Capodaglio (penalty missed); Sannipoli (penalty scored)		(penalty scored) Vasco; (penalty scored) Ramacci; (penalty scored) D'Astolfo; (penalty scored) Esposito; (penalty scored) Renzetti

25 September 2019	Francavilla	2–0	Fasano	Francavilla in Sinni
15:30 CEST	Cavaliere 7'; Corvino 90+5' (pen.)	Report		Stadium: Stadio Nunzio Fittipaldi; Referee: Catanzaro (Catanzaro)

25 September 2019	Lanusei	0–2	Torres	Lanusei
16:00 CEST		Report	Milani 16', 56'	Stadium: Stadio Lixus; Referee: Cappai (Cagliari)

25 September 2019	Villafranca	1–1 (4–2 p)	Virtus Bolzano	Villafranca di Verona
16:30 CEST	Rizzon 64' (o.g.)	Report	Koni 28'	Stadium: Stadio Comunale; Referee: Santarossa (Pordenone)
	Penalties
	Andreis (penalty scored); Budic (penalty scored); Ambrosi (penalty scored); Borgogna (penalty scored)		(penalty scored) Timpone; (penalty missed) Forti; (penalty scored) Pinton; (penalty missed) Recedive

25 September 2019	Montebelluna	2–2 (4–5 p)	Feltre	Montebelluna
18:00 CEST	Zecchinato 36' (pen.); Fabbian 73'	Report	Bordin 11'; Veratti 48' (pen.)	Stadium: Stadio San Vigilo; Referee: Marin (Portuguaro)

25 September 2019	Pro Sesto	1–2	Inveruno	Sesto San Giovanni
18:00 CEST	Bettoni 75'	Report	Pastore 48'; Lillo 51'	Stadium: Stadio Ernesto Breda

25 September 2019	Aprilia	0–0 (4–3 p)	Vis Artena	Aprilia
18:30 CEST		Report		Stadium: Stadio Quinto Ricci; Referee: Perri (Rome)
	Penalties
	Corvi (penalty scored); Spano (penalty scored); Vitolo (penalty missed); Mattia (penalty scored); Fè (penalty scored)		(penalty missed) Paolacci; (penalty scored) Montesi; (penalty scored) D'Angeli; (penalty missed) Chinappi; (penalty scored) Del Gado

25 September 2019	Tolentino	3–1	Cannara	Tolentino
19:00 CEST	Minozzi 15'; Severoni 59'; Di Domenicantonio 62'	Report	Tucci 38'	Stadium: Stadio Della Vittoria; Referee: Marchioni (Rieti)

25 September 2019	Foggia	3–1	Vastogirardi	Foggia
20:00 CEST	Gentile 11'; Salines 15'; Iadaresta 60'	Report	Kyeremateng 31'	Stadium: Stadio Pino Zaccheria; Referee: Mastrodomenico (Policoro)

25 September 2019	Avezzano	0–1	Pineto	Avezzano
20:30 CEST		Report	Sarritzu 31'	Stadium: Stadio dei Marsi; Referee: Di Ciccio (Lanciano)

25 September 2019	Ponsacco	4–2	Tuttocuoio	Ponsacco
20:45 CET	Degl'Innocenti 1'; Papi 25' (pen.); Fornaciari 52'; Aufiero 66'	Report	Prete 47' (o.g.); Chicchiarelli 62'	Stadium: Stadio comunale Referee: Silvera (Valdarno)

2 October 2019	Turris	1–1 (4–2 p)	Sorrento	Gragnano
15:00 CEST	Celiento 55'	Report	Herrera 39'	Stadium: Stadio San Michele; Referee: Di Francesco (Olbia)
	Penalties
	Aliperta (penalty scored); Celiento (penalty missed); Riccio (penalty scored); Di Nunzio (penalty scored); Forte (penalty scored)		(penalty scored) Herrera; (penalty scored) Bonanno; (penalty missed) Cacace; (penalty missed) La Monica

2 October 2019	Crema	1–0	Fanfulla	Crema
20:30 CEST	Porcari 76'	Report		Stadium: Stadio Giuseppe Voltini; Referee: Gangi (Enna)

9 October 2019	Marsala	0–2	Acireale	Marsala
15:00 CEST		Report	Rizzo 81' (pen.), 84' (pen.)	Stadium: Stadio Antonino Lombardo Angotta; Referee: Iannello (Messina)

9 October 2019	Taranto	2–0	Audace	Taranto
15:00 CEST	Favetta 39'; Ouattara 90+3'	Report		Stadium: Stadio Erasmo Iacovone; Referee: Vergaro (Bari)

9 October 2019	Savoia	3–0	Fidelis Andria	Torre Annunziata
20:00 CEST	Gatto 23'; Cerone 76' (pen.), 90+2'	Report		Stadium: Stadio Alfredo Giraud; Referee: Angolari (Ostia)

== Round of 32 ==
Ties were played between 9 October 2019 and 30 October 2019.

9 October 2019	Campodarsego	2–1	Adriese	Campodarsego
15:00 CEST	Boscolo Bisto 6'; Acron 17'	Report	Pandiani 3'	Stadium: Stadio Comunale; Referee: Schiavon (Treviso)

9 October 2019	Crema	1–2	Seregno	Crema
15:00 CEST	Ferrari 54' (pen.)	Report	Blazeglio 14'; Nenadovic 34'	Stadium: Stadio Giuseppe Voltini; Referee: Gauzolino (Turin)

9 October 2019	Ciliverghe Mazzano	1–2	Folgore Caratese	Mazzano
15:00 CEST	Confalonieri 90+3'	Report	Graziano 19'; Bartulovic 35'	Stadium: Centro Sportivo Sterligarda; Referee: Agostoni (Milan)

9 October 2019	Inveruno	3–2	Brusaporto	Inveruno
15:00 CEST	Vanzano 10'; Vai 17'; Pastore 40'	Report	Vitali 47', 56'	Stadium: Stadio Luigino Garavaglia; Referee: Mallardi (Bari)

9 October 2019	Ponsacco	0–2	Seravezza	Ponsacco
15:00 CEST		Report	Giranoia 32'; Bonignomi 61'	Stadium: Stadio comunale Referee: Campazzo (Geona)

9 October 2019	Grassina	1–3	San Donato Tavarnelle	Bagno a Ripoli
15:00 CEST	Bruni 56' (pen.)	Report	Brenna 28'; Pino 50'; Masini 76'	Stadium: Stadio Comunale; Referee: Manzo (Torre Annunziata)

9 October 2019	Mezzolara	2–1	Savignanese	Budrio
15:00 CEST	Sala 8'; Negri 17'	Report	Luzzi 76'	Stadium: Stadio Pietro Zucchini; Referee: Campagni (Florence)

9 October 2019	Montegiorgio	0–2	Tolentino	Monte San Giusto
15:00 CEST		Report	Capezzani 1'; Severoni 55'	Stadium: Stadio Villa San Filippo; Referee: Silvestri (Rome)

9 October 2019	Chieri	0–3	Sanremo	Chieri
15:30 CEST		Report	De Montis 11', 38'; Likaxhiu 79'	Stadium: Stadio Piero De Paoli; Referee: Fichera (Milan)

9 October 2019	Pineto	1–0	Ostia Mare	Pineto
17:30 CEST	Ciarcelluti 17'	Report		Stadium: Stadio Piero De Paoli; Referee: Capriuolo (Bari)

9 October 2019	Union Feltre	2–0	Villafranca	Pedavena
20:00 CEST	Tonani 35' (pen.); Ravenane 73'	Report		Stadium: Stadio Boscherai; Referee: Galasso (Ciampino)

16 October 2019	Torres	3–0	Aprilia	Sassari
15:00 CEST	Sartor 23'; Milani 45+1'; Pintori 55'	Report		Stadium: Stadio Vanni Sanni; Referee: Diop (Treviglio)

16 October 2019	Foggia	3–1	Turris	Foggia
18:00 CEST	Anelli 7'; Gentile 30' (pen.); Russo 51'	Report	Longo 73'	Stadium: Stadio Pino Zaccheria; Referee: Braccini (Macerata)

23 October 2019	Portici	0–2	Savoia	Portici
15:00 CEST		Report	Romano 76'; Scalzone 88'	Stadium: Stadio San Ciro; Referee: Grasso (Ariano Irpino)

23 October 2019	Acireale	2–0	Messina F.C.	Acireale
19:00 CEST	Diop 32'; Mbaba 73'	Report		Stadium: Stadio Tupparello; Referee: Madonia (Palermo)

30 October 2019	Fasano	3–2	Taranto	Fasano
14:30 CEST	Corvino 59' (pen.); Diaz 66', 88'	Report	Croce 35'; Matute 63'	Stadium: Stadio Vito Curlo; Referee: Mirabella (Naples)

== Round of 16 ==
Ties were played between 13 November 2019 and 20 November 2019.

13 November 2019	Folgore Caratese	2–2 (3–1 p)	Seregno	Carate Brianza
14:30 CET	Ferrari 11' (o.g.); Derosa 69'	Report	Nenadovic 13' (pen.); Blazevic 39'	Stadium: Stadio XXV Aprile; Referee: Castellone (Naples)
	Penalties
	Derosa (penalty missed); Burato (penalty scored); Valotti (penalty scored); Marconi (penalty scored)		(penalty missed) Luoni; (penalty missed) Tomas; (penalty scored) Nenadovic; (penalty missed) Inverinizzi

13 November 2019	San Donato Tavarnelle	2–2 (2–3 p)	Seravezza	Tavarnelle
14:30 CET	Giordani 70' (pen.); Di Santo 90+4'	Report	Grassi 79' (pen.); Djibril 81'	Stadium: Stadio Leonardo Pianigiani; Referee: Giacometti (Gubbio)
	Penalties
	Monticelli (penalty scored); Masini (penalty scored); Brenna (penalty missed); Zuppardo (penalty missed); Favilli (penalty missed)		(penalty missed) Granaiola; (penalty scored) Bongiorni; (penalty missed) Djibril; (penalty scored) Grassi; (penalty scored) Maccabruni

13 November 2019	Inveruno	2–2 (3–5 p)	Sanremese	Inveruno
15:00 CET	Vai 25', 90+3'	Report	Gagliardini 14'; Manes 60'	Stadium: Stadio Luigino Garavaglia; Referee: Iacobellis (Pisa)
	Penalties
	Broggini (penalty missed); Stronati (penalty scored); Lillo (penalty scored); Vai (penalty scored)		(penalty scored) Taddei; (penalty scored) Colombi; (penalty scored) Demontis; (penalty scored) Spinosa; (penalty scored) Scalzi

13 November 2019	Tolentino	4–2	Mezzolara	Tolentino
15:30 CET	Di Domenicantonio 46'; Palmieri 54' (pen.); Minnozzi 85'; Mastromonaco 90+5'	Report	Iannello 72'; Sala 77'	Stadium: Stadio Della Vittoria; Referee: Marchionni (Rieti)

13 November 2019	Savoia	0–0 (3–5 p)	Fasano	Torre Annunziata
16:00 CET		Report		Stadium: Stadio Alfredo Giraud; Referee: Ubaldi (Rome)
	Penalties
	Poziello (penalty missed); Scalzone (penalty scored); Diakité (penalty scored); Giunta (penalty scored); Cerone (penalty missed); Dionisi (penalty missed)		(penalty scored) Forbes; (penalty scored) Díaz; (penalty missed) Tiratelli; (penalty scored) Corvino; (penalty missed) Ganci; (penalty scored) González

13 November 2019	Foggia	3–0	Acireale	Foggia
20:30 CET	Gentile 26' (pen.); Gerbaudo 44', 51'	Report		Stadium: Stadio Pino Zaccheria; Referee: Di Cicco (Lanciano)

13 November 2019	Torres	3–3 (2–4 p)	Pineto	Sassari
20:30 CET	S. Pinna 63'; Milani 70'; Sartor 77'	Report	Pepe 25'; Ciarcelluti 28'; Orlando 80'	Stadium: Stadio Vanni Sanna; Referee: Di Francesco (Ostia Lido)
	Penalties
	Sartor (penalty scored); Milani (penalty scored); Masala (penalty missed); S. Pinna (penalty missed)		(penalty scored) S. Amadio; (penalty scored) Palumbo; (penalty scored) Pepe; (penalty scored) Acquadro

20 November 2019	Union Feltre	3–0	Campodarsego	Feltre
20:00 CET	Aperi 47' (pen.); Costa 50'; Orchi 69'	Report		Stadium: Stadio Boscherai; Referee: Silvera (Valdarno)

== Quarter-finals ==
Ties were played between 4 December 2019 and 11 December 2019.

4 December 2019	Fasano	1–1 (5–3 p)	Foggia	Fasano
14:30 CET	Prinari 7'	Report	Russo 43'	Stadium: Stadio Vito Curlo; Referee: Vergaro (Bari)
	Penalties
	Cavaliere (penalty scored); Bernardini (penalty scored); Diaz (penalty scored); Corvino (penalty scored); Ganci (penalty scored)		(penalty scored) Gentile; (penalty scored) Cannas; (penalty scored) Di Jenno; (penalty missed) Gerbaudo

4 December 2019	Folgore Caratese	2–1	Union Feltre	Verano Brianza
15:00 CET	Valotti 47'; Ferrari 57'	Report	Aperi 61'	Stadium: Stadio Claudio Casati; Referee: Restaldo (Ivrea)

4 December 2019	Seravezza	1–1 (3–4 p)	Sanremese	Seravezza
15:30 CET	Bonigomi 11'	Report	Calderone 45'	Stadium: Stadio Buon Riposo; Referee: Gangi (Enna)
	Penalties
	Granaiola (penalty missed); Frugoli (penalty scored); Nelli (penalty scored); Grassi (penalty scored); Marinai (penalty missed); Giordani (penalty missed)		(penalty scored) Taddei; (penalty missed) Colombo; (penalty missed) Lo Bosco; (penalty scored) Spinosa; (penalty scored) Scalzi; (penalty scored) Bregliano

11 December 2019	Pineto	1–1 (4–5 p)	Tolentino	Pineto
17:30 CET	Marianeschi 29'	Report	Di Domenicantonio 68'	Stadium: Stadio Mariani-Pavone; Referee: Borriello (Arezzo)
	Penalties
	Ciarcelluti (penalty scored); S. Amadio (penalty scored); Pepe (penalty missed); Acquadro (penalty scored); Alessandro (penalty scored)		(penalty scored) Strano; (penalty scored) Capezzani; (penalty scored) Cicconetti; (penalty scored) Di Domenicantonio; (penalty scored) Minnozzi

== Semi-finals ==
Ties of first legs were played on 29 January 2020. Second leg tie of Folgore Caratese vs. Sanremese was not played due to Sanremese fielding an ineligible player in the first leg.

=== First leg ===
29 January 2020	Sanremese	0–3	Folgore Caratese	San Remo
15:00 CET	Scalzi 45'	Report		Stadium: Stadio Comunale; Referee: Turrini (Florence)
Note: Folgore Caratese were awarded a 3–0 win due to Sanremese fielding an ineligible player. Match originally ended with Sanremese winning 1–0.

29 January 2020	Tolentino	1–1	Fasano	Tolentino
15:30 CET	Strano 84'	Report	Diaz 47'	Stadium: Stadio Della Vittoria; Referee: Ubaldi (Rome)

=== Second leg ===
12 February 2020	Fasano	4–0 (5–1 agg.)	Tolentino	Fasano
15:30 CET	Rizzo 32'; Diaz 66'; Serri 77'; Cavaliere 86'	Report		Stadium: Stadio Vito Curlo; Referee: Calzavara (Varese)

Not played	Folgore Caratese	w/o	Sanremese
Note: Sanremese were disqualified from the tournament for fielding an ineligible player in the first leg.

== Final ==
Cancelled

Folgore Caratese	v	Fasano
