= William Martin (footballer, born 2007) =

Danish-Irish footballer (born 2007)

Personal information
- Full name: William Christian Martin
- Date of birth: 23 April 2007 (age 19)
- Place of birth: Bellinge, Denmark
- Height: 1.80 m (5 ft 11 in)
- Position: Forward

Team information
- Current team: OB
- Number: 23

Youth career
- Brændekilde-Bellinge
- OB

Senior career*
Years	Team	Apps	(Gls)
2024–	OB	44	(5)

International career
2022	Denmark U16	2	(0)
2023	Republic of Ireland U16	3	(3)
2023	Republic of Ireland U17	3	(1)
2024–2025	Denmark U18	8	(3)
2025–	Denmark U19	8	(2)
- * Club domestic league appearances and goals as of 19 May 2026

William Christian Martin (born 23 April 2007) is a Danish-Irish footballer who plays as a forward for Danish Superliga side OB.

== Club career ==
=== OB ===
Born in Bellinge, a suburb in Odense, Martin started his career at local club Brændekilde-Bellinge Boldklub, before joining OB as an U11 player. From there, he worked his way up through the club's academy.

After scoring an impressive 38 goals in 20 matches in the Danish U17 league, the 17-year-old Martin was permanently promoted to the first-team squad ahead of the 2024–25 season. At the same time, he signed a new contract extending until June 2027.

On 20 July 2024, Martin made his official debut for OB, as he was named in the starting lineup for the opening match of the season against Esbjerg fB in the Danish 1st Division. It was also during this season that Martin made his breakthrough with the first team, where, with three goals in 28 league appearances, he helped secure OB's promotion back to the 2025–26 Danish Superliga.

== International career ==
William was born and raised in Denmark, but his father, Danny Martin, who has also played and worked as a coach in the lower Danish divisions, is from Ireland. He is therefore eligible to represent both Denmark and Ireland. He represented the Republic of Ireland at U16 and U17 level.

Prior to this, he made two appearances for the Denmark U16 national team, and was later selected again for Denmark—this time at U18 level. He played two matches and scored a hat-trick in one of them, and was later selected again ahead of a match against Morocco.

In August 2025, Martin was selected for the Denmark U19 national team for the first time, and was later also named in the squad for the 2026 UEFA European Under-19 Championship qualification.

== Honours ==
OB

- Danish 1st Division: 2024–25
