= Demiane Agustien =

Dutch footballer (born 2007)

- Agustien playing for Arsenal in 2025

Personal information
- Full name: Demiane Hesus Agustien
- Date of birth: 28 July 2007 (age 19)
- Place of birth: Oss, Netherlands
- Height: 1.83 m (6 ft 0 in)
- Positions: Midfielder; winger

Team information
- Current team: Arsenal
- Number: 37

Youth career
- –2023: West Bromwich Albion
- 2023–2025: Derby County
- 2025–: Arsenal

International career^{‡}
Years	Team	Apps	(Gls)
2023	Curaçao U17	3	(0)
2025	Netherlands U18	2	(0)
2025–	Netherlands U19	7	(2)
- ‡ National team caps and goals as of 31 March 2026

Demiane Hesus Agustien (born 28 July 2007) is a professional footballer who plays as a midfielder or winger for Arsenal. Born in the Netherlands, he has represented Curaçao and the Netherlands internationally at youth level.

== Early life ==
Agustien was born on 28 July 2007. Born in Oss, Netherlands. He is the son of Curaçao international Kemy Agustien. At the age of one, he moved with his family to England and later returned to the Netherlands with his family.

== Club career ==
As a youth player, Agustien joined the youth academy of English side West Bromwich Albion. Following his stint there, he joined the youth academy of English side Derby County in 2023, where he played for the club's under-18 team. Ahead of the 2025–26 season, he joined the youth academy of English side Arsenal.

== International career ==
Agustien is a Curaçao and Netherlands youth international. During the autumn of 2025 and the spring of 2026, he played for the Netherlands national under-19 football team for 2026 UEFA European Under-19 Championship qualification.

== Style of play ==
Agustien plays as a midfielder or winger and has received comparisons to Germany international Jamal Musiala. Dutch news website Nederlandse Omroep Stichting wrote in 2025 that he "is a playmaker with an exceptional shot with his left foot. He places the balls exactly where he wants them".
