= Netherlands national under-19 football team =

National under-19 association football team representing the Netherlands

Netherlands U-19
- Association: Royal Dutch Football Association (KNVB)
- Confederation: UEFA (Europe)
- Head coach: Nicky Kuiper
- FIFA code: NED
| First colours | Second colours |

First international
- Netherlands 2–0 Republic of Ireland; 15 April 1948

Biggest win
- Netherlands 9–0 Gibraltar; 7 October 2015

Biggest defeat
- Greece 5–0 Netherlands; 21 July 1995

World Cup
- Appearances: 4 (first in 1983)
- Best result: Quarter-Finals (1983, 2001, 2005)

European championships
- Appearances: 12 (first in 1982)
- Best result: Champions (2025)

The Netherlands national under-19 football team represents the Netherlands at this age level and is governed by the Royal Dutch Football Association. They compete in international competitions like the UEFA European Under-19 Championship and the FIFA U-20 World Cup.

== Competitive record ==
=== FIFA U-20 World Cup ===
FIFA U-20 World Cup record
| Year | Result | Pld | W | D* | L | GF | GA | Squad |
|---|---|---|---|---|---|---|---|---|
| (Tunisia) 1977 | did not qualify | | | | | | | |
| (Japan) 1979 | did not qualify | | | | | | | |
| (Australia) 1981 | did not qualify | | | | | | | |
| (Mexico) 1983 | Quarter-Finals | 4 | 1 | 2 | 1 | 5 | 5 | Squad |
| (Soviet Union) 1985 | did not qualify | | | | | | | |
| (Chile) 1987 | did not qualify | | | | | | | |
| (Saudi Arabia) 1989 | did not qualify | | | | | | | |
| (Portugal) 1991 | did not qualify | | | | | | | |
| (Australia) 1993 | did not qualify | | | | | | | |
| (Qatar) 1995 | Group Stage | 3 | 1 | 0 | 2 | 7 | 5 | Squad |
| (Malaysia) 1997 | did not qualify | | | | | | | |
| (Nigeria) 1999 | did not qualify | | | | | | | |
| (Argentina) 2001 | Quarter-Finals | 5 | 2 | 1 | 2 | 8 | 8 | Squad |
| (United Arab Emirates) 2003 | did not qualify | | | | | | | |
| (Netherlands) 2005 | Quarter-Finals | 5 | 4 | 1 | 0 | 10 | 2 | Squad |
| (Canada) 2007 | did not qualify | | | | | | | |
| (Egypt) 2009 | did not qualify | | | | | | | |
| (Colombia) 2011 | did not qualify | | | | | | | |
| (Turkey) 2013 | did not qualify | | | | | | | |
| (New Zealand) 2015 | did not qualify | | | | | | | |
| (South Korea) 2017 | did not qualify | | | | | | | |
| (Poland) 2019 | did not qualify | | | | | | | |
| (Indonesia) ~~2021~~ | Initially qualified, tournament later cancelled | | | | | | | |
| (Argentina) 2023 | Did not qualify | | | | | | | |
| (Chile) 2025 | Did not qualify | | | | | | | |
| (Azerbaijan) (Uzbekistan) 2027 | To be determined | | | | | | | |
| (Armenia) (Georgia (country)) 2029 | To be determined | | | | | | | |
| Total | 4/25 | 17 | 8 | 4 | 5 | 30 | 20 | — |

=== UEFA European Under-18 Championship ===
| UEFA U-18 Championship record | | | | | | | | | Qualification | | | | | |
| Year | Result | Pld | W | D* | L | GF | GA | Squad | Pld | W | D* | L | GF | GA |
|---|---|---|---|---|---|---|---|---|---|---|---|---|---|---|
| (West Germany) 1981 | Did not qualify | | | | | | | | 4 | 2 | 1 | 1 | 12 | 4 |
| (Finland) 1982 | Group stage | 3 | 2 | 1 | 0 | 7 | 3 | Squad | 2 | 0 | 2 | 0 | 2 | 2 |
| (England) 1983 | Did not qualify | | | | | | | | 2 | 1 | 0 | 1 | 1 | 2 |
| (Soviet Union) 1984 | Did not qualify | | | | | | | | 2 | 0 | 0 | 2 | 2 | 4 |
| (Socialist Federal Republic of Yugoslavia) 1986 | Did not qualify | | | | | | | | 6 | 3 | 2 | 1 | 11 | 9 |
| (Czechoslovakia) 1988 | Quarterfinal | 2 | 0 | 0 | 2 | 0 | 4 | Squad | 6 | 2 | 3 | 1 | 5 | 3 |
| (Hungary) 1990 | Did not qualify | | | | | | | | 6 | 1 | 2 | 3 | 6 | 13 |
| (Germany) 1992 | Did not qualify | | | | | | | | 6 | 3 | 0 | 3 | 8 | 10 |
| (England) 1993 | Group stage | 3 | 0 | 1 | 2 | 4 | 8 | Squad | 4 | 3 | 1 | 0 | 6 | 2 |
| (Spain) 1994 | 4th place | 4 | 1 | 1 | 2 | 6 | 9 | Squad | 6 | 3 | 2 | 1 | 10 | 6 |
| (Greece) 1995 | 4th place | 4 | 2 | 0 | 2 | 10 | 11 | Squad | 6 | 4 | 1 | 1 | 11 | 7 |
| (France) 1996 | Did not qualify | | | | | | | | 4 | 3 | 0 | 1 | 17 | 8 |
| (Iceland) 1997 | Did not qualify | | | | | | | | 5 | 3 | 0 | 2 | 6 | 7 |
| (Cyprus) 1998 | Did not qualify | | | | | | | | 2 | 1 | 0 | 1 | 12 | 2 |
| (Sweden) 1999 | Did not qualify | | | | | | | | 8 | 6 | 0 | 2 | 18 | 4 |
| (Germany) 2000 | Group stage | 3 | 1 | 1 | 1 | 3 | 0 | Squad | 4 | 2 | 2 | 0 | 8 | 5 |
| (Finland) 2001 | Did not qualify | | | | | | | | 6 | 3 | 1 | 2 | 11 | 9 |
| Total | 6/16 | 19 | 6 | 4 | 9 | 30 | 35 | — | 79 | 40 | 17 | 22 | 146 | 97 |

=== UEFA European Under-19 Championship ===
| UEFA U-19 Championship record | | | | | | | | | Qualification | | | | | |
| Year | Result | Pld | W | D* | L | GF | GA | Squad | Pld | W | D* | L | GF | GA |
|---|---|---|---|---|---|---|---|---|---|---|---|---|---|---|
| (Norway) 2002 | did not qualify | | | | | | | | 5 | 3 | 1 | 1 | 18 | 4 |
| (Liechtenstein) 2003 | did not qualify | | | | | | | | 6 | 2 | 3 | 1 | 11 | 6 |
| (Switzerland) 2004 | did not qualify | | | | | | | | 6 | 2 | 2 | 2 | 4 | 2 |
| (Northern Ireland) 2005 | did not qualify | | | | | | | | 6 | 4 | 0 | 2 | 13 | 5 |
| (Poland) 2006 | did not qualify | | | | | | | | 3 | 0 | 2 | 1 | 4 | 5 |
| (Austria) 2007 | did not qualify | | | | | | | | 6 | 4 | 0 | 2 | 8 | 4 |
| (Czech Republic) 2008 | did not qualify | | | | | | | | 6 | 2 | 2 | 2 | 8 | 8 |
| (Ukraine) 2009 | did not qualify | | | | | | | | 6 | 3 | 2 | 1 | 11 | 7 |
| (France) 2010 | Group stage | 3 | 1 | 0 | 2 | 3 | 8 | Squad | 6 | 5 | 1 | 0 | 12 | 1 |
| (Romania) 2011 | did not qualify | | | | | | | | 6 | 3 | 2 | 1 | 9 | 3 |
| (Estonia) 2012 | did not qualify | | | | | | | | 6 | 4 | 1 | 1 | 10 | 7 |
| (Lithuania) 2013 | Group stage | 3 | 1 | 0 | 2 | 6 | 9 | Squad | 6 | 5 | 0 | 1 | 15 | 3 |
| (Hungary) 2014 | did not qualify | | | | | | | | 3 | 1 | 1 | 1 | 4 | 2 |
| (Greece) 2015 | Group stage | 3 | 1 | 1 | 1 | 2 | 2 | Squad | 6 | 5 | 1 | 0 | 18 | 2 |
| (Germany) 2016 | Group stage | 4 | 1 | 0 | 3 | 8 | 11 | Squad | 6 | 4 | 2 | 0 | 16 | 3 |
| (Georgia (country)) 2017 | Semi-finals | 4 | 1 | 1 | 2 | 5 | 3 | Squad | 6 | 5 | 1 | 0 | 10 | 1 |
| (Finland) 2018 | did not qualify | | | | | | | | 6 | 3 | 1 | 2 | 14 | 9 |
| (Armenia) 2019 | did not qualify | | | | | | | | 6 | 4 | 1 | 1 | 16 | 4 |
| (Northern Ireland) 2020 | Cancelled due to the COVID-19 pandemic | | | | | | | | 3 | 3 | 0 | 0 | 15 | 2 |
| (Romania) 2021 | Cancelled due to the COVID-19 pandemic | | | | | | | | Cancelled due to the COVID-19 pandemic | | | | | |
| (Slovakia) 2022 | did not qualify | | | | | | | | 3 | 3 | 0 | 0 | 13 | 1 |
| (Malta) 2023 | did not qualify | | | | | | | | 3 | 1 | 0 | 2 | 2 | 0 |
| (Northern Ireland) 2024 | did not qualify | | | | | | | | 6 | 4 | 0 | 2 | 13 | 5 |
| (Romania) 2025 | Champions | 5 | 5 | 0 | 0 | 13 | 3 | Squad | 6 | 5 | 1 | 0 | 11 | 1 |
| (Wales) 2026 | Did not qualify | | | | | | | | 6 | 5 | 0 | 1 | 18 | 7 |
| (Czech Republic) 2027 | to be determined | | | | | | | | to be determined | | | | | |
| (Bulgaria) 2028 | to be determined | | | | | | | | to be determined | | | | | |
| (Netherlands) 2029 | Qualified | | | | | | | | Qualified as hosts | | | | | |
| Total | 56/21 | 22 | 10 | 2 | 10 | 37 | 36 | — | 128 | 80 | 24 | 24 | 273 | 92 |

== Results and fixtures ==
Below are the results of the Netherlands U19 team in the past two years. Win Draw Loss

=== 2026 ===
| 25 March 2026 2026 U-19 Euro qualifiers R2 | Finland | 0–3 | Netherlands | Estadi Olímpic Camilo Cano, La Nucía |
| 15:00 | | Report | Van den Elshout 78', 87', 90+2' | Referee: Tim Marshall (Northern Ireland) |

| 28 March 2026 2026 U-19 Euro qualifiers R2 | Netherlands | 2–1 | Slovenia | Campo Municipal Antonio Solana, Alicante |
| 15:00 | Vianello 35'; Bahaty 83' | Report | Milojević 53' | Referee: Tim Marshall (Northern Ireland) |

| 31 March 2026 2026 U-19 Euro qualifiers R2 | Netherlands | 0–3 | Spain | Estadio Municipal Guillermo Amor, Benidorm |
| 18:00 | | Report | Salinas 56'; López 74'; Diallo 89' | Referee: Mikkel Redder (Denmark) |

| 25 March 2026 2027 U-19 Euro qualifiers R1 | Netherlands | 1–0 | Moldova | Sportpark Zuid, Groesbeek |
| 18:00 | Reulen 26' (pen.) | Report | | Referee: Mateo Erceg (Croatia) |

| 28 March 2026 2027 U-19 Euro qualifiers R1 | Netherlands | 4–0 | North Macedonia | Sportpark De Kranenhof, Escharen |
| 16:00 | Reulen 8', 53', 87'; Beerens 13' | Report | | Referee: Dmytro Kubriak (Ukraine) |

| 31 March 2026 2027 U-19 Euro qualifiers R1 | Faroe Islands | 0–3 | Netherlands | Sportpark Zuid, Groesbeek |
| 18:00 | | Report | Reulen 6'; Beerens 53'; Onunta 86' (pen.) | Referee: Daniyar Sakhi (Kazakhstan) |

| 11 November 2026 2027 U-19 Euro qualifiers R2 | Czech Republic | 2–0 | Netherlands | Sportski park NK Graničar, Kotoriba |
| 14:00 | Folprecht 45+1'; Jadrníček 62' | Report | | Referee: Patryk Gryckiewicz (Poland) |

| 14 November 2026 2027 U-19 Euro qualifiers R2 | Hungary | v | Netherlands | Sportski park NK Graničar, Kotoriba |
| 14:00 | | Report |

| 17 November 2026 2027 U-19 Euro qualifiers R2 | Netherlands | v | Croatia | SRP Trate Nedelišće, Nedelišće |
| 12:00 | | Report |

=== 2025 ===
| 12 November 2025 2026 U-19 Euro qualifiers R1 | Cyprus | 0–7 | Netherlands | Sportpark Bovenmolen, Oldebroek |
| 19:00 | | Report | Thomas 30'; Agustien 36'; van den Berg 47'; Van den Elshout 66', 84'; Bahaty 73'; Gürbüz 90+2' | Attendance: 718; Referee: Damian Kos (Poland) |

| 15 November 2025 2026 U-19 Euro qualifiers R1 | Netherlands | 2–1 | Kazakhstan | Sportpark Vondersweijde, Oldenzaal |
| 16:00 | Thomas 27'; Johnson 32' | Report | Nurgali 86' (pen.) | Attendance: 605; Referee: Bence Csonka (Hungary) |

| 18 November 2025 2026 U-19 Euro qualifiers R1 | Netherlands | 4–2 | Republic of Ireland | Sportpark Bovenmolen, Oldebroek |
| 19:00 | El Harmouz 11'; Kluivert 79'; Messori 83'; Van den Elshout 90+2' | Report | McCarthy 37'; Brennan 51' | Attendance: 646; Referee: Damian Kos (Poland) |

== Players ==
=== Current squad ===
Players born in 2007 or after are eligible for selection.

The following players were selected for the 2026 UEFA European Under-19 Championship qualification matches against Finland, Slovenia and Spain on 25, 28 and 31 March 2026; respectively.

Caps and goals correct as of 31 March 2026, after the match against Spain.

| No. | Pos. | Player | Date of birth (age) | Caps | Goals | Club |
|---|---|---|---|---|---|---|
| 1 | GK | Valentijn van der Velde | 12 January 2007 (age 19) | 9 | 0 | (Royal Dutch Football Association) Ajax |
| 16 | GK | Stijn Kuijsten | 11 July 2007 (age 19) | 0 | 0 | (Royal Dutch Football Association) PSV Eindhoven |
| | GK | Joep Geneste | 15 January 2007 (age 19) | 0 | 0 | (Royal Dutch Football Association) NEC Nijmegen |
| 2 | DF | Mylo van der Lans | 11 April 2007 (age 19) | 6 | 0 | (Royal Dutch Football Association) Ajax |
| 3 | DF | Jinairo Johnson | 8 April 2007 (age 19) | 8 | 1 | (Royal Dutch Football Association) Ajax |
| 4 | DF | Aaron Bouwman | 28 August 2007 (age 19) | 10 | 0 | (Royal Dutch Football Association) Ajax |
| 5 | DF | Lucas Jetten | 7 June 2007 (age 19) | 12 | 0 | (Royal Dutch Football Association) Ajax |
| 12 | DF | Lyfe Oldenstam | 2 February 2007 (age 19) | 9 | 0 | (Italian Football Federation) Como |
| 14 | DF | Rivas Manuhutu | 2 July 2007 (age 19) | 6 | 0 | (Royal Dutch Football Association) PSV Eindhoven |
| 15 | DF | Giannino Vianello | 10 June 2007 (age 19) | 9 | 1 | (Royal Dutch Football Association) Sparta Rotterdam |
| 6 | MF | Sean Steur | 11 January 2008 (age 18) | 3 | 0 | (The Football Association) Newcastle United |
| 8 | MF | Joël van den Berg | 11 February 2007 (age 19) | 11 | 1 | (Royal Dutch Football Association) PSV Eindhoven |
| 10 | MF | Jim Koller | 31 March 2007 (age 19) | 8 | 1 | (Royal Dutch Football Association) PSV Eindhoven |
| 18 | MF | Thijs Kraaijeveld | 3 May 2007 (age 19) | 7 | 0 | (Royal Dutch Football Association) Feyenoord |
| 19 | MF | Tobias van den Elshout | 2 February 2007 (age 19) | 8 | 7 | (Royal Dutch Football Association) Feyenoord |
| 20 | MF | Demiane Agustien | 28 July 2007 (age 19) | 7 | 2 | (The Football Association) Arsenal |
| 7 | FW | Eser Gürbüz | 6 March 2007 (age 19) | 9 | 2 | (Royal Dutch Football Association) Heerenveen |
| 9 | FW | Shane Kluivert | 24 September 2007 (age 19) | 11 | 1 | (Royal Spanish Football Federation) Barcelona |
| 11 | FW | Ayodele Thomas | 23 July 2007 (age 19) | 10 | 2 | (German Football Association) RB Leipzig |
| 17 | FW | Manuel Bahaty | 22 August 2007 (age 19) | 10 | 2 | (Royal Dutch Football Association) PSV Eindhoven |
| 21 | FW | Jesaja Mustapha | 15 March 2007 (age 19) | 3 | 0 | (Royal Dutch Football Association) NEC Nijmegen |

=== Recent call-ups ===
The following players have previously been called up to the Netherlands under-19 squad within the last twelve months and remain eligible.

| Pos. | Player | Date of birth (age) | Caps | Goals | Club | Latest call-up |
|---|---|---|---|---|---|---|
| GK | Oier Zon | 14 May 2007 (age 19) | 1 | 0 | (Netherlands) Feyenoord | v. Republic of Ireland, 18 November 2025 |
| DF | Michael Bresser | 24 April 2007 (age 19) | 3 | 0 | (Netherlands) PSV Eindhoven | v. France, 14 October 2025 |
| DF | Viggo Plantinga | 18 May 2007 (age 19) | 2 | 0 | (Netherlands) Utrecht | v. France, 14 October 2025 |
| MF | Luca Messori | 25 October 2007 (age 19) | 7 | 1 | (Netherlands) Ajax | v. Republic of Ireland, 18 November 2025 |
| MF | Nassim El Harmouz | 4 February 2007 (age 19) | 5 | 1 | (Netherlands) Feyenoord | v. Republic of Ireland, 18 November 2025 |
| MF | Benjamin Khaderi | 1 August 2007 (age 19) | 2 | 0 | (Netherlands) PSV Eindhoven | v. France, 14 October 2025 |
| MF | Jaden de Guzmán | 18 January 2007 (age 19) | 0 | 0 | (Netherlands) PSV Eindhoven | v. France, 14 October 2025 |

== Head-to-head record ==
The following table shows Netherlands' head-to-head record in the FIFA U-20 World Cup.

| Opponent | Pld | W | D | L | GF | GA | GD | Win % |
|---|---|---|---|---|---|---|---|---|
| Angola | 1 | 1 | 0 | 0 | 2 | 0 | +2 | 100.00 |
| Argentina | 2 | 0 | 0 | 2 | 1 | 3 | −2 | 0.00 |
| Australia | 1 | 1 | 0 | 0 | 3 | 0 | +3 | 100.00 |
| Benin | 1 | 1 | 0 | 0 | 1 | 0 | +1 | 100.00 |
| Brazil | 1 | 0 | 1 | 0 | 1 | 1 | +0 | 0.00 |
| Chile | 1 | 1 | 0 | 0 | 3 | 0 | +3 | 100.00 |
| Costa Rica | 1 | 0 | 0 | 1 | 1 | 3 | −2 | 0.00 |
| Ecuador | 1 | 0 | 1 | 0 | 1 | 1 | +0 | 0.00 |
| Egypt | 1 | 0 | 0 | 1 | 1 | 2 | −1 | 0.00 |
| Ethiopia | 1 | 1 | 0 | 0 | 3 | 2 | +1 | 100.00 |
| Honduras | 1 | 1 | 0 | 0 | 7 | 1 | +6 | 100.00 |
| Japan | 1 | 1 | 0 | 0 | 2 | 1 | +1 | 100.00 |
| Nigeria | 2 | 0 | 2 | 0 | 1 | 1 | +0 | 0.00 |
| Portugal | 1 | 0 | 0 | 1 | 0 | 3 | −3 | 0.00 |
| Soviet Union | 1 | 1 | 0 | 0 | 3 | 2 | +1 | 100.00 |
| Total | 17 | 8 | 4 | 5 | 30 | 20 | +10 | 47.06 |
