= Ayodele Thomas =

Dutch footballer (born 2007)

Personal information
- Date of birth: 23 July 2007 (age 19)
- Place of birth: Almere, Netherlands
- Height: 1.77 m (5 ft 10 in)
- Position: Winger

Team information
- Current team: NEC
- Number: 77

Youth career
- –2020: Almere City FC
- 2020–2023: Feyenoord
- 2023–2024: PSV Eindhoven

Senior career*
| Years | Team | Apps | (Gls) |
| 2024–2025 | Jong PSV | 41 | (5) |
| 2026 | RB Leipzig | 0 | (0) |
| 2026– | NEC | 3 | (0) |

International career^{‡}
| 2022 | Netherlands U15 | 4 | (1) |
| 2023–2024 | Netherlands U17 | 7 | (0) |
| 2024–2025 | Netherlands U18 | 6 | (1) |
| 2025– | Netherlands U19 | 10 | (2) |
- * Club domestic league appearances and goals as of 20 September 2026 ‡ National team caps and goals as of 31 March 2026

Ayodele Thomas (born 23 July 2007) is a Dutch professional footballer who plays as a winger for Eredivisie club NEC.

== Early life ==
Thomas was born on 23 July 2007. Born in Almere, Netherlands, he is of Nigerian and Croatian descent through his parents.

== Club career ==
As a youth player, Thomas joined the youth academy of Dutch side Almere City FC. Ahead of the 2020–21 season, he joined the youth academy of Dutch side Feyenoord at the age of twelve.

Three years later, he joined the youth academy of Dutch side PSV Eindhoven and was promoted to the club's reserve team in 2024, where he made forty-one league appearances and scored five goals. Following his stint there, he signed for German Bundesliga side RB Leipzig in 2026.

On 1 September 2026, Thomas returned to the Netherlands and signed a four-season contract with NEC.

== International career ==
Thomas is a Netherlands youth international. During the autumn of 2025, he played for the Netherlands national under-19 football team for 2026 UEFA European Under-19 Championship qualification.

== Style of play ==
Thomas plays as a winger. Dutch newspaper Eindhovens Dagblad wrote in 2026 that he "is lightning fast, can create opportunities with the ball, and is definitely a talent. But he also has clear areas for development, especially in his off-the-ball play".

== Career statistics ==
As of match played 20 September 2026

Appearances and goals by club, season and competition
| Club | Season | League | | | National cup | | Europe | | Other | | Total | |
| Club | Season | Division | Apps | Goals | Apps | Goals | Apps | Goals | Apps | Goals | Apps | Goals |
|---|---|---|---|---|---|---|---|---|---|---|---|---|
| Jong PSV | 2023–24 | Eerste Divisie | 2 | 0 | — | | — | | 1 (Note: Appearances in Premier League Cup) | 0 | 3 | 0 |
| Jong PSV | 2024–25 | Eerste Divisie | 21 | 2 | — | | — | | 2 | 0 | 23 | 2 |
| Jong PSV | 2025–26 | Eerste Divisie | 18 | 3 | — | | — | | 1 | 1 | 19 | 4 |
| Jong PSV | Total | | 41 | 5 | — | | — | | 4 | 1 | 45 | 6 |
| NEC | 2026–27 | Eredivisie | 3 | 0 | 0 | 0 | 1 (Note: Appearances in UEFA Europa League) | 0 | — | | 4 | 0 |
| Career total | | | 44 | 5 | 0 | 0 | 1 | 0 | 4 | 1 | 49 | 6 |
