= Valdemar Møller (footballer) =

Danish professional footballer (born 2007)

Personal information
- Full name: Valdemar Møller Damgaard
- Date of birth: 20 May 2007 (age 19)
- Place of birth: Hobro, Denmark
- Position: Midfielder

Team information
- Current team: AaB
- Number: 28

Youth career
- –2020: Aalborg Freja
- 2020–2025: AaB

Senior career*
Years	Team	Apps	(Gls)
2024–	AaB	30	(4)

International career^{‡}
2024–2025	Denmark U18	9	(1)
2025–	Denmark U19	8	(2)
- * Club domestic league appearances and goals as of 2 June 2026 ‡ National team caps and goals as of 21:42, 25 January 2026 (UTC)

Valdemar Møller Damgaard (born 20 May 2007) is a Danish professional footballer who plays as a midfielder for the Danish 1st Division club AaB.

== Career ==
=== AaB ===
Møller joined AaB from partner club Aalborg Freja as an U/13 player. In the following years he played in the club's academy.

In the second half of the 2023–24 season, Møller sat on the bench three times for AaB's first team, though without making his debut. He didn't make his debut until the following season, when he got just 15 minutes of playing time in the Danish Cup match against FC Fredericia on September 19, 2024. Just 10 days later, on September 29, 2024, Møller also made his Danish Superliga debut when he came on for the final few minutes against SønderjyskE.

On January 10, 2025, AaB confirmed that Møller extended his contract until the end of 2027 and was permanently promoted to the first team squad.
