= Luan Gadegbeku =

French footballer (born 2007)

Personal information
- Date of birth: 13 March 2007 (age 19)
- Place of birth: Juvisy-sur-Orge, France
- Height: 1.86 m (6 ft 1 in)
- Position: Midfielder

Team information
- Current team: Pau (on loan from Saint-Étienne)
- Number: 27

Youth career
- 2012–2022: Fleury
- 2022–2025: Saint-Étienne

Senior career*
Years	Team	Apps	(Gls)
2024–	Saint-Étienne B	25	(0)
2025–	Saint-Étienne	8	(0)
2026–	→ Pau (loan)	4	(0)

International career^{‡}
2022–2023	France U16	8	(1)
2024	France U17	2	(0)
2024–2025	France U18	9	(1)
2025–	France U19	3	(1)
- * Club domestic league appearances and goals as of 4 September 2026 ‡ National team caps and goals as of 18 November 2025

Luan Gadegbeku (born 13 March 2007) is a French professional footballer who plays as a midfielder for Ligue 2 club Pau on loan from Saint-Étienne.

== Club career ==
Gadegbeku came through the youth academy of Fleury before joining Saint-Étienne in 2022. On 16 May 2025, he signed his first professional contract with the club, a deal until 2028. On 9 August 2025, he made his professional debut in Ligue 2 as a starter in an eventual 3–3 draw away to Laval. His performance was described as "successful" and "encouraging" by observers.

== International career ==
Gadegbeku is a France youth international, making his debut for the France under-16s in 2022. He scored his first goal in a 3–0 win over the Netherlands on 10 February 2023.

== Personal life ==
Born in France, Gadegbeku is of Togolese descent.
