= Nadir El Jamali =

French footballer (born 2007)

Personal information
- Date of birth: 17 April 2007 (age 19)
- Place of birth: Paris, France
- Position: Attacking midfielder

Team information
- Current team: Saint-Étienne
- Number: 31

Youth career
- 2012–2022: Blanc Mesnil SF
- 2022–: Saint-Étienne

Senior career*
| Years | Team | Apps | (Gls) |
| 2024– | Saint-Étienne B | 21 | (3) |
| 2025– | Saint-Étienne | 15 | (0) |

International career^{‡}
| 2024 | Morocco U17 | 4 | (1) |
| 2024 | Morocco U18 | 2 | (0) |
| 2024– | France U18 | 3 | (1) |
- * Club domestic league appearances and goals as of 11 May 2026 ‡ National team caps and goals as of 21:04, 9 August 2025 (UTC)

Nadir El Jamali (born 17 April 2007) is a French professional footballer who plays as an attacking midfielder for Ligue 2 club Saint-Étienne. He has represented both France and Morocco at youth international level.

== Club career ==
Having first come through the ranks of Blanc Mesnil SF in his native Île-de-France, El Jamali joined Saint-Étienne in 2022. On 25 May 2025, he signed his first professional contract with Saint-Étienne, a deal lasting until 2028. During preseason ahead of the 2025–26 season, El Jamali was praised by Saint-Étienne manager Eirik Horneland as a "great player" with "very good comprehension of the game." On 9 August 2025, he made his Ligue 2 debut as a substitute in a 3–3 draw against Laval.

== International career ==
El Jamali has represented Morocco and France at youth international level. After having played for the Morocco under-17s and under-18s, he made his debut for the France under-18s in November 2024.

== Personal life ==
Born in France, El Jamali is of Moroccan descent.
