= SSD Città di Acireale 1946 =

Italian football club

Acireale FC
- Full name: A.S.D. Acireale FC
- Nicknames: I granata di Sicilia (The Maroons of Sicily), Jacitani (Jacitans), Acesi
- Founded: 11 June 1946; 80 years ago as Associazione Sportiva Acireale; 2006 (refounded); 2014 (refounded); 2026(refounded)
- Ground: Stadio Aci e Galatea
- Capacity: 14,500
- Coach: Salvatore Foti
- League: Eccellenza
Home colours	Away colours

A.S.D. Acireale FC, commonly known as Acireale (pronounced [ˌatʃireˈaːle]), is an Italian football club based in Acireale, Sicily, who compete in Eccellenza, the fifth tier of the Italian football league system. The club was established in 1946 as a successor to Società Sportiva Acireale, which folded in 1993. Its golden era came in the 1990s, when it reached Serie B and competed for two consecutive seasons: 1993–94 and 1994–95.

== History ==
=== Foundation ===
The club's roots can be traced back to a previous club in the city, from whose ashes the current incarnation rose; the older club in the town played between 1928 and 1935.

The club was founded on 11 June 1946, as A.C. Acireale, making its debut in Serie C, with its first squad coached by former Juventus player Luigi Bertolini. That early lineup included Core, Maccarrone, Cantarella, Dereani, Barattucci, Conti, Signorelli, Raciti, Grasso, Creziato, and Cusumano. The granata enjoyed several solid seasons, eventually earning promotion in the 1957–58 campaign, and later achieving promotion to Serie C in the 1968–69 season.

Between the latter half of the 1960s and 1972, the club competed under the name "Acquapozzillo." Less than a decade after their ascent, the team dropped back to Serie D in the 1975–76 season and went on to participate in several editions of the Interregional Championship.

The 1980s and 1990s would prove to be some of the most exciting years in Acireale's history.

The team reached its culmination in 1992/1993 when, after a long period played in Serie C1, C2 and D, the team, coached by Giuseppe Papadopulo, surprisingly gained its first promotion to Serie B. During its first Serie B season in 1993–94, Acireale avoided relegation after having won a play-off against Pisa on penalties. But, in its next season, Acireale was not able to repeat their feat, and were relegated to Serie C1. Acireale successively played consecutively four season in Serie C2, a period which ended in 2003 after being promoted on playoffs. However, after a disappointing Serie C1 season in 2005–06, ended with a relegation to Serie C2, Acireale dropped because of financial troubles.

=== The refoundation ===

A new property registered the club as Acireale Calcio to the Promozione regional league, the 7th level in the Italian football league system. In its first Promozione season, the club readily won its league round, being thus promoted to Eccellenza. The club was renamed to the current denomination in August 2007, and will take part to the Sicilian Group B of Eccellenza in 2007–2008, obtaining the promotion in the season 2009–10 to Serie D.

== Notable former managers ==
- (Italy) Walter Mazzarri
- (Italy) Giuseppe Papadopulo
- (Italy) Francesco Scoglio
