= Javison Idele =

Italian footballer (born 2007)

Personal information
- Full name: Javison Osarumwense Idele
- Date of birth: 23 January 2007 (age 19)
- Place of birth: Province of Bergamo, Italy
- Height: 1.87 m (6 ft 2 in)
- Positions: Defender; wide midfielder; winger

Team information
- Current team: Atalanta
- Number: 41

Youth career
- Atalanta

Senior career*
Years	Team	Apps	(Gls)
2024–	Atalanta U23	24	(0)
2025–	Atalanta	1	(0)

International career^{‡}
2025	Italy U18	2	(0)
2025–	Italy U19	10	(1)
2025–	Italy U20	7	(0)
- * Club domestic league appearances and goals as of 2 November 2026 ‡ National team caps and goals as of 16 November 2026

Javison Osarumwense Idele (born 23 January 2007) is an Italian professional footballer who plays as a defender, wide midfielder, winger for Serie A club Atalanta.

== Early and personal life ==
Idele was born on 23 January 2007, in the Province of Bergamo. He is of Nigerian descent through his parents, and has two siblings, an older brother and a younger sister.

== Club career ==
As a youth player, Idele joined the youth academy of Serie A side Atalanta, where he played in the UEFA Youth League and helped the club's under-21 team win the 2025–26 Coppa Italia Primavera.

Ahead of the 2024–25 season, he was promoted to Atalanta's reserve team. On 15 October 2026, he debuted for the club's senior team in a 3–1 home win over Pafos in the UEFA Conference League.

== International career ==
Idele is an Italy youth international and has represented the country internationally at under-18, under-19 and under-20 levels and is eligible to represent Nigeria internationally through his parents. Altogether, he made two appearances and scored zero goals while playing for the Italy national under-18 football team.

During the autumn of 2025, he played for the Italy national under-20 football team at the 2025 FIFA U-20 World Cup. In 2026, he played for the Italy national under-19 football team at the 2026 UEFA European Under-19 Championship.

== Style of play ==
Idele plays as a defender or winger and is right-footed. Italian newspaper Sprint e Sport wrote in 2025 that he "is a natural right-footed player , capable of adapting to multiple roles: wide midfielder , full-back, and even right-back in a three-man defense. His physical qualities are impressive: speed and stamina are his main weapons, which he uses to constantly push forward down the flank".
