= Florin Gașpăr =

Romanian footballer (born 2007)

Personal information
- Full name: Florin Eugen Alexandru Gașpăr
- Date of birth: 25 September 2007 (age 19)
- Place of birth: Craiova, Romania
- Height: 1.75 m (5 ft 9 in)
- Positions: Right-back; right winger

Team information
- Current team: Chindia Târgoviște (on loan from Universitatea Craiova)
- Number: 2

Youth career
- 2015–2023: CSȘ Craiova
- 2023–2025: Universitatea Craiova

Senior career*
Years	Team	Apps	(Gls)
2025–	Universitatea Craiova	1	(0)
2025	→ CSM Reșița (loan)	10	(1)
2025–2026	→ CSM Reșița (loan)	27	(2)
2026–	→ Chindia Târgoviște (loan)	12	(1)

International career^{‡}
2022	Romania U15	5	(0)
2022–2023	Romania U16	13	(0)
2023–2024	Romania U17	12	(0)
2024–2025	Romania U18	11	(1)
2025–	Romania U19	10	(1)
- * Club domestic league appearances and goals as of 31 October 2026 ‡ National team caps and goals as of 31 March 2026

Florin Eugen Alexandru Gașpăr (born 25 September 2007) is a Romanian professional footballer who plays as a right-back or a right winger for Liga II club Chindia Târgoviște, on loan from Liga I club Universitatea Craiova.

== Career statistics ==
As of 31 October 2026

Appearances and goals by club, season and competition
Club	Season	League			Cupa României		Europe		Other		Total	
Club	Season	Division	Apps	Goals	Apps	Goals	Apps	Goals	Apps	Goals	Apps	Goals
Universitatea Craiova	2024–25	Liga I	0	0	0	0	0	0	—		0	0
Universitatea Craiova	2025–26	Liga I	1	0	—		0	0	—		1	0
Universitatea Craiova	2026–27	Liga I	—		—		0	0	0	0	0	0
Universitatea Craiova	Total		1	0	0	0	0	0	0	0	1	0
CSM Reșița (loan)	2024–25	Liga II	10	1	2	0	—		—		12	1
CSM Reșița (loan)	2025–26	Liga II	27	2	1	0	—		—		28	2
CSM Reșița (loan)	Total		37	3	3	0	—		—		40	3
Chindia Târgoviște (loan)	2026–27	Liga II	12	1	1	0	—		—		13	1
Career total			50	4	4	0	0	0	—		54	4

== Honours ==
Universitatea Craiova

- Supercupa României: 2026
