= Albert Rrahmani =

Kosovan-Danish footballer (born 2007)

Personal information
- Full name: Albert Rrahmani
- Date of birth: 11 March 2007 (age 19)
- Place of birth: Sønderborg, Denmark
- Height: 1.74 m (5 ft 9 in)
- Position: Winger

Team information
- Current team: Nykøbing (on loan from Sønderjyske)
- Number: 17

Youth career
- FC Sønderborg
- SUB Sønderborg
- Sønderjyske

Senior career*
Years	Team	Apps	(Gls)
2024–	Sønderjyske	8	(2)
2026–	→ Nykøbing (loan)	7	(0)

International career
2025–	Kosovo U-19	2	(0)
- * Club domestic league appearances and goals as of 3 October 2026

Albert Rrahmani (born 11 March 2007) is a Kosovan-Danish footballer who plays as a winger for Danish 2nd Division club Nykøbing, on loan from Danish Superliga club Sønderjyske.

== Career ==
=== Sønderjyske ===
Rrahmani was born and raised in Sønderborg, and began his football career at the local club FC Sønderborg, and later also at Sønderborg Boldklub, before eventually joining Sønderjyske during his youth career. There, he worked his way up through the club's academy.

On 4 September 2024, 17-year-old Rrahmani made his official debut for Sønderjyske in a Danish Cup match against Solrød FC, in which he also scored. On 1 May 2025, Sønderjyske confirmed that they had signed Rrahmani on a contract running until June 2028.

On 18 May 2025, Rrahmani made his Danish Superliga debut in a match against Lyngby BK, coming on in the 67th minute to replace Lirim Qamili and scoring to make it 5–1, the final score of the match. Rrahmani also made a substitute appearance in the following league match against Vejle BK, where he scored again, meaning he had found the net in each of his first three appearances for Sønderjyske.

On 7 August 2026, Rrahmani was loaned out to Danish 2nd Division club Nykøbing FC for the rest of the season, due to the prospect of getting more regular minutes.

== Personal life ==
Rrahmani was born in Denmark but has roots in Kosovo.
