= Mateo Aćimović =

Slovenian footballer (born 2007)

Personal information
- Date of birth: 5 October 2007 (age 19)
- Place of birth: Ljubljana, Slovenia
- Height: 1.76 m (5 ft 9 in)
- Position: Attacking midfielder

Team information
- Current team: Las Palmas
- Number: 16

Youth career
- 2014–2026: Olimpija Ljubljana

Senior career*
Years	Team	Apps	(Gls)
2024–2026	Olimpija Ljubljana	10	(0)
2026–	Las Palmas	1	(0)

International career^{‡}
2021–2022	Slovenia U15	8	(3)
2022–2023	Slovenia U16	9	(1)
2023–2024	Slovenia U17	11	(1)
2025	Slovenia U18	2	(0)
2025	Slovenia U19	3	(2)
2025–	Slovenia U21	2	(0)
- * Club domestic league appearances and goals as of 13 October 2026 ‡ National team caps and goals as of 28 July 2026

Mateo Aćimović (born 5 October 2007) is a Slovenian professional footballer who plays as an attacking midfielder for Segunda División club Las Palmas.

== Club career ==
=== Olimpija Ljubljana ===
Aćimović started his career with Olimpija Ljubljana in 2014 at the age of six, and signed his first professional contract with the club in September 2023. He made his senior debut on 5 August 2024, in a 2–0 Slovenian PrvaLiga win over Nafta 1903, and scored his first goal the following April, in a Slovenian Cup game against Beltinci; aged 17, he became the club's youngest scorer in the tournament.

In May 2025, Aćimović renewed his contract with Olimpija until 2028.

=== Las Palmas ===
On 22 June 2026, Aćimović moved abroad for the first time in his career, signing a four-year contract with Segunda División side Las Palmas for an undisclosed fee.

== International career ==
Aćimović represented Slovenia at all national youth levels from under-15 to under-21.

== Personal life ==
Aćimović is the son of former Slovenian international Milenko Ačimovič.
