= Tidiane Devernois =

French footballer

Personal information
- Date of birth: 18 October 2007 (age 19)
- Place of birth: Évry-Courcouronnes, France
- Height: 1.87 m (6 ft 2 in)
- Position: Midfielder

Team information
- Current team: Auxerre
- Number: 36

Youth career
- 2012–2018: Draveil FC
- 2018–2019: ES Montgeron
- 2019–2021: Ris Orangis US
- 2021–2022: CS Brétigny
- 2022–2024: Auxerre

Senior career*
Years	Team	Apps	(Gls)
2024–	Auxerre II	28	(4)
2025–	Auxerre	2	(0)

International career^{‡}
2023	France U16	2	(0)
2025	France U19	7	(1)
- * Club domestic league appearances and goals as of 20 May 2026 ‡ National team caps and goals as of 22:41, 31 December 2025 (UTC)

Tidiane Devernois (born 18 October 2007) is a French professional footballer who plays as a midfielder for the Ligue 1 club Auxerre.

== Club career ==
Devernois is a product of the youth academies of the French clubs Draveil FC, ES Montgeron, Ris Orangis US, CS Brétigny, and Auxerre. He was promoted to Auxerre's reserves in the Championnat National 2 in 2024 and became their captain in 2025. On 13 June 2025, he signed his first professional contract with Auxerre until 2028. He debuted with the senior Auxerre team as a substitute in a 2–1 Coupe de France loss to Monaco on 21 December 2025, where he assisted his sides only goal.

== Personal life ==
Born in France, Devernois is of Senegalese descent. He was called up to the France U19s for a set of friendlies in August 2025.
