= Rudi Vikström =

Finnish footballer (born 2007)

Personal information
- Date of birth: 18 July 2007 (age 19)
- Place of birth: Finland
- Height: 1.82 m (6 ft 0 in)
- Position: Centre forward

Team information
- Current team: IK Oddevold
- Number: 9

Youth career
- Esse IK
- Jaro

Senior career*
Years	Team	Apps	(Gls)
2022	Esse IK	2	(0)
2023–2025	Jaro Akademi	32	(42)
2024	Jakobstads BK	1	(1)
2025–2026	Jaro	37	(8)
2026–	IK Oddevold	8	(1)

International career^{‡}
2025–	Finland U19	7	(5)
- * Club domestic league appearances and goals as of 12 November 2026 ‡ National team caps and goals as of 22 November 2025

Rudi Vikström (born 18 July 2007) is a Finnish professional footballer who plays as a centre forward for Superettan club IK Oddevold.

== Career ==
Vikström signed a multi-year youth contract with Jaro on 28 December 2024.

Vikström scored his first Veikkausliiga goal for Jaro on 18 June 2025, by a winning goal in a stoppage time in a 2–1 home win against AC Oulu. On 2 July, he scored his second league goal, the winning goal again in a stoppage time, in a 3–2 away win against HJK Helsinki.

== Career statistics ==
As of 12 November 2026

Appearances and goals by club, season and competition
Club	Season	League			National cup (Note: Includes Finnish Cup)		League cup (Note: Includes Finnish League Cup)		Total	
Club	Season	Division	Apps	Goals	Apps	Goals	Apps	Goals	Apps	Goals
Esse IK	2022	Kolmonen	2	0	–		–		2	0
Jaro Akademi	2023	Kolmonen	10	2	–		–		10	2
Jaro Akademi	2024	Kolmonen	8	6	–		–		8	6
Jaro Akademi	2025	Kolmonen	14	34	–		–		14	34
Jaro Akademi	Total		32	42	0	0	0	0	32	42
Jakobstads BK (loan)	2024	Kakkonen	1	1	–		–		1	1
Jaro	2025	Veikkausliiga	18	4	4	3	5	0	27	7
Jaro	2026	Veikkausliiga	19	4	2	0	5	7	5	7
Jaro	Total		37	8	6	3	10	7	53	18
Oddevold	2026	Superettan	8	1	0	0	–		8	1
Career total			80	52	6	3	10	7	96	62
