= Andrej Vasovic =

Swiss footballer (born 2007)

Personal information
- Date of birth: 14 October 2007 (age 19)
- Place of birth: Switzerland
- Position: Forward

Team information
- Current team: Club Brugge KV
- Number: 77

Youth career
- –2024: FC Luzern

Senior career*
| Years | Team | Apps | (Gls) |
| 2024–2026 | FC Luzern | 23 | (6) |
| 2026– | Club Brugge KV | 0 | (0) |

International career
| 2025– | Switzerland U17 | 11 | (7) |
- * Club domestic league appearances and goals as of 17 July 2026

Andrej Vasovic (Serbian Cyrillic: Андреј Васовић; born 14 October 2007) is a Swiss footballer who plays as a forward for Belgian Pro League club Club Brugge KV.

== Early life ==
Vasovic was born on 14 October 2007 in Switzerland.

== Club career ==
=== FC Luzern ===
Vasovic came through the youth academy of FC Luzern. At 31 October 2024, he made his professional debut with FC Luzern against Servette FC. He replaced Lars Villiger after 83 minutes in a 2–2 away draw. On 4 February 2026, he scored his first league goal against FC St. Gallen.

=== Club Brugge ===
In July 2026, Vasovic signed a four-year deal with Club Brugge KV.
