= Louis Buffon =

Italian-Czech footballer (born 2007)

Personal information
- Full name: Louis Thomas Buffon
- Date of birth: 28 December 2007 (age 18)
- Place of birth: Turin, Italy
- Height: 1.88 m (6 ft 2 in)
- Position: Forward

Team information
- Current team: Pisa

Youth career
- 2017–2020: Sisport
- 2020–2022: Juventus
- 2022–2023: CBS Scuola Calcio
- 2023–: Pisa

Senior career*
Years	Team	Apps	(Gls)
2025–	Pisa	5	(0)
2026	→ Pontedera (loan)	10	(0)

International career
2025–	Czech Republic U18	3	(1)
2025–	Czech Republic U19	7	(6)
- * Club domestic league appearances and goals as of 4 April 2026

Louis Thomas Buffon (born 28 December 2007) is a professional footballer who plays as a forward for Serie B club Pisa. Born in Italy, Buffon plays for the Czech Republic at the youth level.

== Early life ==
Born on 28 December 2007 in Turin, Italy, Louis is the son of Italian goalkeeper Gianluigi Buffon and Czech model Alena Šeredová. He has a brother, David Lee, a half-brother, and a half-sister. Buffon was given the middle name Thomas in honour of former Cameroon goalkeeper Thomas N'Kono.

== Club career ==
Buffon started his football career in 2017 at Sisport. In 2020, he made his debut for Juventus's under-13 team. During the 2022–23 season, Buffon scored 17 goals in 20 games with CBS Scuola Calcio's under-16 team. He moved to the youth academy of Pisa in 2023.

On 9 March 2025, Buffon made his professional debut with Pisa, in a 3–2 Serie B away defeat against Spezia. He made his Coppa Italia debut on 25 September 2025, in a 1–0 away defeat against Torino. His Serie A debut came on 5 October 2025, in Pisa's 4–0 away defeat against Bologna.

On 2 February 2026, Buffon was loaned to Pontedera in Serie C.

== International career ==
Buffon was eligible to play for both Italy and the Czech Republic, thanks to parental ties. He opted to play for the Czech Republic U18 team in 2025, and made his unofficial debut in a game against the reserves of Dynamo České Budějovice.

== Career statistics ==
As of match played 5 October 2025

Appearances and goals by club, season and competition
Club	Season	League			Coppa Italia		Total	
Club	Season	Division	Apps	Goals	Apps	Goals	Apps	Goals
Pisa	2024–25	Serie B	1	0	—		1	0
Pisa	2025–26	Serie A	4	0	1	0	5	0
Pisa	Total		5	0	1	0	6	0
Career total			5	0	1	0	6	0
