= Stadio Aci e Galatea =

Football stadium in Acireale, Italy

- Stadio Tupparello
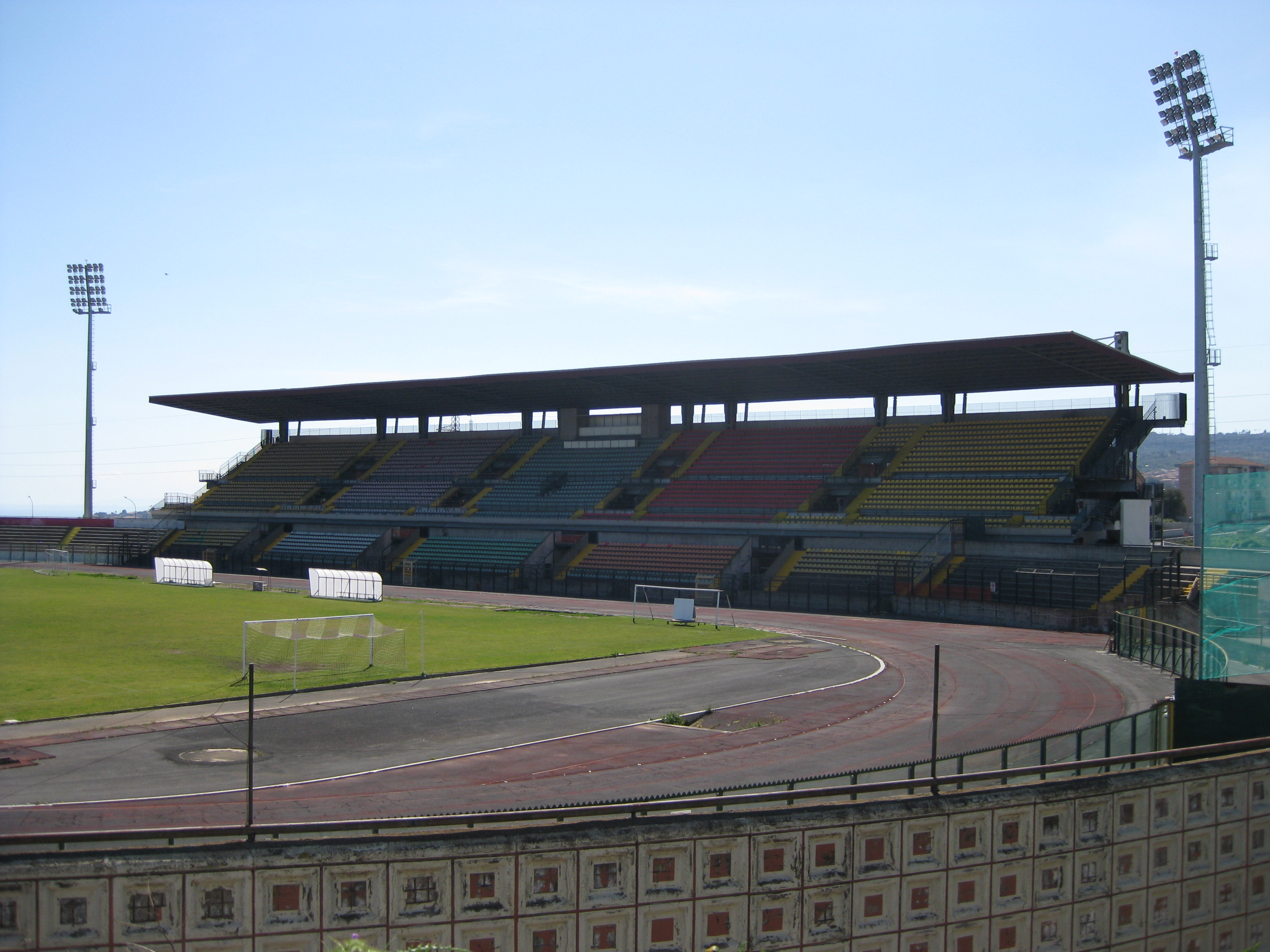
- Interactive map of Stadio Aci e Galatea
- Address: Via dello Stadio, 36 95024
- Location: Acireale, Italy
- Coordinates: 37°36′0″N 15°9′36″E
- Owner: Comune di Acireale
- Capacity: 14,500 seated
- Surface: Grass
- Record attendance: 12,500 vs. ACF Fiorentina (15 February 1976, Serie B)
- Field size: 105 m × 68 m (344 ft × 223 ft)

Construction
- Groundbreaking: 1972
- Built: 1972-1974
- Opened: 1974
- Renovated: 22 August 1993

Tenant
- SSD Città di Acireale 1946 (1993–present)

Stadio Aci e Galatea, also known as Stadio Tupparello, is a multi-use stadium in Acireale, Italy. It is currently used mostly for football matches and is the home ground of SSD Città di Acireale 1946. The stadium holds 14,500.
