= 2024 UEFA European Under-19 Championship qualification =

Tournament details
- Dates: Qualifying round: 11 October – 21 November 2023; Elite round: 20 – 26 March 2024
- Teams: 53 (from 1 confederation)

Tournament statistics
- Matches played: 120
- Goals scored: 338 (2.82 per match)
- Attendance: 7,174 (60 per match)
- Top scorer(s): (Germany) Dženan Pejčinović (8 goals)
- All statistics correct as of 26 March 2024.

The 2024 UEFA European Under-19 Championship qualification was a men's under-19 national football team competition that determined the seven teams joining the automatically qualified hosts Northern Ireland in the 2024 UEFA European Under-19 Championship final tournament. Players born on or after 1 January 2005 are eligible to participate.

Russia was excluded from participating in the tournament due to the ongoing invasion of Ukraine. Therefore, excluding hosts Northern Ireland, 53 teams entered this qualification competition, which consists of a qualifying round played in October–November 2023, followed by an elite round played in March 2024.

== Format ==
The qualifying competition consisted of the following two rounds:

- Qualifying Round: Apart from Portugal, which receives a bye to the elite round as the team with the highest seeding coefficient, the remaining 52 teams are drawn in 13 groups of four teams. Each group was played in single round-robin format at one of the teams selected as hosts after the draw. The 13 group winners, 13 runners-up, and the third placed team with the best record against the first and second-placed teams in their group advance to the elite round.
- Elite Round: The 28 teams are drawn into seven groups of four teams. Each group is played in single round-robin format at one of the teams selected as hosts after the draw. The seven group winners qualify for the final tournament.

The schedule of each group is as follows, with two rest days between each matchday (Regulations Article 20.04):

Group Schedule

Matchday	Matches
Matchday 1	1 v 4, 3 v 2
Matchday 2	1 v 3, 2 v 4
Matchday 3	2 v 1, 4 v 3

=== Tiebreakers ===
In the qualifying and elite round, teams are ranked according to points (3 points for a win, 1 point for a draw, 0 points for a loss), and if tied on points, the following tiebreaking criteria are applied, in the order given, to determine the rankings (Regulations Articles 14.01 and 14.02):

1. Points in head to head matches among tied teams
2. Goal difference in head to head matches among tied teams
3. Goals scored in head to head matches among tied teams
4. If more than two teams are tied, and after applying all head-to-head criteria above, a subset of teams are still tied, all head-to-head criteria above are reapplied exclusively to this subset of teams
5. Goal difference in all group matches
6. Goals scored in all group matches
7. Penalty shoot-out if only two teams have the same number of points, and they met in the last round of the group and are tied after applying all criteria above (not used if more than two teams have the same number of points, or if their rankings are not relevant for qualification for the next stage)
8. Disciplinary points (red card = 3 points, yellow card = 1 point, expulsion for 2 yellow cards in one match = 3 points)
9. UEFA coefficient ranking for the qualifying round draw

To determine the best third-placed team from the qualifying round, the results against the teams in fourth place are discarded. The following criteria are applied (Regulations Articles 15.01 and 15.02):

1. Points
2. Goal difference
3. Goals scored
4. Disciplinary points (total 3 matches)
5. UEFA coefficient ranking for the qualifying round draw

== Qualifying round ==
=== Draw ===
The draw for the qualifying round was held on 8 December 2022, at the UEFA headquarters in Nyon, Switzerland.

The teams were seeded according to their coefficient ranking, calculated based on the following:

- 2017 UEFA European Under-19 Championship final tournament and qualifying competition (qualifying round and elite round)
- 2018 UEFA European Under-19 Championship final tournament and qualifying competition (qualifying round and elite round)
- 2019 UEFA European Under-19 Championship final tournament and qualifying competition (qualifying round and elite round)
- 2022 UEFA European Under-19 Championship final tournament and qualifying competition (qualifying round and elite round)

Each group contained one team from Pot A, one team from Pot B, one team from Pot C, and one team from Pot D. Based on the decisions taken by the UEFA Emergency Panel, the following pairs of teams could not be drawn in the same group: Spain and Gibraltar, Belarus and Ukraine, Kosovo and Serbia, Kosovo and Bosnia & Herzegovina

Final tournament hosts: Team / Coeff. / Rank; **Northern Ireland** / 3.667 / —	Bye to elite round: Team / Coeff. / Rank; Portugal / 26.056 / 1

Teams entering qualifying round

Pot A
Team	Coeff.	Rank
England	25.222	2
**France**	22.000	3
**Italy**	21.444	4
**Czech Republic**	16.889	5
**Spain**	16.689	6
**Ukraine**	15.056	7
Republic of Ireland	14.944	8
**Netherlands**	14.556	9
**Norway**	14.111	10
**Israel**	14.056	11
**Germany**	13.833	12
**Turkey**	12.444	13
**Serbia**	11.833	14

Pot B
Team	Coeff.	Rank
**Austria**	11.333	15
Slovakia	11.333	16
**Romania**	11.167	17
Hungary	10.667	18
**Belgium**	10.333	19
Sweden	10.278	20
**Scotland**	9.500	21
**Croatia**	9.500	22
**Greece**	9.000	23
**Denmark**	8.933	24
**Bosnia and Herzegovina**	8.833	25
**Georgia**	8.833	26
Poland	8.500	27

Pot C
Team	Coeff.	Rank
Finland	8.500	28
Bulgaria	8.056	29
Iceland	6.000	30
**Switzerland**	5.833	31
Armenia	5.667	32
Cyprus	5.333	33
Wales	5.333	34
**Latvia**	5.333	35
**Slovenia**	5.333	36
Azerbaijan	4.500	37
Belarus	4.333	38
**North Macedonia**	4.333	39
**Kosovo**	3.167	40

Pot D
Team	Coeff.	Rank
Albania	2.333	41
**Montenegro**	2.333	42
Malta	2.333	43
Moldova	1.667	44
Kazakhstan	1.667	45
Faroe Islands	1.333	46
Andorra	1.333	47
**Lithuania**	0.333	48
Estonia	0.333	49
Luxembourg	0.333	50
San Marino	0.000	51
Gibraltar	0.000	52
Liechtenstein	0.000	53

Notes

- Teams marked in **bold** have qualified for the final tournament.

=== Groups ===
==== Group 1 ====
Pos	Team	Pld	W	D	L	GF	GA	GD	Pts	Qualification
1	Denmark	3	2	1	0	7	2	+5	**7**	Elite round
2	France (H)	3	2	0	1	4	2	+2	**6**	Elite round
3	Iceland	3	1	1	1	4	2	+2	**4**	
4	Estonia	3	0	0	3	0	9	−9	**0**	

Source: UEFA
Rules for classification: Tiebreakers
(H) Hosts
15 November 2023
15:00

Iceland	1–1	Denmark
Fjeldsted 44'	Report	Andreasen 7' (pen.)

Stade Marcel Garcin, Orléans
Attendance: 112
Referee: Daniel Schlager (Germany)
15 November 2023
18:00

France	2–0	Estonia
D. Doué 22'; Jacquet 55' (pen.)	Report

Stade de la Source, Orléans
Attendance: 534
Referee: Miguel Nogueira (Portugal)

18 November 2023
15:00

Denmark	4–0	Estonia
Andreasen 45', 53'; Froholdt 90'; Bischoff 90+2'	Report

Stade Marcel Garcin, Orléans
Attendance: 91
Referee: Miguel Nogueira (Portugal)
18 November 2023
18:00

France	1–0	Iceland
Orrason 89' (o.g.)	Report

Stade de la Source, Orléans
Attendance: 1,095
Referee: Jan Petrik (Czech Republic)

21 November 2023
15:00

Denmark	2–1	France
Daghim 39'; O. Højlund 63'	Report	Soumahoro 3'

Stade de la Source, Orléans
Attendance: 423
Referee: Daniel Schlager (Germany)
21 November 2023
15:00

Estonia	0–3	Iceland
	Report	Andresson 49' (pen.), 68'; Thorsteinsson 61'

Stade Marcel Garcin, Orléans
Attendance: 90
Referee: Jan Petrik (Czech Republic)

==== Group 2 ====
Pos	Team	Pld	W	D	L	GF	GA	GD	Pts	Qualification
1	Norway	3	3	0	0	15	1	+14	**9**	Elite round
2	Latvia (H)	3	1	1	1	9	4	+5	**4**	Elite round
3	Hungary	3	1	1	1	8	3	+5	**4**	
4	Gibraltar	3	0	0	3	0	24	−24	**0**	

Source: UEFA
Rules for classification: Tiebreakers
(H) Hosts
11 October 2023
13:00

Norway	10–0	Gibraltar
Pedersen 22'; Egeli 24', 39'; Faraas 35', 42'; Hjertø Dahl 52'; Andresen 56'; Bang-Kittilsen 57'; Kjelsen 63', 84'	Report

LNK Sporta Parks, Riga
Attendance: 25
Referee: Michal Očenáš (Slovakia)
11 October 2023
17:00

Latvia	1–1	Hungary
Cēsnieks 55'	Report	Major 47' (pen.)

SB Arkadija, Riga
Attendance: 146
Referee: Evangelos Manouchos (Greece)

14 October 2023
13:00

Hungary	6–0	Gibraltar
Szűcs 2'; Vingler 13'; Mohos 29' (pen.), 68'; Klausz 84', 85'	Report

LNK Sporta Parks, Riga
Attendance: 37
Referee: Miloš Milanović (Serbia)
14 October 2023
17:00

Norway	3–0	Latvia
Faraas 35'; Egeli 77'; Bang-Kittilsen 89'	Report

SB Arkadija, Riga
Attendance: 218
Referee: Michal Očenáš (Slovakia)

17 October 2023
13:00

Hungary	1–2	Norway
Klausz 85'	Report	Egeli 51'; Faraas 57'

LNK Sporta Parks, Riga
Attendance: 27
Referee: Evangelos Manouchos (Greece)
17 October 2023
13:00

Gibraltar	0–8	Latvia
	Report	Grabovskis 2', 22', 31', 74'; Bočs 6'; Patrikejevs 40', 54' (pen.); Evelons 64'

SB Arkadija, Riga
Attendance: 131
Referee: Miloš Milanović (Serbia)

==== Group 3 ====
Pos	Team	Pld	W	D	L	GF	GA	GD	Pts	Qualification
1	Scotland	3	2	1	0	5	2	+3	**7**	Elite round
2	Serbia	3	1	1	1	2	2	0	**4**	Elite round
3	Andorra	3	1	0	2	3	5	−2	**3**	
4	Bulgaria (H)	3	0	2	1	1	2	−1	**2**	

Source: UEFA
Rules for classification: Tiebreakers
(H) Hosts
15 November 2023
10:00

Serbia	1–0	Andorra
Sremčević 15'	Report

Albena 1, Albena
Referee: Gustavo Correia (Portugal)
15 November 2023
13:30

Bulgaria	0–0	Scotland
	Report

Stadion Spartak, Varna
Referee: Andreas Argyrou (Cyprus)

18 November 2023
13:30

Serbia	0–0	Bulgaria
	Report

Stadion Spartak, Varna
18 November 2023
13:30

Scotland	3–1	Andorra
Wilson 35'; Sharpe 60'; Jackson 74'	Report	Carrau 49'

Albena 1, Albena

21 November 2023
13:30

Scotland	2–1	Serbia
MacKenzie 42'; Bavidge 90'	Report	Milošević 90+6'

Stadion Spartak, Varna
21 November 2023
13:30

Andorra	2–1	Bulgaria
Borra 51'; Molins 65'	Report	Georgiev 42'

Albena 1, Albena

==== Group 4 ====
Pos	Team	Pld	W	D	L	GF	GA	GD	Pts	Qualification
1	Switzerland	3	3	0	0	7	1	+6	**9**	Elite round
2	Italy	3	1	1	1	9	3	+6	**4**	Elite round
3	Sweden (H)	3	0	2	1	3	4	−1	**2**	
4	Liechtenstein	3	0	1	2	0	11	−11	**1**	

Updated to match(es) played on 18 November 2023. Source: UEFA
Rules for classification: Tiebreakers
(H) Hosts
15 November 2023
13:00

Italy	7–0	Liechtenstein
Mannini 9'; Vacca 19'; Anghelè 57', 68', 84'; Lipani 64'; Amey 66'	Report

Borås Arena, Borås
Attendance: 50
15 November 2023
18:00

Switzerland	2–1	Sweden
Henchoz 3'; Ogbus 6'	Report	Madjed 13' (pen.)

Borås Arena, Borås
Attendance: 200
Referee: Yigal Frid (Israel)

18 November 2023
13:00

Italy	0–1	Switzerland
	Report	Ligue 66'

Borås Arena, Borås
Attendance: 103
18 November 2023
18:00

Sweden	0–0	Liechtenstein
	Report

Borås Arena, Borås
Attendance: 324

21 November 2023
18:00

Sweden	2–2	Italy
Stroud 23'; Ayari 84'	Report	Pafundi 2', 52' (pen.)

Borås Arena, Borås
Attendance: 303
21 November 2023
18:00

Liechtenstein	0–4	Switzerland
	Report	Ligue 26'; Ouattara 75'; Bajrami 87'; Seiler 90+2'

Borås Arena, Borås
Referee: Damian Sylwestrzak (Poland)

==== Group 5 ====
Pos	Team	Pld	W	D	L	GF	GA	GD	Pts	Qualification
1	Germany	3	2	1	0	12	4	+8	**7**	Elite round
2	North Macedonia	3	1	1	1	4	4	0	**4 (Note: Ranked on head-to-head points: North Macedonia: 3, Poland: 0)**	Elite round
3	Poland (H)	3	1	1	1	6	5	+1	**4**	
4	Kazakhstan	3	0	1	2	1	10	−9	**1**	

Source: UEFA
Rules for classification: Tiebreakers
(H) Hosts
Notes:
11 October 2023
15:00

Germany	6–0	Kazakhstan
Lubach 25'; Pejčinović 30', 69'; Kömür 45', 60'; Bornschein 77'	Report

Stadion Miejski w Inowrocławiu, Inowrocław
Attendance: 200
Referee: Helgi Mikael Jónasson (Iceland)
11 October 2023
16:00

North Macedonia	2–0	Poland
Velichkovski 12'; Elmas 70'	Report

Stadium im. G. Duneckiego, Toruń
Attendance: 876
Referee: Tomas Klima (Czech Republic)

14 October 2023
13:15

Poland	3–0	Kazakhstan
Dziuba 24'; Śmiglewski 45+1', 59'	Report

Stadion Miejski w Inowrocławiu, Inowrocław
Attendance: 679
Referee: Helgi Mikael Jónasson (Iceland)
14 October 2023
15:30

Germany	3–1	North Macedonia
Pejčinović 57'; Bischof 67', 75'	Report	Gjorgievski 63'

Marshal Józef Piłsudski Stadium, Bydgoszcz
Attendance: 221
Referee: Sander Van Der Eijk (Netherlands)

17 October 2023
15:30

Poland	3–3	Germany
Nsangou 14' (pen.); Drachal 24', 78'	Report	Krattenmacher 22'; Pejčinović 59', 83'

Marshal Józef Piłsudski Stadium, Bydgoszcz
Attendance: 1,349
Referee: Sander Van Der Eijk (Netherlands)
17 October 2023
15:30

Kazakhstan	1–1	North Macedonia
Mukhametkhanov 25'	Report	Zendelovski 81'

Stadium im. G. Duneckiego, Toruń
Attendance: 107
Referee: Tomas Klima (Czech Republic)

==== Group 6 ====
Pos	Team	Pld	W	D	L	GF	GA	GD	Pts	Qualification
1	Spain	3	3	0	0	11	0	+11	**9**	Elite round
2	Georgia (H)	3	2	0	1	4	5	−1	**6**	Elite round
3	Cyprus	3	1	0	2	1	4	−3	**3**	
4	Moldova	3	0	0	3	1	8	−7	**0**	

Source: UEFA
Rules for classification: Tiebreakers
(H) Hosts
15 November 2023
13:00

Cyprus	0–2	Georgia
	Report	Berelidze 23'; Lordkipanidze 81'

Mikheil Meskhi Stadium, Tbilisi
Attendance: 987
Referee: Nenad Minaković (Serbia)
15 November 2023
15:00

Spain	5–0	Moldova
Keddari 34'; Gasiorowski 49', 73', 82'; Sánchez 75'	Report

Mikheil Meskhi Stadium, Tbilisi
Attendance: 42
Referee: Donald Robertson (Scotland)

18 November 2023
13:00

Georgia	2–1	Moldova
Sherozia 8' (pen.), 65'	Report	Boțan 35'

Mikheil Meskhi Stadium, Tbilisi
Attendance: 855
Referee: Nenad Minaković (Serbia)
18 November 2023
15:00

Spain	2–0	Cyprus
Senhadji 48'; Diao 88'	Report

Mikheil Meskhi Stadium, Tbilisi
Attendance: 48
Referee: Adam Ladebäck (Sweden)

21 November 2023
13:00

Georgia	0–4	Spain
	Report	Rodriguez 53'; Sánchez 57'; Carvalho 75'; Senhadji 86'

Mikheil Meskhi Stadium II, Tbilisi
Attendance: 770
Referee: Donald Robertson (Scotland)
21 November 2023
13:00

Moldova	0–1	Cyprus
	Report	Odysseos 90+1'

Mikheil Meskhi Stadium, Tbilisi
Attendance: 40
Referee: Adam Ladebäck (Sweden)

==== Group 7 ====
Pos	Team	Pld	W	D	L	GF	GA	GD	Pts	Qualification
1	Ukraine	3	2	0	1	7	5	+2	**6**	Elite round
2	Kosovo	3	1	2	0	7	3	+4	**5**	Elite round
3	Slovakia	3	1	1	1	4	5	−1	**4**	
4	Malta (H)	3	0	1	2	3	8	−5	**1**	

Source: UEFA
Rules for classification: Tiebreakers
(H) Hosts
15 November 2023
10:30

Ukraine	3–1	Malta
Manuilov 17'; Attard 71' (o.g.); Tutierov 88'	Report	Ponomarenko 59' (o.g.)

Centenary Stadium, Ta' Qali
Attendance: 171
Referee: Chrysovalantis Theouli (Cyprus)
15 November 2023
14:30

Kosovo	1–1	Slovakia
Bujupi 48' (pen.)	Report	Hájovský 22'

Centenary Stadium, Ta' Qali
Attendance: 63
Referee: Robert Schröder (Germany)

18 November 2023
11:00

Ukraine	0–4	Kosovo
	Report	Gashijan 22', 79'; Bujupi 64'; Rama 90+2'

Centenary Stadium, Ta' Qali
Attendance: 42
Referee: Vassilis Fotias (Greece)
18 November 2023
14:30

Slovakia	3–0	Malta
Rehuš 36'; Maroš 81'; Záhradník 82'	Report

Centenary Stadium, Ta' Qali
Attendance: 187
Referee: Chrysovalantis Theouli (Cyprus)

21 November 2023
11:00

Slovakia	0–4	Ukraine
	Report	Yermachkov 30'; Derkach 36'; Mykhavko 39'; Ponomarenko 84'

Centenary Stadium, Ta' Qali
Attendance: 57
Referee: Robert Schröder (Germany)
21 November 2023
14:30

Malta	2–2	Kosovo
Fenech 6'; Caruana 82' (pen.)	Report	Bujupi 39' (pen.); Gerbovci 42'

Centenary Stadium, Ta' Qali
Attendance: 133
Referee: Vassilis Fotias (Greece)

==== Group 8 ====
Pos	Team	Pld	W	D	L	GF	GA	GD	Pts	Qualification
1	Turkey (H)	3	3	0	0	7	2	+5	**9**	Elite round
2	Lithuania	3	1	0	2	4	5	−1	**3 (Note: Ranked on head-to-head goal difference: Lithuania: 1, Greece: 0, Belarus: –1.)**	Elite round
3	Greece	3	1	0	2	2	3	−1	**3**	Elite round
4	Belarus	3	1	0	2	2	5	−3	**3**	

Source: UEFA
Rules for classification: Tiebreakers
(H) Hosts
Notes:
15 November 2023
11:00

Belarus	1–0	Greece
Mialkouski 36'	Report

Arslan Zeki Demirci Sports Complex, Manavgat
Attendance: 62
Referee: Joey Kooij (Netherlands)
15 November 2023
14:00

Turkey	3–1	Lithuania
Yıldırım 10'; Sarıkaya 31', 80'	Report	Michelbrink 62'

Arslan Zeki Demirci Sports Complex, Manavgat
Attendance: 190
Referee: David Šmajc (Slovenia)

18 November 2023
11:00

Greece	2–1	Lithuania
Kontonikos 47'; Tzimas 56'	Report	Jansonas 12' (pen.)

Arslan Zeki Demirci Sports Complex, Manavgat
Attendance: 32
Referee: David Šmajc (Slovenia)
18 November 2023
14:00

Turkey	3–1	Belarus
Kılıçsoy 18', 33'; Yöntem 57'	Report	Martynov 44'

Arslan Zeki Demirci Sports Complex, Manavgat
Attendance: 172
Referee: Simone Sozza (Italy)

21 November 2023
14:00

Greece	0–1	Turkey
	Report	Kılıçsoy 45+1'

Arslan Zeki Demirci Sports Complex, Manavgat
Attendance: 183
Referee: Simone Sozza (Italy)
21 November 2023
14:00

Lithuania	2–0	Belarus
Jansonas 79', 81'	Report

Arslan Zeki Demirci Sports Complex, Manavgat
Attendance: 17
Referee: Joey Kooij (Netherlands)

==== Group 9 ====
Pos	Team	Pld	W	D	L	GF	GA	GD	Pts	Qualification
1	Israel	3	2	1	0	7	0	+7	**7**	Elite round
2	Croatia (H)	3	2	1	0	4	1	+3	**7**	Elite round
3	Faroe Islands	3	1	0	2	3	10	−7	**3**	
4	Armenia	3	0	0	3	3	6	−3	**0**	

Source: UEFA
Rules for classification: Tiebreakers
(H) Hosts
15 November 2023
12:00

Israel	6–0	Faroe Islands
Zoabi 13'; Hazan 19', 34'; Belay 66'; Dahan 77'; Ben Simon 90+7' (pen.)	Report

Veli Jože, Poreč
Attendance: 30
Referee: Jakob Alexander Sundberg (Denmark)
15 November 2023
12:30

Armenia	1–2	Croatia
Vardanyan 22'	Report	Vrbančić 66', 71'

Valbruna, Rovinj
Attendance: 115
Referee: Vitālijs Spasjoņņikovs (Latvia)

18 November 2023
12:00

Israel	1–0	Armenia
Abu Farchi 28'	Report

Veli Jože, Poreč
Attendance: 30
Referee: Mohammad Al-Emara (Finland)
18 November 2023
12:30

Croatia	2–0	Faroe Islands
Košćević 50'; Vrbančić 52'	Report

Valbruna, Rovinj
Attendance: 95
Referee: Vitālijs Spasjoņņikovs (Latvia)

21 November 2023
12:30

Croatia	0–0	Israel
	Report

Valbruna, Rovinj
Attendance: 90
Referee: Jakob Alexander Sundberg (Denmark)
21 November 2023
12:30

Faroe Islands	3–2	Armenia
Hansen 55'; Josephsen 71' (pen.), 90+3'	Report	Vardanyan 40'; Afyan 90+1'

Veli Jože, Poreč
Attendance: 15
Referee: Mohammad Al-Emara (Finland)

==== Group 10 ====
Pos	Team	Pld	W	D	L	GF	GA	GD	Pts	Qualification
1	Czech Republic (H)	3	2	1	0	6	1	+5	**7**	Elite round
2	Romania	3	1	2	0	8	1	+7	**5**	Elite round
3	Finland	3	1	1	1	8	1	+7	**4**	
4	San Marino	3	0	0	3	0	19	−19	**0**	

Source: UEFA
Rules for classification: Tiebreakers
(H) Hosts
11 October 2023
15:00

Czech Republic	4–0	San Marino
Málek 34', 49'; Horák 56'; Hranoš 76'	Report

Mestský fotbalovy, Opava
Attendance: 210
Referee: Henrik Nalbandyan (Armenia)
11 October 2023
15:00

Finland	0–0	Romania
	Report

Bazaly, Ostrava
Attendance: 68
Referee: Ante Čulina (Croatia)

14 October 2023
15:00

Czech Republic	1–0	Finland
Pudil 34'	Report

Mestský fotbalovy, Opava
Attendance: 568
Referee: Ante Čulina (Croatia)
14 October 2023
15:00

Romania	7–0	San Marino
Tudose 35'; Banu 38'; Capac 57', 90+3'; Răducan 67'; Gogescu 75'; Rădulescu 83'	Report

Bazaly, Ostrava
Attendance: 32
Referee: Miloš Savović (Montenegro)

17 October 2023
15:00

Romania	1–1	Czech Republic
Pop 47'	Report	Krulich 8'

Stovky, Frýdek-Místek
Attendance: 340
Referee: Henrik Nalbandyan (Armenia)
17 October 2023
15:00

San Marino	0–8	Finland
	Report	Toivonen 5'; Benvenuti 15' (o.g.); Hannula 31'; Bulgakov 35'; Ezeh 50', 77', 87'; Puukko 90'

Bazaly, Ostrava
Attendance: 30
Referee: Miloš Savović (Montenegro)

==== Group 11 ====
Pos	Team	Pld	W	D	L	GF	GA	GD	Pts	Qualification
1	Netherlands	3	3	0	0	7	1	+6	**9**	Elite round
2	Bosnia and Herzegovina	3	1	1	1	1	3	−2	**4**	Elite round
3	Luxembourg (H)	3	1	0	2	2	4	−2	**3**	
4	Azerbaijan	3	0	1	2	2	4	−2	**1**	

Source: UEFA
Rules for classification: Tiebreakers
(H) Hosts
15 November 2023
16:00

Azerbaijan	0–0	Bosnia and Herzegovina
	Report

Stade de la Frontière, Esch-sur-Alzette
Attendance: 50
Referee: Mikkel Redder (Denmark)
15 November 2023
18:00

Netherlands	2–0	Luxembourg
Babadi 36'; Land 43'	Report

Terrain Bousbierg Stadium, Bissen
Attendance: 726
Referee: Dzmitry Dzmitryieu (Belarus)

18 November 2023
16:00

Netherlands	2–1	Azerbaijan
Babadi 22'; Banzuzi 48'	Report	Shafiyev 86'

Terrain Poetz, Wiltz
Attendance: 163
Referee: Joonas Jaanovits (Estonia)
18 November 2023
16:00

Bosnia and Herzegovina	1–0	Luxembourg
Mustafić 9'	Report

Stade de la Frontière, Esch-sur-Alzette
Attendance: 587
Referee: Dzmitry Dzmitryieu (Belarus)

21 November 2023
18:00

Bosnia and Herzegovina	0–3	Netherlands
	Report	Banzuzi 16'; Rijkhoff 35'; Van de Haar 87'

Terrain Bousbierg Stadium, Bissen
Attendance: 203
Referee: Mikkel Redder (Denmark)
21 November 2023
18:00

Luxembourg	2–1	Azerbaijan
Videira 8'; Dardari 57'	Report	Shahniyarov 84'

Terrain Poetz, Wiltz
Attendance: 387
Referee: Joonas Jaanovits (Estonia)

==== Group 12 ====
Pos	Team	Pld	W	D	L	GF	GA	GD	Pts	Qualification
1	Austria	3	1	2	0	1	0	+1	**5**	Elite round
2	Montenegro (H)	3	1	1	1	3	1	+2	**4**	Elite round
3	England	3	0	3	0	1	1	0	**3**	
4	Wales	3	0	2	1	1	4	−3	**2**	

Source: UEFA
Rules for classification: Tiebreakers
(H) Hosts
11 October 2023
15:00

Wales	0–0	Austria
	Report

Braća Velašević Stadium, Danilovgrad
Attendance: 110
Referee: Marian Alexandru Barbu (Romania)
11 October 2023
18:00

England	0–0	Montenegro
	Report

DG Arena, Podgorica
Attendance: 850
Referee: Matthew De Gabriele (Malta)

14 October 2023
15:00

England	1–1	Wales
Esse 70'	Report	Lloyd 55'

DG Arena, Podgorica
Attendance: 100
Referee: Marian Alexandru Barbu (Romania)
14 October 2023
18:00

Austria	1–0	Montenegro
Scharner 28'	Report

Gradski Stadion, Podgorica
Attendance: 600
Referee: Ion Orlic (Moldova)

17 October 2023
18:00

Austria	0–0	England
	Report

DG Arena, Podgorica
Attendance: 50
Referee: Ion Orlic (Moldova)
17 October 2023
18:00

Montenegro	3–0	Wales
Golubović 2'; Tomašević 30'; Mrvaljević 40' (pen.)	Report

Gradski Stadion, Podgorica
Attendance: 200
Referee: Matthew De Gabriele (Malta)

==== Group 13 ====
Pos	Team	Pld	W	D	L	GF	GA	GD	Pts	Qualification
1	Belgium	3	2	1	0	4	1	+3	**7**	Elite round
2	Slovenia	3	1	2	0	2	1	+1	**5**	Elite round
3	Republic of Ireland	3	1	1	1	3	2	+1	**4**	
4	Albania (H)	3	0	0	3	1	6	−5	**0**	

Source: UEFA
Rules for classification: Tiebreakers
(H) Hosts
15 November 2023
11:00

Slovenia	1–1	Belgium
Čuber Potočnik 52' (pen.)	Report	Malić 66' (o.g.)

Arena Egnatia, Rrogozhinë
Attendance: 56
Referee: Kristoffer Hagenes (Norway)
15 November 2023
14:00

Republic of Ireland	3–1	Albania
O'Mahony 5', 56'; Umeh 59'	Report	Krasniqi 23'

Elbasan Arena, Elbasan
Attendance: 653
Referee: Miloš Bošković (Montenegro)

18 November 2023
11:00

Republic of Ireland	0–0	Slovenia
	Report

Arena Egnatia, Rrogozhinë
Attendance: 50
Referee: Miloš Gigovic (Bosnia and Herzegovina)
18 November 2023
14:00

Belgium	2–0	Albania
Fernandez-Pardo 27', 31'	Report

Elbasan Arena, Elbasan
Attendance: 500
Referee: Miloš Bošković (Montenegro)

21 November 2023
14:00

Belgium	1–0	Republic of Ireland
Degreef 46'	Report

Arena Egnatia, Rrogozhinë
Attendance: 50
Referee: Kristoffer Hagenes (Norway)
21 November 2023
14:00

Albania	0–1	Slovenia
	Report	Mačak 48'

Elbasan Arena, Elbasan
Attendance: 220
Referee: Miloš Gigovic (Bosnia and Herzegovina)

=== Ranking of third-placed teams ===
To determine the best third-placed team from the qualifying round which advance to the elite round, only the results of the third-placed teams against the first and second-placed teams in their group are taken into account.

Pos	Grp	Team	Pld	W	D	L	GF	GA	GD	Pts	Qualification
1	8	Greece	2	1	0	1	2	2	0	3	Elite Round
2	12	England	2	0	2	0	0	0	0	2	
3	4	Sweden	2	0	1	1	3	4	−1	1	
4	2	Hungary	2	0	1	1	2	3	−1	1	
5	1	Iceland	2	0	1	1	1	2	−1	1	
6	10	Finland	2	0	1	1	0	1	−1	1 (Note: Ranked on disciplinary points: Finland: –2, Republic of Ireland: –5)	
7	13	Republic of Ireland	2	0	1	1	0	1	−1	1	
8	5	Poland	2	0	1	1	3	5	−2	1	
9	7	Slovakia	2	0	1	1	1	5	−4	1	
10	3	Andorra	2	0	0	2	1	4	−3	0	
11	11	Luxembourg	2	0	0	2	0	3	−3	0	
12	6	Cyprus	2	0	0	2	0	4	−4	0	
13	9	Faroe Islands	2	0	0	2	0	8	−8	0	

Updated to match(es) played on 21 November 2023. Source: UEFA
Rules for classification: 1) points; 2) goal difference; 3) goals scored; 4) disciplinary points; 5) coefficient; 6) drawing of lots.

== Elite round ==
=== Draw ===
The draw for the elite round was held on 7 December 2023 at the UEFA headquarters in Nyon, Switzerland.

The teams were seeded according to their results in the qualifying round. Portugal which received a bye to the elite round, were automatically seeded into Pot A. Each group contains one team from Pot A, one team from Pot B, one team from Pot C, and one team from Pot D. Winners and runners-up from the same qualifying round group could not be drawn in the same group, but the best third-placed team could be drawn in the same group as winners or runners-up from the same qualifying round group.

2023/24 qualifying round results

Pot A
Team	Pos.	Pts.	GD	GS	Coef.
Portugal	Seeded	–	–	–	–
Spain	Group 6 winners	6	6	6	3.000
Netherlands	Group 11 winners	6	5	5	3.000
Norway	Group 2 winners	6	4	5	3.000
Scotland	Group 3 winners	6	3	5	3.000
Turkey	Group 8 winners	6	3	4	3.000
Switzerland	Group 4 winners	6	2	3	3.000

Pot B
Team	Pos.	Pts.	GD	GS	Coef.
Israel	Group 9 winners	4	6	6	2.000
Germany	Group 5 winners	4	2	6	2.000
Denmark	Group 1 winners	4	1	3	2.000
Czech Republic	Group 10 winners	4	1	2	2.000
Belgium	Group 13 winners	4	1	2	2.000
Austria	Group 12 winners	4	1	1	2.000
Ukraine	Group 7 winners	3	0	4	1.500

2023/24 qualifying round results

Pot C
Team	Pos.	Pts.	GD	GS	Coef.
Kosovo	Group 7 runners-up	4	4	5	2.000
Croatia	Group 9 runners-up	4	2	2	2.000
North Macedonia	Group 5 runners-up	3	0	3	1.500
France	Group 1 runners-up	3	0	2	1.500
Serbia	Group 3 runners-up	3	0	2	1.500
Georgia	Group 6 runners-up	3	-2	2	1.500
Bosnia and Herzegovina	Group 11 runners-up	3	-2	1	1.500

Pot D
Team	Pos.	Pts.	GD	GS	Coef.
Romania	Group 10 runners-up	2	0	1	1.000
Slovenia	Group 13 runners-up	2	0	1	1.000
Italy	Group 4 runners-up	1	-1	2	0.500
Montenegro	Group 12 runners-up	1	-1	0	0.500
Latvia	Group 2 runners-up	1	-3	1	0.500
Lithuania	Group 8 runners-up	0	-3	2	0.000
Greece	Group 8 third-place	3	0	2	1.500

=== Group 1 ===
Pos	Team	Pld	W	D	L	GF	GA	GD	Pts	Promotion
1	Spain	3	2	1	0	5	3	+2	7	Qualified for the final tournament
2	Slovenia (H)	3	1	1	1	3	3	0	4	
3	Kosovo	3	1	0	2	2	4	−2	3 (Note: Head to head points: Kosovo 3, Austria 0.)	
4	Austria	3	1	0	2	3	3	0	3	

Source: UEFA
Rules for classification: Qualification tiebreakers
(H) Hosts
Notes:
20 March 2024
16:00

Spain	1–1	Slovenia
Belaid 63'	Report	Mačak 20'

Lendava Sports Park, Lendava
Attendance: 388
Referee: Ishmael Barbara (Malta)
20 March 2024
16:00

Kosovo	1–0	Austria
Schöller 49' (o.g.)	Report

Gornja Radgona Stadium, Gornja Radgona
Attendance: 120
Referee: Andreas Argyrou (Cyprus)

23 March 2024
16:00

Spain	2–1	Kosovo
Muñoz 34'; Fortuny 51'	Report	Bujupi 77'

Gornja Radgona Stadium, Gornja Radgona
Attendance: 333
Referee: Andreas Argyrou (Cyprus)
23 March 2024
16:00

Austria	2–0	Slovenia
Trummer 31', 85'	Report

Lendava Sports Park, Lendava
Attendance: 418
Referee: Dominik Stary (Czech Republic)

26 March 2024
12:00

Austria	1–2	Spain
González 82' (o.g.)	Report	Diao 10'; Keddari 63'

Gornja Radgona Stadium, Gornja Radgona
Attendance: 290
Referee: Ishmael Barbara (Malta)
26 March 2024
12:00

Slovenia	2–0	Kosovo
Čuber Potočnik 40'; Jevšenak 87'	Report

Lendava Sports Park, Lendava
Attendance: 280
Referee: Dominik Stary (Czech Republic)

=== Group 2 ===
Pos	Team	Pld	W	D	L	GF	GA	GD	Pts	Promotion
1	France	3	2	0	1	3	2	+1	6 (Note: Head to head points: France 3, Belgium 0.)	Qualified for the final tournament
2	Belgium	3	2	0	1	5	4	+1	6	
3	Netherlands (H)	3	1	0	2	6	4	+2	3 (Note: Head to head points: Netherlands 3, Lithuania 0.)	
4	Lithuania	3	1	0	2	2	6	−4	3	

Source: UEFA
Rules for classification: Qualification tiebreakers
(H) Hosts
Notes:
20 March 2024
19:00

Netherlands	4–0	Lithuania
van Duiven 15'; Kleijn 18', 22'; Rijkhoff 41'	Report

De Langeleegte, Veendam
Attendance: 4,137
Referee: Kevin O'Sullivan (Republic of Ireland)
20 March 2024
19:00

France	2–0	Belgium
Mayulu 15'; Tel 32' (pen.)	Report

Sportpark Marsdijk, Assen
Attendance: 428
Referee: Stefan Ebner (Austria)

23 March 2024
16:00

Netherlands	0–1	France
	Report	Tel 52' (pen.)

Sportpark Marsdijk, Assen
Attendance: 3,826
Referee: Ante Čulina (Croatia)
23 March 2024
13:00

Belgium	2–0	Lithuania
Fernandez-Pardo 52'; Noubi 84' (pen.)	Report

De Langeleegte, Veendam
Attendance: 404
Referee: Kevin O'Sullivan (Republic of Ireland)

26 March 2024
19:00

Belgium	3–2	Netherlands
Piedfort 45+6'; Corbanie 57'; Sishuba 83'	Report	Van Duiven 40'; Slory 69'

De Langeleegte, Veendam
Attendance: 6,089
Referee: Stefan Ebner (Austria)
26 March 2024
19:00

Lithuania	2–0	France
Gudelevičius 3', 6'	Report

Sportpark Marsdijk, Assen
Attendance: 128
Referee: Ante Čulina (Croatia)

=== Group 3 ===
Pos	Team	Pld	W	D	L	GF	GA	GD	Pts	Promotion
1	Norway (H)	3	2	1	0	6	3	+3	7	Qualified for the final tournament
2	Bosnia and Herzegovina	3	1	1	1	5	6	−1	4	
3	Montenegro	3	1	0	2	4	5	−1	3 (Note: Head to head points: Montenegro 3, Israel 0.)	
4	Israel	3	1	0	2	2	3	−1	3	

Source: UEFA
Rules for classification: Qualification tiebreakers
(H) Hosts
Notes:
20 March 2024
15:00

Norway	2–1	Montenegro
Tomašević 9' (o.g.); Bang-Kittilsen 14'	Report	Adžić 81'

Odd Stadion, Skien
Attendance: 100
Referee: Mikkel Redder (Denmark)
20 March 2024
19:00

Bosnia and Herzegovina	0–2	Israel
	Report	Porat Ayash 64'; Abu Farchi 67' (pen.)

Odd Stadion, Skien
Attendance: 60
Referee: Alessandro Dudic (Switzerland)

23 March 2024
15:00

Norway	2–2	Bosnia and Herzegovina
Nypan 62'; Egeli 65'	Report	Mustafić 13'; Bejdić 90'

Odd Stadion, Skien
Attendance: 128
Referee: Edgars Maļcevs (Latvia)
23 March 2024
19:00

Israel	0–1	Montenegro
	Report	Adžić 90+6'

Odd Stadion, Skien
Attendance: 50
Referee: Mikkel Redder (Denmark)

26 March 2024
15:00

Israel	0–2	Norway
	Report	Egeli 3', 27'

Odd Stadion, Skien
Attendance: 75
Referee: Edgars Maļcevs (Latvia)
26 March 2024

Montenegro	2–3	Bosnia and Herzegovina
Perović 10'; Mrvaljević 45'	Report	Zahirović 52' (pen.), 80'; Muharemović 69'

Odd Stadion, Skien
Attendance: 50
Referee: Alessandro Dudic (Switzerland)

=== Group 4 ===
Pos	Team	Pld	W	D	L	GF	GA	GD	Pts	Promotion
1	Denmark	3	3	0	0	7	2	+5	9	Qualified for the final tournament
2	Portugal (H)	3	2	0	1	6	4	+2	6	
3	Greece	3	0	1	2	5	7	−2	1	
4	Serbia	3	0	1	2	5	10	−5	1	

Source: UEFA
Rules for classification: Qualification tiebreakers
(H) Hosts
20 March 2024
15:00

Serbia	1–3	Denmark
Đekić 49'	Report	Andreasen 20', 84'; Schwartau 86'

Municipal da Tabua, Tábua
Attendance: 240
Referee: Roman Jitari (Moldova)
20 March 2024
19:00

Portugal	2–1	Greece
Ribeiro 34'; Varela 88'	Report	Alexiou 79'

Estádio Municipal de Aveiro, Aveiro
Attendance: 455
Referee: Mohammad Usman Aslam (Norway)

23 March 2024
16:00

Denmark	2–1	Greece
Nybo 24'; Simmelhack 80'	Report	Kaloskamis 62'

Stadium Eng°. Sílvio Henriques Cerveira, Anadia
Attendance: 388
Referee: Roman Jitari (Moldova)
23 March 2024
21:00

Portugal	4–1	Serbia
Semedo 26', 59'; Ribeiro 45+1'; Mendonça 70'	Report	Stanković 90+3'

Estádio Municipal de Aveiro, Aveiro
Attendance: 912
Referee: David Dickinson (Scotland)

26 March 2024
16:00

Denmark	2–0	Portugal
Jørgensen 61'; Højlund 70'	Report

Estádio Cidade de Coimbra, Coimbra
Attendance: 864
Referee: David Dickinson (Scotland)
26 March 2024
16:00

Greece	3–3	Serbia
Alexiou 59', 78'; Kaloskamis 72' (pen.)	Report	Serafimović 2'; Šljivić 48', 88'

Municipal da Tabua, Tábua
Attendance: 85

=== Group 5 ===
Pos	Team	Pld	W	D	L	GF	GA	GD	Pts	Promotion
1	Italy (H)	3	3	0	0	10	2	+8	9	Qualified for the final tournament
2	Czech Republic	3	2	0	1	4	2	+2	6	
3	Georgia	3	1	0	2	3	8	−5	3	
4	Scotland	3	0	0	3	3	8	−5	0	

Source: UEFA
Rules for classification: Qualification tiebreakers
(H) Hosts
20 March 2024
12:00

Georgia	0–1	Czech Republic
	Report	Toman 4'

Polisportivo Giuseppe Morigi, Manzano
Attendance: 121
Referee: Menelaos Antoniou (Cyprus)
20 March 2024
15:00

Scotland	1–3	Italy
Watson 75'	Report	Zeroli 25'; Pafundi 70'; Romano 84'

Stadio Guido Teghil, Lignano Sabbiadoro
Attendance: 550
Referee: Patrik Kolarić (Croatia)

23 March 2024
12:00

Scotland	2–3	Georgia
Wilson 11'; Wales 66'	Report	Berelidze 45+1'; Basiladze 55'; Lordkipanidze 70'

Polisportivo Giuseppe Morigi, Manzano
Attendance: 134
Referee: Miloš Milanović (Serbia)
23 March 2024
16:30

Czech Republic	1–2	Italy
Míšek 71'	Report	Pafundi 18'; Lipani 32'

Stadio Friuli, Udine
Attendance: 2,856
Referee: Patrik Kolarić (Croatia)

26 March 2024
14:30

Czech Republic	2–0	Scotland
Planka 25'; Hranoš 58'	Report

Polisportivo Giuseppe Morigi, Manzano
Attendance: 79
Referee: Menelaos Antoniou (Cyprus)
26 March 2024
14:30

Italy	5–0	Georgia
Pafundi 4' (pen.); Palestra 22'; Zeroli 32'; Sia 67'; Di Maggio 80'	Report

Stadio Guido Teghil, Lignano Sabbiadoro
Attendance: 516
Referee: Miloš Milanović (Serbia)

=== Group 6 ===
Pos	Team	Pld	W	D	L	GF	GA	GD	Pts	Promotion
1	Turkey	3	2	0	1	4	3	+1	6 (Note: Head to head points: Turkey 3, Romania 0.)	Qualified for the final tournament
2	Romania	3	2	0	1	4	4	0	6	
3	Croatia (H)	3	1	0	2	3	4	−1	3 (Note: Head to head points: Croatia 3, Germany 0.)	
4	Germany	3	1	0	2	5	5	0	3	

Source: UEFA
Rules for classification: Qualification tiebreakers
(H) Hosts
Notes:
20 March 2024
12:30

Turkey	2–0	Romania
Gulasi 82'; Özdemir 90+2'	Report

Town stadium, Vrbovec
Attendance: 300
Referee: Bastien Dechepy (France)
20 March 2024
15:30

Croatia	2–1	Germany
Pavić 7'; Brajković 41'	Report	Maza 32'

Stadion Varteks, Varaždin
Attendance: 350
Referee: Andrea Colombo (Italy)

23 March 2024
12:30

Germany	2–3	Romania
Pejčinović 30', 62'	Report	Dulcea 28'; Stan 43'; Mazilu 90+4'

Town stadium, Vrbovec
Attendance: 250
Referee: Andrea Colombo (Italy)
23 March 2024
15:30

Turkey	2–1	Croatia
Yildirim 5'; Uzun 10'	Report	Košćević 50'

Stadion Varteks, Varaždin
Attendance: 300
Referee: Jovan Kachevski (North Macedonia)

26 March 2024
14:00

Germany	2–0	Turkey
Marino 28'; Pejčinović 88'	Report

Town stadium, Vrbovec
Attendance: 100
Referee: Bastien Dechepy (France)
26 March 2024
14:00

Romania	1–0	Croatia
Pop 73'	Report

Stadion Varteks, Varaždin
Attendance: 150
Referee: Jovan Kachevski (North Macedonia)

=== Group 7 ===
Pos	Team	Pld	W	D	L	GF	GA	GD	Pts	Promotion
1	Ukraine	3	3	0	0	8	0	+8	9	Qualified for the final tournament
2	Switzerland	3	2	0	1	3	3	0	6	
3	Latvia	3	0	1	2	1	5	−4	1 (Note: Ranked on disciplinary points: Latvia: –7, North Macedonia: –10)	
4	North Macedonia (H)	3	0	1	2	1	5	−4	1	

Source: UEFA
Rules for classification: Qualification tiebreakers
(H) Hosts
Notes:
20 March 2024
14:00

Switzerland	1–0	Latvia
Lüthi 90'	Report

Gjorče Petrov Stadium, Skopje
Attendance: 65
Referee: Granit Maqedonci (Sweden)
20 March 2024
14:00

North Macedonia	0–2	Ukraine
	Report	Krevsun 45+1'; Ponomarenko 48'

Petar Miloševski Training Centre, Skopje
Attendance: 315
Referee: Marek Radina (Czech Republic)

23 March 2024
14:00

Switzerland	2–0	North Macedonia
Ligue 12'; Beney 80'	Report

Petar Miloševski Training Centre, Skopje
Attendance: 300
Referee: Ion Orlic (Moldova)
23 March 2024
14:00

Ukraine	3–0	Latvia
Ponomarenko 34', 60' (pen.); Tutierov 89'	Report

Gjorče Petrov Stadium, Skopje
Attendance: 115
Referee: Marek Radina (Czech Republic)

26 March 2024
14:00

Ukraine	3–0	Switzerland
Synchuk 63'; Ponomarenko 68', 78'	Report

Gjorče Petrov Stadium, Skopje
Attendance: 85
Referee: Granit Maqedonci (Sweden)
26 March 2024
14:00

Latvia	1–1	North Macedonia
Mežsargs 59'	Report	Danev 76'

Petar Miloševski Training Centre, Skopje
Attendance: 100
Referee: Ion Orlic (Moldova)

== Goalscorers ==
In the qualifying round, there have been 212 goals scored in 78 matches, for an average of 2.72 goals per match (as of 21 November 2023).

In the elite round there have been 126 goals scored in 42 matches, for an average of 3 goals per match (as of 15 March 2024).

In total, there have been 338 goals scored in 120 matches, for an average of 2.82 goals per match (as of 15 March 2024).

8 goals

- (Germany) Dženan Pejčinović

7 goals

- (Norway) Vetle Walle Egeli

6 goals

- (Ukraine) Matviy Ponomarenko

5 goals

- (Italy) Simone Pafundi

4 goals

- (Kosovo) Eliot Bujupi
- (Latvia) Kristaps Grabovskis
- (Norway) Benjamin Faraas
- (Spain) Yarek Gasiorowski

3 goals

- (Belgium) Matias Fernandez-Pardo
- (Croatia) Luka Vrbančić
- (Denmark) Valdemar Andreasen
- (Finland) David Ezeh
- (Greece) Christos Alexiou
- (Hungary) Milán Klausz
- (Italy) Lorenzo Anghelè
- (Lithuania) Romualdas Jansonas
- (Norway) Bork Bang-Kittilsen
- (Switzerland) Calixte Ligue
- (Turkey) Semih Kılıçsoy

2 goals

- (Armenia) Edik Vardanyan
- (Austria) Tim Trummer
- (Bosnia and Herzegovina) Senad Mustafić
- (Bosnia and Herzegovina) Amar Zahirović
- (Croatia) Zlatan Košćević
- (Czech Republic) Vojtěk Hranoš
- (Czech Republic) Michal Málek
- (Denmark) Aske Andrésen
- (Faroe Islands) Jóhan Josephsen
- (France) Mathys Tel
- (Georgia (country)) Tsotne Berelidze
- (Georgia (country)) Dachi Lordkipanidze
- (Georgia (country)) Lukas Sherozia
- (Germany) Tom Bischof
- (Germany) Mert Kömür
- (Greece) Dimitrios Kaloskamis
- (Hungary) Barnabás Mohos
- (Iceland) Benony Breki Andresson
- (Israel) Sayed Abu Farchi
- (Israel) Liran Hazan
- (Italy) Luca Lipani
- (Italy) Kevin Zeroli
- (Kosovo) Elvir Gashijan
- (Latvia) Ivans Patrikejevs
- (Lithuania) Ernestas Gudelevičius
- (Montenegro) Vasilije Adžić
- (Montenegro) Balša Mrvaljević
- (Netherlands) Isaac Babadi
- (Netherlands) Ezechiel Banzuzi
- (Netherlands) Jason van Duiven
- (Netherlands) Mike Kleijn
- (Netherlands) Julian Rijkhoff
- (Norway) Aleksander Kjelsen
- (Poland) Dawid Drachal
- (Poland) Kacper Śmiglewski
- (Portugal) Rodrigo Ribeiro
- (Portugal) Vivaldo Semedo
- (Republic of Ireland) Mark O'Mahony
- (Romania) Alexandru Capac
- (Romania) Rares Pop
- (Scotland) Malachi Sharpe
- (Scotland) Rory Wilson
- (Serbia) Jovan Šljivić
- (Slovenia) Lucas Mačak
- (Slovenia) Jaka Čuber Potočnik
- (Spain) Siren Diao
- (Spain) Simo Keddari
- (Spain) Kevin Sánchez
- (Spain) Yanis Senhadji
- (Turkey) Efe Sarıkaya
- (Turkey) Engin Yıldırım
- (Ukraine) Timur Tutierov

1 goal

- (Albania) Erald Krasniqi
- (Andorra) Marcel Carrau
- (Andorra) Biel Borra
- (Andorra) Alex Cornella Molins
- (Armenia) Vyacheslav Afyan
- (Austria) Benedict Scharner
- (Azerbaijan) Sadiq Shafiyev
- (Azerbaijan) Shahin Shahniyarov
- (Belarus) Timofey Martynov
- (Belarus) Ruslan Mialkouski
- (Belgium) Tristan Degreef
- (Bulgaria) Martin Georgiev
- (Cyprus) Michael Odysseos
- (Czech Republic) Roman Horák
- (Czech Republic) Matouš Krulich
- (Czech Republic) Adam Pudil
- (Denmark) Clement Bischoff
- (Denmark) Adam Daghim
- (Denmark) Victor Froholdt
- (Denmark) Oscar Højlund
- (England) Romain Esse
- (Faroe Islands) Tobias Elmelund Hansen
- (Finland) Danila Bulgakov
- (Finland) Otto Hannula
- (Finland) Akseli Puukko
- (Finland) Aaro Toivonen
- (France) Désiré Doué
- (France) Jérémy Jacquet
- (France) Aboubaka Soumahoro
- (Germany) Lukas Bornschein
- (Germany) Maurice Krattenmacher
- (Germany) Rafael Lubach
- (Greece) Vasilis Kontonikos
- (Greece) Stefanos Tzimas
- (Hungary) Marcell Major
- (Hungary) Tamás Szűcs
- (Hungary) László Vingler
- (Iceland) Dagur Örn Fjeldsted
- (Iceland) Agust Orri Thorsteinsson
- (Israel) Yehuda Belay
- (Israel) Eden Ben Simon
- (Israel) Omer David Dahan
- (Israel) Karem Zoabi
- (Italy) Wisdom Amey
- (Italy) Mattia Mannini
- (Italy) Alessio Vacca
- (Kazakhstan) Zhansultan Mukhametkhanov
- (Kosovo) Dior Gerbovci
- (Kosovo) Elmedin Rama
- (Latvia) Roberts Bočs
- (Latvia) Kevins Cēsnieks
- (Latvia) Emīls Evelons
- (Lithuania) Lukas Michelbrink
- (Luxembourg) Aiman Dardari
- (Luxembourg) Jayson Videira
- (Malta) Lucas Caruana
- (Malta) Matthias Fenech
- (Moldova) Dan-Angelo Boțan
- (Montenegro) Stefan Golubović
- (Montenegro) Bodin Tomašević
- (Netherlands) Jesse van de Haar
- (Netherlands) Tygo Land
- (North Macedonia) Muhamed Elmas
- (North Macedonia) Martin Gjorgievski
- (North Macedonia) Nikola Velichkovski
- (North Macedonia) Adrian Zendelovski
- (Norway) Aleksander Andresen
- (Norway) Jens Hjertø-Dahl
- (Norway) Mats Pedersen
- (Poland) Maksymilian Dziuba
- (Poland) Junior Nsangou
- (Republic of Ireland) Franco Umeh
- (Romania) Luca Banu
- (Romania) George Gogescu
- (Romania) Alexandru Răducan
- (Romania) Mihnea Rădulescu
- (Romania) Mario Tudose
- (Scotland) Alfie Bavidge
- (Scotland) Louis Jackson
- (Scotland) Magnus MacKenzie
- (Serbia) Jovan Milošević
- (Serbia) Uroš Sremčević
- (Slovakia) Tadeáš Hájovský
- (Slovakia) Alexej Maroš
- (Slovakia) Milan Rehuš
- (Slovakia) Zoran Záhradník
- (Spain) Miguel Carvalho
- (Spain) Dani Rodríguez
- (Sweden) Taha Ayari
- (Sweden) Montader Madjed
- (Sweden) Adam Stroud
- (Switzerland) Labinot Bajrami
- (Switzerland) Sonny Henchoz
- (Switzerland) Ifechukwu Ogbus
- (Switzerland) Tiemoko Ouattara
- (Switzerland) Mats Seiler
- (Turkey) Furkan Yöntem
- (Ukraine) Maksym Derkach
- (Ukraine) Bohdan Manuylov
- (Ukraine) Taras Mykhavko
- (Ukraine) Ivan Yermachkov
- (Wales) Ben Lloyd

1 own goal

- (Iceland) Ásgeir Holgi Orrason (against France)
- (Malta) Ensell Attard (against Ukraine)
- (San Marino) Tommaso Benvenuti (against Finland)
- (Slovenia) Arjan Malić (against Belgium)
- (Ukraine) Matviy Ponomarenko (against Malta)
