= 2021 UEFA European Under-19 Championship qualification =

Tournament details
- Dates: Cancelled (Originally Qualifying round: March 2021; Elite round: Abolished; Play-offs: May 2021)
- Teams: 53 (from 1 confederation)

The 2021 UEFA European Under-19 Championship qualifying competition was a men's under-19 football competition that would have determined the seven teams joining the automatically qualified hosts Romania in the 2021 UEFA European Under-19 Championship final tournament. Players born on or after 1 January 2002 were eligible to participate.

Apart from Romania, 53 of the remaining 54 UEFA member national teams entered the qualifying competition, where the original format consisted of two rounds: Qualifying round, which would have taken place in autumn 2020, and Elite round, which would also have take place in spring 2021. However, due to the COVID-19 pandemic in Europe, UEFA announced on 13 August 2020 that after consultation with the 55 member associations, the qualifying round was delayed to March 2021, and the elite round was abolished and replaced by play-offs, with the 13 qualifying round group winners joining the top seed by coefficient ranking, Portugal (which originally received a bye to the elite round), in the play-offs in May 2021 to determine the teams qualifying for the final tournament.

On 23 February 2021, UEFA announced that, due to the COVID-19 pandemic in Europe and its effect on staging competitions, the tournament was cancelled.

== Format ==
The qualifying competition originally consisted of the following two rounds:

- Qualifying round: Apart from Portugal, which receive a bye to the elite round as the teams with the highest seeding coefficient, the remaining 52 teams were drawn into 13 groups of four teams. Each group was to be played in single round-robin format at one of the teams selected as hosts after the draw. The 13 group winners, the 13 runners-up, and the third-placed team with the best record against the first and second-placed teams in their group were to advance to the elite round.
- Elite round: The 28 teams were to be drawn into seven groups of four teams. Each group was to be played in single round-robin format at one of the teams selected as hosts after the draw. The seven group winners were to qualify for the final tournament.

After the format change, the qualifying competition would have consisted of the following two rounds:

- Qualifying round: The draw remained the same as before. The 13 group winners and Portugal, which originally received a bye to the elite round, would have advanced to the play-offs.
- Play-offs: The 14 teams were to be drawn into seven ties. The seven winners would have qualified for the final tournament.

== Qualifying round ==
=== Draw ===
The draw for the qualifying round was held on 3 December 2019, 10:00 CET (UTC+1), at the UEFA headquarters in Nyon, Switzerland.

The teams were seeded according to their coefficient ranking, calculated based on the following:

- 2016 UEFA European Under-19 Championship final tournament and qualifying competition (qualifying round and elite round)
- 2017 UEFA European Under-19 Championship final tournament and qualifying competition (qualifying round and elite round)
- 2018 UEFA European Under-19 Championship final tournament and qualifying competition (qualifying round and elite round)
- 2019 UEFA European Under-19 Championship final tournament and qualifying competition (qualifying round and elite round)

Each group contained one team from Pot A, one team from Pot B, one team from Pot C, and one team from Pot D. Based on the decisions taken by the UEFA Emergency Panel, the following pairs of teams could not be drawn in the same group: Spain and Gibraltar, Ukraine and Russia, Serbia and Kosovo, Russia and Kosovo, Bosnia and Herzegovina and Kosovo.

Final tournament hosts: Team / Coeff. / Rank; Romania / 8.833 / —	Bye to elite round: Team / Coeff. / Rank; Portugal / 29.389 / 1

Teams entering qualifying round

Pot A
Team	Coeff.	Rank
France	23.778	2
England	23.000	3
Italy	21.889	4
Netherlands	16.778	5
Czech Republic	16.722	6
Spain	16.222	7
Germany	15.833	8
Ukraine	14.389	9
Republic of Ireland	13.278	10
Norway	12.611	11
Turkey	12.611	12
Austria	11.833	13
Croatia	11.611	14

Pot B
Team	Coeff.	Rank
Greece	11.000	15
Belgium	10.667	16
Sweden	10.278	17
Serbia	10.167	18
Poland	10.167	19
Slovakia	10.167	20
Scotland	9.833	21
Israel	9.833	22
Bulgaria	9.722	23
Hungary	9.167	24
Denmark	8.833	25
Slovenia	8.167	26
Georgia	7.833	27

Pot C
Team	Coeff.	Rank
Russia	7.333	28
Finland	7.333	29
Switzerland	7.000	30
Bosnia and Herzegovina	6.667	31
Cyprus	5.333	32
Wales	5.000	33
Latvia	4.667	34
Iceland	4.667	35
Azerbaijan	4.500	36
North Macedonia	4.333	37
Northern Ireland	4.333	38
Belarus	4.333	39
Armenia	3.667	40

Pot D
Team	Coeff.	Rank
Montenegro	3.333	41
Kosovo	3.167	42
Malta	2.333	43
Albania	2.000	44
Kazakhstan	1.667	45
Andorra	1.667	46
Luxembourg	1.667	47
Moldova	1.333	48
Estonia	1.333	49
Faroe Islands	1.333	50
Lithuania	1.000	51
Gibraltar	0.333	52
San Marino	0.000	53

Did not enter
Liechtenstein

=== Groups ===
The qualifying round was originally scheduled to be completed by 17 November 2020. However, due to the COVID-19 pandemic in Europe, UEFA announced on 13 August 2020 that after consultation with the 55 member associations, the qualifying round was delayed to March 2021, before its cancellation earlier in February.

==== Group 1 ====
Originally scheduled to be played between 11–17 November 2020.

Pos	Team	Pld	W	D	L	GF	GA	GD	Pts
1	Italy	0	0	0	0	0	0	0	0
2	Slovakia (H)	0	0	0	0	0	0	0	0
3	Cyprus	0	0	0	0	0	0	0	0
4	Kosovo	0	0	0	0	0	0	0	0

Source: UEFA
Rules for classification: Tiebreakers
(H) Hosts
March 2021

Italy	Cancelled	Kosovo
	Report

March 2021

Cyprus	Cancelled	Slovakia
	Report

March 2021

Italy	Cancelled	Cyprus
	Report

March 2021

Slovakia	Cancelled	Kosovo
	Report

March 2021

Slovakia	Cancelled	Italy
	Report

March 2021

Kosovo	Cancelled	Cyprus
	Report

==== Group 2 ====
Originally scheduled to be played between 10–16 November 2020.

Pos	Team	Pld	W	D	L	GF	GA	GD	Pts
1	Ukraine	0	0	0	0	0	0	0	0
2	Israel (H)	0	0	0	0	0	0	0	0
3	Belarus	0	0	0	0	0	0	0	0
4	Montenegro	0	0	0	0	0	0	0	0

Source: UEFA
Rules for classification: Tiebreakers
(H) Hosts
March 2021

Ukraine	Cancelled	Montenegro
	Report

March 2021

Belarus	Cancelled	Israel
	Report

March 2021

Ukraine	Cancelled	Belarus
	Report

March 2021

Israel	Cancelled	Montenegro
	Report

March 2021

Israel	Cancelled	Ukraine
	Report

March 2021

Montenegro	Cancelled	Belarus
	Report

==== Group 3 ====
Originally scheduled to be played between 11–17 November 2020.

Pos	Team	Pld	W	D	L	GF	GA	GD	Pts
1	Austria	0	0	0	0	0	0	0	0
2	Sweden (H)	0	0	0	0	0	0	0	0
3	Northern Ireland	0	0	0	0	0	0	0	0
4	Gibraltar	0	0	0	0	0	0	0	0

Source: UEFA
Rules for classification: Tiebreakers
(H) Hosts
March 2021

Austria	Cancelled	Gibraltar
	Report

March 2021

Northern Ireland	Cancelled	Sweden
	Report

March 2021

Austria	Cancelled	Northern Ireland
	Report

March 2021

Sweden	Cancelled	Gibraltar
	Report

March 2021

Sweden	Cancelled	Austria
	Report

March 2021

Gibraltar	Cancelled	Northern Ireland
	Report

==== Group 4 ====
Originally scheduled to be played between 11–17 November 2020.

Pos	Team	Pld	W	D	L	GF	GA	GD	Pts
1	Germany	0	0	0	0	0	0	0	0
2	Scotland	0	0	0	0	0	0	0	0
3	Switzerland (H)	0	0	0	0	0	0	0	0
4	Luxembourg	0	0	0	0	0	0	0	0

Source: UEFA
Rules for classification: Tiebreakers
(H) Hosts
March 2021

Germany	Cancelled	Luxembourg
	Report

March 2021

Switzerland	Cancelled	Scotland
	Report

March 2021

Germany	Cancelled	Switzerland
	Report

March 2021

Scotland	Cancelled	Luxembourg
	Report

March 2021

Scotland	Cancelled	Germany
	Report

March 2021

Luxembourg	Cancelled	Switzerland
	Report

==== Group 5 ====
Originally scheduled to be played between 7–13 October 2020.

Pos	Team	Pld	W	D	L	GF	GA	GD	Pts
1	Czech Republic (H)	0	0	0	0	0	0	0	0
2	Denmark	0	0	0	0	0	0	0	0
3	North Macedonia	0	0	0	0	0	0	0	0
4	Albania	0	0	0	0	0	0	0	0

Source: UEFA
Rules for classification: Tiebreakers
(H) Hosts
March 2021

Czech Republic	Cancelled	Albania
	Report

March 2021

North Macedonia	Cancelled	Denmark
	Report

March 2021

Czech Republic	Cancelled	North Macedonia
	Report

March 2021

Denmark	Cancelled	Albania
	Report

March 2021

Denmark	Cancelled	Czech Republic
	Report

March 2021

Albania	Cancelled	North Macedonia
	Report

==== Group 6 ====
Originally scheduled to be played between 11–17 November 2020.

Pos	Team	Pld	W	D	L	GF	GA	GD	Pts
1	Croatia (H)	0	0	0	0	0	0	0	0
2	Georgia	0	0	0	0	0	0	0	0
3	Latvia	0	0	0	0	0	0	0	0
4	Kazakhstan	0	0	0	0	0	0	0	0

Source: UEFA
Rules for classification: Tiebreakers
(H) Hosts
March 2021

Croatia	Cancelled	Kazakhstan
	Report

March 2021

Latvia	Cancelled	Georgia
	Report

March 2021

Croatia	Cancelled	Latvia
	Report

March 2021

Georgia	Cancelled	Kazakhstan
	Report

March 2021

Georgia	Cancelled	Croatia
	Report

March 2021

Kazakhstan	Cancelled	Latvia
	Report

==== Group 7 ====
Originally scheduled to be played between 11–17 November 2020.

Pos	Team	Pld	W	D	L	GF	GA	GD	Pts
1	Republic of Ireland (H)	0	0	0	0	0	0	0	0
2	Poland	0	0	0	0	0	0	0	0
3	Bosnia and Herzegovina	0	0	0	0	0	0	0	0
4	Estonia	0	0	0	0	0	0	0	0

Source: UEFA
Rules for classification: Tiebreakers
(H) Hosts
March 2021

Republic of Ireland	Cancelled	Estonia
	Report

March 2021

Bosnia and Herzegovina	Cancelled	Poland
	Report

March 2021

Republic of Ireland	Cancelled	Bosnia and Herzegovina
	Report

March 2021

Poland	Cancelled	Estonia
	Report

March 2021

Poland	Cancelled	Republic of Ireland
	Report

March 2021

Estonia	Cancelled	Bosnia and Herzegovina
	Report

==== Group 8 ====
Originally scheduled to be played between 7–13 October 2020.

Pos	Team	Pld	W	D	L	GF	GA	GD	Pts
1	France	0	0	0	0	0	0	0	0
2	Greece	0	0	0	0	0	0	0	0
3	Azerbaijan	0	0	0	0	0	0	0	0
4	Moldova (H)	0	0	0	0	0	0	0	0

Source: UEFA
Rules for classification: Tiebreakers
(H) Hosts
March 2021

France	Cancelled	Moldova
	Report

March 2021

Azerbaijan	Cancelled	Greece
	Report

March 2021

France	Cancelled	Azerbaijan
	Report

March 2021

Greece	Cancelled	Moldova
	Report

March 2021

Greece	Cancelled	France
	Report

March 2021

Moldova	Cancelled	Azerbaijan
	Report

==== Group 9 ====
Originally scheduled to be played between 7–13 October 2020.

Pos	Team	Pld	W	D	L	GF	GA	GD	Pts
1	Norway (H)	0	0	0	0	0	0	0	0
2	Hungary	0	0	0	0	0	0	0	0
3	Iceland	0	0	0	0	0	0	0	0
4	Andorra	0	0	0	0	0	0	0	0

Source: UEFA
Rules for classification: Tiebreakers
(H) Hosts
March 2021

Norway	Cancelled	Andorra
	Report

March 2021

Iceland	Cancelled	Hungary
	Report

March 2021

Norway	Cancelled	Iceland
	Report

March 2021

Hungary	Cancelled	Andorra
	Report

March 2021

Hungary	Cancelled	Norway
	Report

March 2021

Andorra	Cancelled	Iceland
	Report

==== Group 10 ====
Originally scheduled to be played between 11–17 November 2020.

Pos	Team	Pld	W	D	L	GF	GA	GD	Pts
1	England	0	0	0	0	0	0	0	0
2	Slovenia	0	0	0	0	0	0	0	0
3	Wales (H)	0	0	0	0	0	0	0	0
4	Malta	0	0	0	0	0	0	0	0

Source: UEFA
Rules for classification: Tiebreakers
(H) Hosts
March 2021

England	Cancelled	Malta
	Report

March 2021

Wales	Cancelled	Slovenia
	Report

March 2021

England	Cancelled	Wales
	Report

March 2021

Slovenia	Cancelled	Malta
	Report

March 2021

Slovenia	Cancelled	England
	Report

March 2021

Malta	Cancelled	Wales
	Report

==== Group 11 ====
Originally scheduled to be played between 7–13 October 2020.

Pos	Team	Pld	W	D	L	GF	GA	GD	Pts
1	Netherlands (H)	0	0	0	0	0	0	0	0
2	Serbia	0	0	0	0	0	0	0	0
3	Armenia	0	0	0	0	0	0	0	0
4	San Marino	0	0	0	0	0	0	0	0

Source: UEFA
Rules for classification: Tiebreakers
(H) Hosts
March 2021

Netherlands	Cancelled	San Marino
	Report

March 2021

Armenia	Cancelled	Serbia
	Report

March 2021

Netherlands	Cancelled	Armenia
	Report

March 2021

Serbia	Cancelled	San Marino
	Report

March 2021

Serbia	Cancelled	Netherlands
	Report

March 2021

San Marino	Cancelled	Armenia
	Report

==== Group 12 ====
Originally scheduled to be played between 10–16 November 2020.

Pos	Team	Pld	W	D	L	GF	GA	GD	Pts
1	Turkey	0	0	0	0	0	0	0	0
2	Bulgaria (H)	0	0	0	0	0	0	0	0
3	Russia	0	0	0	0	0	0	0	0
4	Lithuania	0	0	0	0	0	0	0	0

Source: UEFA
Rules for classification: Tiebreakers
(H) Hosts
March 2021

Turkey	Cancelled	Lithuania
	Report

March 2021

Russia	Cancelled	Bulgaria
	Report

March 2021

Turkey	Cancelled	Russia
	Report

March 2021

Bulgaria	Cancelled	Lithuania
	Report

March 2021

Bulgaria	Cancelled	Turkey
	Report

March 2021

Lithuania	Cancelled	Russia
	Report

==== Group 13 ====
Originally scheduled to be played between 11–17 November 2020.

Pos	Team	Pld	W	D	L	GF	GA	GD	Pts
1	Spain	0	0	0	0	0	0	0	0
2	Belgium (H)	0	0	0	0	0	0	0	0
3	Finland	0	0	0	0	0	0	0	0
4	Faroe Islands	0	0	0	0	0	0	0	0

Source: UEFA
Rules for classification: Tiebreakers
(H) Hosts
March 2021

Spain	Cancelled	Faroe Islands
	Report

March 2021

Finland	Cancelled	Belgium
	Report

March 2021

Spain	Cancelled	Finland
	Report

March 2021

Belgium	Cancelled	Faroe Islands
	Report

March 2021

Belgium	Cancelled	Spain
	Report

March 2021

Faroe Islands	Cancelled	Finland
	Report

== Elite round ==
The draw for the elite round would originally have been held on 9 December 2020 at the UEFA headquarters in Nyon, Switzerland, and the matches were originally scheduled to be played in spring 2021. However, due to the COVID-19 pandemic in Europe, UEFA announced on 13 August 2020 that after consultation with the 55 member associations, the elite round would be abolished and replaced by play-offs.

== Play-offs ==
The fourteen teams were planned to be drawn into seven ties. The seven winners would have qualified for the final tournament. The play-offs were scheduled to be played in May 2021, before the tournament was ultimately cancelled.
