= Anatoly Bulgakov =

Anatoly Bulgakov may refer to:

- Anatoly Bulgakov (footballer, born 1944), Russian football coach and former player
- Anatoly Bulgakov (footballer, born 1979), Russian football player
