= Shkumbin Arsllani =

Albanian footballer

Personal information
- Date of birth: 27 February 1980 (age 46)
- Place of birth: Kicevo, SFR Yugoslavia
- Height: 1.87 m (6 ft 1 1/2 in)
- Position: Defender

Senior career*
Years	Team	Apps	(Gls)
2001–2003	Napredok	42	(1)
2004–2005	Rabotnički	4	(0)
2005	Renova	14	(0)
2006–2007	Vëllazërimi 77	33	(3)
2007–2008	Napredok	25	(1)
2009	Rabotnički	3	(0)
2009	JJK	7	(0)
2010–2011	Vëllazërimi 77		

International career
2003	Macedonia	2	(0)

Managerial career
- 2019–: Macedonia U18
- 2020–: Macedonia U19
- * Club domestic league appearances and goals as of 12 October 2009

Shkumbin Arsllani (Macedonian: Шкумбин Арслани, Škumbin Arslani; born 27 February 1980) is an Albanian retired football player from Macedonia, who has played for Finnish side JJK.

== International career ==
He made his debut for Macedonia in a February 2003 friendly match against Croatia and has earned a total of 2 caps, scoring no goals. His second and final international was a friendly against Poland in the same month.
