= Eliot Bujupi =

Kosovan footballer (born 2006)

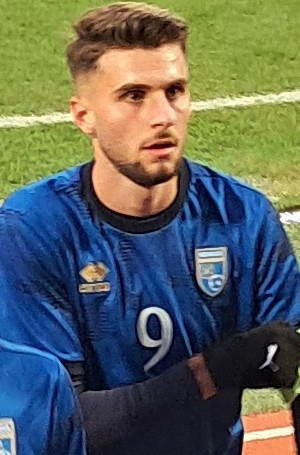
- Bujupi with Kosovo U19 in 2024

Personal information
- Date of birth: 3 July 2006 (age 20)
- Place of birth: Böblingen, Germany
- Height: 1.87 m (6 ft 2 in)
- Position: Striker

Team information
- Current team: VfB Stuttgart II
- Number: 38

Youth career
- –2016: VfL Sindelfingen
- 2016–2017: Stuttgarter Kickers
- 2017–2025: VfB Stuttgart

Senior career*
| Years | Team | Apps | (Gls) |
| 2024– | VfB Stuttgart II | 11 | (2) |
| 2025–2026 | → Westerlo (loan) | 5 | (0) |

International career^{‡}
| 2021–2022 | Germany U16 | 3 | (0) |
| 2022–2023 | Germany U17 | 7 | (1) |
| 2023–2024 | Kosovo U19 | 8 | (5) |
| 2025– | Kosovo U21 | 2 | (0) |
| 2024– | Kosovo | 1 | (0) |
- * Club domestic league appearances and goals as of 23 May 2026 ‡ National team caps and goals as of 9 September 2025

Eliot Bujupi (born 3 July 2006) is a professional footballer who plays as a striker for 3. Liga club VfB Stuttgart II. He was born in Germany and represented them at youth international level, before switching in 2023 to represent the Kosovo national team.

== Club career ==
=== Early career and VfB Stuttgart ===
Bujupi initially played for VfL Sindelfingen in his youth and then for Stuttgarter Kickers for a year in the 2016–17 season. He moved to VfB Stuttgart in 2017 with which in the 2021–22 season he became the U17 runner-up with the team. On 10 July 2024, Bujupi extended his contract long-term.

On 23 November 2024, he was named as a VfB Stuttgart II substitute for the first time in a 3. Liga match against SC Verl. His debut with VfB Stuttgart II came seven days later in a 2–0 home win against Waldhof Mannheim after coming on as a substitute in the 77th minute in place of Thomas Kastanaras. Seven days after debut, Bujupi scored his first goal for VfB Stuttgart II in his second appearance for the club in a 2–1 away defeat over Alemannia Aachen in 3. Liga.

==== Loan to Westerlo ====
On 8 September 2025, Bujupi joined Westerlo of the Belgian Pro League until the end of the 2025-26 season.

== International career ==
Born and raised in Germany, Bujupi is of Albanian origin from the village of Arllat in Drenas, Kosovo. From 2021 to 2023, Bujupi represented Germany at youth international level, being part of the U16 and U17 teams and he with these teams played ten matches and scored one goal.

On 24 June 2023, the Football Federation of Kosovo announced that Bujupi had decided to play for the Kosovo national team. On 1 September 2023, he received a call-up from Kosovo U19 for a four-day training camp in Nuremberg. His debut with Kosovo U19 came on 15 November in the UEFA Euro 2024 qualifying against Slovakia after being named in the starting line-up and scored his side's only goal during a 1–1 away win.

On 30 August 2024, Bujupi received a call-up from Kosovo for the 2024–25 UEFA Nations League matches against Romania and Cyprus. His debut with Kosovo came ten days later in the 2024–25 UEFA Nations League match against Cyprus after coming on as a substitute in the 87th minute in place of Lindon Emërllahu.
