= Elmedin Rama =

Footballer (born 2005)

Personal information
- Date of birth: 25 March 2005 (age 21)
- Place of birth: Mitrovica, Kosovo under UN administration
- Height: 1.90 m (6 ft 3 in)
- Position: Centre-forward

Team information
- Current team: Arka Gdynia
- Number: 98

Youth career
- –2023: Trepça

Senior career*
Years	Team	Apps	(Gls)
2023	Trepça	14	(3)
2023–2026	Slavia Prague B	29	(9)
2025	→ Pardubice (loan)	3	(0)
2025–2026	→ Sellier & Bellot Vlašim (loan)	22	(7)
2026–	Arka Gdynia	12	(1)

International career^{‡}
2022–2024	Kosovo U19	8	(1)
2024–	Albania U21	5	(1)
- * Club domestic league appearances and goals as of 23:35, 8 November 2026 (UTC) ‡ National team caps and goals as of 11:39, 11 July 2026 (UTC)

Elmedin Rama (born 25 March 2005) is a professional footballer who plays as a centre-forward for I liga club Arka Gdynia. A former youth international for Kosovo, he played for the under-19 team before switching to play for the Albania under-21s.

== Career ==
=== Trepça ===
Rama is a product of the Trepça academy. He debuted for the senior team in 2023. His first goal came on 12 March 2023 against Vëllaznimi.

=== Pardubice ===
On 19 January 2025, he was loaned to Pardubice of the Czech First League.

=== Arka Gdynia ===
On 10 July 2026, Rama signed a one-year contract with I liga club Arka Gdynia with an option to extend.

== Honours ==
Slavia Prague B

- Bohemian Football League: 2023–24
