= Alessandro Ovalle =

Dominican footballer (born 2005)

Personal information
- Full name: Alessandro Ovalle Santos
- Date of birth: 19 December 2005 (age 20)
- Place of birth: Varese, Italy
- Height: 1.90 m (6 ft 3 in)
- Position: Winger

Team information
- Current team: Team Altamura
- Number: 3

Youth career
- Torino Club Gallarate

Senior career*
Years	Team	Apps	(Gls)
2022–2023	Varese	1	(0)
2023–2025	Sampdoria	0	(0)
2025	Renate	0	(0)
2025–2026	Sant'Angelo	21	(2)
2026–	Altamura	2	(0)

International career^{‡}
2026–	Dominican Republic	1	(0)
- * Club domestic league appearances and goals as of 6 September 2026 ‡ National team caps and goals as of 20:05, 21 April 2026 (UTC)

Alessandro Ovalle Santos (born 19 December 2005) is a professional footballer who plays as a winger for Serie C Group C club Team Altamura. Born in Italy, he plays for the Dominican Republic national team.

== Club career ==
A youth product of Torino Club Gallarate, Ovalle debuted with his hometown club Varese in 2022 in Serie D. On 23 August 2023, he moved to the Primavera team of Sampdoria. On 1 July 2024, he extended his contract with Sampdoria for another season. On 28 August 2025, he moved to Serie C club Renate, on a 1+1 year contract. Unable to get playing time, he moved to Serie D club Sant'Angelo on 24 October 2025.

== International career ==
Born in Italy, Ovalle is of Dominican descent, and holds dual Dominican and Italian citizenship. He was called up to the Dominican Republic national team for a set of 2025–26 CONCACAF Series matches in March 2026. He debuted in a friendly tie with Cuba on 29 March 2026.
