= North Macedonia national under-19 football team =

North Macedonia Under-19
- Nickname: The Red Lions (Црвени лавови)
- Association: Football Federation of North Macedonia
- Confederation: UEFA (Europe)
- Head coach: (North Macedonia) Shkumbin Arsllani
- FIFA code: MKD
First colours	Second colours

The North Macedonia national under-19 football team is the national under-19 football team of the Republic of North Macedonia and is controlled by the Football Federation of North Macedonia. The current manager is Shkumbin Arsllani. The current tournament is the 2020 UEFA European Under-19 Championship, in which only players born on 1 January 2001 or later are eligible to play.

== 2018 UEFA European Under-19 Football Championship qualification ==
=== Group 5 (qualifying round) ===
Pos	Team	Pld	W	D	L	GF	GA	GD	Pts	Qualification
1	Macedonia (H)	3	3	0	0	10	2	+8	9	Elite round
2	Belgium	3	2	0	1	9	5	+4	6	Elite round
3	Switzerland	3	1	0	2	9	8	+1	3	
4	Liechtenstein	3	0	0	3	1	14	−13	0	

Source: UEFA
Rules for classification: Qualification tiebreakers
(H) Hosts
8 November 2017
13:00

Macedonia	2–1	Switzerland
Trajanovski 56'; Atanasov 61' (pen.)	Report	Ugrinic 33'

Training Centre Petar Miloševski (small stadium), Skopje
Referee: Roi Reinshreiber (Israel)

11 November 2017
13:00

Belgium	1–2	Macedonia
Foulon 10'	Report	Elmas 24'; Atanasov 87' (pen.)

Training Centre Petar Miloševski (small stadium), Skopje
Referee: Aleksandrs Anufrijevs (Latvia)

14 November 2017
13:00

Liechtenstein	0–6	Macedonia
	Report	Churlinov 3'; Kolevski 7'; Mitrovski 25', 54', 73'; Miovski 62'

Training Centre Petar Miloševski, Skopje
Referee: Aleksandrs Anufrijevs (Latvia)

== 2020 UEFA European Under-19 Championship qualification ==
=== Group 11 (qualifying round) ===
Pos	Team	Pld	W	D	L	GF	GA	GD	Pts	Qualification
1	England	3	3	0	0	13	1	+12	9	Elite round
2	North Macedonia (H)	3	1	1	1	3	5	−2	4	Elite round
3	Bosnia and Herzegovina	3	1	1	1	2	4	−2	4	
4	Luxembourg	3	0	0	3	0	8	−8	0	

Source: UEFA
Rules for classification: Tiebreakers
(H) Hosts
13 November 2019
13:00

England	4–0	Luxembourg
Harwood-Bellis 7'; Duncan 29', 32'; Amaechi 75'	Report

Gjorče Petrov Stadium, Skopje
Referee: Petri Viljanen (Finland)
13 November 2019
13:00

North Macedonia	0–0	Bosnia and Herzegovina
	Report

Petar Miloševski Training Centre, Skopje
Referee: Donatas Rumšas (Lithuania)

16 November 2019
13:00

England	5–0	North Macedonia
Doyle 41'; Gordon 54'; Garner 72', 79'; Saka 86'	Report

Petar Miloševski Training Centre, Skopje
Referee: Giorgi Kruashvili (Georgia)
16 November 2019
13:00

Bosnia and Herzegovina	1–0	Luxembourg
Bajrović 90+3'	Report

Gjorče Petrov Stadium, Skopje
Referee: Petri Viljanen (Finland)

19 November 2019
13:00

Bosnia and Herzegovina	1–4	England
Đokanović 48'	Report	Anjorin 24'; Laird 38'; Harwood-Bellis 69'; Gordon 70'

Gjorče Petrov Stadium, Skopje
Referee: Donatas Rumšas (Lithuania)
19 November 2019
13:00

Luxembourg	0–3	North Macedonia
	Report	Toshevski 44'; Vosha 45+1'; Murati 80'

Petar Miloševski Training Centre, Skopje
Referee: Giorgi Kruashvili (Georgia)

== 2022 UEFA European Under-19 Championship qualification ==
=== Group 7 ===
Pos	Team	Pld	W	D	L	GF	GA	GD	Pts	Qualification
1	France	3	3	0	0	8	1	+7	9	Elite round
2	Serbia	3	1	1	1	5	5	0	4	Elite round
3	Albania (H)	3	1	1	1	5	7	−2	4	
4	North Macedonia	3	0	0	3	2	7	−5	0	

Source: UEFA
Rules for classification: Tiebreakers
(H) Hosts
10 November 2021
12:00

North Macedonia	1–2	Serbia
Feta 78'	Report	Ajdar 56' (pen.), 65'

Elbasan Arena, Elbasan
Referee: David Fuxman (Israel)
10 November 2021
14:00

France	4–0	Albania
Virginius 28'; Abline 35', 40'; Tchaouna 64' (pen.)	Report

Arena Egnatia, Rrogozhinë
Referee: Vladimir Moskalyov (Russia)

13 November 2021
12:00

France	2–0	North Macedonia
Abline 14'; Virginius 25'	Report

Arena Egnatia, Rrogozhinë
Referee: Vladimir Moskalyov (Russia)
13 November 2021
14:00

Serbia	2–2	Albania
Mituljikić 42'; Lazetić 77'	Report	Nerguti 84'; Shpendi 88'

Elbasan Arena, Elbasan
Referee: Pavel Orel (Czech Republic)

16 November 2021
14:00

Albania	3–1	North Macedonia
Mata 19' (pen.); Pjeshka 48'; Bibo 50'	Report	Talakov 45+1'

Elbasan Arena, Elbasan
Referee: David Fuxman (Israel)
16 November 2021
14:00

Serbia	1–2	France
Ajdar 32'	Report	Tchaouna 3'; Abline 90+5'

Arena Egnatia, Rrogozhinë
Referee: Pavel Orel (Czech Republic)

== 2024 UEFA European Under-19 Championship qualification ==
=== Qualifying Round ===
==== Group 5 ====
Pos	Team	Pld	W	D	L	GF	GA	GD	Pts	Qualification
1	Germany	3	2	1	0	12	4	+8	7	Elite round
2	North Macedonia	3	1	1	1	4	4	0	4 (Note: Ranked on head-to-head points: North Macedonia: 3, Poland: 0)	Elite round
3	Poland (H)	3	1	1	1	6	5	+1	4	
4	Kazakhstan	3	0	1	2	1	10	−9	1	

Source: UEFA
Rules for classification: Tiebreakers
(H) Hosts
Notes:
11 October 2023
15:00

Germany	6–0	Kazakhstan
Lubach 25'; Pejčinović 30', 69'; Kömür 45', 60'; Bornschein 77'	Report

Stadion Miejski w Inowrocławiu, Inowrocław
Attendance: 200
Referee: Helgi Mikael Jónasson (Iceland)
11 October 2023
16:00

North Macedonia	2–0	Poland
Velichkovski 12'; Elmas 70'	Report

Stadium im. G. Duneckiego, Toruń
Attendance: 876
Referee: Tomas Klima (Czech Republic)

14 October 2023
13:15

Poland	3–0	Kazakhstan
Dziuba 24'; Śmiglewski 45+1', 59'	Report

Stadion Miejski w Inowrocławiu, Inowrocław
Attendance: 679
Referee: Helgi Mikael Jónasson (Iceland)
14 October 2023
15:30

Germany	3–1	North Macedonia
Pejčinović 57'; Bischof 67', 75'	Report	Gjorgievski 63'

Bydgoszcz Stadium, Bydgoszcz
Attendance: 221
Referee: Sander Van Der Eijk (Netherlands)

17 October 2023
15:30

Poland	3–3	Germany
Nsangou 14' (pen.); Drachal 24', 78'	Report	Krattenmacher 22'; Pejčinović 59', 83'

Bydgoszcz Stadium, Bydgoszcz
Attendance: 1,349
Referee: Sander Van Der Eijk (Netherlands)
17 October 2023
15:30

Kazakhstan	1–1	North Macedonia
Mukhametkhanov 25'	Report	Zendelovski 81'

Stadium im. G. Duneckiego, Toruń
Attendance: 107
Referee: Tomas Klima (Czech Republic)

=== Group 7 ===
Pos	Team	Pld	W	D	L	GF	GA	GD	Pts	Promotion
1	Ukraine	3	3	0	0	8	0	+8	9	Qualified for the final tournament
2	Switzerland	3	2	0	1	3	3	0	6	
3	Latvia	3	0	1	2	1	5	−4	1 (Note: Ranked on disciplinary points: Latvia: –7, North Macedonia: –10)	
4	North Macedonia (H)	3	0	1	2	1	5	−4	1	

Source: UEFA
Rules for classification: Qualification tiebreakers
(H) Hosts
Notes:
20 March 2024
14:00

Switzerland	1–0	Latvia
Lüthi 90'	Report

Gjorče Petrov Stadium, Skopje
Attendance: 65
Referee: Granit Maqedonci (Sweden)
20 March 2024
14:00

North Macedonia	0–2	Ukraine
	Report	Krevsun 45+1'; Ponomarenko 48'

Petar Miloševski Training Centre, Skopje
Attendance: 315
Referee: Marek Radina (Czech Republic)

23 March 2024
14:00

Switzerland	2–0	North Macedonia
Ligue 12'; Beney 80'	Report

Petar Miloševski Training Centre, Skopje
Attendance: 300
Referee: Ion Orlic (Moldova)
23 March 2024
14:00

Ukraine	3–0	Latvia
Ponomarenko 34', 60' (pen.); Tutierov 89'	Report

Gjorče Petrov Stadium, Skopje
Attendance: 115
Referee: Marek Radina (Czech Republic)

26 March 2024
14:00

Ukraine	3–0	Switzerland
Synchuk 63'; Ponomarenko 68', 78'	Report

Gjorče Petrov Stadium, Skopje
Attendance: 85
Referee: Granit Maqedonci (Sweden)
26 March 2024
14:00

Latvia	1–1	North Macedonia
Mežsargs 59'	Report	Danev 76'

Petar Miloševski Training Centre, Skopje
Attendance: 100
Referee: Ion Orlic (Moldova)

== 2025 UEFA European Under-19 Championship qualification ==
=== Qualifying Round ===
==== Group 12 ====
Pos	Team	Pld	W	D	L	GF	GA	GD	Pts	Qualification
1	Slovakia	3	2	0	1	5	3	+2	6	Elite round
2	Luxembourg (H)	3	1	1	1	5	5	0	4	Elite round
3	Latvia	3	1	1	1	5	4	+1	4	Elite round
4	North Macedonia	3	0	2	1	2	5	−3	2	

Source: UEFA
Rules for classification: Tiebreakers
(H) Hosts
9 October 2024
18:00

North Macedonia	1–1	Latvia
Gashtarov 76' (pen.)	Report	Mickēvičs 60'

Stade Municipal de la Ville de Differdange, Differdange
Attendance: 25
Referee: Kristoffer Hagenes (Norway)

12 October 2024
18:00

Slovakia	3–0	North Macedonia
Dikoš 34' (pen.); Sinanov 38' (o.g.); Petruška 67'	Report

Stade Jos Nosbaum, Dudelange
Attendance: 50
Referee: Gustavo Correia (Portugal)

15 October 2024
18:00

Luxembourg	1–1	North Macedonia
Domingos 45+3'	Report	Danev 8'

Stade Jos Nosbaum, Dudelange
Referee: Gustavo Correia (Portugal)

== 2026 UEFA European Under-19 Championship qualification ==
=== Qualifying Round ===
==== Group 11 ====
Pos	Team	Pld	W	D	L	GF	GA	GD	Pts	Qualification
1	Portugal (H)	3	1	2	0	6	3	+3	5	Elite round
2	Belgium	3	1	2	0	3	2	+1	5	Elite round
3	North Macedonia	3	1	0	2	3	5	−2	3	
4	Estonia	3	0	2	1	2	4	−2	2	

Source: UEFA
Rules for classification: Tiebreakers
(H) Hosts
12 November 2025
15:00

North Macedonia	0–1	Belgium
	Report	Musuayi 72'

Estádio Municipal de Lousada, Lousada
Attendance: 52
Referee: Snir Levy (Israel)

15 November 2025
18:00

Portugal	4–1	North Macedonia
Patrão 6'; Silva 26'; Soares 38'; Trovisco 66'	Report	Sabotikj 71'

Estádio Municipal das Laranjeiras, Paredes
Attendance: 414
Referee: Jamie Robinson (Northern Ireland)

18 November 2025
18:00

Estonia	0–2	North Macedonia
	Report	Sabotikj 20'; Latifi 65'

Complexo Desportivo Monte Azevido, Rebordosa
Attendance: 35
Referee: Jamie Robinson (Northern Ireland)

== 2027 UEFA European Under-19 Championship qualification ==
=== Qualifying Round ===
==== Group B5 ====
Pos	Team	Pld	W	D	L	GF	GA	GD	Pts	Promotion or transfer
1	Netherlands (H)	3	3	0	0	8	0	+8	9	Promotion to Round 2 League A
2	Moldova	3	1	1	1	3	2	+1	4	Transfer to Round 2 League B
3	North Macedonia	3	0	2	1	1	5	−4	2	Transfer to Round 2 League B
4	Faroe Islands	3	0	1	2	0	5	−5	1	Transfer to Round 2 League B

Source: UEFA
Rules for classification: Tiebreakers
(H) Hosts
25 March 2026
17:00

North Macedonia	0–0	Faroe Islands
	Report

Sportpark De Kranenhof, Escharen
Referee: Dmytro Kubriak (Ukraine)
25 March 2026
18:00

Netherlands	1–0	Moldova
Reulen 26' (pen.)	Report

Sportpark Zuid, Groesbeek
Referee: Mateo Erceg (Croatia)

28 March 2026
12:00

Faroe Islands	0–2	Moldova
	Report	Roșca 45'; Cornescu 90+1'

Sportpark Zuid, Groesbeek
Referee: Daniyar Sakhi (Kazakhstan)
28 March 2026
16:00

Netherlands	4–0	North Macedonia
Reulen 8', 53', 87'; Beerens 13'	Report

Sportpark De Kranenhof, Escharen
Referee: Dmytro Kubriak (Ukraine)

31 March 2026
18:00

Moldova	1–1	North Macedonia
Roșca 21'	Report	Tanchev 54'

Sportpark De Kranenhof, Escharen
Referee: Mateo Erceg (Croatia)
31 March 2026
18:00

Faroe Islands	0–3	Netherlands
	Report	Reulen 6'; Beerens 53'; Onunta 86' (pen.)

Sportpark Zuid, Groesbeek
Referee: Daniyar Sakhi (Kazakhstan)

==== Group B5 Round 2 ====
Pos	Team	Pld	W	D	L	GF	GA	GD	Pts	Promotion or transfer
1	Switzerland	0	0	0	0	0	0	0	0	Promotion to Round 3 League A
2	Northern Ireland	0	0	0	0	0	0	0	0	Transfer to Round 3 League B
3	North Macedonia (H)	0	0	0	0	0	0	0	0	Transfer to Round 3 League B
4	Malta	0	0	0	0	0	0	0	0	Transfer to Round 3 League B

First match(es) will be played: Autumn 2026. Source: UEFA
Rules for classification: Tiebreakers
(H) Hosts

== Players ==
=== Current squad ===
The following players were called up for friendly matches against Slovenia on 26 and 28 May 2026.

No.	Pos.	Player	Date of birth (age)	Club
1	GK	Aleksandar Trajkov	25 May 2008 (age 18)	(Football Federation of Macedonia) AP Brera
12	GK	Antonij Trajkovski	30 January 2008 (age 18)	(Football Federation of Macedonia) Vardar
4	DF	Mateo Kesikj	4 February 2008 (age 18)	(Football Association of Serbia) Jednistvo Ub
5	DF	Andrej Dimovski	22 September 2008 (age 18)	(Football Federation of Macedonia) AP Brera
14	DF	Viktor Manchovski		(Football Federation of Macedonia) AP Brera
15	DF	Stefan Stamatoski	9 January 2008 (age 18)	(Football Federation of Macedonia) Vardar
20	DF	Luka Varoshanoski	27 September 2008 (age 18)	(Football Federation of Macedonia) Kozhuf
3	DF	Stefan Sekirski	2 February 2008 (age 18)	(Football Federation of Macedonia) Novaci
16	DF	Filip Cvetkovski	4 August 2009 (age 17)	(Football Federation of Macedonia) Vardar
2	DF	Alban Rochi	31 January 2008 (age 18)	(Football Federation of Macedonia) Struga
23	DF	Stefan Jordanoski	3 January 2009 (age 17)	(Football Federation of Macedonia) AP Brera
8	MF	Lorent Zhaku	29 January 2008 (age 18)	(Football Federation of Macedonia) Rabotnički
6	MF	Marko Kish	9 May 2007 (age 19)	(Croatian Football Federation) Sesvete
21	MF	Valjmir Hamiti		(Football Federation of Macedonia) Rabotnički
10	MF	Ivan Tanchev	3 December 2008 (age 17)	(Football Federation of Macedonia) AP Brera
17	FW	Martin Djangarovski	11 June 2009 (age 17)	(Football Federation of Macedonia) Makedonija G.P.
7	FW	Flori Ilazi	13 November 2008 (age 17)	(Football Federation of Macedonia) Shkëndija/Iskra
11	FW	Stefan Brankovski	6 August 2008 (age 18)	(Football Association of Slovenia) Maribor
18	FW	Riste Milev		(Football Federation of Macedonia) AP Brera
13	FW	Ivo Markovski	19 July 2008 (age 18)	(Football Federation of Macedonia) Vardar
19	FW	Florent Osmani	23 September 2008 (age 18)	(Football Federation of Macedonia) Arsimi/Student
9	FW	Matej Sejmenov	5 January 2008 (age 18)	(Football Federation of Macedonia) AP Brera

=== Recent call-ups ===
The following players were called up within the last twelve months and remain eligible for selection.

Pos.	Player	Date of birth (age)	Caps	Goals	Club	Latest call-up

== See also ==
- North Macedonia national football team
- North Macedonia national under-21 football team
- North Macedonia national under-17 football team
- European Under-19 Football Championship
