= Bodin Tomašević =

Montenegrin footballer (born 2006)

Personal information
- Date of birth: 12 May 2006 (age 20)
- Place of birth: Podgorica, Montenegro
- Height: 1.93 m (6 ft 4 in)
- Position: Defender

Team information
- Current team: Mantova (on loan from Bologna)
- Number: 5

Youth career
- Fk Stari Aerodrom: Budućnost
- 2025–2026: Bologna

Senior career*
Years	Team	Apps	(Gls)
2023–2025	Budućnost	12	(0)
2025–	Bologna	0	(0)
2026–	→ Mantova (loan)	9	(1)

International career^{‡}
2021	Montenegro U15	2	(0)
2021–2022	Montenegro U16	6	(0)
2022–2023	Montenegro U17	12	(1)
2022	Montenegro U18	3	(0)
2023–2025	Montenegro U19	24	(1)
2026–	Montenegro	1	(0)
- * Club domestic league appearances and goals as of 20 September 2026 ‡ National team caps and goals as of 15 November 2026

Bodin Tomašević (Montenegrin: Бодин Томашевић; born 12 May 2006) is a Montenegrin professional footballer who plays as a defender for Serie B club Mantova, on loan from Bologna and the Montenegro national team.

== Early life ==
Tomašević was born on 12 May 2006. Born in Podgorica, Montenegro, he is the grandson of Slobodan. Growing up, he aspired to play as a forward.

== Club career ==
As a youth player, Tomašević joined the youth academy of Budućnost, where he played in the UEFA Youth League and was promoted to the club's senior team in 2023, where he made twelve league appearances and scored zero goals and helped the club win the league title.

Following his stint there, he joined the youth academy of Italian Serie A side Bologna in 2025 and was promoted to the club's senior team the same year. Ahead of the 2026–27 season, he was sent on loan to Italian outfit Mantova. On 16 August 2026, he debuted for the club during a 2–0 away win over Lazio in the Coppa Italia.

== International career ==
Tomašević is a Montenegro youth international and has represented the country internationally at under-15, under-16, under-17, under-18, and under-19 level. Altogether, he made two appearances and scored zero goals while playing for the Montenegro national under-15 football team and six appearances and scored zero goals while playing for the Montenegro national under-16 football team.

During the autumn of 2022 and the spring of 2023, he played for the Montenegro national under-17 football team for 2023 UEFA European Under-17 Championship. One year later, he played for the Montenegro national under-19 football team for 2024 UEFA European Under-19 Championship qualification.

=== International ===
As of match played 15 November 2026

Appearances and goals by national team and year
National team	Year	Apps	Goals
Montenegro	2026	1	0
Total		1	0

== Style of play ==
Tomašević plays as a defender and is right-footed. Italian news website MondoPrimavera wrote in 2026 that he "is a physically imposing defender: 191 centimeters tall, with a robust build and a strong presence in the air. He started out as a central defender, but can also play as a right back, a role he plays with defensive aptitude and strong tackling. He's a powerful player, very reliable in physical duels, and capable of making quick interventions. Despite his size, he moves with reasonable speed and displays a certain versatility".
