= Team Altamura =

Italian football club

- Full name: Team Altamura srl
- Nicknames: Leoni (Lions); Biancorossi (White and red)
- Founded: 2003; 23 years ago (as Real Altamura)
- Ground: Comunale Tonino D'Angelo, Altamura, Italy
- Capacity: 3,000
- Chairman: Filippo Direnzo
- Manager: Ledian Memushaj
- League: Serie C Group C
- 2025–26: Serie C Group C, 12th of 20
Home colours	Away colours

Team Altamura, sometimes referred to as just Altamura, is an Italian association football club located in Altamura, Apulia. Its colours are white and red.

== History ==
The club was founded in 2003 as Real Altamura. Originally a minor club in the city of Altamura, they slowly became the top local team following the decline of US Altamura, who formerly played in the Serie C as well. In 2015, the club was renamed to Team Altamura and won promotion to Serie D in 2017.

On 21 April 2024, Team Altamura won promotion to Serie C after mathematically winning the Group H title with two games to go.

== Current squad ==
As of 1 September 2026

Note: Flags indicate national team as defined under FIFA eligibility rules; some limited exceptions apply. Players may hold more than one non-FIFA nationality.

No.	Pos.	Nation	Player
1	GK	ITA	Francesco Di Bartolo (on loan from Palermo)
2	DF	ITA	Lorenzo Gagliardi (on loan from Genoa)
3	MF	DOM	Alessandro Ovalle
4	MF	ITA	Nicola Dipinto
5	DF	ITA	Matteo Zazza
6	DF	GER	Fabiano Pacia
7	FW	ITA	Marco Rosafio
8	MF	ITA	Marco Crimi
9	FW	ITA	Giancarlo Malcore
10	FW	ITA	Alessio Curcio
11	FW	ITA	Giuseppe Simone
14	FW	SRB	Miloš Bočić
15	FW	ITA	Mattia Florio
16	DF	ITA	Michele Grande

No.	Pos.	Nation	Player
19	DF	ITA	Mattia Esposito
20	MF	LTU	Ernestas Gudelevičius
21	MF	ITA	Tobia Mogentale
27	FW	ITA	Roberto Dimola
28	DF	CRO	Roko Tudor
30	MF	ITA	Marco Nazzaro
31	DF	ITA	Roberto Pirrello
32	GK	ITA	Filippo Perucchini
37	DF	ITA	Matteo Falasca
70	MF	ITA	Lorenzo Peschetola
73	DF	ITA	Nicholas Fantoni
77	MF	CRO	Marin Ćalušić
97	GK	ITA	Fabrizio Alastra
