= Elvir Gashijan =

Kosovan professional footballer

Personal information
- Full name: Elvir Gashijan
- Date of birth: 5 August 2006 (age 20)
- Place of birth: Mitrovica, UN-administered Kosovo
- Height: 1.64 m (5 ft 5 in)
- Position: Winger

Team information
- Current team: Bodrum
- Number: 30

Youth career
- Rudar K. Mitrovica
- –2021: Trepça '89
- 2021–2022: 2 Korriku

Senior career*
Years	Team	Apps	(Gls)
2022–2023	2 Korriku	15	(0)
2023–2026	Llapi	87	(4)
2026–	Bodrum	2	(0)

International career^{‡}
2022	Kosovo U17	3	(1)
2023–2024	Kosovo U19	10	(3)
2024–	Kosovo U21	7	(0)
- * Club domestic league appearances and goals as of 13 October 2026 ‡ National team caps and goals as of 24 September 2026

Elvir Gashijan (also spelled Gashijani; born 5 August 2006) is a Kosovan professional footballer who plays as a winger for TFF 1. Lig club Bodrum.

== Club career ==
=== Early career ===
Gashijan began playing football in his hometown, occasionally competing in the parallel Serbian league system with the youth teams of Rudar in North Mitrovica. He later developed through the youth systems of Trepça '89 and 2 Korriku, within the Kosovan football league system.

In July 2022, at the age of 15, he signed his first professional contract with Kosovo First League club 2 Korriku and joined the club's first-team preparations. He had scored 15 goals and provided 10 assists in 30 appearances for the club's youth side during the preceding 2021–22 season.

=== Llapi ===
On 20 June 2023, Gashijan joined Kosovo Superleague club Llapi, signing a two-year contract with an option to extend for a further year. His debut with Llapi came on 13 August against Drita after coming on as a substitute at 66th minute in place of Trimror Selimi. On 30 September 2023, Gashijan scored his first goal for Llapi in his third appearance for the club in a 1–2 away defeat over Ballkani in Kosovo Superleague.

=== Bodrum ===
On 5 September 2026, Gashijan signed a four-year contract with TFF 1. Lig club Bodrum. His debut with Bodrum came fifteen days later against Pendikspor after coming on as a substitute at 84th minute in place of Ege Bilsel.

== International career ==
Since 2022, Gashijan is part of Kosovo at youth international level, respectively representing the U17, U19 and U21 teams and he with these teams played twenty matches and scored four goals. On 9 January 2025, Gashijan received a call-up from Kosovo national senior team for a three-day training camp in Pristina.

== Personal life ==
Gashijan was born in Mitrovica, Kosovo to a Romani family. His brother, Shaban, is an active footballer and futsal player. He plays football for Trepča in the parallel Serbian league system in North Mitrovica, and also plays futsal for Trepça in the Kosovan league system in South Mitrovica.

== Honours ==
Individual

- Kosovo Superleague "Star of the Week" Award: 2024–25 (Round 30)
