= Danila Bulgakov =

Finnish footballer (born 2005)

Personal information
- Full name: Danila Anatolyevich Bulgakov
- Date of birth: 20 January 2005 (age 21)
- Place of birth: Tornio, Finland
- Height: 1.79 m (5 ft 10 in)
- Position: Winger

Team information
- Current team: SJK
- Number: 21

Youth career
- –2020: TP-47
- 2021–2022: OLS

Senior career*
Years	Team	Apps	(Gls)
2020	TP-47	2	(0)
2023	OLS	18	(11)
2023	AC Oulu	5	(0)
2024–	Ilves	6	(0)
2024–2025	Ilves II	10	(4)
2025	→ Haka (loan)	18	(3)
2026–	SJK	7	(0)
2026	→ SJK Akatemia (loan)	8	(1)

International career^{‡}
2019	Finland U15	3	(0)
2019	Finland U17	2	(0)
2023	Finland U18	5	(0)
2023	Finland U19	6	(1)
2024–	Finland U21	2	(0)
Medal record
Finland U18
First place	Baltic Cup	2023
- * Club domestic league appearances and goals as of 1 November 2026 ‡ National team caps and goals as of 9 June 2024

Danila Anatolyevich Bulgakov (Russian: Данила Анатольевич Булгаков; born 20 January 2005) is a Finnish professional football player for Veikkausliiga club SJK Seinäjoki.

== Club career ==
=== TP-47 ===
Bulgakov started to play football in Finland with a TP-47 youth team in his hometown Tornio. He made his senior debut in 2020 with the club's first team in fourth-tier Kolmonen, at the age of 15.

=== OLS ===
In 2021, Bulgakov moved to Oulu and joined the AC Oulu organisation. Bulgakov made his debut on 22 April 2023 with the club's reserve team OLS, in the third-tier Kakkonen. During the season, he played 18 games and scored 11 times for OLS in the division.

=== AC Oulu ===
Bulgakov made his Veikkausliiga debut with AC Oulu on 27 August 2023, as a late substitute to Rasmus Karjalainen, in a 3–1 home loss against HJK. He played in five league games in total in the end of the 2023 season.

=== Ilves ===
On 21 November 2023, a fellow Veikkausliiga side Ilves announced the signing of Bulgakov on a two-year deal, with an option for an additional year.

==== Haka (loan) ====
On 21 February 2025, he was loaned out to Haka for the 2025 season.

=== SJK ===
On 12 December 2025, SJK Seinäjoki announced the signing of Bulgakov on a two-year deal, with an option for an additional year.

== International career ==
Bulgakov has represented Finland at various youth national team levels.

Bulgakov was part of the Finland U18 squad winning the friendly tournament Baltic Cup in June 2023.

In October 2023, Bulgakov was part of the Finland U19 squad in the 2024 UEFA European Under-19 Championship qualification tournament, scoring one goal in three games against Romania, Czech Republic and San Marino.

== Personal life ==
His father Anatoly Bulgakov is a Russian former footballer who played in Finland.

== Career statistics ==
As of 21 July 2026

Appearances and goals by club, season and competition
Club	Season	League			Cup (Note: Includes Suomen Cup)		League cup (Note: Includes Finnish League Cup)		Europe		Total	
Club	Season	Division	Apps	Goals	Apps	Goals	Apps	Goals	Apps	Goals	Apps	Goals
TP-47	2020	Kolmonen	2	0	0	0	—		—		2	0
OLS	2023	Kakkonen	18	11	1	0	—		—		19	11
AC Oulu	2023	Veikkausliiga	5	0	—		—		—		5	0
Ilves	2024	Veikkausliiga	6	0	0	0	2	0	0	0	8	0
Ilves II	2024	Kakkonen	10	4	—		—		—		10	4
Haka (loan)	2025	Veikkausliiga	18	3	2	0	4	1	–		24	4
SJK Akatemia	2026	Ykkösliiga	5	0	—		—		—		5	0
SJK	2026	Veikkausliiga	7	0	3	0	5	0	—		15	0
Career total			71	18	6	0	11	1	0	0	88	19

== Honours ==
OLS

- Kakkonen, Group C: 2023

Ilves

- Veikkausliiga runner-up: 2024

Finland U18

- Baltic Cup: 2023

=== Individual ===
- Finnish FA, Northern Finland: The Boy Player of the Year 2022
