= Akseli Puukko =

Finnish footballer (born 2006)

Personal information
- Date of birth: 24 August 2006 (age 20)
- Place of birth: Lahti, Finland
- Height: 1.80 m (5 ft 11 in)
- Position: Full-back

Team information
- Current team: KuPS
- Number: 29

Youth career
- Reipas Lahti
- –2022: Lahti
- 2024–2026: Bologna

Senior career*
Years	Team	Apps	(Gls)
2022–2024	Reipas Lahti	9	(0)
2022–2024	Lahti	31	(0)
2026–	KuPS	14	(0)

International career^{‡}
2021–2022	Finland U16	5	(0)
2022–2023	Finland U17	15	(0)
2023–	Finland U18	5	(0)
2023–	Finland U19	9	(1)
Medal record
Men's football
Representing Finland
U19 Baltic Cup
First place	2023 Finland
- * Club domestic league appearances and goals as of 12 November 2026 ‡ National team caps and goals as of 16 October 2024

Akseli Puukko (born 24 August 2006) is a Finnish professional footballer who plays as a right-back for KuPS, and the Finland U19 national team.

== Club career ==
=== FC Lahti ===
After playing in the youth sector of his hometown club FC Lahti organisation, Puukko signed his first professional contract with the club on 30 September 2022, on a three-year deal. Puukko made his Veikkausliiga debut at the age of 16, on 16 October 2022 at home against HIFK, after being named in the starting line-up. He played 77 minutes in a 6–1 victory.

On 16 November 2023, FC Lahti announced that Puukko had extended his contract with the club, signing a deal until the end of the 2026 season.

=== Bologna ===
On 30 August 2024, it was confirmed that Puukko would join the Italian Serie A club Bologna for an undisclosed fee. However, he was first assigned to the youth academy team, competing in Primavera. He also represented Bologna in the UEFA Youth League.

== International career ==
Puukko is a regular Finnish youth international, having represented Finland at under-16, under-17, under-18 and under-19 youth national team levels.

In September 2022, Puukko was named in the Finland U17 squad for the 2023 UEFA European Under-17 Championship qualification tournament against Greece, Italy and Kosovo, playing in all three games. Finland finished 2nd in the group and qualified to the elite round in March 2023.

Puukko was part of the Finland U18 squad winning the friendly tournament Baltic Cup in June 2023.

In October 2023, Puukko was part of the Finland U19 squad in the 2024 UEFA European Under-19 Championship qualification tournament, scoring one goal in three games against Romania, Czech Republic and San Marino.

== Career statistics ==
As of 19 August 2024

Appearances and goals by club, season and competition
Club	Season	League			Cup (Note: Includes Finnish Cup)		League cup (Note: Includes Finnish League Cup)		Europe		Total	
Club	Season	Division	Apps	Goals	Apps	Goals	Apps	Goals	Apps	Goals	Apps	Goals
Reipas Lahti	2022	Kakkonen	1	0	—		—		—		1	0
Reipas Lahti	2023	Kakkonen	7	0	—		—		—		7	0
Reipas Lahti	2024	Kakkonen	1	0	—		—		—		1	0
Reipas Lahti	Total		9	0	0	0	0	0	0	0	9	0
Lahti	2022	Veikkausliiga	1	0	0	0	0	0	—		1	0
Lahti	2023	Veikkausliiga	15	0	3	0	4	0	—		22	0
Lahti	2024	Veikkausliiga	15	0	3	0	6	0	—		24	0
Lahti	Total		31	0	6	0	10	0	0	0	47	0
Career total			40	0	6	0	10	0	0	0	56	0

== Honours ==
Finland U18

- Baltic Cup: 2023
