= Kristaps Grabovskis =

Latvian footballer (born 2005)

Personal information
- Date of birth: 14 June 2005 (age 21)
- Place of birth: Riga, Latvia
- Height: 1.67 m (5 ft 6 in)
- Positions: Midfielder; winger

Team information
- Current team: Dila Gori (on loan from B.93)
- Number: 11

Youth career
- –2021: Metta
- 2021–2023: RB Leipzig
- 2023–2024: Rapid Wien

Senior career*
Years	Team	Apps	(Gls)
2023–2024	Rapid Wien II	3	(0)
2024–2025	Rapid Wien	0	(0)
2024–2025	→ Metta (loan)	30	(4)
2025–	B.93	27	(2)
2026–	→ Dila Gori (loan)	7	(0)

International career^{‡}
2021–2022	Latvia U17	6	(0)
2023–2024	Latvia U19	14	(6)
2024–	Latvia U21	6	(0)
2025–	Latvia	5	(0)
- * Club domestic league appearances and goals as of 21:35, 29 September 2026 (UTC) ‡ National team caps and goals as of 18 November 2026

Kristaps Grabovskis (born 14 June 2005) is a Latvian professional footballer who plays as a midfielder or winger for Georgian Erovnuli Liga club Dila Gori, on loan from Danish 2nd Division club B.93.

== Early life ==
Grabovskis was born on 14 June 2005. Born in Riga, Latvia, he is the younger brother of Reinis and started playing football at the age of four.

== Club career ==
As a youth player, Grabovskis joined the youth academy of Latvian side Metta. Following his stint there, he joined the youth academy of German Bundesliga side RB Leipzig in 2021. Subsequently, he joined the youth academy of Austrian side Rapid in 2023 and was promoted to the club's reserve team the same year, where he made three league appearances and scored zero goals.

Two years later, he returned on loan to Latvian side Metta, where he made thirty league appearances and scored four goals. Ahead of the 2025–26 season, he signed for Danish side B.93 in the Danish 1st Division.

On 2 August 2026, following B.93's relegation to the Danish 2nd Division, Grabovskis was sent on a one-season loan to Georgian Erovnuli Liga club Dila Gori.

== International career ==
Grabovskis is a Latvia youth international. During October 2023 and March 2024, he played for the Latvia national under-19 football team for 2024 UEFA European Under-19 Championship qualification.
