= Manuel Mendonça =

Portuguese footballer (born 2005)

Personal information
- Full name: Manuel Ascenção Bebiano Mendonça
- Date of birth: 24 March 2005 (age 21)
- Place of birth: Faro, Portugal
- Height: 1.72 m (5 ft 8 in)
- Position: Attacking midfielder

Team information
- Current team: Moreirense
- Number: 7

Youth career
- 2010–2014: ADGG
- 2014–2017: Louletano
- 2017–2025: Sporting CP

Senior career*
Years	Team	Apps	(Gls)
2023–2026	Sporting CP B	80	(8)
2025	Sporting CP	0	(0)
2026–	Moreirense	3	(0)

International career^{‡}
2022	Portugal U17	4	(0)
2022–2023	Portugal U18	12	(1)
2023–2024	Portugal U19	11	(2)
2024–	Portugal U20	20	(1)
- * Club domestic league appearances and goals as of 9 September 2026 ‡ National team caps and goals as of 18 June 2026

Manuel Ascenção Bebiano Mendonça (born 24 March 2005) is a Portuguese footballer who plays as an attacking midfielder for Primeira Liga club Moreirense and the Portugal under-20 national team.

== Club career ==
Born in Faro on the Algarve, Mendonça began playing for Geração de Génios in his hometown before joining nearby Louletano, and in 2017 he joined Sporting CP's youth team. At the end of 2021 he signed a professional contract, having seven goals in 15 games for the under-17 team that he captained, and with whom he ended the season as national champion. Having been made captain of the under-19 team while also taking part with the under-23 team, he extended his contract in 2023.

In January 2025, as captain of Sporting CP B in the Liga 3 and training with the first team, Mendonça received offers from clubs in Spain and Germany. In July, having finished the season with 33 games, six goals and five assists as his team won promotion, he extended his contract to 2028.

On 1 November 2025, Mendonça scored his first Liga Portugal 2 goal in the 10th game of the season, an equaliser in a 3–2 home win over Feirense.

== International career ==
Mendonça was chosen for the Portugal under-17 team at the 2022 UEFA European Championship in Israel. On 29 May, after a 2–2 draw with France in the semi-finals, his miss lost the penalty shootout.

On 11 June 2023, Mendonça scored for the under-18 team in a 5–0 win over Norway in the Torneio Internacional Cidade de Lisboa in the Portuguese capital. With the under-19 team, he scored in a 4–1 home win over Serbia in 2024 UEFA European Under-19 Championship qualification, though his team did not make the final tournament in Northern Ireland.
