= Mike Kleijn =

Dutch footballer (born 2005)

Personal information
- Date of birth: 9 February 2005 (age 21)
- Place of birth: Breda, Netherlands
- Height: 1.75 m (5 ft 9 in)
- Positions: Left-back; midfielder

Team information
- Current team: Volendam (on loan from Sparta Rotterdam)

Youth career
- Baronie
- 2011–2024: Feyenoord

Senior career*
Years	Team	Apps	(Gls)
2024–	Sparta Rotterdam	19	(0)
2024–	Jong Sparta	15	(1)
2026–	→ Volendam (loan)	0	(0)

International career^{‡}
2020	Netherlands U15	5	(0)
2021–2022	Netherlands U17	16	(1)
2023	Netherlands U18	3	(0)
2024	Netherlands U19	3	(2)
Medal record
Men's football
Representing Netherlands
UEFA European Under-17 Championship
Runner-up	2022 Israel
- * Club domestic league appearances and goals as of 17 May 2026 ‡ National team caps and goals as of 26 March 2024

Mike Kleijn (born 9 February 2005) is a Dutch professional footballer who plays as a left-back or midfielder for Eerste Divisie club Volendam, on loan from Eredivisie club Sparta Rotterdam.

== Professional career ==
Kleijn began playing football with the youth side of Baronie, and moved to Feyenoord's youth academy at the age of 6 in 2011. He worked his way up their youth sides, eventually captaining the U18s, and signed his first professional contract with them on 2 November 2020. In September 2022, he was named by English newspaper The Guardian as one of the best players born in 2005 worldwide.

In his time with Feyenoord, Kleijn was included in the senior team's matchday squad only once, on 17 March 2022 in a Conference League game against Partizan, he remained on the bench in that game.

On 12 April 2024, Kleijn signed a four-year contract with Sparta Rotterdam, beginning in the 2024–25 season.

On 29 July 2026, Kleijn was loaned by Volendam for the 2026–27 season.

== International career ==
Kleijn is a youth international for the Netherlands, and captained the Netherlands U17s at the 2022 UEFA European Under-17 Championship.

== Career statistics ==
As of match played 8 March 2026

Appearances and goals by club, season and competition
Club	Season	League			National Cup		Continental		Other		Total	
Club	Season	Division	Apps	Goals	Apps	Goals	Apps	Goals	Apps	Goals	Apps	Goals
Sparta Rotterdam	2024–25	Eredivisie	8	0	0	0	—		0	0	8	0
Sparta Rotterdam	2025–26	Eredivisie	10	0	3	0	—		—		13	0
Sparta Rotterdam	Total		18	0	3	0	—		0	0	21	0
Jong Sparta	2024–25	Tweede Divisie	13	1	—		—		—		13	1
Jong Sparta	2025–26	Tweede Divisie	4	0	—		—		—		4	0
Career total			35	1	3	0	0	0	0	0	38	1
