= 2021 UEFA European Under-19 Championship =

Campionatul European de Fotbal sub 19 ani 2021

Tournament details
- Host country: Romania
- Dates: Cancelled (originally 30 June – 13 July)
- Teams: 8 (from 1 confederation)

The 2021 UEFA European Under-19 Championship (also known as UEFA Under-19 Euro 2021) was scheduled to be the 19th edition of the UEFA European Under-19 Championship (69th edition if the Under-18 and Junior eras are included), the annual international youth football championship organised by UEFA for the men's under-19 national teams of Europe. Romania were scheduled to host the tournament between 30 June and 13 July 2021. A total of eight teams were to play in the tournament, with players born on or after 1 January 2002 eligible to participate.

On 23 February 2021, UEFA announced the tournament was cancelled due to the COVID-19 pandemic in Europe.

== Host selection ==
The timeline of host selection was as follows:

- 11 January 2019: bidding procedure launched
- 28 February 2019: deadline to express interest
- 27 March 2019: Announcement by UEFA that declaration of interest were received from 17 member associations to host one of the UEFA national team youth final tournaments (UEFA European Under-19 Championship, UEFA Women's Under-19 Championship, UEFA European Under-17 Championship, UEFA Women's Under-17 Championship) in 2021 and 2022 (although it was not specified which association were interested in which tournament)
- 28 June 2019: Submission of bid dossiers
- 24 September 2019: Selection of successful host associations by the UEFA Executive Committee at its meeting in Ljubljana

For the UEFA European Under-19 Championship final tournament of 2021, Romania was selected as host.

== Qualification ==
A total of 54 UEFA nations entered the competition, and with the hosts Romania qualifying automatically, the original format would have seen the other 53 teams competing in the qualifying competition, which would have consisted of two rounds: Qualifying round, which would have taken place in autumn 2020, and Elite round, which would have also taken place in spring 2021, to determine the remaining seven spots in the final tournament. However, due to the COVID-19 pandemic in Europe, UEFA announced on 13 August 2020 that after consultation with the 55 member associations, the qualifying round was initially delayed to March 2021, and the elite round was abolished and replaced by play-offs, contested in May 2021 by the 13 qualifying round group winners and the top seed by coefficient ranking, Portugal (which originally would receive a bye to the elite round), to determine the teams qualifying for the final tournament.

=== Qualified teams ===
The following teams qualified for the final tournament.

Note: All appearance statistics include only U-19 era (since 2002).

Team	Method of qualification	Appearance	Last appearance	Previous best performance
Romania	Hosts	2nd	2011 (group stage)	Group stage (2011)
N/A	Play-off winners			
N/A	Play-off winners			
N/A	Play-off winners			
N/A	Play-off winners			
N/A	Play-off winners			
N/A	Play-off winners			
N/A	Play-off winners			

== Venues ==
All 4 tournament venues were to be located near the capital Bucharest.

Location	Stadium	Capacity
Ploiești	Stadionul Ilie Oană	15,073
Bucharest	Rapid Arena	14,047
Bucharest	Stadionul Arcul de Triumf	8,155
Voluntari	Stadionul Anghel Iordănescu	4,518
