= Yanis Senhadji =

Algerian footballer (born 2005)

Personal information
- Full name: Yanis Senhadji Chikhaoui
- Date of birth: 5 January 2005 (age 21)
- Place of birth: Sant Feliu de Llobregat, Spain
- Height: 1.84 m (6 ft 0 in)
- Position: Forward

Team information
- Current team: Real Jaén
- Number: 15

Youth career
- 2017–2020: Cornellà
- 2020–2021: Sant Andreu
- 2021–2022: Betis
- 2022–2023: Calavera
- 2023–2024: Betis

Senior career*
| Years | Team | Apps | (Gls) |
| 2023–2026 | Betis B | 37 | (7) |
| 2024–2025 | → Tenerife (loan) | 7 | (0) |
| 2025 | → Hércules (loan) | 1 | (0) |
| 2026– | Real Jaén | 0 | (0) |

International career^{‡}
| 2023–2024 | Spain U19 | 13 | (3) |
| 2026– | Algeria U23 | 1 | (1) |
Medal record
Men's football
Representing Spain
UEFA European Under-19 Championship
| Winner | 2024 Northern Ireland |
- * Club domestic league appearances and goals as of 10 June 2026 ‡ National team caps and goals as of November 10, 2026

Yanis Senhadji Chikhaoui (Arabic: يانيس الصنهاجي; born 5 January 2005) is a professional footballer who plays as a forward for Real Jaén. Born in Spain and a former Spanish youth international, he changed his international allegiance to Algeria.

== Early life ==
Senhadji is a native of Sant Feliu de Llobregat, Catalonia. He is of Algerian descent.

== Club career ==
Senhadji joined the youth sides of Real Betis in 2021, after representing UE Sant Andreu and UE Cornellà. On 1 October 2023, he made his senior debut with the reserves during a 1–1 Segunda Federación draw with Sevilla Atlético. On 11 November 2023, he scored his first goal for the club during a 5–2 win over CA Antoniano.

On 11 January 2024, Senhadji renewed his contract with the Verdiblancos until 2028. On 19 June, after helping the B's in their promotion to Primera Federación, he was loaned to Segunda División side CD Tenerife, for one year.

On 29 January 2025, Senhadji moved on a new loan to Hércules in Primera Federación.

== International career ==
Senhadji has represented Spain internationally at youth level. He is eligible to represent Algeria internationally through his parents.

On 3 September 2026, Senhadji's request to switch allegiance to Algeria was approved by FIFA.

== Style of play ==
Senhadji mainly operates as a striker. He is right-footed. He is known for his versatility.

== Honours ==
Spain U19

- UEFA European Under-19 Championship: 2024
