= Ernestas Gudelevičius =

Lithuanian footballer (born 2005)

Personal information
- Date of birth: 14 January 2005 (age 21)
- Place of birth: Naujoji Akmenė, Lithuania
- Position: Midfielder

Team information
- Current team: Team Altamura
- Number: 20

Youth career
- –2021: Be1 NFA
- 2021–2025: Fiorentina

Senior career*
| Years | Team | Apps | (Gls) |
| 2021 | Be1 NFA | 8 | (2) |
| 2025–2026 | Siracusa | 27 | (2) |
| 2026– | Team Altamura | 2 | (0) |

International career^{‡}
| 2021 | Lithuania U17 | 4 | (0) |
| 2023 | Lithuania U18 | 2 | (0) |
| 2023–2024 | Lithuania U19 | 11 | (4) |
| 2024– | Lithuania U21 | 11 | (0) |
- * Club domestic league appearances and goals as of 29 August 2026 ‡ National team caps and goals as of 9 June 2026

Ernestas Gudelevičius (born 14 January 2005) is a Lithuanian professional footballer who plays as a midfielder for Italian Serie C Group C club Team Altamura.

== Club career ==
Born in Naujoji Akmenė, Ernestas Gudelevičius joined the FK Be1 academy in 2020.

He made his professional debut for Be1 NFA on the 28 March 2021, coming on as a second-half substitute in a 1-0 II Lyga win against FA Šiauliai B.

He scored his first senior goal on 18 April 2021, opening the score against VJFM Fortūna.

On the summer 2021, he was transferred to ACF Fiorentina in Serie A, joining his compatriot Gvidas Gineitis in the Italian top flight.

In Italy, Gudelevičius became a regular with Firenze's under-19, as they won the Primavera Cup in 2024. He later extended his contract with the club until 2027.

On 30 August 2025, Gudelevičius signed a three-year contract with Siracusa in the third-tier Serie C.

== International career ==
Ernestas Gudelevičius is a youth international for Lithuania, first receiving a call with the under-17 in June 2021, before becoming a standout with the under-19, most notably scoring a brace has his team defeated France 2–0, despite the French side including the likes of Eli Junior Kroupi, Mathys Tel, Senny Mayulu and Saël Kumbedi.

In June 2024 he was called with the senior Lithuanian team for the first time by Edgaras Jankauskas.
