= Dachi Lordkipanidze =

Georgian footballer (born 2005)

Personal information
- Date of birth: 8 March 2005 (age 21)
- Place of birth: Tbilisi, Georgia
- Height: 1.86 m (6 ft 1 in)
- Positions: Defender; midfielder

Team information
- Current team: Cremonese

Youth career
- –2019: Atalanta
- 2019–2025: Cremonese

Senior career*
Years	Team	Apps	(Gls)
2024–	Cremonese	1	(0)
2026	→ Carrarese (loan)	3	(0)

International career^{‡}
2020	Georgia U16	2	(0)
2021–2022	Georgia U17	13	(0)
2023	Georgia U18	5	(0)
2023–2024	Georgia U19	9	(2)
2024–	Georgia U21	6	(0)
- * Club domestic league appearances and goals as of 13 May 2026 ‡ National team caps and goals as of 18 November 2025

Dachi Lordkipanidze (Georgian: დაჩი ლორთქიფანიძე; born 8 March 2005) is a Georgian professional footballer who plays as a defender or midfielder for Serie B club Cremonese.

== Early life ==
Lordkipanidze was born on 8 March 2005 and is the younger brother of Georgian footballer David Lordkipanidze. Born in Tbilisi, Georgia, he is a native of the city. At the age of nine, he moved with his family from Georgia to Italy.

== Club career ==
As a youth player, Lordkipanidze joined the youth academy of Serie A side Atalanta. Following his stint there, he joined the youth academy of Italian side Cremonese ahead of the 2020–21 season and was promoted to the club's senior team in 2024.

On 22 January 2026, Lordkipanidze was loaned to Serie B club Carrarese until the end of the season.

== International career ==
Lordkipanidze is a Georgia youth international. During September, October, and November 2025, he played for the Georgia national under-21 football team for 2027 UEFA European Under-21 Championship qualification.
