= Mario Tudose =

Romanian footballer

Personal information
- Full name: Mario Cristian Tudose
- Date of birth: 21 January 2005 (age 21)
- Place of birth: Pitești, Romania
- Height: 1.88 m (6 ft 2 in)
- Position: Centre back

Team information
- Current team: Argeș Pitești
- Number: 6

Youth career
- –2021: Argeș Pitești
- 2021–2023: Benfica

Senior career*
Years	Team	Apps	(Gls)
2023–	Argeș Pitești	92	(4)

International career^{‡}
2020–2021	Romania U16	4	(0)
2021	Romania U17	5	(0)
2022–2023	Romania U18	11	(2)
2023–2024	Romania U19	9	(2)
2024	Romania U20	2	(0)
2025–2026	Romania U21	7	(0)
- * Club domestic league appearances and goals as of 13 September 2026 ‡ National team caps and goals as of 25 July 2026

Mario Cristian Tudose (born 21 January 2005) is a Romanian professional footballer who plays as a centre back for Liga I club Argeș Pitești.

== Career ==
=== Benfica ===
On 19 August 2021, Benfica announced that they had enrolled the 16-year-old Tudose for €200,000.

=== FC Argeș ===
In the summer of 2023, Tudose returned to Argeș Pitești. As part of the agreement, Benfica retained 50% of the player's co-ownership rights.

== Career statistics ==
As of 13 September 2026

Appearances and goals by club, season and competition
Club	Season	League			Cupa României		Europe		Other		Total	
Club	Season	Division	Apps	Goals	Apps	Goals	Apps	Goals	Apps	Goals	Apps	Goals
Argeș Pitești
Argeș Pitești	2023–24	Liga II	25	0	0	0	—		—		25	0
Argeș Pitești	2024–25	Liga II	20	4	3	0	—		—		23	4
Argeș Pitești	2025–26	Liga I	39	0	6	0	—		—		45	0
Argeș Pitești	2026–27	Liga I	8	0	1	0	—		—		9	0
Career total			92	4	10	0	—		—		102	4

== Honours ==
Argeș Pitești

- Liga II: 2024–25
