= Luca Banu =

Romanian footballer (born 2005)

Personal information
- Full name: Luca Nicolae Banu
- Date of birth: 31 January 2005 (age 21)
- Place of birth: Constanța, Romania
- Height: 1.75 m (5 ft 9 in)
- Position: Defensive midfielder

Team information
- Current team: Farul Constanța/Metaloglobus București
- Number: 18/6

Youth career
- 2012–2022: Gheorghe Hagi Academy

Senior career*
Years	Team	Apps	(Gls)
2022–	Farul Constanța	20	(0)
2026–	Metaloglobus București	5	(0)

International career^{‡}
2021	Romania U16	2	(0)
2021–2022	Romania U17	7	(1)
2022–2023	Romania U18	6	(1)
2023	Romania U19	7	(1)
2025–2026	Romania U20	4	(0)
2026	Romania U21	1	(0)
- * Club domestic league appearances and goals as of 26 October 2026 ‡ National team caps and goals as of 30 September 2026

Luca Nicolae Banu (born 31 January 2005) is a Romanian professional footballer who plays as a defensive midfielder for Liga I club Farul Constanța and for Liga II club Metaloglobus București.

== Club career ==
=== Farul Constanta ===
He made his league debut on 2 October 2022 in Liga I match against UTA Arad.

== Career statistics ==
As of match played 26 October 2026

Appearances and goals by club, season and competition
Club	Season	League			Cupa României		Europe		Other		Total	
Club	Season	Division	Apps	Goals	Apps	Goals	Apps	Goals	Apps	Goals	Apps	Goals
Farul Constanța	2022–23	Liga I	2	0	0	0	—		—		2	0
Farul Constanța	2023–24	Liga I	3	0	2	0	0	0	0	0	5	0
Farul Constanța	2024–25	Liga I	8	0	3	0	—		—		11	0
Farul Constanța	2025–26	Liga I	4	0	2	0	—		0	0	6	0
Farul Constanța	2026–27	Liga I	3	0	1	0	—		—		4	0
Farul Constanța	Total		20	0	8	0	0	0	0	0	28	0
Metaloglobus București	2026–27	Liga II	5	0	—		—		—		5	0
Career total			25	0	8	0	0	0	0	0	33	0

== Honours ==
Farul Constanța

- Liga I: 2022–23
- Supercupa României runner-up: 2023
