= Anatoly Bulgakov (footballer, born 1979) =

Russian footballer

Personal information
- Full name: Anatoly Aleksandrovich Bulgakov
- Date of birth: 14 September 1979 (age 47)
- Place of birth: Moscow, Russia
- Height: 1.78 m (5 ft 10 in)
- Position: Defender

Senior career*
Years	Team	Apps	(Gls)
1999–2006	TP-47	186	(5)
2006–2007	→ AC Oulu (loan)	8	(0)
2007–2017	TP-47	40	(3)
- * Club domestic league appearances and goals

Anatoly Aleksandrovich Bulgakov (Russian: Анатолий Александрович Булгаков; born 14 September 1979) is a former Russian footballer. He was a defender.

== Club career ==
Having played heavily during TP-47's adequate 2004 season, he was dropped to the sidelines in 2005, playing just one game. However, in this fixture, he scored a goal for the first time in the Finnish Premier League.

His efforts during this season, however, were not sufficient to avoid TP-47's drop into the Ykkönen for the start of 2006.

== Personal life ==
His son Danila Bulgakov is also a professional footballer, playing for Ilves in Veikkausliiga.

In December 2006, Bulgakov was caught by police in Oulu, Finland, after driving under heavy influence of alcohol, and driving without license. In April 2007, he was given a probationary prison sentence of four months and 20 days by the district court of Oulu for aggravated drunk driving.
