= Adrian Zendelovski =

North Macedonian footballer (born 2005

Adrian Zendelovski Adrian Zendeli
Personal information
- Full name: Adrian Zendelovski
- Date of birth: 6 February 2005 (age 21)
- Place of birth: Malmö, Sweden
- Height: 1.75 m (5 ft 9 in)
- Position: Central midfielder

Team information
- Current team: FC Struga
- Number: 8

Youth career
- 2010–2023: Malmö FF

Senior career*
Years	Team	Apps	(Gls)
2024	Skövde AIK	2	(0)
2024	→ BK Olympic (loan)	9	(1)
2025	BK Olympic	20	(5)
2026–	FC Struga	14	(0)

International career^{‡}
2021–2022	North Macedonia U17	7	(0)
2022–2023	North Macedonia U18	6	(1)
2023–2024	North Macedonia U19	7	(2)
2024–2025	North Macedonia U21	13	(0)
- * Club domestic league appearances and goals as of 18 June 2026 ‡ National team caps and goals as of 11 May 2026

Adrian Zendelovski (Macedonian: Адриан Зенделовски; Albanian: Adrian Zendeli;born 6 February 2005) is a North Macedonian professional footballer who plays as a central midfielder for Prva liga club FC Struga.

== Club career ==
Zendelovski began his career in the academy of Malmö FF at the age of 5. In January 2022 he trialled with Genoa CFC, and later in the year he won the 2022 P17 Allsvenskan with Malmö FF's under-17s. For the 2023 season he was the club's under-19s captain.

At the recommendation of former Malmö FF teammate Isak Bjerkebo, Zendelovski signed with Skövde AIK for the 2024 season. He only made 2 Superettan appearances in the spring, and signed for BK Olympic on loan, a third tier club from Malmö, for the remainder of the season. The transfer was made permanent and he developed into a key player for BK Olympic in 2025, scoring 5 times in 20 appearances from his midfield position.

On 8 January 2026, Zendelovski signed for North Macedonian team FC Struga, playing in the top flight Prva liga, on a contract until the summer of 2029.

== International career ==
Zendelovski is a youth international for North Macedonia.
