= Petar Miloševski Training Centre =

Football complex in Skopje, North Macedonia

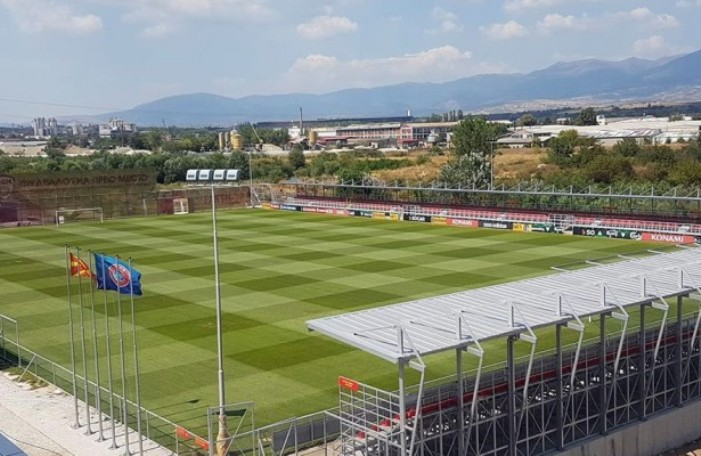
- Interactive map of Petar Miloševski Training Centre
- Location: Football Federation of North Macedonia HQ, Skopje, North Macedonia
- Coordinates: 41.9874°N 21.4811°E
- Owner: Football Federation of North Macedonia
- Capacity: 2,500

Construction
- Opened: 2013

Tenants
- North Macedonia national under-21 football team North Macedonia national under-19 football team North Macedonia national under-17 football team

Petar Miloševski Training Centre (Macedonian: Тренинг Центар Петар Милошевски, romanized: Trening Centar Petar Miloševski) is a football multi-pitch complex in Skopje, North Macedonia. It is the official training centre of the Football Federation of North Macedonia (FFM). Originally, it was named as Training Centre FFM, but in 2014 it is renamed after the former football national team goalkeeper Petar Miloševski, who died in a car wreck earlier that year.

It is usually the home ground of the Macedonian national youth football teams. The seating capacity of the centre is 2,500 people.
