= Calixte Ligue =

Swiss footballer (born 2005)

Personal information
- Full name: Calixte Paul Ligue Junior
- Date of birth: 21 March 2005 (age 21)
- Place of birth: Zürich, Switzerland
- Height: 1.80 m (5 ft 11 in)
- Position: Defender

Team information
- Current team: Rijeka (on loan from Venezia)
- Number: 42

Youth career
- 2015–2023: Zürich

Senior career*
Years	Team	Apps	(Gls)
2023–2025	Zürich U21	41	(17)
2023–2026	Zürich	54	(1)
2026–	Venezia	0	(0)
2026	→ Mantova (loan)	1	(0)
2026–	→ Rijeka (loan)	0	(0)

International career^{‡}
2021–2022	Switzerland U17	8	(0)
2022–2023	Switzerland U18	7	(0)
2023–2024	Switzerland U19	11	(4)
2024	Switzerland U20	1	(0)
2025	Switzerland U21	2	(0)
- * Club domestic league appearances and goals as of 7 September 2026 ‡ National team caps and goals as of 24 May 2025

Calixte Paul Ligue Junior (born 21 March 2005) is a Swiss professional footballer who plays as a defender for Croatian Football League club Rijeka, on loan from Serie A club Venezia.

== Club career ==
Born in Zürich, Ligue started his career with FC Zürich, and received his first pair of football boots from former Cameroonian footballer Patrick Bengondo. He progressed through the Zürich academy, making his debut in the 2022–23 season.

On 5 March 2023, Ligue came on as a 76th minute substitute for Fidan Aliti in a Swiss Super League game against Servette. Two minutes later, he scored the equalising goal in the 1–1 draw.

On 29 January 2026, Ligue signed with Serie B club Venezia. On the next day, he was loaned to Mantova until 30 June 2026.

== International career ==
Born in Switzerland, Ligue is of Ivorian descent. He has represented Switzerland at under-17 and under-18 level.

== Career statistics ==
=== Club ===
As of 20 December 2025.

Appearances and goals by club, season and competition
Club	Season	League			National Cup		League Cup		Other		Total	
Club	Season	Division	Apps	Goals	Apps	Goals	Apps	Goals	Apps	Goals	Apps	Goals
Zürich II	2022–23	Promotion League	22	7	–		–		–		22	7
Zürich II	2023–24	Promotion League	14	9	–		–		–		14	9
Zürich II	2024–25	Promotion League	3	1	–		–		–		3	1
Zürich II total			39	17	0	0	0	0	0	0	39	17
Zürich	2022–23	Swiss Super League	9	1	0	0	–		0	0	9	1
Zürich	2023–24	Swiss Super League	8	0	1	0	–		–		9	0
Zürich	2024–25	Swiss Super League	28	0	3	0	–		1 (Note: Appearance(s) in the Conference League.)	0	32	0
Zürich	2025–26	Swiss Super League	9	0	1	0	–		–		10	0
Zürich total			54	1	5	0	0	0	1	0	60	1
Career total			93	18	5	0	0	0	1	0	99	18
