= Junior Nsangou =

Polish footballer (born 2005)

Personal information
- Full name: Yvan Junior Nsangou
- Date of birth: 2 September 2005 (age 21)
- Place of birth: Douala, Cameroon
- Position: Striker

Team information
- Current team: Śląsk Wrocław II

Youth career
- –2015: Droylsden
- 2015–2024: Blackburn Rovers

Senior career*
Years	Team	Apps	(Gls)
2024–2025	Albacete B	22	(1)
2026–	Śląsk Wrocław II	0	(0)

International career^{‡}
2023	Poland U19	7	(2)
2023	Poland U20	1	(0)
- * Club domestic league appearances and goals as of 19:28, 1 June 2025 (UTC) ‡ National team caps and goals as of 19 March 2024

Yvan Junior Nsangou (born 2 September 2005) is a professional footballer who plays as a striker for II liga club Śląsk Wrocław II. Born in Cameroon, he is a Poland youth international.

== Early life ==
Nsangou moved to England at the age of nine.

== Career ==
Nsangou is eligible for play for Cameroon through his birth parents, Poland through his father and stepmother, and England where he has resided throughout the majority of his life. He represented the country of his stepmother at the 2023 UEFA European Under-19 Championship.

On 7 August 2024, Nsangou joined Atlético Albacete.

He spent the 2025–26 season without a club. On 23 July 2026, he signed with Polish third division club Śląsk Wrocław II.

== Personal life ==
Nsangou was born in Cameroon to a Cameroonian footballer Alirou Nsangou. He has three younger half-siblings, two of whom are also footballers: sister Aisha, who is a Polish women's youth international, and brother Jonathan who is also part of Everton's academy.
