= Kosovo national under-19 football team =

National association football team

Kosovo Under-19
- Nickname: Dardanët (Dardanians)
- Association: Federata e Futbollit e Kosovës (FFK)
- Confederation: UEFA (Europe)
- Head coach: Albert Bunjaku
- Captain: Rotation
- Most caps: Dior Gërbovci (13) (Note: There may be more matches or goals because some match data is missing.)
- Top scorer: Eliot Bujupi; Leotrim Kryeziu (5)
- Home stadium: FFK National Educational Camp
- FIFA code: KOS
First colours	Second colours	Third colours

First international
- Austria 1–0 Kosovo (Mittersill, Austria; 3 October 2017)

Biggest win
- Kosovo 7–0 Gibraltar (Manavgat, Turkey; 27 March 2026)

Biggest defeat
- Portugal 5–0 Kosovo (Porto, Portugal; 21 March 2018)

The Kosovo national under-19 football team (Albanian: Kombëtarja e futbollit të Kosovës nën 19 vjeç; Serbian: Фудбалска репрезентација Косова до 19. године, romanized: Fudbalska reprezentacija Kosova do 19. godine) is the national under-19 football team of Kosovo and is controlled by the Football Federation of Kosovo.

== History ==
=== Permitting by FIFA to play friendlies ===
On 6 February 2013, FIFA gave the permission to play international friendly games against other member associations. Whereas, on 13 January 2014, there was a change of this permit that forbade Kosovo to play against the national teams of the countries of the former Yugoslavia. Club teams were also allowed to play friendlies and this happened after a FIFA Emergency Committee meeting. However, it was stipulated that clubs and representative teams of the Football Federation of Kosovo may not display national symbols as flags, emblems, etc. or play national anthems. The go-ahead was given after meetings between the Football Association of Serbia and Sepp Blatter.

=== Membership in UEFA and FIFA ===
In September 2015 at an UEFA Executive Committee meeting in Malta was approved the request from the federation to the admission in UEFA to the next Ordinary Congress to be held in Budapest. On 3 May 2016, at the Ordinary Congress. Kosovo were accepted into UEFA after members voted 28–24 in favor of Kosovo. Ten days later, Kosovo was accepted in FIFA during their 66th congress in Mexico with 141 votes in favour and 23 against.

== Team image ==
=== Kits and crest ===
The Kosovo national team kits were mostly red and black before the declaration of independence, with occasional variations over the years. After independence, the kits have primarily been blue and yellow. On 5 October 2016, Kosovo signed a four-year contract with the Spanish sportswear company Kelme, becoming the first official kit supplier of Kosovo following the country's membership in UEFA and FIFA. On 5 February 2026, Kosovo signed a two-year contract with the German sportswear company Adidas, making it the national team's current kit supplier.

==== Kit sponsorship ====
Kit supplier	Period	Contract	
Kit supplier	Period	Announcement	Duration
Kelme	2016–2018	5 October 2016	2016–2020 (4 years)
Fourteen	2018–2022	16 June 2018	2018–2022 (4 years)
Erreà	2023–2026	23 February 2023	2023–2026 (3 years)
Adidas	2026–present	5 February 2026	2026–2028 (2 years)

== Fixtures and results ==
=== 2026 ===
24 March UEFA Euro 2027 qualification	Armenia	1–1	Kosovo	Manavgat, Turkey
11:00	Batoian 81' (pen.)	Report	Mehmeti 19'	Stadium: Arslan Zeki Demirci Sports Complex; Referee: Szabolcs Kovacs (Romania)

27 March UEFA Euro 2027 qualification	Kosovo	7–0	Gibraltar	Manavgat, Turkey
11:00	R. Ahmeti 20'; D. Ahmeti 19'; Mehmeti 28', 44'; Gashi 63'; Uka 79'	Report		Stadium: Arslan Zeki Demirci Sports Complex; Referee: Szabolcs Kovacs (Romania)

30 March UEFA Euro 2027 qualification	Kosovo	3–1	Turkey	Manavgat, Turkey
15:00	R. Ahmeti 8' (pen.); Mehmeti 20'; Gabrica 89'	Report	Demirbağ 51'	Stadium: Arslan Zeki Demirci Sports Complex; Referee: Matteo Marchetti (Italy)

== Players ==
=== Current squad ===
- The following players were called up for the UEFA Euro 2027 qualifications from 24 to 30 March 2026.

No.	Pos.	Player	Date of birth (age)	Club (Note: The club listed is the club for which the player last played a competitive match prior to the tournament.)
1	GK	Arlind Qela	13 December 2008 (age 17)	(German Football Association) Eintracht Braunschweig U19
12	GK	Ismajl Hasimi	1 April 2008 (age 18)	(Football Federation of Kosovo) Prishtina U19
2	DF	Albion Rashica	30 December 2008 (age 17)	(Football Association of Finland) Inter Turku II
3	DF	Aldon Osmani	7 October 2008 (age 18)	(Football Federation of Kosovo) 2 Korriku U19
4	DF	Leka Podvorica	19 February 2008 (age 18)	(Portuguese Football Federation) Famalicão U19
5	DF	Diart Gashi	3 February 2008 (age 18)	(German Football Association) Hertha BSC U19
13	DF	Redon Zekaj	17 March 2008 (age 18)	(Football Federation of Kosovo) Ballkani U19
15	DF	Edon Krasniqi	2 April 2008 (age 18)	(German Football Association) 1860 Munich U19
21	DF	Besar Dema	26 February 2008 (age 18)	(Swiss Football Association) Young Boys U19
6	MF	Ardian Sopaj	4 October 2008 (age 18)	(Football Federation of Kosovo) Malisheva U21
8	MF	Alban Mehmetaj	7 January 2008 (age 18)	(German Football Association) 1. FC Kaiserslautern U19
9	MF	Donart Ahmeti	10 January 2008 (age 18)	(Football Federation of Kosovo) Prishtina U19
11	MF	Leonit Gabrica	6 January 2008 (age 18)	(Football Federation of Kosovo) Prishtina U19
14	MF	Omer Shala	4 September 2008 (age 18)	(Football Federation of Kosovo) 2 Korriku U19
17	MF	Agon Uka	1 September 2008 (age 18)	(Swedish Football Association) Jönköpings Södra
18	MF	Orges Maçastena	8 November 2008 (age 18)	(United States Soccer Federation) Maryland United
20	MF	Bleonit Jashari	24 August 2008 (age 18)	(Football Association of Finland) Inter Turku U19
7	FW	Lorik Mehmeti	5 June 2008 (age 18)	(Football Federation of Kosovo) Prishtina U19
10	FW	Rin Ahmeti	9 August 2008 (age 18)	(Football Federation of Kosovo) Prishtina
19	FW	Loris Balaj	12 April 2008 (age 18)	(Football Federation of Kosovo) Prishtina U19

== Competition records ==
=== UEFA European Championship ===
UEFA European Championship record											Qualification record					
Era	Year	Round	Pos	Pld	W	D	L	GF	GA	Squad	Pld	W	D	L	GF	GA
FIFA	(France) 1951 to (West Germany) 1954	Part of Yugoslavia and Serbia and Montenegro									—N/a					
UEFA	(Italy) 1955 to (East Germany) 1980	Part of Yugoslavia and Serbia and Montenegro									—N/a					
U18	(West Germany) 1981 to (Sweden) 1999	Part of Yugoslavia and Serbia and Montenegro									—N/a					
U18	(Germany) 2000 to (Finland) 2001	Not a FIFA member									Not a FIFA member					
U19	(Norway) 2002 to (Greece) 2015	Not a FIFA member									Not a FIFA member					
U19	(Germany) 2016 to (Georgia (country)) 2017	Could not enter									—					
U19	(Finland) 2018	Did not qualify									6	3	0	3	7	11
U19	(Armenia) 2019	Did not qualify									3	0	2	1	1	4
U19	(Northern Ireland) 2020	Canceled due to COVID-19 pandemic									—					
U19	(Romania) 2021	Canceled due to COVID-19 pandemic									—					
U19	(Slovakia) 2022	Did not qualify									3	0	0	3	0	7
U19	(Malta) 2023	Did not qualify									3	0	1	2	0	4
U19	(Northern Ireland) 2024	Did not qualify									6	2	2	2	9	7
U19	(Romania) 2025	Did not qualify									3	2	0	1	6	7
U19	(Wales) 2026	To be determined														
Total		—	0/18	0	0	0	0	0	0	—	24	7	5	12	23	40

== See also ==
Men's

- National team
- Under-21
- Under-17
- Under-15
- Futsal

Women's

- National team
- Under-19
- Under-17
