= 2024 UEFA European Under-19 Championship squads =

Player listings in youth football competition

The 2024 UEFA European Under-19 Championship was an international football tournament held in Northern Ireland from 15 to 28 July 2024. Players born on or after 1 January 2005 were eligible to participate.

Each national team submitted a squad of 20 players, two of whom had to be goalkeepers.

Players in boldface have been capped at full international level since the tournament.

The age listed for each player is their age as of 15 July 2024, the first day of the tournament.

== Group A ==
=== Italy ===
The final squad was announced on 9 July 2024.

Head coach: Bernardo Corradi

No.	Pos.	Player	Date of birth (age)	Club
1	GK	Federico Magro	10 January 2005 (aged 19)	(Italian Football Federation) Lazio
12	GK	Renato Marin	10 July 2006 (aged 18)	(Italian Football Federation) Roma
2	DF	Vittorio Magni	1 June 2006 (aged 18)	(Italian Football Federation) Milan
3	DF	**Davide Bartesaghi**	29 December 2005 (aged 18)	(Italian Football Federation) Milan
4	DF	**Fabio Chiarodia**	5 June 2005 (aged 19)	(German Football Association) Borussia Mönchengladbach
6	DF	**Filippo Mane**	8 March 2005 (aged 19)	(German Football Association) Borussia Dortmund
13	DF	Christian Corradi	21 February 2005 (aged 19)	(Italian Football Federation) Hellas Verona
14	DF	Filippo Pagnucco	9 February 2006 (aged 18)	(Italian Football Federation) Juventus
5	MF	**Luca Lipani**	18 May 2005 (aged 19)	(Italian Football Federation) Sassuolo
8	MF	Luca Di Maggio	31 March 2005 (aged 19)	(Italian Football Federation) Inter
15	MF	Jonas Harder	30 September 2005 (aged 18)	(Italian Football Federation) Fiorentina
16	MF	Mattia Mannini	8 July 2006 (aged 18)	(Italian Football Federation) Roma
17	MF	Aaron Ciammaglichella	26 January 2005 (aged 19)	(Italian Football Federation) Torino
18	MF	Kevin Zeroli	11 January 2005 (aged 19)	(Italian Football Federation) Milan
19	MF	Marco Romano	1 March 2006 (aged 18)	(Italian Football Federation) Genoa
7	FW	Diego Sia	10 March 2006 (aged 18)	(Italian Football Federation) Milan
9	FW	Tommaso Ebone	9 November 2005 (aged 18)	(Italian Football Federation) Bologna
10	FW	**Simone Pafundi**	14 March 2006 (aged 18)	(Swiss Football Association) Lausanne
11	FW	**Francesco Camarda**	10 March 2008 (aged 16)	(Italian Football Federation) Milan
20	FW	Lorenzo Anghelè	26 February 2005 (aged 19)	(Italian Football Federation) Juventus

=== Northern Ireland ===
The final squad was announced on 11 July 2024.

Head coach: Gareth McAuley

No.	Pos.	Player	Date of birth (age)	Club
1	GK	Pierce Charles	21 July 2005 (aged 18)	(The Football Association) Sheffield Wednesday
12	GK	Mason Munn	30 March 2006 (aged 18)	(Scottish Football Association) Rangers
4	DF	Josh Briggs	14 March 2006 (aged 18)	(The Football Association) West Ham United
5	DF	George Goodman	1 December 2006 (aged 17)	(The Football Association) Bradford City
6	DF	Gallagher Lennon	19 December 2005 (aged 18)	(Scottish Football Association) St Mirren
15	DF	Tom Atcheson	22 September 2006 (aged 17)	(The Football Association) Blackburn Rovers
16	DF	Brendan Hamilton	20 May 2006 (aged 18)	(Scottish Football Association) Aberdeen
17	DF	Daithí McCallion	8 April 2005 (aged 19)	(Irish Football Association) Derry City
2	MF	Conor Barr	19 December 2005 (aged 18)	(Irish Football Association) Derry City
3	MF	Joel Thompson	25 July 2005 (aged 18)	(The Football Association) Nottingham Forest
7	MF	Lewis Trickett	27 April 2005 (aged 19)	(The Football Association) Accrington Stanley
8	MF	Blaine McClure	5 February 2007 (aged 17)	(Scottish Football Association) Rangers
10	MF	Dylan Stitt	30 June 2007 (aged 17)	(The Football Association) Luton Town
11	MF	Kieran Morrison	9 November 2006 (aged 17)	(The Football Association) Liverpool
14	MF	Jack Doherty	2 January 2007 (aged 17)	(The Football Association) Fleetwood Town
19	MF	Corey Smith	24 January 2005 (aged 19)	(Irish Football Association) Larne
9	FW	Braiden Graham	7 November 2007 (aged 16)	(The Football Association) Everton
13	FW	Reece Evans	25 September 2005 (aged 18)	(The Football Association) Reading
18	FW	Sam Glenfield	10 May 2005 (aged 19)	(The Football Association) Fleetwood Town
20	FW	Aodhan Doherty	3 May 2006 (aged 18)	(The Football Association) Blackburn Rovers

=== Norway ===
The final squad was announced on 2 July 2024.

Head coach: (Portugal) Luís Pimenta

No.	Pos.	Player	Date of birth (age)	Club
1	GK	Martin Børsheim	18 February 2005 (aged 19)	(Norwegian Football Federation) Brann
12	GK	Sander Østraat	2 February 2005 (aged 19)	(Norwegian Football Federation) HamKam
2	DF	Filip Loftesnes-Bjune	8 April 2005 (aged 19)	(Norwegian Football Federation) Sandefjord
3	DF	Aleksander Andresen	6 April 2005 (aged 19)	(Norwegian Football Federation) Stabæk
4	DF	Rasmus Holten	20 February 2005 (aged 19)	(Norwegian Football Federation) Mjøndalen
5	DF	Simen Vatne Haram	26 January 2005 (aged 19)	(Norwegian Football Federation) Aalesund
13	DF	Håkon Røsten	21 February 2005 (aged 19)	(Norwegian Football Federation) Rosenborg
14	DF	Aleksander Hammer Kjelsen	3 January 2005 (aged 19)	(Norwegian Football Federation) Vålerenga
16	DF	Vetle Auklend	22 March 2005 (aged 19)	(Norwegian Football Federation) Viking
6	MF	Eivind Helland	25 April 2005 (aged 19)	(Norwegian Football Federation) Brann
8	MF	Travis Hernes	4 November 2005 (aged 18)	(The Football Association) Newcastle United
10	MF	Sondre Granaas	30 August 2006 (aged 17)	(Norwegian Football Federation) Molde
18	MF	Mats Pedersen	27 April 2005 (aged 19)	(Norwegian Football Federation) Mjøndalen
20	MF	Daniel Braut	1 May 2005 (aged 19)	(Norwegian Football Federation) Sandnes Ulf
22	MF	Kristoffer Haukås Steinset	15 September 2005 (aged 18)	(Norwegian Football Federation) Hødd
7	FW	Julian Gonstad	29 June 2006 (aged 18)	(Norwegian Football Federation) HamKam
9	FW	Benjamin Faraas	8 September 2005 (aged 18)	(Royal Belgian Football Association) Club Brugge
11	FW	Edvin Austbø	1 May 2005 (aged 19)	(Norwegian Football Federation) Viking
17	FW	Bork Bang-Kittilsen	22 March 2005 (aged 19)	(Norwegian Football Federation) Odd
19	FW	Sander Kilen	30 May 2005 (aged 19)	(Norwegian Football Federation) Aalesund

=== Ukraine ===
The final squad was announced on 2 July 2024.

Head coach: Dmytro Mykhaylenko

No.	Pos.	Player	Date of birth (age)	Club
1	GK	Markiyan Bakus	20 January 2006 (aged 18)	(Ukrainian Association of Football) Rukh Lviv
12	GK	Vladyslav Krapyvtsov	25 June 2005 (aged 19)	(Ukrainian Association of Football) Dnipro-1
2	DF	Anton Drozd	6 August 2005 (aged 18)	(Ukrainian Association of Football) Shakhtar Donetsk
3	DF	Ivan Yermachkov	8 June 2005 (aged 19)	(German Football Association) Wuppertaler SV
4	DF	Kyrylo Dihtyar	25 November 2007 (aged 16)	(Ukrainian Association of Football) Metalist Kharkiv
5	DF	Mykola Oharkov	18 February 2005 (aged 19)	(Ukrainian Association of Football) Shakhtar Donetsk
14	DF	Taras Mykhavko	30 May 2005 (aged 19)	(Ukrainian Association of Football) Dynamo Kyiv
20	DF	Oleksiy Husyev	16 March 2005 (aged 19)	(Ukrainian Association of Football) Dynamo Kyiv
21	DF	Maksym Melnychenko (captain)	12 February 2005 (aged 19)	(Ukrainian Association of Football) Karpaty Lviv
6	MF	Samuel Obinaya	25 August 2005 (aged 18)	(Ukrainian Association of Football) Metalist 1925 Kharkiv
7	MF	Kristian Shevchenko	10 November 2006 (aged 17)	(The Football Association) Watford
8	MF	Daniil Vashchenko	2 October 2005 (aged 18)	(Ukrainian Association of Football) Oleksandriya
10	MF	Andriy Matkevych	11 January 2005 (aged 19)	(Ukrainian Association of Football) Dynamo Kyiv
11	MF	Danylo Krevsun	21 April 2005 (aged 19)	(German Football Association) Borussia Dortmund
15	MF	Timur Tutierov	11 June 2005 (aged 19)	(The Football Association) Sunderland
17	MF	Ramik Hadzhyiev	14 August 2005 (aged 18)	(Ukrainian Association of Football) Dnipro-1
18	MF	Hennadiy Synchuk	10 July 2006 (aged 18)	(Ukrainian Association of Football) Metalist Kharkiv
22	MF	Viktor Tsukanov	4 February 2006 (aged 18)	(Ukrainian Association of Football) Shakhtar Donetsk
9	FW	Matviy Ponomarenko	11 January 2006 (aged 18)	(Ukrainian Association of Football) Dynamo Kyiv
19	FW	Dmytro Bohdanov	6 March 2007 (aged 17)	(German Football Association) Dynamo Dresden

== Group B ==
=== Denmark ===
The final squad was announced on 1 July 2024. On 12 July, six changes were made from the final squad.

Head coach: Morten Eskesen

No.	Pos.	Player	Date of birth (age)	Club
1	GK	Andreas Dithmer	1 August 2005 (aged 18)	(Royal Dutch Football Association) Utrecht
16	GK	Aske Andrésen	12 July 2005 (aged 19)	(Danish Football Association) Silkeborg
2	DF	Cornelius Olsson	27 February 2006 (aged 18)	(Danish Football Association) Copenhagen
3	DF	Mads Nybo	21 March 2005 (aged 19)	(Portuguese Football Federation) Mafra
4	DF	Ludwig Vraa-Jensen	23 June 2005 (aged 19)	(Danish Football Association) Brøndby
5	DF	Frederik Roslyng	25 December 2005 (aged 18)	(Danish Football Association) Horsens
11	DF	Hjalte Bidstrup	15 February 2006 (aged 18)	(Danish Football Association) Copenhagen
12	DF	Lasse Flø	15 October 2005 (aged 18)	(Danish Football Association) Velje
13	DF	Lucas Høgsberg	23 June 2006 (aged 18)	(Danish Football Association) Nordsjælland
15	DF	Villads Nielsen	29 January 2005 (aged 19)	(Norwegian Football Federation) Bodø/Glimt
20	DF	Tristan Andrew	5 March 2006 (aged 18)	(Danish Football Association) Copenhagen
6	MF	Justin Janssen	25 July 2006 (aged 17)	(Danish Football Association) Nordsjælland
7	MF	Oskar Boesen	5 May 2005 (aged 19)	(Danish Football Association) Silkeborg
8	MF	Mads Bomholt	30 December 2005 (aged 18)	(Danish Football Association) AaB
10	MF	Thomas Jørgensen	30 September 2005 (aged 18)	(Danish Football Association) Copenhagen
9	FW	Mikel Gogorza	27 September 2006 (aged 17)	(Danish Football Association) Midtjylland
14	FW	Alexander Simmelhack	11 November 2005 (aged 18)	(Danish Football Association) Copenhagen
17	FW	Oscar Schwartau	17 May 2006 (aged 18)	(Danish Football Association) Brøndby
18	FW	Valdemar Byskov	25 January 2005 (aged 19)	(Danish Football Association) Midtjylland
19	FW	Michael Opoku	20 July 2005 (aged 18)	(Danish Football Association) Lyngby

=== France ===
The 30-men preliminary squad was announced on 6 June 2024. The final squad was announced on 15 July.

Head coach: Bernard Diomède

No.	Pos.	Player	Date of birth (age)	Club
1	GK	Justin Bengui	9 July 2005 (aged 19)	(French Football Federation) Lyon
16	GK	Alexis Mirbach	4 March 2005 (aged 19)	(French Football Federation) Metz
2	DF	Saël Kumbedi	26 March 2005 (aged 19)	(French Football Federation) Lyon
3	DF	Aboubaka Soumahoro	4 February 2005 (aged 19)	(French Football Federation) Paris FC
4	DF	Yoni Gomis	23 September 2005 (aged 18)	(French Football Federation) Le Havre
5	DF	Jérémy Jacquet	13 July 2005 (aged 19)	(French Football Federation) Rennes
12	DF	**Mamadou Sarr**	29 August 2005 (aged 18)	(Royal Belgian Football Association) RWD Molenbeek
15	DF	Elyaz Zidane	26 December 2005 (aged 18)	(Royal Spanish Football Federation) Real Betis
6	MF	Mayssam Benama	9 March 2005 (aged 19)	(French Football Federation) Monaco
8	MF	Valentin Atangana	25 August 2005 (aged 18)	(French Football Federation) Reims
10	MF	Dehmaine Assoumani	17 April 2005 (aged 19)	(French Football Federation) Nantes
14	MF	Senny Mayulu	17 May 2006 (aged 18)	(French Football Federation) Paris Saint-Germain
18	MF	Mathis Amougou	18 January 2006 (aged 18)	(French Football Federation) Saint-Étienne
20	MF	Saïmon Bouabré	1 June 2006 (aged 18)	(French Football Federation) Monaco
7	FW	Lucas Michal	22 June 2005 (aged 19)	(French Football Federation) Monaco
9	FW	Steve Ngoura	22 February 2005 (aged 19)	(French Football Federation) Le Havre
11	FW	Jean-Mattéo Bahoya	7 May 2005 (aged 19)	(German Football Association) Eintracht Frankfurt
13	FW	Ayman Aiki	25 June 2005 (aged 19)	(French Football Federation) Saint-Étienne
17	FW	Tidiam Gomis	8 August 2006 (aged 17)	(French Football Federation) Caen
19	FW	Eli Junior Kroupi	23 June 2006 (aged 18)	(French Football Federation) Lorient

=== Spain ===
A 25-men preliminary squad was announced on 24 June 2024. The final squad was announced on 12 July.

Head coach: José Lana

No.	Pos.	Player	Date of birth (age)	Club
1	GK	Fran González	25 June 2005 (aged 19)	(Royal Spanish Football Federation) Real Madrid
13	GK	Raúl Jiménez	16 February 2006 (aged 18)	(Royal Spanish Football Federation) Valencia
3	DF	Julio Díaz	10 January 2005 (aged 19)	(Royal Spanish Football Federation) Atlético Madrid
4	DF	Simo Keddari	3 February 2005 (aged 19)	(Qatar Football Association) Al-Arabi
5	DF	Yarek Gasiorowski	12 January 2005 (aged 19)	(Royal Spanish Football Federation) Valencia
14	DF	Jacobo Ramón	6 January 2005 (aged 19)	(Royal Spanish Football Federation) Real Madrid
18	DF	Dani Muñoz	19 July 2006 (aged 17)	(Royal Spanish Football Federation) Atlético Madrid
6	MF	Gerard Hernández	31 March 2005 (aged 19)	(Royal Spanish Football Federation) Villarreal
8	MF	Miguel Carvalho	24 March 2005 (aged 19)	(Royal Spanish Football Federation) Espanyol
10	MF	Pol Fortuny	15 March 2005 (aged 19)	(Royal Spanish Football Federation) Real Madrid
15	MF	Cristian Perea	17 August 2005 (aged 18)	(Royal Spanish Football Federation) Real Madrid
16	MF	Chema Andrés	25 April 2005 (aged 19)	(Royal Spanish Football Federation) Real Madrid
20	MF	Rayane Belaid	11 February 2005 (aged 19)	(Royal Spanish Football Federation) Atlético Madrid
2	FW	David Mella	23 May 2005 (aged 19)	(Royal Spanish Football Federation) Deportivo La Coruña
7	FW	**Assane Diao**	7 September 2005 (aged 18)	(Royal Spanish Football Federation) Real Betis
9	FW	Iker Bravo	13 January 2005 (aged 19)	(Royal Spanish Football Federation) Real Madrid
11	FW	Dani Rodríguez	9 August 2005 (aged 18)	(Royal Spanish Football Federation) Barcelona
12	FW	Dani Díaz	22 June 2006 (aged 18)	(Royal Spanish Football Federation) Real Sociedad
17	FW	**Jesús Rodríguez**	21 November 2005 (aged 18)	(Royal Spanish Football Federation) Real Betis
19	FW	Yanis Senhadji	5 January 2005 (aged 19)	(Royal Spanish Football Federation) Real Betis

=== Turkey ===
The final squad was announced on 25 June 2024.

Head coach: Soykan Başar

No.	Pos.	Player	Date of birth (age)	Club
1	GK	Deniz Ertaş	20 March 2005 (aged 19)	(Turkish Football Federation) Konyaspor
23	GK	Mert Furkan Bayram	2 January 2005 (aged 19)	(Turkish Football Federation) Altınordu
2	DF	Ali Turap Bülbül	25 January 2005 (aged 19)	(Turkish Football Federation) Galatasaray
3	DF	Berkay Yılmaz	25 February 2005 (aged 19)	(German Football Association) SC Freiburg
4	DF	Yiğit Fidan	11 May 2006 (aged 18)	(Turkish Football Federation) Bursaspor
5	DF	Efe Sarıkaya	30 November 2005 (aged 18)	(French Football Federation) Grenoble
14	DF	Hasan Berat Kayalı	15 April 2005 (aged 19)	(Turkish Football Federation) Altınordu
22	DF	Haluk Mustafa Tan	27 April 2005 (aged 19)	(Turkish Football Federation) Samsunspor
6	MF	Yusuf Sertkaya	20 August 2005 (aged 18)	(Turkish Football Federation) Bodrum
7	MF	Baran Ali Gezek	26 August 2005 (aged 18)	(Turkish Football Federation) Kayserispor
8	MF	Diren Dağdeviren	8 March 2005 (aged 19)	(German Football Association) TSG 1899 Hoffenheim
10	MF	Emre Uzun	20 June 2005 (aged 19)	(Turkish Football Federation) Antalyaspor
13	MF	Muhammed Eren Arıkan	29 January 2005 (aged 19)	(Turkish Football Federation) Kayserispor
15	MF	Emirhan Başyiğit	25 April 2005 (aged 19)	(Turkish Football Federation) Beyoğlu Yeni Çarşı
16	MF	İsak Vural	28 May 2006 (aged 18)	(Italian Football Federation) Frosinone
18	MF	Fahri Kerem Ay	1 January 2005 (aged 19)	(Turkish Football Federation) Beşiktaş
20	MF	Emir Bars	11 April 2005 (aged 19)	(Royal Dutch Football Association) PSV
9	FW	Poyraz Yıldırım	15 January 2005 (aged 19)	(Turkish Football Federation) Trabzonspor
11	FW	Emirhan Demircan	20 January 2005 (aged 19)	(German Football Association) Bayern Munich
19	FW	Halil Özdemir	18 August 2005 (aged 18)	(Royal Belgian Football Association) Mechelen
