= 2025 UEFA European Under-21 Championship squads =

Football team member listings

The following is a list of squads for all sixteen national teams that competed at the 2025 UEFA European Under-21 Championship. Each national team had to submit a final squad of 23 players, three of whom had to be goalkeepers.

Players in boldface have been capped at full international level either prior to the completion of the tournament or afterwards.

Age, caps, goals and club as of 11 June 2025.

== Group A ==
=== Italy ===
Head coach: Carmine Nunziata

The following 23 players were named in Italy's final squad.

No.	Pos.	Player	Date of birth (age)	Caps	Goals	Club
1	GK	Sebastiano Desplanches	11 March 2003 (aged 22)	15	0	(Italian Football Federation) Palermo
2	DF	Mattia Zanotti	11 February 2003 (aged 22)	17	0	(Swiss Football Association) Lugano
3	DF	**Matteo Ruggeri**	11 July 2002 (aged 22)	15	0	(Italian Football Federation) Atalanta
4	MF	Matteo Prati	28 December 2003 (aged 21)	14	1	(Italian Football Federation) Cagliari
5	DF	Lorenzo Pirola	20 February 2002 (aged 23)	25	3	(Hellenic Football Federation) Olympiacos
6	DF	Daniele Ghilardi	6 January 2003 (aged 22)	15	1	(Italian Football Federation) Hellas Verona
7	MF	**Cher Ndour**	27 July 2004 (aged 20)	19	2	(Italian Football Federation) Fiorentina
8	MF	Cesare Casadei	10 January 2003 (aged 22)	15	4	(Italian Football Federation) Torino
9	FW	Giuseppe Ambrosino	10 September 2003 (aged 21)	10	1	(Italian Football Federation) Frosinone
10	FW	**Wilfried Gnonto**	5 November 2003 (aged 21)	16	5	(The Football Association) Leeds United
11	MF	Tommaso Baldanzi	23 March 2003 (aged 22)	10	5	(Italian Football Federation) Roma
12	GK	Gioele Zacchi	10 July 2003 (aged 21)	7	0	(Italian Football Federation) Latina
13	DF	**Michael Kayode**	10 July 2004 (aged 20)	7	0	(The Football Association) Brentford
14	MF	Giovanni Fabbian	14 January 2003 (aged 22)	16	4	(Italian Football Federation) Bologna
15	DF	**Diego Coppola**	28 December 2003 (aged 21)	10	0	(Italian Football Federation) Hellas Verona
16	DF	Riccardo Turicchia	5 February 2003 (aged 22)	10	0	(Italian Football Federation) Juventus
17	FW	**Luca Koleosho**	15 September 2004 (aged 20)	6	0	(The Football Association) Burnley
18	MF	**Issa Doumbia**	16 October 2003 (aged 21)	3	0	(Italian Football Federation) Venezia
19	DF	Gabriele Guarino	14 April 2004 (aged 21)	2	0	(Italian Football Federation) Carrarese
20	MF	**Niccolò Pisilli**	23 September 2004 (aged 20)	12	1	(Italian Football Federation) Roma
21	MF	Jacopo Fazzini	16 March 2003 (aged 22)	4	0	(Italian Football Federation) Empoli
22	GK	Jacopo Sassi	24 July 2003 (aged 21)	3	0	(Italian Football Federation) Modena
23	MF	Alessandro Bianco	1 October 2002 (aged 22)	7	1	(Italian Football Federation) Monza

=== Romania ===
Head coach: Daniel Pancu

The following 23 players were named in Romania's final squad.

No.	Pos.	Player	Date of birth (age)	Caps	Goals	Club
1	GK	Răzvan Sava	21 June 2002 (aged 22)	11	0	(Italian Football Federation) Udinese
2	DF	Dan Sîrbu	22 April 2003 (aged 22)	4	0	(Romanian Football Federation) Farul Constanța
3	DF	Cristian Ignat	29 January 2003 (aged 22)	12	0	(Romanian Football Federation) Rapid București
4	DF	Costin Amzăr	11 July 2003 (aged 21)	5	0	(United Arab Emirates Football Association) Al-Nasr
5	DF	Ümit Akdağ	6 October 2003 (aged 21)	7	1	(French Football Federation) Toulouse
6	DF	Matei Ilie	11 December 2002 (aged 22)	9	2	(Romanian Football Federation) CFR Cluj
7	MF	Ianis Stoica	8 December 2002 (aged 22)	15	3	(Romanian Football Federation) Hermannstadt
8	MF	**Constantin Grameni**	23 October 2002 (aged 22)	20	3	(Romanian Football Federation) Rapid București
9	FW	**Louis Munteanu**	16 June 2002 (aged 22)	17	5	(Romanian Football Federation) CFR Cluj
10	MF	**Octavian Popescu**	27 December 2002 (aged 22)	16	2	(Romanian Football Federation) FCSB
11	DF	**Andrei Borza**	12 November 2005 (aged 19)	11	2	(Romanian Football Federation) Rapid București
12	GK	Otto Hindrich	2 August 2002 (aged 22)	4	0	(Romanian Football Federation) CFR Cluj
13	DF	Matteo Duțu	23 November 2005 (aged 19)	3	0	(Italian Football Federation) Milan
14	MF	Zoran Mitrov	29 January 2002 (aged 23)	1	0	(Romanian Football Federation) Botoșani
15	MF	Cătălin Vulturar	9 March 2004 (aged 21)	9	1	(Romanian Football Federation) Rapid București
16	DF	Tony Strata	7 September 2004 (aged 20)	3	0	(French Football Federation) Ajaccio
17	MF	Marius Corbu	7 May 2002 (aged 23)	18	1	(Cyprus Football Association) APOEL
18	FW	Rareș Burnete	31 January 2004 (aged 21)	4	0	(Italian Football Federation) Lecce
19	MF	Rareș Ilie	19 April 2003 (aged 22)	12	3	(Italian Football Federation) Catanzaro
20	MF	Ovidiu Perianu	16 April 2002 (aged 23)	7	0	(Romanian Football Federation) Unirea Slobozia
21	MF	Cristian Mihai	23 September 2004 (aged 20)	4	2	(Romanian Football Federation) UTA Arad
22	FW	Vladislav Blănuță	12 January 2002 (aged 23)	6	0	(Romanian Football Federation) Universitatea Cluj
23	GK	Vlad Rafailă	17 February 2005 (aged 20)	1	0	(Italian Football Federation) Lecce

=== Slovakia ===
Slovakia named a provisional 25-man squad on 21 May 2025. Defender Sebastian Kóša and midfielder Dominik Veselovský dropped out of the squad on 4 June, when the other 23 players were confirmed to be going to the championship.

Head coach: Jaroslav Kentoš

No.	Pos.	Player	Date of birth (age)	Caps	Goals	Club
1	GK	Ľubomír Belko	4 February 2002 (aged 23)	17	0	(Slovak Football Association) Žilina
2	DF	Jakub Jakubko	24 August 2004 (aged 20)	12	0	(Slovak Football Association) Košice
3	DF	Filip Mielke	9 April 2005 (aged 20)	5	0	(Slovak Football Association) Železiarne Podbrezová
4	DF	**Adam Obert**	23 August 2002 (aged 22)	15	0	(Italian Football Federation) Cagliari
5	DF	Dominik Javorček	2 November 2002 (aged 22)	22	2	(German Football Association) Holstein Kiel
6	FW	**Dominik Hollý**	11 November 2003 (aged 21)	8	0	(Football Association of the Czech Republic) Jablonec
7	FW	**Tomáš Suslov**	7 June 2002 (aged 23)	4	1	(Italian Football Federation) Hellas Verona
8	MF	Martin Šviderský	4 October 2002 (aged 22)	23	0	(Royal Spanish Football Federation) Almería
9	FW	Roman Čerepkai	6 April 2002 (aged 23)	20	3	(Slovak Football Association) Košice
10	MF	Sebastian Nebyla	25 January 2002 (aged 23)	33	4	(Football Association of the Czech Republic) Jablonec
11	MF	Artur Gajdoš	20 January 2004 (aged 21)	15	5	(Slovak Football Association) Trenčín
12	GK	Adam Danko	27 June 2003 (aged 21)	3	0	(Slovak Football Association) Železiarne Podbrezová
13	DF	Nicolas Šikula	15 May 2003 (aged 22)	15	0	(Slovak Football Association) Dukla Banská Bystrica
14	MF	Mario Sauer	15 May 2004 (aged 21)	16	3	(Slovak Football Association) Žilina
15	MF	**Leo Sauer**	16 December 2005 (aged 19)	3	0	(Royal Dutch Football Association) NAC Breda
16	DF	Marek Ujlaky	3 December 2003 (aged 21)	6	1	(Slovak Football Association) Spartak Trnava
17	FW	**Adrián Kaprálik**	10 June 2002 (aged 23)	34	10	(Slovak Football Association) Žilina
18	FW	Nino Marcelli	29 May 2005 (aged 20)	15	6	(Slovak Football Association) Slovan Bratislava
19	FW	Timotej Jambor	4 April 2003 (aged 22)	14	4	(Slovak Football Association) Žilina
20	DF	Adam Gaži	1 March 2003 (aged 22)	5	0	(Slovak Football Association) Skalica
21	DF	Samuel Kopásek	22 May 2003 (aged 22)	11	0	(Slovak Football Association) Žilina
22	MF	**Tomáš Rigo**	3 July 2002 (aged 22)	10	1	(Football Association of the Czech Republic) Baník Ostrava
23	GK	Tomáš Frühwald	23 September 2002 (aged 22)	6	0	(Football Association of the Czech Republic) Bohemians

=== Spain ===
Spain named their final squad on 4 June 2025. On 8 June, Yeremay Hernández withdrew from the squad due to injury and was replace by Andrés García.

Head coach: Santi Denia

No.	Pos.	Player	Date of birth (age)	Caps	Goals	Club
1	GK	Alejandro Iturbe	2 September 2003 (aged 21)	11	0	(Royal Spanish Football Federation) Atlético Madrid
2	DF	**Marc Pubill**	20 June 2003 (aged 21)	8	1	(Royal Spanish Football Federation) Almería
3	DF	**Cristhian Mosquera**	27 June 2004 (aged 20)	10	1	(Royal Spanish Football Federation) Valencia
4	DF	Rafa Marín	19 May 2002 (aged 23)	12	0	(Italian Football Federation) Napoli
5	DF	César Tárrega	26 February 2002 (aged 23)	6	2	(Royal Spanish Football Federation) Valencia
6	MF	**Javi Guerra**	13 May 2003 (aged 22)	20	1	(Royal Spanish Football Federation) Valencia
7	FW	Diego López	13 May 2002 (aged 23)	19	2	(Royal Spanish Football Federation) Valencia
8	MF	**Beñat Turrientes**	31 January 2002 (aged 23)	28	5	(Royal Spanish Football Federation) Real Sociedad
9	FW	Mateo Joseph	19 October 2003 (aged 21)	12	8	(The Football Association) Leeds United
10	MF	Pablo Torre	3 April 2003 (aged 22)	20	2	(Royal Spanish Football Federation) Barcelona
11	FW	Raúl Moro	5 December 2002 (aged 22)	11	0	(Royal Spanish Football Federation) Valladolid
12	DF	Andrés García	7 February 2003 (aged 22)	3	0	(The Football Association) Aston Villa
13	GK	Aitor Fraga	12 March 2003 (aged 22)	2	0	(Royal Spanish Football Federation) Real Sociedad
14	MF	Mikel Jauregizar	13 November 2003 (aged 21)	7	1	(Royal Spanish Football Federation) Athletic Bilbao
15	DF	Juanma Herzog	13 May 2004 (aged 21)	4	0	(Royal Spanish Football Federation) Las Palmas
16	DF	Juanlu Sánchez	15 August 2003 (aged 21)	12	0	(Royal Spanish Football Federation) Sevilla
17	FW	**Jesús Rodríguez**	21 November 2005 (aged 19)	5	1	(Royal Spanish Football Federation) Real Betis
18	DF	Gerard Martín	26 February 2002 (aged 23)	3	0	(Royal Spanish Football Federation) Barcelona
19	FW	Roberto Fernández	3 July 2002 (aged 22)	5	2	(Royal Spanish Football Federation) Espanyol
20	MF	Alberto Moleiro	30 September 2003 (aged 21)	13	0	(Royal Spanish Football Federation) Las Palmas
21	MF	Pablo Marín	3 July 2003 (aged 21)	2	0	(Royal Spanish Football Federation) Real Sociedad
22	DF	Hugo Bueno	18 September 2002 (aged 22)	7	0	(Royal Dutch Football Association) Feyenoord
23	GK	Pablo Cuñat	28 April 2002 (aged 23)	8	0	(Royal Spanish Football Federation) Cartagena

== Group B ==
=== Czech Republic ===
Head coach: Jan Suchopárek

The Czech Republic named their final squad on 5 June 2025. Matěj Šín was injured on 7 June and was replaced by Albert Labík. UEFA published the squad numbers before the tournament.

No.	Pos.	Player	Date of birth (age)	Caps	Goals	Club
1	GK	Jiří Borek	23 September 2002 (aged 22)	1	0	(Football Association of the Czech Republic) Slovácko
2	MF	Jan Paluska	23 June 2005 (aged 19)	0	0	(Football Association of the Czech Republic) Viktoria Plzeň
3	MF	Ondřej Kričfaluši	9 March 2004 (aged 21)	8	0	(Football Association of the Czech Republic) Teplice
4	DF	Martin Suchomel	11 September 2002 (aged 22)	12	0	(Football Association of the Czech Republic) Sparta Prague
5	DF	**Štěpán Chaloupek**	8 March 2003 (aged 22)	10	0	(Football Association of the Czech Republic) Slavia Prague
6	MF	Patrik Vydra	20 June 2003 (aged 21)	16	0	(Football Association of the Czech Republic) Sparta Prague
7	FW	Daniel Fila	21 August 2002 (aged 22)	20	10	(Italian Football Federation) Venezia
8	DF	Denis Halinský	13 July 2003 (aged 21)	6	1	(Football Association of the Czech Republic) Slovan Liberec
9	FW	**Václav Sejk**	18 May 2002 (aged 23)	33	12	(Portuguese Football Federation) Famalicão
10	MF	**Adam Karabec**	2 July 2003 (aged 21)	27	5	(German Football Association) Hamburger SV
11	MF	Albert Labík	13 May 2004 (aged 21)	4	0	(Football Association of the Czech Republic) Teplice
12	MF	**Alexandr Sojka**	2 April 2003 (aged 22)	4	0	(Football Association of the Czech Republic) Viktoria Plzeň
13	MF	**Kryštof Daněk**	5 January 2003 (aged 22)	21	3	(Austrian Football Association) LASK
14	MF	Vojtěch Stránský	13 March 2003 (aged 22)	2	0	(Football Association of the Czech Republic) Mladá Boleslav
15	MF	**Denis Višinský**	21 March 2003 (aged 22)	7	0	(Football Association of the Czech Republic) Slovan Liberec
16	GK	**Lukáš Horníček**	13 July 2002 (aged 22)	10	0	(Portuguese Football Federation) Braga
17	MF	Daniel Langhamer	20 March 2003 (aged 22)	8	0	(Football Association of the Czech Republic) Teplice
18	DF	Filip Prebsl	4 March 2003 (aged 22)	13	0	(Polish Football Association) Górnik Zabrze
19	DF	Karel Spáčil	18 May 2003 (aged 22)	6	0	(Football Association of the Czech Republic) Hradec Králové
20	DF	Josef Koželuh	15 February 2002 (aged 23)	8	0	(Football Association of the Czech Republic) Slovan Liberec
21	FW	Filip Vecheta	15 February 2003 (aged 22)	9	0	(Football Association of the Czech Republic) Karviná
22	DF	Matěj Hadaš	25 November 2003 (aged 21)	3	0	(Football Association of the Czech Republic) Sigma Olomouc
23	GK	Jan Koutný	14 October 2004 (aged 20)	0	0	(Football Association of the Czech Republic) Sigma Olomouc

=== England ===
Head coach: (Republic of Ireland) Lee Carsley

The following 23 players were named in England's final squad on 6 June 2025. On 11 June, Jobe Bellingham withdrew from the squad and was replaced by Tom Fellows.

No.	Pos.	Player	Date of birth (age)	Caps	Goals	Club
1	GK	James Beadle	16 July 2004 (aged 20)	9	0	(The Football Association) Brighton & Hove Albion
2	DF	**Tino Livramento**	12 November 2002 (aged 22)	11	0	(The Football Association) Newcastle United
3	DF	Ronnie Edwards	28 March 2003 (aged 22)	2	0	(The Football Association) Southampton
4	DF	**Jarell Quansah**	29 January 2003 (aged 22)	11	0	(The Football Association) Liverpool
5	DF	Charlie Cresswell	17 August 2002 (aged 22)	23	3	(French Football Federation) Toulouse
6	MF	Hayden Hackney	26 June 2002 (aged 22)	11	1	(The Football Association) Middlesbrough
7	FW	Tom Fellows	25 July 2003 (aged 21)	3	1	(The Football Association) West Bromwich Albion
8	MF	**Elliot Anderson**	6 November 2002 (aged 22)	9	1	(The Football Association) Nottingham Forest
9	FW	Jonathan Rowe	30 April 2003 (aged 22)	7	2	(French Football Federation) Marseille
10	MF	James McAtee	18 October 2002 (aged 22)	21	7	(The Football Association) Manchester City
11	FW	Omari Hutchinson	30 October 2003 (aged 21)	7	2	(The Football Association) Ipswich Town
12	DF	Brooke Norton-Cuffy	12 January 2004 (aged 21)	6	0	(Italian Football Federation) Genoa
13	GK	Tommy Simkin	8 December 2004 (aged 20)	0	0	(The Football Association) Stoke City
14	MF	Archie Gray	12 March 2006 (aged 19)	12	1	(The Football Association) Tottenham Hotspur
15	DF	CJ Egan-Riley	2 January 2003 (aged 22)	2	0	(The Football Association) Burnley
16	MF	Jack Hinshelwood	11 April 2005 (aged 20)	7	0	(The Football Association) Brighton & Hove Albion
17	FW	Samuel Iling-Junior	4 October 2003 (aged 21)	15	2	(The Football Association) Aston Villa
18	FW	Jay Stansfield	24 November 2002 (aged 22)	6	0	(The Football Association) Birmingham City
19	FW	Harvey Elliott	4 April 2003 (aged 22)	25	10	(The Football Association) Liverpool
20	MF	**Alex Scott**	21 August 2003 (aged 21)	8	1	(The Football Association) Bournemouth
21	FW	Ethan Nwaneri	21 March 2007 (aged 18)	5	1	(The Football Association) Arsenal
22	GK	Teddy Sharman-Lowe	30 March 2003 (aged 22)	1	0	(The Football Association) Chelsea
23	MF	Tyler Morton	31 October 2002 (aged 22)	11	1	(The Football Association) Liverpool

=== Germany ===
Head coach: Antonio Di Salvo

The following 23 players were named in Germany's final squad.

No.	Pos.	Player	Date of birth (age)	Caps	Goals	Club
1	GK	Noah Atubolu	25 May 2002 (aged 23)	19	0	(German Football Association) SC Freiburg
2	DF	**Nnamdi Collins**	10 January 2004 (aged 21)	7	0	(German Football Association) Eintracht Frankfurt
3	DF	**Nathaniel Brown**	16 June 2003 (aged 21)	11	1	(German Football Association) Eintracht Frankfurt
4	DF	Bright Arrey-Mbi	26 March 2003 (aged 22)	14	1	(Portuguese Football Federation) Braga
5	DF	Max Rosenfelder	10 February 2003 (aged 22)	9	1	(German Football Association) SC Freiburg
6	MF	Eric Martel	29 April 2002 (aged 23)	27	2	(German Football Association) 1. FC Köln
7	MF	Ansgar Knauff	10 January 2002 (aged 23)	27	4	(German Football Association) Eintracht Frankfurt
8	MF	Merlin Röhl	5 July 2002 (aged 22)	10	2	(German Football Association) SC Freiburg
9	FW	Nicolò Tresoldi	20 August 2004 (aged 20)	14	6	(German Football Association) Hannover 96
10	FW	**Nick Woltemade**	14 February 2002 (aged 23)	15	11	(German Football Association) VfB Stuttgart
11	MF	Jan Thielmann	26 May 2002 (aged 23)	20	1	(German Football Association) 1. FC Köln
12	GK	Tjark Ernst	15 March 2003 (aged 22)	2	0	(German Football Association) Hertha BSC
13	DF	Lukas Ullrich	16 March 2004 (aged 21)	3	0	(German Football Association) Borussia Mönchengladbach
14	DF	Tim Oermann	6 October 2003 (aged 21)	7	0	(German Football Association) VfL Bochum
15	DF	Jamil Siebert	2 April 2002 (aged 23)	7	0	(German Football Association) Fortuna Düsseldorf
16	MF	Caspar Jander	23 March 2003 (aged 22)	3	0	(German Football Association) 1. FC Nürnberg
17	MF	Brajan Gruda	31 May 2004 (aged 21)	14	2	(The Football Association) Brighton & Hove Albion
18	MF	Rocco Reitz	29 May 2002 (aged 23)	14	2	(German Football Association) Borussia Mönchengladbach
19	FW	Nelson Weiper	17 March 2005 (aged 20)	8	1	(German Football Association) Mainz 05
20	MF	Paul Nebel	10 October 2002 (aged 22)	11	1	(German Football Association) Mainz 05
21	DF	Elias Baum	26 October 2005 (aged 19)	1	0	(German Football Association) SV Elversberg
22	MF	**Paul Wanner**	23 December 2005 (aged 19)	5	1	(German Football Association) 1. FC Heidenheim
23	GK	Nahuel Noll	17 March 2003 (aged 22)	0	0	(German Football Association) Greuther Fürth

=== Slovenia ===
Head coach: Andrej Razdrh

The following 23 players were named in Slovenia's final squad.

No.	Pos.	Player	Date of birth (age)	Caps	Goals	Club
1	GK	Martin Turk	21 August 2003 (aged 21)	23	0	(Polish Football Association) Ruch Chorzów
2	DF	**Mitja Ilenič**	26 December 2004 (aged 20)	14	0	(United States Soccer Federation) New York City FC
3	DF	**Srđan Kuzmić**	16 January 2004 (aged 21)	13	0	(Danish Football Association) Viborg
4	DF	Relja Obrić	11 April 2006 (aged 19)	0	0	(Italian Football Federation) Atalanta
5	DF	Lovro Golič	5 March 2006 (aged 19)	0	0	(Italian Football Federation) Roma
6	MF	Žan Jevšenak	15 May 2003 (aged 22)	16	0	(Portuguese Football Federation) Oliveirense
7	FW	Tjaš Begić	30 June 2003 (aged 21)	16	3	(Italian Football Federation) Frosinone
8	MF	**Adrian Zeljković**	19 August 2002 (aged 22)	13	2	(Slovak Football Association) Spartak Trnava
9	MF	Tio Cipot	20 April 2003 (aged 22)	16	8	(Austrian Football Association) Grazer AK
10	MF	**Svit Sešlar**	9 January 2002 (aged 23)	18	1	(Football Association of Slovenia) Celje
11	FW	Dino Kojić	4 April 2005 (aged 20)	5	0	(Football Association of Slovenia) Olimpija Ljubljana
12	GK	Žan-Luk Leban	15 December 2002 (aged 22)	5	0	(The Football Association) Everton
13	MF	Edvin Krupić	3 March 2004 (aged 21)	1	0	(Football Association of Slovenia) Domžale
14	MF	Marcel Lorber	26 April 2004 (aged 21)	1	0	(Football Association of Slovenia) Domžale
15	MF	Sandro Jovanović	23 April 2002 (aged 23)	3	0	(Football Association of Slovenia) Koper
16	MF	Luka Topalović	23 February 2006 (aged 19)	0	0	(Italian Football Federation) Inter Milan
17	MF	Martin Pečar	5 July 2002 (aged 22)	11	0	(Football Association of Slovenia) Bravo
18	MF	Marko Brest	10 May 2002 (aged 23)	14	0	(Football Association of Slovenia) Olimpija Ljubljana
19	MF	Enrik Ostrc	21 June 2002 (aged 22)	15	0	(Royal Dutch Football Association) Helmond Sport
20	MF	Jošt Pišek	10 March 2002 (aged 23)	12	1	(Football Association of Slovenia) Mura
21	FW	Jaka Čuber Potočnik	17 June 2005 (aged 19)	2	0	(German Football Association) 1. FC Köln
22	GK	Lovro Štubljar	9 August 2004 (aged 20)	1	0	(Football Association of Slovenia) Domžale
23	DF	Nino Milić	1 May 2004 (aged 21)	5	0	(Football Association of Slovenia) Domžale

== Group C ==
=== France ===
Head coach: Gérald Baticle

The following 23 players were named in France's final squad. On 16 June, Robin Risser withdrew from the squad due to injury and was replace by Justin Bengui.

No.	Pos.	Player	Date of birth (age)	Caps	Goals	Club
1	GK	Obed Nkambadio	7 February 2003 (aged 22)	3	0	(French Football Federation) Paris FC
2	DF	**Castello Lukeba**	17 December 2002 (aged 22)	25	0	(German Football Association) RB Leipzig
3	DF	Quentin Merlin	16 May 2002 (aged 23)	17	1	(French Football Federation) Marseille
4	DF	Chrislain Matsima	15 May 2002 (aged 23)	12	1	(German Football Association) FC Augsburg
5	DF	Kiliann Sildillia	16 May 2002 (aged 23)	15	0	(German Football Association) SC Freiburg
6	MF	Lucien Agoumé	9 February 2002 (aged 23)	12	0	(Royal Spanish Football Federation) Sevilla
7	FW	Mathys Tel	27 April 2005 (aged 20)	13	6	(The Football Association) Tottenham Hotspur
8	MF	Johann Lepenant	22 October 2002 (aged 22)	14	2	(French Football Federation) Nantes
9	FW	Matthis Abline	28 March 2003 (aged 22)	8	2	(French Football Federation) Nantes
10	FW	Wilson Odobert	28 November 2004 (aged 20)	9	1	(The Football Association) Tottenham Hotspur
11	FW	Loum Tchaouna	8 September 2003 (aged 21)	9	1	(Italian Football Federation) Lazio
12	FW	Noah Edjouma	4 October 2005 (aged 19)	2	0	(French Football Federation) Toulouse
13	FW	Jean-Mattéo Bahoya	7 May 2005 (aged 20)	2	1	(German Football Association) Eintracht Frankfurt
14	DF	Christian Mawissa	8 April 2005 (aged 20)	4	0	(French Football Federation) Monaco (Note: Monaco is a Monégasque club playing in the French football league system.)
15	DF	Nathan Zézé	18 June 2005 (aged 19)	3	1	(French Football Federation) Nantes
16	GK	Guillaume Restes	11 March 2005 (aged 20)	14	0	(French Football Federation) Toulouse
17	MF	Soungoutou Magassa	8 October 2003 (aged 21)	6	0	(French Football Federation) Monaco
18	MF	Djaoui Cissé	31 January 2004 (aged 21)	3	2	(French Football Federation) Rennes
19	DF	Ismaël Doukouré	24 July 2003 (aged 21)	11	0	(French Football Federation) Strasbourg
20	MF	Andy Diouf	17 May 2003 (aged 22)	9	0	(French Football Federation) Lens
21	MF	Félix Lemaréchal	7 August 2003 (aged 21)	3	0	(French Football Federation) Strasbourg
22	FW	Thierno Barry	21 October 2002 (aged 22)	6	1	(Royal Spanish Football Federation) Villarreal
23	GK	Justin Bengui	9 July 2005 (aged 19)	0	0	(French Football Federation) Lyon

=== Georgia ===
Head coach: Ramaz Svanadze

The following 23 players were named in Georgia's final squad.

No.	Pos.	Player	Date of birth (age)	Caps	Goals	Club
1	GK	Mikheil Makatsaria	11 June 2004 (aged 21)	2	0	(Georgian Football Federation) Dinamo Tbilisi
2	DF	Lado Odishvili	28 May 2003 (aged 22)	4	0	(Georgian Football Federation) Telavi
3	DF	Irakli Iakobidze	15 January 2002 (aged 23)	2	1	(Georgian Football Federation) Dinamo Tbilisi
4	DF	**Saba Khvadagiani**	30 January 2003 (aged 22)	28	3	(Georgian Football Federation) Dinamo Tbilisi
5	MF	Levan Osikmashvili	20 April 2002 (aged 23)	13	0	(Israel Football Association) Hapoel Hadera
6	MF	Nodar Lominadze	4 April 2002 (aged 23)	18	3	(Georgian Football Federation) Dinamo Tbilisi
7	FW	Lasha Odisharia	23 October 2002 (aged 22)	17	1	(Latvian Football Federation) RFS
8	MF	Otar Mamageishvili	15 January 2003 (aged 22)	21	3	(Portuguese Football Federation) Famalicão
9	FW	Giorgi Kvernadze	7 February 2003 (aged 22)	21	2	(Italian Football Federation) Frosinone
10	MF	**Luka Gagnidze**	28 February 2003 (aged 22)	22	1	(Russian Football Union) Krylia Sovetov
11	FW	Gizo Mamageishvili	15 January 2003 (aged 22)	12	2	(Georgian Football Federation) Iberia 1999
12	GK	Levan Tandilashvili	27 February 2003 (aged 22)	2	0	(Georgian Football Federation) Telavi
13	DF	Saba Mamatsashvili	23 August 2002 (aged 22)	15	1	(Swedish Football Association) Sirius
14	FW	Vakho Bedoshvili	19 October 2003 (aged 21)	1	0	(Georgian Football Federation) Gareji
15	DF	**Saba Sazonov**	1 February 2002 (aged 23)	10	1	(Italian Football Federation) Empoli
16	DF	**Irakli Azarovi**	21 February 2002 (aged 23)	12	0	(Ukrainian Association of Football) Shakhtar Donetsk
17	MF	**Gabriel Sigua**	30 June 2005 (aged 19)	10	1	(Swiss Football Association) Basel
18	DF	Giorgi Maisuradze	31 January 2002 (aged 23)	16	0	(Ukrainian Association of Football) Polissya Zhytomyr
19	MF	Tornike Morchiladze	10 January 2002 (aged 23)	9	1	(Georgian Football Federation) Dinamo Tbilisi
20	FW	Giorgi Abuashvili	8 February 2003 (aged 22)	16	2	(Georgian Football Federation) Kolkheti 1913
21	MF	Irakli Yegoian	19 March 2004 (aged 21)	10	0	(Royal Dutch Football Association) Vitesse
22	FW	Vasilios Gordeziani	29 January 2002 (aged 23)	12	2	(Football Association of Bosnia and Herzegovina) Sarajevo
23	GK	Luka Kharatishvili	13 January 2003 (aged 22)	15	0	(Georgian Football Federation) Dinamo Batumi

=== Poland ===
Head coach: Adam Majewski

The following 23 players were named in Poland's final squad.

No.	Pos.	Player	Date of birth (age)	Caps	Goals	Club
1	GK	Kacper Tobiasz	4 November 2002 (aged 22)	14	0	(Polish Football Association) Legia Warsaw
2	DF	Ariel Mosór	19 February 2003 (aged 22)	22	2	(Polish Football Association) Raków Częstochowa
3	DF	**Patryk Peda**	16 April 2002 (aged 23)	18	0	(Italian Football Federation) Juve Stabia
4	DF	Miłosz Matysik	26 April 2004 (aged 21)	10	1	(Cyprus Football Association) Aris Limassol
5	DF	Łukasz Bejger	11 January 2002 (aged 23)	17	2	(Football Association of Slovenia) Celje
6	MF	**Mateusz Łęgowski**	29 January 2003 (aged 22)	19	0	(Swiss Football Association) Yverdon-Sport
7	MF	Kajetan Szmyt	29 May 2002 (aged 23)	18	3	(Polish Football Association) Zagłębie Lubin
8	MF	**Jakub Kałuziński**	31 October 2002 (aged 22)	18	4	(Turkish Football Federation) Antalyaspor
9	FW	Filip Szymczak	6 May 2002 (aged 23)	25	8	(Polish Football Association) GKS Katowice
10	MF	**Kacper Kozłowski**	16 October 2003 (aged 21)	16	3	(Turkish Football Federation) Gaziantep
11	MF	Michał Rakoczy	30 March 2002 (aged 23)	19	3	(Turkish Football Federation) Ankaragücü
12	GK	Kacper Trelowski	19 August 2003 (aged 21)	2	0	(Polish Football Association) Raków Częstochowa
13	DF	Filip Luberecki	25 April 2005 (aged 20)	2	0	(Polish Football Association) Motor Lublin
14	DF	Arkadiusz Pyrka	20 September 2002 (aged 22)	17	1	(Polish Football Association) Piast Gliwice
15	DF	Michał Gurgul	30 January 2006 (aged 19)	0	0	(Polish Football Association) Lech Poznań
16	MF	**Antoni Kozubal**	18 August 2004 (aged 20)	7	0	(Polish Football Association) Lech Poznań
17	MF	Mariusz Fornalczyk	15 January 2003 (aged 22)	7	2	(Polish Football Association) Korona Kielce
18	FW	**Dominik Marczuk**	1 November 2003 (aged 21)	9	2	(United States Soccer Federation) Real Salt Lake
19	MF	Mateusz Kowalczyk	16 April 2004 (aged 21)	2	0	(Polish Football Association) GKS Katowice
20	FW	Wiktor Bogacz	14 July 2004 (aged 20)	0	0	(United States Soccer Federation) New York Red Bulls
21	MF	Tomasz Pieńko	5 January 2004 (aged 21)	14	3	(Polish Football Association) Zagłębie Lubin
22	GK	Sławomir Abramowicz	9 June 2004 (aged 21)	1	0	(Polish Football Association) Jagiellonia Białystok
23	DF	Bartłomiej Smolarczyk	2 July 2003 (aged 21)	4	0	(Polish Football Association) Korona Kielce

=== Portugal ===
Head coach: Rui Jorge

The following 23 players were named in Portugal's final squad.

No.	Pos.	Player	Date of birth (age)	Caps	Goals	Club
1	GK	Samuel Soares	15 June 2002 (aged 22)	13	0	(Portuguese Football Federation) Benfica
2	DF	Rodrigo Pinheiro	28 August 2002 (aged 22)	3	0	(Portuguese Football Federation) Famalicão
3	DF	João Muniz	26 June 2005 (aged 19)	4	0	(Portuguese Football Federation) Sporting CP
4	DF	Chico Lamba	10 March 2003 (aged 22)	1	0	(Portuguese Football Federation) Arouca
5	DF	Rafael Rodrigues	27 January 2002 (aged 23)	12	1	(Portuguese Football Federation) AVS
6	MF	Diogo Nascimento	2 November 2002 (aged 22)	2	0	(Portuguese Football Federation) Vizela
7	MF	Mateus Fernandes	10 July 2004 (aged 20)	13	3	(The Football Association) Southampton
8	MF	Paulo Bernardo	24 January 2002 (aged 23)	28	10	(Scottish Football Association) Celtic
9	FW	Henrique Araújo	19 January 2002 (aged 23)	29	11	(Portuguese Football Federation) Arouca
10	MF	Pedro Santos	10 February 2003 (aged 22)	11	3	(Portuguese Football Federation) Moreirense
11	FW	Tiago Tomás	16 June 2002 (aged 22)	21	2	(German Football Association) VfL Wolfsburg
12	GK	João Carvalho	9 April 2004 (aged 21)	6	0	(Portuguese Football Federation) Braga
13	DF	Flávio Nazinho	20 July 2003 (aged 21)	4	0	(Royal Belgian Football Association) Cercle Brugge
14	DF	Christian Marques	15 January 2003 (aged 22)	4	0	(Swiss Football Association) Yverdon-Sport
15	DF	Lourenço Henriques	11 March 2004 (aged 21)	0	0	(Portuguese Football Federation) Varzim
16	MF	Mathias De Amorim	10 December 2004 (aged 20)	0	0	(Portuguese Football Federation) Famalicão
17	FW	Geovany Quenda	30 April 2007 (aged 18)	3	0	(Portuguese Football Federation) Sporting CP
18	MF	Gustavo Sá	11 November 2004 (aged 20)	6	0	(Portuguese Football Federation) Famalicão
19	MF	João Marques	13 February 2002 (aged 23)	10	1	(Portuguese Football Federation) Gil Vicente
20	FW	Carlos Forbs	19 March 2004 (aged 21)	11	4	(The Football Association) Wolverhampton Wanderers
21	FW	Roger Fernandes	21 November 2005 (aged 19)	0	0	(Portuguese Football Federation) Braga
22	GK	Diogo Pinto	18 June 2004 (aged 20)	1	0	(Portuguese Football Federation) Sporting CP
23	DF	Rodrigo Gomes	7 July 2003 (aged 21)	11	3	(The Football Association) Wolverhampton Wanderers

== Group D ==
=== Denmark ===
Head coach: Steffen Højer

The following 23 players were named in Denmark's final squad.

No.	Pos.	Player	Date of birth (age)	Caps	Goals	Club
1	GK	Andreas Jungdal	22 February 2002 (aged 23)	15	0	(Royal Belgian Football Association) Westerlo
2	DF	**Anton Gaaei**	19 November 2002 (aged 22)	20	0	(Royal Dutch Football Association) Ajax
3	DF	Thomas Kristensen	17 January 2002 (aged 23)	17	1	(Italian Football Federation) Udinese
4	DF	**Oliver Provstgaard**	4 June 2003 (aged 22)	23	3	(Italian Football Federation) Lazio
5	MF	Tochi Chukwuani	24 March 2003 (aged 22)	19	2	(Austrian Football Association) Sturm Graz
6	MF	Oliver Sørensen	10 March 2002 (aged 23)	14	5	(Danish Football Association) Midtjylland
7	MF	Isak Jensen	23 December 2003 (aged 21)	9	1	(Danish Football Association) Viborg
8	MF	William Bøving	1 March 2003 (aged 22)	21	3	(Austrian Football Association) Sturm Graz
9	FW	**William Osula**	4 August 2003 (aged 21)	14	8	(The Football Association) Newcastle United
10	FW	**Conrad Harder**	7 April 2005 (aged 20)	6	2	(Portuguese Football Federation) Sporting CP
11	FW	**Mathias Kvistgaarden**	15 April 2002 (aged 23)	23	7	(Danish Football Association) Brøndby
12	MF	Thomas Jørgensen	30 September 2005 (aged 19)	5	1	(Danish Football Association) Viborg
13	DF	Victor Bak Jensen	3 October 2003 (aged 21)	7	0	(Danish Football Association) Midtjylland
14	DF	Lucas Hey	13 April 2003 (aged 22)	16	0	(Royal Belgian Football Association) Anderlecht
15	MF	Oscar Højlund	4 January 2005 (aged 20)	1	0	(German Football Association) Eintracht Frankfurt
16	GK	William Lykke	28 September 2004 (aged 20)	1	0	(Danish Football Association) Nordsjælland
17	MF	Noah Nartey	5 October 2005 (aged 19)	5	0	(Danish Football Association) Brøndby
18	MF	Oscar Fraulo	6 December 2003 (aged 21)	22	0	(Royal Dutch Football Association) Utrecht
19	DF	**Elias Jelert**	12 June 2003 (aged 21)	14	0	(Turkish Football Federation) Galatasaray
20	MF	Clement Bischoff	16 December 2005 (aged 19)	6	1	(Danish Football Association) Brøndby
21	DF	Sebastian Otoa	13 May 2004 (aged 21)	2	0	(Italian Football Federation) Genoa
22	GK	Theo Sander	8 January 2005 (aged 20)	0	0	(Danish Football Association) Copenhagen
23	DF	Aske Adelgaard	10 November 2003 (aged 21)	12	1	(Royal Dutch Football Association) Go Ahead Eagles

=== Finland ===
Head coach: Mika Lehkosuo

The following 23 players were named in Finland's final squad.

No.	Pos.	Player	Date of birth (age)	Caps	Goals	Club
1	GK	**Lucas Bergström**	5 September 2002 (aged 22)	16	0	(The Football Association) Chelsea
2	DF	Rony Jansson	10 January 2004 (aged 21)	9	0	(Swedish Football Association) Kalmar
3	DF	**Tomas Galvez**	28 January 2005 (aged 20)	10	1	(Royal Dutch Football Association) Cambuur
4	MF	**Matti Peltola**	3 July 2002 (aged 22)	5	1	(United States Soccer Federation) D.C. United
5	DF	Samuli Miettinen	16 June 2004 (aged 20)	3	0	(Football Association of Finland) KuPS
6	MF	**Santeri Väänänen**	1 January 2002 (aged 23)	21	1	(Norwegian Football Federation) Rosenborg
7	MF	Naatan Skyttä	7 May 2002 (aged 23)	26	11	(French Football Federation) Dunkerque
8	MF	Adam Markhiyev	17 March 2002 (aged 23)	23	0	(Cyprus Football Association) Aris Limassol
9	FW	Teemu Hytönen	15 August 2002 (aged 22)	4	0	(Football Association of Finland) Ilves
10	MF	Doni Arifi	11 April 2002 (aged 23)	6	0	(Football Association of Finland) Ilves
11	FW	**Casper Terho**	24 June 2003 (aged 21)	21	4	(German Football Association) SC Paderborn
12	GK	**Elmo Henriksson**	10 March 2003 (aged 22)	3	0	(Royal Spanish Football Federation) Sporting Gijón
13	MF	Niklas Pyyhtiä	25 September 2003 (aged 21)	18	1	(Italian Football Federation) Südtirol
14	DF	Kalle Wallius	2 January 2003 (aged 22)	18	0	(Football Association of Finland) Ilves
15	MF	Luka Hyryläinen	25 August 2004 (aged 20)	10	1	(German Football Association) SSV Ulm
16	DF	Dario Naamo	14 May 2005 (aged 20)	7	0	(Austrian Football Association) St. Pölten
17	FW	**Juho Talvitie**	25 March 2005 (aged 20)	16	3	(Royal Dutch Football Association) Heracles Almelo
18	FW	**Topi Keskinen**	7 March 2003 (aged 22)	12	2	(Scottish Football Association) Aberdeen
19	FW	Oiva Jukkola	21 May 2002 (aged 23)	6	2	(Football Association of Finland) Ilves
20	MF	Otso Liimatta	10 July 2004 (aged 20)	19	8	(Portuguese Football Federation) Famalicão
21	DF	**Ville Koski**	27 January 2002 (aged 23)	29	1	(Croatian Football Federation) Istra
22	DF	**Miska Ylitolva**	23 May 2004 (aged 21)	15	1	(Football Association of Finland) HJK
23	GK	Roope Paunio	14 December 2002 (aged 22)	1	0	(Football Association of Finland) SJK

=== Netherlands ===
Head coach: Michael Reiziger

The following 23 players were named in the Netherlands' final squad. On 8 June, Rome-Jayden Owusu-Oduro withdrew due to injury and was replace by Dani van den Heuvel.

No.	Pos.	Player	Date of birth (age)	Caps	Goals	Club
1	GK	Dani van den Heuvel	28 May 2003 (aged 22)	2	0	(Royal Belgian Football Association) Club Brugge
2	DF	**Devyne Rensch**	18 January 2003 (aged 22)	21	3	(Italian Football Federation) Roma
3	DF	Ryan Flamingo	31 December 2002 (aged 22)	15	0	(Royal Dutch Football Association) PSV Eindhoven
4	DF	**Jorrel Hato**	7 March 2006 (aged 19)	9	0	(Royal Dutch Football Association) Ajax
5	DF	**Ian Maatsen**	10 March 2002 (aged 23)	22	1	(The Football Association) Aston Villa
6	MF	Youri Regeer	18 August 2003 (aged 21)	16	2	(Royal Dutch Football Association) Ajax
7	FW	Million Manhoef	3 January 2002 (aged 23)	23	7	(The Football Association) Stoke City
8	DF	**Anass Salah-Eddine**	18 January 2002 (aged 23)	13	0	(Italian Football Federation) Roma
9	FW	Noah Ohio	16 January 2003 (aged 22)	20	8	(Royal Dutch Football Association) Utrecht
10	MF	**Kenneth Taylor**	16 May 2002 (aged 23)	26	3	(Royal Dutch Football Association) Ajax
11	FW	Ruben van Bommel	3 August 2004 (aged 20)	15	4	(Royal Dutch Football Association) AZ
12	DF	Neraysho Kasanwirjo	18 February 2002 (aged 23)	12	0	(Scottish Football Association) Rangers
13	DF	Rav van den Berg	7 July 2004 (aged 20)	6	1	(The Football Association) Middlesbrough
14	DF	Wouter Goes	10 June 2004 (aged 21)	5	0	(Royal Dutch Football Association) AZ
15	DF	Bjorn Meijer	18 March 2003 (aged 22)	11	2	(Royal Belgian Football Association) Club Brugge
16	GK	Robin Roefs	17 January 2003 (aged 22)	8	0	(Royal Dutch Football Association) NEC
17	FW	Ernest Poku	28 January 2004 (aged 21)	12	1	(Royal Dutch Football Association) AZ
18	MF	Ezechiel Banzuzi	16 February 2005 (aged 20)	6	1	(Royal Belgian Football Association) OH Leuven
19	FW	Thom van Bergen	6 January 2004 (aged 21)	8	3	(Royal Dutch Football Association) Groningen
20	MF	Antoni Milambo	3 April 2005 (aged 20)	5	0	(Royal Dutch Football Association) Feyenoord
21	FW	Myron van Brederode	6 July 2003 (aged 21)	17	1	(German Football Association) Fortuna Düsseldorf
22	MF	**Luciano Valente**	4 October 2003 (aged 21)	6	4	(Royal Dutch Football Association) Groningen
23	GK	Calvin Raatsie	9 February 2002 (aged 23)	7	0	(Royal Dutch Football Association) Excelsior

=== Ukraine ===
Head coach: (Spain) Unai Melgosa

The following 23 players were named in Ukraine's final squad.

No.	Pos.	Player	Date of birth (age)	Caps	Goals	Club
1	GK	Ruslan Neshcheret	22 January 2002 (aged 23)	25	0	(Ukrainian Association of Football) Dynamo Kyiv
2	DF	Kostyantyn Vivcharenko	10 June 2002 (aged 23)	30	2	(Ukrainian Association of Football) Dynamo Kyiv
3	DF	Illya Krupskyi	2 October 2004 (aged 20)	9	0	(Ukrainian Association of Football) Vorskla Poltava
4	DF	Taras Mykhavko	30 May 2005 (aged 20)	4	1	(Ukrainian Association of Football) Dynamo Kyiv
5	DF	Artem Smolyakov	29 May 2003 (aged 22)	9	0	(United States Soccer Federation) Los Angeles FC
6	MF	**Volodymyr Brazhko**	23 January 2002 (aged 23)	24	2	(Ukrainian Association of Football) Dynamo Kyiv
7	FW	Illya Kvasnytsya	20 March 2003 (aged 22)	15	4	(Ukrainian Association of Football) Karpaty Lviv
8	MF	Oleh Ocheretko	25 May 2003 (aged 22)	26	4	(Ukrainian Association of Football) Karpaty Lviv
9	MF	Nazar Voloshyn	17 June 2003 (aged 21)	13	4	(Ukrainian Association of Football) Dynamo Kyiv
10	FW	Bohdan Viunnyk	21 May 2002 (aged 23)	33	8	(Polish Football Association) Lechia Gdańsk
11	FW	**Vladyslav Vanat**	4 January 2002 (aged 23)	13	4	(Ukrainian Association of Football) Dynamo Kyiv
12	GK	Heorhiy Yermakov	28 March 2002 (aged 23)	3	0	(Ukrainian Association of Football) Oleksandriya
13	DF	Volodymyr Salyuk	25 June 2002 (aged 22)	15	0	(Ukrainian Association of Football) Metalist 1925 Kharkiv
14	DF	Eduard Kozik	19 April 2003 (aged 22)	5	0	(Ukrainian Association of Football) Kolos Kovalivka
15	DF	Vitaliy Roman	15 April 2003 (aged 22)	15	1	(Ukrainian Association of Football) Rukh Lviv
16	DF	Arseniy Batahov	5 March 2002 (aged 23)	36	3	(Turkish Football Federation) Trabzonspor
17	MF	**Yehor Yarmolyuk**	1 March 2004 (aged 21)	14	1	(The Football Association) Brentford
18	MF	Oleksandr Yatsyk	3 January 2003 (aged 22)	9	1	(Ukrainian Association of Football) Zorya Luhansk
19	MF	Anton Tsarenko	17 June 2004 (aged 20)	5	0	(Polish Football Association) Lechia Gdańsk
20	MF	Vladyslav Veleten	1 October 2002 (aged 22)	5	1	(Ukrainian Association of Football) Kolos Kovalivka
21	MF	Maksym Braharu	21 July 2002 (aged 22)	30	2	(Ukrainian Association of Football) Dynamo Kyiv
22	MF	Valentyn Rubchynskyi	15 February 2002 (aged 23)	16	1	(Ukrainian Association of Football) Dynamo Kyiv
23	GK	Vladyslav Krapyvtsov	25 June 2005 (aged 19)	0	0	(Royal Spanish Football Federation) Girona
