= Jan Koutný =

Jan Koutný may refer to:

- Jan Koutný (footballer) (born 2004), Czech footballer
- Jan Koutný (gymnast) (1897–1976), Czech gymnast
