= 2024 UEFA European Under-19 Championship =

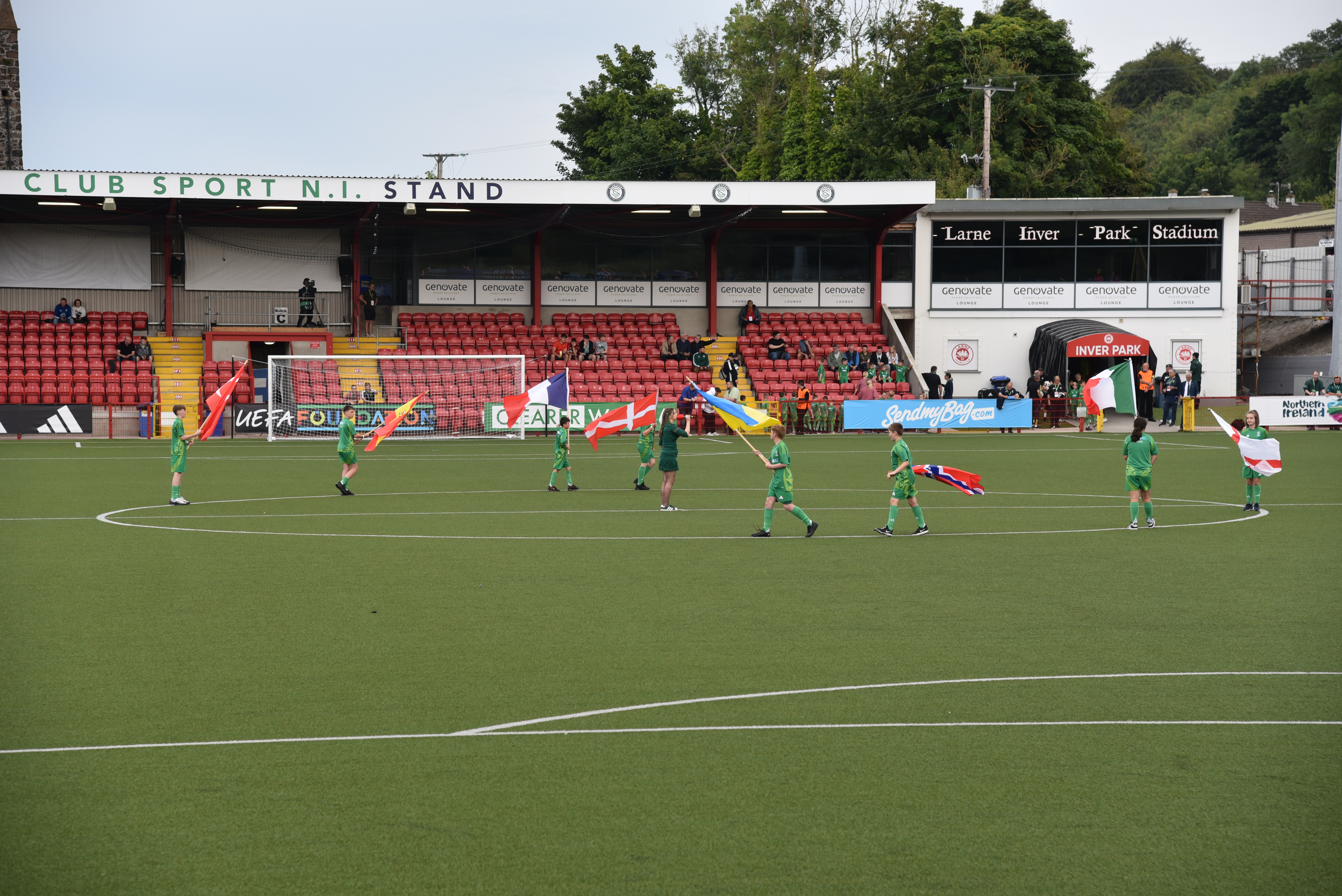
- Flag parade of the participating nations

Tournament details
- Host country: Northern Ireland
- Dates: 15–28 July
- Teams: 8 (from 1 confederation)
- Venues: 3 (in 2 host cities)

Final positions
- Champions: Spain (12th title)
- Runners-up: France

Tournament statistics
- Matches played: 16
- Goals scored: 43 (2.69 per match)
- Attendance: 25,046 (1,565 per match)
- Top scorer(s): (Norway) Daniel Braut (3 goals)
- Best player: (Spain) Iker Bravo

The 2024 UEFA European Under-19 Championship (also known as UEFA Under-19 Euro 2024) was the 21st edition of the UEFA European Under-19 Championship (71st edition if the Under-18 and Junior eras are included), the annual international youth football championship organised by UEFA for the men's under-19 national teams of Europe. Northern Ireland hosted the tournament from 15 to 28 July 2024. A total of eight teams played in the tournament, with players born on or after 1 January 2005 eligible to participate.

Same as previous editions held in even-numbered years, the tournament will act as the UEFA qualifiers for the FIFA U-20 World Cup. The top five teams of the tournament will qualify for the 2025 FIFA U-20 World Cup in Chile as the UEFA representatives.

Italy were the defending champions, having beaten Portugal 1–0 in the 2023 final, but were eliminated in the semi-finals by Spain.

== Host selection ==
Northern Ireland was appointed as the host for the tournament by the UEFA Executive Committee during their meeting on 19 April 2021 in Montreux, Switzerland.

== Qualification ==
=== Qualified teams ===
The following teams qualified for the final tournament.

Note: All appearance statistics include only U-19 era (since 2002).

Team	Method of qualification	Appearance	Last appearance	Previous best performance
Northern Ireland	Hosts	2nd	2005 (Group stage)	Group stage (2005)
France	Elite round Group 2 winners	13th	2022 (Semi-finals)	Champions (2005, 2010, 2016)
Turkey	Elite round Group 6 winners	7th	2018 (Group stage)	Runners-up (2004)
Spain	Elite round Group 1 winners	14th	2023 (Semi-finals)	Champions (2002, 2004, 2006, 2007, 2011, 2012, 2015, 2019)
Ukraine	Elite round Group 7 winners	6th	2018 (Semi-finals)	Champions (2009)
Italy	Elite round Group 5 winners	10th	2023 (Champions)	Champions (2003, 2023)
Norway	Elite round Group 3 winners	7th	2023 (Semi-finals)	Semi-finals (2023)
Denmark	Elite round Group 4 winners	1st	Debut	

== Venues ==
The tournament was hosted in 3 venues.

2024 UEFA European Under-19 Championship is located in Northern Ireland	Belfast		Larne
2024 UEFA European Under-19 Championship is located in Northern Ireland	Windsor Park	Seaview	Inver Park
2024 UEFA European Under-19 Championship is located in Northern Ireland	Capacity: 18,500	Capacity: 3,383	Capacity: 3,000

== Officials ==
A total of 6 Referees, 8 Assistants and 2 Fourth Officials were selected for the tournament.

Referees	Assistant Referees	Fourth Officials
Ishmael Barbara (Malta)	Dyon Fikkert (Netherlands)	Edgars Maļcevs (Latvia)
Marian Barbu (Romania)	Andreas Fotopoulos (Greece)	Jamie Robinson (Northern Ireland)
(Bosnia and Herzegovina) Luka Bilbija (Bosnia)	Benas Kikutis (Lithuania)	
Vassilis Fotias (Greece)	Mihai Marica (Romania)	
Henrik Nalbandyan (Armenia)	Slagjan Markoski (North Macedonia)	
Sander van der Eijk (Netherlands)	Atom Sevgulyan (Armenia)	
	(Bosnia and Herzegovina) Aleksandar Smiljanić (Bosnia)	
	Duncan Spencer (Malta)	

== Group stage ==
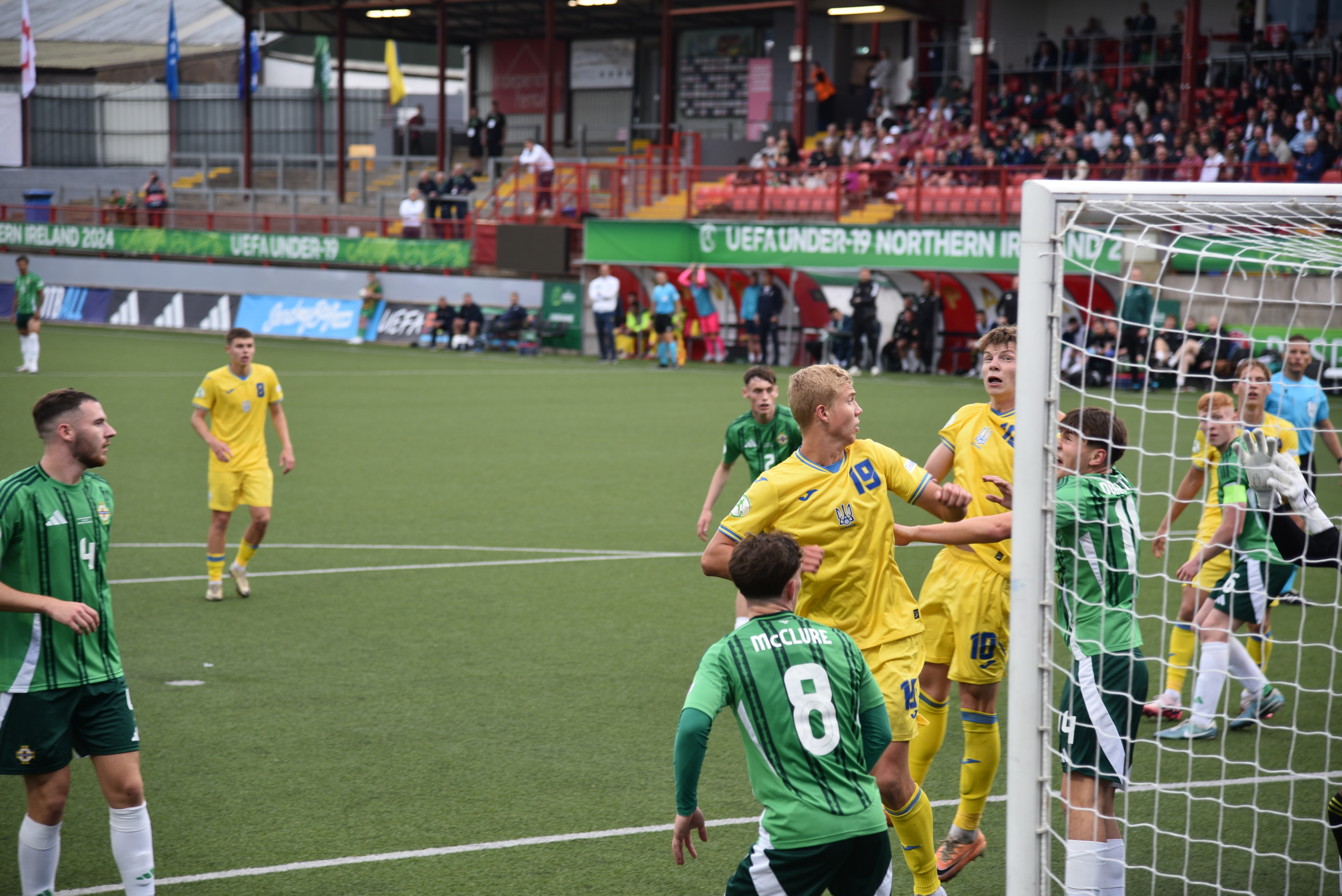
Match between Northern Ireland and Ukraine

The group winners and runners-up advanced to the semi-finals and qualify for the 2025 FIFA U-20 World Cup.

Tie-breaking criteria for group play
The ranking of teams in the group stage is determined as follows:
1. Points obtained in all group matches;
2. Points in head-to-head matches among tied teams;
3. Goal difference in head-to-head matches among tied teams;
4. Goals scored in head-to-head matches among tied teams;
5. If more than two teams are tied, and after applying all head-to-head criteria above, a subset of teams are still tied, all head-to-head criteria above are reapplied exclusively to this subset of teams;
6. Goal difference in all group matches;
7. Goals scored in all group matches;
8. Penalty shoot-out if only two teams have the same number of points, and they met in the last round of the group and are tied after applying all criteria above (not used if more than two teams have the same number of points, or if their rankings are not relevant for qualification for the next stage);
9. Disciplinary points
  - Yellow card: −1 point;
  - Indirect red card (second yellow card): −3 points;
  - Direct red card: −3 points;
10. UEFA coefficient for the qualifying round draw;
11. Drawing of lots.

=== Group A ===
Pos	Team	Pld	W	D	L	GF	GA	GD	Pts	Qualification
1	Italy	3	2	0	1	7	4	+3	6	Knockout stage and 2025 FIFA U-20 World Cup
2	Ukraine	3	1	2	0	3	2	+1	5	Knockout stage and 2025 FIFA U-20 World Cup
3	Norway	3	1	1	1	3	2	+1	4	FIFA U-20 World Cup play-off
4	Northern Ireland (H)	3	0	1	2	0	5	−5	1	

Updated to match(es) played on 18 July 2024. Source: UEFA
Rules for classification: Group stage tiebreakers
(H) Hosts
15 July 2024
16:30

Italy	2–1	Norway
Di Maggio 44'; Zeroli 51'	Report	Braut 35'

Seaview, Belfast
Attendance: 1,043
Referee: Marian Alexandru Barbu (Romania)
15 July 2024
20:00

Northern Ireland	0–0	Ukraine
	Report

Inver Park, Larne
Attendance: 1,261
Referee: Luka Bilbija (Bosnia and Herzegovina)

18 July 2024
16:30

Norway	0–0	Ukraine
	Report

Seaview, Belfast
Attendance: 612
Referee: Henrik Nalbandyan (Armenia)
18 July 2024
20:00

Northern Ireland	0–3	Italy
	Report	Zeroli 15'; Camarda 45+2', 48'

Inver Park, Larne
Attendance: 1,808
Referee: Ishmael Barbara (Malta)

21 July 2024
20:00

Norway	2–0	Northern Ireland
Braut 33', 65'	Report

Seaview, Belfast
Attendance: 2,401
Referee: Sander van der Eijk (Netherlands)
21 July 2024
20:00

Ukraine	3–2	Italy
Synchuk 7'; Krevsun 54'; Ponomarenko 75' (pen.)	Report	Ebone 34'; Romano 52'

Inver Park, Larne
Attendance: 654
Referee: Vassilis Fotias (Greece)

=== Group B ===
Pos	Team	Pld	W	D	L	GF	GA	GD	Pts	Qualification
1	France	3	2	1	0	8	5	+3	7	Knockout stage and 2025 FIFA U-20 World Cup
2	Spain	3	1	2	0	5	4	+1	5	Knockout stage and 2025 FIFA U-20 World Cup
3	Turkey	3	0	2	1	5	6	−1	2	FIFA U-20 World Cup play-off
4	Denmark	3	0	1	2	6	9	−3	1	

Source: UEFA
Rules for classification: Group stage tiebreakers
16 July 2024
16:30

Denmark	1–2	Spain
Krüger-Johnsen 43'	Report	Andrés 26'; Bravo 79'

Inver Park, Larne
Attendance: 622
Referee: Sander van der Eijk (Netherlands)
16 July 2024
20:00

France	2–1	Turkey
Michal 66'; Jacquet 86' (pen.)	Report	Fidan 4'

Seaview, Belfast
Attendance: 1,003
Referee: Vassilis Fotias (Greece)

19 July 2024
16:30

Denmark	2–4	France
Olsson 87'; Simmelhack 90+3'	Report	Bahoya 19'; Aiki 65'; Bouabré 80'; Assoumani 85'

Inver Park, Larne
Attendance: 672
Referee: Luka Bilbija (Bosnia and Herzegovina)
19 July 2024
20:00

Turkey	1–1	Spain
Ay 90'	Report	Gąsiorowski 55'

Seaview, Belfast
Attendance: 1,124
Referee: Marian Alexandru Barbu (Romania)

22 July 2024
20:00

Turkey	3–3	Denmark
Bars 27'; Yıldırım 53'; Sarıkaya 70'	Report	Schwartau 18'; Krüger-Johnsen 64'; Simmelhack 76'

Seaview, Belfast
Attendance: 531
Referee: Ishmael Barbara (Malta)
22 July 2024
20:00

Spain	2–2	France
Rodríguez 65'; Keddari 74'	Report	Bouabré 13'; Atangana 90'

Inver Park, Larne
Attendance: 1,726
Referee: Henrik Nalbandyan (Armenia)

== Knockout stage ==
=== Bracket ===
Semi-finals
25 July – Belfast
Italy	0
Spain (a.e.t.)	1
25 July – Belfast
France	1
Ukraine	0

Final
28 July – Belfast
Spain	2
France	0

=== FIFA U-20 World Cup play-off ===
Winners qualified for the 2025 FIFA U-20 World Cup.

25 July 2024
17:30

Norway	1–1 (a.e.t.)	Turkey
Holten 15'	Report	Vural 81'
Penalties
Holten (penalty scored); Andresen (penalty scored); Granaas (penalty scored); Auklend (penalty scored); Braut (penalty scored); Helland (penalty scored); Pedersen (penalty scored); Bang-Kittilsen (penalty scored); Gonstad (penalty scored); Røsten (penalty scored)	10–9	(penalty scored) Uzun; (penalty scored) Bülbül; (penalty scored) Demircan; (penalty scored) Vural; (penalty scored) Yıldırım; (penalty scored) Ay; (penalty scored) Kayalı; (penalty scored) Sarıkaya; (penalty scored) Yılmaz; (penalty missed) Gezek

Seaview, Belfast
Attendance: 317
Referee: Sander van der Eijk (Netherlands)

=== Semi-finals ===
25 July 2024
15:00

Italy	0–1 (a.e.t.)	Spain
	Report	Fortuny 100'

Windsor Park, Belfast
Attendance: 1,302
Referee: Marian Alexandru Barbu (Romania)

25 July 2024
20:00

France	1–0	Ukraine
Atangana 61'	Report

Windsor Park, Belfast
Attendance: 1,612
Referee: Ishmael Barbara (Malta)

=== Final ===
28 July 2024
20:00

Spain	2–0	France
Bravo 41'; Diao 69'	Report

Windsor Park, Belfast
Attendance: 8,358
Referee: Vassilis Fotias (Greece)

== Qualified teams for FIFA U-20 World Cup ==
The following five teams from UEFA qualified for the 2025 FIFA U-20 World Cup in Chile.

Team	Qualified on	Previous appearances in FIFA U-20 World Cup^{1}
Italy	18 July 2024	8 (1977, 1981, 1987, 2005, 2009, 2017, 2019, 2023)
France	19 July 2024	8 (1977, 1997, 2001, 2011, **2013**, 2017, 2019, 2023)
Ukraine	21 July 2024	4 (2001, 2005, 2015, **2019**)
Spain	22 July 2024	15 (1977, 1979, 1981, 1985, 1989, 1991, 1995, 1997, **1999**, 2003, 2005, 2007, 2009, 2011, 2013)
Norway	25 July 2024	3 (1989, 1993, 2019)

^{1} Bold indicates champions for that year. Italic indicates hosts for that year.

== Goalscorers ==
There were 43 goals scored in 16 matches, for an average of 2.69 goals per match.

3 goals

- (Norway) Daniel Braut

2 goals

- (Denmark) Mikel Krüger-Johnsen
- (Denmark) Alexander Simmelhack
- (France) Valentin Atangana
- (France) Saïmon Bouabré
- (Italy) Francesco Camarda
- (Italy) Kevin Zeroli
- (Spain) Iker Bravo

1 goal

- (Denmark) Cornelius Olsson
- (Denmark) Oscar Schwartau
- (France) Ayman Aiki
- (France) Dehmaine Assoumani
- (France) Jean-Mattéo Bahoya
- (France) Jérémy Jacquet
- (France) Lucas Michal
- (Italy) Luca Di Maggio
- (Italy) Tommaso Ebone
- (Italy) Marco Romano
- (Norway) Rasmus Holten
- (Spain) Chema Andrés
- (Spain) Assane Diao
- (Spain) Pol Fortuny
- (Spain) Yarek Gasiorowski
- (Spain) Simo Keddari
- (Spain) Dani Rodríguez
- (Turkey) Fahri Kerem Ay
- (Turkey) Emir Bars
- (Turkey) Yiğit Fidan
- (Turkey) Efe Sarıkaya
- (Turkey) İsak Vural
- (Turkey) Poyraz Yıldırım
- (Ukraine) Danylo Krevsun
- (Ukraine) Matviy Ponomarenko
- (Ukraine) Hennadiy Synchuk

Source: UEFA

== Team of the Tournament ==
The UEFA Technical Observer team announced the team of the tournament.

Goalkeeper	Defenders	Midfielders	Forwards
(Ukraine) Vladyslav Krapyvtsov	(Italy) Mattia Mannini; (France) Jérémy Jacquet; (Spain) Yarek Gasiorowski; (Turkey) Berkay Yılmaz	(France) Valentin Atangana; (Spain) Gerard Hernández; (Italy) Luca Di Maggio	(Spain) Dani Rodríguez; (Spain) Iker Bravo; (France) Saïmon Bouabré
