= Simo Keddari =

Spanish-born Algerian footballer (born 2005)

Simo
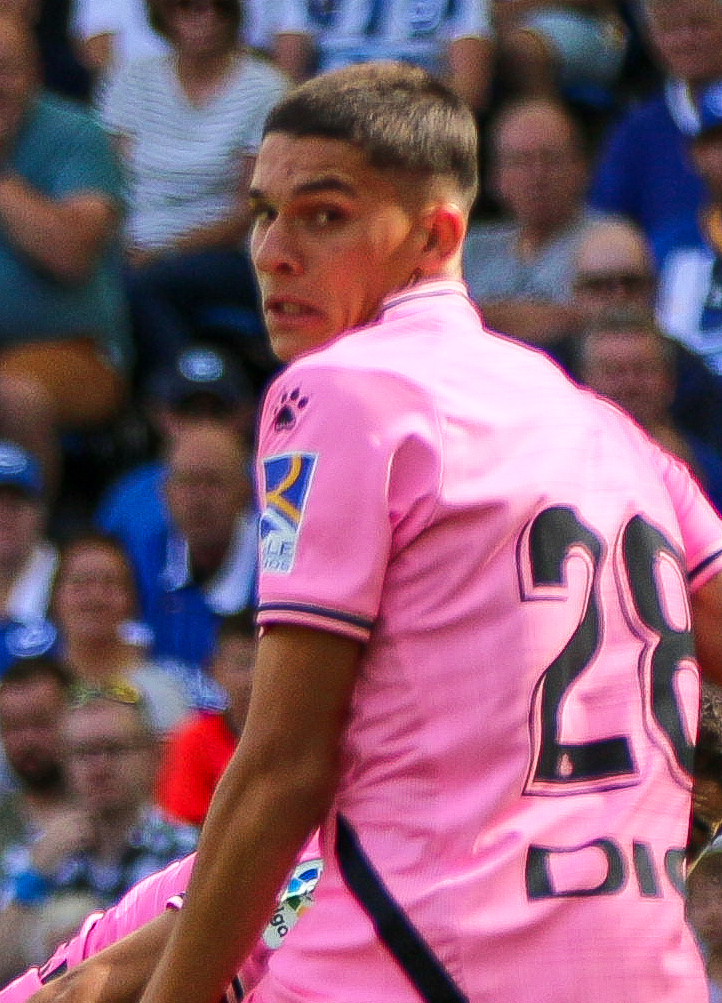
- Simo with Espanyol in 2022

Personal information
- Full name: Wassim Keddari Boulif
- Date of birth: 3 February 2005 (age 21)
- Place of birth: Terrassa, Spain
- Height: 1.83 m (6 ft 0 in)
- Position: Centre-back

Team information
- Current team: Al-Arabi
- Number: 5

Youth career
- Jàbac Terrassa
- 2016–2022: Espanyol

Senior career*
Years	Team	Apps	(Gls)
2021–2023	Espanyol B	19	(1)
2022–2023	Espanyol	7	(0)
2023–	Al-Arabi	42	(1)

International career^{‡}
2021	Algeria U18	2	(0)
2022	Spain U17	11	(0)
2023	Spain U18	2	(0)
2023–2024	Spain U19	15	(3)
2025–2026	Spain U21	3	(1)
2026–	Algeria	0	(0)
Medal record
Men's football
Representing Spain
UEFA European Under-19 Championship
Winner	2024 Northern Ireland
- * Club domestic league appearances and goals as of 17 January 2026 ‡ National team caps and goals as of 20:32, 14 October 2025 (UTC)

Wassim Keddari Boulif (Arabic: وسيم كداري بوليف; born 3 February 2005), commonly known as Simo, is a professional footballer who plays as a centre-back for Qatar Stars League club Al-Arabi SC.

== Club career ==
Born in Terrassa, Barcelona, Catalonia, Simo joined RCD Espanyol's youth setup in 2016, from hometown side UFB Jàbac Terrassa. On 3 July 2021, while still a youth, he signed a five-year contract with the club.

Simo made his senior debut with the reserves on 12 December 2021, starting in a 4–1 Segunda División RFEF away routing of SD Ejea. He scored his first goal the following 5 February, netting a last-minute equalizer in a 3–3 draw at CF Badalona.

Simo made his first team – and La Liga – debut on 4 September 2022, coming on as a second-half substitute for Keidi Bare in a 1–0 away success over Athletic Bilbao. On 10 August of the following year, he was transferred to Qatar Stars League club Al-Arabi SC.

== Honours ==
Spain U19

- UEFA European Under-19 Championship: 2024
