= Gerard Hernández =

Spanish footballer (born 2005)

Personal information
- Full name: Gerard Hernández Romero
- Date of birth: 31 March 2005 (age 21)
- Place of birth: Sant Jaume dels Domenys, Spain
- Position: Midfielder

Team information
- Current team: Al-Arabi
- Number: 16

Youth career
- 2012–2023: Barcelona
- 2023–2024: Villarreal

Senior career*
Years	Team	Apps	(Gls)
2023–2024	Villarreal C	2	(1)
2024–2025	Villarreal B	1	(0)
2024–2025	→ Elche (loan)	12	(0)
2025–	Al-Arabi	5	(0)

International career^{‡}
2019–2020	Spain U15	6	(1)
2021–2022	Spain U17	11	(0)
2022–2023	Spain U18	5	(0)
2023–2024	Spain U19	12	(1)
2025–	Spain U21	4	(0)
Medal record
Men's football
Representing Spain
UEFA European Under-19 Championship
Winner	2024 Northern Ireland
- * Club domestic league appearances and goals as of 17 January 2026 ‡ National team caps and goals as of 22:33, 14 October 2025 (UTC)

Gerard Hernández Romero (born 31 March 2005) is a Spanish footballer who plays as a midfielder for Qatari club Al-Arabi.

== Club career ==
Born in Sant Jaume dels Domenys, Tarragona, Catalonia, Hernández joined FC Barcelona's La Masia in 2012, aged seven. In May 2023, he was called up by Xavi to train with the first team.

On 14 July 2023, Hernández left Barça and signed for Villarreal CF. Initially a member of the Juvenil squad, he made his senior debut with the C-team on 17 March 2024, starting and scoring the opener in a 3–1 Tercera Federación home win over CD Utiel.

Hernández made his professional debut with the reserves on 2 June 2024, coming on as a late substitute for Dani Requena in a 1–0 Segunda División home win over Racing de Santander, as his side was already relegated from Segunda División. On 30 August, he was loaned to Elche CF in the second division, for one year.

On 27 July 2025, Hernández moved abroad for the first time in his career, after agreeing to a with Al-Arabi SC of the Qatar Stars League.

== International career ==
Hernández represented Spain at under-15, under-17, under-18 and under-19 levels.

== Honours ==
Spain U19

- UEFA European Under-19 Championship: 2024

Individual

- UEFA European Under-19 Championship Team of the Tournament: 2024
