= Saïmon Bouabré =

French footballer (born 2006)

Personal information
- Full name: Saïmon Nadélia Bouabré
- Date of birth: 1 June 2006 (age 20)
- Place of birth: Saint-Étienne, France
- Height: 1.74 m (5 ft 9 in)
- Position: Attacking midfielder

Team information
- Current team: Al-Hilal
- Number: 70

Youth career
- 2013–2017: Saint-Étienne
- 2017–2018: Andrézieux-Bouthéon
- 2018–2021: Air Bel
- 2021–2024: Monaco

Senior career*
Years	Team	Apps	(Gls)
2024–2025	Monaco	4	(0)
2025–2026	Neom	11	(1)
2026–	Al-Hilal	8	(0)

International career^{‡}
2021–2022	France U16	13	(2)
2023	France U17	11	(0)
2023	France U18	10	(1)
2024	France U19	7	(2)
2024–2025	France U20	14	(3)
2025–	France U21	4	(0)
Medal record
Men's football
Representing France
UEFA European Under-19 Championship
Runner-up	2024 Northern Ireland
FIFA U-17 World Cup
Runner-up	2023 Indonesia
UEFA European Under-17 Championship
Runner-up	2023 Hungary
- * Club domestic league appearances and goals as of 10 October 2026 ‡ National team caps and goals as of 30 March 2026

Saïmon Nadélia Bouabré (born 1 June 2006) is a French professional footballer who plays as an attacking midfielder for Saudi Pro League club Al-Hilal.

== Early career ==
Born in Saint-Étienne, Bouabré started playing football in the youth team of AS Saint-Étienne. He then played for Andrézieux-Bouthéon FC and SC Air Bel before joining the youth side of Monaco. He was part of the under-18 team which won the Coupe Gambardella during the 2022–2023 season after. With a goal and an assist, his performance in the final against Clermont Foot highly impressed the media.

On 2 August 2025, Bouabré joined Saudi Pro League club Neom.

On 2 February 2026, he joined Al Hilal.

== International career ==
Born in France, Bouabré is of Ivorian descent. He was called to the France U17 squad for the 2023 UEFA European Under-17 Championship. Throughout the tournament, he started in all matches and lead France to the final, where Bouabré eventually missed the decisive shot during the penalty shoot-out which made Germany win the title. Therefore, he was named in the Team of the tournament.

He took part in the 2023 FIFA U-17 World Cup with the France under-17s. In the final game against Germany, he scored a goal in the 53rd minute to help France reduce the score to 1–2 before Mathis Amougou equalized the score in the 85th minute, leading the match to the penalty shootouts. For the second time in the year, Bouabré and his teammates lost to Germany on penalties and finished as runners-up.

== Career statistics ==
As of match played 17 May 2025

Appearances and goals by club, season and competition
Club	Season	League			Coupe de France		Continental		Other		Total	
Club	Season	Division	Apps	Goals	Apps	Goals	Apps	Goals	Apps	Goals	Apps	Goals
AS Monaco	2023–24	Ligue 1	1	0	0	0	—		—		1	0
AS Monaco	2024–25	Ligue 1	3	0	1	0	0	0	—		4	0
Career total			4	0	1	0	0	0	0	0	5	0

== Honours ==
France U17

- UEFA European Under-17 Championship runner-up: 2023
- FIFA U-17 World Cup runner-up: 2023

France U19

- UEFA European Under-19 Championship runner-up: 2024

France U20

- Maurice Revello Tournament: 2025

Individual

- UEFA European Under-17 Championship Team of the Tournament: 2023
- UEFA European Under-19 Championship Team of the Tournament: 2024
