= Rony Jansson =

Finnish footballer (born 2004)

Personal information
- Full name: Rony Jene Aleksi Jansson
- Date of birth: 10 January 2004 (age 22)
- Place of birth: Espoo, Finland
- Height: 1.83 m (6 ft 0 in)
- Position: Defender

Team information
- Current team: St. Pauli

Youth career
- –2018: GrIFK
- 2018–2021: HJK
- 2022: Kalmar

Senior career*
Years	Team	Apps	(Gls)
2021	Klubi 04	3	(0)
2022–2026	Kalmar	59	(3)
2026–	St. Pauli	0	(0)

International career^{‡}
2019	Finland U16	4	(0)
2021–2022	Finland U18	3	(1)
2022	Finland U19	6	(0)
2023–	Finland U21	18	(0)
2026–	Finland	1	(0)
- * Club domestic league appearances and goals as of 31 July 2026 ‡ National team caps and goals as of 5 June 2026

Rony Jene Aleksi Jansson (born 10 January 2004) is a Finnish professional footballer who plays for 2. Bundesliga club St. Pauli as a defender.

== Early years ==
Born in Espoo, Jansson started to play football in a youth team of Grankulla IFK in Kauniainen. He joined the youth sector of HJK in 2018, and spent one season with the reserve team Klubi 04 in the second tier Ykkönen in 2021.

== Club career ==
Jansson signed with Swedish club Kalmar FF in the summer 2022, and was first registered to under-19 and under-21 academy squads. Jansson told later that he had turned down an offer from Genoa before moving to Sweden.

Ahead of the 2023 season, Jansson was promoted to the Kalmar FF first team squad. He made his Allsvenskan debut on 3 July 2023 from the bench, playing 30 minutes in a 1–1 away draw against Mjällby.

On 3 August 2023, Jansson debuted in the European competitions, as a late substitute to Robert Gojani, in a UEFA Conference League qualifying loss against Pyunik Yerevan.

On 19 September 2023, Jansson renewed his contract with Kalmar, signing a new four-year deal. On 31 July 2026, it was announced that Jansson moved to St. Pauli.

== International career ==
Jansson is a regular Finnish youth international. He got his first call-up to Finland U21 national team on 24 August 2023 for the matches in September but had to withdraw. On 29 September, he was called up to UEFA Under-21 Euro Championship qualifying matches against Albania and Romania on 13 and 17 October 2023, respectively. He made six appearances in the 2025 UEFA European Under-21 Championship qualification campaign, helping Finland U21 to qualify for the final tournament, and played in all three matches of the final tournament.

Jansson made his full international debut for Finland senior national team on 5 June 2026, in a friendly match against Hungary.

== Personal life ==
Despite his Swedish-sounding name, Jansson does not speak Swedish as his mother tongue. His great-grandmother was half-Swedish.

== Career statistics ==
=== Club ===
As of 31 July 2026

Appearances and goals by club, season and competition
Club	Season	League			National cup (Note: Includes Svenska Cupen)		Continental		Other		Total	
Club	Season	Division	Apps	Goals	Apps	Goals	Apps	Goals	Apps	Goals	Apps	Goals
Klubi 04	2021	Ykkönen	3	0	0	0	—		—		3	0
Kalmar FF	2022	Allsvenskan	0	0	1	0	—		—		1	0
Kalmar FF	2023	Allsvenskan	4	0	1	0	1 (Note: Includes UEFA Europa Conference League)	0	—		6	0
Kalmar FF	2024	Allsvenskan	16	0	3	0	—		—		19	0
Kalmar FF	2025	Superettan	25	0	1	0	—		—		26	0
Kalmar FF	2026	Allsvenskan	14	3	3	0	—		—		17	3
Kalmar FF	Total		59	3	9	0	1	0	0	0	69	3
St. Pauli	2026–27	2. Bundesliga	0	0	0	0	—		—		0	0
Career total			62	3	9	0	1	0	0	0	72	3

=== International ===
As of match played 5 June 2026

National team	Year	Competitive		Friendly		Total	
National team	Year	Apps	Goals	Apps	Goals	Apps	Goals
Finland	2026	0 (Note: Appearances in the 2026–27 UEFA Nations League C.)	0	1	0	1	0
Total		0	0	1	0	1	0
