= Kacper Trelowski =

Polish footballer (born 2003)

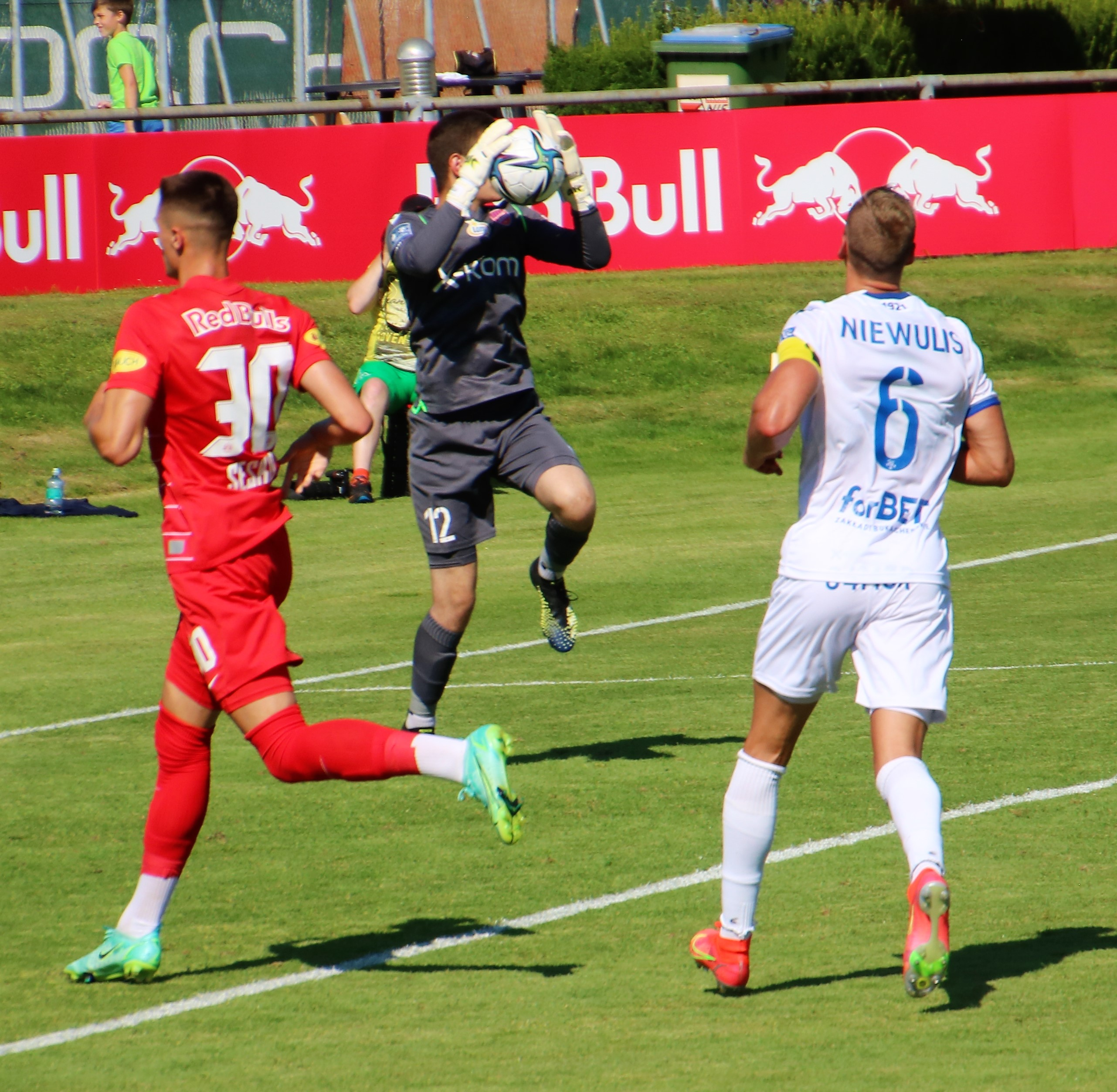
- Trelowski (middle) playing for Raków Częstochowa in 2021

Personal information
- Date of birth: 19 August 2003 (age 23)
- Place of birth: Częstochowa, Poland
- Height: 1.93 m (6 ft 4 in)
- Position: Goalkeeper

Team information
- Current team: Raków Częstochowa
- Number: 1

Youth career
- 2011–2012: Ajaks Częstochowa
- 2012–2014: APN Częstochowa
- 2014–2019: Raków Częstochowa

Senior career*
Years	Team	Apps	(Gls)
2019–	Raków Częstochowa	65	(0)
2021	→ Sokół Ostróda (loan)	11	(0)
2023–2024	→ Śląsk Wrocław (loan)	1	(0)
2023–2024	→ Śląsk Wrocław II (loan)	8	(0)

International career
2023	Poland U20	1	(0)
2022–2025	Poland U21	3	(0)
- * Club domestic league appearances and goals as of 22:12, 28 August 2026 (UTC)

Kacper Trelowski (born 19 August 2003) is a Polish professional footballer who plays as a goalkeeper for Ekstraklasa club Raków Częstochowa.

== Club career ==
=== Youth career ===
From 2011 to 2019, Trelowski played for various youth teams from Częstochowa during his youth career, for Ajaks, APN and Raków Częstochowa.

=== Senior career ===
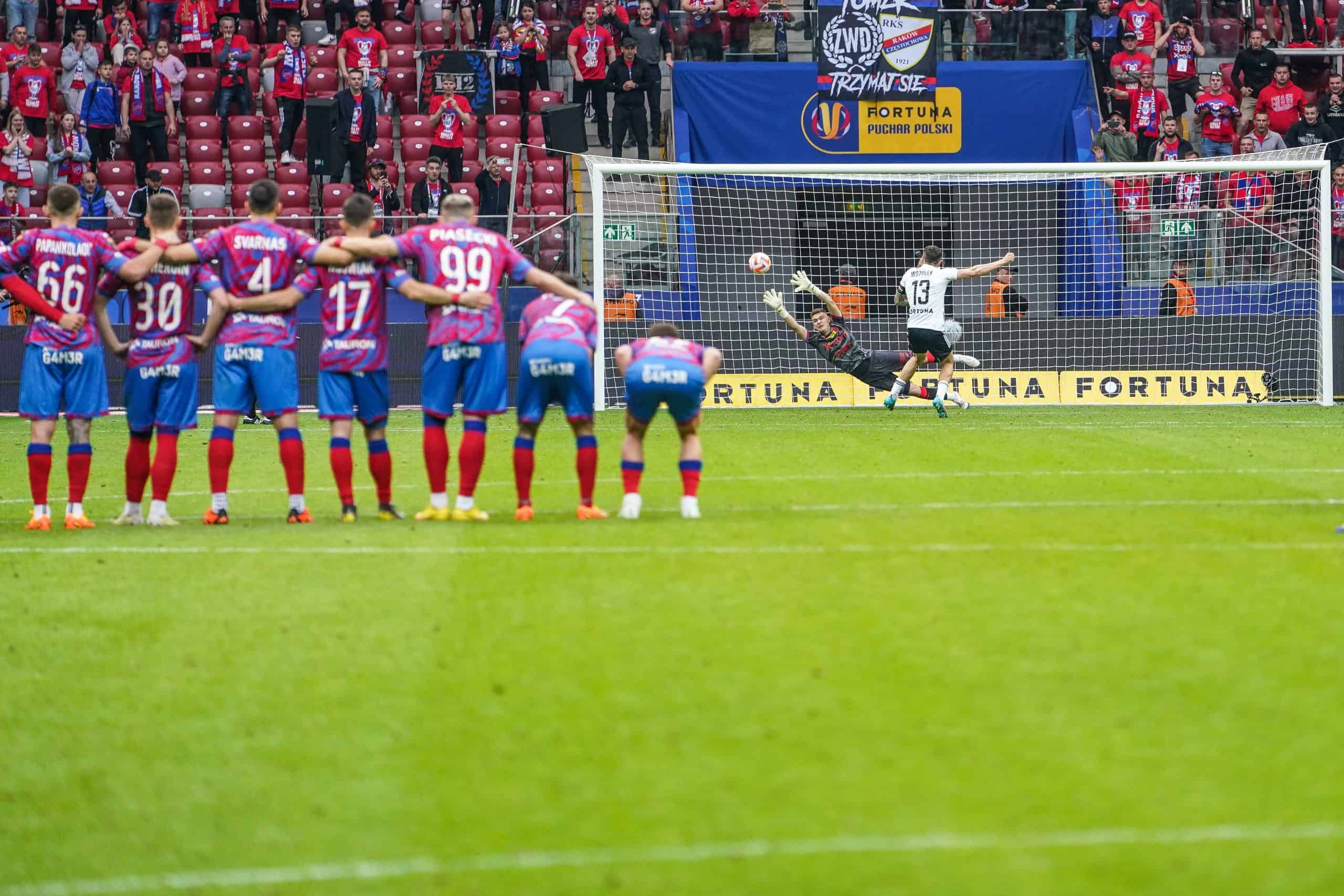
Trelowski in action during the 2022–23 Polish Cup final against Paweł Wszołek

Trelowski made his senior club debut at Sokół Ostróda in 2021 while being loaned out from Raków. He made his Ekstraklasa debut for Raków against Wisła Kraków on 8 August 2021. He also played the 2021–22 Polish Cup final against Lech Poznań on 2 May 2022.

He made his European debut during a UEFA Europa Conference League qualifying match against Spartak Trnava on 4 August 2022.

On 28 August 2023, Trelowski was loaned out to Śląsk Wrocław for one season.

After returning from loan, Trelowski established himself as the first-choice goalkeeper at Raków. He appeared in all 34 league games across the 2024–25 season, kept 17 clean sheets, and was named the Ekstraklasa Young Player of the Season.

== International career ==
In October 2024, Trelowski got his first senior call up for Poland for two matches against Portugal and Croatia in the Nations League, replacing the injured Bartłomiej Drągowski.

== Career statistics ==
As of match played 27 August 2026

Appearances and goals by club, season and competition
Club	Season	League			Polish Cup		Continental		Other		Total	
Club	Season	Division	Apps	Goals	Apps	Goals	Apps	Goals	Apps	Goals	Apps	Goals
Sokół Ostróda (loan)	2020–21	II liga	11	0	0	0	—		—		11	0
Raków Częstochowa	2021–22	Ekstraklasa	7	0	6	0	0	0	0	0	13	0
Raków Częstochowa	2022–23	Ekstraklasa	6	0	5	0	3 (Note: Appearances in UEFA Conference League)	0	0	0	14	0
Raków Częstochowa	2024–25	Ekstraklasa	34	0	1	0	—		—		35	0
Raków Częstochowa	2025–26	Ekstraklasa	16	0	1	0	8	0	—		25	0
Raków Częstochowa	2026–27	Ekstraklasa	2	0	0	0	6	0	—		8	0
Raków Częstochowa	Total		65	0	13	0	17	0	0	0	95	0
Śląsk Wrocław (loan)	2023–24	Ekstraklasa	1	0	1	0	—		—		2	0
Śląsk Wrocław II (loan)	2023–24	III liga, gr. III	8	0	—		—		—		8	0
Career total			85	0	14	0	17	0	0	0	116	0

== Honours ==
Raków Częstochowa II

- IV liga Silesia I: 2021–22

Raków Częstochowa

- Ekstraklasa: 2022–23
- Polish Cup: 2021–22

Individual

- Ekstraklasa Young Player of the Season: 2024–25
- Ekstraklasa Young Player of the Month: February 2025
