= Fahri Kerem Ay =

Turkish footballer (born 2005)

Personal information
- Date of birth: 1 January 2005 (age 21)
- Place of birth: Erdemli, Turkey
- Height: 1.78 m (5 ft 10 in)
- Position: Midfielder

Team information
- Current team: Çorluspor (on loan from Beşiktaş)

Youth career
- 2014–2019: Erdemli Belediyespor
- 2019–2024: Beşiktaş

Senior career*
Years	Team	Apps	(Gls)
2024–	Beşiktaş	4	(0)
2025–2026	→ İstanbulspor (loan)	7	(1)
2026–	→ Çorluspor (loan)	0	(0)

International career^{‡}
2022	Turkey U17	3	(1)
2022	Turkey U18	7	(1)
2024	Turkey U19	5	(1)
- * Club domestic league appearances and goals as of 24 October 2026 ‡ National team caps and goals as of 05:38, 9 February 2025 (UTC)

Çorluspor

Fahri Kerem Ay (born 1 January 2005) is a Turkish professional footballer who plays as a midfielder for TFF Second League club Çorluspor on loan from Beşiktaş.

== Career ==
Ay is a product of the youth academy of Erdemli Belediyespor before moving to Beşiktaş' youth side in 2017 where he finished his development. On 22 March 2024, he signed his first professional contract with Beşiktaş until 2026. He made his senior and professional debut with Beşiktaş as a substitute in a 0–0 Süper Lig tie with Alanyaspor on 12 May 2024. On 13 August 2024, he extended his contract until 2028.

On 14 August 2025, Ay was loaned to TFF First League club İstanbulspor until the end of the season.

On 4 September 2026, Ay was loaned to TFF Second League club Çorluspor until the end of the season.

== International career ==
Ay is a youth international for Turkey. He was part of the Turkey U19s that played at the 2024 UEFA European Under-19 Championship.

== Honours ==
Beşiktaş

- Turkish Super Cup: 2024
