= France national under-20 football team =

National under-20 association football team representing France

France U-20
- Nickname(s): Les Bleuets (The Little Blues); Les Tricolores (The Tri-colours)
- Association: French Football Federation
- Confederation: UEFA (Europe)
- Head coach: Bernard Diomède
- FIFA code: FRA
| First colours | Second colours |

First international
- Spain 2–1 France (Radès, Tunisia; 28 June 1977)

Biggest win
- Indonesia 0–6 France (Murcia, Spain; 17 November 2022)

Biggest defeat
- Colombia 4–1 France (Bogotá, Colombia; 30 July 2011); Brazil 3–0 France (Kuching, Malaysia; 17 June, 1997); United States 3–0 France (Rancagua, Chile; 2 October, 2025)

FIFA U-20 World Cup
- Appearances: 9 (first in 1977)
- Best result: Champions (2013)

The France national under-20 football team (French: Équipe de France des moins de 20 ans de football) represents France in men's international football at this age level and is controlled by the French Football Federation. Since there is no under-20 UEFA tournament, the team competes for the FIFA U-20 World Cup. The under-20 team also participates in the Toulon Tournament, usually replacing the under-21 team, and in the football tournaments of the Mediterranean Games and the Jeux de la Francophonie.

France were the world champions, winning the 2013 FIFA U-20 World Cup. The team reached the semifinals for the first time in their history in 2011, and they have also made it to the quarterfinals in two occasions, in 1997 and 2001.

== Competitive record ==
=== FIFA U-20 World Cup ===
| Year | Result | Pld | W | D* | L | GF | GA |
|---|---|---|---|---|---|---|---|
| (Tunisia) 1977 | Group stage | 3 | 1 | 1 | 1 | 3 | 3 |
| (Japan) 1979 | Did not qualify | | | | | | |
| (Australia) 1981 | Did not qualify | | | | | | |
| (Mexico) 1983 | Did not qualify | | | | | | |
| (Soviet Union) 1985 | Did not qualify | | | | | | |
| (Chile) 1987 | Did not qualify | | | | | | |
| (Saudi Arabia) 1989 | Did not qualify | | | | | | |
| (Portugal) 1991 | Did not qualify | | | | | | |
| (Australia) 1993 | Did not qualify | | | | | | |
| (Qatar) 1995 | Did not qualify | | | | | | |
| (Malaysia) 1997 | Quarter-finals | 5 | 3 | 1 | 1 | 10 | 8 |
| (Nigeria) 1999 | Did not qualify | | | | | | |
| (Argentina) 2001 | Quarter-finals | 5 | 2 | 2 | 1 | 11 | 7 |
| (United Arab Emirates) 2003 | Did not qualify | | | | | | |
| (Netherlands) 2005 | Did not qualify | | | | | | |
| (Canada) 2007 | Did not qualify | | | | | | |
| (Egypt) 2009 | Did not qualify | | | | | | |
| (Colombia) 2011 | Fourth place | 7 | 4 | 0 | 3 | 11 | 12 |
| (Turkey) 2013 | Champions | 7 | 4 | 2 | 1 | 15 | 6 |
| (New Zealand) 2015 | Did not qualify | | | | | | |
| (South Korea) 2017 | Round of 16 | 4 | 3 | 0 | 1 | 10 | 2 |
| (Poland) 2019 | Round of 16 | 4 | 3 | 0 | 1 | 9 | 5 |
| (Argentina) 2023 | Group stage | 3 | 1 | 0 | 2 | 5 | 5 |
| (Chile) 2025 | Fourth place | 7 | 4 | 1 | 2 | 12 | 7 |
| (Azerbaijan) (Uzbekistan) 2027 | Did not qualify | | | | | | |
| (Armenia) (Georgia (country)) 2029 | To be determined | | | | | | |
| Total | 9/26 | 45 | 25 | 7 | 13 | 86 | 55 |

* Draws include knockout matches decided by penalty shoot-out.

== Players ==
=== Current squad ===
The following players were named in the squad for the 2025 FIFA U-20 World Cup, to be played 27 September – 19 October 2025.

Caps and goals correct as of 29 September 2025, after the match against South Africa

| No. | Pos. | Player | Date of birth (age) | Caps | Goals | Club |
|---|---|---|---|---|---|---|
| 1 | GK | Lisandru Olmeta | 21 July 2005 (age 21) | 5 | 0 | (French Football Federation) SC Bastia |
| 16 | GK | Tao Paradowski | 27 February 2005 (age 21) | 5 | 0 | (French Football Federation) Pau |
| 21 | GK | Justin Bengui | 9 July 2005 (age 21) | 3 | 0 | (Royal Belgian Football Association) RWDM Brussels |
| 2 | DF | Gady Beyuku | 23 November 2005 (age 20) | 2 | 0 | (Italian Football Federation) Modena |
| 3 | DF | Justin Bourgault | 14 September 2005 (age 21) | 3 | 0 | (French Football Federation) Brest |
| 4 | DF | Steven Baseya | 14 January 2005 (age 21) | 5 | 0 | (Portuguese Football Federation) Alverca |
| 5 | DF | Elyaz Zidane | 26 December 2005 (age 20) | 11 | 1 | (Royal Spanish Football Federation) Real Betis |
| 12 | DF | Anthony Bermont | 10 February 2005 (age 21) | 2 | 1 | (French Football Federation) Lens |
| 14 | DF | Noham Kamara | 22 January 2007 (age 19) | 1 | 0 | (French Football Federation) Paris Saint-Germain |
| | DF | Nathan Zézé | 18 June 2005 (age 21) | 0 | 0 | (Saudi Arabian Football Federation) Neom |
| 6 | MF | Ilane Touré | 4 August 2006 (age 20) | 2 | 0 | (French Football Federation) Monaco (Note: Monaco is a Monégasque club playing in the French football league system) |
| 8 | MF | Rabby Nzingoula | 25 November 2005 (age 20) | 11 | 0 | (French Football Federation) Strasbourg |
| 10 | MF | Mayssam Benama | 9 March 2005 (age 21) | 12 | 0 | (French Football Federation) Annecy |
| 17 | MF | Andréa Le Borgne | 27 July 2006 (age 20) | 1 | 0 | (Italian Football Federation) Como |
| 19 | MF | Fodé Sylla | 16 April 2006 (age 20) | 1 | 0 | (French Football Federation) Lens |
| | MF | Saïmon Bouabré | 1 June 2006 (age 20) | 11 | 1 | (Saudi Arabian Football Federation) Neom |
| 7 | FW | Lucas Michal | 22 June 2005 (age 21) | 13 | 6 | (French Football Federation) Monaco |
| 11 | FW | Tadjidine Mmadi | 3 March 2007 (age 19) | 1 | 0 | (French Football Federation) Marseille |
| 13 | FW | Moustapha Dabo | 20 August 2007 (age 19) | 1 | 0 | (French Football Federation) Nantes |
| 18 | FW | Gabin Bernardeau | 24 January 2006 (age 20) | 0 | 0 | (French Football Federation) Nice |
| 20 | FW | Djylian N'Guessan | 30 August 2008 (age 18) | 1 | 0 | (French Football Federation) Saint-Étienne |

=== Recent call-ups ===
The following players had also been called up within the last twelve months, and remain eligible for selection.

| Pos. | Player | Date of birth (age) | Caps | Goals | Club | Latest call-up |

=== Previous squads ===
FIFA U-20 World Cup/Youth Championship squads

- 2013 FIFA U-20 World Cup – France
- 2011 FIFA U-20 World Cup – France
- 2001 FIFA World Youth Championship squads – France
- 1997 FIFA World Youth Championship squads – France
- 1977 FIFA World Youth Championship squads – France

== Head-to-head record ==
The following table shows France's head-to-head record in the FIFA U-20 World Cup.

| Opponent | Pld | W | D | L | GF | GA | GD | Win % |
|---|---|---|---|---|---|---|---|---|
| Argentina | 1 | 0 | 0 | 1 | 1 | 3 | −2 | 0.00 |
| Brazil | 1 | 0 | 0 | 1 | 0 | 3 | −3 | 0.00 |
| Colombia | 2 | 0 | 0 | 2 | 1 | 5 | −4 | 0.00 |
| Ecuador | 1 | 1 | 0 | 0 | 1 | 0 | +1 | 100.00 |
| Gambia | 1 | 0 | 0 | 1 | 1 | 2 | −1 | 0.00 |
| Germany | 1 | 1 | 0 | 0 | 3 | 2 | +1 | 100.00 |
| Ghana | 3 | 2 | 1 | 0 | 5 | 2 | +3 | 66.67 |
| Honduras | 2 | 2 | 0 | 0 | 6 | 1 | +5 | 100.00 |
| Iran | 1 | 1 | 0 | 0 | 5 | 0 | +5 | 100.00 |
| Italy | 1 | 0 | 0 | 1 | 1 | 2 | −1 | 0.00 |
| Japan | 1 | 1 | 0 | 0 | 1 | 0 | +1 | 100.00 |
| Mali | 2 | 2 | 0 | 0 | 5 | 2 | +3 | 100.00 |
| Mexico | 3 | 1 | 1 | 1 | 3 | 4 | −1 | 33.33 |
| Morocco | 1 | 0 | 1 | 0 | 1 | 1 | +0 | 0.00 |
| New Caledonia | 1 | 1 | 0 | 0 | 6 | 0 | +6 | 100.00 |
| New Zealand | 1 | 1 | 0 | 0 | 2 | 0 | +2 | 100.00 |
| Nigeria | 1 | 1 | 0 | 0 | 3 | 2 | +1 | 100.00 |
| Norway | 1 | 1 | 0 | 0 | 2 | 1 | +1 | 100.00 |
| Panama | 1 | 1 | 0 | 0 | 2 | 0 | +2 | 100.00 |
| Paraguay | 1 | 0 | 1 | 0 | 2 | 2 | +0 | 0.00 |
| Portugal | 1 | 0 | 0 | 1 | 0 | 2 | −2 | 0.00 |
| Saudi Arabia | 1 | 1 | 0 | 0 | 2 | 0 | +2 | 100.00 |
| South Africa | 2 | 2 | 0 | 0 | 6 | 3 | +3 | 100.00 |
| South Korea | 3 | 2 | 0 | 1 | 8 | 5 | +3 | 66.67 |
| Spain | 2 | 0 | 0 | 2 | 2 | 4 | −2 | 0.00 |
| Tunisia | 1 | 1 | 0 | 0 | 1 | 0 | +1 | 100.00 |
| Turkey | 1 | 1 | 0 | 0 | 4 | 1 | +3 | 100.00 |
| United States | 3 | 0 | 1 | 2 | 3 | 7 | −4 | 0.00 |
| Uruguay | 2 | 0 | 2 | 0 | 1 | 1 | +0 | 0.00 |
| Uzbekistan | 1 | 1 | 0 | 0 | 4 | 0 | +4 | 100.00 |
| Vietnam | 1 | 1 | 0 | 0 | 4 | 0 | +4 | 100.00 |
| Total | 44 | 25 | 7 | 12 | 86 | 54 | +32 | 56.82 |

== Honours ==
- FIFA U-20 World Cup

Champions: 2013

- Toulon Tournament

Champions (13): 1977, 1984, 1985, 1987, 1988, 1989, 1997, 2004, 2005, 2006, 2007, 2015, 2022
Finalists (14): 1975, 1976, 1978, 1980, 1986, 1991, 1993, 1995, 1996, 1998, 2009, 2011, 2014, 2016
