= Pol Fortuny =

Spanish footballer (born 2005)

Personal information
- Full name: Pol Fortuny Albareda
- Date of birth: 11 March 2005 (age 21)
- Place of birth: Tarragona, Spain
- Height: 1.75 m (5 ft 9 in)
- Position: Midfielder

Team information
- Current team: Real Madrid B
- Number: 10

Youth career
- 2010–2014: Torredembarra
- 2014–2017: Reus
- 2017–2019: Espanyol
- 2019–2024: Real Madrid

Senior career*
Years	Team	Apps	(Gls)
2024	Real Madrid C	7	(2)
2024–	Real Madrid B	66	(9)

International career^{‡}
2019–2020	Spain U15	6	(1)
2022	Spain U17	7	(1)
2022–2023	Spain U18	6	(4)
2023–2024	Spain U19	8	(2)
Medal record
Men's football
Representing Spain
UEFA European Under-19 Championship
Winner	2024 Northern Ireland
- * Club domestic league appearances and goals as of 8 September 2026 ‡ National team caps and goals as of 03:17, 29 August 2025 (UTC)

Pol Fortuny Albareda (born 11 March 2005) is a Spanish footballer who plays as a midfielder for Real Madrid Castilla.

== Club career ==
Fortuny joined the youth academy of Spanish La Liga side Real Madrid at the age of fourteen.

On 1 July 2024, Fortuny was promoted to the club's C team. The same year, he was promoted to Castilla.

== International career ==
Fortuny is a Spain youth international, debuted for the Spain U19 during a 3-0 win over Norway U19.

He was later called up for the 2024 UEFA European Under-19 Championship in Northern Ireland. In the semi-final, he scored the only goal in Spain’s 1–0 victory over Italy U19, helping the team reach the final. He was on the bench in the final when Spain went on to win the tournament by defeating France U19 2–0, secured their 12th UEFA European Under-19 Championship title.

== Style of play ==
Fortuny has been described as "his versatility in attack makes him an unpredictable footballer. He is capable of playing on the right wing, on the inside, as a midfielder, as a midfielder, and... has the characteristics to be able to play as a false nine despite his height... shown to have an unusual sense of goal so as not to be a pure finisher".

== Career statistics ==
As of match played 8 September 2026

Appearances and goals by club, season and competition
Club	Season	League			Other		Total	
Club	Season	Division	Apps	Goals	Apps	Goals	Apps	Goals
Real Madrid C	2023–24	Tercera Federación	3	0	—		3	0
Real Madrid C	2024–25	Segunda Federación	4	2	—		4	2
Real Madrid C	Total		7	2	0	0	7	2
Real Madrid Castilla	2024–25	Primera Federación	31	1	—		31	1
Real Madrid Castilla	2025–26	Primera Federación	35	8	—		35	8
Real Madrid Castilla	Total		66	9	0	0	66	9
Career total			73	11	0	0	73	11

== Honours ==
Spain U19

- UEFA European Under-19 Championship: 2024
