= Luca Di Maggio =

Italian footballer

Personal information
- Date of birth: 31 March 2005 (age 21)
- Place of birth: Segrate, Italy
- Position: Midfielder

Team information
- Current team: Avellino

Youth career
- –2024: Inter Milan

Senior career*
Years	Team	Apps	(Gls)
2024–2026	Inter Milan	0	(0)
2024–2025	→ Perugia (loan)	21	(3)
2025–2026	→ Padova (loan)	28	(3)
2026–	Avellino	0	(0)

International career^{‡}
2019	Italy U15	3	(2)
2021–2022	Italy U17	18	(5)
2022–2023	Italy U18	4	(0)
2022–2024	Italy U19	18	(2)
2024–2026	Italy U20	7	(0)
- * Club domestic league appearances and goals as of 13 May 2026 ‡ National team caps and goals as of 27 March 2026

Luca Di Maggio (born 31 March 2005) is an Italian professional footballer who plays as a midfielder for Serie B club Avellino.

== Club career ==
Di Maggio started his career in Inter Milan's youth academy. On 9 August 2024, Di Maggio joined Serie C club Perugia on a season-long loan. Two days later, Di Maggio made his professional debut, coming on as a substitute in the Coppa Italia Serie C fixture against Latina.

On 1 August 2025, Di Maggio moved on loan to Padova in Serie B.

On 14 July 2026, Di Maggio joined Serie B club Avellino, signing a contract until 2030.

== International career ==
Di Maggio is an Italian youth international.

In May 2022, Di Maggio took part in the 2022 UEFA European Under-17 Championship, in which Italy got eliminated in the quarter-finals, making four appearances and scoring one goal.

In July 2024, Di Maggio participated in the 2024 UEFA European Under-19 Championship, making four appearances and scoring one goal. His good performances granted him a spot on the Team of the Tournament.

== Style of playing ==
Described as a modern mezzala, Di Maggio is praised for his workrate, determination, attacking runs and shooting abilities. He cites Nicolò Barella as his main inspiration.

== Honours ==
Individual

- UEFA European Under-19 Championship Team of the Tournament: 2024
