= Justin Bengui =

French footballer (born 2005)

Personal information
- Full name: Justin Bengui João
- Date of birth: 9 July 2005 (age 21)
- Place of birth: Montbéliard, France
- Height: 1.90 m (6 ft 3 in)
- Position: Goalkeeper

Team information
- Current team: Lyon
- Number: 25

Youth career
- 2012–2016: Villefranche
- 2016–2022: Lyon

Senior career*
Years	Team	Apps	(Gls)
2022–	Lyon B	19	(0)
2023–	Lyon	0	(0)
2025	→ Jedinstvo Ub (loan)	12	(0)
2025–2026	→ RWDM Brussels (loan)	8	(0)

International career^{‡}
2021	France U17	1	(0)
2022–2023	France U18	6	(0)
2023–2024	France U19	11	(0)
2025–	France U20	4	(0)
Medal record
Men's football
Representing France
UEFA European Under-19 Championship
Runner-up	2024 Northern Ireland
- * Club domestic league appearances and goals as of 20 April 2026 ‡ National team caps and goals as of 19 October 2025

Justin Bengui João (born 9 July 2005) is a French professional footballer who plays as a goalkeeper for Ligue 1 club Lyon.

== Club career ==
Born in Montbéliard, Bengui started his career at Villefranche and remained there until 2016, when he joined the youth side of Lyon. On 28 July 2021, despite interest from Bayern Munich, he decided to sign his first professional contract with Lyon for a period of three seasons.

In 2022, he was part of the Lyon team that won the Coupe Gambardella, being the substitute goalkeeper for Mathieu Patouillet. In the same year, he made his senior debut for the reserves in a 0–4 Championnat National 2 defeat against Lyon La Duchère

On 14 July 2023, Bengui appeared with the senior team for the first time, playing in a in the friendly game against De Treffers.

On 20 January 2025, Bengui joined Jedinstvo Ub in Serbia on loan.

On 23 July 2025, Bengui was loaned to Lyon's sister club RWDM Brussels on a one-season loan deal.

== International career ==
Bengui represented France at youth level, and is also eligible to represent Angola. In July 2024, he was named in France U19's squad for the 2024 UEFA European Under-19 Championship. As the starter goalkeeper for the team, he appeared in 4 games during the tournament, including the final against Spain, where France was defeated by the score of 0–2.

== Career statistics ==
As of match played 1 February 2026

Appearances and goals by club, season and competition
Club	Season	League			Cup		Europe		Other		Total	
Club	Season	Division	Apps	Goals	Apps	Goals	Apps	Goals	Apps	Goals	Apps	Goals
Lyon B	2021–21	CFA	1	0	—		—		—		1	0
Lyon B	2022–23	CFA	10	0	—		—		—		10	0
Lyon B	2023–24	CFA	8	0	—		—		3 (Note: Appearances in Premier League Cup)	0	11	0
Lyon B	Total		19	0	—		—		3	0	22	0
Lyon	2023–24	Ligue 1	0	0	0	0	0	0	—		0	0
Lyon	2026–27	Ligue 1	0	0	0	0	0	0	—		0	0
Lyon	Total		0	0	0	0	0	0	—		0	0
Jedinstvo Ub (loan)	2024–25	Serbian SuperLiga	12	0	—		—		—		12	0
RWDM Brussels (loan)	2025–26	Challenger Pro League	8	0	0	0	—		—		8	0
Career total			39	0	0	0	0	0	3	0	42	0

== Honours ==
France U19

- UEFA European Under-19 Championship runner-up: 2024

France U20

- Maurice Revello Tournament: 2025
