= Jan Koutný (footballer) =

Czech footballer (born 2004)

Personal information
- Date of birth: 14 October 2004 (age 22)
- Place of birth: Czech Republic
- Height: 1.97 m (6 ft 6 in)
- Position: Goalkeeper

Team information
- Current team: Sigma Olomouc
- Number: 91

Youth career
- 2011–2013: Sokol Velký Týnec
- 2013–2015: Olomouc
- 2015–2019: Sigma Olomouc
- 2019–2021: Šumperk
- 2021: Sigma Olomouc

Senior career*
Years	Team	Apps	(Gls)
2021–	Sigma Olomouc	29	(0)
2021–2024	→ Sigma Olomouc B	15	(0)

International career^{‡}
2024	Czech Republic U20	3	(0)
2025–	Czech Republic U21	7	(0)
- * Club domestic league appearances and goals as of 13 June 2026 ‡ National team caps and goals as of 13 June 2026

Jan Koutný (Czech: [jan kou̯tniː]; born 14 October 2004) is a Czech footballer who plays as a goalkeeper for Czech First League club Sigma Olomouc and the Czech Republic under-21 national team.

== Early life ==
Koutný was born on 14 October 2004. He started playing youth football for Sokol Velký Týnec aged seven, before moving to 1. HFK Olomouc's academy at the age if nine. Two years later, he joined Sigma Olomouc, then moved to FK Šumperk for three years before returning to Sigma Olomouc.

== Club career ==
=== Sigma Olomouc ===
Upon returning to Sigma Olomouc's academy, Koutný became part of the club's B-team in the Moravian-Silesian Football League (MSFL), SK Sigma Olomouc B. He made his debut on 17 October 2021, coming on as a substitute for Tadeáš Stoppen in a 5–1 home win over SFK Vrchovina at Andrův Stadion. However, after the club earnt promotion to the Czech National Football League, he did not play again until 7 October 2023, when he started and played the entirety of a 6–2 away loss to Silon Táborsko. By the end of the 2023–24 season, he had become the club's starting goalkeeper. He played his final game for the B-team on 20 July 2024 at the start of the 2024–25 season, playing the entirety of a 3–0 loss away to Chrudim. In total, he made 15 appearances for the B-team.

Koutný was promoted to Sigma Olomouc's first team in the Czech First League during the 2024–25 season, being the second choice goalkeeper after Tadeáš Stoppen. Due to Stoppen's absence, he made his first team debut on 28 July 2024, playing the entirety of a 1–1 away draw with Slovan Liberec. He played a total of 27 games in all competitions throughout the 2024–25 season (23 in the league and four in the Czech Cup), keeping a total of seven clean sheets.

In the 2025–26 season, Koutný became Sigma Olomouc's starting goalkeeper. During the season, he extended his contract with the club until 2029. On 21 August 2025, he made his European debut, playing the entirety of the first leg of the club's UEFA Europa League playoff round tie against Swedish side Malmö FF away, which Malmö won 3–0. In total, he made 41 appearances in all competitions (31 in the league and 10 in the UEFA Conference League) across the season, keeping a total of 10 clean sheets (nine in the league and one in the Conference League).

== International career ==
Koutný began playing for the Czech Republic in 2024. He has represented the country at under-20 and under-21 level.

Koutný made his début for the under-20 national team on 10 September 2024, playing the entirety of a 0–0 home draw in a friendly against Turkey in Kroměříž, Czech Republic.

Koutný was named by manager Jan Suchopárek in his 23-player squad for the 2025 UEFA European Under-21 Championship in Slovakia from 11 to 28 June 2025. He did not feature in any of the matches, however, and the Czech Republic were eliminated in the group stage.

Koutný was listed by manager Miroslav Koubek in the senior national team's preliminary 54-player squad for the 2026 FIFA World Cup. However, he was omitted from the 29-player squad and thus ultimately did not make the final 26-player squad.
