= Emir Bars =

Turkish footballer (born 2005)

Personal information
- Date of birth: 11 April 2005 (age 21)
- Place of birth: Helmond, Netherlands
- Height: 1.80 m (5 ft 11 in)
- Position: Midfielder

Team information
- Current team: Konyaspor
- Number: 45

Youth career
- 2013: Helmondia
- 2013–2023: PSV Eindhoven

Senior career*
Years	Team	Apps	(Gls)
2023–2025	Jong PSV	60	(5)
2025–	Konyaspor	2	(0)
2025–2026	→ Vanspor (loan)	23	(2)

International career^{‡}
2021–2022	Turkey U17	6	(0)
2022–2023	Turkey U18	3	(0)
2023–2024	Turkey U19	11	(0)
2024	Turkey U20	4	(0)
2025	Turkey U21	2	(0)
- * Club domestic league appearances and goals as of 17 October 2026 ‡ National team caps and goals as of 25 March 2025

Emir Bars (born 11 April 2005) is a footballer who plays as a midfielder for Turkish Süper Lig club Konyaspor. Born in the Netherlands, he is a youth international for Turkey.

== Early life ==
Bars was a youth player at SC Helmondia before joining PSV at the age of six.

== Club career ==
Originally being playing as a defender, Bars was converted to more of an attacking role by the coaches at PSV. In a 2024 interview, he said "It doesn't matter to me where I play, as long as I can show my attacking qualities." He signed his first professional contract with PSV in June 2022.

== International career ==
Bars has represented Turkey at under-17, under-18 and under-19 level.

== Career statistics ==
As of match played 12 April 2024

Appearances and goals by club, season and competition
Club	Season	League			Cup		Continental		Other		Total	
Club	Season	Division	Apps	Goals	Apps	Goals	Apps	Goals	Apps	Goals	Apps	Goals
Jong PSV	2023–24	Eerste Divisie	24	2	—		—		—		24	2
Career total			24	2	0	0	0	0	0	0	24	2
