= Vladyslav Krapyvtsov =

Ukrainian footballer (born 2005)

Personal information
- Full name: Vladyslav Andriyovych Krapyvtsov
- Date of birth: 25 June 2005 (age 21)
- Place of birth: Kharkiv, Ukraine
- Height: 1.88 m (6 ft 2 in)
- Position: Goalkeeper

Team information
- Current team: Girona
- Number: 25

Youth career
- 2014–2018: Metalist Kharkiv
- 2018–2022: Dnipro
- 2022–2024: Dnipro-1

Senior career*
Years	Team	Apps	(Gls)
2025–	Girona	5	(0)

International career^{‡}
2024	Ukraine U19	7	(0)
2025	Ukraine U20	5	(0)
2025–	Ukraine U21	5	(0)
- * Club domestic league appearances and goals as of 12 October 2026 ‡ National team caps and goals as of 2 October 2026

Vladyslav Andriyovych Krapyvtsov (Ukrainian: Владислав Андрійович Крапивцов; born 25 June 2005) is a Ukrainian professional footballer who plays as a goalkeeper for Segunda División club Girona.

== Club career ==
Born in Kharkiv, Krapyvtsov began his career with Metalist Kharkiv in 2014. He later played for FC Dnipro and SC Dnipro-1, leaving the latter in 2024 after the club was dissolved.

In October 2024, Krapyvtsov was due to sign for Chelsea, but the deal fell through after the club was unable to register any non-EU players. Late in the month, he also had a trial at Arsenal, before moving to Girona in the following month, also on trial.

On 12 December 2024, Girona officially announced the signing of Krapyvtsov on a contract until 2029. The following February (2025), he was registered in the first team, receiving the number 25 jersey and becoming a third-choice behind Paulo Gazzaniga and Juan Carlos.

Krapyvtsov made his professional – and La Liga – debut on 18 May 2025, starting in a 2–3 away loss to Real Sociedad.

== International career ==
Krapyvtsov played for the Ukraine national under-19 team in the 2024 UEFA European Under-19 Championship, being named in the team of the tournament.

== Career statistics ==
As of match played 27 October 2026

Appearances and goals by club, season and competition
Club	Season	League			Copa del Rey		Europe		Other		Total	
Club	Season	Division	Apps	Goals	Apps	Goals	Apps	Goals	Apps	Goals	Apps	Goals
Girona	2024–25	La Liga	2	0	—		—		—		2	0
Girona	2025–26	La Liga	2	0	1	0	—		—		3	0
Girona	2026–27	Segunda División	1	0	1	0	—		—		2	0
Girona	Total		5	0	2	0	—		—		7	0
Career total			5	0	2	0	0	0	0	0	7	0

== Honours ==
Individual

- UEFA European Under-19 Championship Team of the Tournament: 2024
