= 2022 UEFA European Under-17 Championship qualification =

Tournament details
- Dates: Qualifying round: 23 September – 16 November 2021; Elite round: Spring 2022
- Teams: 54 (from 1 confederation)

Tournament statistics
- Matches played: 123
- Goals scored: 427 (3.47 per match)
- Top scorer: (Germany) Dženan Pejčinović (8 goals)

The 2022 UEFA European Under-17 Championship qualifying competition was a men's under-17 football competition that determined the 15 teams joining the automatically qualified hosts Israel in the 2022 UEFA European Under-17 Championship final tournament. Players born on or after 1 January 2005 were eligible to participate.

Apart from Israel as the host, the remaining 54 teams entered the qualifying competition, where the original format consisted of two rounds: Qualifying round, which took place in autumn of 2021, and Elite round, which took place in spring of 2022.

== Format ==
The qualifying competition would originally consist of the following two rounds:

- Qualifying round: Apart from Netherlands and Spain, which receive byes to the elite round as the teams with the highest seeding coefficient, the remaining 52 teams are drawn into 13 groups of four teams. Each group is played in single round-robin format at one of the teams selected as hosts after the draw. The 13 group winners, the 13 runners-up, and the four third-placed teams with the best record against the first and second-placed teams in their group advance to the elite round.
- Elite round: The 32 teams are drawn into eight groups of four teams. Each group is played in single round-robin format at one of the teams selected as hosts after the draw. The eight group winners and the seven runners-up with the best record against all teams in their group qualify for the final tournament.

The schedule of each group is as follows, with two rest days between each matchday (Regulations Article 20.04):

Group schedule
Matchday	Matches
Matchday 1	1 v 4, 3 v 2
Matchday 2	1 v 3, 2 v 4
Matchday 3	2 v 1, 4 v 3

=== Tiebreakers ===
In the qualifying round and elite round, teams are ranked according to points (3 points for a win, 1 point for a draw, 0 points for a loss), and if tied on points, the following tiebreaking criteria are applied, in the order given, to determine the rankings (Regulations Articles 14.01 and 14.02):

1. Points in head-to-head matches among tied teams;
2. Goal difference in head-to-head matches among tied teams;
3. Goals scored in head-to-head matches among tied teams;
4. If more than two teams are tied, and after applying all head-to-head criteria above, a subset of teams are still tied, all head-to-head criteria above are reapplied exclusively to this subset of teams;
5. Goal difference in all group matches;
6. Goals scored in all group matches;
7. Penalty shoot-out if only two teams have the same number of points, and they met in the last round of the group and are tied after applying all criteria above (not used if more than two teams have the same number of points, or if their rankings are not relevant for qualification for the next stage);
8. Disciplinary points (red card = 3 points, yellow card = 1 point, expulsion for two yellow cards in one match = 3 points);
9. UEFA coefficient ranking for the qualifying round draw;
10. Drawing of lots.

To determine the four best third-placed teams from the qualifying round, the results against the teams in fourth place are discarded. The following criteria are applied (Regulations Articles 15.01 and 15.03):

1. Points;
2. Goal difference;
3. Goals scored;
4. Disciplinary points (total 3 matches);
5. UEFA coefficient ranking for the qualifying round draw;
6. Drawing of lots.

To determine the seven best runners-up from the elite round, all results are considered. The same criteria as above are applied (Regulations Articles 15.02 and 15.03).

== Qualifying round ==
=== Draw ===
The draw for the qualifying round was held on 9 December 2020, 10:00 CET (UTC+1), at the UEFA headquarters in Nyon, Switzerland.

The teams were seeded according to their coefficient ranking, calculated based on the following:

- 2016 UEFA European Under-17 Championship final tournament and qualifying competition (qualifying round and elite round)
- 2017 UEFA European Under-17 Championship final tournament and qualifying competition (qualifying round and elite round)
- 2018 UEFA European Under-17 Championship final tournament and qualifying competition (qualifying round and elite round)
- 2019 UEFA European Under-17 Championship final tournament and qualifying competition (qualifying round and elite round)

Each group contained one team from Pot A, one team from Pot B, one team from Pot C, and one team from Pot D. Based on the decisions taken by the UEFA Emergency Panel, the following pairs of teams could not be drawn in the same group: Serbia and Kosovo, Bosnia and Herzegovina and Kosovo, Azerbaijan and Armenia.

Final tournament hosts
Team	Coeff.	Rank
**Israel**	11.167	—

Bye to elite round
Team	Coeff.	Rank
Netherlands	28.556	1
Spain	27.444	2

Teams entering qualifying round

Pot A
Team	Coeff.	Rank
**England**	23.056	3
**Italy**	22.667	4
**Portugal**	20.722	5
**Germany**	19.833	6
**France**	18.944	7
**Belgium**	18.556	8
**Republic of Ireland**	16.833	9
**Sweden**	15.278	10
**Hungary**	14.389	11
Austria	13.556	12
**Serbia**	13.278	13
**Turkey**	12.667	14
**Bosnia and Herzegovina**	12.333	15

Pot B
Team	Coeff.	Rank
**Scotland**	12.000	16
**Ukraine**	11.889	17
**Czech Republic**	11.722	18
**Switzerland**	11.111	19
**Denmark**	11.000	20
Norway	10.722	21
**Russia**	10.667	22
**Greece**	10.222	23
**Slovenia**	10.111	24
**Poland**	10.000	25
Croatia	9.833	26
**Slovakia**	9.333	27
Iceland	8.167	28

Pot C
Team	Coeff.	Rank
**Finland**	7.833	29
Cyprus	6.167	30
Belarus	5.500	31
Romania	5.333	32
Azerbaijan	5.333	33
North Macedonia	4.833	34
Montenegro	4.667	35
**Wales**	4.500	36
**Georgia**	4.333	37
Northern Ireland	4.167	38
**Bulgaria**	4.000	39
**Latvia**	3.000	40
Faroe Islands	2.889	41

Pot D
Team	Coeff.	Rank
Lithuania	2.667	42
Albania	2.333	43
**Estonia**	2.333	44
Armenia	2.000	45
Kazakhstan	2.000	46
**Kosovo**	2.000	47
Andorra	1.333	48
Liechtenstein	1.000	49
Moldova	0.667	50
**Luxembourg**	0.667	51
San Marino	0.333	52
Malta	0.000	53
Gibraltar	0.000	54

Notes

- Teams marked in **bold** have qualified for the final tournament.

=== Groups ===
The qualifying round is scheduled to be played by 16 November 2021.

Times up to 27 March 2022 are CET (UTC+1), thereafter times are CEST (UTC+2), as listed by UEFA (local times, if different, are in parentheses).

==== Group 1 ====
Pos	Team	Pld	W	D	L	GF	GA	GD	Pts	Qualification
1	Turkey	3	2	1	0	10	4	+6	**7 (Note: Turkey ahead of Denmark on penalty shoot-out)**	Elite round
2	Denmark	3	2	1	0	10	4	+6	**7**	Elite round
3	Montenegro	3	1	0	2	3	3	0	**3**	
4	Malta (H)	3	0	0	3	2	14	−12	**0**	

Source: UEFA
Rules for classification: Tiebreakers
(H) Hosts
Notes:

6 October 2021
11:00

Turkey	6–1	Malta
Kılıçsoy 15', 78'; Acar 32', 90+2'; Güler 37', 57'	Report	Barbara 67'

Hibernians Stadium, Paola
Referee: Robertas Valikonis (Lithuania)
6 October 2021
16:00

Montenegro	0–2	Denmark
	Report	Sertdemir 47' (pen.), 53'

Hibernians Stadium, Paola
Referee: Ion Orlic (Moldova)

9 October 2021
11:00

Turkey	1–0	Montenegro
Kılıçsoy 7'	Report

Hibernians Stadium, Paola
Referee: Christian-Petru Ciochirca (Austria)
9 October 2021
16:00

Denmark	5–1	Malta
Böndergaard 10'; Vella 23' (o.g.); Xerri 49' (o.g.); Sertdemir 84'; Beck 90+3'	Report	Barbara 30'

Hibernians Stadium, Paola
Referee: Robertas Valikonis (Lithuania)

12 October 2021
11:00

Denmark	3–3	Turkey
Hansborg 23'; Sertdemir 37'; Sahsah 45'	Report	Kayali 7'; Bülbül 33'; Kılıçsoy 69'
Penalties
Sertdemir (penalty scored); Höjlund (penalty scored); Bakhit (penalty scored); Beck (penalty scored); Munck (penalty scored); Sahsah (penalty missed)	5–6	Yildiz (penalty scored); Yöntem (penalty scored); Bülbül (penalty scored); Güler (penalty scored); Kılıçsoy (penalty scored); Celik (penalty scored)

Hibernians Stadium, Paola
Referee: Christian-Petru Ciochirca (Austria)
12 October 2021
16:00

Malta	0–3	Montenegro
	Report	Roganović 54'; Bubanja 61'; Mrvaljević 90+5'

Hibernians Stadium, Paola
Referee: Ion Orlic (Moldova)

==== Group 2 ====
Pos	Team	Pld	W	D	L	GF	GA	GD	Pts	Qualification
1	Czech Republic	3	2	1	0	7	2	+5	**7**	Elite round
2	Sweden	3	1	2	0	12	4	+8	**5**	Elite round
3	Latvia (H)	3	1	1	1	6	4	+2	**4**	Elite round
4	Lithuania	3	0	0	3	1	16	−15	**0**	

Source: UEFA
Rules for classification: Tiebreakers
(H) Hosts
23 September 2021
12:00 13:00 (EEST)

Sweden	8–0	Lithuania
Kanga 1'; Bardagji 5'; Nissen 9', 32', 43'; Ayari 37'; Bazys 82' (o.g.); Madjed 90+1'	Report

SB Arkadija, Riga
Referee: Henrik Nalbandyan (Armenia)
23 September 2021
15:00 16:00 (EEST)

Latvia	0–1	Czech Republic
	Report	Remiáš 32'

Zemgale Olympic Center, Jelgava
Referee: Visar Kastrati (Kosovo)

26 September 2021
12:00 13:00 (EEST)

Czech Republic	4–0	Lithuania
Planka 25'; Pudil 71'; Buryán 73', 77' (pen.)	Report

SB Arkadija, Riga
Referee: Henrik Nalbandyan (Armenia)

29 September 2021
15:00 16:00 (EEST)

Czech Republic	2–2	Sweden
Buryán 11' (pen.); Ayari 52' (o.g.)	Report	Bardagji 22', 90+5' (pen.)

SB Arkadija, Riga
Referee: Igor Pajac (Croatia)

31 October 2021
12:00 13:00 (EET)

Lithuania	1–4	Latvia
Kangars 6' (o.g.)	Report	Kangars 24' (pen.), 54'; Patrikejevs 73'; Sedols 83'

Zemgale Olympic Center, Jelgava
Referee: Visar Kastrati (Kosovo)

23 November 2021
18:00 CET

Sweden	2–2	Latvia
Tannor 9'; Kanga 14'	Report	Evelons 61'; Boroduška 75'

Bravida Arena, Gothenburg
Referee: Igor Pajac (Croatia)

==== Group 3 ====
Pos	Team	Pld	W	D	L	GF	GA	GD	Pts	Qualification
1	Luxembourg	3	2	1	0	6	2	+4	**7**	Elite round
2	Belgium (H)	3	2	0	1	5	1	+4	**6**	Elite round
3	Norway	3	1	1	1	5	4	+1	**4**	
4	Azerbaijan	3	0	0	3	0	9	−9	**0**	

Source: UEFA
Rules for classification: Tiebreakers
(H) Hosts

All matches were abandoned by Azerbaijan. All opponents received a 3–0 win.

6 October 2021
11:00

Azerbaijan	0–3 (awarded)	Norway
	Report

National Training Centre Tubize, Tubize
Referee: Haris Kaljanac (Bosnia and Herzegovina)
6 October 2021
18:00

Belgium	0–1	Luxembourg
	Report	Flick 84'

National Training Centre Tubize, Tubize
Referee: Nikolas Neokleous (Cyprus)

9 October 2021
11:00

Norway	2–2	Luxembourg
Faraas 2'; Nusa 19' (pen.)	Report	Videira 55'; Luis 79'

National Training Centre Tubize, Tubize
Referee: Nikolas Neokleous (Cyprus)
9 October 2021
18:00

Belgium	3–0 (awarded)	Azerbaijan
	Report

National Training Centre Tubize, Tubize
Referee: Vitor Ferreira (Portugal)

12 October 2021
16:00

Luxembourg	3–0 (awarded)	Azerbaijan
	Report

Stade Leburton, Tubize
Referee: Haris Kaljanac (Bosnia and Herzegovina)
12 October 2021
16:00

Norway	0–2	Belgium
	Report	Kinsiona 65'; Talbi 68'

National Training Centre Tubize, Tubize
Referee: Vitor Ferreira (Portugal)

==== Group 4 ====
Pos	Team	Pld	W	D	L	GF	GA	GD	Pts	Qualification
1	Estonia	3	2	0	1	3	4	−1	**6**	Elite round
2	Georgia	3	1	1	1	2	2	0	**4**	Elite round
3	Hungary (H)	3	1	1	1	3	1	+2	**4**	Elite round
4	Iceland	3	0	2	1	2	3	−1	**2**	

Source: UEFA
Rules for classification: Tiebreakers
(H) Hosts
22 October 2021
17:00

Hungary	3–0	Estonia
Szűcs 23'; Barkóczi 45'; Lisztes 54'	Report

Globall Football Park, Telki
Referee: Snir Levy (Israel)
22 October 2021
17:00

Georgia	1–1	Iceland
Alibegashvili 41'	Report	Gudjohnsen 81'

Budaörsi Városi Stadion, Budaörs
Referee: Viktor Shimusik (Belarus)

25 October 2021
17:00

Hungary	0–1	Georgia
	Report	Narimanidze 86'

Globall Football Park, Telki
Referee: Abdulkadir Bitigen (Turkey)
25 October 2021
17:00

Iceland	1–2	Estonia
Campbell 10'	Report	Mustmaa 43'; Dikajev 47'

Bicskei Sportpálya, Bicske
Referee: Snir Levy (Israel)

28 October 2021
17:00

Iceland	0–0	Hungary
	Report

Globall Football Park, Telki
Referee: Abdulkadir Bitigen (Turkey)
28 October 2021
17:00

Estonia	1–0	Georgia
Jepihhin 33'	Report

Bicskei Sportpálya, Bicske
Referee: Viktor Shimusik (Belarus)

==== Group 5 ====
Pos	Team	Pld	W	D	L	GF	GA	GD	Pts	Qualification
1	Republic of Ireland (H)	3	2	1	0	9	2	+7	**7**	Elite round
2	Poland	3	1	2	0	3	2	+1	**5**	Elite round
3	North Macedonia	3	1	1	1	6	2	+4	**4**	
4	Andorra	3	0	0	3	0	12	−12	**0**	

Source: UEFA
Rules for classification: Tiebreakers
(H) Hosts
7 October 2021
15:00 14:00 (IST)

North Macedonia	0–0	Poland
	Report

Mardyke, Cork
Referee: Adam Ladebäck (Sweden)
7 October 2021
20:00 19:00 (IST)

Republic of Ireland	5–0	Andorra
Ferizaj 13'; O'Mahony 59'; Zefi 69'; Curtis 74'; Vata 76'	Report

Turner's Cross, Cork
Referee: Joonas Jaanovits (Estonia)

10 October 2021
15:00 14:00 (IST)

Poland	1–0	Andorra
Dziuba 47'	Report

Mardyke, Cork
Referee: Sigurd Kringstad (Norway)
10 October 2021
20:00 19:00 (IST)

Republic of Ireland	2–0	North Macedonia
Vata 31'; O'Mahony 73'	Report

Turner's Cross, Cork
Referee: Adam Ladebäck (Sweden)

13 October 2021
14:00 13:00 (IST)

Andorra	0–6	North Macedonia
	Report	Acosta 9' (o.g.); Nazifi 38' (pen.), 87'; Stojanov 48' (pen.), 65'; Gjorgievski 68' (pen.)

Mardyke, Cork
Referee: Joonas Jaanovits (Estonia)
13 October 2021
14:00 13:00 (IST)

Poland	2–2	Republic of Ireland
Sławiński 12' (pen.), 20'	Report	O'Mahony 27'; Ferizaj 61'

Turner's Cross, Cork
Referee: Sigurd Kringstad (Norway)

==== Group 6 ====
Pos	Team	Pld	W	D	L	GF	GA	GD	Pts	Qualification
1	Germany	3	3	0	0	18	1	+17	**9**	Elite round
2	Russia	3	2	0	1	9	3	+6	**6**	Elite round
3	Romania (H)	3	1	0	2	5	7	−2	**3**	
4	San Marino	3	0	0	3	1	22	−21	**0**	

Source: UEFA
Rules for classification: Tiebreakers
(H) Hosts
20 October 2021
14:00 15:00 (EEST)

Germany	11–0	San Marino
Pejčinović 2', 36', 47', 72'; Ibrahimović 7'; Bischof 18', 40', 77'; Wanner 51'; Krattenmacher 64'; García Posadas 66'	Report

Stadionul CNAF, Buftea
Referee: Ashot Ghaltakhchyan (Armenia)
20 October 2021
18:00 19:00 (EEST)

Romania	0–2	Russia
	Report	Kozlov 38'; Komissarov 90+3'

Stadionul Mogoșoaia, Mogoșoaia
Referee: Jasmin Sabotic (Luxembourg)

23 October 2021
14:00 15:00 (EEST)

Russia	6–1	San Marino
Komissarov 8'; Kozlov 20'; Glebov 52', 73', 78'; Ofitserov 71'	Report	Renzi 81'

Stadionul CNAF, Buftea
Referee: Ashot Ghaltakhchyan (Armenia)
23 October 2021
18:00 19:00 (EEST)

Germany	5–0	Romania
Ulrich 21'; Pejcinovic 60', 79', 82'; Wanner 88'	Report

Stadionul Mogoșoaia, Mogoșoaia
Referee: David Munro (Scotland)

26 October 2021
17:00 18:00 (EEST)

Russia	1–2	Germany
Baranovsky 25'	Report	Weiper 73'; Ibrahimović 86'

Stadionul CNAF, Buftea
Referee: David Munro (Scotland)
26 October 2021
17:00 18:00 (EEST)

San Marino	0–5	Romania
	Report	Moraru 43'; Borza 45+2', 54'; Sali 81'; Caragea 85'

Stadionul Mogoșoaia, Mogoșoaia
Referee: Jasmin Sabotic (Luxembourg)

==== Group 7 ====
Pos	Team	Pld	W	D	L	GF	GA	GD	Pts	Qualification
1	Switzerland	3	2	1	0	9	1	+8	**7**	Elite round
2	Finland (H)	3	1	2	0	6	2	+4	**5**	Elite round
3	Bosnia and Herzegovina	3	1	1	1	7	3	+4	**4**	Elite round
4	Gibraltar	3	0	0	3	1	17	−16	**0**	

Source: UEFA
Rules for classification: Tiebreakers
(H) Hosts
7 October 2021
12:00 13:00 (EEST)

Bosnia and Herzegovina	6–1	Gibraltar
Zahirović 19'; Prusina 23'; Lamadžema 66'; Pramenković 89'; Damjanić 90'; Misimović 90+3'	Report	Bartolo 59'

Myyrmäki Stadium, Vantaa
Referee: Ishmael Barbara (Malta)
7 October 2021
18:00 19:00 (EEST)

Finland	1–1	Switzerland
Jalonen 82'	Report	Demiri 16'

Myyrmäki Stadium, Vantaa
Referee: Elchin Masiyev (Azerbaijan)

10 October 2021
12:00 13:00 (EEST)

Switzerland	7–0	Gibraltar
Asllani 20'; Frokaj 47', 82'; Bajrami 49'; Krasniqi 56'; Di Giusto 64', 90+1'	Report

Myyrmäki Stadium, Vantaa
Referee: Ishmael Barbara (Malta)
10 October 2021
18:00 19:00 (EEST)

Bosnia and Herzegovina	1–1	Finland
Pramenković 21'	Report	Hänninen 56'

Myyrmäki Stadium, Vantaa
Referee: Sebastian Gishamer (Austria)

13 October 2021
13:00 14:00 (EEST)

Switzerland	1–0	Bosnia and Herzegovina
Bajrami 3'	Report

Bolt Arena, Helsinki
Referee: Sebastian Gishamer (Austria)
13 October 2021
13:00 14:00 (EEST)

Gibraltar	0–4	Finland
	Report	Lika 4'; Jalonen 41'; Armstrong 82'; Hudd 90+3'

Myyrmäki Stadium, Vantaa
Referee: Elchin Masiyev (Azerbaijan)

==== Group 8 ====
Pos	Team	Pld	W	D	L	GF	GA	GD	Pts	Qualification
1	Greece (H)	3	2	1	0	4	0	+4	**7**	Elite round
2	France	3	1	1	1	4	2	+2	**4**	Elite round
3	Cyprus	3	1	1	1	2	4	−2	**4**	
4	Moldova	3	0	1	2	0	4	−4	**1**	

Source: UEFA
Rules for classification: Tiebreakers
(H) Hosts
26 October 2021
13:00 14:00 (EEST)

France	3–0	Moldova
Saettel 20', 45'; Zidane 85'	Report

Katerini Municipal Stadium, Katerini
Referee: Georgi Davidov (Bulgaria)
26 October 2021
14:00 15:00 (EEST)

Cyprus	0–3	Greece
	Report	Kaloskamis 27'; Gkoumas 73'; Mavropoulos 81' (pen.)

Svoronos Municipal Stadium "Lazaros Xanthopoulos", Svoronos Pierias
Referee: Joni Hyytiä (Finland)

29 October 2021
13:00 14:00 (EEST)

France	1–1	Cyprus
Doué 12'	Report	Charalambous 90+4'

Katerini Municipal Stadium, Katerini
Referee: Sandi Putros (Denmark)
29 October 2021
14:00 15:00 (EEST)

Greece	0–0	Moldova
	Report

Svoronos Municipal Stadium "Lazaros Xanthopoulos", Svoronos Pierias
Referee: Georgi Davidov (Bulgaria)

1 November 2021
14:00 15:00 (EET)

Greece	1–0	France
Alexiou 75'	Report

Katerini Municipal Stadium, Katerini
Referee: Sandi Putros (Denmark)
1 November 2021
14:00 15:00 (EET)

Moldova	0–1	Cyprus
	Report	Savva 29'

Svoronos Municipal Stadium "Lazaros Xanthopoulos", Svoronos Pierias
Referee: Joni Hyytiä (Finland)

==== Group 9 ====
Pos	Team	Pld	W	D	L	GF	GA	GD	Pts	Qualification
1	Slovenia	3	3	0	0	13	0	+13	**9**	Elite round
2	Kosovo	3	2	0	1	2	1	+1	**6**	Elite round
3	Austria (H)	3	1	0	2	2	5	−3	**3**	
4	Faroe Islands	3	0	0	3	0	11	−11	**0**	

Source: UEFA
Rules for classification: Tiebreakers
(H) Hosts
6 October 2021
11:00

Faroe Islands	0–8	Slovenia
	Report	Čuber Potočnik 7', 23'; Čuk 19'; Ristić 42'; Bjarkhamar 65' (o.g.); Štricelj 70'; Kovačič 80', 85'

Lindabrunn stadium, Enzesfeld-Lindabrunn
Referee: Irakli Kvirikashvili (Georgia)
6 October 2021
18:30

Austria	0–1	Kosovo
	Report	Krasniqi 53'

Sport- und Freizeitzentrum Traiskirchen, Traiskirchen
Referee: Viktor Kopiievskyi (Ukraine)

9 October 2021
11:00

Slovenia	1–0	Kosovo
Ristić 68'	Report

Lindabrunn stadium, Enzesfeld-Lindabrunn
Referee: Viktor Kopiievskyi (Ukraine)
9 October 2021
18:30

Austria	2–0	Faroe Islands
Scharner 45' (pen.); Ibrahimoglu 75'	Report

Sport- und Freizeitzentrum Traiskirchen, Traiskirchen
Referee: Vassilis Fotias (Greece)

12 October 2021
15:30

Kosovo	1–0	Faroe Islands
Bllaca 59'	Report

Lindabrunn stadium, Enzesfeld-Lindabrunn
Referee: Irakli Kvirikashvili (Georgia)
12 October 2021
15:30

Slovenia	4–0	Austria
Potocnik 2' (pen.); Schöller 27' (o.g.); Čuk 40'; Stojinovic 50'	Report

Sport- und Freizeitzentrum Traiskirchen, Traiskirchen
Referee: Vassilis Fotias (Greece)

==== Group 10 ====
Pos	Team	Pld	W	D	L	GF	GA	GD	Pts	Qualification
1	Bulgaria	3	3	0	0	8	0	+8	**9**	Elite round
2	Serbia (H)	3	2	0	1	12	2	+10	**6**	Elite round
3	Croatia	3	1	0	2	3	2	+1	**3**	
4	Liechtenstein	3	0	0	3	0	19	−19	**0**	

Source: UEFA
Rules for classification: Tiebreakers
(H) Hosts
21 October 2021
12:00

Bulgaria	1–0	Croatia
Georgiev 18'	Report

Serbian FA Sports Center, Stara Pazova
Referee: Andrew Davey (Northern Ireland)
21 October 2021
18:00

Serbia	11–0	Liechtenstein
Šljivić 15', 36'; Bubanj 23', 51', 55'; Milošević 29', 53', 57'; Radonjić 76'; Nikolašević 86', 90'	Report

Serbian FA Sports Center, Stara Pazova
Referee: Philip Farrugia (Malta)

24 October 2021
12:00

Croatia	3–0	Liechtenstein
Ivković 14'; Weissenhofer 53' (o.g.); Košćević 84'	Report

Serbian FA Sports Center, Stara Pazova
Referee: Philip Farrugia (Malta)
24 October 2021
18:00

Serbia	0–2	Bulgaria
	Report	Raychev 60'; Mitkov 70'

Serbian FA Sports Center, Stara Pazova
Referee: Allard Lindhout (Netherlands)

27 October 2021
14:00

Croatia	0–1	Serbia
	Report	Bubanj 63'

Serbian FA Sports Center, Stara Pazova
Referee: Allard Lindhout (Netherlands)
27 October 2021
14:00

Liechtenstein	0–5	Bulgaria
	Report	Kirev 9', 38', 73'; Stoyanov 30'; Marinov 60'

Serbian FA Sports Center, Stara Pazova
Referee: Andrew Davey (Northern Ireland)

==== Group 11 ====
Pos	Team	Pld	W	D	L	GF	GA	GD	Pts	Qualification
1	Ukraine	3	2	0	1	7	5	+2	**6**	Elite round
2	Portugal (H)	3	2	0	1	9	3	+6	**6**	Elite round
3	Wales	3	1	1	1	4	4	0	**4**	Elite round
4	Kazakhstan	3	0	1	2	1	9	−8	**1**	

Source: UEFA
Rules for classification: Tiebreakers
(H) Hosts
10 November 2021
18:00 (17:00 (WET)

Portugal	5–0	Kazakhstan
Abdullayev 5', 40' (o.g.); Santos 47'; Rodrigues 49'; Veloso 56' (pen.)	Report

Estádio Algarve, Faro-Loule
Referee: Mileta Šćepanović (Montenegro)
10 November 2021
18:00 (17:00 (WET)

Wales	3–1	Ukraine
Harris 44'; Roberts 57'; Fleming 83'	Report	Balaba 76'

Estádio Municipal de Albufeira, Albufeira
Referee: Igor Stojchevski (North Macedonia)

13 November 2021
18:00 (17:00 (WET)

Portugal	2–0	Wales
Monteiro 18'; Riberio 86'	Report

Estádio Algarve, Faro-Loule
Referee: Christian-Petru Ciochirca (Austria)
13 November 2021
18:00 (17:00 (WET)

Ukraine	3–0	Kazakhstan
Husiev 45'; Mykytiuk 45+2'; Kremchanin 76'	Report

Estádio Municipal de Albufeira, Albufeira
Referee: Mileta Šćepanović (Montenegro)

16 November 2021
16:00 (15:00 (WET)

Ukraine	3–2	Portugal
Husiev 43'; Dzen 61'; Kremchanin 81'	Report	Gonçalves 13' (pen.); Rodrigues 57'

Estádio Algarve, Faro-Loule
Referee: Christian-Petru Ciochirca (Austria)
16 November 2021
16:00 (15:00 (WET)

Kazakhstan	1–1	Wales
Nurymbet 32'	Report	Benjamin 27'

Estádio Municipal de Albufeira, Albufeira
Referee: Igor Stojchevski (North Macedonia)

==== Group 12 ====
Pos	Team	Pld	W	D	L	GF	GA	GD	Pts	Qualification
1	Italy	3	3	0	0	10	0	+10	**9**	Elite round
2	Scotland	3	2	0	1	6	7	−1	**6**	Elite round
3	Northern Ireland (H)	3	0	1	2	4	7	−3	**1**	
4	Albania	3	0	1	2	4	10	−6	**1**	

Source: UEFA
Rules for classification: Tiebreakers
(H) Hosts
27 October 2021
16:00 15:00 (BST)

Northern Ireland	2–3	Scotland
McCallion 8'; Kellyman 40'	Report	Wilson 15', 87'; Sharpe 79'

Mourneview Park, Lurgan
Referee: Urs Schnyder (Switzerland)
27 October 2021
20:00 19:00 (BST)

Italy	5–0	Albania
Di Maggio 9'; Ciammaglichella 19'; Bruno 55'; Bolzan 64'; Marconi 66'	Report

Shamrock Park, Portadown
Referee: Ferenc Karakó (Hungary)

30 October 2021
16:00 15:00 (BST)

Italy	2–0	Northern Ireland
Carboni 48'; Marconi 90+3'	Report

Inver Park, Larne
Referee: Dario Bel (Croatia)
30 October 2021
20:00 19:00 (BST)

Scotland	3–2	Albania
Wilson 27'; Moore 60'; Allen 66'	Report	Kosmallari 12'; Kurti 90+1'

Seaview, Belfast
Referee: Ferenc Karakó (Hungary)

2 November 2021
16:00 15:00 (GMT)

Scotland	0–3	Italy
	Report	Di Maggio 31'; Carboni 50'; Bolzan 87'

Shamrock Park, Portadown
Referee: Dario Bel (Croatia)
2 November 2021
16:00 15:00 (GMT)

Albania	2–2	Northern Ireland
Ageja 34'; Haxhari 66'	Report	Boyd 52'; Kellyman 84'

The Oval, Belfast
Referee: Urs Schnyder (Switzerland)

==== Group 13 ====
Pos	Team	Pld	W	D	L	GF	GA	GD	Pts	Qualification
1	England	3	2	1	0	10	2	+8	**7**	Elite round
2	Slovakia	3	1	2	0	7	2	+5	**5**	Elite round
3	Belarus (H)	3	1	1	1	2	1	+1	**4**	
4	Armenia	3	0	0	3	0	14	−14	**0**	

Source: UEFA
Rules for classification: Tiebreakers
(H) Hosts
16 October 2021
14:00 15:00 (EEST)

England	7–0	Armenia
Avetisyan 23' (o.g.); Smith 37'; Tezgel 56'; Taylor 64'; Cozier-Duberry 77'; Donley 88' (pen.); Mainoo 89'	Report

Dinamo Stadium, Minsk
Attendance: 50
Referee: Milos Milanovic (Serbia)
16 October 2021
16:00 17:00 (EEST)

Belarus	0–0	Slovakia
	Report

Borisov Arena, Barysaw
Attendance: 82
Referee: Andrei Chivulete (Romania)

19 October 2021
14:00 15:00 (EEST)

Slovakia	5–0	Armenia
Svoboda 4', 40'; Rehus 25', 50'; Zahradnik 81'	Report

Traktor Stadium, Minsk
Attendance: 20
Referee: Milos Milanovic (Serbia)
19 October 2021
17:00 18:00 (EEST)

England	1–0	Belarus
Donley 27'	Report

Haradski Stadium, Barysaw
Attendance: 100
Referee: Ondřej Berka (Czech Republic)

22 October 2021
16:00 17:00 (EEST)

Slovakia	2–2	England
Rehus 22'; Zahradnik 40'	Report	Tezgel 71' (pen.); O'Reilly 88'

Borisov Arena, Barysaw
Attendance: 20
Referee: Ondřej Berka (Czech Republic)
22 October 2021
16:00 17:00 (EEST)

Armenia	0–2	Belarus
	Report	Sivkov 35'; Mialkouski 85'

Haradski Stadium, Barysaw
Attendance: 50
Referee: Andrei Chivulete (Romania)

=== Ranking of third-placed teams ===
To determine the four best third-placed teams from the qualifying round which advance to the elite round, only the results of the third-placed teams against the first and second-placed teams in their group are taken into account.

Pos	Grp	Team	Pld	W	D	L	GF	GA	GD	Pts	Qualification
1	4	Hungary	2	1	0	1	3	1	+2	3	Elite round
2	11	Wales	2	1	0	1	3	3	0	3	Elite round
3	2	Latvia	2	0	1	1	2	3	−1	1	Elite round
4	7	Bosnia and Herzegovina	2	0	1	1	1	2	−1	1	Elite round
5	13	Belarus	2	0	1	1	0	1	−1	1	
6	3	Norway	2	0	1	1	2	4	−2	1	
7	5	North Macedonia	2	0	1	1	0	2	−2	1	
8	8	Cyprus	2	0	1	1	1	4	−3	1	
9	10	Croatia	2	0	0	2	0	2	−2	0	
10	12	Northern Ireland	2	0	0	2	2	5	−3	0	
11	1	Montenegro	2	0	0	2	0	3	−3	0	
12	9	Austria	2	0	0	2	0	5	−5	0	
13	6	Romania	2	0	0	2	0	7	−7	0	

Source: UEFA
Rules for classification: 1) points; 2) goal difference; 3) goals scored; 4) disciplinary points; 5) coefficient; 6) drawing of lots.

== Elite round ==
The draw for the elite round will be held at the UEFA headquarters in Nyon, Switzerland.

=== Draw ===
The draw for the elite round will be held in spring 2022, at the UEFA headquarters in Nyon, Switzerland.

The teams were seeded according to their results in the qualifying round. The Netherlands and Spain, which received byes to the elite round, were automatically seeded into Pot A. Each group contained one team from Pot A, one team from Pot B, one team from Pot C, and one team from Pot D. Winners and runners-up from the same qualifying round group could not be drawn in the same group, but the best third-placed teams could be drawn in the same group as winners or runners-up from the same qualifying round group.

Pos	Grp	Team	Pld	W	D	L	GF	GA	GD	Pts	Seeding
1	—	Netherlands	0	0	0	0	0	0	0	0	Pot A
2	—	Spain	0	0	0	0	0	0	0	0	Pot A
3	6	Germany	3	3	0	0	18	1	+17	9	Pot A
4	9	Slovenia	3	3	0	0	13	0	+13	9	Pot A
5	12	Italy	3	3	0	0	10	0	+10	9	Pot A
6	10	Bulgaria	3	3	0	0	8	0	+8	9	Pot A
7	13	England	3	2	1	0	10	2	+8	7	Pot A
8	7	Switzerland	3	2	1	0	9	1	+8	7	Pot A
9	5	Republic of Ireland	3	2	1	0	9	2	+7	7	Pot B
10	1	Turkey	3	2	1	0	10	4	+6	7	Pot B
11	2	Czech Republic	3	2	1	0	7	2	+5	7	Pot B
12	3	Luxembourg	3	2	1	0	6	2	+4	7	Pot B
13	8	Greece	3	2	1	0	4	0	+4	7	Pot B
14	11	Ukraine	3	2	0	1	7	5	+2	6	Pot B
15	4	Estonia	3	2	0	1	3	4	−1	6	Pot B
16	1	Denmark	3	2	1	0	10	4	+6	7	Pot B
17	10	Serbia	3	2	0	1	12	2	+10	6	Pot C
18	11	Portugal	3	2	0	1	9	3	+6	6 (Note: Disciplinary points: Portugal -2, Russia -5.)	Pot C
19	6	Russia	3	2	0	1	9	3	+6	6	Pot C
20	3	Belgium	3	2	0	1	5	1	+4	6	Pot C
21	9	Kosovo	3	2	0	1	2	1	+1	6	Pot C
22	12	Scotland	3	2	0	1	6	7	−1	6	Pot C
23	2	Sweden	3	1	2	0	12	4	+8	5	Pot C
24	13	Slovakia	3	1	2	0	7	2	+5	5	Pot C
25	7	Finland	3	1	2	0	6	2	+4	5	Pot D
26	5	Poland	3	1	2	0	3	2	+1	5	Pot D
27	8	France	3	1	1	1	4	2	+2	4	Pot D
28	4	Georgia	3	1	1	1	2	2	0	4	Pot D
29	7	Bosnia and Herzegovina	3	1	1	1	7	3	+4	4	Pot D
30	2	Latvia	3	1	1	1	6	4	+2	4	Pot D
31	4	Hungary	3	1	1	1	3	1	+2	4	Pot D
32	11	Wales	3	1	1	1	4	4	0	4	Pot D

Source: UEFA
Rules for classification: 1) group position; 2) points; 3) goal difference; 4) goals scored; 5) disciplinary points; 6) coefficient ranking; 7) drawing of lots.

=== Groups ===
==== Group 1 ====
Pos	Team	Pld	W	D	L	GF	GA	GD	Pts	Qualification
1	Netherlands (H)	3	1	2	0	3	1	+2	5	Final tournament
2	Hungary	3	1	1	1	4	4	0	4	
3	Greece	3	0	3	0	2	2	0	3	
4	Slovakia	3	0	2	1	3	5	−2	2	

Source: UEFA
Rules for classification: Qualification tiebreakers
(H) Hosts
24 March 2022
16:00

Netherlands	2–0	Hungary
Slory 4', 71'	Report

Sportpark Parkzicht, Uden
Attendance: 652
Referee: Nikola Popov (Bulgaria)
24 March 2022
19:00

Slovakia	1–1	Greece
L. Sauer 79'	Report	Georgiadis 41' (pen.)

De Wieën, Venray
Attendance: 192
Referee: Novak Simović (Serbia)

27 March 2022
12:00

Greece	1–1	Hungary
Gkitersos 30'	Report	Komlósi 90+3'

Sportpark Parkzicht, Uden
Attendance: 143
Referee: Novak Simović (Serbia)
27 March 2022
16:00

Netherlands	1–1	Slovakia
Babadi 66' (pen.)	Report	L. Sauer 9'

De Wieën, Venray
Attendance: 6,480
Referee: Jamie Robinson (Northern Ireland)

30 March 2022
16:00

Greece	0–0	Netherlands
	Report

Sportpark Parkzicht, Uden
Referee: Nikola Popov (Bulgaria)
30 March 2022
16:00

Hungary	3–1	Slovakia
Lisztes 4'; Komlósi 25'; Pesti 63'	Report	Komlósi 12' (o.g.)

De Wieën, Venray
Referee: Jamie Robinson (Northern Ireland)

==== Group 2 ====
Pos	Team	Pld	W	D	L	GF	GA	GD	Pts	Qualification
1	Denmark (H)	3	2	1	0	10	4	+6	7	Final tournament
2	Sweden	3	1	2	0	4	2	+2	5	Final tournament
3	Switzerland	3	1	0	2	1	7	−6	3	
4	Latvia	3	0	1	2	2	4	−2	1	

Source: UEFA
Rules for classification: Qualification tiebreakers
(H) Hosts
23 March 2022
13:00

Switzerland	1–0	Latvia
Deme 68'	Report

Silkeborg Stadium, Silkeborg
Referee: Ondřej Berka (Czech Republic)
23 March 2022
19:00

Sweden	2–2	Denmark
Kanga 49'; Madjed 52'	Report	Simmelhack 9'; Sahsah 42'

Silkeborg Stadium, Silkeborg
Referee: Igor Stojchevski (North Macedonia)

26 March 2022
13:00

Switzerland	0–2	Sweden
	Report	Madjed 36', 69'

Silkeborg Stadium, Silkeborg
Referee: Mario Zebec (Croatia)
26 March 2022
19:00

Denmark	3–2	Latvia
Andreasen 1'; Hansborg-Sørensen 29', 31'	Report	Patrikejevs 58'; Adītājs 90+3'

Silkeborg Stadium, Silkeborg
Referee: Ondřej Berka (Czech Republic)

29 March 2022
14:00

Denmark	5–0	Switzerland
Bjørnholm 19'; Hansborg-Sørensen 41', 73'; Højlund 64'; Simmelhack 82'	Report

Ikast Stadium, Ikast
Referee: Igor Stojchevski (North Macedonia)
29 March 2022
14:00

Latvia	0–0	Sweden
	Report

Silkeborg Stadium, Silkeborg
Referee: Mario Zebec (Croatia)

==== Group 3 ====
Pos	Team	Pld	W	D	L	GF	GA	GD	Pts	Qualification
1	Germany	3	3	0	0	12	2	+10	9	Final tournament
2	Scotland (H)	3	1	1	1	8	7	+1	4	Final tournament
3	Georgia	3	1	0	2	3	10	−7	3	
4	Czech Republic	3	0	1	2	5	9	−4	1	

Source: UEFA
Rules for classification: Qualification tiebreakers
(H) Hosts
23 March 2022
13:00

Scotland	2–2	Czech Republic
Wilson 71', 90+3'	Report	M. Pudil 40'; Paluska 43'

Falkirk Stadium, Falkirk
Referee: Ishmael Barbara (Malta)
23 March 2022
19:00

Germany	3–0	Georgia
Bischof 26'; Weiper 76'; Krattenmacher 87'	Report

Falkirk Stadium, Falkirk
Referee: Sigurd Kringstad (Norway)

26 March 2022
13:00

Germany	4–0	Scotland
Bischof 30', 57'; Pejčinović 46'; Ibrahimović 76'	Report

Falkirk Stadium, Falkirk
Referee: Ivar Orri Kristjansson (Iceland)
26 March 2022
19:00

Czech Republic	1–2	Georgia
Rus 63'	Report	Narimanidze 35'; Parkadze 77'

Falkirk Stadium, Falkirk
Referee: Ishmael Barbara (Malta)

29 March 2022
18:30

Czech Republic	2–5	Germany
Rus 13'; Gaszczyk 86' (pen.)	Report	Pejcinovic 11', 42', 90'; Remiáš 15' (o.g.); Wanner 47'

New Douglas Park, Hamilton
Referee: Sigurd Kringstad (Norway)
29 March 2022
18:30

Georgia	1–6	Scotland
Khachidze 47'	Report	Cooper 9'; Doak 43', 44', 84'; Wilson 51'; Khachilava 61' (o.g.)

Falkirk Stadium, Falkirk
Referee: Ivar Orri Kristjansson (Iceland)

==== Group 4 ====
Pos	Team	Pld	W	D	L	GF	GA	GD	Pts	Qualification
1	Spain	3	3	0	0	9	1	+8	9	Final tournament
2	Belgium	3	2	0	1	14	2	+12	6	Final tournament
3	Bosnia and Herzegovina (H)	3	1	0	2	3	11	−8	3	
4	Estonia	3	0	0	3	2	14	−12	0	

Source: UEFA
Rules for classification: Qualification tiebreakers
(H) Hosts
23 March 2022
15:00

Spain	4–1	Bosnia and Herzegovina
Carvalho 28', 69'; Roca 50'; Moreno 78' (pen.)	Report	Brkić 53'

Stadium Etno Selo Stanisići, Bijeljina
Referee: Robert Ian Jenkins (Wales)
23 March 2022
15:00

Belgium	8–1	Estonia
Fofana 10', 27', 41'; Al Mazyani 44'; Kinsiona 50'; Burlet 56'; Godts 58'; Talbi 88'	Report	Mustmaa 40'

Novi Gradski Stadion, Ugljevik
Referee: Arda Kardeşler (Turkey)

26 March 2022
15:00

Spain	1–0	Belgium
Carvalho 39'	Report

Stadium Etno Selo Stanisići, Bijeljina
Referee: Robert Ian Jenkins (Wales)
26 March 2022
15:00

Estonia	1–2	Bosnia and Herzegovina
Kolobov 27'	Report	Rizvanović 19'; Bogdanić 87'

Novi Gradski Stadion, Ugljevik
Referee: Elchin Masiyev (Azerbaijan)

29 March 2022
15:00

Estonia	0–4	Spain
	Report	Ginés 40'; Roca 57', 61'; Bravo 71'

Novi Gradski Stadion, Ugljevik
Referee: Arda Kardeşler (Turkey)
29 March 2022
15:00

Bosnia and Herzegovina	0–6	Belgium
	Report	Agyei 7', 30', 55'; Zrnić 33' (o.g.); Fofana 45'; Monticelli 64'

Stadium Etno Selo Stanisići, Bijeljina
Referee: Elchin Masiyev (Azerbaijan)

==== Group 5 ====
Pos	Team	Pld	W	D	L	GF	GA	GD	Pts	Qualification
1	France	2	2	0	0	5	1	+4	6	Final tournament
2	Luxembourg (H)	2	1	0	1	2	2	0	3	Final tournament
3	England	2	0	0	2	1	5	−4	0	
4	Russia	0	0	0	0	0	0	0	0	Banned due to invasion of Ukraine

Source: UEFA
Rules for classification: Qualification tiebreakers
(H) Hosts
23 March 2022
18:00

Luxembourg	0–2	France
	Report	Tel 19'; Doué 54' (pen.)

Stade Alphonse Theis, Hesperange
Referee: Snir Levy (Israel)
26 March 2022

England	Cancelled	Russia
	Report

23 March 2022

Russia	Cancelled	Luxembourg
	Report

26 March 2022
16:00

France	3–1	England
Tel 20' (pen.); Atangana Edoa 83'; Byar 86'	Report	Cozier-Duberry 40'

Stade Alphonse Theis, Hesperange
Referee: Kai Erik Steen (Norway)

29 March 2022
18:00

England	0–2	Luxembourg
	Report	Flick 31' (pen.); Souchard 53'

Stade Alphonse Theis, Hesperange
Referee: Genc Nuza (Kosovo)
29 March 2022

France	Cancelled	Russia
	Report

==== Group 6 ====
Pos	Team	Pld	W	D	L	GF	GA	GD	Pts	Qualification
1	Italy (H)	3	3	0	0	5	1	+4	9	Final tournament
2	Poland	3	2	0	1	5	4	+1	6	Final tournament
3	Ukraine	3	1	0	2	5	6	−1	3	
4	Kosovo	3	0	0	3	1	5	−4	0	

Updated to match(es) played on 23 April 2022. Source: UEFA
Rules for classification: Qualification tiebreakers
(H) Hosts
20 April 2022
12:00

Kosovo	0–2	Ukraine
	Report	Kremchanin 74'; Husiev 90+1'

Stadio Comunale Stefano Lotti, Poggibonsi
Referee: Iwan Griffith (Wales)
20 April 2022
15:00

Italy	1–0	Poland
Zięba 48' (o.g.)	Report

Stadio Artemio Franchi, Siena
Referee: Marian Barbu (Romania)

23 April 2022
12:00

Ukraine	2–3	Poland
Husiev 61'; Dzen 88'	Report	Tkacz 36'; Smiglewski 45+1'; Sławiński 58'

Stadio Comunale Gino Manni, Colle di Val d'Elsa
Referee: Iwan Griffith (Wales)
23 April 2022
15:00

Italy	1–0	Kosovo
Bolzan 75' (pen.)	Report

Stadio Comunale Stefano Lotti, Poggibonsi
Referee: Rob Hennessy (Ireland)

26 April 2022
15:00

Ukraine	1–3	Italy
Balaba 90+4'	Report	Vacca 28'; Di Maggio 59'; Lipani 74'

Stadio Artemio Franchi, Siena
Referee: Marian Barbu (Romania)
26 April 2022
15:00

Poland	2–1	Kosovo
Smiglewski 59'; Terlecki 86' (pen.)	Report	Krasniqi 30'

Stadio Comunale Gino Manni, Colle di Val d'Elsa
Referee: Rob Hennessy (Ireland)

==== Group 7 ====
Pos	Team	Pld	W	D	L	GF	GA	GD	Pts	Qualification
1	Serbia	3	2	1	0	9	6	+3	7	Final tournament
2	Turkey	3	2	0	1	11	8	+3	6	Final tournament
3	Slovenia (H)	3	1	1	1	10	6	+4	4	
4	Wales	3	0	0	3	4	14	−10	0	

Source: UEFA
Rules for classification: Qualification tiebreakers
(H) Hosts
23 March 2022
12:00

Slovenia	5–0	Wales
Čuber Potočnik 34', 61'; Kasalo 43'; Čuk 69'; Ristić 72'	Report

Športni park Radenci, Radenci
Referee: Goga Kikacheishvili (Georgia)
23 March 2022
16:00

Serbia	3–2	Turkey
Bubanj 2', 7'; Šljivić 79'	Report	Yıldız 34'; Güler 73'

TŠC Trate Gornja Radgona, Gornja Radgona
Referee: Juri Frischer (Estonia)

26 March 2022
12:00

Slovenia	2–2	Serbia
Čuk 45+3'; Kvaternik 53'	Report	Majstorović 84'; Stanković 90+6'

Športni park Radenci, Radenci
Referee: Krzysztof Jakubik (Poland)
26 March 2022
16:00

Turkey	5–2	Wales
Özdemir 9'; Sihlaroğlu 10'; Güler 33'; Uzun 55', 86'	Report	Harris 17' (pen.), 58' (pen.)

TŠC Trate Gornja Radgona, Gornja Radgona
Referee: Juri Frischer (Estonia)

29 March 2022
16:00

Turkey	4–3	Slovenia
Uzun 45', 86'; Sönmez 57'; Yıldız 88'	Report	Kasalo 4'; Dvoršak 47'; Stojinović 72'

Športni park Radenci, Radenci
Referee: Krzysztof Jakubik (Poland)
29 March 2022
16:00

Wales	2–4	Serbia
Osmand 19'; Benjamin 55'	Report	Bubanj 59', 77'; Milošević 63' (pen.), 69'

TŠC Trate Gornja Radgona, Gornja Radgona
Referee: Goga Kikacheishvili (Georgia)

==== Group 8 ====
Pos	Team	Pld	W	D	L	GF	GA	GD	Pts	Qualification
1	Portugal (H)	3	3	0	0	15	3	+12	9	Final tournament
2	Bulgaria	3	1	1	1	4	4	0	4	Final tournament
3	Finland	3	1	0	2	4	12	−8	3	
4	Republic of Ireland	3	0	1	2	5	9	−4	1	

Source: UEFA
Rules for classification: Qualification tiebreakers
(H) Hosts
23 March 2022
12:00

Bulgaria	1–0	Finland
Raychev 16'	Report

Estádio Municipal, Santa Comba Dão
Referee: Besfort Kasumi (Kosovo)
23 March 2022
16:00

Portugal	4–1	Republic of Ireland
Veloso 19'; Rodrigues 45+4'; Ribeiro 90+4'; Lima 90+7'	Report	O'Mahony 72'

Estádio do Fontelo, Viseu
Referee: Adam Ladebäck (Sweden)

26 March 2022
12:00

Republic of Ireland	2–3	Finland
Umeh 14', 51'	Report	Freitas Von Hellens 43'; Laine 78'; Lika 82'

Parque Desportivo de Sant´Ana, Penalva do Castelo
Referee: Besfort Kasumi (Kosovo)
26 March 2022
17:00

Bulgaria	1–2	Portugal
Marinov 2'	Report	Djaló 29'; Varela 86'

Estádio João Cardoso, Tondela
Referee: Ion Orlic (Moldova)

29 March 2022
16:00

Republic of Ireland	2–2	Bulgaria
Vata 61'; Curtis 75'	Report	Raychev 13', 41'

Estádio Municipal, Santa Comba Dão
Referee: Ion Orlic (Moldova)
29 March 2022
16:00

Finland	1–9	Portugal
Talvitie 2'	Report	Afonso Moreira 11'; João Gonçalves 13'; José Rodrigues 45+1', 60' (pen.), 65'; Ribeiro 74', 80', 89'; Diogo Monteiro 90+2'

Estádio do Fontelo, Viseu
Referee: Adam Ladebäck (Sweden)

=== Ranking of second-placed teams ===
To determine the seven best second-placed teams from the elite round which qualify for the final tournament, only the results of the second-placed teams against the first and third-placed teams in their group are taken into account.

Pos	Grp	Team	Pld	W	D	L	GF	GA	GD	Pts	Qualification
1	2	Sweden	2	1	1	0	4	2	+2	4	Final tournament
2	4	Belgium	2	1	0	1	6	1	+5	3	Final tournament
3	3	Scotland	2	1	0	1	6	5	+1	3	Final tournament
4	7	Turkey	2	1	0	1	6	6	0	3	Final tournament
5	6	Poland	2	1	0	1	3	3	0	3	Final tournament
6	8	Bulgaria	2	1	0	1	2	2	0	3 (Note: Ranked by disciplinary points (Bulgaria: 6 pts; Luxembourg: 7 pts).)	Final tournament
7	5	Luxembourg	2	1	0	1	2	2	0	3	Final tournament
8	1	Hungary	2	0	1	1	1	3	−2	1	

Source: UEFA
Rules for classification: 1) points; 2) goal difference; 3) goals scored; 4) disciplinary points; 5) coefficient; 6) drawing of lots.

== Qualified teams ==
The following 16 teams qualify for the final tournament.

Team	Qualified as	Qualified on	Previous appearances in Under-17 Euro^{1} only U-17 era (since 2002)
Israel	Hosts	24 September 2019	3 (2003, 2005, 2018)
Netherlands	Elite round Group 1 winners	30 March 2022	13 (2002, 2005, 2007, 2008, 2009, **2011**, **2012**, 2014, 2015, 2016, 2017, **2018**, **2019**)
Denmark	Elite round Group 2 winners	29 March 2022	5 (2002, 2003, 2011, 2016, 2018)
Germany	Elite round Group 3 winners	26 March 2022	12 (2002, 2006, 2007, **2009**, 2011, 2012, 2014, 2015, 2016, 2017, 2018, 2019)
Spain	Elite round Group 4 winners	26 March 2022	13 (2002, 2003, 2004, 2006, **2007**, **2008**, 2009, 2010, 2015, 2016, **2017**, 2018, 2019)
France	Elite round Group 5 winners	26 March 2022	12 (2002, **2004**, 2007, 2008, 2009, 2010, 2011, 2012, **2015**, 2016, 2017, 2019)
Italy	Elite round Group 6 winners	26 April 2022	9 (2003, 2005, 2009, 2013, 2015, 2016, 2017, 2018, 2019)
Serbia	Elite round Group 7 winners	29 March 2022	7 (2002^{2}, 2006^{3}, 2008, 2011, 2016, 2017, 2018)
Portugal	Elite round Group 8 winners	29 March 2022	8 (2002, **2003**, 2004, 2010, 2014, **2016**, 2018, 2019)
Sweden	Elite round among best 7 runners-up	29 March 2022	4 (2013, 2016, 2018, 2019)
Belgium	Elite round among best 7 runners-up	29 March 2022	7 (2006, 2007, 2012, 2015, 2016, 2018, 2019)
Scotland	Elite round among best 7 runners-up	29 March 2022	5 (2008, 2014, 2015, 2016, 2017)
Turkey	Elite round among best 7 runners-up	29 March 2022	7 (2004, **2005**, 2008, 2009, 2010, 2014, 2017)
Bulgaria	Elite round among best 7 runners-up	29 March 2022	1 (2015)
Luxembourg	Elite round among best 7 runners-up	30 March 2022	1 (2006)
Poland	Elite round among best 7 runners-up	26 April 2022	2 (2002, 2012)

^{1} Bold indicates champions for that year. Italic indicates hosts for that year.
^{2} As Yugoslavia
^{3} As Serbia and Montenegro

== Goalscorers ==
In the qualifying round there were 256 goals scored in 78 matches, for an average of 3.28 goals per match.

In the elite round there were 171 goals scored in 45 matches, for an average of 3.8 goals per match.

In total, there have been 427 goals scored in 123 matches, for an average of 3.47 goals per match.

8 goals

- (Germany) Dženan Pejčinović

6 goals

- (Germany) Tom Bischof
- (Scotland) Rory Wilson
- (Serbia) Mateja Bubanj

5 goals

- (Denmark) Elias Hansborg-Sørensen
- (Portugal) Rodrigo Ribeiro
- (Slovenia) Jaka Potočnik

4 goals

- (Belgium) Malick Fofana
- (Bulgaria) Roberto Raychev
- (Denmark) Zidan Sertdemir
- (Republic of Ireland) Mark O'Mahony
- (Serbia) Jovan Milošević
- (Slovenia) Tine Čuk
- (Sweden) Montader Madjed
- (Turkey) Arda Güler
- (Turkey) Semih Kılıçsoy
- (Turkey) Can Uzun
- (Ukraine) Oleksiy Husiev

3 goals

- (Belgium) Enock Agyei
- (Bulgaria) Petar Kirev
- (Czech Republic) Jan Buryán
- (Spain) Miguel Carvalho
- (Germany) Arijon Ibrahimović
- (Germany) Dzenan Pejcinovic
- (Germany) Paul Wanner
- (Italy) Alessandro Bolzan
- (Italy) Luca Di Maggio
- (Poland) Oliwier Sławiński
- (Portugal) Dinis Rodrigues
- (Portugal) José Rodrigues
- (Republic of Ireland) Rocco Vata
- (Russia) Kirill Glebov
- (Scotland) Ben Doak
- (Serbia) Jovan Šljivić
- (Slovakia) Milan Rehus
- (Slovenia) Aleks Ristić
- (Spain) Joel Roca
- (Sweden) Roony Bardghji
- (Sweden) Jardell Kanga
- (Sweden) Fredrik Nissen
- (Ukraine) Dmytro Kremchanin
- (Wales) Luke Harris

2 goals

- (Belgium) Noah Kinsiona
- (Belgium) Chemsdine Talbi
- (Bosnia and Herzegovina) Seid Pramenković
- (Bulgaria) Borislav Marinov
- (Czech Republic) Miloš Pudil
- (Czech Republic) Daniel Rus
- (Denmark) Noah Sahsah
- (Denmark) Alexander Simmelhack
- (England) Amario Cozier-Duberry
- (England) Jamie Donley
- (England) Emre Tezgel
- (Estonia) Karel Mustmaa
- (Finland) Jasper Jalonen
- (Finland) Yllson Lika
- (France) Désiré Doué
- (France) Tom Saettel
- (France) Mathys Tel
- (Georgia (country)) Aleksandre Narimanidze
- (Germany) Maurice Krattenmacher
- (Germany) Nelson Weiper
- (Italy) Valentin Carboni
- (Italy) Giacomo Marconi
- (Kosovo) Elton Krasniqi
- (Latvia) Ivans Patrikejevs
- (Latvia) Alans Kangars
- (Luxembourg) Tim Flick
- (Malta) Zak Barbara
- (North Macedonia) Zani Nazifi
- (North Macedonia) Kire Stojanov
- (Netherlands) Jaden Slory
- (Northern Ireland) Omari Kellyman
- (Poland) Kacper Smiglewski
- (Portugal) João Gonçalves
- (Portugal) Diogo Monteiro
- (Portugal) João Veloso
- (Republic of Ireland) Sam Curtis
- (Republic of Ireland) Justin Ferizaj
- (Republic of Ireland) Franco Umeh
- (Romania) Sebastian Borza
- (Russia) Aleksandr Komissarov
- (Russia) Danila Kozlov
- (Serbia) Mateja Bubanj
- (Serbia) Mirko Nikolašević
- (Slovakia) Leo Sauer
- (Slovakia) Michal Svoboda
- (Slovakia) Zoran Zahradnik
- (Slovenia) Niko Kasalo
- (Slovenia) Tilen Kovačič
- (Slovenia) Mark Stojinović
- (Switzerland) Labinot Bajrami
- (Switzerland) Nevio Di Giusto
- (Switzerland) Leon Frokaj
- (Turkey) Emirhan Acar
- (Turkey) Kenan Yıldız
- (Ukraine) Nazar Balaba
- (Ukraine) Mykyta Dzen
- (Wales) Omari Benjamin

1 goal

- (Albania) Orsi Ageja
- (Albania) Klevis Haxhari
- (Albania) Oresti Kosmallari
- (Albania) Arlind Kurti
- (Austria) Mücahit Ibrahimoglu
- (Austria) Benedict Scharner
- (Belarus) Ruslan Mialkouski
- (Belarus) Ivan Sivkov
- (Belgium) Faissal Al Mazyani
- (Belgium) Vincent Burlet
- (Belgium) Mika Godts
- (Belgium) Luca Monticelli
- (Bosnia and Herzegovina) Sergej Bogdanić
- (Bosnia and Herzegovina) Marko Brkić
- (Bosnia and Herzegovina) Sergej Damjanić
- (Bosnia and Herzegovina) Kenan Lamadžema
- (Bosnia and Herzegovina) Luka Misimović
- (Bosnia and Herzegovina) Ante Prusina
- (Bosnia and Herzegovina) Mahir Rizvanović
- (Bosnia and Herzegovina) Amar Zahirović
- (Bulgaria) Martin Georgiev
- (Bulgaria) Asen Mitkov
- (Bulgaria) Antoan Stoyanov
- (Croatia) Mate Ivković
- (Croatia) Zlatan Košćević
- (Czech Republic) Pavel Gaszczyk
- (Czech Republic) Jan Paluska
- (Czech Republic) David Planka
- (Czech Republic) Jiri Remiáš
- (Cyprus) Stavros Charalambous
- (Cyprus) Zanos Savva
- (Denmark) Valdemar Andreasen
- (Denmark) Julius Beck
- (Denmark) Magnus Bjørnholm
- (Denmark) Malthe Böndergaard
- (Denmark) Emil Højlund
- (England) Kobbie Mainoo
- (England) Isaac Smith
- (England) Nico O'Reilly
- (England) Kane Taylor
- (Estonia) Emir Dikajev
- (Estonia) Dimitri Jepihhin
- (Estonia) Mihhail Kolobov
- (Finland) Daniel Armstrong
- (Finland) Júlio Freitas Von Hellens
- (Finland) Onni Hänninen
- (Finland) Roni Hudd
- (Finland) Lauri Laine
- (Finland) Juho Talvitie
- (France) Valentin Atangana Edoa
- (France) Naim Byar
- (France) Elyaz Zidane
- (Germany) Leonardo García Posadas
- (Germany) Laurin Ulrich
- (Georgia (country)) Tengo Alibegashvili
- (Georgia (country)) Givi Khachidze
- (Georgia (country)) Luka Parkadze
- (Greece) Christos Alexiou
- (Greece) Charalampos Georgiadis
- (Greece) Ioannis Gkitersos
- (Greece) Konstantinos Gkoumas
- (Greece) Dimitrios Kaloskamis
- (Greece) Konstantinos Mavropoulos
- (Gibraltar) Jaiden Bartolo
- (Hungary) Benedek Barkóczi
- (Hungary) Bence Komlósi
- (Hungary) Krisztián Lisztes
- (Hungary) Tamás Szűcs
- (Iceland) William Cole Campbell
- (Iceland) Daníel Gudjohnsen
- (Italy) Kevin Bruno
- (Italy) Aaron Ciammaglichella
- (Italy) Luca Lipani
- (Italy) Alessio Vacca
- (Kazakhstan) Abinur Nurymbet
- (Kosovo) Arjol Bllaca
- (Latvia) Roberts Adītājs
- (Latvia) Ēriks Boroduška
- (Latvia) Emīls Evelons
- (Latvia) Dāvis Sedols
- (Luxembourg) Hugo Luis
- (Luxembourg) Thomas Souchard
- (Luxembourg) Jayson Videira
- (Montenegro) Luka Bubanja
- (Montenegro) Balša Mrvaljević
- (Montenegro) Milan Roganović
- (North Macedonia) Martin Gjorgievski
- (Netherlands) Isaac Babadi
- (Northern Ireland) Leon Philip Boyd
- (Northern Ireland) Daithi McCallion
- (Norway) Benjamin Faraas
- (Norway) Antonio Nusa
- (Poland) Maksymilian Dziuba
- (Poland) Kacper Terlecki
- (Poland) Dawid Tkacz
- (Portugal) Ussumane Djaló
- (Portugal) Ivan Lima
- (Portugal) Afonso Moreira
- (Portugal) Guilherme Santos
- (Portugal) Gustavo Varela
- (Republic of Ireland) Kevin Zefi
- (Romania) Adrian Caragea
- (Romania) Matei Moraru
- (Romania) Enes Sali
- (Russia) Aleksey Baranovsky
- (Russia) Maksim Ofitserov
- (San Marino) Pietro Renzi
- (Scotland) Greig Allen
- (Scotland) Cameron Cooper
- (Scotland) Craig Moore
- (Scotland) Malachi Sharpe
- (Serbia) Milan Majstorović
- (Serbia) Mateja Radonjić
- (Serbia) Aleksandar Stanković
- (Slovenia) Matej Dvoršak
- (Slovenia) Oskar Kvaternik
- (Slovenia) Tin Štricelj
- (Spain) Iker Bravo
- (Spain) Álvaro Ginés
- (Spain) Víctor Moreno
- (Sweden) Taha Ayari
- (Sweden) Emmanuel Tannor
- (Switzerland) Leon Asllani
- (Switzerland) Malik Deme
- (Switzerland) Rion Demiri
- (Switzerland) Kevin Krasniqi
- (Turkey) Ali Bülbül
- (Turkey) Hasan Kayali
- (Turkey) Halil Özdemir
- (Turkey) Efe Sihlaroğlu
- (Turkey) Selim Sönmez
- (Ukraine) Yevhenii Mykytiuk
- (Wales) Cole Fleming
- (Wales) Callum Osmand
- (Wales) Alex Roberts

1 own goal

- (Andorra) Guillem Acosta (against North Macedonia)
- (Armenia) Mark Avetisyan (against England)
- (Austria) Jakob Schöller (against Slovenia)
- (Bosnia and Herzegovina) Patrik Zrnić (against Belgium)
- Jiří Remiáš (against the Czech Republic)
- (Faroe Islands) Bjørn Bjarkhamar (against Slovenia)
- (Georgia (country)) Saba Khachilava (against Scotland)
- (Latvia) Alans Kangars (against Lithuania)
- (Liechtenstein) Jonas Weissenhofer (against Croatia)
- (Lithuania) Vykintas Bazys (against Sweden)
- (Malta) Kian Vella (against Denmark)
- (Malta) Sven Xerri (against Denmark)
- (Poland) Dawid Zięba (against Italy)
- (Sweden) Taha Ayari (against the Czech Republic)

2 own goals

- (Kazakhstan) Bakhtishat Abdullayev (against Portugal)

Source: UEFA.com
