= Jalonen (surname) =

Jalonen is a Finnish surname. Notable people with the surname include:

- Jasse Jalonen (born 1973), Finnish football midfielder
- Jukka Jalonen (born 1962), Finnish ice hockey coach and former player
- Jyri Jalonen, Finnish firearms manufacturer
- Kari Jalonen (born 1960), Finnish ice hockey coach and former player
- Olli Jalonen (born 1954), Finnish writer
