= Mawete =

Mawete is a surname. Notable people with the surname include:

- Flavine Mawete (born 2000), Congolese footballer
- Gaz Mawete (born 1991), Congolese singer-songwriter
- João Mawete (born 1983), Angolan footballer
- Noah Mawete (born 2005), Congolese footballer
