= Portugal national under-18 football team =

National association football team

The Portugal national under-18 football team is the association football team that represents the nation of Portugal at the under-18 level.

== Players ==
=== Current squad. ===
The following players were named in the squad for the friendly tournament against Australia, Norway and England on 9, 11 and 13 June 2023 respectively.

Caps and goals are correct as of 28 March 2023, after the match against Finland.

No.	Pos.	Player	Date of birth (age)	Caps	Goals	Club
	GK	Diogo Fernandes	17 February 2005 (age 21)	5	0	(Portuguese Football Federation) Porto
	GK	Ekumbi	2 June 2005 (age 21)	0	0	(Portuguese Football Federation) União Nogueirense
	DF	Leonardo Barroso	12 June 2005 (age 21)	6	0	(Portuguese Football Federation) Sporting CP
	DF	Francisco Chissumba	29 May 2005 (age 21)	5	0	(Portuguese Football Federation) Braga
	DF	Tomás Marques	16 February 2005 (age 21)	5	0	(Portuguese Football Federation) Braga
	DF	Diogo Monteiro	28 January 2005 (age 21)	4	0	(The Football Association) Leeds United
	DF	Miguel Alves	30 December 2005 (age 20)	3	0	(Portuguese Football Federation) Sporting CP
	DF	Duarte Oliveira	14 March 2005 (age 21)	2	0	(Portuguese Football Federation) Famalicão
	DF	Luís Sampaio	23 August 2005 (age 21)	0	0	(Portuguese Football Federation) Famalicão
	MF	Manuel Mendonça	24 March 2005 (age 21)	9	0	(Portuguese Football Federation) Sporting CP
	MF	Ussumane Djaló	6 January 2005 (age 21)	8	0	(Portuguese Football Federation) Porto
	MF	Diego Henrique	24 May 2005 (age 21)	5	1	(Portuguese Football Federation) Braga
	MF	Rodrigo Mendes	2 April 2005 (age 21)	3	1	(Portuguese Football Federation) Belenenses
	MF	Jesse Costa	28 April 2005 (age 21)	0	0	(German Football Association) VfL Wolfsburg II
	MF	Rúben Furtado	1 December 2005 (age 20)	0	0	(Portuguese Football Federation) Vitória de Guimarães
	MF	Rafael Luís	18 February 2005 (age 21)	0	0	(Portuguese Football Federation) Benfica
	FW	Dinis Rodrigues	14 July 2005 (age 21)	9	2	(Portuguese Football Federation) Braga
	FW	Vivaldo	28 January 2005 (age 21)	9	1	(Italian Football Federation) Udinese
	FW	João Rêgo	20 June 2005 (age 21)	6	1	(Portuguese Football Federation) Benfica
	FW	Pedro Sanca	26 March 2005 (age 21)	6	0	(Portuguese Football Federation) Sporting CP
	FW	Fábio Jaló	18 November 2005 (age 20)	3	1	(The Football Association) Barnsley
	FW	Mauro Couto	15 November 2005 (age 20)	3	0	(Portuguese Football Federation) Paços de Ferreira

=== Recent call-ups ===
The following players have been called up within the last twelve months, and are still ineligible for selection.

Pos.	Player	Date of birth (age)	Caps	Goals	Club	Latest call-up

== Competition records ==
=== FIFA Junior Tournament/UEFA European Under-19 Football Championship ===
- Champions (3): 1961, 1994, 1999
- Runners-up (5): 1964, 1971, 1988, 1992, 1997
- Third-place (2): 1960, 1968
- Fourth-place (2): 1993, 1998
