= Paul Wanner =

Austrian footballer (born 2005)

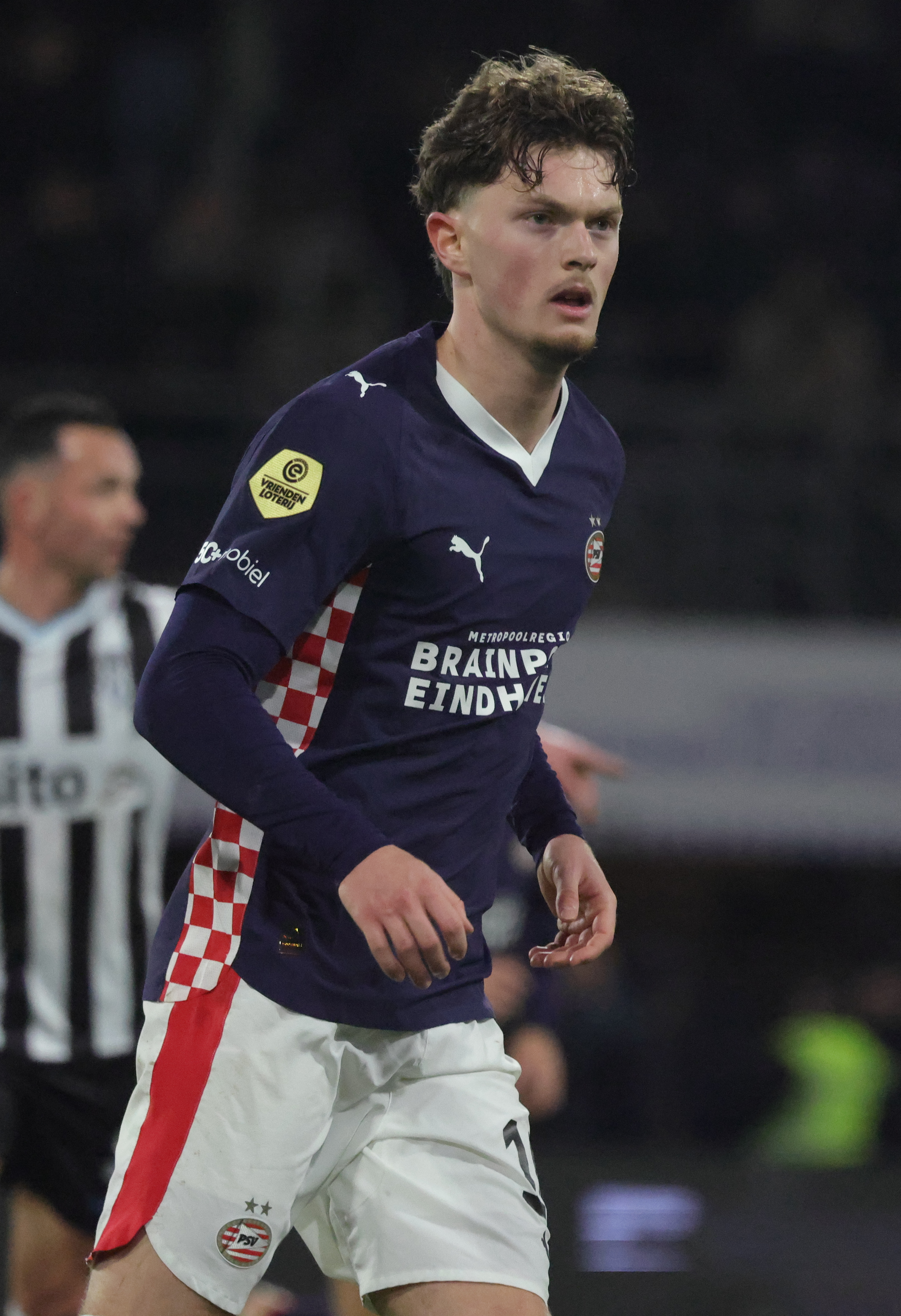
- Wanner with PSV in 2026

Personal information
- Date of birth: 23 December 2005 (age 20)
- Place of birth: Dornbirn, Austria
- Height: 1.85 m (6 ft 1 in)
- Positions: Attacking midfielder; winger

Team information
- Current team: PSV
- Number: 10

Youth career
- SV Amtzell
- –2018: FV Ravensburg
- 2018–2022: Bayern Munich

Senior career*
Years	Team	Apps	(Gls)
2022–2025	Bayern Munich	6	(0)
2022–2023	→ Bayern Munich II	8	(1)
2023–2024	→ SV Elversberg (loan)	28	(6)
2024–2025	→ 1. FC Heidenheim (loan)	29	(3)
2025–	PSV	29	(3)

International career^{‡}
2021–2022	Germany U17	13	(4)
2022	Germany U18	2	(0)
2023–2024	Germany U20	3	(2)
2024–2025	Germany U21	9	(1)
2026–	Austria	9	(0)
Medal record
Men's football
Representing Germany
UEFA European Under-21 Championship
Runner-up	2025 Slovakia
- * Club domestic league appearances and goals as of 15:30, 20 September 2026 (UTC) ‡ National team caps and goals as of 18:45, 27 September 2026 (UTC)

Paul Wanner (German pronunciation: [paʊ̯l ˈvanɐ]; born 23 December 2005) is an Austrian professional footballer who plays as an attacking midfielder for Eredivisie club PSV and the Austria national team. He represented Germany at youth international level before switching allegiance to Austria.

== Club career ==
=== Youth career ===
Wanner played for the youth team of FV Ravensburg, before joining Bayern Munich's youth team in mid-2018.

=== Bayern Munich ===
Wanner was called up by Julian Nagelsmann to the Bayern Munich first team in January 2022, as many of the team's regulars were missing after testing positive for COVID-19. He made his professional debut for Bayern in the Bundesliga on 7 January 2022 against Borussia Mönchengladbach, coming on as a substitute in the 75th minute for Marc Roca. In doing so, he became the youngest player in Bayern Munich's history at the age of 16 years and 15 days, and the second-youngest in Bundesliga history behind Youssoufa Moukoko (who was 14 days younger). The match finished as a 2–1 home loss for Bayern.

On 12 October 2022, at the age of 16 years and 293 days, Wanner became Bayern's youngest player in the Champions League, when he came on as a second-half substitute to Dayot Upamecano in a 4–2 away win against Viktoria Plzeň.

==== Loan to SV Elversberg ====
On 1 September 2023, Wanner joined newly promoted 2. Bundesliga club SV Elversberg on a season-long loan for the 2023–24 season.

==== Loan to 1. FC Heidenheim ====
On 24 June 2024, Wanner joined Bundesliga club 1. FC Heidenheim on a season-long loan for the 2024–25 season. On 17 August, he scored his first goal in a 4–0 away victory over FC 08 Villingen in the DFB-Pokal. A week later, on 25 August, he scored his inaugural Bundesliga goal in a 2–0 away win over FC St. Pauli.

Four days later, he scored his first goal in European competitions in a 3–2 victory over BK Häcken in the Conference League play-off round second leg. On the following Bundesliga matchday he scored a penalty against FC Augsburg, becoming the youngest player in Bundesliga history to do so.

=== PSV ===
On 22 August 2025, Wanner joined Dutch club PSV on a permanent deal. Later that year, on 16 December, he scored his first goal for the club in a 3–0 victory over GVVV in the KNVB Cup. A month later, on 10 January 2026, he netted his first Eredivisie goal in a 5–1 win over Excelsior.

== International career ==
Wanner made his debut for the Germany national under-17 team on 6 August 2021 in a 10–1 win over Poland. In total, he has played thirteen matches at the under-17 level, and scored two goals in 2022 UEFA European Under-17 Championship qualification.

In November 2022, he was invited by Ralf Rangnick to watch and meet the senior Austria national team in hopes to join and represent them for the UEFA Euro 2024 in Germany. He was called up to the German under-21 team in October 2024, for whom he scored his first goal on his line-up debut in a 2–1 victory over Bulgaria in the Euro qualification.

In November 2024, Germany coach Julian Nagelsmann called up 18 year-old Wanner for the UEFA Nations League matches against Luxembourg and Hungary. However, Wanner rejected stating he feels not ready to make a decision yet and wants to earn a call up merely for his performances. Nagelsmann responded to the statement with understanding describing Wanner's decision as mature, however he also said that the DFB is insisting of already including him in the Germany squad for the 2026 FIFA World Cup.

Wanner would still continue playing for the under-21 team and take part at the Euros in 2025, rejecting a participation at the FIFA Club World Cup with Bayern. He'd feature in five of Germany's six matches en route to the final, registering an assist in the semi-final and finishing runner-up.

In January 2026, rumours emerged that Wanner has chosen the Austrian national football team, in order to have higher chances to play at the 2026 FIFA World Cup. These rumours were denied by Wanner himself in a press conference a day prior to the UEFA Champions League league phase match against his former club Bayern Munich. On 6 March 2026 however, Wanner announced his intention to represent the Austrian senior national team. Three days later, his request to switch his international allegiance to Austria was approved by FIFA.

On 16 March 2026, he received his first senior call-up by Ralf Rangnick into the Austrian national team for the friendlies against Ghana and South Korea. He gave his debut on 27 March in a 5–1 win over Ghana.

On 18 May 2026, Wanner was selected in Ralf Rangnick’s 26-man squad for the 2026 FIFA World Cup, marking Austria’s first appearance in the tournament since 1998.

== Personal life ==
Wanner was born in the Austrian city of Dornbirn to a German father and an Austrian mother and grew up in Amtzell, Germany. He holds both Austrian and German citizenship. His father Klaus is a mechanical engineer and former footballer who played as a midfielder, he helped Austria Lustenau as its captain to promotion to second tier 2. Liga and reached the round of last 16 of the Austrian Cup in 1991–92.

== Career statistics ==
=== Club ===
As of match played 20 September 2026

Appearances and goals by club, season and competition
Club	Season	League			National cup (Note: Includes DFB-Pokal, KNVB Cup)		Europe		Other		Total	
Club	Season	Division	Apps	Goals	Apps	Goals	Apps	Goals	Apps	Goals	Apps	Goals
Bayern Munich	2021–22	Bundesliga	4	0	0	0	0	0	0	0	4	0
Bayern Munich	2022–23	Bundesliga	2	0	0	0	2 (Note: Appearances in UEFA Champions League)	0	0	0	4	0
Bayern Munich	2023–24	Bundesliga	0	0	0	0	0	0	0	0	0	0
Bayern Munich	Total		6	0	0	0	2	0	0	0	8	0
Bayern Munich II	2022–23	Regionalliga Bayern	5	0	—		—		—		5	0
Bayern Munich II	2023–24	Regionalliga Bayern	3	1	—		—		—		3	1
Bayern Munich II	Total		8	1	—		—		—		8	1
SV Elversberg (loan)	2023–24	2. Bundesliga	28	6	0	0	—		—		28	6
1. FC Heidenheim (loan)	2024–25	Bundesliga	30	3	2	1	8 (Note: Appearances in UEFA Conference League)	2	—		40	6
PSV	2025–26	Eredivisie	22	3	3	1	6	0	0	0	31	4
PSV	2026–27	Eredivisie	7	0	0	0	1	0	1 (Note: Appearance in Johan Cruyff Shield)	0	9	0
PSV	Total		29	3	3	1	7	0	1	0	40	4
Career total			101	13	5	2	17	2	1	0	124	17

=== International ===
As of match played 27 September 2026

Appearances and goals by national team and year
National team	Year	Apps	Goals
Austria	2026	9	0
Total		9	0

== Honours ==
Bayern Munich

- Bundesliga: 2022–23

PSV

- Eredivisie: 2025–26

Germany U21

- UEFA European Under-21 Championship runner-up: 2025
