= Daniel Armstrong (footballer, born 2005) =

Finnish footballer (born 2005)

Personal information
- Full name: Daniel Nicholas Armstrong
- Date of birth: 24 March 2005 (age 21)
- Place of birth: Finland
- Height: 1.87 m (6 ft 2 in)
- Positions: Defender; midfielder

Team information
- Current team: Bra (on loan from Atalanta)
- Number: 16

Youth career
- 2009–2022: Ilves
- 2022–2025: Atalanta

Senior career*
Years	Team	Apps	(Gls)
2024–	Atalanta U23	0	(0)
2026–	Atalanta	0	(0)
2026–	→ Bra (loan)	9	(1)

International career^{‡}
2019	Finland U15	5	(0)
2021–2022	Finland U17	5	(1)
2022–2023	Finland U18	8	(0)
2023	Finland U19	4	(0)
2024–	Finland U21	2	(0)
Medal record
Finland U18
First place	Baltic Cup	2023
- * Club domestic league appearances and goals as of 30 April 2026 ‡ National team caps and goals as of 9 June 2024

Daniel Nicholas Armstrong (born 24 March 2005) is a Finnish footballer who plays as a defender and midfielder for Serie D club Bra on loan from Serie A club Atalanta.

== Youth career ==
Armstrong played in the youth sector of Ilves in Tampere, Finland, before joining the youth academy of Serie A club Atalanta on a two-year deal in 2022, for an undisclosed fee.

== Club career ==
On 3 January 2026, Armstrong joined Bra in Serie C on loan.

== International career ==
Armstrong has worn the captain's armband in under-15, under-17 and under-18 youth national team games.

Armstrong was named in the Finland U17 squad for the 2022 UEFA European Under-17 Championship qualification tournament, against Bosnia-Herzegovina, Switzerland and Gibraltar, scoring one goal and providing an assist in three games. Finland finished 2nd in the group and advanced to the Elite round. In March 2022, Armstrong was also named the captain in the Finland U17 squad in the Elite round matches against Portugal, Bulgaria and Ireland.

Armstrong was part of the Finland U18 squad winning the friendly tournament Baltic Cup in June 2023.

In October 2023, Armstrong was part of the Finland U19 squad in the 2024 UEFA European Under-19 Championship qualification tournament, in three games against Romania, Czech Republic and San Marino.

== Personal life ==
Armstrong holds dual Finnish-English citizenship. He is the son of Keith Armstrong, an English-Finnish former professional footballer who has played and coached successfully in Finland for decades.

== Career statistics ==
As of 16 March 2026

Appearances and goals by club, season and competition
Club	Season	League			National cup		League cup (Note: Includes Coppa Italia Serie C)		Europe		Total	
Club	Season	Division	Apps	Goals	Apps	Goals	Apps	Goals	Apps	Goals	Apps	Goals
Atalanta U23	2023–24	Serie C	0	0	0	0	0	0	–		0	0
Atalanta U23	2024–25	Serie C	0	0	0	0	1	0	–		1	0
Atalanta U23	Total		0	0	0	0	1	0	0	0	1	0
Bra (loan)	2025–26	Serie C	5	1	0	0	0	0	–		5	1
Career total			5	1	0	0	1	0	0	0	6	1

== Honours ==
Finland U18

- Baltic Cup: 2023
