= Arlind Kurti =

Albanian footballer (born 2005)

Personal information
- Date of birth: 24 January 2005 (age 21)
- Place of birth: Fier, Albania
- Height: 1.84 m (6 ft 0 in)
- Position: Centre-back

Team information
- Current team: Laçi
- Number: 5

Youth career
- 2014–2015: Apolonia
- 2015–2018: Dogani
- 2018: Fieri
- 2018–2019: Dogani
- 2019: Apollonia 98
- 2019–2020: Dogani
- 2020–2023: Apolonia

Senior career*
Years	Team	Apps	(Gls)
2021–2023	Apolonia	1	(0)
2023–	Laçi	65	(1)

International career^{‡}
2019	Albania U15	2	(0)
2021	Albania U17	9	(0)
2022	Albania U18	2	(0)
2022–2023	Albania U19	17	(0)
2022–	Albania U21	6	(0)
- * Club domestic league appearances and goals as of 27 April 2025 ‡ National team caps and goals as of 8 June 2025

Arlind Kurti (born 24 January 2005) is an Albanian professional footballer who plays as a centre-back for Albanian club KF Laçi.

== Career ==
He made his professional debut on 26 May 2021, the final day of the 2020–21 season, in a 6–1 loss to Teuta who secured the Kategoria Superiore title for the first time in 27 years with the victory. In doing so, he became the youngest ever Kategoria Superiore player at 16 years, 4 months and 2 days, beating the record set by Skënderbeu's Skerdi Xhixho earlier that same day.
