= Oliwier Sławiński =

Polish footballer

Personal information
- Date of birth: 15 April 2005 (age 21)
- Place of birth: Poland
- Height: 1.86 m (6 ft 1 in)
- Position: Forward

Team information
- Current team: Bruk-Bet Termalica
- Number: 11

Youth career
- –2018: Gryf 2009 Tczew
- 2018–2020: Zagłębie Lubin

Senior career*
Years	Team	Apps	(Gls)
2020–2023	Zagłębie Lubin II	39	(1)
2021–2023	Zagłębie Lubin	3	(0)
2023–2025	ŁKS Łódź II	47	(5)
2023–2025	ŁKS Łódź	2	(0)
2025–2026	Stal Rzeszów	29	(4)
2026–	Bruk-Bet Termalica	0	(0)

International career
2018	Poland U14	1	(1)
2019	Poland U15	5	(3)
2021	Poland U16	2	(2)
2021–2022	Poland U17	18	(7)
2022	Poland U18	3	(1)
- * Club domestic league appearances and goals as of 17:23, 24 May 2026 (UTC)

Oliwier Sławiński (born 15 April 2005) is a Polish professional footballer who plays as a forward for I liga club Bruk-Bet Termalica Nieciecza.

== Career statistics ==
As of match played 24 May 2026

Appearances and goals by club, season and competition
Club	Season	League			Polish Cup		Continental		Other		Total	
Club	Season	Division	Apps	Goals	Apps	Goals	Apps	Goals	Apps	Goals	Apps	Goals
Zagłębie Lubin II	2020–21	III liga, gr. III	9	0	—		—		—		9	0
Zagłębie Lubin II	2021–22	III liga, gr. III	16	1	—		—		—		16	1
Zagłębie Lubin II	2022–23	II liga	14	0	—		—		—		14	0
Zagłębie Lubin II	Total		39	1	—		—		—		39	1
Zagłębie Lubin	2021–22	Ekstraklasa	3	0	1	0	—		—		4	0
ŁKS Łódź II	2023–24	II liga	20	2	—		—		—		20	2
ŁKS Łódź II	2024–25	II liga	27	3	2	1	—		—		29	4
ŁKS Łódź II	Total		47	5	2	1	—		—		49	6
ŁKS Łódź	2023–24	Ekstraklasa	1	0	0	0	—		—		1	0
ŁKS Łódź	2024–25	I liga	1	0	0	0	—		—		1	0
ŁKS Łódź	Total		2	0	0	0	—		—		2	0
Stal Rzeszów	2025–26	I liga	29	4	1	0	—		—		30	4
Bruk-Bet Termalica	2026–27	I liga	0	0	0	0	—		—		0	0
Career total			120	10	4	1	—		—		124	11

== Honours ==
Zagłębie Lubin II

- III liga, group III: 2021–22
- Polish Cup (Legnica regionals): 2020–21, 2021–22
