= Roberto Raychev =

Bulgarian footballer (born 2005)

Personal information
- Full name: Roberto Iliev Raychev
- Date of birth: 7 December 2005 (age 20)
- Place of birth: Sofia, Bulgaria
- Height: 1.80 m (5 ft 11 in)
- Positions: Second striker; forward

Team information
- Current team: Slavia Sofia
- Number: 7

Youth career
- 2012–2023: Slavia Sofia

Senior career*
Years	Team	Apps	(Gls)
2022–2025	Slavia Sofia II	35	(21)
2023–	Slavia Sofia	99	(12)

International career^{‡}
2021–2023	Bulgaria U17	14	(4)
2022–	Bulgaria U21	23	(1)
- * Club domestic league appearances and goals as of 10 November 2026 ‡ National team caps and goals as of 11:42, 16 December 2025 (UTC)

Roberto Raychev (Bulgarian: Роберто Райчев; born 7 December 2005) is a Bulgarian professional footballer who plays as a forward for First League club Slavia Sofia.

== Career ==
Nikolov began his career with Slavia Sofia at age of 7. In 2022 Raychev was promoted to the second team of Slavia, playing in Third League. On 30 September 2022 he scored 5 goals in a league match against CSKA 1948 III. Roberto made his professional debut on 19 February 2023 in a league match against Ludogorets Razgrad. He scored his debut goal for Slavia's first team on 6 June 2023 in a league match against Lokomotiv Sofia.

== International career ==
In 2021 he was part of Bulgaria U17 and helped the team to qualify for European tournament.

== Personal life ==
Raychev's father is the retired footballer Iliya Iliev and was named after Roberto Mancini.

== Career statistics ==
=== Club ===
As of 13 November 2026

Club performance			League		Cup		Continental		Other		Total	
Club	League	Season	Apps	Goals	Apps	Goals	Apps	Goals	Apps	Goals	Apps	Goals
Bulgaria			League		Bulgarian Cup		Europe		Other		Total	
Slavia Sofia II	Third League	2022–23	22	16	–		–		–		22	16
Slavia Sofia II	Third League	2023–24	10	4	–		–		–		10	4
Slavia Sofia II	Third League	2024–25	2	1	–		–		–		2	1
Slavia Sofia II	Third League	2025–26	1	0	–		–		–		1	0
Slavia Sofia II	Total		35	21	0	0	0	0	0	0	35	21
Slavia Sofia	First League	2022–23	4	1	0	0	–		–		4	1
Slavia Sofia	First League	2023–24	22	1	1	0	–		–		23	1
Slavia Sofia	First League	2024–25	26	5	1	0	–		–		27	5
Slavia Sofia	First League	2025–26	33	4	2	0	–		–		35	4
Slavia Sofia	First League	2026–27	14	1	1	0	–		–		15	1
Slavia Sofia	Total		99	12	5	0	0	0	0	0	104	12
Career statistics			134	33	5	0	0	0	0	0	139	33
