= Oleksiy Husyev =

Ukrainian footballer (born 2005)

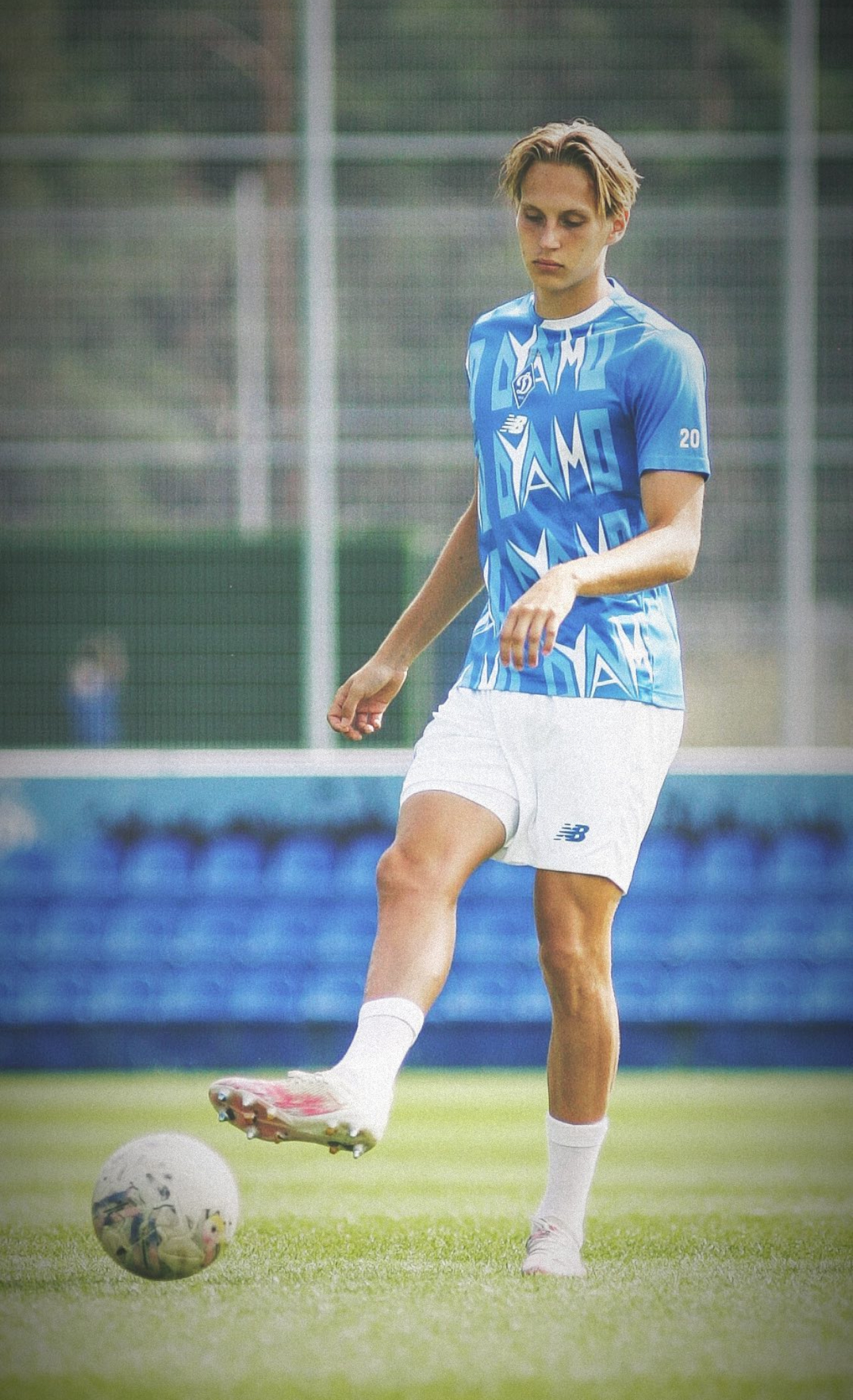

Personal information
- Full name: Oleksiy Olehovych Husyev
- Date of birth: 16 March 2005 (age 21)
- Place of birth: Kyiv, Ukraine
- Height: 1.79 m (5 ft 10 in)
- Position: Defender

Team information
- Current team: Chornomorets Odesa (on loan from Dynamo Kyiv)
- Number: 23

Youth career
- 2018–2023: Dynamo Kyiv

Senior career*
Years	Team	Apps	(Gls)
2023–	Dynamo Kyiv	0	(0)
2024	→ Zorya Luhansk (loan)	2	(0)
2025	→ Metalist 1925 Kharkiv (loan)	0	(0)
2025	→ Metalist 1925-2 Kharkiv (loan)	2	(0)
2025–2026	→ Kudrivka (loan)	15	(0)
2026–	→ Chornomorets Odesa (loan)	4	(0)

International career^{‡}
2021–2022	Ukraine U17	10	(5)
2023–2024	Ukraine U19	11	(0)
2025–	Ukraine U20	7	(0)
2024–	Ukraine U21	6	(0)
- * Club domestic league appearances and goals as of 17 October 2026 ‡ National team caps and goals as of 3 May 2026

Oleksiy Olehovych Husyev (Ukrainian: Олексій Олегович Гусєв; born 16 March 2005) is a Ukrainian professional footballer who plays as an defender for Ukrainian club Chornomorets Odesa, on loan from Dynamo Kyiv.

== Club career ==
=== Early career ===
Husyev started playing football at the academies of Dynamo Kyiv junior squads and Academy.

=== Dynamo Kyiv ===
In 2023 he was included in Dynamo Kyiv's senior team. On 25 February 2024 he included in the bench against Metalist 1925 Kharkiv without playing.

On 1 August 2024, he was loaned to Zorya Luhansk. On 21 September 2024, he made his debut in Ukrainian Cup against Olimpiya Savyntsi at the Yunist Stadium in Horishni Plavni. 21 September 2024, he made his debut in Ukrainian Premier League against Karpaty Lviv at the Valeriy Lobanovskyi Dynamo Stadium in Kiev.

In July 2025 he moved on loan to Metalist 1925 Kharkiv in Ukrainian First League. He also played for Metalist 1925-2 Kharkiv in Ukrainian Second League.

In July 2025 he moved on loan to Kudrivka just promoted in Ukrainian Premier League. On 23 November 2024, he made his debut with his new club against Poltava, replacing Oleksandr Kozak.

On 8 August 2025, Husyev joined Chornomorets Odesa, on a loan deal until the end of the 2026–27 season.

== International career ==
In 2021 he was called up by the Ukraine under-17 team where on 26 August 2021, he made his debut Armenia under-17 team scoring one goal. On 23 April 2022 he also scored against Poland under-17 team for the qualification for 2022 UEFA European Under-17 Championship at the Stadio Gino Manni in Colle di Val d'Elsa. On 13 September 2025, he was called up by the Ukraine under-20 team for the 2025 FIFA U-20 World Cup. On 27 September 2025, he made his debut in 2025 FIFA U-20 World Cup against South Korea at the Estadio Elías Figueroa Brander in Valparaíso.

== Personal life ==
His father Oleh Husiev was also a professional football player.

== Career statistics ==
As of match played 17 October 2026

Appearances and goals by club, season and competition
Club	Season	League			Cup		Europe		Other		Total	
Club	Season	Division	Apps	Goals	Apps	Goals	Apps	Goals	Apps	Goals	Apps	Goals
Zorya Luhansk (loan)	2024–25	Ukrainian Premier League	1	0	1	0	0	0	0	0	2	0
Metalist 1925 Kharkiv (Loan)	2024–25	Ukrainian First League	0	0	0	0	0	0	0	0	0	0
Metalist 1925-2 Kharkiv (Loan)	2024–25	Ukrainian Second League	2	0	0	0	0	0	0	0	2	0
Kudrivka (Loan)	2025–26	Ukrainian Premier League	15	0	1	0	0	0	0	0	16	0
Chornomorets Odesa (Loan)	2026–27	Ukrainian Premier League	4	0	0	0	0	0	0	0	4	0
Career total			22	0	2	0	0	0	0	0	24	0
