= Vincent Burlet =

Belgian footballer (born 2005)

Personal information
- Date of birth: 23 September 2005 (age 21)
- Place of birth: Liège, Belgium
- Height: 1.80 m (5 ft 11 in)
- Position: Defender

Team information
- Current team: Cracovia
- Number: 28

Youth career
- Union Momalloise
- –2021: Sint-Truidense VV
- 2021–2022: Schalke 04
- 2022–2024: Lille

Senior career*
Years	Team	Apps	(Gls)
2022–2024	Lille B	41	(0)
2024–2026	Lille	1	(0)
2024–2025	→ Le Mans (loan)	23	(3)
2025	→ Reims (loan)	0	(0)
2025–2026	→ Boulogne (loan)	17	(2)
2026–	Cracovia	9	(0)

International career^{‡}
2021–2022	Belgium U17	8	(1)
2022–2023	Belgium U18	4	(0)
2023–2024	Belgium U19	7	(0)
2025–	Belgium U21	4	(0)
- * Club domestic league appearances and goals as of 14:03, 9 November 2026 (UTC) ‡ National team caps and goals as of 23:19, 17 November 2026 (UTC)

Vincent Burlet (born 23 September 2005) is a Belgian professional footballer who plays as a defender for Ekstraklasa club Cracovia.

== Early life ==
Burlet was born on 23 September 2005. Born in Liège, Belgium, he is a native of the city.

== Club career ==
As a youth player, Burlet joined the youth academy of Belgian side Union Momalloise. Following his stint there, he joined the youth academy of Belgian side Sint-Truidense VV. In 2021, he joined the youth academy of German side Schalke 04, helping the club's under-17 team win the league title.

Ahead of the 2022–23 season, he joined the youth academy of French Ligue 1 side Lille and was promoted to the club's senior team in 2024. The same year, he was sent on loan to French side Le Mans, where he made twenty-three league appearances and scored three goals.

Upon the return from loan, Burlet made his Ligue 1 debut for Lille on 17 August 2025 against Brest.

On 1 September 2025, Burlet moved on loan to Reims in Ligue 2.

On 1 November 2025, after his loan to Reims was terminated since he had not played a single game, Bourlet was loaned to Boulogne in Ligue 2.

On 15 July 2026, Burlet signed a contract with Cracovia in Poland for four seasons, with an optional fifth season.

== International career ==
Burlet is a Belgium youth international. During the summer of 2022, he played for the Belgium national under-17 football team at the 2022 UEFA European Under-17 Championship.

== Style of play ==
Burlet plays as a defender and is left-footed. French news website Le11hdf wrote in 2025 that "used in a left-sided role... [he] shows a fine technical range and, above all, a real ability to hit the ball at his feet.
