= Alessio Vacca =

Italian footballer (born 2005)

Personal information
- Date of birth: 15 June 2005 (age 21)
- Place of birth: Trecate, Italy
- Height: 1.77 m (5 ft 10 in)
- Position: Forward

Team information
- Current team: Folgore Caratese (on loan from Juventus)
- Number: 10

Youth career
- Novara
- 2014–2025: Juventus
- 2022–2023: → Monza (loan)

Senior career*
Years	Team	Apps	(Gls)
2025–	Juventus Next Gen	14	(1)
2025–2026	→ Dolomiti Bellunesi (loan)	12	(0)
2026–	→ Folgore Caratese (loan)	1	(0)

International career^{‡}
2021–2022	Italy U17	14	(2)
2022	Italy U18	1	(0)
2023	Italy U19	3	(1)
2024–2025	Italy U20	2	(2)
- * Club domestic league appearances and goals as of 24 August 2026 ‡ National team caps and goals as of 15 April 2026

Alessio Vacca (born 15 June 2005) is an Italian professional footballer who plays as a forward for Serie C Group A club Folgore Caratese on loan from Juventus.

== Club career ==
Born in Trecate, in the Province of Novara, Vacca is a youth product of Juventus' academy, which he joined from Novara in 2019. He also spent a loan term with Monza's academy in the Primavera 2.

In July 2024, he signed his first professional contract with Juventus, as he had emerged as one of the main prospects of his generation in the Torinese academy along his friend Kenan Yıldız.

In the following seasons, he proceeded to become the main goalscorer of the Primavera team.

Vacca made his professional debut with Juventus' reserve team in a 1–1 Serie C draw with Carpi on 23 August 2025, scoring a goal on debut. Having also delivered his first assist in the following game against Livorno, he extended his contract with Juventus Next Gen until 2028.

In January 2026, he was loaned to Dolomiti Bellunesi in Serie C for the 2025–26 season, tasked with helping the club survive a relegation battle.

== International career ==
Vacca is a youth international for Italy, having played for the under-17, under-18, under-19 and under-20, with whom he scored a braced on debut in a 3–2 win away against Poland in November 2024.

== Career stats ==
Appearances and goals by club, season and competition
Club	Season	League			Coppa Italia		Other		Total	
Club	Season	Division	Apps	Goals	Apps	Goals	Apps	Goals	Apps	Goals
Juventus Next Gen	2025–26	Serie C	15	2	—		1 (Note: Appearance in Coppa Italia Serie C)	0	16	2
Dolomiti Bellunesi (loan)	2025–26	Serie C	12	0	—		—		12	0
Career total			27	2	—		1	0	28	2
