= Jasse Jalonen =

Finnish footballer (born 1973)

Personal information
- Full name: Jasse Jalonen
- Date of birth: 18 July 1973 (age 53)
- Place of birth: Turku, Finland
- Height: 1.79 m (5 ft 10 in)
- Position: Midfielder

Senior career*
Years	Team	Apps	(Gls)
1992–1995	TPS	74	(6)
1996–1997	MyPa	20	(0)
1997	Flora	8	(0)
1998	KTP	24	(6)
1999	VPS	19	(1)
2000–2001	TPS	54	(4)

International career^{‡}
1995–1996	Finland	6	(0)
- * Club domestic league appearances and goals as of 13 July 2008 ‡ National team caps and goals as of 13 July 2008

Jasse Jalonen (born 18 July 1973) is a Finnish former professional footballer who played the position of midfielder. He is a former member of the Finland national football team.

== Personal life ==
His son Jasper Jalonen is a footballer for Salon Palloilijat (SalPa).

== Career statistics ==
As of 18 May 2024

Appearances and goals by club, season and competition
Club	Season	League			Europe		Total	
Club	Season	Division	Apps	Goals	Apps	Goals	Apps	Goals
TPS	1992	Veikkausliiga	29	3	1 (Note: Includes UEFA Cup Winners' Cup)	0	30	3
TPS	1993	Veikkausliiga	3	0	–		3	0
TPS	1994	Veikkausliiga	18	2	–		3	0
TPS	1995	Veikkausliiga	24	1	2	0	26	1
TPS	Total		74	6	3	0	77	6
MyPa	1996	Veikkausliiga	15	0	3	0	18	0
MyPa	1997	Veikkausliiga	5	0	0	0	5	0
MyPa	Total		20	0	3	0	23	0
Flora Tallinn	1997–98	Meistriliiga	8	0	0	0	8	0
KTP	1998	Ykkönen	24	6	–		24	6
VPS	1999	Veikkausliiga	19	1	2 (Note: Includes UEFA Cup)	0	21	1
TPS	2000	Veikkausliiga	25	0	–		25	0
TPS	2001	Ykkönen	29	4	–		8	0
TPS	Total		54	4	–	–	54	4
Career total			199	17	8	0	207	17
