= Matei Moraru =

Romanian footballer (born 2005)

Personal information
- Full name: Leonard Matei Moraru
- Date of birth: 31 July 2005 (age 21)
- Place of birth: Piatra Neamț, Romania
- Height: 1.75 m (5 ft 9 in)
- Position: Winger

Team information
- Current team: Inter Sibiu

Youth career
- –2016: LPS Piatra Neamț
- 2016–2023: Universitatea Cluj

Senior career*
Years	Team	Apps	(Gls)
2020–2026	Universitatea Cluj	7	(0)
2023–2024	→ Ceahlăul Piatra Neamț (loan)	14	(5)
2024–2025	→ FC U Craiova (loan)	4	(0)
2026–	Inter Sibiu	0	(0)

International career^{‡}
2020–2021	Romania U16	6	(1)
2021–2022	Romania U17	8	(1)
2024	Romania U19	1	(0)
- * Club domestic league appearances and goals as of 30 November 2025 ‡ National team caps and goals as of 30 November 2025

Leonard Matei Moraru (born 31 July 2005) is a Romanian professional footballer who plays as a winger for Liga III club Inter Sibiu.

== Career statistics ==
As of 7 October 2024

Appearances and goals by club, season and competition
Club	Season	League			Cupa României		Europe		Other		Total	
Club	Season	Division	Apps	Goals	Apps	Goals	Apps	Goals	Apps	Goals	Apps	Goals
Universitatea Cluj	2020–21	Liga II	1	0	2	0	—		—		3	0
Universitatea Cluj	2021–22	Liga II	4	0	0	0	—		0	0	4	0
Universitatea Cluj	2022–23	Liga I	0	0	0	0	—		—		0	0
Universitatea Cluj	2024–25	Liga I	2	0	1	0	—		—		3	0
Universitatea Cluj	2025–26	Liga I	0	0	0	0	—		—		0	0
Universitatea Cluj	Total		7	0	3	0	—		0	0	10	0
Ceahlăul Piatra Neamț (loan)	2023–24	Liga II	14	5	2	0	—		—		16	5
FC U Craiova (loan)	2023–24	Liga II	4	0	—		—		—		4	0
Inter Sibiu	2026–27	Liga III	0	0	—		—		—		0	0
Career total			25	5	5	0	—		0	0	30	5
