= Ussumane Djaló =

Portuguese footballer (born 2005)

Personal information
- Date of birth: 6 January 2005 (age 21)
- Place of birth: Guinea-Bissau
- Height: 1.74 m (5 ft 9 in)
- Position: Midfielder

Team information
- Current team: SJK
- Number: 37

Youth career
- –2018: Ponte Frielas
- 2018–2022: Benfica
- 2022–2024: Porto
- 2024: → Southampton (loan)
- 2024–2025: Torino

Senior career*
Years	Team	Apps	(Gls)
2023–2024	Porto B	9	(0)
2025–2026	Mafra	2	(0)
2026–	SJK	1	(0)

International career^{‡}
2019	Portugal U15	3	(1)
2021	Portugal U16	4	(1)
2021–2022	Portugal U17	13	(1)
2022–2023	Portugal U18	11	(1)
2023–2024	Portugal U19	10	(0)
- * Club domestic league appearances and goals as of 21 February 2026 ‡ National team caps and goals as of 26 March 2024

Ussumane Djaló (born 6 January 2005) is a professional footballer who plays as a midfielder for SJK. Born in Guinea-Bissau, he is a Portugal youth international.

== Early life ==
Djaló was born on 6 January 2005. Born in Guinea-Bissau, he moved with his family to Portugal at the age of thirteen.

== Club career ==
As a youth player, Djaló joined the youth academy of Portuguese side Ponte Frielas. Following his stint there, he joined the youth academy of Portuguese side Benfica in 2018. Four years later, he joined the youth academy of Portuguese side Porto, where he played in the UEFA Youth League and was promoted to the club's reserve team in 2023, where he made nine league appearances and scored zero goals.

In 2024, he was sent on loan to the youth academy of English Premier League side Southampton, before joining the youth academy of Italian Serie A side Torino the same year. Subsequently, he signed for Portuguese side Mafra in 2025, where he made two league appearances and scored zero goals. Ahead of the 2026 season, he signed for Finnish side SJK.

== International career ==
Djaló is a Portugal youth international. During May 2022, he played for the Portugal national under-17 football team at the 2022 UEFA European Under-17 Championship.
