= Mate Ivković =

Croatian footballer (born 2006)

Personal information
- Date of birth: 4 January 2006 (age 20)
- Place of birth: Split, Croatia
- Height: 1.91 m (6 ft 3 in)
- Position: Midfielder

Team information
- Current team: Sampdoria (U20)

Youth career
- Years: Team
- –2021: Hajduk
- 2022–2025: Roma
- 2025–: Sampdoria

Mate Ivković (born 4 January 2006) is a Croatian professional footballer who plays as a midfielder for the Under-20 squad of Italian Serie B club Sampdoria.

== Early life ==
He was born in 2006 in Split, Croatia. He has been described as "considered one of the best young players in his country".

== Club career ==
As a youth player, he joined the youth academy of Croatian side Hajduk. In 2022, he joined the youth academy of Italian Serie A side Roma. The transfer was described as "could have left for free in the summer, but Roma wanted him immediately and had no problem paying compensation. The fixed part of the compensation amounts to 500 thousand euros, and Hajduk is also entitled to the development fee prescribed by FIFA, so Hajduk's total earnings in this business are 670 thousand euros". He has trained with the first team of the club.

On 3 February 2025, Ivković joined UC Sampdoria.

== International career ==
He represented Croatia internationally at youth level.

== Style of play ==
He mainly operates as a midfielder. He has been described as "said to excel in various positions, was given roles in several game modules and was always the main point of reference in the game. The defensive midfielder can be on his own, but also on the left side when it comes to a formation with two "sixes". When he's on form, he's really hard to stop: he has long levers, tactical sense, a great personality, gets into dribbles easily, creates numerical superiority. The technique is more than good, they say he also has a great shot from a distance".
