= Zanos Savva =

Cypriot footballer (born 2005)

Personal information
- Date of birth: 26 November 2005 (age 20)
- Place of birth: Nicosia, Cyprus
- Height: 1.88 m (6 ft 2 in)
- Position: Winger

Team information
- Current team: Olympiakos Nicosia
- Number: 9

Youth career
- –2022: Olympiakos Nicosia
- 2022–2024: Torino

Senior career*
| Years | Team | Apps | (Gls) |
| 2022 | Olympiakos Nicosia | 4 | (0) |
| 2023–2026 | Torino | 2 | (1) |
| 2026– | Olympiakos Nicosia | 4 | (3) |

International career^{‡}
| 2021 | Cyprus U17 | 4 | (1) |
| 2023– | Cyprus U21 | 6 | (1) |
| 2026– | Cyprus | 1 | (0) |
- * Club domestic league appearances and goals as of 7 November 2026 ‡ National team caps and goals as of 15 November 2026

Zanos Savva (Greek: Ζανος Σαββα; born 26 November 2005) is a Cypriot professional footballer who played as a winger for Italian Serie A club Torino and the Cyprus national team.

== Career ==
Savva started his career with Cypriot side Olympiakos Nicosia. In 2022, he signed for Italian Serie A side Torino.

=== International ===
As of match played 15 November 2026

Appearances and goals by national team and year
| National team | Year | Apps | Goals |
|---|---|---|---|
| Cyprus | 2026 | 1 | 0 |
| Total | | 1 | 0 |

== Style of play ==
Savva mainly operates as a winger. He is left-footed.

== Personal life ==
Savva was born in 2005 in Nicosia, Cyprus. He has had two pet dogs.
