= Víctor Moreno (footballer) =

Spanish footballer (born 2005)

Personal information
- Full name: Víctor Moreno Alcalá
- Date of birth: 30 September 2005 (age 21)
- Place of birth: Granada, Spain
- Height: 1.74 m (5 ft 9 in)
- Position: Winger

Team information
- Current team: Tenerife

Youth career
- Atarfe Industrial
- 2012–2013: Maracena
- 2013–2014: Granada
- 2014–2019: Villarreal
- 2019–2020: Roda
- 2020–2021: Villarreal
- 2021–2022: Roda
- 2022–2023: Villarreal

Senior career*
Years	Team	Apps	(Gls)
2023–2026	Villarreal B	56	(6)
2026	→ Cultural Leonesa (loan)	16	(2)
2026–	Tenerife	0	(0)

International career
2021–2022	Spain U17	11	(1)
2022–	Spain U18	2	(0)
- * Club domestic league appearances and goals as of 31 May 2026

Víctor Moreno Alcalá (born 30 September 2005) is a Spanish footballer who plays as a winger for CD Tenerife.

== Club career ==
Born in Granada, Andalusia, Moreno joined Villarreal CF's youth setup in 2014, after representing Granada CF, UD Maracena and Atarfe Industrial CF. In July 2023, after finishing his formation, he was promoted straight to the reserves in Segunda División.

Moreno made his professional debut with the B's on 12 August 2023, coming on as a late substitute for Rodri in a 2–0 away loss to Real Zaragoza. He scored his first professional goal the following 2 June, netting the winner in a 1–0 home success over Racing de Santander, as his side was already relegated.

On 20 January 2026, Moreno was loaned to second division side Cultural y Deportiva Leonesa until June. On 11 July, after suffering relegation, he moved to fellow league team CD Tenerife on a three-year contract.

== International career ==
Moreno represented Spain at under-17 and under-18 levels.
