= Dinis Rodrigues =

Portuguese footballer

Personal information
- Full name: José Dinis Pinto Magalhães Rodrigues
- Date of birth: 14 July 2005 (age 21)
- Place of birth: Maia, Portugal
- Height: 1.85 m (6 ft 1 in)
- Position: Forward

Team information
- Current team: Eldense (on loan from Napoli)
- Number: 29

Youth career
- 2014–2015: Gondim-Maia
- 2015–2018: Maia Lidador
- 2018–2019: Palmeiras Braga
- 2019–2024: Braga

Senior career*
Years	Team	Apps	(Gls)
2022–2025	Braga B	21	(0)
2025–2026	Sion II	10	(4)
2025–2026	Sion	1	(0)
2026	→ Penafiel (loan)	3	(0)
2026–	Napoli	0	(0)
2026–	→ Eldense (loan)	0	(0)

International career
2019	Portugal U15	3	(1)
2021	Portugal U16	2	(2)
2021–2022	Portugal U17	17	(12)
2022–2023	Portugal U18	12	(3)
2023–2024	Portugal U20	6	(3)
- * Club domestic league appearances and goals as of 17 August 2026

José Dinis Pinto Magalhães Rodrigues (born 14 July 2005) is a Portuguese professional footballer who plays as a forward for Segunda División club Eldense, on loan from Serie A club Napoli.

== Club career ==
Born in Maia, Rodrigues played for hometown sides Gondim-Maia and Maia Lidador before moving to the city of Braga in 2018, where he represented Palmeiras Braga and SC Braga. He made his senior debut with the latter's reserves on 26 November 2022, coming on as a second-half substitute in a 2–1 Liga 3 home loss to Montalegre.

On 1 August 2024, after playing for Braga's under-19, under-23 and B-team squads, Rodrigues renewed his contract with the club until 2027. The following 18 July, however, he moved abroad and joined Swiss Super League side Sion.

On 2 February 2026, after just one first team appearance, Rodrigues returned to his home country after being loaned out to Liga Portugal 2 side Penafiel. On 1 September, he signed for Serie A side Napoli, and was announced on loan at Segunda División team Eldense four days later.

== International career ==
Rodrigues represented Portugal up to the under-20 level, scoring 21 goals in all categories.
