= Kevin Zefi =

Irish footballer (born 2005)

Personal information
- Date of birth: 11 February 2005 (age 21)
- Place of birth: Dublin, Ireland
- Height: 1.78 m (5 ft 10 in)
- Position: Winger

Team information
- Current team: Sligo Rovers
- Number: 77

Youth career
- –2019: St. Kevin's Boys
- 2019–2021: Shamrock Rovers
- 2021–2024: Inter Milan
- 2024–2025: Roma

Senior career*
| Years | Team | Apps | (Gls) |
| 2020 | Shamrock Rovers II | 11 | (2) |
| 2026– | Sligo Rovers | 5 | (0) |

International career^{‡}
| 2019–2020 | Republic of Ireland U15 | 4 | (2) |
| 2021–2022 | Republic of Ireland U17 | 6 | (1) |
| 2021–2023 | Republic of Ireland U19 | 11 | (1) |
| 2024 | Republic of Ireland U21 | 1 | (0) |
- * Club domestic league appearances and goals as of 11:39, 10 November 2026 (UTC) ‡ National team caps and goals as of 21:10, 17 November 2024 (UTC)

Kevin Zefi (born 11 February 2005) is an Irish professional footballer who plays as a winger for Sligo Rovers.

== Early and personal life ==
Zefi was born in Dublin and grew up in the Clonsilla area. He attended Luttrellstown Community College. He is of Albanian descent.

== Club career ==
Zefi began his career with Shamrock Rovers. In 2020 he was linked with a transfer away from the club, with Italian club Inter Milan and Dutch club PSV said to be interested.

He began his senior career with Shamrock Rovers II in the League of Ireland First Division in the 2020 season, becoming the youngest ever scorer in the League of Ireland, at the age of 15 years 206 days. He had also been Shamrock Rovers II's youngest ever player, until that record was beaten by 14-year-old Sam Curtis in October 2020.

He moved to Italian club Inter Milan in August 2021. In December 2021 he scored a hat-trick for Inter's youth team.

In February 2022 he spoke positively about his move to Italy, encouraging other young Irish players to do the same.

In January 2024, Zefi joined fellow Italian club Roma on a permanent deal on a 3-year contract.

In July 2025, Zefi left Roma and became a free agent, having stated that he suffered repeated racist abuse in Italy due to his Irish-Albanian heritage, which impacted his prospects at the club.

On 15 July 2025, Zefi went on trial with League of Ireland Premier Division club Sligo Rovers, scoring for them in a friendly against EFL League One club Mansfield Town. In May 2026 he signed for Sligo Rovers until the end of the season. At the end of the season Sligo confirmed that Zefi had left the club following the end of his contract.

== International career ==
=== Republic of Ireland ===
Zefi has represented the Republic of Ireland at under-15, under-17 and under-19 level. On 7 November 2024, he received a call-up to the national under-21 team for the friendly matches against Sweden. His debut with Republic of Ireland U21 came ten days later in the second friendly match against Sweden after coming on as a substitute in the 71st minute in place of Jad Hakiki.

=== Albania ===
On 16 March 2025, Zefi confirmed that he received a call-up from Albania national under-21 team for the friendly matches against Greece and Luxembourg, but was unable to join the national team due to injury.
