= Álvaro Ginés =

Spanish footballer

Personal information
- Full name: Álvaro Ginés Hernández Sánchez
- Date of birth: 15 March 2005 (age 21)
- Place of birth: Cartagena, Spain
- Height: 1.77 m (5 ft 10 in)
- Position: Forward

Team information
- Current team: Real Madrid C
- Number: 7

Youth career
- 2015–2017: Ciudad Jardín EF
- 2015–2020: Cartagena
- 2020–2024: Real Madrid

Senior career*
Years	Team	Apps	(Gls)
2024–	Real Madrid C	52	(2)
2025–	Real Madrid Castilla	7	(1)

International career^{‡}
	Spain U16	0	(0)
2021–2022	Spain U17	9	(3)
2022	Spain U18	3	(0)
- * Club domestic league appearances and goals as of 7 May 2026 ‡ National team caps and goals as of 26 September 2022

Álvaro Ginés Hernández Sánchez (born 15 March 2005) is a Spanish professional footballer who plays as a forward for Real Madrid C.

== Club career ==
Ginés was a youth product of Ciudad Jardín EF and Cartagena before joining Real Madrid's youth setup in 2020. A prolific goalscorer, he has scored over 100 goals youth sides since joining Real Madrid. In September 2022, he was named by English newspaper The Guardian as one of the best players born in 2005 worldwide.

== International career ==
Ginés is a youth international for Spain, having represented the country at the U17 and U18 levels.

== Playing style ==
Ginés is a small goalscorer who plays a physical game. He can also link up well and can operate with back-to-goal, earning playstyle comparisons to Karim Benzema.
