= Jasper Jalonen =

Finnish footballer (born 2005)

Personal information
- Date of birth: 20 June 2005 (age 21)
- Place of birth: Finland
- Position: Midfielder

Team information
- Current team: SalPa
- Number: 7

Youth career
- –2021: TPS

Senior career*
Years	Team	Apps	(Gls)
2021–2022	TPS	15	(1)
2022–2023	Klubi 04	9	(1)
2023	SJK Akatemia	0	(0)
2024–	SalPa	11	(0)

International career
2019	Finland U15	3	(0)
2021–2022	Finland U17	10	(2)
2022	Finland U18	5	(1)
- * Club domestic league appearances and goals as of 26 October 2024

Jasper Jalonen (born 20 June 2005) is a Finnish professional footballer who plays as a midfielder for Ykkösliiga club Salon Palloilijat (SalPa).

== Personal life ==
His father Jasse Jalonen is a former professional footballer who has also played for TPS. His grandfather Jouni Jalonen won four Finnish Championship titles with TPS in 1968, 1971, 1972 and 1975, and was named to the TPS Hall of Fame.

== Career statistics ==
As of 26 October 2024

Club	Season	League			Finnish Cup		League cup		Total	
Club	Season	Division	Apps	Goals	Apps	Goals	Apps	Goals	Apps	Goals
TPS	2021	Ykkönen	5	0	3	0	–		8	0
TPS	2022	Ykkönen	10	1	2	0	6	1	18	2
TPS	Total		15	1	5	0	6	1	26	2
TPS Akatemia	2022	Kolmonen	1	0	–		–		1	0
Klubi 04	2022	Kakkonen	8	1	—		—		8	1
Klubi 04	2023	Kakkonen	1	0	—		—		1	0
Klubi 04	Total		9	1	—		–		9	1
SJK Akatemia	2023	Ykkönen	0	0	0	0	0	0	0	0
SJK Akatemia 2	2023	Kolmonen	9	1	–		–		9	1
SalPa	2024	Ykkösliiga	11	0	2	0	2	0	15	0
Career Total			45	3	7	0	8	1	61	4
