= Fredrik Nissen =

Swedish footballer (born 2005)

Personal information
- Full name: Fredrik Philip Ferdinand Nissen
- Date of birth: 28 March 2005 (age 21)
- Height: 1.89 m (6 ft 2 in)
- Position: Centre-back

Team information
- Current team: AIK
- Number: 14

Youth career
- –2021: IF Brommapojkarna
- 2023–2025: AC Milan

Senior career*
Years	Team	Apps	(Gls)
2022–2023	IF Brommapojkarna	13	(0)
2023	→ Täby FK (loan)	4	(0)
2025–	AIK	8	(0)

International career^{‡}
2021–2022	Sweden U17	14	(3)
2022–2023	Sweden U19	9	(1)
- * Club domestic league appearances and goals as of 24 August 2026 ‡ National team caps and goals as of 24 August 2026

Fredrik Nissen (born 28 March 2005) is a Swedish footballer who plays as a centre-back for AIK.

== Career ==
Nissen started playing for IF Brommapojkarna as a young child, and made it to the senior squad ahead of the 2022 season. He made his international debut for Sweden U16 in a double fixture against Denmark U16 in August 2021. He later took part in the 2022 UEFA European Under-17 Championship. Nissen notably scored a hat-trick against Lithuania during qualifying.

Nissen also went on a short-term loan to Täby FK, playing in central defence alongside Zinedin Smajlovic. Following 10 matches in the 2023 Allsvenskan, Nissen was bought by AC Milan Primavera.

In August 2025, Karlsson was bought back to Sweden by another Stockholm club, AIK. In November 2025, Nissen was called up to Sweden U21 for the first time, but pulled out. He missed the first half of 2026 due to injury, returning to play in July 2026.
