= Halil Özdemir =

Turkish footballer (born 1995)

Personal information
- Date of birth: 18 August 2005 (age 21)
- Place of birth: Antwerp, Belgium
- Height: 1.77 m (5 ft 10 in)
- Position: Attacking midfielder

Team information
- Current team: Mechelen
- Number: 21

Youth career
- 2013–2014: KV Olympic Deurne
- 2014–2016: Lyra TSV
- 2016–2017: KSC City Pirates
- 2017–2018: Berchem
- 2018–2020: Beerschot
- 2020–2022: Mechelen

Senior career*
| Years | Team | Apps | (Gls) |
| 2022– | Mechelen II | 60 | (17) |
| 2025– | Mechelen | 7 | (0) |

International career
| 2022 | Turkey U17 | 10 | (2) |
| 2022–2023 | Turkey U18 | 7 | (1) |
| 2024 | Turkey U19 | 12 | (3) |
- * Club domestic league appearances and goals as of 02:36, 28 December 2025 (UTC)

Halil Özdemir (born 18 August 2005) is a professional footballer who plays as an attacking midfielder for Belgian Pro League club Mechelen. Born in Belgium, he is a youth international for Turkey.

== Club career ==
Özdemir is a product of the youth academies of the Belgian clubs KV Olympic Deurne, Lyra TSV, KSC City Pirates, Berchem, Beerschot and Mechelen. In 2022, he was promoted to Mechelen's reserves in the Belgian Division 2. On 24 July 2025, he signed a professional contract with Mechelen for 2+1 seasons. On 26 July 2025, he made his professional debut with Mechelen as a substitute in a 1–1 Belgian Pro League tie with Zulte Waregem.

== International career ==
Born in Belgium, Özdemir is of Turkish descent and holds dual Belgian and Turkish citizenship. He was called up to the Turkey U17s for the 2022 UEFA European Under-17 Championship. He was called up to the Turkey U19 for the 2024 UEFA European Under-19 Championship.
