= Rory Wilson =

Scottish footballer (born 2006)

Personal information
- Date of birth: 5 January 2006 (age 20)
- Place of birth: Girvan, South Ayrshire, Scotland
- Height: 6 ft 0 in (1.83 m)
- Position: Forward

Team information
- Current team: Aston Villa
- Number: 57

Youth career
- 2014–2022: Rangers
- 2022–2026: Aston Villa

Senior career*
Years	Team	Apps	(Gls)
2026–	Aston Villa	0	(0)
2026	→ Sturm Graz (loan)	4	(0)
2026	→ Sturm Graz II (loan)	1	(0)

International career^{‡}
2021–2023	Scotland U17	13	(14)
2023–	Scotland U19	10	(3)
2022–	Scotland U21	2	(0)
- * Club domestic league appearances and goals as of 19:36, 26 April 2026 (UTC) ‡ National team caps and goals as of 10:44, 16 July 2024 (UTC)

Rory Wilson (born 5 January 2006) is a Scottish professional footballer who plays as a forward for Premier League club Aston Villa. Wilson has featured for Villa's U18 and U21 sides since joining the Birmingham club from the Rangers Academy in the summer of 2022.

== Club career ==
=== Early life and Rangers ===
Born in Girvan, Wilson joined the academy of Scottish side Rangers at the age of eight. He progressed well through the academy, scoring 49 goals in the 2021–22 season and being called up to the 'B' team at the age of fifteen. He made one substitute appearance for the B team in the 2021–22 season, in a 2–0 Lowland Football League loss to East Stirlingshire.

=== Aston Villa ===
In June 2022, it was reported that English side Aston Villa were interested in signing Wilson. As he was contracted to Rangers until December 2022, the Ibrox club demanded a fee for the transfer. However, Aston Villa claimed that, as Wilson had not signed a professional deal with Rangers, and was only contracted on amateur terms, he was free to sign with them for a low training compensation fee.

Wilson had signed an amateur contract with Rangers in December 2019; a rolling, three-year deal that would have fallen under the jurisdiction of the Scottish FA had he decided to move to a fellow Scottish club. However, as a move to Aston Villa was classified as an international transfer, international governing body FIFA's rules supersede those of national football associations. As the two clubs valuations for Wilson differed, the transfer fee would have been decided by FIFA.

After negotiations between the two clubs resumed, a reported deal worth a minimum of £350,000 was agreed, and Wilson joined Aston Villa in July 2022.

On 6 January 2023, Wilson's 17th birthday, he signed his first professional contract with Aston Villa. After joining Villa, Wilson's goal scoring form continued. For the Villa Academy, Wilson netted hat-tricks against Liverpool and Brentford in the U17 Premier League Cup and FA Youth Cup respectively. On 7 April 2025, Wilson signed a contract extension with Aston Villa.

==== Sturm Graz loan ====
On 6 February 2026, Wilson signed for Austrian Bundesliga club Sturm Graz on loan until the end of the season. Wilson made his debut for Sturm Graz II in the 2. Liga in March 2026.

== International career ==
Wilson has represented Scotland at youth international level. In September 2022, Wilson stated he was "shocked" after being called up to the Scotland under-21 side.

Wilson debuted against Wales for the Under-17 side in 2021 and has since represented Scotland Under-17's in numerous friendly matches, European Championship qualifiers and European Championship finals matches. He has scored more goals than has made appearances for the Under-17s and has since made 2 appearances for the Under-21's.

== Career statistics ==
=== Club ===
As of match played 18 August 2026

Appearances and goals by club, season and competition
Club	Season	League			National Cup		League Cup		Continental		Other		Total	
Club	Season	Division	Apps	Goals	Apps	Goals	Apps	Goals	Apps	Goals	Apps	Goals	Apps	Goals
Rangers B	2021–22	Lowland Football League	1	0	—		—		—		0	0	1	0
Aston Villa U21	2022–23	—			—		—		—		2 (Note: Appearances in the EFL Trophy)	0	2	0
Aston Villa U21	2023–24	—			—		—		—		1	0	1	0
Aston Villa U21	2024–25	—			—		—		—		0	0	0	0
Aston Villa U21	2025–26	—			—		—		—		2	0	2	0
Aston Villa U21	2026–27	—			—		—		—		1	0	1	0
Aston Villa U21	Total		0	0	0	0	0	0	0	0	6	0	6	0
Sturm Graz (loan)	2025–26	Austrian Bundesliga	4	0	0	0	—		—		0	0	4	0
Sturm Graz II (loan)	2025–26	2. Liga	1	0	—		—		—		—		1	0
Career total			6	0	0	0	0	0	0	0	6	0	12	0

== Honours ==
Aston Villa U21s

- Birmingham Senior Cup: 2023-24
