= Elias Hansborg-Sørensen =

Danish footballer (born 2005)

Personal information
- Full name: Elias Hansborg-Sørensen
- Date of birth: 2 July 2005 (age 21)
- Place of birth: Munkebo, Denmark
- Position: Forward

Team information
- Current team: Fredericia
- Number: 29

Youth career
- Munkebo Boldklub
- OB

Senior career*
| Years | Team | Apps | (Gls) |
| 2024–2025 | OB | 21 | (1) |
| 2026– | Fredericia | 6 | (0) |

International career
| 2020–2021 | Denmark U16 | 4 | (2) |
| 2021–2022 | Denmark U17 | 15 | (6) |
| 2022 | Denmark U18 | 5 | (1) |
| 2024 | Denmark U19 | 2 | (0) |
- * Club domestic league appearances and goals as of 19 May 2026

Elias Hansborg-Sørensen (born 2 July 2005) is a Danish footballer who plays as a forward for Danish Superliga club FC Fredericia.

== Club career ==
Raised in Munkebo, a town in Funen, Hansborg-Sørensen started his career at local club Munkebo Boldklub. As a U13 player, he then moved to OB, where he worked his way through the club's youth academy. Among other things, he signed a new three-year contract in August 2022.

In June 2024, ahead of the 2024–25 season, 19-year old Hansborg-Sørensen was permanently promoted to the first team squad.

On 26 July 2024, Hansborg-Sørensen made his official debut for the club, as he was substituted on in the closing minutes of a Danish 1st Division match against HB Køge. In total, Hansborg-Sørensen made 15 appearances for the first team during that season.

Following OB's promotion to the 2025–26 Danish Superliga, playing time became limited for Hansborg-Sørensen. With only 35 minutes of playing time in the first half of the league season, it was confirmed in December 2025 that Hansborg-Sørensen would leave the club at the end of the year, upon the expiration of his contract.

=== FC Fredericia ===
On 2 February 2026, Danish Superliga club FC Fredericia signed Hansborg-Sørensen on a contract until June 2029.

== Honours ==
OB

- Danish 1st Division: 2024–25
