= Aaron Ciammaglichella =

Italian footballer (born 2005)

Personal information
- Date of birth: 26 January 2005 (age 21)
- Place of birth: Turin, Italy
- Height: 1.80 m (5 ft 11 in)
- Positions: Midfielder; winger

Team information
- Current team: Pro Vercelli (on loan from Torino)
- Number: 17

Youth career
- 2015–2025: Torino

Senior career*
Years	Team	Apps	(Gls)
2024–	Torino	1	(0)
2025	→ Ternana (loan)	5	(1)
2025–2026	→ Juve Stabia (loan)	2	(0)
2026–	→ Pro Vercelli (loan)	7	(0)

International career^{‡}
2019	Italy U15	2	(1)
2021–2022	Italy U17	9	(2)
2022–2023	Italy U18	5	(1)
2023–2024	Italy U19	14	(0)
2024–	Italy U20	6	(2)
2026–	Italy U21	1	(0)
- * Club domestic league appearances and goals as of 2 November 2026 ‡ National team caps and goals as of 8 June 2026

Aaron Ciammaglichella (born 26 January 2005) is an Italian professional footballer who plays as a midfielder and winger for Serie C Group A club Pro Vercelli, on loan from Torino.

== Club career ==
=== Torino ===
Ciammaglichella moved to the youth academy of Torino in 2015, and worked his way up their youth categories. In September 2022, he was named by English newspaper The Guardian as one of the best players born in 2005 worldwide.

On 25 August 2024, Ciammaglichella made his senior debut for Torino in a 2–1 win against Atalanta as a substitute for Samuele Ricci in stoppage time.

==== Loan to Ternana ====
On 3 February 2025, Ciammaglichella was loaned by Ternana in Serie C.

==== Loan to Juve Stabia ====
On 1 September 2025, he moved on loan to Juve Stabia in Serie B.

== International career ==
Ciammaglichella was born in Turin, Italy, to an Ethiopian father and an Italian mother. His father arrived in Italy when he was 8 years old and was adopted by a couple from Milan. Being eligible to represent his birth nation and Ethiopia internationally, he is a youth international for Italy, having played for the Italy U15s, U17s, U18s, U19s, U20s and U21s.

== Style of play ==
Ciammaglichella is a central midfielder who can either play in a 2-man or 3-man defense. He can operate as a box-to-box midfielder, a creative midfielder, or as a false-9. He is technically strong, has good vision, and is a powerful presser.
