= Noah Mawete =

Belgian footballer (born 2005)

Personal information
- Full name: Noah Emmanuel Mawete Kinsiona
- Date of birth: 17 October 2005 (age 21)
- Place of birth: Belgium
- Height: 1.74 m (5 ft 9 in)
- Position: Midfielder

Team information
- Current team: Beveren
- Number: 26

Senior career*
Years	Team	Apps	(Gls)
2022–2025	SL16 FC	56	(0)
2022–2025	Standard Liège	2	(0)
2024–2025	→ Lierse (loan)	18	(0)
2025–	Beveren	8	(0)

International career^{‡}
2020	Belgium U15	1	(0)
2021–2022	Belgium U17	12	(3)
2023	Belgium U18	3	(0)
2023	Belgium U19	4	(0)
2024	DR Congo U20	1	(0)
- * Club domestic league appearances and goals as of 19 April 2026 ‡ National team caps and goals as of 25 May 2024

Noah Emmanuel Mawete Kinsiona (born 17 October 2005) is a footballer who plays as a midfielder for Beveren. Born in Belgium, he represents DR Congo internationally.

== Club career ==
On 2 July 2025, Mawete signed a three-year contract with Beveren.

== International career ==
Born in Belgium, Mawete is of DR Congolese descent. He is a former youth international for Belgium, having played up to the Belgium U19s. He switched to representing DR Congo from the under-20 level.

== Career statistics ==
=== Club ===
As of 16 May 2022.

Club	Season	League			Cup		Other		Total	
Club	Season	Division	Apps	Goals	Apps	Goals	Apps	Goals	Apps	Goals
Standard Liège	2021–22	Jupiler Pro League	1	0	0	0	0	0	1	0
Career total			1	0	0	0	0	0	1	0
