= 2022 UEFA European Under-17 Championship squads =

Football tournament squads

This article describes about the squads for the 2022 UEFA European Under-17 Championship.

Players in boldface have been capped at full international level at some point in their career.

== Group A ==
=== Germany ===
Head coach: Marc Meister

No.	Pos.	Player	Date of birth (age)	Club
1	GK	Dennis Seimen	30 November 2005 (aged 16)	(German Football Association) VfB Stuttgart
12	GK	Tim Goller	26 January 2005 (aged 17)	(German Football Association) Hertha BSC
2	DF	Simon Walde	4 January 2005 (aged 17)	(German Football Association) Borussia Mönchengladbach
3	DF	Alexandre Nogueira Azevedo	25 March 2005 (aged 17)	(German Football Association) VfB Stuttgart
4	DF	Tarek Buchmann	28 February 2005 (aged 17)	(German Football Association) Bayern München
5	DF	Armend Likaj	12 March 2005 (aged 17)	(German Football Association) FC Schalke 04
13	DF	Paulo Fritschi	20 May 2005 (aged 16)	(German Football Association) VfB Stuttgart
14	DF	Vincent Manuba	1 July 2005 (aged 16)	(German Football Association) Bayern München
19	DF	Tim Hoffmann	26 February 2005 (aged 17)	(German Football Association) Hertha BSC
6	MF	Philipp Schulz	25 May 2005 (aged 16)	(German Football Association) 1. FSV Mainz 05
7	MF	**Paul Wanner**	23 December 2005 (aged 16)	(German Football Association) Bayern München
8	MF	Samuele Di Benedetto	16 July 2005 (aged 16)	(German Football Association) VfB Stuttgart
10	MF	Tom Bischof	28 June 2005 (aged 16)	(German Football Association) TSG Hoffenheim
11	MF	Laurin Ulrich	31 January 2005 (aged 17)	(German Football Association) VfB Stuttgart
15	MF	Rafael Lubach	11 January 2005 (aged 17)	(German Football Association) Borussia Dortmund
16	MF	Arijon Ibrahimović	11 December 2005 (aged 16)	(German Football Association) Bayern München
17	MF	Maurice Krattenmacher	11 August 2005 (aged 16)	(German Football Association) SpVgg Unterhaching
20	MF	Sidney Raebiger	17 April 2005 (aged 17)	(German Football Association) RB Leipzig
9	FW	Nelson Weiper	17 March 2005 (aged 17)	(German Football Association) 1. FSV Mainz 05
18	FW	Dženan Pejčinović	15 February 2005 (aged 17)	(German Football Association) FC Augsburg

=== Israel ===
Head coach: Gadi Brumer

No.	Pos.	Player	Date of birth (age)	Club
1	GK	Ofek Melika	23 January 2005 (aged 17)	(Israel Football Association) Hapoel Ra'anana
18	GK	Amit Mashiah	1 February 2005 (aged 17)	(Israel Football Association) Hapoel Tel Aviv
2	DF	Guy Deznet	1 November 2005 (aged 16)	(Israel Football Association) Maccabi Petah Tikva
3	DF	Fares Agbaria	8 February 2005 (aged 17)	(Israel Football Association) Maccabi Netanya
4	DF	Maor Yashilirmak	16 January 2005 (aged 17)	(Israel Football Association) SC Ashdod
5	DF	Shavit Elgabi	15 June 2005 (aged 16)	(Israel Football Association) Maccabi Petah Tikva
12	DF	Noam Ben Harush	13 May 2005 (aged 17)	(Israel Football Association) Beitar Nes Tubruk
13	DF	Roi Levi	27 January 2005 (aged 17)	(Israel Football Association) Hapoel Tel Aviv
15	DF	Avi Turgeman	1 May 2005 (aged 17)	(Israel Football Association) Hapoel Tel Aviv
6	MF	Loay Shaban	5 January 2005 (aged 17)	(Israel Football Association) Maccabi Haifa
7	MF	Itamar Mashraki	16 August 2005 (aged 16)	(Israel Football Association) Maccabi Petah Tikva
8	MF	Yarin Levi	1 August 2005 (aged 16)	(Israel Football Association) Maccabi Haifa
10	MF	Roi Itzhak	7 January 2005 (aged 17)	(Israel Football Association) Maccabi Petah Tikva
11	MF	Yan Yusupov	17 August 2005 (aged 16)	(Israel Football Association) Beitar Jerusalem
14	MF	Yanai Distalfeld	29 June 2005 (aged 16)	(Israel Football Association) Maccabi Haifa
16	MF	Niv Yehoshua	1 January 2005 (aged 17)	(Israel Football Association) Maccabi Petah Tikva
20	MF	Yuval Kretzo	18 July 2005 (aged 16)	(Israel Football Association) Hapoel Ra'anana
9	FW	Karem Zoabi	3 May 2006 (aged 16)	(Israel Football Association) Hapoel Jerusalem
17	FW	Yahli Shavu	1 June 2005 (aged 16)	(Israel Football Association) Maccabi Petah Tikva
19	FW	Liron Sheichy	2 December 2005 (aged 16)	(Israel Football Association) Bnei Yehuda Tel Aviv

=== Italy ===
Head coach: Bernardo Corradi

No.	Pos.	Player	Date of birth (age)	Club
1	GK	Federico Magro	10 January 2005 (aged 17)	(Italian Football Federation) Lazio
12	GK	Francesco Borriello	25 July 2005 (aged 16)	(Italian Football Federation) Parma
2	DF	Nicolò Serra	20 January 2005 (aged 17)	(Italian Football Federation) Torino
3	DF	Filippo Saiani	16 February 2005 (aged 17)	(Italian Football Federation) SPAL
5	DF	**Filippo Mane**	8 March 2005 (aged 17)	(German Football Association) Borussia Dortmund
6	DF	**Fabio Chiarodia**	5 June 2005 (aged 16)	(German Football Association) Werder Bremen
13	DF	Giovanni D'Aprile	1 July 2005 (aged 16)	(Italian Football Federation) Torino
16	DF	Mattia Malaspina	24 July 2005 (aged 16)	(Italian Football Federation) Milan
17	DF	Saverio Domanico	26 January 2005 (aged 17)	(Italian Football Federation) Juventus
4	MF	**Luca Lipani**	18 May 2005 (aged 16)	(Italian Football Federation) Genoa
7	MF	Luca Di Maggio	31 March 2005 (aged 17)	(Italian Football Federation) Internazionale
8	MF	Aaron Ciammaglichella	26 January 2005 (aged 17)	(Italian Football Federation) Torino
10	MF	Daniele Quieto	22 October 2005 (aged 16)	(Italian Football Federation) Internazionale
14	MF	Fabio Parravicini	20 January 2005 (aged 17)	(Italian Football Federation) SPAL
15	MF	Vincenzo Onofrietti	4 May 2005 (aged 17)	(German Football Association) Borussia Dortmund
20	MF	Kevin Bruno	26 April 2005 (aged 17)	(Italian Football Federation) Sassuolo
9	FW	Alessandro Bolzan	24 February 2005 (aged 17)	(Italian Football Federation) Roma
11	FW	Marco Delle Monache	3 February 2005 (aged 17)	(Italian Football Federation) Pescara
18	FW	Alessio Vacca	15 June 2005 (aged 16)	(Italian Football Federation) Juventus
19	FW	**Pio Esposito**	28 June 2005 (aged 16)	(Italian Football Federation) Internazionale

=== Luxembourg ===
Head coach: Mario Mutsch

No.	Pos.	Player	Date of birth (age)	Club
1	GK	Tiago Cardoso Pereira	7 April 2006 (aged 16)	(Luxembourg Football Federation) CS Fola Esch
12	GK	Joao Alves Margato	17 December 2005 (aged 16)	(Luxembourg Football Federation) F91 Dudelange
2	DF	Clayton Irigoyen	18 February 2005 (aged 17)	(German Football Association) FC Nürnberg
3	DF	Fabio Lohei	12 April 2005 (aged 17)	(French Football Federation) FC Metz
4	DF	Massimo Agostinelli	12 April 2005 (aged 17)	(German Football Association) FC Nürnberg
5	DF	Sofiane Ikene	27 February 2005 (aged 17)	(Luxembourg Football Federation) F91 Dudelange
13	DF	Jordan Barbalinardo	11 April 2006 (aged 16)	(Luxembourg Football Federation) F91 Dudelange
14	DF	Adel Civovic	27 May 2005 (aged 16)	(Luxembourg Football Federation) FC Rodange 91
15	DF	Gianluca Totaro	10 March 2005 (aged 17)	(Luxembourg Football Federation) F91 Dudelange
6	MF	Hugo Luis Afonso	28 April 2005 (aged 17)	(German Football Association) Karlsruher SC
7	MF	Enzo Fonseca Lima	3 March 2005 (aged 17)	(Luxembourg Football Federation) F91 Dudelange
11	MF	Thomas Souchard	25 May 2005 (aged 16)	(German Football Association) Karlsruher SC
16	MF	Dino Sabotic	19 April 2006 (aged 16)	(Luxembourg Football Federation) CS Fola Esch
17	MF	Mattia Bartoletti	9 August 2005 (aged 16)	(Luxembourg Football Federation) CS Fola Esch
20	MF	Ruben Ferreira Moreira	31 March 2005 (aged 17)	(French Football Federation) FC Metz
21	MF	Robin Moutschen	31 August 2005 (aged 16)	(French Football Federation) FC Arlon
9	FW	Jayson Videira	17 February 2005 (aged 17)	(German Football Association) Hannover 96
10	FW	Tim Flick	23 November 2005 (aged 16)	(German Football Association) Eintracht Frankfurt
18	FW	Ronaldo Machado	28 January 2005 (aged 17)	(Luxembourg Football Federation) Titus Pétange
19	FW	Liam Nürenberg	5 March 2006 (aged 16)	(Luxembourg Football Federation) RFCU Luxembourg

== Group B ==
=== Bulgaria ===
Head coach: Yordan Petkov

No.	Pos.	Player	Date of birth (age)	Club
1	GK	Aleks Bozhev	19 July 2005 (aged 16)	(Bulgarian Football Union) CSKA Sofia
12	GK	Velizar Iliev	20 July 2005 (aged 16)	(Italian Football Federation) Cagliari
2	DF	Slavi Chakarov	8 May 2005 (aged 17)	(Bulgarian Football Union) Levski
3	DF	Mihail Tsonev	6 November 2005 (aged 16)	(Bulgarian Football Union) CSKA 1948
4	DF	Simeon Vasilev	24 October 2005 (aged 16)	(Bulgarian Football Union) CSKA 1948
5	DF	Rosen Marinov	2 February 2005 (aged 17)	(Bulgarian Football Union) CSKA Sofia
6	DF	Martin Georgiev	24 September 2005 (aged 16)	(Bulgarian Football Union) Slavia
7	DF	Zahari Atanasov	31 January 2005 (aged 17)	(Bulgarian Football Union) Septemvri
15	DF	Rosen Bozhinov	23 January 2005 (aged 17)	(Bulgarian Football Union) CSKA Sofia
8	MF	Antoan Stoyanov	17 January 2005 (aged 17)	(Bulgarian Football Union) Levski
10	MF	Asen Mitkov	17 February 2005 (aged 17)	(Bulgarian Football Union) Levski
17	MF	Stefan Traykov	18 December 2005 (aged 16)	(Bulgarian Football Union) Slavia
18	MF	Chung Nguyen Do	23 May 2005 (aged 16)	(Bulgarian Football Union) Slavia
20	MF	Nedzhib Hadzha	15 August 2005 (aged 16)	(German Football Association) Schalke 04
9	FW	Roberto Raychev	7 December 2005 (aged 16)	(Bulgarian Football Union) Slavia
11	FW	Borislav Marinov	2 March 2005 (aged 17)	(Bulgarian Football Union) Septemvri
14	FW	Konstantin Pavlov	14 August 2005 (aged 16)	(Bulgarian Football Union) Botev Plovdiv
19	FW	Petar Kirev	22 July 2005 (aged 16)	(Bulgarian Football Union) Ludogorets
21	FW	Aleksandar Petrov	19 April 2005 (aged 17)	(Bulgarian Football Union) Septemvri
22	FW	Aleksandar Aleksandrov	18 October 2005 (aged 16)	(Bulgarian Football Union) Spartak Varna

=== France ===
Head coach: José Alcocer

No.	Pos.	Player	Date of birth (age)	Club
1	GK	Lisandru Olmeta	20 July 2005 (aged 16)	(French Football Federation) AS Monaco
16	GK	Noah Raveyre	22 June 2005 (aged 16)	(French Football Federation) AS Saint-Étienne
2	DF	**Saël Kumbedi**	26 March 2005 (aged 17)	(French Football Federation) Le Havre
3	DF	Luzolo Vangi Vungele	8 August 2005 (aged 16)	(French Football Federation) FC Metz
4	DF	**Mamadou Sarr**	29 August 2005 (aged 16)	(French Football Federation) Olympique Lyonnais
5	DF	El Chadaille Bitshiabu	16 May 2005 (aged 17)	(French Football Federation) Paris Saint Germain
13	DF	Christian Mawissa Elebi	18 April 2005 (aged 17)	(French Football Federation) Toulouse FC
15	DF	Elyaz Zidane	26 December 2005 (aged 16)	(Royal Spanish Football Federation) Real Madrid
17	DF	Jeanuël Belocian	17 February 2005 (aged 17)	(French Football Federation) Stade Rennais
6	MF	**Warren Zaïre-Emery**	8 March 2006 (aged 16)	(French Football Federation) Paris Saint Germain
8	MF	Valentin Atangana Edoa	25 August 2005 (aged 16)	(French Football Federation) Stade de Reims
10	MF	**Désiré Doué**	3 June 2005 (aged 16)	(French Football Federation) Stade Rennais
14	MF	Naim Byar	23 February 2005 (aged 17)	(French Football Federation) Stade de Reims
20	MF	Alexis Kabamba	15 October 2005 (aged 16)	(French Football Federation) Stade de Reims
7	FW	Axel Gueguin	24 March 2005 (aged 17)	(French Football Federation) Montpellier HSC
9	FW	Mathys Tel	27 April 2005 (aged 17)	(French Football Federation) Stade Rennais
11	FW	Tom Saettel	19 June 2005 (aged 16)	(French Football Federation) RC Strasbourg
12	FW	Zoumana Diallo	2 February 2005 (aged 17)	(French Football Federation) RC Strasbourg
18	FW	Ayman Aiki	25 June 2005 (aged 16)	(French Football Federation) AS Saint-Étienne
19	FW	Junior Ndiaye	29 March 2005 (aged 17)	(French Football Federation) Montpellier HSC

=== Netherlands ===
Head coach: Mischa Visser

No.	Pos.	Player	Date of birth (age)	Club
1	GK	Tristan Kuijsten	16 January 2005 (aged 17)	(Royal Dutch Football Association) AZ
16	GK	Bernt Klaverboer	26 September 2005 (aged 16)	(Royal Dutch Football Association) SC Heerenveen
2	DF	Bram Rovers	14 January 2005 (aged 17)	(Royal Dutch Football Association) PSV
3	DF	Thijmen Blokzijl	25 February 2005 (aged 17)	(Royal Dutch Football Association) FC Groningen
4	DF	**Dean Huijsen**	14 April 2005 (aged 17)	(Italian Football Federation) Juventus
5	DF	Rainey Breinburg	5 August 2005 (aged 16)	(Royal Dutch Football Association) Feyenoord
12	DF	Alvaro Henry	14 February 2005 (aged 17)	(Royal Dutch Football Association) Ajax
13	DF	Oualid Agougil	7 August 2005 (aged 16)	(Royal Dutch Football Association) Ajax
6	MF	Tim van den Heuvel	11 February 2005 (aged 17)	(Royal Dutch Football Association) PSV
8	MF	Mike Kleijn	9 February 2005 (aged 17)	(Royal Dutch Football Association) Feyenoord
10	MF	Gabriel Misehouy	18 July 2005 (aged 16)	(Royal Dutch Football Association) Ajax
11	MF	Isaac Babadi	6 April 2005 (aged 17)	(Royal Dutch Football Association) PSV
14	MF	Silvano Vos	16 March 2005 (aged 17)	(Royal Dutch Football Association) Ajax
15	MF	Ilias Splinter	26 May 2005 (aged 16)	(Royal Dutch Football Association) AZ
18	MF	Antoni Milambo	3 April 2005 (aged 17)	(Royal Dutch Football Association) Feyenoord
20	MF	Ezechiel Banzuzi	16 February 2005 (aged 17)	(Royal Dutch Football Association) NAC Breda
7	FW	Jaden Slory	9 May 2005 (aged 17)	(Royal Dutch Football Association) Feyenoord
9	FW	Jason van Duiven	24 February 2005 (aged 17)	(Royal Dutch Football Association) PSV
17	FW	Yoram Boerhout	5 April 2005 (aged 17)	(Royal Dutch Football Association) Ajax
19	FW	Fabiano Rust	6 January 2005 (aged 17)	(Royal Dutch Football Association) Feyenoord

=== Poland ===
Head coach: Dariusz Gęsior

No.	Pos.	Player	Date of birth (age)	Club
1	GK	Jakub Murawski	3 April 2005 (aged 17)	(Polish Football Association) Legia Warszawa
12	GK	Antoni Mikułko	11 February 2005 (aged 17)	(Polish Football Association) Lechia Gdańsk
3	DF	Jakub Lewicki	17 September 2005 (aged 16)	(Polish Football Association) Jagiellonia Białystok
4	DF	Bartosz Tomaszewski	27 January 2005 (aged 17)	(Polish Football Association) Lech Poznań
5	DF	Konrad Magnuszewski	19 January 2005 (aged 17)	(Polish Football Association) Pogoń Szczecin
14	DF	Tommaso Guercio	1 June 2005 (aged 16)	(Italian Football Federation) Internazionale FC
15	DF	Paweł Rychlik	10 May 2005 (aged 17)	(Polish Football Association) FASE Szczecin
16	DF	Miłosz Kurzydłowski	20 January 2005 (aged 17)	(Polish Football Association) Lechia Gdańsk
2	MF	Jakub Staniszewski	11 July 2005 (aged 16)	(Polish Football Association) Arka Gdynia
6	MF	Dawid Drachal	31 January 2005 (aged 17)	(Polish Football Association) Escola Varsovia
7	MF	Dawid Tkacz	25 January 2005 (aged 17)	(Polish Football Association) Górnik Łęczna
8	MF	Marcel Kalemba	6 June 2005 (aged 16)	(German Football Association) 1. FSV Mainz 05
11	MF	Kacper Masiak	11 January 2005 (aged 17)	(Polish Football Association) Zagłębie Lubin
13	MF	Bartosz Bernatowicz	14 February 2005 (aged 17)	(Polish Football Association) Jagiellonia Białystok
18	MF	Mateusz Wójcik	1 December 2005 (aged 16)	(Polish Football Association) Lech Poznań
20	MF	Kacper Terlecki	31 July 2005 (aged 16)	(Polish Football Association) Zagłębie Lubin
23	MF	Mikołaj Tudruj	23 January 2006 (aged 16)	(Polish Football Association) Lech Poznań
9	FW	Kacper Śmiglewski	7 January 2005 (aged 17)	(Polish Football Association) Polonia Warszawa
10	FW	Oliwier Sławiński	15 April 2005 (aged 17)	(Polish Football Association) Zagłębie Lubin
19	FW	Szymon Doba	10 August 2005 (aged 16)	(Polish Football Association) Olimpia Grudziądz

== Group C ==
=== Belgium ===
Head coach: David Penneman

No.	Pos.	Player	Date of birth (age)	Club
1	GK	**Matthieu Epolo**	15 January 2005 (aged 17)	(Royal Belgian Football Association) Standard Liège
12	GK	Tom Poitoux	4 June 2005 (aged 16)	(Royal Belgian Football Association) Standard Liège
2	DF	Kyriani Sabbe	26 January 2005 (aged 17)	(Royal Belgian Football Association) Club Brugge
3	DF	Arthur Piedfort	1 February 2005 (aged 17)	(Royal Dutch Football Association) PSV Eindhoven
4	DF	Ibrahim Digberekou	22 February 2005 (aged 17)	(German Football Association) Borussia Mönchengladbach
5	DF	Roméo Monticelli	2 October 2005 (aged 16)	(Royal Belgian Football Association) Royal Charleroi
13	DF	Mathis Sturbaut	8 March 2005 (aged 17)	(Royal Belgian Football Association) Club Brugge
14	DF	Jorne Spileers	21 January 2005 (aged 17)	(Royal Belgian Football Association) Club Brugge
15	DF	Vincent Burlet	23 September 2005 (aged 16)	(German Football Association) Schalke 04
6	MF	**Arthur Vermeeren**	7 February 2005 (aged 17)	(Royal Belgian Football Association) Royal Antwerp
8	MF	Noah Mawete Kinsiona	17 October 2005 (aged 16)	(Royal Belgian Football Association) Standard Liège
10	MF	Stanis Idumbo	29 June 2005 (aged 16)	(Royal Dutch Football Association) Ajax
16	MF	Faissal Al Mazyani	18 January 2005 (aged 17)	(Royal Belgian Football Association) Genk
18	MF	Enzo Geerts	3 January 2005 (aged 17)	(Royal Dutch Football Association) PSV Eindhoven
20	MF	**Chemsdine Talbi**	9 May 2005 (aged 17)	(Royal Belgian Football Association) Club Brugge
7	FW	Cihan Çanak	24 January 2005 (aged 17)	(Royal Belgian Football Association) Standard Liège
9	FW	**Malick Fofana**	31 March 2005 (aged 17)	(Royal Belgian Football Association) Gent
11	FW	**Mika Godts**	7 June 2005 (aged 16)	(Royal Belgian Football Association) Genk
17	FW	Enock Agyei	13 January 2005 (aged 17)	(Royal Belgian Football Association) Anderlecht
19	FW	Frederic Soelle Soelle	24 December 2005 (aged 16)	(Royal Belgian Football Association) Mechelen

=== Serbia ===
Head coach: Radovan Krivokapić

No.	Pos.	Player	Date of birth (age)	Club
1	GK	Luka Lijeskić	23 February 2005 (aged 17)	(Football Association of Serbia) Brodarac
23	GK	Vuk Mitrović	16 September 2005 (aged 16)	(Football Association of Serbia) Zemun
2	DF	Đuro-Giulio Đekić	30 June 2005 (aged 16)	(Croatian Football Federation) Lokomotiva
3	DF	Veljko Mirosavić	7 June 2005 (aged 16)	(Football Association of Serbia) Čukarički
4	DF	Aleksej Vukičević	11 June 2005 (aged 16)	(Football Association of Serbia) Crvena zvezda
5	DF	Milan Majstorović	21 January 2005 (aged 17)	(Football Association of Serbia) Vojvodina
6	DF	Vojin Serafimović	14 October 2005 (aged 16)	(Football Association of Serbia) Čukarički
13	DF	Stefan Bukinac	8 July 2005 (aged 16)	(Football Association of Serbia) Vojvodina
17	DF	**Jan-Carlo Simić**	2 May 2005 (aged 17)	(German Football Association) VfB Stuttgart
18	DF	**Kosta Nedeljković**	16 December 2005 (aged 16)	(Football Association of Serbia) Crvena zvezda
7	MF	Jovan Šljivić	14 October 2005 (aged 16)	(Football Association of Serbia) Crvena zvezda
8	MF	Aleksandar Stanković	3 August 2005 (aged 16)	(Italian Football Federation) Internazionale
10	MF	Mateja Radonjić	20 September 2005 (aged 16)	(Football Association of Serbia) Crvena zvezda
14	MF	Matija Stojanović	6 May 2005 (aged 17)	(Football Association of Serbia) Čukarički
15	MF	Stefan Džodić	15 March 2005 (aged 17)	(French Football Federation) Montpellier HSC
16	MF	Miodrag Pivaš	17 May 2005 (aged 16)	(Austrian Football Association) SV Grödig
20	MF	Milan Kovačev	10 August 2005 (aged 16)	(Football Association of Serbia) Vojvodina
9	FW	Mateja Bubanj	3 January 2005 (aged 17)	(Football Association of Serbia) Crvena zvezda
11	FW	Jovan Mijatović	11 July 2005 (aged 16)	(Football Association of Serbia) Crvena zvezda
19	FW	Jovan Milošević	31 July 2005 (aged 16)	(Football Association of Serbia) Vojvodina

=== Spain ===
Head coach: Julen Guerrero

No.	Pos.	Player	Date of birth (age)	Club
1	GK	Ferrán Quetglas	5 June 2005 (aged 16)	(Royal Spanish Football Federation) RCD Mallorca
13	GK	Nono	26 January 2005 (aged 17)	(Royal Spanish Football Federation) FC Barcelona
2	DF	Carlos Sogorb	23 February 2005 (aged 17)	(Royal Spanish Football Federation) RCD Mallorca
3	DF	Youssef Enríquez	7 October 2005 (aged 16)	(Royal Spanish Football Federation) Real Madrid CF
4	DF	Javier Boñar	3 June 2005 (aged 16)	(Royal Spanish Football Federation) Atlético Madrid
5	DF	Yarek Gasiorowski	12 January 2005 (aged 17)	(Royal Spanish Football Federation) Valencia CF
14	DF	Wassim Keddari	3 February 2005 (aged 17)	(Royal Spanish Football Federation) RCD Espanyol
15	DF	Daniel Rodríguez Crespo	9 August 2005 (aged 16)	(Royal Spanish Football Federation) FC Barcelona
17	DF	Iván Garriel	3 April 2005 (aged 17)	(Royal Spanish Football Federation) Real Valladolid
6	MF	Gerard Hernández	31 March 2005 (aged 17)	(Royal Spanish Football Federation) FC Barcelona
7	MF	Pol Fortuny	11 March 2005 (aged 17)	(Royal Spanish Football Federation) Real Madrid CF
8	MF	Daniel Pérez	26 July 2005 (aged 16)	(Royal Spanish Football Federation) Real Betis
12	MF	Mahamadou Susoho Sissoho	20 January 2005 (aged 17)	(The Football Association) Manchester City
16	MF	Antonio David Moreno	11 October 2005 (aged 16)	(Royal Spanish Football Federation) Real Madrid CF
18	MF	Rodrigo Mendoza	15 March 2005 (aged 17)	(Royal Spanish Football Federation) Elche CF
20	MF	Miguel Carvalho	9 March 2005 (aged 17)	(Royal Spanish Football Federation) RCD Espanyol
9	FW	Álvaro Ginés	15 March 2005 (aged 17)	(Royal Spanish Football Federation) Real Madrid CF
10	FW	Iker Bravo	13 January 2005 (aged 17)	(German Football Association) Bayer 04 Leverkusen
11	FW	David Mella	23 May 2005 (aged 16)	(Royal Spanish Football Federation) Deportivo de La Coruña
19	FW	Víctor Moreno Alcalá	30 September 2005 (aged 16)	(Royal Spanish Football Federation) CD Roda

=== Turkey ===
Head coach: Övünç Başar

No.	Pos.	Player	Date of birth (age)	Club
1	GK	Arif Şimşir	31 May 2005 (aged 16)	(Turkish Football Federation) Altınordu
23	GK	Mert Furkan Bayram	2 January 2005 (aged 17)	(Turkish Football Federation) Altınordu
2	DF	Ali Turap Bülbül	25 January 2005 (aged 17)	(Turkish Football Federation) Galatasaray A.Ş.
3	DF	Berkay Yılmaz	25 February 2005 (aged 17)	(German Football Association) SC Freiburg
4	DF	Ali Yeşilyurt	30 July 2005 (aged 16)	(Turkish Football Federation) Galatasaray A.Ş.
5	DF	Hasan Berat Kayalı	15 April 2005 (aged 17)	(Turkish Football Federation) Altınordu
13	DF	Semih Kara	5 May 2005 (aged 17)	(German Football Association) VfB Stuttgart
14	DF	Efe Arda Koyuncu	8 July 2005 (aged 16)	(Turkish Football Federation) Medipol Başakşehir FK
15	DF	Mertcan Ayhan	8 September 2006 (aged 15)	(German Football Association) FC Schalke 04
20	DF	Batuhan Yavuz	4 May 2006 (aged 16)	(German Football Association) FC Schalke 04
6	MF	Diren Dağdeviren	8 March 2005 (aged 17)	(German Football Association) TSG Hoffenheim
7	MF	Selim Can Sönmez	31 March 2005 (aged 17)	(Royal Dutch Football Association) FC Utrecht
8	MF	Ali Eren Ersungur	22 November 2005 (aged 16)	(German Football Association) TSG Hoffenheim
10	MF	Emirhan Acar	25 July 2005 (aged 16)	(Austrian Football Association) AKA Tirol
18	MF	Efe Akman	20 March 2006 (aged 16)	(Turkish Football Federation) Galatasaray A.Ş.
16	MF	Baran Ali Gezek	26 August 2005 (aged 16)	(Turkish Football Federation) Yukatel Kayserispor
17	MF	Efe-Kaan Sihlaroglu	8 July 2005 (aged 16)	(German Football Association) Karlsruher SC
9	FW	Halil Özdemir	18 August 2005 (aged 16)	(Royal Belgian Football Association) KV Mechelen
11	FW	**Can Uzun**	11 November 2005 (aged 16)	(German Football Association) 1. FC Nürnberg
19	FW	Engin Poyraz Efe Yıldırım	15 January 2005 (aged 17)	(Turkish Football Federation) Trabzonspor A.Ş.

== Group D ==
=== Denmark ===
Head coach: Kenneth Weber

No.	Pos.	Player	Date of birth (age)	Club
1	GK	Theo Sander	8 January 2005 (aged 17)	(Danish Football Association) AaB
16	GK	Aske Leth Andresen	12 July 2005 (aged 16)	(Danish Football Association) Silkeborg IF
2	DF	Malek Bakhit	13 May 2005 (aged 17)	(Danish Football Association) Brøndby IF
3	DF	Matteo Grosso	17 February 2005 (aged 17)	(Danish Football Association) Brøndby IF
4	DF	Ludwig Vraa	23 June 2005 (aged 16)	(Danish Football Association) Brøndby IF
5	DF	Malthe Johnsen Bøndergaard	14 October 2005 (aged 16)	(Danish Football Association) FC Midtjylland
12	DF	Gustav Wagner	10 May 2005 (aged 17)	(Danish Football Association) SønderjyskE
13	DF	Mads Nybo Lauritsen	21 March 2005 (aged 17)	(Danish Football Association) FC Midtjylland
15	DF	Gustav Fraulo	23 April 2005 (aged 17)	(Danish Football Association) FC Midtjylland
6	MF	Julius Beck	27 April 2005 (aged 17)	(Italian Football Federation) Spezia Calcio
8	MF	Zidan Sertdemir	4 February 2005 (aged 17)	(German Football Association) Bayer 04 Leverkusen
10	MF	Valdemar Byskov	5 January 2005 (aged 17)	(Danish Football Association) FC Midtjylland
14	MF	Bertram Kvist	19 March 2005 (aged 17)	(Danish Football Association) Brøndby IF
17	MF	Noah Nartey	5 October 2005 (aged 16)	(Danish Football Association) Brøndby IF
18	MF	Noah Sahsah	8 July 2005 (aged 16)	(Danish Football Association) FC København
19	MF	Magnus Bjørnholm	5 June 2005 (aged 16)	(Danish Football Association) FC Nordsjælland
20	MF	Oscar Højlund	4 January 2005 (aged 17)	(Danish Football Association) FC København
7	FW	Alexander Simmelhack	11 November 2005 (aged 16)	(Danish Football Association) Randers FC
9	FW	Elias Hansborg-Sørensen	2 July 2005 (aged 16)	(Danish Football Association) OB
11	FW	Emil Højlund	4 January 2005 (aged 17)	(Danish Football Association) FC København

=== Portugal ===
Head coach: José Lima

No.	Pos.	Player	Date of birth (age)	Club
1	GK	Francisco Silva	20 November 2005 (aged 16)	(Portuguese Football Federation) Sporting
12	GK	Diogo Fernandes	17 February 2005 (aged 17)	(Portuguese Football Federation) FC Porto
2	DF	João Conceição	23 April 2005 (aged 17)	(Portuguese Football Federation) Benfica
3	DF	João Muniz	26 June 2005 (aged 16)	(Portuguese Football Federation) Sporting
4	DF	Diogo Monteiro	28 January 2005 (aged 17)	(Swiss Football Association) Servette
5	DF	Leonardo Barroso	12 June 2005 (aged 16)	(Portuguese Football Federation) Sporting
13	DF	Martim Fernandes	18 January 2006 (aged 16)	(Portuguese Football Federation) FC Porto
14	DF	Luís Gomes	13 April 2005 (aged 17)	(Portuguese Football Federation) FC Porto
6	MF	Rafael Luís	18 February 2005 (aged 17)	(Portuguese Football Federation) Benfica
8	MF	João Veloso	26 June 2005 (aged 16)	(Portuguese Football Federation) Benfica
10	MF	Ussumane Djaló	6 January 2005 (aged 17)	(Portuguese Football Federation) Benfica
15	MF	Manuel Mendonça	24 March 2005 (aged 17)	(Portuguese Football Federation) Sporting
16	MF	Dário Essugo	14 March 2005 (aged 17)	(Portuguese Football Federation) Sporting
20	MF	João Gonçalves	26 February 2005 (aged 17)	(Portuguese Football Federation) Sporting de Braga
7	FW	Rodrigo Ribeiro	28 April 2005 (aged 17)	(Portuguese Football Federation) Sporting
9	FW	Dinis Rodrigues	14 July 2005 (aged 16)	(Portuguese Football Federation) Sporting de Braga
11	FW	Ivan Lima	13 January 2005 (aged 17)	(Portuguese Football Federation) Benfica
17	FW	Afonso Moreira	19 March 2005 (aged 17)	(Portuguese Football Federation) Sporting
18	FW	Tiago Andrade	21 October 2005 (aged 16)	(Portuguese Football Federation) FC Porto
19	FW	Vivaldo Semedo	28 January 2005 (aged 17)	(Portuguese Football Federation) Sporting

=== Scotland ===
Head coach: Brian McLaughlin

No.	Pos.	Player	Date of birth (age)	Club
1	GK	Jacob Pazikas	13 January 2005 (aged 17)	(Scottish Football Association) Rangers
12	GK	Rory Mahady	16 August 2006 (aged 15)	(Scottish Football Association) Celtic
21	GK	Callan McKenna	22 December 2006 (aged 15)	(Scottish Football Association) Queens Park
2	DF	Jack Kingdom	16 November 2005 (aged 16)	(The Football Association) Manchester United
3	DF	Magnus Mackenzie	3 May 2005 (aged 17)	(Scottish Football Association) Celtic
4	DF	Greig Allan	16 August 2005 (aged 16)	(Scottish Football Association) Rangers
5	DF	Charlie McArthur	12 May 2005 (aged 17)	(Scottish Football Association) Kilmarnock
6	DF	Louis Jackson	18 September 2005 (aged 16)	(The Football Association) Manchester United
13	DF	Cameron Bruce	15 December 2005 (aged 16)	(Scottish Football Association) Queen’s Park
8	MF	Dylan Lobban	26 August 2005 (aged 16)	(Scottish Football Association) Aberdeen
10	MF	Dylan Reid	1 March 2005 (aged 17)	(Scottish Football Association) St. Mirren
11	MF	Cameron Cooper	9 October 2005 (aged 16)	(Scottish Football Association) Partick Thistle
14	MF	Bailey Rice	4 October 2006 (aged 15)	(Scottish Football Association) Motherwell
15	MF	Lennon Miller	25 August 2006 (aged 15)	(Scottish Football Association) Motherwell
16	MF	Josh Dede	4 January 2006 (aged 16)	(Scottish Football Association) Celtic
17	MF	Lewis O'Donnell	21 June 2005 (aged 16)	(Scottish Football Association) Dundee United
18	MF	Craig Moore	21 September 2005 (aged 16)	(Scottish Football Association) Dundee United
7	FW	Rory MacLeod	3 February 2006 (aged 16)	(Scottish Football Association) Dundee United
9	FW	Rory Wilson	5 January 2006 (aged 16)	(Scottish Football Association) Rangers
19	FW	Ethan Laidlaw	2 January 2005 (aged 17)	(Scottish Football Association) Hibernian
20	FW	Bobby Wales	23 June 2005 (aged 16)	(Scottish Football Association) Kilmarnock

=== Sweden ===
Head coach: Roger Franzén

No.	Pos.	Player	Date of birth (age)	Club
1	GK	Elis Bishesari	19 May 2005 (aged 16)	(Swedish Football Association) IF Brommapojkarna
12	GK	Casper Andersson	24 June 2005 (aged 16)	(Swedish Football Association) Kalmar FF
2	DF	Elison Makolli	10 January 2005 (aged 17)	(Swedish Football Association) Malmö FF
3	DF	André Alvarez Perez	23 March 2005 (aged 17)	(Swedish Football Association) Malmö FF
4	DF	Edvin Tellgren	19 January 2005 (aged 17)	(Swedish Football Association) IFK Norrköping
5	DF	Matteo Perez Vinlöf	18 December 2005 (aged 16)	(German Football Association) Bayern München
13	DF	Gottfrid Rapp	18 August 2005 (aged 16)	(Swedish Football Association) IF Elfsborg
14	DF	Fredrik Nissen	28 March 2005 (aged 17)	(Swedish Football Association) IF Brommapojkarna
15	DF	Alexander Hughes	28 February 2005 (aged 17)	(Swedish Football Association) Malmö FF
6	MF	Kazper Karlsson	21 March 2005 (aged 17)	(Swedish Football Association) Halmstads BK
8	MF	Marco Olsson Valdés	2 January 2005 (aged 17)	(Swedish Football Association) IF Brommapojkarna
11	MF	Mallïk Mokédé	9 February 2005 (aged 17)	(Swedish Football Association) Örebro SK
16	MF	Ludwig Malachowski Thorell	25 February 2005 (aged 17)	(Swedish Football Association) IF Brommapojkarna
17	MF	Djoseph Bangala	30 January 2005 (aged 17)	(Italian Football Federation) Parma Calcio 1913
19	MF	Malte Wester	17 September 2005 (aged 16)	(Swedish Football Association) IF Elfsborg
20	MF	Alex Lindelöv	29 January 2005 (aged 17)	(Swedish Football Association) Västerås SK
7	FW	Taha Ayari	10 May 2005 (aged 17)	(Swedish Football Association) AIK Fotboll
9	FW	Emmanuel Tannor	12 January 2005 (aged 17)	(Italian Football Federation) Parma Calcio 1913
10	FW	Jardell Kanga	13 December 2005 (aged 16)	(German Football Association) Bayer 04 Leverkusen
18	FW	Leonardo de Oliveira	8 February 2005 (aged 17)	(Portuguese Football Federation) FC Famalicão
