= Bernt Klaverboer =

Dutch footballer (born 2005)

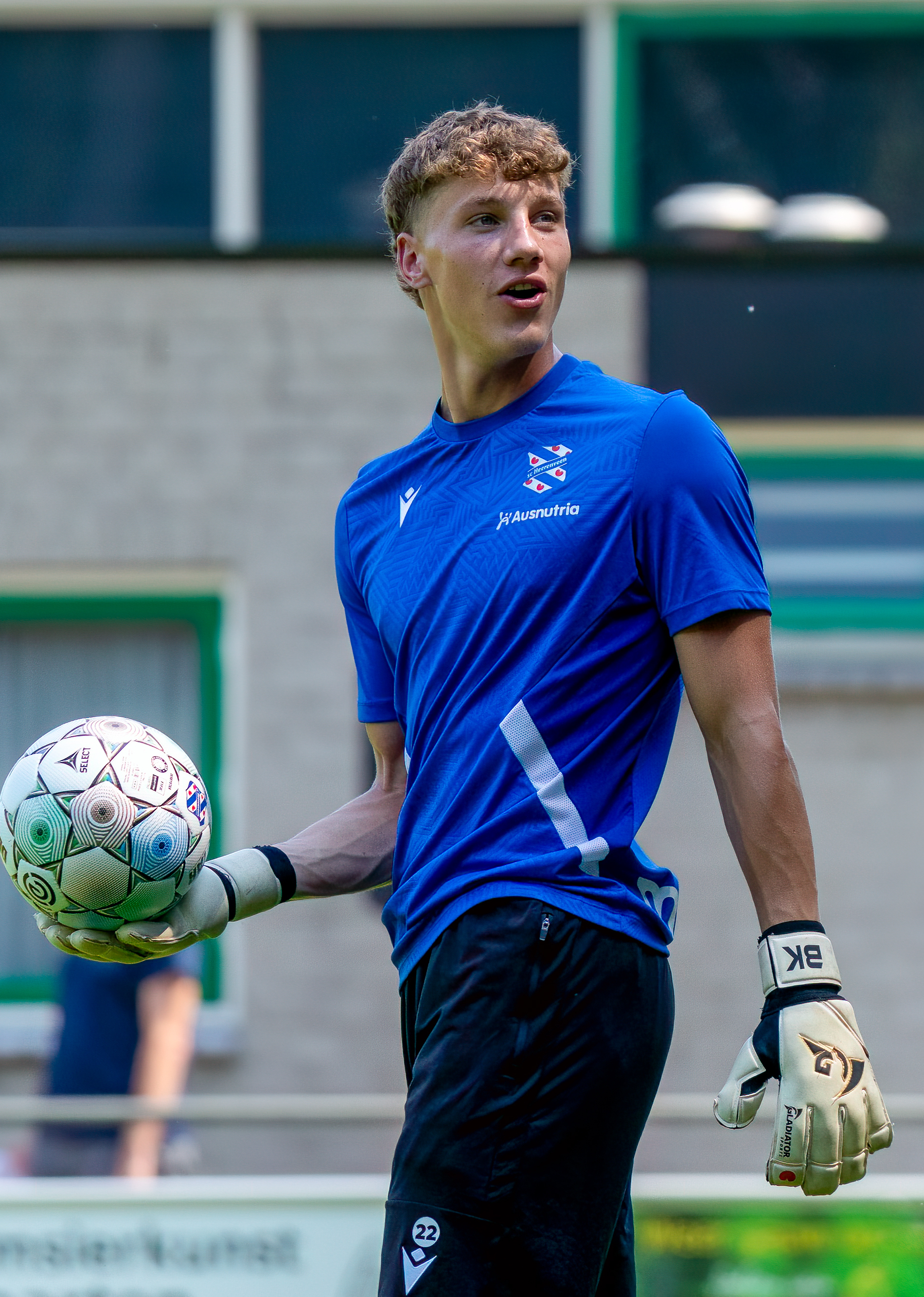
- Klaverboer in 2023

Personal information
- Date of birth: 26 September 2005 (age 21)
- Place of birth: Katlijk, Netherlands
- Height: 1.90 m (6 ft 3 in)
- Position: Goalkeeper

Team information
- Current team: SC Heerenveen
- Number: 22

Youth career
- VV Heerenveen
- 2015–2023: SC Heerenveen

Senior career*
Years	Team	Apps	(Gls)
2023–	SC Heerenveen	30	(0)

International career^{‡}
2023	Netherlands U19	1	(0)
- * Club domestic league appearances and goals as of 19 May 2026 ‡ National team caps and goals as of 22:15, 9 November 2025 (UTC)

Bernt Klaverboer (born 26 September 2005) is a Dutch professional football player who plays as a goalkeeper for the Eredivisie club SC Heerenveen.

== Club career ==
Klaverboer is a product of the youth academies of VV Heerenveen and SC Heerenveen. On 7 November 2022, he signed his first professional contract with SC Heerenveen for 3 years. On 18 December 2024, he made his senior and professional debut with Heerenveen in a 1–0 KNVB Cup win over ASWH where he also got a red card. On 18 June 2025, he extended his contract until 2027, with an option for an additional year. In September 2025, Klaverboer was promoted to starting goalkeeper with SC Heerenveen.

== International career ==
Klaverboer was part of the Netherlands U17 squad for the 2022 UEFA European Under-17 Championship. In November 2025, he was called up to the Netherlands U21s for a set of 2027 UEFA European Under-21 Championship qualification matches.

== Honours ==
Individual

- Eredivisie Talent of the Month: March 2026
