= Zoumana =

Zoumana is a given name. Notable people with the name include:

- Zoumana Bakayogo (born 1986), French footballer
- Zoumana Camara (born 1979), French footballer
- Zoumana Diallo (born 2005), French footballer
- Zoumana Koné (born 1991), Ivorian footballer
- Zoumana Simpara (born 1998), Malian footballer
