= Gottfrid Rapp =

Swedish footballer (born 2005)

Personal information
- Full name: Gottfrid Ebbe Rapp
- Date of birth: 18 August 2005 (age 21)
- Position: Winger

Team information
- Current team: Stabæk IF (on loan from IF Elfsborg)
- Number: 20

Youth career
- Svenljunga IK
- –2023: IF Elfsborg

Senior career*
Years	Team	Apps	(Gls)
2023–	IF Elfsborg	37	(0)
2026–	→ Stabæk IF (loan)	11	(3)

International career^{‡}
2021–2022	Sweden U17	9	(0)
2022–2023	Sweden U19	7	(0)
2024–2025	Sweden U21	5	(0)
- * Club domestic league appearances and goals as of 14 November 2026 ‡ National team caps and goals as of 1 December 2025

Gottfrid Rapp (born 18 August 2005) is a Swedish footballer who plays as a winger for Stabæk Fotball on loan from IF Elfsborg.

== Career ==
He grew up in Svenljunga and started playing for Svenljunga IK as a child.

He was a squad member for the 2022 UEFA European Under-17 Championship. In 2022, he scored 24 goals in 26 matches for Elfsborg U17. He was officially drafted into the first-team squad in April 2023, bypassing the U19 team. He made his Allsvenskan debut in May 2023. Borås Tidning speculated that Rapp might be "Elfsborg's most expensive sale ever".

In 2024 he played under manager Jimmy Thelin, but saw less action after Oscar Hiljemark took over as manager. Nonetheless, Rapp started against Tottenham Hotspur and Nice in the 2024–25 UEFA Europa League. In late 2024 he made his debut for Sweden U21. In the 2024-25 Svenska cupen, he notably scored after 50 seconds against IK Brage, helping his team to a 1–0 victory. Shortly after, in May 2025, he extended his Elfsborg contract until 2029. After being absent from Sweden U21 during the entire summer, he was called up again in November 2025.

Seeing less play in the 2026 Allsvenskan, Rapp was loaned out to Norwegian second-tier club Stabæk for the latter half of 2026.
