= Kazper Karlsson =

Swedish footballer (born 2005)

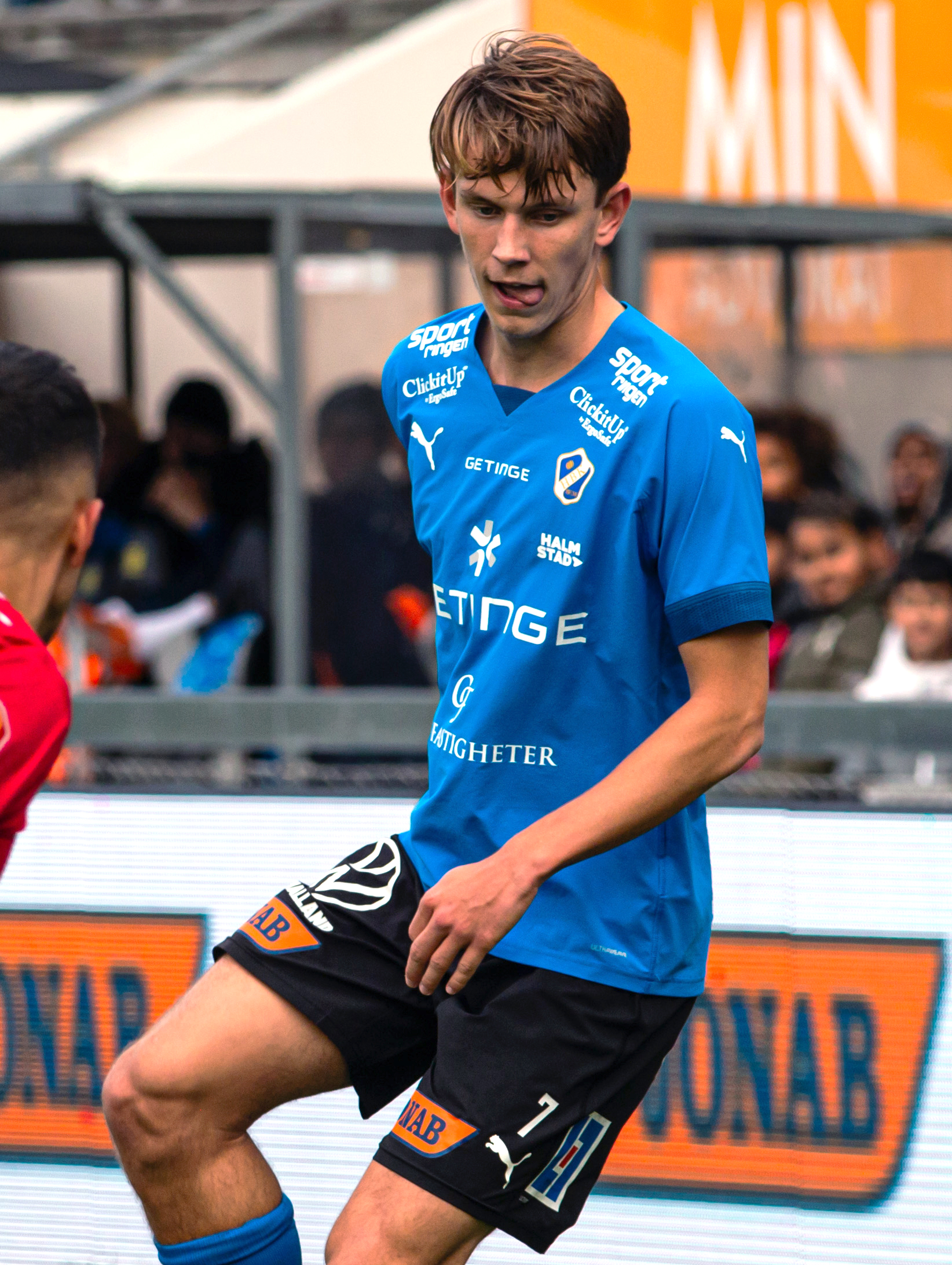

Personal information
- Date of birth: 21 March 2005 (age 21)
- Place of birth: Gothenburg, Sweden
- Height: 1.83 m (6 ft 0 in)
- Position: Midfielder

Team information
- Current team: Degerfors IF on loan from AIK
- Number: 4

Youth career
- BK Häcken
- –2021: Halmstads BK
- 2024: Bologna

Senior career*
Years	Team	Apps	(Gls)
2022–2023	Halmstads BK	42	(2)
2025–	AIK	11	(0)
2025–	→ Degerfors IF (loan)	26	(0)

International career^{‡}
2021–2022	Sweden U17	14	(0)
2022–2024	Sweden U19	10	(0)
2026	Sweden U21	1	(0)
- * Club domestic league appearances and goals as of 22 August 2026 ‡ National team caps and goals as of 22 August 2026

Kazper Karlsson (born 21 March 2005) is a Swedish footballer who plays as a midfielder for Degerfors IF on loan from AIK.

== Career ==
Karlsson grew up in Hisingen and started playing football as a child for BK Häcken, before moving to Halmstads BK at a young age. He made his international debut for Sweden U16 in a double fixture against Denmark U16 in August 2021. He later took part in the 2022 UEFA European Under-17 Championship.

He signed a professional contract with Halmstads BK in July 2021, at the age of 16. He scored his first Allsvenskan goal in May 2023. After BK Häcken reportedly placed a transfer bid in late 2023, Karlsson was also linked to Hammarby before instead going abroad to Bologna Primavera.

Ahead of the Swedish 2025 season, Karlsson was bought back by AIK for 5 or 6 million kr. However, Karlsson fell into disfavour with manager Mikkjal Thomassen, and was loaned out to Degerfors IF. The loan was extended in 2026, and also included an option to buy.

In March 2026, Karlsson made his debut for Sweden U21.

== Personal life ==
He is a relative of Patrik Karlsson Lagemyr.
