= Luka Lijeskić =

Serbian footballer

Personal information
- Full name: Luka Lijeskić
- Date of birth: 23 February 2005 (age 21)
- Place of birth: Belgrade, Serbia and Montenegro
- Height: 1.95 m (6 ft 5 in)
- Position: Goalkeeper

Team information
- Current team: Radnički 1923
- Number: 81

Youth career
- –2022: Brodarac

Senior career*
| Years | Team | Apps | (Gls) |
| 2022–2023 | Brodarac | 0 | (0) |
| 2023–2024 | Gent | 0 | (0) |
| 2024– | Radnički 1923 | 43 | (0) |

International career^{‡}
| 2019 | Serbia U15 | 1 | (0) |
| 2022 | Serbia U17 | 6 | (0) |
| 2022 | Serbia U18 | 4 | (0) |
| 2023 | Serbia U19 | 5 | (0) |
| 2024– | Serbia U21 | 1 | (0) |
- * Club domestic league appearances and goals as of 5 June 2026 ‡ National team caps and goals as of 17 April 2026

Luka Lijeskić (Serbian Cyrillic: Лука Лијескић; born 23 February 2005) is a Serbian professional footballer who plays as a goalkeeper for Radnički 1923.

== Club career ==
Born in Belgrade, Luka is a product of Brodarac's youth football school, In July 2023, as a best goalkeeper on the just-completed 2022 UEFA European Under-17 Championship where Serbia U17 in semi-finals of the same competition lost on penalties against Netherlands U17, the player signed a contract with Belgium club Gent. However, due to his lack of experience and strong competition in the Belgium club, which made him short of the expected minutes, Lukа chose in to come to the middle where he will get a chance to show his potential, So on 20 June 2024 he signed a three-year contract with the Serbian club Radnički 1923. On September 1, in a match against Red Star Belgrade, he made his official debut in the Serbian SuperLiga in Gornji Milanovac on Stadion Metalac for Radnički 1923 where his team lost with the result of 0:1.

== International career ==
He played for the Serbian national teams at U15, U17, U18, U19 and U21 levels.
