= Amit Mashiah =

Israeli advertising executive

- Mashiah
- Born: 1972 (age 53–54)
- Education: College of Management Academic Studies (BA)
- Occupation: Advertising executive
- Title: CEO of McCann Group Israel
- Spouse: Sigal Avin
- Children: 2

Amit Mashiah (Hebrew: עמית משיח; born 1972) is an Israeli advertising executive. He is the chief executive of the McCann Group in Israel, the local affiliate of McCann Worldgroup, a role he has held since January 2018. He is also a board member of McCann Europe. He first joined McCann in 2004, left in 2010 to work at the advertising-technology companies ADAGOO and Eyeview, and returned in 2015 as chief executive of McCann Tel Aviv.

== Early life and education ==
Mashiah was born in 1972 and grew up in Tel Aviv. He served in the Artillery Corps of the Israel Defense Forces. After his military service he studied communication and management at the College of Management Academic Studies, where he earned a bachelor's degree. He later pursued a master's degree in political science and political communication at Tel Aviv University. His academic work included a thesis on the regulation of marketing in the third sector. He also taught the course “Introduction to Modern Political Thought” at Tel Aviv University for five years.

Mashiah co-founded a course on social advertising with Dr. Dan Arav at the School of Communication of the College of Management Academic Studies.

== Career ==
=== McCann Tel Aviv (2004–2010) ===
Mashiah joined McCann Tel Aviv in 2004 and founded McCann Agenda, an in-house unit that used marketing tools to support third-sector organizations and promote social causes through social marketing and pro bono work.

Mashiah later became senior vice president of client services in 2007. His work included campaigns and initiatives for companies such as Cellcom, Samsung, and the Israel Electric Corporation, as well as accounts including HaMashbir LaTzarchan and Tnuva. He was involved in establishing Cellcom’s Volume Centers, a nationwide network of 25 music centers for young people that offered lessons, band activities, rehearsal and recording facilities, and master classes.

One of the unit’s campaigns for Cellcom won a gold Effie Award in Israel in 2008.

=== Advertising technology (2010–2015) ===
Mashiah left McCann in 2010 to become chief executive of ADAGOO, an advertising-technology company that developed technology for analyzing and classifying content and monitoring digital campaigns. In 2012, ADAGOO was acquired by the American company Digital Generation (DG FastChannel). As part of the acquisition, Mashiah moved with his family to New York to develop the company's operations in the American market. He left in 2013 following an organizational restructuring. He then joined Eyeview, a video-advertising company, as vice president of marketing and strategy, a position he held from 2013 to 2015. Eyeview specialized in personalized video advertising.

=== CEO of McCann Tel Aviv and McCann Group (2015–present) ===
Mashiah was appointed chief executive of McCann Tel Aviv in June 2015 and took up the position in September, succeeding Richie Hunter. In 2017, the agency won the Israeli advertising account of Teva. The following year he was appointed chief executive of the McCann Group in Israel following a restructuring of the global group, and joined the board of McCann Europe. In 2019 he was a speaker at Advertising Week New York.

During the COVID-19 pandemic, McCann Tel Aviv cut salaries and reversed the cuts retroactively in December 2020.

== Public activity ==
In January 2002 a group of reserve combat soldiers and officers published a letter announcing that they would no longer serve in the occupied territories. The letter, initiated by reserve officers David Zonshein and Yaniv Itzkovits, led to the founding of Courage to Refuse. Mashiah, then a student at Tel Aviv University, was one of the original signatories and became the group's spokesperson. In 2003 he refused to take part in reserve duty in the Jericho area. That February, he spoke at a rally in New York City.

In 2018 the former government officials Yarom Ariav and Yossi Kucik approached Mashiah to turn their "businesspeople's letter", an economic plan for asylum seekers in South Tel Aviv, into a public campaign, which McCann then supported.

== Recognition ==
In 2016 the School of Communication at the College of Management Academic Studies gave Mashiah its "Tikshorishon" award (תקשוראשון, a Hebrew blend of tikshoret, "communication", and rishon, "first"). Two years later the nonprofit Yeladim BeSikui (Children with a Chance) honored him for his volunteer work.

== Personal life ==
Mashiah is married to the screenwriter Sigal Avin; the couple have two daughters.
