= Gustav Fraulo =

Danish footballer (born 2005)

Personal information
- Full name: Gustav Leone Fraulo
- Date of birth: 23 April 2005 (age 21)
- Place of birth: Odense, Denmark
- Height: 1.83 m (6 ft 0 in)
- Position: Midfielder

Team information
- Current team: Lyngby
- Number: 19

Youth career
- –2016: OKS
- 2016–2024: Midtjylland
- 2023–2024: → Mafra (loan)

Senior career*
Years	Team	Apps	(Gls)
2024–	Lyngby	48	(6)
2024	→ FC Roskilde (loan)	10	(0)

International career
2021	Denmark U16	2	(0)
2021–2022	Denmark U17	14	(0)
2022–2023	Denmark U18	6	(0)
2023	Denmark U19	6	(0)
2025	Denmark U20	1	(0)
- * Club domestic league appearances and goals as of 2 June 2026

Gustav Leone Fraulo (born 23 April 2005) is a Danish footballer who plays as a midfielder for Danish Superliga club Lyngby Boldklub.

== Club career ==
=== FC Midtjylland ===
Born and raised in Odense, Fraulo started his career in the local football club, Odense Kammeraternes Sportsklub. Halfway through the U14 year, Fraulo and his family decided that he should follow in his older brother's footsteps and switched from OKS to FC Midtjylland in 2016. His great talent was also recognized internationally, as he was invited to try out for Dutch giants Ajax in both 2018 and 2019.

Fraulo was a big profile in Midtjylland's successful youth team for several seasons and in February 2023, the 17-year-old signed a new three-year deal with Midtjylland and traveled with the first team to Portugal for a training camp. Just five months later, in June 2023, Fraulo signed a 5-year contract extension with Midtjylland. He had, in the meantime, been called up for six Danish Superliga matches, but had yet to make his debut.

A month later, Fraulo, along with teammates Jonathan Lind and Mads Nybo, moved on a loan deal to Midtjylland's Portuguese partner club, C.D. Mafra. Here he played regularly for the club's U-23 team, which featured in the Portuguese Liga Revelação.He played 15 games for Mafra's U-23 team during his time at the club.

=== Lyngby ===
On 30 January 2024 it was confirmed that Fraulo was leaving Mafra with immediate effect, having signed a 4.5-year contract with Danish Superliga club Lyngby Boldklub. Fraulo made his debut on 3 March 2024, in a Danish Superliga match against Hvidovre, replacing Casper Winther in the 84th minute.

On 2 August 2024 Fraulo was loaned out to Danish 1st Division side FC Roskilde for the rest of 2024. He returned to Lyngby in January 2025. Fraulo made 11 appearances for Roskilde, having been a regular throughout his loan spell.

== Personal life ==
Gustav Fraulo is the younger brother of Oscar Fraulo, who is also a professional football player.

== Honours ==
Lyngby

- Danish 1st Division: 2025–26
