= Katlijk =

Katlijk Ketlik
- Village
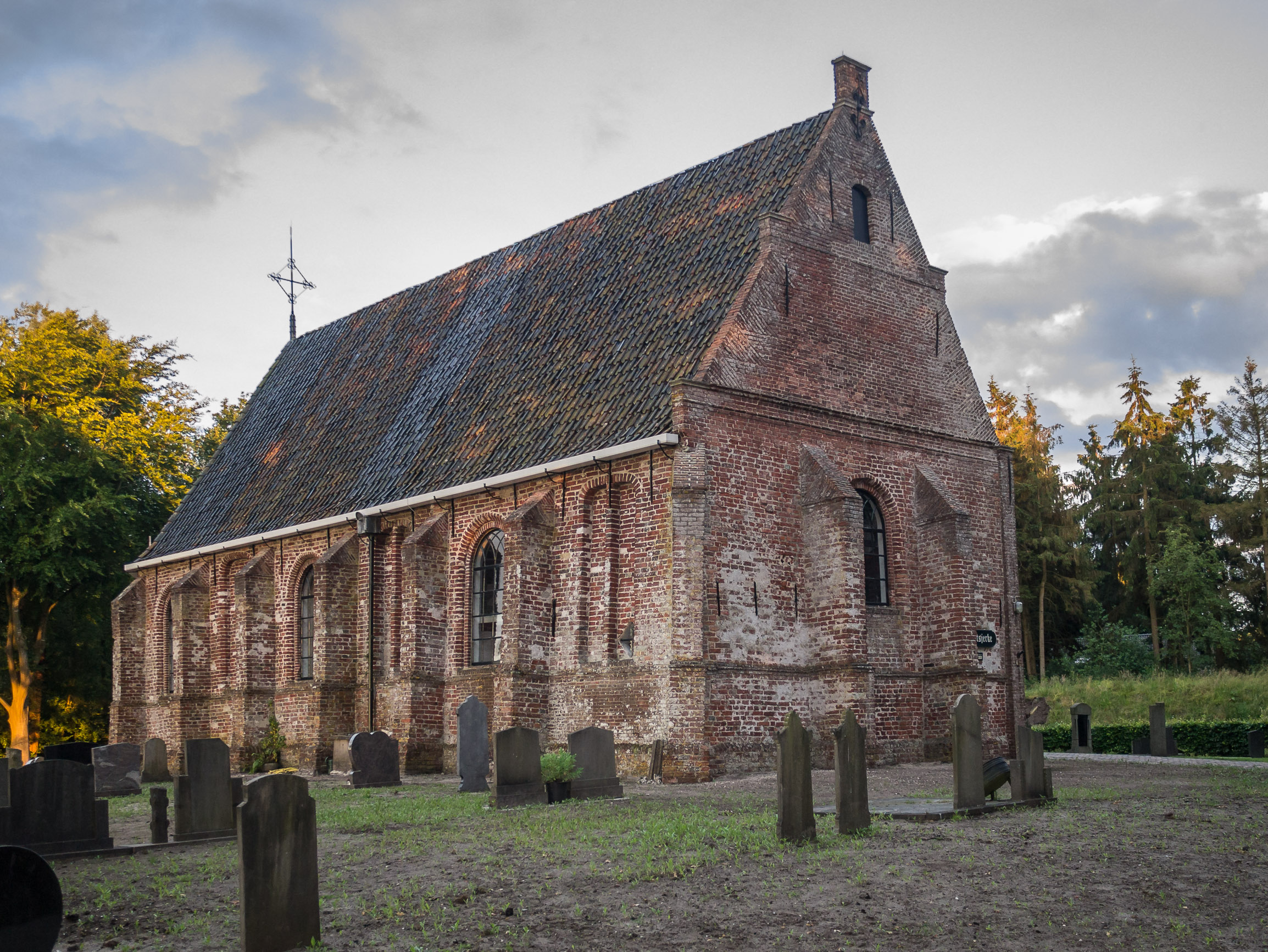
- St Thomas' church

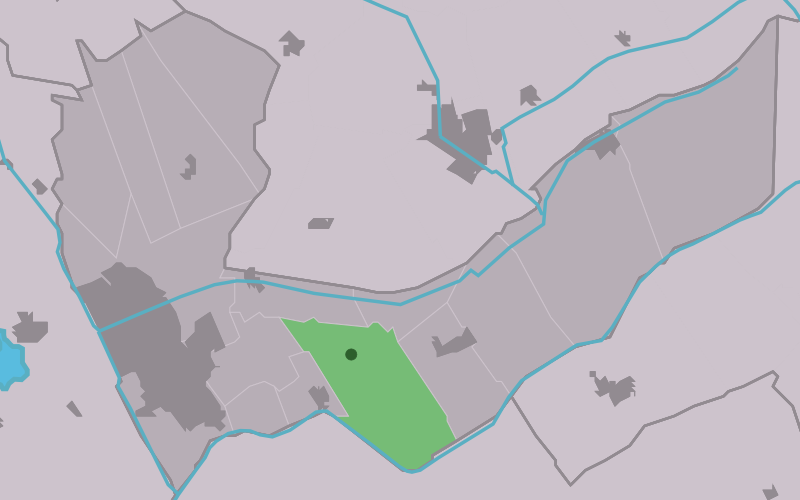
- Location in the Heerenveen municipality

- Location in the Netherlands Katlijk (Netherlands)
- Country: Netherlands
- Province: Friesland
- Municipality: Heerenveen

Area
  - Total: 11.37 km^{2} (4.39 sq mi)
- Elevation: 2 m (6.6 ft)

Population (2021)
  - Total: 585
  - Density: 51.5/km^{2} (133/sq mi)
- Time zone: UTC+1 (CET)
  - Summer (DST): UTC+2 (CEST)
- Postal code: 8455
- Dialing code: 0513

Katlijk (West Frisian: Ketlik) is a village in Heerenveen in the province of Friesland, the Netherlands. It had a population of around 610 in 2017.

== History ==
The village was first mentioned in 1315 as Kathaleke. The etymology is unclear. The village had a chapel as early as 1254. In 1525, a church without tower was built. The double bell tower has been restored in 1930. In 1840, Katlijk was home to 241 people.

Before 1934, Katlijk was part of the Schoterland municipality.

== Gallery ==
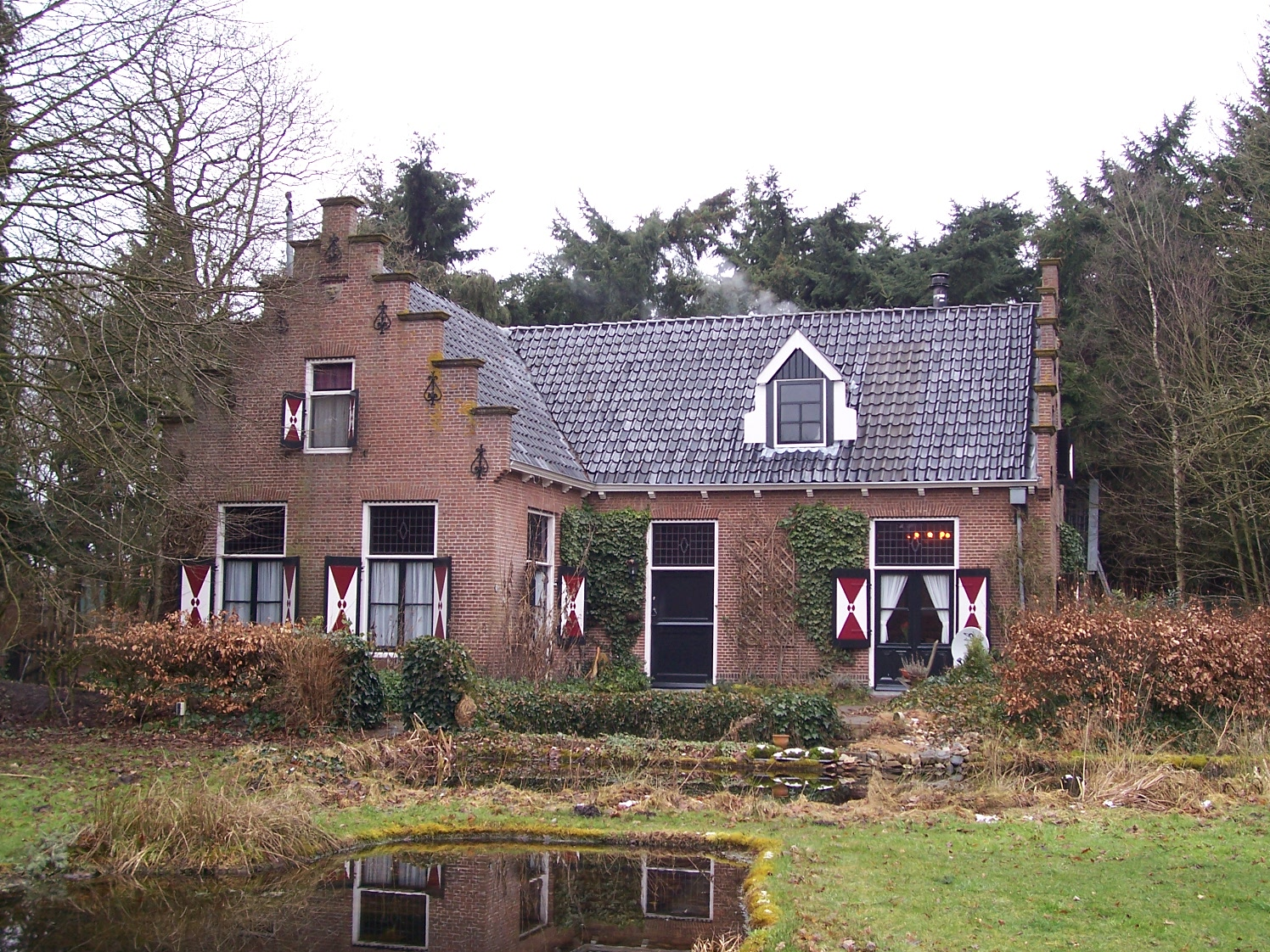
't Slotsje

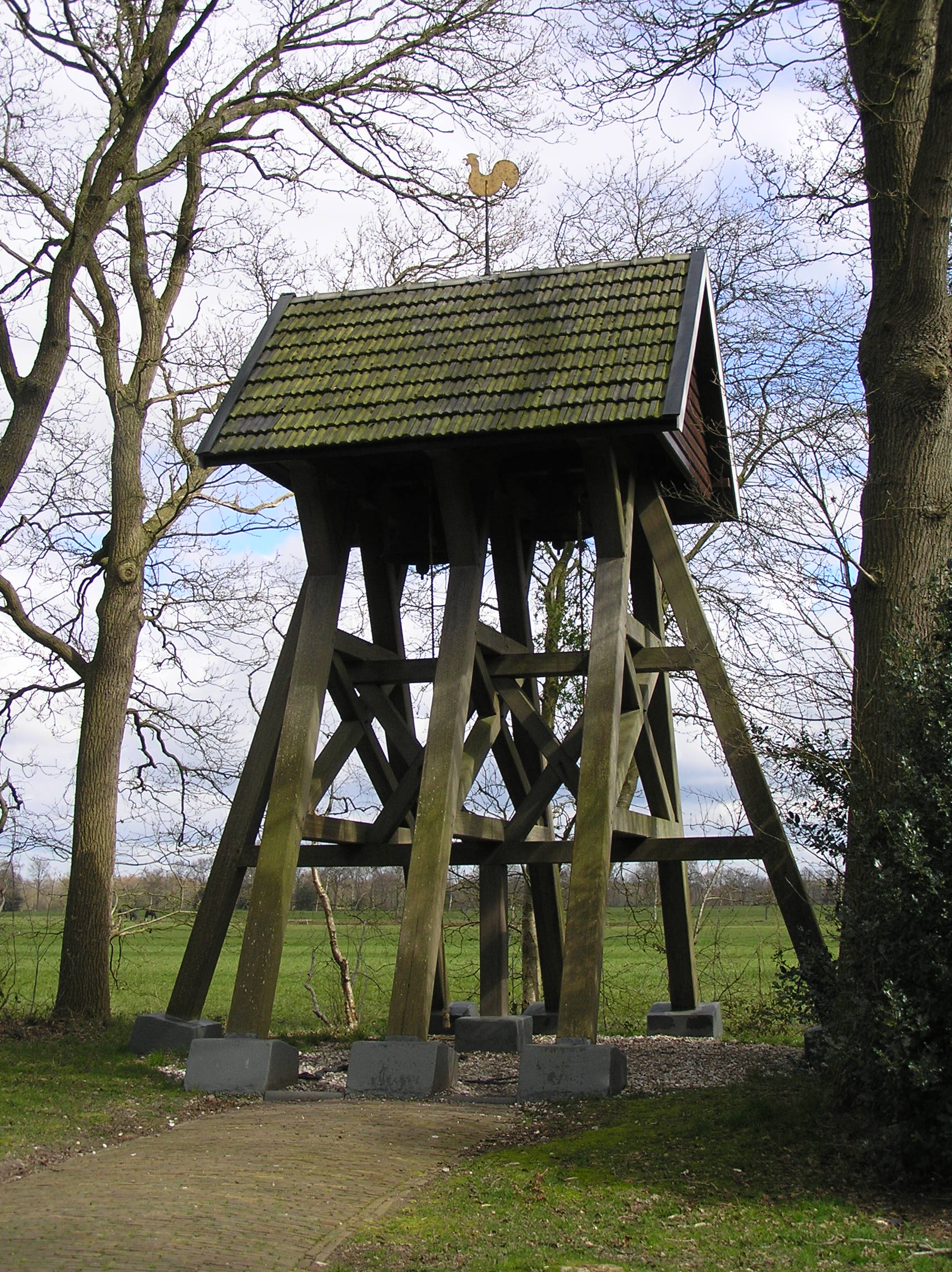
Belfry Katlijk

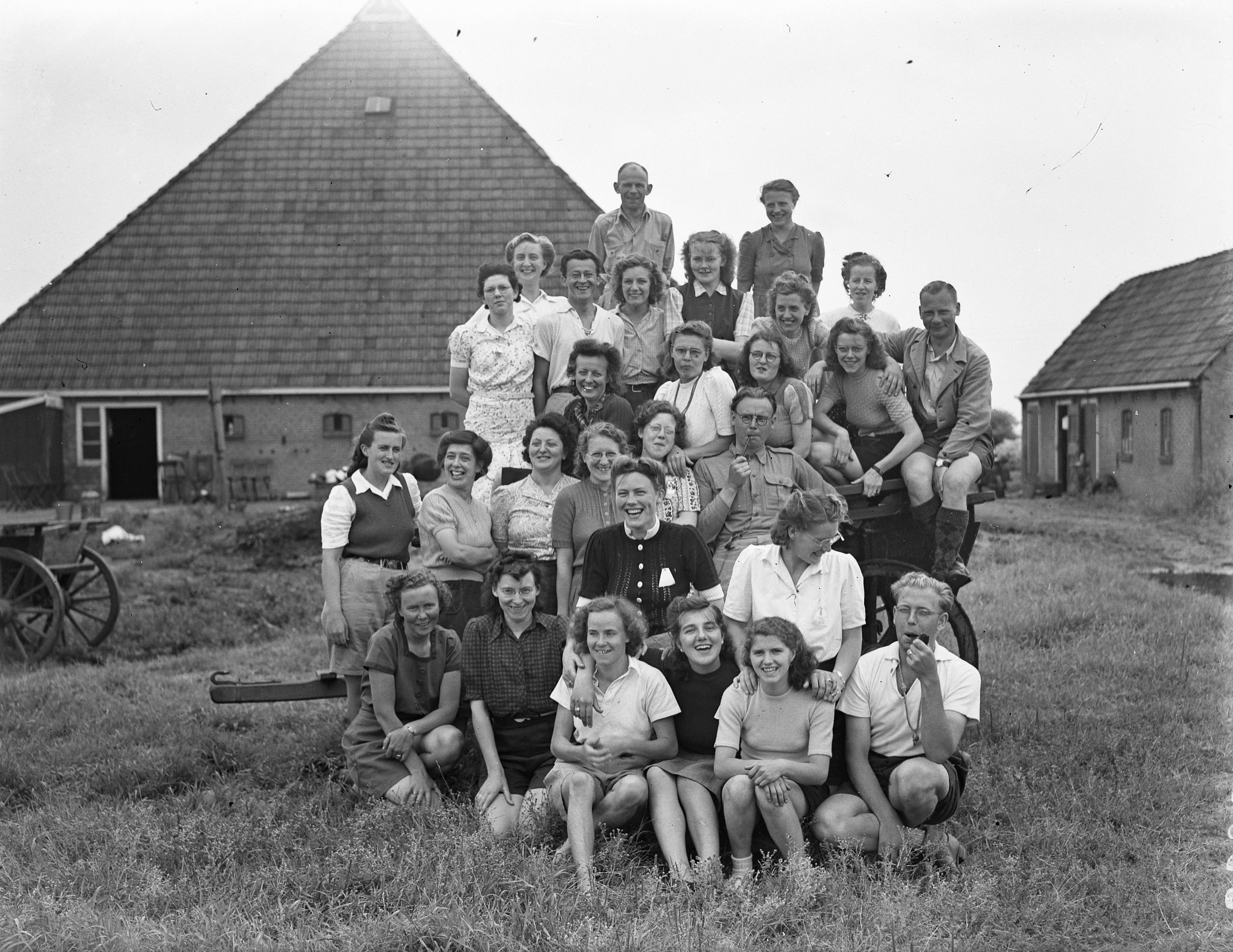
Youth camp Katlijk (1948)
