= Axel Gueguin =

French footballer (born 2005)

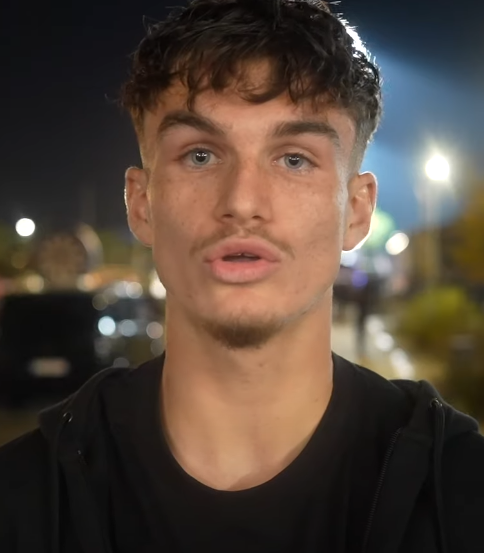
- Gueguin in 2024

Personal information
- Date of birth: 24 March 2005 (age 21)
- Place of birth: Montpellier, France
- Height: 1.70 m (5 ft 7 in)
- Position: Winger

Team information
- Current team: Montpellier
- Number: 22

Youth career
- 2011–2022: Montpellier

Senior career*
Years	Team	Apps	(Gls)
2022–	Montpellier II	31	(5)
2022–	Montpellier	16	(1)

International career
2022	France U17	8	(1)
Medal record
Men's football
Representing France
UEFA European Under-17 Championship
Winner	2022 Israel
- * Club domestic league appearances and goals as of 11 May 2026

Axel Gueguin (born 24 March 2005) is a French professional footballer who plays as a winger for Ligue 2 club Montpellier.

== Club career ==
Gueguin is a youth international for Montpellier since 2011, and was promoted to their reserves for the 2021–22 season. He was promoted to their senior team in advance of the 2022–23 season in the Ligue 1. He made his senior and Ligue 1 as a late substitute with Montpellierin a 4–2 loss to Toulouse FC on 2 October 2022.

== International career ==
Gueguin is a youth international for France, having played for the France U17s in their tournament-winning campaign at the 2022 UEFA European Under-17 Championship.

== Honours ==
France U17

- UEFA European Under-17 Championship: 2022
