= Elison Makolli =

Swedish footballer (born 2005)

Personal information
- Date of birth: 10 January 2005 (age 21)
- Place of birth: Sweden
- Height: 1.86 m (6 ft 1 in)
- Position: Centre-back

Team information
- Current team: AaB
- Number: 33

Youth career
- –2016: LB07
- 2016–2022: Malmö FF

Senior career*
| Years | Team | Apps | (Gls) |
| 2023–2024 | Malmö FF | 12 | (0) |
| 2025– | AaB | 28 | (0) |

International career^{‡}
| 2021–2022 | Sweden U17 | 13 | (0) |
| 2022–2024 | Sweden U19 | 16 | (0) |
| 2024–2025 | Sweden U21 | 4 | (0) |
- * Club domestic league appearances and goals as of 2 June 2026 ‡ National team caps and goals as of 18:11, 19 October 2025 (UTC)

Elison Makolli (born 10 January 2005) is a Swedish professional footballer who plays as a centre-back for Danish 1st Division side AaB.

== Club career ==
After seven years in the club's academy, Makolli signed with Malmö FF's first team on 4 April 2023. Makolli made his Allsvenskan debut against Sirius on 1 July 2023 when he came on as a substitute in the 88th minute.

On February 2, 2025 Makolli joined Danish Superliga side AaB on a four-year deal.

== Personal life ==
Born in Sweden, Makolli is of Kosovan descent. He is a youth international for Sweden.

== Honours ==
Malmö FF

- Allsvenskan: 2023, 2024
- Svenska Cupen: 2023–24
