= João Muniz =

Portuguese footballer (born 2005)

Personal information
- Full name: João António Nascimento Muniz
- Date of birth: 26 June 2005 (age 21)
- Place of birth: Ribeira Brava, Madeira, Portugal
- Height: 1.90 m (6 ft 3 in)
- Position: Centre-back

Team information
- Current team: Sporting B
- Number: 43

Youth career
- 2010–2011: ADRC Aguiar da Beira
- 2012–2014: Académico de Viseu
- 2014–2017: Benfica de Viseu
- 2017–2018: Lusitano FCV
- 2018–2019: AFD O Pinguinzinho
- 2019–2022: Sporting

Senior career*
Years	Team	Apps	(Gls)
2022–	Sporting B	67	(3)
2024–2025	→ Rio Ave (loan)	0	(0)
2025–	Sporting	0	(0)

International career^{‡}
2022	Portugal U17	8	(0)
2022–2023	Portugal U19	8	(0)
2024	Portugal U20	4	(0)
2024–	Portugal U21	9	(0)
- * Club domestic league appearances and goals as of 20 June 2026 ‡ National team caps and goals as of 13:25, 27 October 2025 (UTC)

João António Nascimento Muniz (born 26 June 2005) is a Portuguese professional footballer who plays as a centre-back for Liga Portugal 2 club Sporting B.

== Club career ==
Muniz is a product of the youth academies of the Portuguese clubs ADRC Aguiar da Beira, Académico de Viseu, Benfica de Viseu, Lusitano FCV, AFD O Pinguinzinho, and Sporting. On 18 January 2021 he signed his first professional contract with Sporting, and the following year was promoted to their reserves. On 31 August 2023, he extended his contract with Sporting until 2028. On 30 August 2024, he joined Primeira Liga club Rio Ave on a year-long loan. On 3 February 2025 his loan was cut short and he returned to Sporting B and helped them achieve promotion to the Liga Portugal 2.

On 28 October 2025 Muniz debuted with the senior Sporting team in a 5–1 Taça da Liga win over Alverca.

== International career ==
Born in Portugal, Muniz is of Brazilian descent and holds dual Portuguese and Brazilian citizenship. He was part of the Portugal U17s at the 2022 UEFA European Under-17 Championship. He was also called up to the Portugal U21s for the 2025 UEFA European Under-21 Championship.
