= Vojin Serafimović =

Serbian footballer (born 2005)

Personal information
- Date of birth: 14 October 2005 (age 21)
- Place of birth: Belgrade, Serbia and Montenegro
- Height: 1.90 m (6 ft 3 in)
- Position: Centre-back

Team information
- Current team: Famalicão, on loan from Čukarički
- Number: 30

Youth career
- 2005–2013: FK Leštane
- 2013–2018: OFK Beograd
- 2018–2022: Čukarički

Senior career*
Years	Team	Apps	(Gls)
2022–	Čukarički	38	(1)
2026–	→Famalicão (loan)	0	(0)

International career^{‡}
2019	Serbia U15	2	(0)
2021–2022	Serbia U17	12	(0)
2022	Serbia U18	4	(0)
2023–2024	Serbia U19	8	(1)
2024–2025	Serbia U21	4	(0)
- * Club domestic league appearances and goals as of 13:40, 21 April 2026 (UTC) ‡ National team caps and goals as of 13:40, 21 April 2026 (UTC)

Vojin Serafimović (Serbian: Војин Серафимовић; born 14 October 2005) is a Serbian professional football player who plays as a centre-back for Primeira Liga club Famalicão, on loan from Čukarički.

== Career ==
Serafimović began playing football with his local FK Leštane, before moving to OFK Beograd and finally ending his development with Čukarički in 2018. On 8 April 2022, he signed his first professional contract with Čukarički. He debuted with Čukarički in a 2–0 Serbian Cup win over FK Zlatibor Čajetina on 18 October 2022. On 25 April 2023, he extended his contract with the club until 2026. On 2 February 2026, he transferred to Primeira Liga club Famalicão on loan with an option to buy.

== International career ==
Serafimović first played for the Serbia U15s in a friendly tournament in 2019. He was called up to the Serbia U17s at the 2022 UEFA European Under-17 Championship.
