= Tom Saettel =

French footballer (born 2005)

Personal information
- Date of birth: 19 June 2005 (age 21)
- Place of birth: Strasbourg, France
- Height: 1.67 m (5 ft 6 in)
- Position: Left winger

Team information
- Current team: Pau

Youth career
- 2010–2011: US Dachstein
- 2011–2014: Geispolsheim
- 2014–2022: Strasbourg

Senior career*
Years	Team	Apps	(Gls)
2022–2025	Strasbourg B	47	(6)
2024–2025	Strasbourg	0	(0)
2025–2026	Haguenau	23	(6)
2026–	Pau	0	(0)

International career^{‡}
2021–2022	France U17	15	(3)
2022–2023	France U18	3	(0)
Medal record
Men's football
Representing France
UEFA European Under-17 Championship
Winner	2022 Israel
- * Club domestic league appearances and goals as of 16 May 2026 ‡ National team caps and goals as of 27 March 2023

Tom Saettel (born 19 June 2005) is a French professional footballer who plays as a left winger for Ligue 2 club Pau.

== Early life ==
Born in Strasbourg, Saettel started football at US Dachstein, where he played for a season before joining FC Geispolsheim where he was upgraded, notably playing with the 2003 generation. He signed for RC Strasbourg at the age 8 years old. Although he did not want to leave Geispolsheim at first in order to stay and play with his friends, he ultimately decided to join the Strasbourg after his father convinced him.

On 15 September 2022, Saettel signed his first professional contract with RC Strasbourg until 2025.

== International career ==
In April 2022, he was selected with France U17 team for the 2022 UEFA European Under-17 Championship. He stood out in particular during the quarter-finals, opening the score against Germany in a 1–1 draw. France later advance to the semi-finals after winning in the penalty shootouts. finally won after a penalty shootout. He then participated in semi-finals and started in the final, as France won the tournament.

== Honours ==
U17 France

- UEFA European Under-17 Championship: 2022
