= Ivan Lima =

Portuguese footballer

Personal information
- Full name: Ivan Correia Posser Lima
- Date of birth: 13 January 2005 (age 21)
- Place of birth: Lisbon, Portugal
- Height: 1.74 m (5 ft 9 in)
- Position: Winger

Team information
- Current team: Piast Gliwice
- Number: 90

Youth career
- 2011–2024: Benfica

Senior career*
Years	Team	Apps	(Gls)
2024–2026	Benfica B	29	(0)
2025–2026	Benfica	1	(0)
2026–	Piast Gliwice	3	(0)

International career^{‡}
2021–2022	Portugal U17	16	(5)
2022–2023	Portugal U18	9	(0)
2023–2024	Portugal U19	8	(1)
2024	Portugal U20	4	(0)
- * Club domestic league appearances and goals as of 22:00, 29 May 2026 (UTC) ‡ National team caps and goals as of 11:03, 10 February 2026 (UTC)

Ivan Correia Posser Lima (born 13 January 2005) is a Portuguese professional footballer who plays as a winger for Ekstraklasa club Piast Gliwice.

== Club career ==
A youth product of Benfica, Lima signed his first professional contract with the club on 6 January 2022. On 24 May 2023, he extended his contract with Benfica. He was promoted to Benfica B in 2024. On 17 October 2025, he made his debut with the senior Benfica side in a 2–0 Taça de Portugal win over Chaves on 17 October 2025.

On 10 February 2026, having spent nearly 15 years at Benfica, Lima left Portugal to join Polish Ekstraklasa side Piast Gliwice on a deal until 2029.

== International career ==
Born in Portugal, Lima is of Santomean descent. He was called up to the Portugal U17s for the 2022 UEFA European Under-17 Championship.

== Personal life ==
Lima is a fan of anime.

== Career statistics ==
As of match played 6 April 2026

Appearances and goals by club, season and competition
Club	Season	League			National cup (Note: Includes Taça de Portugal)		Continental		Other		Total	
Club	Season	Division	Apps	Goals	Apps	Goals	Apps	Goals	Apps	Goals	Apps	Goals
Benfica B	2023–24	Liga Portugal 2	2	0	—		—		—		2	0
Benfica B	2024–25	Liga Portugal 2	10	0	—		—		—		10	0
Benfica B	2025–26	Liga Portugal 2	17	0	—		—		—		17	0
Benfica B	Total		29	0	0	0	0	0	0	0	29	0
Benfica	2025–26	Liga Portugal	1	0	1	0	0	0	0	0	2	0
Piast Gliwice	2025–26	Ekstraklasa	3	0	—		—		—		3	0
Career total			33	0	1	0	0	0	0	0	34	0
