= Sofiane Ikene =

Luxembourgish footballer (born 2005)

Personal information
- Date of birth: 27 February 2005 (age 21)
- Place of birth: Luxembourg
- Height: 1.81 m (5 ft 11 in)
- Position: Centre-back

Team information
- Current team: Rot-Weiß Erfurt
- Number: 4

Youth career
- –2021: F91 Dudelange

Senior career*
Years	Team	Apps	(Gls)
2021–2022	F91 Dudelange	4	(1)
2022–2023	Progrès Niederkorn	0	(0)
2023–2025	1. FC Nürnberg II	24	(0)
2025–	Rot-Weiß Erfurt	26	(2)

International career^{‡}
2019	Luxembourg U15	1	(0)
2021–2022	Luxembourg U17	6	(0)
2023	Luxembourg U19	7	(0)
2023–	Luxembourg U21	4	(0)
2022–	Luxembourg	2	(0)
- * Club domestic league appearances and goals as of 23 September 2026 ‡ National team caps and goals as of 25 March 2025

Sofiane Ikene (born 27 February 2005) is a Luxembourgish footballer who plays as a centre-back for German Regionalliga Nordost club Rot-Weiß Erfurt.

== International career ==
Born in Luxembourg, Ikene is of Algerian descent.

He has represented the Luxembourg senior national team, having made his debut in a 2022–23 UEFA Nations League match against Faroe Islands on 14 June 2022.
