= Zoumana Diallo =

French footballer (born 2007)

Personal information
- Date of birth: 2 February 2005 (age 21)
- Place of birth: Strasbourg, France
- Height: 1.85 m (6 ft 1 in)
- Position: Forward

Team information
- Current team: Nice
- Number: 44

Youth career
- 2013–2014: FCOSK 06
- 2014–2022: Strasbourg

Senior career*
Years	Team	Apps	(Gls)
2022–2025	Strasbourg II	28	(5)
2024	→ Royal Excelsior Virton (loan)	9	(2)
2025	Strasbourg	0	(0)
2025–	Nice	2	(0)

International career^{‡}
2021–2022	France U17	9	(5)
- * Club domestic league appearances and goals as of 22:50, 22 August 2026 (UTC) ‡ National team caps and goals as of 23:28, 16 May 2026 (UTC)

Zoumana Diallo (born 2 February 2005) is a French professional footballer who plays as a forward for Ligue 1 club Nice.

== Career ==
Diallo is a product of the youth academies of the French clubs FCOSK 06 and Strasbourg. On 12 January 2024, he joined the Belgian club Royal Excelsior Virton for the second half of the 2023–24 season in the Belgian Division 1. On 2 May 2025, he debuted with the senior Strasbourg team as a substitute in a 3–1 Coupe de France loss to Angers. On 29 July 2025, he transferred to Nice.

== International career ==
Born in France, Diallo is of Malian descent. He was part of the France U17s that won the 2022 UEFA European Under-17 Championship.

== Career statistics ==
As of match played 22 August 2026

Appearances and goals by club, season and competition
Club	Season	League			National cup		Europe		Other		Total	
Club	Season	Division	Apps	Goals	Apps	Goals	Apps	Goals	Apps	Goals	Apps	Goals
Strasbourg II	2021–22	CFA 2	0	0	—		—		—		0	0
Strasbourg II	2022–23	CFA 2	7	1	—		—		—		7	1
Strasbourg II	2024–25	CFA 1	21	4	—		—		—		21	4
Strasbourg II	Total		28	5	—		—		—		28	5
Royal Excelsior Virton (loan)	2023–24	Belgian Division 1	9	2	—		—		—		9	2
Strasbourg	2024–25	Ligue 1	0	0	0	0	—		—		0	0
Nice	2025–26	Ligue 1	1	0	3	1	0	0	0	0	4	1
Nice	2026–27	Ligue 1	1	0	0	0	—		—		1	0
Nice	Total		2	0	3	1	0	0	0	0	5	1
Career total			39	7	3	1	0	0	0	0	42	8

== Honours ==
France U17

- UEFA European Under-17 Championship: 2022
