= 2022 UEFA European Under-17 Championship =

אליפות אירופה עד גיל 17 של אופ"א 2022

Tournament details
- Host country: Israel
- Dates: 16 May – 1 June
- Teams: 16 (from 1 confederation)
- Venue: 5 (in 5 host cities)

Final positions
- Champions: France (3rd title)
- Runners-up: Netherlands

Tournament statistics
- Matches played: 31
- Goals scored: 101 (3.26 per match)
- Attendance: 23,834 (769 per match)
- Top scorer: (Serbia) Jovan Milošević (5 goals)

The 2022 UEFA European Under-17 Championship (also known as UEFA Under-17 Euro 2022) was the 19th UEFA European Under-17 Championship (38th edition if the Under-16 era is also included), the annual international youth football championship organised by UEFA for the men's under-17 national teams of Europe. Israel was hosting the tournament. A total of 16 teams played in the tournament, with players born on or after 1 January 2005 eligible to participate.

Netherlands, having won the title in 2018 and 2019, were the two-times title holders, since the 2020 and 2021 editions were cancelled due to the COVID-19 pandemic in Europe and the title was not awarded.

== Host selection ==
The timeline of host selection was as follows:

- 11 January 2019: bidding procedure launched
- 28 February 2019: deadline to express interest
- 27 March 2019: Announcement by UEFA that declaration of interest were received from 17 member associations to host one of the UEFA national team youth final tournaments (UEFA European Under-19 Championship, UEFA Women's Under-19 Championship, UEFA European Under-17 Championship, UEFA Women's Under-17 Championship) in 2021 and 2022 (although it was not specified which association were interested in which tournament)
- 28 June 2019: Submission of bid dossiers
- 24 September 2019: Selection of successful host associations by the UEFA Executive Committee at its meeting in Ljubljana

For the UEFA European Under-17 Championship final tournaments of 2021 and 2022, Cyprus and Israel were selected as hosts respectively.

== Qualification ==
All 55 UEFA nations entered the competition, and with the hosts Israel qualifying automatically, the other 54 teams will compete in the qualifying competition, which will consist of two rounds: Qualifying round, which will take place in autumn 2021, and Elite round, which will take place in spring 2022, to determine the remaining 15 spots in the final tournament. The draw for the qualifying round was held on 9 December 2020 at the UEFA headquarters in Nyon, Switzerland.

=== Qualified teams ===
The following teams qualified for the final tournament.

Note: All appearance statistics include only U-17 era (since 2002).

Team	Method of qualification	Appearance	Last appearance	Previous best performance
Israel	Hosts	4th	2018 (group stage)	Group stage (2003, 2005, 2018)
Netherlands	Elite round Group 1 winners	14th	2019 (champions)	Champions (2011, 2012, 2018, 2019)
Denmark	Elite round Group 2 winners	6th	2018 (group stage)	Semifinals (2011)
Germany	Elite round Group 3 winners	13th	2019 (group stage)	Champions (2009)
Spain	Elite round Group 4 winners	14th	2019 (semifinals)	Champions (2007, 2008, 2017)
France	Elite round Group 5 winners	13th	2019 (semifinals)	Champions (2004, 2015)
Italy	Elite round Group 6 winners	10th	2019 (runners-up)	Runners-up (2013, 2018, 2019)
Serbia	Elite round Group 7 winners	8th^{2}	2018 (group stage)	Quarterfinals (2002)^{3}
Portugal	Elite round Group 8 winners	9th	2019 (quarterfinals)	Champions (2003, 2016)
Sweden	Elite round Group 2 runners-up^{1}	5th	2019 (group stage)	Semifinals (2013)
Belgium	Elite round Group 4 runners-up^{1}	8th	2019 (sixth place)	Semifinals (2007, 2015, 2018)
Scotland	Elite round Group 3 runners-up^{1}	6th	2017 (group stage)	Semifinals (2014)
Turkey	Elite round Group 7 runners-up^{1}	8th	2017 (semifinals)	Champions (2005)
Poland	Elite round Group 6 runners-up^{1}	3rd	2012 (semifinals)	Semifinals (2012)
Bulgaria	Elite round Group 8 runners-up^{1}	2nd	2015 (group stage)	Group stage (2015)
Luxembourg	Elite round Group 5 runners-up^{1}	2nd	2006 (group stage)	Group stage (2006)

Notes
^{1} The best seven runners-up among all eight elite round groups qualified for the final tournament.
^{2} Two as Serbia and Montenegro and six as Serbia
^{3} As Serbia and Montenegro

=== Final draw ===
The winner and runners-up of Group 6 were not known at the time of the draw.

Pos	Grp	Team	Pld	W	D	L	GF	GA	GD	Pts	Seeding
1	—	Israel (H)	0	0	0	0	0	0	0	0	Host (A1)
2	8	Portugal	2	2	0	0	11	2	+9	6	Pot 1
3	3	Germany	2	2	0	0	7	0	+7	6	Pot 1
4	5	France	2	2	0	0	5	1	+4	6	Pot 1
5	4	Spain	2	2	0	0	5	1	+4	6	Pot 1
6	2	Denmark	2	1	1	0	7	2	+5	4	Pot 1
7	1	Netherlands	2	1	1	0	2	0	+2	4	Pot 1
8	7	Serbia	2	1	1	0	5	4	+1	4	Pot 1
9	6	Italy	2	2	0	0	4	1	+3	6	A3
10	2	Sweden	2	1	1	0	4	2	+2	4	Pot 2
11	4	Belgium	2	1	0	1	6	1	+5	3	Pot 2
12	3	Scotland	2	1	0	1	6	5	+1	3	Pot 2
13	7	Turkey	2	1	0	1	6	6	0	3	Pot 2
14	6	Poland	2	1	0	1	3	3	0	3	Pot 2
15	8	Bulgaria	2	1	0	1	2	2	0	3	Pot 2
16	5	Luxembourg	2	1	0	1	2	2	0	3	Pot 2

Source: UEFA
Rules for classification: 1) points; 2) goal difference; 3) goals scored; 4) disciplinary points; 5) coefficient; 6) drawing of lots.
(H) Hosts

== Venues ==
The tournament is hosted in five venues:

2022 UEFA European Under-17 Championship venues
Netanya	2022 UEFA European Under-17 Championship is located in Israel	Rishon LeZion
Netanya Stadium	2022 UEFA European Under-17 Championship is located in Israel	Haberfeld Stadium
Capacity: 13,610	2022 UEFA European Under-17 Championship is located in Israel	Capacity: 6,000
2 quarter-finals, 2 semi-finals & final	2022 UEFA European Under-17 Championship is located in Israel	1 quarter-final & 6 group matches
Ness Ziona	Lod	Ramat Gan
Ness Ziona Stadium	Lod Municipal Stadium	Ramat Gan Stadium
Capacity: 3,025	Capacity: 3,300	Capacity: 13,370
1 quarter-final & 6 group matches	6 group matches	6 group matches

== Match officials ==
The following officials were appointed for the final tournament:

Referees

- (Armenia) Henrik Nalbandyan
- (Austria) Christian-Petru Ciochirca
- (Croatia) Dario Bel
- (France) Willy Delajod
- (Iceland) Helgi Mikael Jónasson
- (North Macedonia) Igor Stojčevski
- (Romania) Andrei Florin Chivulete
- (Wales) Tom Owen

Assistant referees

- (Armenia) Khachatur Hovhannisyan
- (Austria) Maximilian Weiß
- (Bulgaria) Miroslav Maksimov
- (Croatia) Luka Pušić
- (Czech Republic) Matěj Vlček
- (Estonia) Sander Saga
- (France) Erwan Finjean
- (Iceland) Gylfi Már Sigurðsson
- (North Macedonia) Daniel Vasilevski
- (Norway) Isaak Elias Skjeseth Bashevkin
- (Romania) Alexandru Cerei
- (Wales) Johnathon Bryant

Fourth officials

- (Albania) Juxhin Xhaja
- (Israel) David Fuxman
- (Israel) Snir Levi
- (Luxembourg) Jasmin Šabotić

== Group stage ==
The final tournament schedule was announced on 31 March 2022.

The group winners and runners-up advance to the quarter-finals.

Tie-breaking criteria for group play
The ranking of teams in the group stage is determined as follows:
1. Points obtained in all group matches;
2. Points in head-to-head matches among tied teams;
3. Goal difference in head-to-head matches among tied teams;
4. Goals scored in head-to-head matches among tied teams;
5. If more than two teams are tied, and after applying all head-to-head criteria above, a subset of teams are still tied, all head-to-head criteria above are reapplied exclusively to this subset of teams;
6. Goal difference in all group matches;
7. Goals scored in all group matches;
8. Penalty shoot-out if only two teams have the same number of points, and they met in the last round of the group and are tied after applying all criteria above (not used if more than two teams have the same number of points, or if their rankings are not relevant for qualification for the next stage);
9. Disciplinary points
  - Yellow card: −1 point;
  - Indirect red card (second yellow card): −3 points;
  - Direct red card: −3 points;
10. UEFA coefficient for the qualifying round draw;
11. Drawing of lots.

=== Group A ===
Pos	Team	Pld	W	D	L	GF	GA	GD	Pts	Qualification
1	Germany	3	3	0	0	9	2	+7	9	Knockout stage
2	Italy	3	2	0	1	4	3	+1	6	Knockout stage
3	Israel (H)	3	1	0	2	3	4	−1	3	
4	Luxembourg	3	0	0	3	0	7	−7	0	

Source: UEFA
Rules for classification: Group stage tiebreakers
(H) Hosts
16 May 2022
17:30

Italy	2–3	Germany
Bruno 44'; Bolzan 48'	Report	Bischof 24'; Wanner 27'; Pejčinović 56'

Ness Ziona Stadium, Ness Ziona
Attendance: 483
Referee: Willy Delajod (France)
16 May 2022
20:00

Israel	3–0	Luxembourg
Yusopove 78', 82'; Zoabi 87'	Report

Haberfeld Stadium, Rishon LeZion
Attendance: 1,424
Referee: Andrei Florin Chivulete (Romania)

19 May 2022
17:30

Germany	3–0	Luxembourg
Weiper 7'; Ulrich 27'; Ibrahimović 70'	Report

Haberfeld Stadium, Rishon LeZion
Attendance: 184
Referee: Igor Stojčevski (North Macedonia)
19 May 2022
20:00

Israel	0–1	Italy
	Report	Esposito 75'

Ness Ziona Stadium, Ness Ziona
Attendance: 2,276
Referee: Christian-Petru Ciochirca (Austria)

22 May 2022
20:00

Germany	3–0	Israel
Weiper 59'; Raebiger 64', 67'	Report

Lod Municipal Stadium, Lod
Attendance: 2,600
Referee: Dario Bel (Croatia)
22 May 2022
20:00

Luxembourg	0–1	Italy
	Report	Di Maggio 25' (pen.)

Ramat Gan Stadium, Ramat Gan
Attendance: 139
Referee: Tom Owen (Wales)

=== Group B ===
Pos	Team	Pld	W	D	L	GF	GA	GD	Pts	Qualification
1	Netherlands	3	3	0	0	8	3	+5	9	Knockout stage
2	France	3	2	0	1	11	4	+7	6	Knockout stage
3	Poland	3	0	1	2	3	9	−6	1	
4	Bulgaria	3	0	1	2	2	8	−6	1	

Source: UEFA
Rules for classification: Group stage tiebreakers
16 May 2022
17:30

France	6–1	Poland
Doué 6' (pen.), 15'; Gueguin 27'; Diallo 40'; Tel 64'; Byar 66'	Report	Drachal 74'

Ramat Gan Stadium, Ramat Gan
Attendance: 270
Referee: Christian-Petru Ciochirca (Austria)
16 May 2022
20:00

Bulgaria	1–3	Netherlands
Georgiev 10'	Report	Misehouy 30'; Babadi 60'; Van Duiven 90+1'

Lod Municipal Stadium, Lod
Attendance: 132
Referee: Igor Stojčevski (North Macedonia)

19 May 2022
17:30

Netherlands	2–1	Poland
Huijsen 51' (pen.); Boerhout 90+3'	Report	Guercio 88'

Lod Municipal Stadium, Lod
Attendance: 262
Referee: Helgi Mikael Jónasson (Iceland)
19 May 2022
20:00

France	4–0	Bulgaria
Tel 29', 44'; Aiki 86'; Zaïre-Emery 89'	Report

Ramat Gan Stadium, Ramat Gan
Attendance: 340
Referee: Andrei Chivulete (Romania)

22 May 2022
17:30

Netherlands	3–1	France
Huijsen 76' (pen.); Milambo 81'; Boerhout 90+4'	Report	Diallo 13'

Haberfeld Stadium, Rishon LeZion
Attendance: 1,170
Referee: Henrik Nalbandyan (Armenia)
22 May 2022
17:30

Poland	1–1	Bulgaria
Sławiński 47'	Report	Traykov 83'

Ness Ziona Stadium, Ness Ziona
Attendance: 52
Referee: Christian-Petru Ciochirca (Austria)

=== Group C ===
Pos	Team	Pld	W	D	L	GF	GA	GD	Pts	Qualification
1	Spain	3	2	1	0	5	1	+4	7	Knockout stage
2	Serbia	3	1	2	0	4	3	+1	5	Knockout stage
3	Belgium	3	1	1	1	4	4	0	4	
4	Turkey	3	0	0	3	2	7	−5	0	

Source: UEFA
Rules for classification: Group stage tiebreakers
17 May 2022
17:30

Serbia	1–1	Belgium
Milošević 88' (pen.)	Report	Idumbo-Muzambo 17'

Haberfeld Stadium, Rishon LeZion
Attendance: 164
Referee: Helgi Mikael Jónasson (Iceland)
17 May 2022
20:00

Turkey	0–2	Spain
	Report	Rodriguez 41'; Bravo 53'

Ness Ziona Stadium, Ness Ziona
Attendance: 162
Referee: Dario Bel (Croatia)

20 May 2022
14:30

Serbia	2–1	Turkey
Šljivić 17'; Milošević 52'	Report	Uzun 43'

Haberfeld Stadium, Rishon LeZion
Attendance: 285
Referee: Tom Owen (Wales)
20 May 2022
16:30

Spain	2–0	Belgium
Boñar 12'; Bravo 45'	Report

Ness Ziona Stadium, Ness Ziona
Attendance: 1,035
Referee: Henrik Nalbandyan (Armenia)

23 May 2022
17:30

Spain	1–1	Serbia
Mella 76'	Report	Milošević 88' (pen.)

Haberfeld Stadium, Rishon LeZion
Attendance: 558
Referee: Willy Delajod (France)
23 May 2022
17:30

Belgium	3–1	Turkey
Idumbo-Muzambo 62' (pen.); Spileers 73'; Talbi 77'	Report	Uzun 76'

Ness Ziona Stadium, Ness Ziona
Attendance: 102
Referee: Andrei Chivulete (Romania)

=== Group D ===
Pos	Team	Pld	W	D	L	GF	GA	GD	Pts	Qualification
1	Denmark	3	2	0	1	7	4	+3	6 (Note: Ranked on head-to-head goal difference: Denmark +1, Portugal 0, Sweden -1.)	Knockout stage
2	Portugal	3	2	0	1	10	6	+4	6	Knockout stage
3	Sweden	3	2	0	1	5	5	0	6	
4	Scotland	3	0	0	3	2	9	−7	0	

Source: UEFA
Rules for classification: Group stage tiebreakers
Notes:
17 May 2022
17:30

Denmark	1–2	Sweden
Sahsah 59'	Report	Kanga 3' (pen.), 24'

Ramat Gan Stadium, Ramat Gan
Attendance: 190
Referee: Henrik Nalbandyan (Armenia)
17 May 2022
20:00

Scotland	1–5	Portugal
Mackenzie 62'	Report	Lima 8'; Rodrigues 26'; Veloso 37' (pen.); Moreira 69'; Ribeiro 73'

Lod Municipal Stadium, Lod
Attendance: 204
Referee: Thomas Gary Owen (Wales)

20 May 2022
14:30

Denmark	3–1	Scotland
Simmelhack 33'; Mackenzie 47' (o.g.); Jensen 71'	Report	Wilson 35'

Ramat Gan Stadium, Ramat Gan
Attendance: 185
Referee: Dario Bel (Croatia)
20 May 2022
16:30

Portugal	4–2	Sweden
Ribeiro 32'; Veloso 37', 60'; Moreira 45+1'	Report	Kanga 7'; De Oliveira 80'

Lod Municipal Stadium, Lod
Attendance: 620
Referee: Willy Delajod (France)

23 May 2022
20:00

Portugal	1–3	Denmark
Lima 30'	Report	Nartey 62'; Hansborg-Sørensen 70'; Gomes 90' (o.g.)

Ramat Gan Stadium, Ramat Gan
Attendance: 283
Referee: Igor Stojčevski (North Macedonia)
23 May 2022
20:00

Sweden	1–0	Scotland
Kanga 66'	Report

Lod Municipal Stadium, Lod
Attendance: 113
Referee: Helgi Mikael Jónasson (Iceland)

== Knockout stage ==
The schedule for the knockout stage was released on 26 April 2022.

=== Bracket ===
Quarter-finals
25 May – Rishon LeZion
Germany	1 (3)
France	1 (4)
26 May – Netanya
Spain	1
Portugal	2
25 May – Netanya
Netherlands	2
Italy	1
26 May – Ness Ziona
Denmark	1
Serbia	2

Semi-finals
29 May – Netanya
France	2 (6)
Portugal	2 (5)
29 May – Netanya
Netherlands	2 (5)
Serbia	2 (3)

Final
1 June – Netanya
France	2
Netherlands	1

=== Quarter-finals ===
The quarter-finals took place on 25 May and 26 May.

25 May 2022
17:30

Germany	1–1	France
Weiper 38'	Report	Saettel 19'
Penalties
Schulz (penalty scored); Pejčinović (penalty scored); Bischof (penalty missed); Ibrahimović (penalty scored); Krattenmacher (penalty missed); Fritschi (penalty missed)	3–4	(penalty missed) Zaïre-Emery; (penalty missed) Byar; (penalty scored) Atangana Edoa; (penalty scored) Kabamba; (penalty scored) Tel; (penalty scored) Diallo

Haberfeld Stadium, Rishon LeZion
Attendance: 1,012
Referee: Dario Bel (Croatia)
25 May 2022
20:00

Netherlands	2–1	Italy
Misehouy 27'; Van Duiven 43'	Report	Lipani 64'

Netanya Stadium, Netanya
Attendance: 340
Referee: Willy Delajod (France)
26 May 2022
17:30

Denmark	1–2	Serbia
E. Højlund 48'	Report	Simić 3'; Milošević 64'

Ness Ziona Stadium, Ness Ziona
Attendance: 383
Referee: Andrei Chivulete (Romania)
26 May 2022
20:00

Spain	1–2	Portugal
Boñar 17'	Report	Moreira 9'; Rodrigues 63'

Netanya Stadium, Netanya
Attendance: 656
Referee: Christian-Petru Ciochirca (Austria)

=== Semi-finals ===
The semi-finals took place on 29 May.

29 May 2022
17:30

France	2–2	Portugal
Zaïre-Emery 8'; Muniz 45+1' (o.g.)	Report	Moreira 12'; Essugo 20'
Penalties
Gueguin (penalty scored); Diallo (penalty scored); Kabamba (penalty scored); Byar (penalty scored); Tel (penalty scored); Bitshiabu (penalty scored)	6–5	(penalty scored) Gonçalves; (penalty scored) Muniz; (penalty scored) Rodrigues; (penalty scored) Essugo; (penalty scored) Djaló; (penalty missed) Mendonça

Netanya Stadium, Netanya
Attendance: 1,165
Referee: Dario Bel (Croatia)
29 May 2022
21:00

Netherlands	2–2	Serbia
Van Duiven 47'; Slory 73'	Report	Milošević 50'; Mijatović 55'
Penalties
Huijsen (penalty scored); Van den Heuvel (penalty scored); Agougil (penalty scored); Kleijn (penalty scored); Babadi (penalty scored)	5–3	(penalty scored) Stanković; (penalty missed) Radonjić; (penalty scored) Šljivić; (penalty scored) Serafimović

Netanya Stadium, Netanya
Attendance: 320
Referee: Henrik Nalbandyan (Armenia)

=== Final ===
The final took place on 1 June.

1 June 2022
19:00

France	2–1	Netherlands
Kumbedi 58', 60'	Report	Slory 48'

Netanya Stadium, Netanya
Attendance: 6,725
Referee: Christian-Petru Ciochirca (Austria)

== Goalscorers ==
There were 101 goals scored in 31 matches, for an average of 3.26 goals per match.

5 goals

- (Serbia) Jovan Milošević

4 goals

- (Portugal) Afonso Moreira
- (Sweden) Jardell Kanga

3 goals

- (France) Mathys Tel
- (Germany) Nelson Weiper
- (Netherlands) Jason van Duiven
- (Portugal) João Veloso

2 goals

- (Belgium) Stanis Idumbo-Muzambo
- (France) Zoumana Diallo
- (France) Désiré Doué
- (France) Saël Kumbedi
- (France) Warren Zaïre-Emery
- (Germany) Sidney Raebiger
- (Israel) Yan Yusopove
- (Netherlands) Yoram Boerhout
- (Netherlands) Dean Huijsen
- (Netherlands) Gabriel Misehouy
- (Netherlands) Jaden Slory
- (Portugal) Ivan Lima
- (Portugal) Rodrigo Ribeiro
- (Portugal) José Rodrigues
- (Spain) Javier Boñar
- (Spain) Iker Bravo
- (Turkey) Can Uzun

1 goal

- (Belgium) Jorne Spileers
- (Belgium) Chemsdine Talbi
- (Bulgaria) Martin Georgiev
- (Bulgaria) Stefan Traykov
- (Denmark) Elias Hansborg-Sørensen
- (Denmark) Emil Højlund
- (Denmark) Markus Jensen
- (Denmark) Noah Nartey
- (Denmark) Noah Sahsah
- (Denmark) Alexander Simmelhack
- (France) Ayman Aiki
- (France) Naïm Byar
- (France) Axel Gueguin
- (France) Tom Saettel
- (Germany) Tom Bischof
- (Germany) Arijon Ibrahimović
- (Germany) Dženan Pejčinović
- (Germany) Laurin Ulrich
- (Germany) Paul Wanner
- (Israel) Karem Zoabi
- (Italy) Alessandro Bolzan
- (Italy) Kevin Bruno
- (Italy) Luca Di Maggio
- (Italy) Luca Lipani
- (Italy) Francesco Pio Esposito
- (Netherlands) Isaac Babadi
- (Netherlands) Antoni Milambo
- (Poland) Dawid Drachal
- (Poland) Tommaso Guercio
- (Poland) Oliwier Sławiński
- (Portugal) Dário Essugo
- (Scotland) Magnus Mackenzie
- (Scotland) Rory Wilson
- (Serbia) Jovan Mijatović
- (Serbia) Jan-Carlo Simić
- (Serbia) Jovan Šljivić
- (Spain) David Mella
- (Spain) Dani Rodríguez
- (Sweden) Leonardo de Oliveira

1 own goal

- (Portugal) Luis Gomes (against Denmark)
- (Portugal) João Muniz (against France)
- (Scotland) Magnus Mackenzie (against Denmark)

Source: UEFA
