= Albania national under-18 football team =

National U-18 association football team

Albania Under-18
- Nickname(s): Kuqezinjtë (The Red and Blacks); Shqiponjat (The Eagles)
- Association: Federata Shqiptare e Futbollit (FSHF)
- Confederation: UEFA
- Most caps: Artur Lekbello (8); Sokol Kushta (8)
- Top scorer: Sokol Kushta (6)
- Home stadium: Elbasan Arena; Loro Boriçi Stadium
- FIFA code: ALB
First colours	Second colours	Third colours

First international
- Albania 4–0 Cyprus (Tirana, Albania; 10 March 1982)

Biggest win
- Albania 4–0 Cyprus (Tirana, Albania; 10 March 1982)

Biggest defeat
- Slovakia 4–0 Albania (Nymburk, Czech Republic; 16 October 1997)

UEFA European Under-18 Championship
- Appearances: 1 (first in 1982)
- Best result: Group stage

The Albania national under-18 football team represents Albania in international football at this age level and is controlled by Albanian Football Association, the governing body for football in Albania.

The Albania U18 football team is a feeder team of Albania U19.

The team competed in the UEFA European Under-18 Football Championship, but after the rule change in the 2000s, the event had an age limit of 19.

== History ==
=== 1982 UEFA European Under-18 Championship ===
==== First round ====
Team 1	Agg.	Team 2	1st leg	2nd leg
Albania; Demollari 12' 14'; Zacharias (o.g.); Kushta 75'	4–2	Cyprus	4–0	0–2

==== Second round - Group D ====
Teams	Pld	W	D	L	GF	GA	GD	Pts
Scotland	3	2	1	0	6	1	+5	5
Netherlands	3	2	1	0	7	3	+4	5
Turkey	3	0	1	2	2	6	–4	1
Albania	3	0	1	2	2	7	–5	1

21 May	Scotland	3–0	Albania
23 May	Netherlands	3–1	Albania
25 May	Turkey	1–1	Albania

==== Squad ====
COACH: (Albania) Bahri Ishka

The following players participated in the tournament.

No.	Pos.	Player	Date of birth (age)	Caps	Goals	Club
	GK	Halim Mersini	22 September 1961 (aged 20)	3	0	(Albanian Football Federation) Shkëndija Tiranë
	DF	Hysen Zmijani	29 April 1963 (aged 19)	3	0	(Albanian Football Federation) Vllaznia Shkodër
	DF	Adnan Oçelli	6 August 1963 (aged 18)	3	0	(Albanian Football Federation) Partizani Tirana
	DF	Skënder Gega	14 November 1963 (aged 18)	2	0	(Albanian Football Federation) Partizani Tirana
	DF	Josif Gjergji	13 April 1965 (aged 17)	1	0	(Albanian Football Federation) Dinamo Tirana
	DF	Koshta		1	0	
	MF	Sulejman Demollari	15 May 1964 (aged 18)	3	0	(Albanian Football Federation) Dinamo Tirana
	MF	Mirel Josa	1 June 1963 (aged 18)	3	1	(Albanian Football Federation) Tirana
	MF	Artur Lekbello	23 February 1966 (aged 16)	3	0	(Albanian Football Federation) Tirana
	MF	Eduard Zhupa	4 August 1964 (aged 17)	3	0	(Albanian Football Federation) Shkëndija Tiranë
	MF	Isak Pashaj	25 March 1964 (aged 18)	2	0	(Albanian Football Federation) Vllaznia Shkodër
	FW	Sokol Kushta	17 April 1964 (aged 18)	3	1	(Albanian Football Federation) Flamurtari Vlorë
	FW	Gilbert Rrapo		3	0	(Albanian Football Federation) Skënderbeu Korçë
	FW	Safedin Raxhimi		2	0	(Albanian Football Federation) Dinamo Tirana
	FW	Edi Barci	18	1	0	Dinamo

=== 1983 UEFA European Under-18 Championship ===
==== First round ====
Team 1	Agg.	Team 2	1st leg	2nd leg
Bulgaria	4–1	Albania	4–0	0–1

==== Squad ====
COACH: (Albania) Resul Ahmeti

The following players participated in the tournament.

No.	Pos.	Player	Date of birth (age)	Caps	Goals	Club
	GK	Ilir Bozhiqi	22 May 1965 (aged 17)	1	0	(Albanian Football Federation) Dinamo Tirana
	GK	Muharrem Dosti	28 January 1964 (aged 19)	1	0	(Albanian Football Federation) Elbasani
	DF	Josif Gjergji	13 April 1965 (aged 17)	2	0	(Albanian Football Federation) Dinamo Tirana
	DF	Bilbili		2	0	
	DF	Germenji		2	0	
	DF	Shyqry Shala	5 July 1965 (aged 17)	1	0	(Albanian Football Federation) Besa Kavajë
	MF	Artur Lekbello	23 February 1966 (aged 17)	2	0	(Albanian Football Federation) Tirana
	MF	Viktor Briza	4 May 1962 (aged 20)	2	0	(Albanian Football Federation) Vllaznia Shkodër
	MF	Abdyl Kuriu		2	0	(Albanian Football Federation) Besa Kavajë
	MF	Xhema		2	0	
	MF	A. Muça		1	0	
	MF	Ramolli		1	0	
	FW	Sokol Kushta	17 April 1964 (aged 18)	2	1	(Albanian Football Federation) Flamurtari Vlorë
	FW	Gilbert Rrapo		2	0	(Albanian Football Federation) Skënderbeu Korçë
	FW	Faslli Fakja		2	0	(Albanian Football Federation) Vllaznia Shkodër

=== Triple friendly match against Turkey in 1983 ===
Between 10 and 14 August 1983 Albania U18 played 3 friendly matches against Turkey U18 winning the first one 3–0, losing 3–1 the second game and taking a goalless draw in the last match. Sokol Kushta scored 3 goals between these matches.

=== 1988 UEFA European Under-18 Championship ===
==== Group 7 ====
Teams	Pld	W	D	L	GF	GA	GD	Pts
Netherlands	6	2	3	1	5	3	+2	7
Bulgaria	6	3	1	2	11	10	+1	7
Hungary	6	2	1	3	11	7	+4	5
Albania	6	2	1	3	3	10	–7	5

Albania	1–1	Netherlands
Albania	1–0	Hungary
Bulgaria	4–0	Albania
Albania	1–0	Bulgaria
Netherlands	2–0	Albania
Hungary	3–0	Albania

==== Squad ====
COACH: (Albania)

The following players participated in the tournament.

No.	Pos.	Player	Date of birth (age)	Caps	Goals	Club
	GK		1 January 1969 (aged 18)	0	0	(Albanian Football Federation)
	DF		1 January 1969 (aged 18)	0	0	(Albanian Football Federation)
	MF		1 January 1969 (aged 18)	0	0	(Albanian Football Federation)
	FW		1 January 1969 (aged 18)	0	0	(Albanian Football Federation)

=== 1990 UEFA European Under-18 Championship ===
==== Group 4 ====
Teams	Pld	W	D	L	GF	GA	GD	Pts
Portugal	6	5	1	0	11	1	+10	11
Italy	6	4	1	1	10	3	+7	9
Albania	6	1	0	5	6	8	–2	2
Switzerland	6	1	0	5	1	16	–15	2

Albania	4–0	Switzerland
Portugal	2–1	Albania
Albania	1–2	Italy
Albania	0–2	Portugal
Italy	1–0	Albania
Switzerland	1–0	Albania

==== Squad ====
COACH: (Albania)

The following players participated in the tournament.

No.	Pos.	Player	Date of birth (age)	Caps	Goals	Club
	GK		1 January 1971 (aged 18)	0	0	(Albanian Football Federation)
	DF		1 January 1971 (aged 18)	0	0	(Albanian Football Federation)
	MF		1 January 1971 (aged 18)	0	0	(Albanian Football Federation)
	FW		1 January 1971 (aged 18)	0	0	(Albanian Football Federation)

=== 1993 UEFA European Under-18 Championship ===
Team 1	Agg.	Team 2	1st leg	2nd leg
Albania (o.g.)	1–7	Spain	0–4	1–3

==== Squad ====
COACH: (Albania)

The following players participated in the tournament.

No.	Pos.	Player	Date of birth (age)	Caps	Goals	Club
	GK		1 January 1971 (aged 18)	0	0	(Albanian Football Federation)
	DF		1 January 1971 (aged 18)	0	0	(Albanian Football Federation)
	MF		1 January 1971 (aged 18)	0	0	(Albanian Football Federation)
	FW		1 January 1971 (aged 18)	0	0	(Albanian Football Federation)

=== 1997 UEFA European Under-18 Championship qualifying ===
==== Group 10 ====
All matches were played in Spain.

Teams	Pld	W	D	L	GF	GA	GD	Pts
Spain	2	2	0	0	6	1	+5	6
Slovenia	2	0	1	1	0	2	–2	1
Albania	2	0	1	1	1	4	–3	1

Albania	0–0	Slovenia
Spain	4–1	Albania

==== Squad ====
COACH: (Albania) Bujar Kasmi

The following players participated in the tournament.

No.	Pos.	Player	Date of birth (age)	Caps	Goals	Club
1	GK	Ilion Lika	17 May 1980 (aged 16)	2	0	(Albanian Football Federation) Dinamo Tirana
12	GK	Florjan Kasmi	11 November 1978 (aged 17)	0	0	
2	DF	Elvis Sina (Captain)	14 November 1978 (aged 17)	2	0	(Albanian Football Federation) Tirana
14	DF	Ervin Bardhi	19 September 1979 (aged 17)	2	0	(Albanian Football Federation) Besa Kavajë
8	DF	Xhimi Buna	3 October 1978 (aged 18)	2	0	
13	DF	Stavrion Lako	24 March 1980 (aged 16)	1	0	(Albanian Football Federation) Skënderbeu Korçë
4	DF	Elton Lilaj	9 October 1978 (aged 18)	1	0	
3	MF	Bledar Çerri	21 September 1979 (aged 17)	2	1	
6	MF	Habib Rexhepi	12 April 1979 (aged 17)	2	0	(Albanian Football Federation) Teuta Durrës
9	MF	Admir Shehaj	26 August 1978 (aged 18)	2	0	
5	MF	Fatjon Malaj	17 April 1979 (aged 17)	2	0	
11	MF	Gentjan Brahimaj	15 August 1979 (aged 17)	2	0	
16	MF	Gentjan Mezani	13 October 1979 (aged 17)	1	0	
7	FW	Klodian Arbëri	10 October 1979 (aged 17)	2	0	(Albanian Football Federation) Tomori Berat
10	FW	Ligor Tiko	12 August 1979 (aged 17)	2	0	(Albanian Football Federation) Partizani Tirana
15	FW	Kliton Cafi	3 June 1979 (aged 17)	2	0	(Albanian Football Federation) Besëlidhja Lezhë

=== 1998 UEFA European Under-18 Championship qualifying ===
==== Group 2 ====
All matches were played in the Czech Republic.

Teams	Pld	W	D	L	GF	GA	GD	Pts
Armenia	3	2	1	0	9	4	+5	7
Slovakia	3	1	2	0	11	6	+5	5
Czech Republic	3	1	1	1	8	8	0	4
Albania	3	0	0	3	3	13	–10	0

Armenia	4–0	Albania
Slovakia	7–2	Albania
Czech Republic	2–1	Albania

==== Squad ====
COACH: (Albania) Bujar Kasmi

The following players participated in the tournament.

No.	Pos.	Player	Date of birth (age)	Caps	Goals	Club
12	GK	Arjon Mustafa	29 January 1980 (aged 17)	2	0	(Albanian Football Federation) Vllaznia Shkodër
1	GK	Ilion Lika	17 May 1980 (aged 17)	1	0	(Albanian Football Federation) Dinamo Tirana
3	DF	Rezart Dabulla	24 October 1979 (aged 17)	3	1	(Albanian Football Federation) Tirana
15	DF	Julian Ahmataj	24 May 1979 (aged 18)	3	0	(Albanian Football Federation) Elbasani
4	DF	Stavrion Lako	24 March 1980 (aged 17)	3	0	(Albanian Football Federation) Skënderbeu Korçë
13	DF	Erjon Stavri	20 April 1979 (aged 18)	3	0	
6	DF	Ervin Bardhi	19 September 1979 (aged 18)	1	0	(Albanian Football Federation) Besa Kavajë
10	MF	Habib Rexhepi	12 April 1979 (aged 18)	3	1	(Albanian Football Federation) Teuta Durrës
8	MF	Justin Bespalla	8 July 1979 (aged 18)	3	0	(Albanian Football Federation) Teuta Durrës
5	MF	Fatjon Malaj (Captain)	17 April 1979 (aged 18)	3	0	
2	MF	Bledar Çerri	21 September 1979 (aged 18)	3	0	
14	MF	Sokol Ishka	14 July 1979 (aged 18)	2	1	(Albanian Football Federation) Vllaznia Shkodër
17	MF	Gentian Gjondeda	23 June 1980 (aged 17)	2	0	(Albanian Football Federation) Dinamo Tirana
7	FW	Klodian Arbëri	10 October 1979 (aged 17)	3	0	(Albanian Football Federation) Tomori Berat
11	FW	Erjon Rizvanolli	14 August 1981 (aged 16)	3	0	(Albanian Football Federation) Tirana
9	FW	Ramiz Kollcaku	6 September 1980 (aged 17)	3	0	(Albanian Football Federation) Besa Kavajë

=== 1999 UEFA European Under-18 Championship qualifying ===
==== Group 6 ====
All matches were played in Italy.

Teams	Pld	W	D	L	GF	GA	GD	Pts
Italy	3	3	0	0	7	0	+7	9
Liechtenstein	3	2	0	1	2	1	+1	6
Albania	3	0	1	2	2	5	–3	1
North Macedonia	3	0	1	2	2	7	–5	1

Albania	0–1	Liechtenstein
Albania	2–2	North Macedonia
Italy	2–0	Albania

==== Squad ====
COACH: (Albania) Bujar Kasmi

The following players participated in the tournament.

No.	Pos.	Player	Date of birth (age)	Caps	Goals	Club
12	GK	Arjon Mustafa	29 January 1980 (aged 18)	3	0	(Albanian Football Federation) Vllaznia Shkodër
1	GK	Isli Hidi	15 October 1980 (aged 18)	0	0	(Albanian Football Federation) Tirana
14	DF	Stavrion Lako (Captain)	24 March 1980 (aged 18)	3	0	(Albanian Football Federation) Skënderbeu Korçë
9	DF	Julian Kapaj	26 April 1981 (aged 17)	3	0	(Albanian Football Federation) Tirana
2	DF	Artur Abdullai	3 March 1981 (aged 17)	3	0	
17	DF	Kreshnik Mance	5 January 1980 (aged 18)	3	0	(Albanian Football Federation) Teuta Durrës
8	DF	Dritan Mehmeti	9 January 1980 (aged 18)	2	0	(Albanian Football Federation) Dinamo Tirana
7	DF	Gjergji Gjika	4 February 1980 (aged 18)	0	0	(Albanian Football Federation) Elbasani
4	MF	Dritan Babamusta	6 September 1981 (aged 17)	3	0	(Albanian Football Federation) Teuta Durrës
13	MF	Ervin Bulku	3 March 1981 (aged 17)	3	0	(Albanian Football Federation) Tirana
10	MF	Dorian Bylykbashi	8 August 1980 (aged 18)	3	1	(Albanian Football Federation) Elbasani
5	MF	Gentian Gjondeda	23 June 1980 (aged 18)	3	1	(Albanian Football Federation) Dinamo Tirana
18	MF	Taulant Çerçizi	26 March 1981 (aged 17)	2	0	(Albanian Football Federation) Flamurtari Vlorë
11	MF	Endri Yzeiri	6 September 1980 (aged 18)	1	0	(Albanian Football Federation) Erzeni
3	FW	Ramiz Kollcaku	6 September 1980 (aged 18)	3	0	(Albanian Football Federation) Besa Kavajë
6	FW	Erjon Rizvanolli	14 August 1981 (aged 17)	1	0	(Albanian Football Federation) Tirana
15	FW	Andi Shtrepi	21 May 1980 (aged 18)	1	0	(Albanian Football Federation) Erzeni
16	FW	Julian Zëri	25 April 1980 (aged 18)	0	0	

=== 2000 UEFA European Under-18 Championship qualifying ===
==== Group 6 ====
All matches were played in Finland.

Teams	Pld	W	D	L	GF	GA	GD	Pts
Finland	3	3	0	0	7	3	+4	9
Hungary	3	2	0	1	9	5	+4	6
Albania	3	1	0	2	4	5	–1	3
Faroe Islands	3	0	0	3	3	10	–7	0

Albania	3–1	Faroe Islands
Finland	2–1	Albania
Hungary	2–0	Albania

==== Squad ====
COACH: (Albania) Petrit Haxhia

The following players participated in the tournament.

No.	Pos.	Player	Date of birth (age)	Caps	Goals	Club
12	GK	Gasper Ndoja	15 April 1981 (aged 18)	2	0	(Albanian Football Federation) Vllaznia Shkodër
1	GK	Erjon Dine	10 April 1981 (aged 18)	1	0	(Albanian Football Federation) Flamurtari Vlorë
5	DF	Amarildo Belisha	11 July 1981 (aged 18)	3	0	(Albanian Football Federation) Vllaznia Shkodër
7	DF	Arjan Sheta	13 February 1981 (aged 18)	3	0	(Albanian Football Federation) Partizani Tirana
3	DF	Julian Kapaj	26 April 1981 (aged 18)	3	0	(Albanian Football Federation) Tirana
17	DF	Sokol Toma	17 February 1981 (aged 18)	3	0	(Albanian Football Federation) Besëlidhja Lezhë
8	DF	Elton Dalipaj	27 October 1981 (aged 17)	3	0	(Albanian Football Federation) Elbasani
18	DF	Ermal Lamaj (Vasiljevsk Lamaj)	20 March 1983 (aged 16)	1	0	(Albanian Football Federation) Teuta Durrës
2	MF	Ervin Bulku	3 March 1981 (aged 18)	3	1	(Albanian Football Federation) Tirana
4	MF	Taulant Çerçizi	26 March 1981 (aged 18)	3	0	(Albanian Football Federation) Flamurtari Vlorë
9	MF	Albert Kaçi	11 June 1981 (aged 18)	3	0	(Albanian Football Federation) Vllaznia Shkodër
6	MF	Dritan Babamusta	6 September 1981 (aged 17)	3	1	(Albanian Football Federation) Teuta Durrës
16	MF	Gledis Shkrela	4 March 1981 (aged 18)	2	0	
15	MF	Fatjon Leka	5 February 1981 (aged 18)	1	0	
13	MF	Erind Kosova	30 April 1982 (aged 17)	0	0	
11	FW	Erjon Rizvanolli (Captain)	14 August 1981 (aged 18)	3	2	(Albanian Football Federation) Tirana
10	FW	Oert Kote	9 January 1981 (aged 18)	3	0	(Albanian Football Federation) Teuta Durrës
14	FW	Klevi Lluka	15 May 1981 (aged 18)	2	0	

=== 2001 UEFA European Under-18 Championship qualifying ===
==== Group 4 ====
All matches were played in Turkey.

Teams	Pld	W	D	L	GF	GA	GD	Pts
Israel	3	3	0	0	8	1	+7	9
Turkey	3	2	0	1	12	1	+11	6
Albania	3	1	0	2	2	7	–5	3
San Marino	3	0	0	3	0	13	–13	0

Albania	1–0	San Marino
Turkey	4–0	Albania
Albania	1–3	Israel

==== Squad ====
COACH: (Albania) Petrit Haxhia

The following players participated in the tournament.

No.	Pos.	Player	Date of birth (age)	Caps	Goals	Club
1	GK	Ervis Agolli	15 August 1982 (aged 18)	3	0	(Albanian Football Federation) Partizani Tiranë
12	GK	Eraldi Gjondedaj	4 April 1983 (aged 17)	0	0	
5	DF	Henri Ndreka	27 March 1983 (aged 17)	3	0	(Albanian Football Federation) Partizani Tiranë
13	DF	Rigels Gjoni	11 March 1983 (aged 17)	2	0	(Albanian Football Federation) Flamurtari Vlorë
14	DF	Robert Grishaj	10 March 1982 (aged 18)	3	0	(Albanian Football Federation) Besëlidhja Lezhë
17	DF	Mardjan Kacollja	29 May 1983 (aged 17)	1	0	(Albanian Football Federation) Elbasani
8	DF	Renaldo Tabaku (Captain)	3 September 1982 (aged 18)	3	0	(Albanian Football Federation) Tomori Berat
3	DF	Fatjon Tafaj	19 March 1982 (aged 18)	3	0	(Albanian Football Federation) Partizani Tiranë
6	MF	Endrit Agushi	24 September 1982 (aged 18)	3	0	(Albanian Football Federation) Erzeni Shijak
11	MF	Edmond Kapllani	31 July 1982 (aged 18)	2	0	(Albanian Football Federation) Teuta Durrës
7	MF	Endrit Vrapi	23 March 1982 (aged 18)	2	0	(Albanian Football Federation) Partizani Tiranë
15	MF	Vasjan Ballco	6 January 1982 (aged 18)	1	0	(Albanian Football Federation) Skënderbeu Korçë
16	MF	Erald Deliallisi	12 March 1982 (aged 18)	3	0	(Albanian Football Federation) Lushnja
2	MF	Edmond Lala	21 October 1983 (aged 17)	3	0	(Albanian Football Federation) Tomori Berat
18	MF	Gentjan Kau	10 July 1982 (aged 18)	0	0	
4	FW	Roland Dervishi	16 February 1982 (aged 18)	3	0	(Albanian Football Federation) Shkumbini Peqin
9	FW	Bekim Kuli	19 September 1982 (aged 18)	3	2	(Albanian Football Federation) Besa Kavajë
10	FW	Bledar Mançaku	5 January 1982 (aged 18)	3	0	(Albanian Football Federation) Teuta Durrës

== Current squad ==
The following players were named in the last squad for the friendly match against Italy on 19 May 2011 (When they last played a match).

No.	Pos.	Player	Date of birth (age)	Caps	Goals	Club
	GK	Arianit Lazraj	28 March 1993 (aged 18)	1	0	(Swiss Football Association) St. Gallen
	GK	Mikel Kaloshi (Played for the U19s)	16 June 1993 (aged 17)	1	0	(Albanian Football Federation) Lushnja
	DF	Shkodran Nuredini (Played for the U21s)	21 February 1993 (aged 18)	2	0	(Swiss Football Association) Zürich
	DF	Altin Abazaj (Played for the U19s)	18 August 1993 (aged 17)	1	0	(Albanian Football Federation) Teuta Durres
	DF	Harallamb Qaqi (Played for U19 & U21s)	17 September 1993 (aged 17)	2	0	(Hellenic Football Federation) AEK Athens
	DF	Mërgim Bajraktari (Played for U19 & U21s)	27 May 1993 (aged 17)	2	0	(Swiss Football Association) Thun
	DF	Bruno Dita (Played for U19 & U21s)	18 February 1993 (aged 18)	2	0	(Albanian Football Federation) Dinamo Tirana
	MF	Dorian Kërçiku (Played for the U21s)	30 August 1993 (aged 17)	2	0	(Albanian Football Federation) Tirana
	MF	Teki Premci	23 March 1993 (aged 18)	2	0	Unattached
	MF	Mateos Toçi (Played for the U19s)	16 May 1993 (aged 18)	2	0	(Albanian Football Federation) Elbasani
	MF	Alfred Deliallisi (Played for U19 & U21s)	28 March 1993 (aged 18)	1	0	(Albanian Football Federation) Teuta Durres
	MF	Bekim Dema (Played for U19 & U21s)	30 March 1993 (aged 18)	2	0	(Albanian Football Federation) Vllaznia Shkoder
	MF	Amir Tafa (Played for the U19s)	3 March 1993 (aged 18)	2	1	(Albanian Football Federation) Vllaznia Shkodër
	FW	Arbër Çyrbja (Played for the U21s)	18 September 1993 (aged 17)	2	0	(Albanian Football Federation) Teuta Durrës
	FW	Sindrit Guri (Played for U19 & U21s)	23 October 1993 (aged 17)	2	0	(Albanian Football Federation) Vllaznia Shkoder
	FW	Fabio Hoxha (Played for U19 & U21s)	7 May 1993 (aged 18)	2	0	(Italian Football Federation) Inter
	FW	Mateo Hasa (Played for U19 & U21s)	23 May 1993 (aged 17)	1	0	(Albanian Football Federation) Besa Kavaje
	FW	Enio Petro (Played for U19 & U21s)	1 August 1993 (aged 17)	1	0	(Albanian Football Federation) Teuta Durrës

Players in italics have played internationally at a higher level.

== Competitive record ==
=== UEFA Youth Tournament Under-18 Record ===
Year	Round	GP	W	D*	L	GS	GA
(Italy) 1955	Did Not Participate						
(Hungary) 1956	Did Not Participate						
(Luxembourg) 1958	Did Not Participate						
(Bulgaria) 1959	Did Not Participate						
(Austria) 1960	Did Not Participate						
(Portugal) 1961	Did Not Participate						
(Romania) 1962	Did Not Participate						
(England) 1963	Did Not Participate						
(Netherlands) 1964	Did Not Participate						
(West Germany) 1965	Did Not Participate						
(Socialist Federal Republic of Yugoslavia) 1966	Did Not Participate						
(Turkey) 1967	Qualifying round	w.o. vs. Yugoslavia					
(France) 1968	Did Not Participate						
(East Germany) 1969	Qualifying round	DSQ vs. Bulgaria					
(Scotland) 1970	Did Not Participate						
(Czechoslovakia) 1971	Did Not Participate						
(Spain) 1972	Did Not Participate						
(Italy) 1973	Did Not Participate						
(Sweden) 1974	Did Not Participate						
(Switzerland) 1975	Did Not Participate						
(Hungary) 1976	Did Not Participate						
(Belgium) 1977	Did Not Participate						
(Poland) 1978	Did Not Participate						
(Austria) 1979	Did Not Participate						
(East Germany) 1980	Did Not Participate						
Total	0/25	0	0	0	0	0	0

=== UEFA European Under-18 Championship Record ===
Year	Round	GP	W	D*	L	GS	GA
(West Germany) 1981	Did Not Participate						
(Finland) 1982	Groupstage	5	1	1	3	6	9
(England) 1983	First round	2	1	0	1	1	4
(Soviet Union) 1984	Did Not Participate						
(Socialist Federal Republic of Yugoslavia) 1986	Did Not Participate						
(Czechoslovakia) 1988	First round	6	2	1	3	3	10
(Hungary) 1990	First round	6	1	0	5	6	8
(Germany) 1992	Did Not Participate						
(England) 1993	First round	2	0	0	2	1	7
(Spain) 1994	Did Not Participate						
(Greece) 1995	Did Not Participate						
(France) (Luxembourg) 1996	Did Not Participate						
(Iceland) 1997	Round 1	2	0	1	1	1	4
(Cyprus) 1998	Round 1	3	0	0	3	3	13
(Sweden) 1999	Round 1	3	0	1	2	2	5
(Germany) 2000	Round 1	3	1	0	2	4	5
(Finland) 2001	Round 1	3	1	0	2	2	7
Total	1/10	35	7	4	24	29	72

*Denotes draws include knockout matches decided on penalty kicks.

== See also ==
- Albania national football team
- Albania national under-23 football team
- Albania national under-21 football team
- Albania national under-20 football team
- Albania national under-19 football team
- Albania national under-17 football team
- Albania national under-16 football team
- Albania national under-15 football team
- Albania national football team results
- Albania national youth football team
- Albanian Superliga
- Football in Albania
- List of Albania international footballers
