= 2000 UEFA European Under-18 Championship qualifying =

Football tournament qualification stage

This article features the 2000 UEFA European Under-18 Championship qualifying stage. Matches were played 1999 through 2000. Two qualifying rounds were organised and seven teams qualified for the main tournament, joining host Germany.

== Round 1 ==
=== Group 1 ===
All matches were played in Romania.

Teams	Pld	W	D	L	GF	GA	GD	Pts
Ukraine	3	1	2	0	5	1	+4	5
Romania	3	1	2	0	5	3	+2	5
Bosnia and Herzegovina	3	1	1	1	4	4	0	4
Bulgaria	3	0	1	2	2	8	–6	1

Bulgaria	0–4	Ukraine
Romania	3–1	Bosnia and Herzegovina
Bosnia and Herzegovina	1–1	Ukraine
Romania	2–2	Bulgaria
Bosnia and Herzegovina	2–0	Bulgaria
Ukraine	0–0	Romania

=== Group 2 ===
All matches were played in Sweden.

Teams	Pld	W	D	L	GF	GA	GD	Pts
Northern Ireland	3	3	0	0	10	2	+8	9
Sweden	3	1	1	1	7	5	+2	4
Estonia	3	1	0	2	3	8	–5	3
Luxembourg	3	0	1	2	1	6	–5	1

Estonia	1–0	Luxembourg
Sweden	1–3	Northern Ireland
Northern Ireland	4–0	Luxembourg
Sweden	5–1	Estonia
Luxembourg	1–1	Sweden
Northern Ireland	3–1	Estonia

=== Group 3 ===
All matches were played in England.

Teams	Pld	W	D	L	GF	GA	GD	Pts
Spain	3	3	0	0	10	0	+10	9
England	3	2	0	1	12	2	+10	6
Cyprus	3	1	0	2	3	5	–2	3
San Marino	3	0	0	3	0	18	–18	0

San Marino	0–3	Cyprus
Spain	2–0	England
Spain	6–0	San Marino
England	3–0	Cyprus
Cyprus	0–2	Spain
England	9–0	San Marino

=== Group 4 ===
All matches were played in Belgium.

Teams	Pld	W	D	L	GF	GA	GD	Pts
Russia	3	2	0	1	5	5	0	6
Belgium	3	2	0	1	4	2	+2	6
Belarus	3	1	0	2	7	8	–1	3
FR Yugoslavia	3	1	0	2	6	7	–1	3

Russia	2–4	Belarus
FR Yugoslavia	1–2	Belgium
Russia	2–1	FR Yugoslavia
Belarus	0–2	Belgium
Belarus	3–4	FR Yugoslavia
Belgium	0–1	Russia

=== Group 5 ===
All matches were played in Portugal.

Teams	Pld	W	D	L	GF	GA	GD	Pts
Slovakia	3	2	1	0	9	1	+8	7
Portugal	3	2	1	0	6	2	+4	7
Slovenia	3	0	1	2	1	3	–2	1
Moldova	3	0	1	2	2	12	–10	1

Moldova	0–7	Slovakia
Portugal	1–0	Slovenia
Portugal	4–1	Moldova
Slovenia	0–1	Slovakia
Slovakia	1–1	Portugal
Slovenia	1–1	Moldova

=== Group 6 ===
All matches were played in Finland.

Teams	Pld	W	D	L	GF	GA	GD	Pts
Finland	3	3	0	0	7	3	+4	9
Hungary	3	2	0	1	9	5	+4	6
Albania	3	1	0	2	4	5	–1	3
Faroe Islands	3	0	0	3	3	10	–7	0

Albania	3–1	Faroe Islands
Finland	3–2	Hungary
Hungary	5–2	Faroe Islands
Finland	2–1	Albania
Faroe Islands	0–2	Finland
Hungary	2–0	Albania

=== Group 7 ===
All matches were played in Denmark.

Teams	Pld	W	D	L	GF	GA	GD	Pts
Czech Republic	3	3	0	0	10	0	+10	9
Denmark	3	2	0	1	12	3	+9	6
Lithuania	3	1	0	2	3	9	–6	3
Latvia	3	0	0	3	1	14	–13	0

Lithuania	2–1	Latvia
Denmark	0–2	Czech Republic
Czech Republic	5–0	Latvia
Denmark	5–1	Lithuania
Czech Republic	3–0	Lithuania
Latvia	0–7	Denmark

=== Group 8 ===
All matches were played in Wales.

Teams	Pld	W	D	L	GF	GA	GD	Pts
Italy	3	2	1	0	7	3	+4	7
Switzerland	3	2	1	0	5	1	+4	7
Wales	3	1	0	2	5	7	–2	3
Georgia	3	0	0	3	3	9	–6	0

Georgia	1–3	Wales
Italy	0–0	Switzerland
Italy	2–1	Georgia
Switzerland	1–0	Wales
Switzerland	4–1	Georgia
Wales	2–5	Italy

=== Group 9 ===
All matches were played in Andorra.

Teams	Pld	W	D	L	GF	GA	GD	Pts
Austria	2	1	1	0	14	3	+11	4
Greece	2	1	1	0	12	3	+9	4
Andorra	2	0	0	2	0	20	–20	0

Greece	3–3	Austria
Andorra	0–9	Greece
Austria	11–0	Andorra

=== Group 10 ===
All matches were played in Croatia.

Teams	Pld	W	D	L	GF	GA	GD	Pts
Croatia	2	2	0	0	6	0	+6	6
Iceland	2	0	1	1	0	2	–2	1
North Macedonia	2	0	1	1	0	4	–4	1

Croatia	2–0	Iceland
Iceland	0–0	North Macedonia
North Macedonia	0–4	Croatia

=== Group 11 ===
All matches were played in Norway.

Teams	Pld	W	D	L	GF	GA	GD	Pts
Norway	2	2	0	0	7	3	+4	6
Turkey	2	1	0	1	6	7	–1	3
Poland	2	0	0	2	5	8	–3	0

Norway	3–2	Poland
Poland	3–5	Turkey
Turkey	1–4	Norway

=== Group 12 ===
All matches were played in Azerbaijan.

Teams	Pld	W	D	L	GF	GA	GD	Pts
Netherlands	2	1	1	0	5	3	+2	4
Israel	2	1	1	0	5	4	+1	4
Azerbaijan	2	0	0	2	1	4	–3	0

Israel	2–1	Azerbaijan
Netherlands	3–3	Israel
Azerbaijan	0–2	Netherlands

=== Group 13 ===
All matches were played in France.

Teams	Pld	W	D	L	GF	GA	GD	Pts
France	2	2	0	0	8	0	+8	6
Scotland	2	1	0	1	2	4	–2	3
Armenia	2	0	0	2	1	7	–6	0

Scotland	0–3	France
Armenia	1–2	Scotland
France	5–0	Armenia

=== Group 14 ===
All matches were played in Malta.

Teams	Pld	W	D	L	GF	GA	GD	Pts
Republic of Ireland	2	2	0	0	3	0	+3	6
Liechtenstein	2	1	0	1	2	3	–1	3
Malta	2	0	0	2	1	3	–2	0

Republic of Ireland	2–0	Liechtenstein
Malta	0–1	Republic of Ireland
Liechtenstein	2–1	Malta

== Round 2 ==
Team 1	Agg.	Team 2	1st leg	2nd leg
Ukraine	3–2	Northern Ireland	1–0	2–2
Spain	1–2	Russia	0–0	1–2
Slovakia	3–3(p: 4–5)	Finland	2–1	1–2
Czech Republic	3–1	Italy	2–1	1–0
Austria	1–4	Croatia	1–2	0–2
Norway	2–3	Netherlands	0–1	2–2
France	2–0	Republic of Ireland	0–0	2–0

== See also ==
- 2000 UEFA European Under-18 Championship
