= 1999 UEFA European Under-18 Championship qualifying =

Football tournament qualification stage

This article features the 1999 UEFA European Under-18 Championship qualifying stage. Matches were played 1998 through 1999. Two qualifying rounds were organised and seven teams qualified for the main tournament, joining host Sweden.

== Round 1 ==
=== Group 1 ===
All matches were played in Spain.

Teams	Pld	W	D	L	GF	GA	GD	Pts
Spain	3	2	1	0	12	1	+11	7
England	3	2	1	0	11	2	+9	7
Israel	3	1	0	2	3	4	–1	3
Andorra	3	0	0	3	0	19	–19	0

Israel	2–0	Andorra
Spain	1–1	England
England	8–0	Andorra
Spain	2–0	Israel
Andorra	0–9	Spain
England	2–1	Israel

=== Group 2 ===
All matches were played in Germany.

Teams	Pld	W	D	L	GF	GA	GD	Pts
Norway	3	3	0	0	14	2	+12	9
Germany	3	2	0	1	9	3	+6	6
Estonia	3	0	1	2	1	7	–6	1
Faroe Islands	3	0	1	2	1	13	–12	1

Estonia	1–1	Faroe Islands
Norway	3–2	Germany
Germany	4–0	Faroe Islands
Norway	3–0	Estonia
Germany	3–0	Estonia
Faroe Islands	0–8	Norway

=== Group 3 ===
All matches were played in Wales.

Teams	Pld	W	D	L	GF	GA	GD	Pts
Northern Ireland	3	3	0	0	7	1	+6	9
Wales	3	1	0	2	3	4	–1	3
Moldova	3	1	0	2	2	4	–2	3
Azerbaijan	3	1	0	2	1	4	–3	3

Wales	2–1	Moldova
Northern Ireland	3–0	Azerbaijan
Moldova	1–0	Azerbaijan
Wales	1–2	Northern Ireland
Azerbaijan	1–0	Wales
Moldova	0–2	Northern Ireland

=== Group 4 ===
All matches were played in Ireland.

Teams	Pld	W	D	L	GF	GA	GD	Pts
Republic of Ireland	3	2	1	0	8	3	+5	7
Russia	3	2	0	1	3	1	+2	6
Poland	3	0	2	1	3	5	–2	2
Cyprus	3	0	1	2	2	7	–5	1

Poland	0–2	Russia
Republic of Ireland	5–1	Cyprus
Russia	1–0	Cyprus
Poland	2–2	Republic of Ireland
Cyprus	1–1	Poland
Russia	0–1	Republic of Ireland

=== Group 5 ===
Teams	Pld	W	D	L	GF	GA	GD	Pts
Netherlands	6	5	0	1	17	3	+14	15
FR Yugoslavia	6	4	0	2	11	5	+6	12
Belgium	6	3	0	3	17	8	+9	9
San Marino	6	0	0	6	0	29	–29	0

FR Yugoslavia	3–0	Belgium
Netherlands	5–0	San Marino
Belgium	2–1	FR Yugoslavia
San Marino	0–5	Netherlands
San Marino	0–8	Belgium
Netherlands	0–1	FR Yugoslavia
Belgium	6–0	San Marino
Belgium	1–2	Netherlands
San Marino	0–3	FR Yugoslavia
FR Yugoslavia	2–0	San Marino
Netherlands	2–0	Belgium
FR Yugoslavia	1–3	Netherlands

=== Group 6 ===
All matches were played in Italy.

Teams	Pld	W	D	L	GF	GA	GD	Pts
Italy	3	3	0	0	7	0	+7	9
Liechtenstein	3	2	0	1	2	1	+1	6
Albania	3	0	1	2	2	5	–3	1
North Macedonia	3	0	1	2	2	7	–5	1

Albania	0–1	Liechtenstein
North Macedonia	0–4	Italy
Albania	2–2	North Macedonia
Liechtenstein	0–1	Italy
Italy	2–0	Albania
Liechtenstein	1–0	North Macedonia

=== Group 7 ===
All matches were played in Slovakia.

Teams	Pld	W	D	L	GF	GA	GD	Pts
Croatia	3	3	0	0	14	3	+11	9
Slovakia	3	1	1	1	9	6	+3	4
Finland	3	1	1	1	5	3	+2	4
Malta	3	0	0	3	0	16	–16	0

Croatia	4–3	Slovakia
Finland	3–0	Malta
Croatia	1–0	Finland
Slovakia	4–0	Malta
Malta	0–9	Croatia
Slovakia	2–2	Finland

=== Group 8 ===
All matches were played in France.

Teams	Pld	W	D	L	GF	GA	GD	Pts
France	3	3	0	0	12	0	+12	9
Belarus	3	1	1	1	4	4	0	4
Iceland	3	1	1	1	6	8	–2	4
Latvia	3	0	0	3	2	12	–10	0

Latvia	2–5	Iceland
France	3–0	Belarus
Iceland	1–1	Belarus
Latvia	0–4	France
Belarus	3–0	Latvia
Iceland	0–5	France

=== Group 9 ===
All matches were played in Portugal.

Teams	Pld	W	D	L	GF	GA	GD	Pts
Portugal	2	1	1	0	7	3	+4	4
Denmark	2	1	0	1	4	6	–2	3
Turkey	2	0	1	1	3	5	–2	1

Portugal	2–2	Turkey
Denmark	1–5	Portugal
Turkey	1–3	Denmark

=== Group 10 ===
All matches were played in Switzerland.

Teams	Pld	W	D	L	GF	GA	GD	Pts
Bosnia and Herzegovina	2	2	0	0	6	3	+3	6
Switzerland	2	1	0	1	3	3	0	3
Lithuania	2	0	0	2	3	6	–3	0

Lithuania	2–4	Bosnia and Herzegovina
Switzerland	2–1	Lithuania
Bosnia and Herzegovina	2–1	Switzerland

=== Group 11 ===
All matches were played in Ukraine.

Teams	Pld	W	D	L	GF	GA	GD	Pts
Czech Republic	2	2	0	0	4	2	+2	6
Ukraine	2	1	0	1	4	3	+1	3
Armenia	2	0	0	2	2	5	–3	0

Ukraine	3–1	Armenia
Armenia	1–2	Czech Republic
Czech Republic	2–1	Ukraine

=== Group 12 ===
All matches were played in Hungary.

Teams	Pld	W	D	L	GF	GA	GD	Pts
Georgia	2	1	1	0	2	1	+1	4
Hungary	2	0	2	0	1	1	0	2
Bulgaria	2	0	1	1	2	3	–1	1

Bulgaria	1–1	Hungary
Georgia	2–1	Bulgaria
Hungary	0–0	Georgia

=== Group 13 ===
All matches were played in Slovenia.

Teams	Pld	W	D	L	GF	GA	GD	Pts
Scotland	2	1	1	0	4	2	+2	4
Romania	2	0	2	0	2	2	0	2
Slovenia	2	0	1	1	0	2	–2	1

Romania	0–0	Slovenia
Scotland	2–2	Romania
Slovenia	0–2	Scotland

=== Group 14 ===
All matches were played in Greece.

Teams	Pld	W	D	L	GF	GA	GD	Pts
Greece	2	1	1	0	9	2	+7	4
Austria	2	1	1	0	6	2	+4	4
Luxembourg	2	0	0	2	0	11	–11	0

Luxembourg	0–4	Austria
Greece	7–0	Luxembourg
Austria	2–2	Greece

== Round 2 ==
Team 1	Agg.	Team 2	1st leg	2nd leg
Spain	(a)1–1	Norway	0–0	1–1
Northern Ireland	2–4	Republic of Ireland	1–2	1–2
Netherlands	1–1 (p: 4–5)	Italy	0–1	1–0
Croatia	2–5	France	0–4	2–1
Portugal	6–2	Bosnia and Herzegovina	2–1	4–1
Czech Republic	3–4	Georgia	2–2	1–2
Scotland	0–1	Greece	0–0	0–1

== See also ==
- 1999 UEFA European Under-18 Championship
