= 2001 UEFA European Under-18 Championship qualifying =

Football tournament qualification stage

This article features the 2001 UEFA European Under-18 Championship qualifying stage. Matches were played 2000 through 2001. Two qualifying rounds were organised and seven teams qualified for the main tournament, joining host Finland.

== Round 1 ==
=== Group 1 ===
All matches were played in Cyprus.

Teams	Pld	W	D	L	GF	GA	GD	Pts
Ukraine	3	3	0	0	6	1	+5	9
Hungary	3	1	1	1	7	4	+3	4
Belarus	3	0	2	1	2	5	–3	2
Cyprus	3	0	1	2	2	7	–5	1

Cyprus	1–2	Ukraine
Hungary	2–2	Belarus
Belarus	0–3	Ukraine
Hungary	5–1	Cyprus
Belarus	0–0	Cyprus
Ukraine	1–0	Hungary

=== Group 2 ===
All matches were played in Greece.

Teams	Pld	W	D	L	GF	GA	GD	Pts
Greece	3	3	0	0	5	0	+5	9
Romania	3	2	0	1	9	1	+8	6
Estonia	3	1	0	2	4	8	–4	3
Luxembourg	3	0	0	3	1	10	–9	0

Estonia	4–1	Luxembourg
Greece	1–0	Romania
Greece	1–0	Estonia
Romania	3–0	Luxembourg
Luxembourg	0–3	Greece
Romania	6–0	Estonia

=== Group 3 ===
All matches were played in Malta.

Teams	Pld	W	D	L	GF	GA	GD	Pts
Belgium	3	2	1	0	11	1	+10	7
Switzerland	3	2	1	0	6	2	+4	7
Liechtenstein	3	0	1	2	2	7	–5	1
Malta	3	0	1	2	1	10	–9	1

Belgium	3–0	Liechtenstein
Switzerland	2–0	Malta
Belgium	1–1	Switzerland
Liechtenstein	1–1	Malta
Liechtenstein	1–3	Switzerland
Malta	0–7	Belgium

=== Group 4 ===
All matches were played in Turkey.

Teams	Pld	W	D	L	GF	GA	GD	Pts
Israel	3	3	0	0	8	1	+7	9
Turkey	3	2	0	1	12	1	+11	6
Albania	3	1	0	2	2	7	–5	3
San Marino	3	0	0	3	0	13	–13	0

Albania	1–0	San Marino
Israel	1–0	Turkey
San Marino	0–4	Israel
Turkey	4–0	Albania
Albania	1–3	Israel
Turkey	8–0	San Marino

=== Group 5 ===
All matches were played in Italy.

Teams	Pld	W	D	L	GF	GA	GD	Pts
England	3	3	0	0	11	1	+10	9
Italy	3	2	0	1	16	2	+14	6
Faroe Islands	3	1	0	2	2	11	–9	3
Andorra	3	0	0	3	0	15	–15	0

Andorra	0–4	England
Faroe Islands	0–6	Italy
England	5–0	Faroe Islands
Italy	9–0	Andorra
England	2–1	Italy
Faroe Islands	2–0	Andorra

=== Group 6 ===
All matches were played in Poland.

Teams	Pld	W	D	L	GF	GA	GD	Pts
Poland	3	3	0	0	6	0	+6	9
Iceland	3	1	0	2	2	3	–1	3
Armenia	3	1	0	2	2	4	–2	3
Lithuania	3	1	0	2	3	6	–3	3

Armenia	0–1	Iceland
Lithuania	0–3	Poland
Armenia	2–1	Lithuania
Iceland	0–1	Poland
Iceland	1–2	Lithuania
Poland	2–0	Armenia

=== Group 7 ===
All matches were played in Austria.

Teams	Pld	W	D	L	GF	GA	GD	Pts
Austria	3	3	0	0	10	1	+9	9
Russia	3	2	0	1	15	4	+11	6
Azerbaijan	3	1	0	2	2	13	–11	3
Bosnia and Herzegovina	3	0	0	3	1	10	–9	0

Azerbaijan	0–10	Russia
Bosnia and Herzegovina	0–4	Austria
Azerbaijan	2–1	Bosnia and Herzegovina
Russia	1–4	Austria
Austria	2–0	Azerbaijan
Russia	4–0	Bosnia and Herzegovina

=== Group 8 ===
All matches were played in the Czech Republic.

Teams	Pld	W	D	L	GF	GA	GD	Pts
Czech Republic	3	3	0	0	8	0	+8	8
Republic of Ireland	3	2	0	1	5	3	+2	6
Bulgaria	3	0	1	2	3	6	–3	1
Moldova	3	0	1	2	1	8	–7	1

Moldova	1–1	Bulgaria
Republic of Ireland	0–1	Czech Republic
Bulgaria	0–2	Czech Republic
Moldova	0–2	Republic of Ireland
Bulgaria	2–3	Republic of Ireland
Czech Republic	5–0	Moldova

=== Group 9 ===
Teams	Pld	W	D	L	GF	GA	GD	Pts
Netherlands	4	3	0	1	8	5	+3	9
Germany	4	2	0	2	8	9	–1	6
France	4	1	0	3	7	9	–2	3

France	1–2	Netherlands
France	4–2	Germany
Netherlands	0–1	Germany
Germany	3–1	France
Germany	2–4	Netherlands
Netherlands	2–1	France

=== Group 10 ===
All matches were played in Slovenia.

Teams	Pld	W	D	L	GF	GA	GD	Pts
Denmark	2	2	0	0	4	2	+2	6
Macedonia	2	1	0	1	2	2	0	3
Slovenia	2	0	0	2	1	3	–2	0

Macedonia	1–0	Slovenia
Denmark	2–1	Macedonia
Slovenia	1–2	Denmark

=== Group 11 ===
All matches were played in Slovakia.

Teams	Pld	W	D	L	GF	GA	GD	Pts
Slovakia	2	2	0	0	7	0	+7	6
Wales	2	1	0	1	2	1	+1	3
Latvia	2	0	0	2	0	8	–8	0

Slovakia	1–0	Wales
Wales	2–0	Latvia
Latvia	0–6	Slovakia

=== Group 12 ===
All matches were played in Sweden.

Teams	Pld	W	D	L	GF	GA	GD	Pts
FR Yugoslavia	2	1	1	0	5	4	+1	4
Scotland	2	0	2	0	6	6	0	2
Sweden	2	0	1	1	6	7	–1	1

Sweden	4–4	Scotland
Scotland	2–2	FR Yugoslavia
FR Yugoslavia	3–2	Sweden

=== Group 13 ===
All matches were played in Croatia.

Teams	Pld	W	D	L	GF	GA	GD	Pts
Spain	2	2	0	0	5	0	+5	6
Croatia	2	1	0	1	2	3	–1	3
Georgia	2	0	0	2	0	4	–4	0

Georgia	0–2	Croatia
Spain	2–0	Georgia
Croatia	0–3	Spain

=== Group 14 ===
All matches were played in Portugal.

Teams	Pld	W	D	L	GF	GA	GD	Pts
Portugal	2	2	0	0	3	0	+3	6
Norway	2	1	0	1	3	3	0	3
Northern Ireland	2	0	0	2	1	4	–3	0

Portugal	1–0	Northern Ireland
Northern Ireland	1–3	Norway
Norway	0–2	Portugal

== Round 2 ==
Team 1	Agg.	Team 2	1st leg	2nd leg
Greece	1–2	Ukraine	1–1	0–1
Belgium	4–3	Israel	4–1	0–2
England	0–1	Poland	0–1	0–0
Austria	0–4	Czech Republic	0–2	0–2
Netherlands	3–4	Denmark	1–1	2–3
Slovakia	2–5	FR Yugoslavia	1–1	1–4
Spain	3–1	Portugal	0–0	3–1

== See also ==
- 2001 UEFA European Under-18 Championship
