= 1997 UEFA European Under-18 Championship qualifying =

Football tournament qualification stage

This article features the 1997 UEFA European Under-18 Championship qualifying stage. Matches were played 1996 through 1997. Two qualifying rounds were organised and seven teams qualified for the main tournament, joining host Iceland.

== Round 1 ==
=== Group 1 ===
All matches were played in the Netherlands.

Teams	Pld	W	D	L	GF	GA	GD	Pts
Netherlands	3	3	0	0	6	1	+5	9
Lithuania	3	1	1	1	5	5	0	4
Scotland	3	1	1	1	4	4	0	4
Wales	3	0	0	3	3	8	–5	0

Wales	0–2	Netherlands
Scotland	1–1	Lithuania
Lithuania	0–2	Netherlands
Scotland	2–1	Wales
Lithuania	4–2	Wales
Netherlands	2–1	Scotland

=== Group 2 ===
All matches were played in Sweden.

Teams	Pld	W	D	L	GF	GA	GD	Pts
France	3	2	1	0	8	1	+7	7
Sweden	3	2	1	0	7	1	+6	7
Latvia	3	1	0	2	2	7	–5	3
Faroe Islands	3	0	0	3	1	9	–8	0

France	5–0	Latvia
Faroe Islands	0–5	Sweden
Faroe Islands	0–2	France
Sweden	1–0	Latvia
Latvia	2–1	Faroe Islands
Sweden	1–1	France

=== Group 3 ===
All matches were played in Norway.

Teams	Pld	W	D	L	GF	GA	GD	Pts
Norway	2	2	0	0	5	1	+4	6
Belarus	2	1	0	1	5	2	+3	3
Estonia	2	0	0	2	0	7	–7	0

Norway	2–1	Belarus
Belarus	4–0	Estonia
Estonia	0–3	Norway

=== Group 4 ===
All matches were played in Ireland.

Teams	Pld	W	D	L	GF	GA	GD	Pts
Republic of Ireland	2	0	2	0	3	3	0	2
Denmark	2	0	2	0	3	3	0	2
Poland	2	0	2	0	2	2	0	2

Denmark	2–2	Republic of Ireland
Poland	1–1	Denmark
Republic of Ireland	1–1	Poland

=== Group 5 ===
All matches were played in England.

Teams	Pld	W	D	L	GF	GA	GD	Pts
England	2	2	0	0	5	0	+5	6
Finland	2	1	0	1	2	1	+1	3
Northern Ireland	2	0	0	2	0	6	–6	0

Finland	2–0	Northern Ireland
England	1–0	Finland
Northern Ireland	0–4	England

=== Group 6 ===
Teams	Pld	W	D	L	GF	GA	GD	Pts
Portugal	6	4	0	2	19	8	+11	12
Germany	6	4	0	2	13	12	+1	12
Turkey	6	4	0	2	12	13	–1	12
Belgium	6	0	0	6	8	19	–11	0

Turkey	5–3	Belgium
Belgium	1–2	Germany
Germany	2–4	Turkey
Portugal	4–2	Belgium
Turkey	0–2	Germany
Belgium	1–3	Portugal
Turkey	2–1	Portugal
Germany	2–1	Portugal
Belgium	0–1	Turkey
Portugal	5–1	Germany
Portugal	5–0	Turkey
Germany	4–1	Belgium

=== Group 7 ===
All matches were played in Slovakia

Teams	Pld	W	D	L	GF	GA	GD	Pts
Croatia	2	2	0	0	7	0	+7	6
Slovakia	2	1	0	1	2	4	–2	3
North Macedonia	2	0	0	2	0	5	–5	0

North Macedonia	0–2	Slovakia
Croatia	3–0	North Macedonia
Slovakia	0–4	Croatia

=== Group 8 ===
All matches were played in Switzerland.

Teams	Pld	W	D	L	GF	GA	GD	Pts
Switzerland	2	1	1	0	3	2	+1	4
Azerbaijan	2	1	0	1	1	1	0	3
Austria	2	0	1	1	2	3	–1	1

Austria	2–2	Switzerland
Azerbaijan	1–0	Austria
Switzerland	1–0	Azerbaijan

=== Group 9 ===
All matches were played in Luxembourg.

Teams	Pld	W	D	L	GF	GA	GD	Pts
Czech Republic	2	2	0	0	10	1	+9	6
Malta	2	1	0	1	3	6	–3	3
Luxembourg	2	0	0	2	1	7	–6	0

Luxembourg	0–3	Malta
Malta	0–6	Czech Republic
Czech Republic	4–1	Luxembourg

=== Group 10 ===
All matches were played in Spain.

Teams	Pld	W	D	L	GF	GA	GD	Pts
Spain	2	2	0	0	6	1	+5	6
Slovenia	2	0	1	1	0	2	–2	1
Albania	2	0	1	1	1	4	–3	1

Slovenia	0–2	Spain
Albania	0–0	Slovenia
Spain	4–1	Albania

=== Group 11 ===
All matches were played in Romania.

Teams	Pld	W	D	L	GF	GA	GD	Pts
Israel	3	3	0	0	6	3	+3	9
Romania	3	2	0	1	8	3	+5	6
Ukraine	3	1	0	2	4	5	–1	3
Moldova	3	0	0	3	2	9	–7	0

Moldova	1–2	Ukraine
Romania	1–2	Israel
Israel	2–1	Ukraine
Romania	5–0	Moldova
Israel	2–1	Moldova
Ukraine	1–2	Romania

=== Group 12 ===
Teams	Pld	W	D	L	GF	GA	GD	Pts
FR Yugoslavia	4	2	1	1	8	3	+5	7
Italy	4	1	2	1	4	3	+1	5
Greece	4	1	1	2	1	7	–6	4

Greece	0–0	Italy
FR Yugoslavia	0–1	Greece
Italy	2–0	Greece
Italy	1–1	FR Yugoslavia
FR Yugoslavia	2–1	Italy
Greece	0–5	FR Yugoslavia

=== Group 13 ===
All matches were played in Cyprus.

Teams	Pld	W	D	L	GF	GA	GD	Pts
Hungary	2	1	1	0	3	1	+2	4
Russia	2	1	1	0	2	1	+1	4
Cyprus	2	0	0	2	0	3	–3	0

Russia	1–0	Cyprus
Hungary	1–1	Russia
Cyprus	0–2	Hungary

=== Group 14 ===
All matches were played in Bulgaria.

Teams	Pld	W	D	L	GF	GA	GD	Pts
Bulgaria	2	1	1	0	10	2	+8	4
Georgia	2	0	2	0	4	4	0	2
Armenia	2	0	1	1	2	10	–8	1

Bulgaria	2–2	Georgia
Armenia	0–8	Bulgaria
Georgia	2–2	Armenia

== Round 2 ==
Team 1	Agg.	Team 2	1st leg	2nd leg
Netherlands	0–6	France	0–3	0–3
Norway	1–5	Republic of Ireland	1–2	0–3
England	2–4	Portugal	2–1	0–3
Croatia	0–1	Switzerland	0–1	0–0
Czech Republic	1–2	Spain	1–2	0–0
FR Yugoslavia	3–4	Israel	3–2	0–2
Hungary	4–1	Bulgaria	1–0	3–1

== See also ==
- 1997 UEFA European Under-18 Championship
