= 1988 UEFA European Under-18 Championship qualifying =

Football tournament qualification stage

This article features the 1988 UEFA European Under-18 Championship qualifying stage. Matches were played 1986 through 1988. Eight group winners qualified for the main tournament in Czechoslovakia.

== Group 1 ==
Teams	Pld	W	D	L	GF	GA	GD	Pts
Portugal	6	3	3	0	8	3	+5	9
West Germany	6	3	2	1	11	6	+5	8
France	6	2	2	2	6	5	+1	6
Switzerland	6	0	1	5	2	13	-11	1

26 November 1986

France	0 – 0	Portugal

Stade Moulonguet, Amiens
Attendance: 887
Referee: Aidan Gallagher (Ireland)
22 April 1987

France	3 – 0	Switzerland
Gava 60'; Albert Lobé 75'; Pérès 84'

Stade Léo Lagrange, Besançon
Attendance: 10,899
Referee: René Bindels (Luxembourg)

Portugal	1–0	Switzerland
Switzerland	0–3	West Germany
Switzerland	1–1	France
West Germany	3–3	Portugal
Portugal	2–0	France
West Germany	1–0	France
Portugal	0–0	West Germany
France	2–1	West Germany
Switzerland	0–2	Portugal
West Germany	3–1	Switzerland

== Group 2 ==
Teams	Pld	W	D	L	GF	GA	GD	Pts
Spain	6	6	0	0	21	0	+21	12
Italy	6	3	1	2	15	3	+12	7
Luxembourg	6	1	2	3	5	21	–16	4
Malta	6	0	1	5	3	20	–17	1

22 March 1987

Malta	2 – 2	Luxembourg
Magri Overend; Zammit

National Stadium, Ta' Qali
6 April 1988

Luxembourg	2 – 1	Malta
		Mark Psaila

Stade Achille Hammerel, Verlorenkost

Luxembourg	0–4	Spain
Malta	0–4	Italy
Italy	0–1	Spain
Italy	6–0	Luxembourg
Spain	6–0	Malta
Spain	7–0	Luxembourg
Italy	4–0	Malta
Spain	1–0	Italy
Malta	0–2	Spain
Luxembourg	1–1	Italy

== Group 3 ==
Teams	Pld	W	D	L	GF	GA	GD	Pts
Norway	6	4	2	0	14	4	+10	10
Scotland	6	2	3	1	9	8	+1	7
Wales	6	1	2	3	8	13	–5	4
Northern Ireland	6	1	1	4	8	14	–6	3

23 February 1988

Wales	1 – 4	Northern Ireland
		Murray; Glendinning; Johnston; Gray

Latham Park, Newtown

Norway	0–0	Scotland
Scotland	1–1	Wales
Scotland	2–2	Northern Ireland
Northern Ireland	1–2	Wales
Wales	0–2	Norway
Northern Ireland	0–2	Norway
Norway	5–1	Northern Ireland
Scotland	1–3	Norway
Norway	2–2	Wales
Wales	2–3	Scotland
Northern Ireland	0–2	Scotland

== Group 4 ==
Teams	Pld	W	D	L	GF	GA	GD	Pts
Denmark	6	3	2	1	9	4	+5	8
Poland	6	3	1	2	7	6	+1	7
Belgium	6	2	1	3	6	10	–4	5
Iceland	6	1	2	3	7	9	–2	4

6 May 1987

Belgium	0 – 1	Poland

Freethiel Stadion, Beveren
8 September 1987

Iceland	2 – 3	Poland

Reykjavík

Belgium	1–1	Denmark
Denmark	1–1	Iceland
Iceland	2–3	Belgium
Iceland	0–2	Denmark
Poland	0–0	Iceland
Belgium	0–2	Iceland
Denmark	2–0	Poland
Denmark	3–0	Belgium
Poland	2–0	Denmark
Poland	1–2	Belgium

== Group 5 ==
Teams	Pld	W	D	L	GF	GA	GD	Pts
East Germany	6	3	3	0	13	3	+10	9
Sweden	6	2	3	1	10	10	0	7
Republic of Ireland	6	1	3	2	4	8	–4	5
Finland	6	0	3	3	3	9	–6	3

9 June 1987

Finland	0 – 1	Republic of Ireland

Tehtaan kenttä, Valkeakoski
30 September 1987

Finland	0 – 3	East Germany

Hyvinkää
10 May 1988

Republic of Ireland	1 – 1	Finland

Dublin

Sweden	1–4	East Germany
East Germany	0–0	Finland
East Germany	4–0	Republic of Ireland
Finland	1–3	Sweden
Sweden	1–0	Republic of Ireland
Sweden	1–1	Finland
Republic of Ireland	2–2	Sweden
Republic of Ireland	0–0	East Germany
East Germany	2–2	Sweden

== Group 6 ==
Teams	Pld	W	D	L	GF	GA	GD	Pts
Soviet Union	6	4	1	1	15	6	+9	9
Romania	6	3	1	2	12	9	+3	7
Turkey	6	2	1	3	9	16	–7	5
Austria	6	0	3	3	6	11	–5	3

13 May 1987

Romania	3 – 1	Turkey

Gheorghe Șilaev Stadium, Plopeni
28 October 1987

Austria	2 – 3	Turkey
		Durmuş; Devrim

Alpenstadion, Kapfenberg
11 November 1987

Romania	2 – 1	Austria
Răducioiu 25'; Stănici 74' (pen.)		57' (o.g.) Vali Cristinel Stefanica

Brașov
11 May 1988

Austria	1 – 1	Soviet Union
Günter Quantschnigg 77'		24' Timoshenko

Kuchl

Romania	4–1	Soviet Union
Turkey	0–1	Soviet Union
Soviet Union	3–0	Austria
Soviet Union	2–0	Romania
Turkey	1–1	Austria
Soviet Union	7–1	Turkey
Austria	1–1	Romania
Turkey	3–2	Romania

== Group 7 ==
Teams	Pld	W	D	L	GF	GA	GD	Pts
Netherlands	6	2	3	1	5	3	+2	7
Bulgaria	6	3	1	2	11	10	+1	7
Hungary	6	2	1	3	11	7	+4	5
Albania	6	2	1	3	3	10	–7	5

23 March 1988

Albania	1 – 0	Bulgaria

Vojo Kushi Stadium, Shkodër

Albania	1–1	Netherlands
Netherlands	1–1	Bulgaria
Albania	1–0	Hungary
Bulgaria	4–1	Hungary
Hungary	7–1	Bulgaria
Bulgaria	4–0	Albania
Hungary	0–1	Netherlands
Bulgaria	1–0	Netherlands
Netherlands	2–0	Albania
Netherlands	0–0	Hungary
Hungary	3–0	Albania

== Group 8 ==
Teams	Pld	W	D	L	GF	GA	GD	Pts
Czechoslovakia	6	5	1	0	11	2	+9	11
Yugoslavia	6	4	0	2	15	5	+10	8
Cyprus	6	2	1	3	5	14	–9	5
Greece	6	0	0	6	2	12	–10	0

1 April 1987

Yugoslavia	5 – 0	Cyprus
S. Miletić 34', 55'; Lalić 36'; Lukić 46'; Ivica Vukov 51'

Valjevo
29 April 1987

Yugoslavia	4 – 0	Greece

Leskovac
7 October 1987

Greece	1 – 2	Yugoslavia

Alexandroupolis
4 November 1987

Cyprus	1 – 0	Greece

Paralimni
24 February 1988

Greece	1 – 2	Cyprus

Piraeus
23 March 1988

Cyprus	1 – 3	Yugoslavia

Larnaca

Czechoslovakia	2–0	Greece
Yugoslavia	1–2	Czechoslovakia
Czechoslovakia	1–0	Yugoslavia
Cyprus	0–0	Czechoslovakia
Czechoslovakia	5–1	Cyprus
Greece	0–1	Czechoslovakia

== See also ==
- 1988 UEFA European Under-18 Championship
