= 1983 UEFA European Under-18 Championship =

Tournament details
- Host country: England
- Dates: 13–22 May
- Teams: 16

Final positions
- Champions: France (2nd title)
- Runners-up: Czechoslovakia
- Third place: England
- Fourth place: Italy

The UEFA European Under-18 Championship 1983 Final Tournament was held in England.

== Qualification ==
=== Group 2 ===
Teams	Pld	W	D	L	GF	GA	GD	Pts
Scotland	4	3	1	0	8	2	+6	7
Wales	4	1	2	1	4	3	+1	4
Northern Ireland	4	0	1	3	2	9	–7	1

Wales	2–0	Northern Ireland
Scotland	1–1	Wales
Northern Ireland	1–1	Wales
Northern Ireland	0–3	Scotland
Wales	0–1	Scotland
Scotland	3–1	Northern Ireland

=== Group 13 ===
Teams	Pld	W	D	L	GF	GA	GD	Pts
Yugoslavia	4	3	0	1	10	3	+7	6
Hungary	4	3	0	1	5	3	+2	6
Austria	4	0	0	4	0	9	–9	0

Austria	0–5	Yugoslavia
Hungary	1–0	Austria
Yugoslavia	3–2	Hungary
Hungary	1–0	Yugoslavia
Austria	0–1	Hungary
Yugoslavia	2–0	Austria

=== Other Groups ===
Team 1	Agg.	Team 2	1st leg	2nd leg
Iceland	1–2	Republic of Ireland	1–1	0–1
Sweden	2–1	Denmark	0–0	2–1
Norway	1–2	Finland	0–0	1–2
Soviet Union	(a)2–2	Poland	1–0	1–2
Czechoslovakia	3–1	East Germany	1–0	2–1
Luxembourg	1–5	Belgium	1–1	0–4
Portugal	2–2(a)	France	2–1	0–1
Netherlands	1–2	Spain	1–0	0–2
West Germany	3–1	Switzerland	2–0	1–1
Malta	0–6	Italy	0–3	0–3
Cyprus	1–6	Romania	1–1	0–5
Bulgaria	4–1	Albania	4–0	0–1
Greece	3–4	Turkey	2–0	1–4

== Teams ==
The following teams qualified for the tournament:

- Belgium
- Bulgaria
- Czechoslovakia
- England (host)
- Finland
- France
- West Germany
- Italy
- Republic of Ireland
- Romania
- Scotland
- Soviet Union
- Spain
- Sweden
- Turkey
- Yugoslavia

== Group stage ==
=== Group A ===
Teams	Pld	W	D	L	GF	GA	GD	Pts
Czechoslovakia	3	1	2	0	4	2	+2	4
West Germany	3	2	0	1	5	4	+1	4
Bulgaria	3	1	1	1	2	3	–1	3
Sweden	3	0	1	2	1	3	–2	1

13 May	Czechoslovakia	3–1	West Germany
	Bulgaria	1–0	Sweden
15 May	Czechoslovakia	0–0	Bulgaria
	West Germany	1–0	Sweden
17 May	Czechoslovakia	1–1	Sweden
	West Germany	3–1	Bulgaria

=== Group B ===
Teams	Pld	W	D	L	GF	GA	GD	Pts
Italy	3	2	1	0	5	1	+4	5
Yugoslavia	3	2	0	1	5	3	+2	4
Romania	3	1	0	2	6	4	+2	2
Turkey	3	0	1	2	2	10	–8	1

13 May	Yugoslavia	2–0	Romania
	Italy	1–1	Turkey
15 May	Italy	2–0	Yugoslavia
Elm Park, Reading	Romania	6–0	Turkey
17 May	Yugoslavia	3–1	Turkey
	Italy	2–0	Romania

=== Group C ===
Teams	Pld	W	D	L	GF	GA	GD	Pts
England	3	2	0	1	5	4	+1	4
Scotland	3	1	1	1	6	5	+1	3
Spain	3	1	1	1	2	2	0	3
Soviet Union	3	1	0	2	2	4	–2	2

13 May	England	1–0	Spain
	Scotland	3–0	Soviet Union
15 May	England	4–2	Scotland
	Spain	1–0	Soviet Union
17 May	Soviet Union	2–0	England
	Spain	1–1	Scotland

=== Group D ===
Teams	Pld	W	D	L	GF	GA	GD	Pts
France	3	2	1	0	7	3	+4	5
Republic of Ireland	3	1	2	0	2	1	+1	4
Finland	3	1	1	1	5	3	+2	3
Belgium	3	0	0	3	1	8	–7	0

13 May	Republic of Ireland	1–0	Belgium
	France	3–1	Finland
15 May	Finland	0–0	Republic of Ireland
	France	3–1	Belgium
17 May	France	1–1	Republic of Ireland
	Finland	4–0	Belgium

== Semifinals ==
20 May 1983

Czechoslovakia	1 – 1	England
Penalties
	4 – 2

Highbury, London
20 May 1983

France	1 – 0	Italy

Stamford Bridge, London

== Third place match ==
22 May 1983

England	1 – 1	Italy
Penalties
	4 – 2

Watford
Referee: José Garcia Carrion (Spain)

== Final ==
22 May 1983

France	1 – 0	Czechoslovakia
Reuzeau 7'

White Hart Lane, London
Attendance: 4593
Referee: Zoran Petrovic (Yugoslavia)

1983 UEFA European Under-18 Championship

France
Second title
