= 1993 UEFA European Under-18 Championship qualifying =

Football tournament qualification stage

This article features the 1993 UEFA European Under-18 Championship qualifying stage. Matches were played 1992 through 1993. Two qualifying rounds were organised and seven teams qualified for the main tournament, joining host England.

== Round 1 ==
=== Group 1-9, 12 ===
Team 1	Agg.	Team 2	1st leg	2nd leg
Belgium	5–7	Iceland	3–2	2–5
Finland	(a)2–2	Scotland	1–0	1–2
Malta	0–4	France	0–0	0–4
Albania	1–7	Spain	0–4	1–3
Austria	3–4	Turkey	2–3	1–1
Cyprus	2–7	Hungary	0–2	2–5
Norway	3–4	Germany	2–3	1–1
Czechoslovakia	3–4	Denmark	1–0	2–4
Greece	3–5	Russia	2–2	1–3
Liechtenstein	0–16	Switzerland	0–8	0–8

=== Group 10 ===
Teams	Pld	W	D	L	GF	GA	GD	Pts
Netherlands	4	3	1	0	6	2	+4	7
Wales	4	0	3	1	3	4	–1	3
Israel	4	0	2	2	3	6	–3	2

Wales	0–0	Israel
Wales	0–1	Netherlands
Netherlands	3–1	Israel
Netherlands	1–1	Wales
Israel	0–1	Netherlands
Israel	2–2	Wales

=== Group 11 ===
Teams	Pld	W	D	L	GF	GA	GD	Pts
Romania	4	3	1	0	10	4	+6	7
Republic of Ireland	4	1	2	1	7	7	0	4
Northern Ireland	4	0	1	3	8	14	–6	1

Romania	4–2	Northern Ireland
Romania	1–0	Republic of Ireland
Northern Ireland	2–3	Republic of Ireland
Republic of Ireland	1–1	Romania
Northern Ireland	1–4	Romania
Republic of Ireland	3–3	Northern Ireland

=== Group 13 ===
All matches were played in Luxembourg.

Teams	Pld	W	D	L	GF	GA	GD	Pts
Portugal	2	2	0	0	5	1	+4	4
Sweden	2	1	0	1	3	3	0	2
Luxembourg	2	0	0	2	1	5	–4	0

Luxembourg	1–2	Sweden
Luxembourg	0–3	Portugal
Portugal	2–1	Sweden

=== Group 14 ===
Teams	Pld	W	D	L	GF	GA	GD	Pts
Italy	4	4	0	0	12	2	+10	8
Bulgaria	4	1	1	2	6	8	–2	3
Poland	4	0	1	3	4	12	–8	1

26 August 1992

Poland	1 – 3	Bulgaria
Frankowski 78'		6' Borisov; 40' (pen.) D. Georgiev; 90' Spasov

Stadion Miejski, Błonie
Attendance: 500
Referee: Svend Erik Christensen (Denmark)
16 September 1992

Bulgaria	2 – 2	Poland
Georgiev 25'; Nikolov 84'		6' Piekarski; 10' Mariusz Osiecki

Stadion Iskar, Samokov
14 October 1992

Poland	1 – 5	Italy
Frankowski 6'		12', 24', 39' Del Piero; 42' Della Morte; 85' Pirri

Stadion Miejski, Błonie
28 October 1992

Italy	3 – 1	Bulgaria
Del Piero 2'; Flachi 26', 40'		85' Borisov

Ischia
11 November 1992

Italy	2 – 0	Poland
Del Piero 62'; Della Morte 78'

Stadio Silvio Piola, Vercelli
25 November 1992

Bulgaria	0 – 2	Italy
		23' (o.g.) Radoslav Kresnichki; 79' Della Morte

Sandanski Stadium, Sandanski

== Round 2 ==
Team 1	Agg.	Team 2	1st leg	2nd leg
Netherlands	5–2	Denmark	2–1	3–1
Portugal	2–1	Russia	2–1	0–0
Italy	1–2	Hungary	0–2	1–0
Turkey	3–1	Switzerland	2–1	1–0
Finland	5–6	France	3–4	2–2
Romania	1–0	Iceland	0–0	1–0
Germany	2–5	Spain	0–0	2–5

== See also ==
- 1993 UEFA European Under-18 Championship
