= 1990 UEFA European Under-18 Championship qualifying =

Football tournament qualification stage

This article features the 1990 UEFA European Under-18 Championship qualifying stage. Matches were played 1988 through 1990. Eight group winners qualified for the main tournament in Hungary.

== Group 1 ==
Teams	Pld	W	D	L	GF	GA	GD	Pts
Sweden	6	3	2	1	15	4	+11	8
Poland	6	3	2	1	7	8	–1	8
West Germany	6	3	1	2	5	7	–2	7
Scotland	6	0	1	5	3	11	–8	1

Scotland	0–0	Sweden
Scotland	1–2	Poland
West Germany	0–0	Poland
West Germany	1–0	Scotland
Sweden	4–0	West Germany
Sweden	4–0	Poland
Poland	2–1	Scotland
Sweden	4–0	Scotland
Poland	1–0	West Germany
Poland	2–2	Sweden
Scotland	1–2	West Germany
West Germany	2–1	Sweden

== Group 2 ==
Teams	Pld	W	D	L	GF	GA	GD	Pts
Soviet Union	6	6	0	0	13	2	+11	12
Norway	6	2	2	2	8	7	+1	6
Netherlands	6	1	2	3	6	13	–7	4
Cyprus	6	0	2	4	2	7	–5	2

Norway	2–2	Netherlands
Cyprus	0–0	Norway
Netherlands	2–1	Cyprus
Soviet Union	2–0	Cyprus
Norway	1–0	Cyprus
Norway	0–1	Soviet Union
Soviet Union	3–0	Norway
Netherlands	1–5	Norway
Netherlands	0–3	Soviet Union
Cyprus	1–2	Soviet Union
Soviet Union	2–1	Netherlands
Cyprus	0–0	Netherlands

== Group 3 ==
Teams	Pld	W	D	L	GF	GA	GD	Pts
England	6	3	2	1	10	2	+8	8
France	6	2	3	1	6	5	+1	7
Czechoslovakia	6	2	2	2	4	3	+1	6
Greece	6	1	1	4	5	15	–10	3

England	5–0	Greece
England	1–1	France
Greece	2–3	France
Greece	0–3	England
Czechoslovakia	0–0	Greece
Czechoslovakia	1–0	England
France	1–0	Czechoslovakia
Greece	1–3	Czechoslovakia
France	0–0	England
Czechoslovakia	0–0	France
England	1–0	Czechoslovakia
France	1–2	Greece

== Group 4 ==
Teams	Pld	W	D	L	GF	GA	GD	Pts
Portugal	6	5	1	0	11	1	+10	11
Italy	6	4	1	1	10	3	+7	9
Albania	6	1	0	5	6	8	–2	2
Switzerland	6	1	0	5	1	16	–15	2

Albania	4–0	Switzerland
Portugal	2–1	Albania
Albania	1–2	Italy
Switzerland	0–3	Portugal
Albania	0–2	Portugal
Switzerland	0–2	Italy
Italy	1–0	Albania
Portugal	2–0	Switzerland
Italy	0–2	Portugal
Switzerland	1–0	Albania
Italy	5–0	Switzerland
Portugal	0–0	Italy

== Group 5 ==
Teams	Pld	W	D	L	GF	GA	GD	Pts
Belgium	6	3	1	2	10	6	+4	7
Yugoslavia	6	3	0	3	8	7	+1	6
Wales	6	2	2	2	7	10	–3	6
East Germany	6	1	3	2	4	6	–2	5

East Germany	0–1	Yugoslavia
Belgium	1–1	East Germany
Yugoslavia	4–1	Wales
Wales	2–0	Belgium

29 March 1989

Belgium	2 – 1	Yugoslavia
Van Overtvelt 4'; Suray 16'		67' Velkovski

Schiervelde Stadion, Roeselare

Wales	0–0	East Germany
East Germany	0–2	Belgium
Yugoslavia	1–2	East Germany
Yugoslavia	1–0	Belgium
Belgium	5–1	Wales
East Germany	1–1	Wales
Wales	2–0	Yugoslavia

== Group 6 ==
Teams	Pld	W	D	L	GF	GA	GD	Pts
Republic of Ireland	4	3	0	1	8	1	+7	6
Bulgaria	4	3	0	1	4	4	0	6
Malta	4	0	0	4	1	8	–7	0
Iceland	Withdrew after one match							

Republic of Ireland	3–0	Iceland
Malta	1–2	Bulgaria

27 May 1989

Republic of Ireland	2 – 0	Malta
32' (pen.) Alan O'Sullivan; 73' McGrath

Dalymount Park, Dublin

Bulgaria	1–0	Malta
Republic of Ireland	3–0	Bulgaria
Malta	0–3	Republic of Ireland
Bulgaria	1–0	Republic of Ireland

== Group 7 ==
Teams	Pld	W	D	L	GF	GA	GD	Pts
Spain	6	4	1	1	12	7	+5	9
Denmark	6	2	2	2	11	10	+1	6
Romania	6	1	4	1	7	7	0	6
Austria	6	0	3	3	4	10	–6	3

Spain	4–2	Denmark
Austria	1–2	Spain
Austria	1–1	Romania
Denmark	2–0	Spain
Romania	1–3	Spain
Denmark	2–2	Romania
Denmark	4–1	Austria
Spain	0–0	Romania
Austria	0–0	Denmark
Romania	0–0	Austria
Romania	3–1	Denmark
Spain	3–1	Austria

== Group 8 ==
Teams	Pld	W	D	L	GF	GA	GD	Pts
Hungary	6	4	2	0	14	2	+12	10
Turkey	6	3	3	0	12	6	+6	9
Finland	6	2	1	3	12	8	+4	5
Luxembourg	6	0	0	6	3	25	–22	0

Finland	0–1	Hungary
Luxembourg	0–5	Finland
Turkey	3–1	Luxembourg
Hungary	6–0	Luxembourg
Hungary	3–0	Finland

7 June 1989

Finland	2 – 2	Turkey
Nyyssönen 30', 90'		28', 53' Şükür

Turkey	1–0	Finland
Finland	5–1	Luxembourg
Hungary	2–2	Turkey
Luxembourg	0–2	Hungary
Turkey	0–0	Hungary
Luxembourg	1–4	Turkey

== See also ==
- 1990 UEFA European Under-18 Championship
