= 1982 UEFA European Under-18 Championship =

1982 Jalkapallon alle 18-vuotiaiden Euroopan-mestaruuskilpailut 1982 U18-Europamästerskapet i fotboll

Tournament details
- Host country: Finland
- Dates: 21–30 May
- Teams: 16

Final positions
- Champions: Scotland (1st title)
- Runners-up: Czechoslovakia
- Third place: Soviet Union
- Fourth place: Poland

The UEFA European Under-18 Championship 1982 Final Tournament was held in Finland. It also served as the European qualification for the 1983 FIFA World Youth Championship. The competition was won by Scotland, their first tournament win at any international level.

== Qualification ==
=== Group 8 ===
Teams	Pld	W	D	L	GF	GA	GD	Pts
West Germany	4	4	0	0	11	0	+11	8
France	4	2	0	2	10	5	+5	4
Luxembourg	4	0	0	4	2	18	–16	0

France	0–2	West Germany
Luxembourg	2–4	France
France	6–0	Luxembourg
Luxembourg	0–5	West Germany
West Germany	1–0	France
West Germany	3–0	Luxembourg

=== Other groups ===
Team 1	Agg.	Team 2	1st leg	2nd leg
Wales	2–2 (4-5p)	Netherlands	1–1	1–1
Northern Ireland	1–2	Republic of Ireland	1–0	0–2
Iceland	3–4	Belgium	2–2	1–2
Scotland	3–2	England	1–0	2–2
Poland	2–1	Sweden	2–1	0–0
Denmark	0–3	Czechoslovakia	0–0	0–3
Norway	0–3	Soviet Union	0–2	0–1
Austria	3–2	Italy	0–1	3–1
Malta	0–5	Spain	0–0	0–5
Portugal	2–1	Switzerland	1–0	1–1
Greece	1–2	Hungary	1–1	0–1
Romania	2–4	Bulgaria	2–2	0–2
Albania	4–2	Cyprus	4–0	0–2
Turkey	0–0 (4–2p)	Yugoslavia	0–0	0–0

== Teams ==
The following teams qualified for the tournament:

- Albania
- Austria
- Belgium
- Bulgaria
- Czechoslovakia
- Finland (host)
- West Germany
- Hungary
- Netherlands
- Poland
- Portugal
- Republic of Ireland
- Scotland
- Soviet Union
- Spain
- Turkey

== Group stage ==
=== Group A ===
Teams	Pld	W	D	L	GF	GA	GD	Pts
Soviet Union	3	3	0	0	7	1	+6	6
Austria	3	2	0	1	9	7	+2	4
West Germany	3	1	0	2	2	5	–3	2
Republic of Ireland	3	0	0	3	2	7	–5	0

21 May	West Germany	1–0	Republic of Ireland
	Soviet Union	4–1	Austria
23 May	Austria	4–1	West Germany
	Soviet Union	2–0	Republic of Ireland
25 May	Soviet Union	1–0	West Germany
	Austria	4–2	Republic of Ireland

=== Group B ===
Teams	Pld	W	D	L	GF	GA	GD	Pts
Poland	3	2	1	0	2	0	+2	5
Belgium	3	2	0	1	4	2	+2	4
Bulgaria	3	1	1	1	2	2	0	3
Spain	3	0	0	3	2	6	–4	0

21 May	Bulgaria	2–1	Spain
	Poland	1–0	Belgium
23 May	Poland	1–0	Spain
	Belgium	1–0	Bulgaria
25 May	Belgium	3–1	Spain
	Bulgaria	0–0	Poland

=== Group C ===
Teams	Pld	W	D	L	GF	GA	GD	Pts
Czechoslovakia	3	2	1	0	5	2	+3	5
Portugal	3	1	2	0	4	3	+1	4
Finland	3	1	1	1	5	5	0	3
Hungary	3	0	0	3	3	7	–4	0

21 May	Czechoslovakia	2–1	Finland
	Portugal	2–1	Hungary
23 May	Finland	3–2	Hungary
	Portugal	1–1	Czechoslovakia
25 May	Portugal	1–1	Finland
	Czechoslovakia	2–0	Hungary

=== Group D ===
Teams	Pld	W	D	L	GF	GA	GD	Pts
Scotland	3	2	1	0	6	1	+5	5
Netherlands	3	2	1	0	7	3	+4	5
Turkey	3	0	1	2	2	6	–4	1
Albania	3	0	1	2	2	7	–5	1

21 May	Scotland	3–0	Albania
	Netherlands	3–1	Turkey
23 May	Scotland	2–0	Turkey
	Netherlands	3–1	Albania
25 May	Scotland	1–1	Netherlands
	Turkey	1–1	Albania

== Semifinals ==
28 May 1982

Czechoslovakia	1 – 0	Soviet Union

Hämeenlinna
28 May 1982

Scotland	2 – 0	Poland

Lahti

== Third place match ==
30 May 1982

Poland	1 – 3	Soviet Union

Helsinki
Referee: Albert Thomas (Netherlands)

== Final ==
30 May 1982

Scotland	3 – 1	Czechoslovakia
Philliben; Nevin; Mackay

Helsinki
Attendance: 2500
Referee: Karl-Heinz Tritschler (West Germany)

1982 UEFA European Under-18 Championship

Scotland
First title

== Qualification to World Youth Championship ==
The six best performing teams qualified for the 1983 FIFA World Youth Championship: four semifinalists and the best group runners-up (based on points, goal difference and scored goals).

- Austria
- Czechoslovakia
- Netherlands
- Poland
- Scotland
- Soviet Union
