= Mërgim =

- Gender: Male

Origin
- Region of origin: Albania, Kosovo

Mërgim is an Albanian masculine given name and may refer to:

- Mërgim Bajraktari (born 1993), Swiss-Albanian footballer
- Mërgim Berisha (born 1998), Kosovar-German footballer
- Mërgim Brahimi (born 1992), Kosovar footballer
- Mërgim Fejzullahu (born 1994), Albanian footballer
- Mërgim Mavraj (born 1986), German-Albanian footballer
- Mërgim Neziri (born 1993), German-Albanian footballer
- Mërgim Vojvoda (born 1995), Kosovar footballer
