= San Marino national under-19 football team =

San Marino U19
- Association: Federazione Sammarinese Giuoco Calcio
- Head coach: Roberto Marcucci
- Most caps: Marco Gasperoni (5)
- Top scorer: Marco Gasperoni (3)
| First colours | Second colours |

First international
- Malta 2–0 San Marino (Valletta, Malta; 22 November 1993)

Biggest win
- Gibraltar 0–4 San Marino (Gibraltar; 30 August 2022)

Biggest defeat
- Israel 14–0 San Marino (Ashkelon, Israel; 24 October 1997)

The San Marino national U-19 football team is the national under-19 football team of San Marino and is controlled by the San Marino Football Federation.

The team's head coach is Roberto Marcucci.

They compete in UEFA European Under-19 Football Championship qualifying rounds every year. They have played 33 official games with 32 defeats and only one draw.

On August 30, 2022. San Marino U19 achieved its first victory in a 4–0 win against Gibraltar.

== Competitive record ==
=== UEFA European Under-19 Championship ===
| UEFA European Under-19 Championship record | | | | | | | | | Qualification record | | | | | |
| Year | Round | Position | Pld | W | D | L | GF | GA | Pld | W | D | L | GF | GA |
|---|---|---|---|---|---|---|---|---|---|---|---|---|---|---|
| (Spain) 1994 | Did not qualify | | | | | | | | 2 | 0 | 0 | 2 | 1 | 10 |
| (Greece) 1995 | Did not qualify | | | | | | | | 4 | 0 | 0 | 4 | 1 | 19 |
| (France) 1996 | Did not enter | | | | | | | | Did not enter | | | | | |
| (Iceland) 1997 | Did not enter | | | | | | | | Did not enter | | | | | |
| (Cyprus) 1998 | Did not qualify | | | | | | | | 2 | 0 | 0 | 2 | 0 | 26 |
| (Sweden) 1999 | Did not qualify | | | | | | | | 6 | 0 | 0 | 6 | 0 | 29 |
| (Germany) 2000 | Did not qualify | | | | | | | | 3 | 0 | 0 | 3 | 0 | 18 |
| (Finland) 2001 | Did not qualify | | | | | | | | 3 | 0 | 0 | 3 | 0 | 13 |
| (Norway) 2002 | Did not qualify | | | | | | | | 3 | 0 | 1 | 2 | 1 | 13 |
| (Liechtenstein) 2003 | Did not qualify | | | | | | | | 3 | 0 | 0 | 3 | 0 | 17 |
| (Switzerland) 2004 | Did not qualify | | | | | | | | 3 | 0 | 1 | 2 | 2 | 18 |
| (Northern Ireland) 2005 | Did not qualify | | | | | | | | 3 | 0 | 0 | 3 | 0 | 18 |
| (Poland) 2006 | Did not qualify | | | | | | | | 3 | 0 | 0 | 3 | 1 | 16 |
| (Austria) 2007 | Did not qualify | | | | | | | | 3 | 0 | 0 | 3 | 0 | 15 |
| (Czech Republic) 2008 | Did not qualify | | | | | | | | 3 | 0 | 0 | 3 | 0 | 10 |
| (Ukraine) 2009 | Did not qualify | | | | | | | | 3 | 0 | 0 | 3 | 0 | 10 |
| (France) 2010 | Did not qualify | | | | | | | | 3 | 0 | 0 | 3 | 1 | 13 |
| (Romania) 2011 | Did not qualify | | | | | | | | 3 | 0 | 0 | 3 | 0 | 12 |
| (Estonia) 2012 | Did not qualify | | | | | | | | 3 | 0 | 0 | 3 | 0 | 15 |
| (Lithuania) 2013 | Did not qualify | | | | | | | | 3 | 0 | 0 | 3 | 0 | 10 |
| (Hungary) 2014 | Did not qualify | | | | | | | | 3 | 0 | 0 | 3 | 0 | 12 |
| (Greece) 2015 | Did not qualify | | | | | | | | 3 | 0 | 0 | 3 | 0 | 12 |
| (Germany) 2016 | Did not qualify | | | | | | | | 3 | 0 | 0 | 3 | 1 | 16 |
| (Georgia (country)) 2017 | Did not qualify | | | | | | | | 3 | 0 | 0 | 3 | 0 | 19 |
| (Finland) 2018 | Did not qualify | | | | | | | | 3 | 0 | 0 | 3 | 0 | 11 |
| (Armenia) 2019 | Did not qualify | | | | | | | | 3 | 0 | 0 | 3 | 1 | 9 |
| (Northern Ireland) 2020 | Cancelled | | | | | | | | 3 | 0 | 0 | 3 | 1 | 16 |
| (Slovakia) 2022 | Did not qualify | | | | | | | | 3 | 0 | 0 | 3 | 1 | 10 |
| (Malta) 2023 | Did not qualify | | | | | | | | 3 | 0 | 0 | 3 | 0 | 8 |
| (Northern Ireland) 2024 | Did not qualify | | | | | | | | 3 | 0 | 0 | 3 | 0 | 21 |
| (Romania) 2025 | Did not qualify | | | | | | | | 3 | 0 | 0 | 3 | 0 | 11 |
| (Wales) 2026 | Did not qualify | | | | | | | | 3 | 0 | 0 | 3 | 0 | 11 |
| (Czech Republic) 2027 | Did not qualify | | | | | | | | 6 | 0 | 1 | 5 | 3 | 19 |
| Total | – | | | | | | | | 98 | 0 | 3 | 93 | 14 | 457 |

== Players ==
=== Current Squad ===
The following players were called up for the 2027 UEFA European Under-19 Championship qualification matches against Slovakia, Belarus, and Latvia on 15, 18, and 21 May 2026; respectively.

| No. | Pos. | Player | Date of birth (age) | Club |
|---|---|---|---|---|
| 1 | GK | Alessandro Cenci | 9 September 2008 (age 18) | (San Marino Football Federation) San Marino |
| 12 | GK | Francesco Della Balda | 10 March 2007 (age 19) | (San Marino Football Federation) San Marino |
| 3 | DF | Michele Stefani | 7 September 2009 (age 17) | (San Marino Football Federation) San Marino |
| 5 | DF | Alex Colombini | 1 July 2008 (age 18) | (San Marino Football Federation) San Marino |
| 6 | DF | Diego Marani (captain) | 23 March 2007 (age 19) | (San Marino Football Federation) San Marino |
| 13 | DF | Tommaso Bindi | 6 July 2007 (age 19) | (San Marino Football Federation) San Marino |
| 16 | MF | Luca Pennacchini | 12 May 2008 (age 18) | (Italian Football Federation) Lunano Calcio |
| 17 | MF | Luca Pasolini | 14 November 2007 (age 19) | (San Marino Football Federation) San Marino |
| 4 | MF | Nicola Molinari | 27 October 2008 (age 18) | (San Marino Football Federation) San Marino |
| 8 | MF | Lorenzo Giordani | 20 October 2008 (age 18) | (San Marino Football Federation) San Marino |
| 10 | MF | Cristian Meloni | 12 March 2008 (age 18) | (San Marino Football Federation) San Marino |
| 18 | MF | Francesco Bucchi | 16 April 2009 (age 17) | (San Marino Football Federation) San Marino |
| 19 | MF | Samuele Forcellini | 24 January 2007 (age 19) | (San Marino Football Federation) San Marino |
| 7 | MF | Federico Guidi | 19 December 2008 (age 17) | (San Marino Football Federation) San Marino |
| 20 | FW | Alessandro Mularoni | 21 September 2007 (age 19) | (San Marino Football Federation) San Marino |
| 15 | FW | Filippo Valentini | 28 July 2007 (age 19) | (San Marino Football Federation) San Marino |
| 9 | FW | Giacomo Grandoni | 22 January 2008 (age 18) | (San Marino Football Federation) San Marino |
| 14 | FW | Federico Raschi | 25 November 2009 (age 16) | (San Marino Football Federation) San Marino |

== Recent results and fixtures ==
| 28 August 2022 Friendly | Gibraltar | 3–1 | San Marino | Gibraltar |
| | Gonzalez 27'; Jessop 83'; Emrani 90' | | Santi 24' (pen.) | Stadium: Victoria Stadium |

| 30 August 2022 Friendly | Gibraltar | 0–4 | San Marino | Gibraltar |
| | | | M. Gasperoni 13', 18', 29'; Santi 80' | Stadium: Victoria Stadium |
