= Andorra national under-19 football team =

Andorra U-19
- Nickname: Tricolors (The Tricolours)
- Association: Federació Andorrana de Futbol
- Confederation: UEFA (Europe)
- Head coach: Óscar Sonejee
- Captain: Víctor Aroca
- FIFA code: AND
First colours	Second colours

First international
- Andorra 0–10 Croatia (Belfast, Northern Ireland; 5 November 1997)

Biggest win
- Andorra 4–2 Liechtenstein (Andorra la Vella, Andorra; 30 October 2016); Andorra 2–0 Liechtenstein (Buftea, Romania; 31 March 2026)

Biggest defeat
- Andorra 0–13 Czech Republic (Mnichovo Hradiště, Czech Republic; 13 October 2001)

European Championship
- Appearances: 0

FIFA U-20 World Cup
- Appearances: 0

The Andorra national under-19 football team represents Andorra in international football at this age level and is controlled by Federació Andorrana de Futbol, the governing body for football in Andorra.

== UEFA European Under-19 Championship Record ==
European Under-19 Championship record									Qualification record					
Year	Round	Position	Pld	W	D	L	GF	GA	Pld	W	D	L	GF	GA
(Cyprus) 1998	did not qualify								2	0	0	2	0	15
(Sweden) 1999	did not qualify								3	0	0	3	0	19
(Germany) 2000	did not qualify								2	0	0	2	0	20
(Finland) 2001	did not qualify								3	0	0	3	0	15
(Norway) 2002	did not qualify								3	0	0	3	0	23
(Liechtenstein) 2003	did not qualify								3	0	0	3	0	10
(Switzerland) 2004	did not qualify								3	0	0	3	1	10
(Northern Ireland) 2005	did not qualify								3	0	0	3	0	14
(Poland) 2006	did not qualify								3	0	0	3	0	23
(Austria) 2007	did not qualify								3	0	0	3	0	7
(Czech Republic) 2008	did not qualify								3	0	0	3	1	9
(Ukraine) 2009	did not qualify								3	0	0	3	0	12
(France) 2010	did not qualify								3	0	0	3	1	11
(Romania) 2011	did not qualify								3	0	0	3	1	18
(Estonia) 2012	did not qualify								3	0	0	3	0	12
(Lithuania) 2013	did not qualify								3	0	0	3	0	19
(Hungary) 2014	did not qualify								3	0	0	3	0	18
(Greece) 2015	did not qualify								3	0	0	3	1	12
(Germany) 2016	did not qualify								3	0	1	2	1	4
(Georgia (country)) 2017	did not qualify								3	1	0	2	6	6
(Finland) 2018	did not qualify								3	0	1	2	2	10
(Armenia) 2019	did not qualify								3	0	0	3	0	9
(Northern Ireland) 2020	did not qualify								3	0	0	3	0	7
(Slovakia) 2022	did not qualify								3	0	0	3	0	12
(Malta) 2023	did not qualify								3	0	0	3	0	8
(Northern Ireland) 2024	did not qualify								3	1	0	2	3	5
(Romania) 2025	did not qualify								3	0	0	3	0	4
(Wales) 2026	did not qualify								3	1	0	2	2	7
(Czech Republic) 2027	did not qualify								5	1	0	4	3	13
Total	—	0/29	–	–	–	–	–	–	87	4	2	81	22	352

== Current squad ==
The following players were called for the matches against Poland and Luxembourg on 11 and 14 November 2026. Caps and goals correct as of 14 November 2026, after the match against Luxembourg.

No.	Pos.	Player	Date of birth (age)	Caps	Goals	Club
1	GK	Víctor Aroca (C)	2 May 2008 (age 18)	10	0	(Royal Spanish Football Federation) La Escuela U19
13	GK	Teo Permuy	20 November 2009 (age 16)	0	0	(Andorran Football Federation) ENFAF U19
2	DF	Lucas Lourenço	6 April 2008 (age 18)	5	0	(Royal Spanish Football Federation) Reus U19
3	DF	Marcel Permuy	12 November 2008 (age 18)	6	0	Unattached
4	DF	Juanfran Haddad	14 August 2009 (age 17)	8	0	(Royal Spanish Football Federation) Mercantil U19
5	DF	Arnau Foubert	23 April 2009 (age 17)	0	0	Unattached
17	DF	Ramon Barral	11 June 2009 (age 17)	5	0	(Royal Spanish Football Federation) La Escuela U19
19	DF	Joel Viana	21 July 2008 (age 18)	3	0	Unattached
6	MF	Manel Anglada	22 March 2008 (age 18)	8	1	(Royal Spanish Football Federation) La Escuela U19
10	MF	Valentí Martí	21 January 2008 (age 18)	3	0	(Royal Spanish Football Federation) Horta U19
14	MF	Roger Solà	26 August 2009 (age 17)	4	0	(Royal Spanish Football Federation) Atlètic Segre U19
7	FW	Josep Contreras	14 January 2008 (age 18)	2	0	(Royal Spanish Football Federation) Poble Sec U19
8	FW	Rafa Gaiteiro	5 July 2008 (age 18)	2	0	Unattached
9	FW	César González	21 June 2008 (age 18)	8	4	(Royal Spanish Football Federation) La Escuela U19
11	FW	Hugo Trindade	24 June 2008 (age 18)	3	0	(Andorran Football Federation) ENFAF U19
18	FW	Owen Soriano	7 May 2009 (age 17)	2	0	(Andorran Football Federation) ENFAF U19
20	FW	Hugo Pinto	1 February 2008 (age 18)	5	0	(Royal Spanish Football Federation) Poble Sec U19
21	FW	Ian Gil	21 April 2008 (age 18)	4	0	(Andorran Football Federation) ENFAF U19
22	FW	Carlos González	29 January 2009 (age 17)	4	0	(Andorran Football Federation) ENFAF U19
23	FW	Christian Sánchez	19 June 2009 (age 17)	5	0	(Andorran Football Federation) ENFAF U19

== See also ==
- Andorra national football team
