= 1993 UEFA European Under-18 Championship =

Tournament details
- Host country: England
- Dates: 18–25 July
- Teams: 8
- Venues: 7 (in 7 host cities)

Final positions
- Champions: England (9th title)
- Runners-up: Turkey
- Third place: Spain
- Fourth place: Portugal

Tournament statistics
- Matches played: 14
- Goals scored: 39 (2.79 per match)
- Top scorer: (England) Robbie Fowler

The UEFA European Under-18 Championship 1993 Final Tournament was held in England. Players born on or after 1 August 1974 were eligible to participate in this competition.

== Teams ==
The following teams qualified for the tournament:

- France
- England (host)
- Hungary
- Netherlands
- Portugal
- Romania
- Spain
- Turkey

== Referees ==
- Hans-Peter Dellwig (Germany)
- Charles Agius (Malta)
- Gerd Grabher (Austria)
- Roy Helge Olsen (Norway)
- Veselin Bogdanov (Bulgaria)
- Piero Ceccarini (Italy)
- Eyolfur Olafsson (Iceland)
- Jiří Ulrich (Czechoslovakia)

== Group stage ==
=== Group A ===
Teams	Pld	W	D	L	GF	GA	GD	Pts
Turkey	3	2	1	0	6	1	+5	5
Portugal	3	1	1	1	2	2	0	3
Hungary	3	1	1	1	2	3	–1	3
Romania	3	0	1	2	0	4	–4	1

18 July	Portugal	0–0	Romania
	Hungary	1–1	Turkey
20 July	Portugal	2–0	Hungary
	Romania	0–3	Turkey
22 July	Turkey	2–0	Portugal
	Romania	0–1	Hungary

=== Group B ===
Teams	Pld	W	D	L	GF	GA	GD	Pts
England	3	3	0	0	11	2	+9	6
Spain	3	2	0	1	8	8	0	4
Netherlands	3	0	1	2	4	8	–4	1
France	3	0	1	2	2	7	–5	1

18 July	England	2–0	France
	Spain	3–2	Netherlands
20 July	England	4–1	Netherlands
	Spain	4–1	France
22 July	Netherlands	1–1	France
	England	5–1	Spain

== Third place match ==
25 July 1993

Spain	2 – 1	Portugal
Galvez 11'; Garcia 44'		40' Nuno Luis

Nottingham
Referee: Charles Agius (Malta)

== Final ==
25 July 1993

England	1 – 0	Turkey
Caskey 77' (pen.)	Report

City Ground, Nottingham
Attendance: 23,381
Referee: Roy Helge Olsen (Norway)

1993 UEFA European Under-18 Championship

England
Ninth title

== See also ==
- 1993 UEFA European Under-18 Championship qualifying
