= Erjon Rizvanolli =

Albanian retired football player

Personal information
- Date of birth: 14 August 1981 (age 45)
- Place of birth: Tirana, PSR Albania
- Height: 1.80 m (5 ft 11 in)
- Position: Striker

Senior career*
Years	Team	Apps	(Gls)
1999–2001	Tirana	24	(7)
2001–2003	NK Zagreb	7	(0)
2003	Dinamo Tirana	1	(0)
2003–2005	Shkumbini	25	(14)
2005	Tatabánya	8	(1)
2006	Elbasani		
2006–2007	Shkumbini	28	(9)
2007–2008	Kastrioti	30	(10)
2008–2009	Shkumbini	23	(7)
2009–2010	Vllaznia	6	(0)
2010	Besëlidhja		

International career^{‡}
2004	Albania U-21	9	(2)
- * Club domestic league appearances and goals as of 1 November 2009 ‡ National team caps and goals as of 1 November 2009

Erjon Rizvanolli (born 14 August 1981) is an Albanian retired football player. The striker had three different spells with Shkumbini Peqin.

== Club career ==
Rizvanolli previously played for Croatian side NK Zagreb, appearing in seven Prva HNL matches during the 2001–02 and 2002–03 seasons.
