= Frankenstadion Heilbronn =

Football stadium in Heilbronn, Germany

Coordinates: 49°5′7″N 9°12′12″E

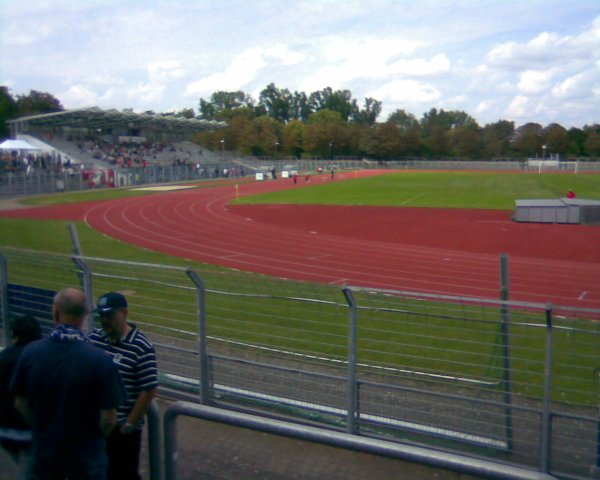
- Interactive map of Frankenstadion Heilbronn
- Location: Heilbronn, Germany
- Capacity: 17,200

Tenant
- FC Heilbronn

Frankenstadion Heilbronn is a multi-use stadium in Heilbronn, Germany. It is currently used mostly for football matches and is the home stadium of FC Heilbronn. The stadium is able to hold 17,200 people.
