= Mërgim Bajraktari =

Swiss-born Albanian footballer (born 1993)

Personal information
- Full name: Mërgim Bajraktari
- Date of birth: 27 May 1993 (age 33)
- Place of birth: Basel, Switzerland
- Height: 1.82 m (6 ft 0 in)
- Position: Defensive midfielder

Youth career
- 2001–2006: FC Basel
- 2006–2008: Concordia Basel
- 2008–2011: Yverdon-Sport FC
- 2011–2013: FC Thun

Senior career*
Years	Team	Apps	(Gls)
2011	Yverdon-Sport	1	(0)
2011–2013	FC Thun II	28	(1)
2014–2015	Stade Nyonnais	24	(1)
2015–2017	Black Stars Basel		
2018–2019	AS Timau		
2019–	FC Liestal		

International career^{‡}
2011	Albania U18	2	(0)
2011	Albania U19	3	(1)
2012–2013	Albania U21	4	(0)
- * Club domestic league appearances and goals as of 15 January 2015 ‡ National team caps and goals as of 8 October 2011

Mërgim Bajraktari (born 27 May 1993) is a footballer who last played for FC Liestal. Born in Switzerland, he represented Albania at youth international levels.

== Club career ==
On 1 July 2015, Bajraktari started a trial at Scottish Premiership side Hearts and he started in a 2–0 friendly win over Irish side Bohemian FC on the same day.

== Managerial career ==
Bajraktari currently manages in the Swizz lower leagues.
