= Mateo Hasa =

Albanian Football Player

Personal information
- Date of birth: 23 May 1993 (age 33)
- Place of birth: Kavajë, Albania
- Height: 1.88 m (6 ft 2 in)
- Position: Forward

Senior career*
Years	Team	Apps	(Gls)
2010–2013	Besa	45	(5)
2013	Albpetrol	11	(0)
2014	Lushnja	0	(0)
2014	→ Shkumbini (loan)	7	(0)
2015–2017	Besa	62	(16)
2017	Egnatia	4	(0)
2018	Burreli	1	(0)

International career
2012	Albania U-19	1	
- * Club domestic league appearances and goals

Mateo Hasa (born 23 May 1993) is an Albanian football player, who most recently played as a striker for Burreli football club in Albania's First Division.
