= Bosnia and Herzegovina national under-18 football team =

Bosnia and Herzegovina
- Nickname(s): Zmajevi (Dragons); Zlatni Ljiljani (Golden Lilies)
- Association: Football Federation of Bosnia and Herzegovina
- Confederation: UEFA (Europe)
- Head coach: Dubravko Orlović
- FIFA code: BIH
First colours	Second colours

The Bosnia and Herzegovina national under-18 football team represents Bosnia and Herzegovina in international football matches at this age level.

== Competitive record ==
=== UEFA European U18 Championship ===
UEFA European U18 Championship Record									Qualification Record						
Year	Round	Pld	W	D	L	GF	GA	GD	Pld	W	D	L	GF	GA	GD
(Cyprus) 1998	Did not qualify								3	0	0	3	0	9	−9
(Sweden) 1999	Did not qualify								4	2	0	2	8	9	−1
(Germany) 2000	Did not qualify								3	1	1	1	4	4	=0
(Finland) 2001	Did not qualify								3	0	0	3	1	10	−9
Total	0/4	0	0	0	0	0	0	0	13	3	1	9	13	32	−19

== Current squad ==
The following players were called up for Friendly game against Hungary.

No.	Pos.	Player	Date of birth (age)	Caps	Goals	Club
	GK	Dino Kaiser	9 February 2007 (age 19)	0	0	(The Football Association) Fulham
	GK	Adin Aleta	13 July 2007 (age 19)	0	0	(Football Association of Bosnia and Herzegovina) Radnik Hadžići
	DF	Jusuf Terzić	27 March 2007 (age 19)	1	0	(Football Association of Bosnia and Herzegovina) Borac Banja Luka
	DF	Ivan Kraljević	13 April 2007 (age 19)	0	0	(Football Association of Bosnia and Herzegovina) Široki Brijeg
	DF	Hamza Redžić	9 June 2007 (age 19)	0	0	(Football Association of Bosnia and Herzegovina) Sloboda Tuzla
	DF	Roko Landeka	14 June 2007 (age 19)	0	0	(Croatian Football Federation) Dinamo Zagreb
	DF	Darko Bašić	9 July 2007 (age 19)	0	0	(Football Association of Bosnia and Herzegovina) Zrinjski Mostar
	DF	Petar Đukanović	23 July 2007 (age 19)	0	0	(Football Association of Bosnia and Herzegovina) Zvijezda 09
	DF	Amar Hadžimuratović	14 March 2008 (age 18)	0	0	(Austrian Football Association) Rapid Wien
	MF	Daris Čatak	1 January 2007 (age 19)	0	0	(Danish Football Association) Midtjylland
	MF	Malik Kolić	4 January 2007 (age 19)	0	0	(Football Association of Bosnia and Herzegovina) Željezničar
	MF	Ante Pokrajčić	17 March 2007 (age 19)	0	0	(Football Association of Bosnia and Herzegovina) Zrinjski Mostar
	MF	Admir Gojak	August 19, 2007 (age 19)	0	0	(German Football Association) Ingolstadt 04
	MF	Afan Fočo	19 October 2007 (age 19)	0	0	(Football Association of Bosnia and Herzegovina) Željezničar
	MF	Emin Pajić	November 20, 2007 (age 18)	0	0	(Norwegian Football Federation) Vålerenga
	MF	Božidar Dimitrić	11 March 2008 (age 18)	0	0	(Football Association of Bosnia and Herzegovina) Radnik Bijeljina
	FW	Senad Ćosić	January 11, 2007 (age 19)	0	0	(Swiss Football Association) Neuchâtel Xamax
	FW	Mahir Bešić	27 March 2007 (age 19)	0	0	(Football Association of Bosnia and Herzegovina) Velež Mostar
	FW	Antonio Arapović	24 April 2007 (age 19)	0	0	(Football Association of Bosnia and Herzegovina) Zrinjski Mostar
	FW	Matej Deket	1 October 2009 (age 17)	0	0	(Football Association of Bosnia and Herzegovina) Borac Banja Luka

=== Recent call-ups ===
The following eligible players have been called up for the team within the last twelve months:

Pos.	Player	Date of birth (age)	Caps	Goals	Club	Latest call-up
^{INJ} Withdrawn due to injury.^{PRE} Preliminary squad.^{SUS} Suspended.^{WD} Withdrew.

== See also ==
- European Under-18 Football Championship
- Bosnia and Herzegovina national football team
- Bosnia and Herzegovina national under-21 football team
- Bosnia and Herzegovina national under-19 football team
- Bosnia and Herzegovina national under-17 football team
- Bosnia and Herzegovina national under-15 football team
- Bosnia and Herzegovina women's national football team
