= Arjon Mustafa =

Albanian footballer

Personal information
- Full name: Arjon Mustafa
- Date of birth: 29 January 1980 (age 46)
- Place of birth: Shkodër, PSR Albania
- Position: Goalkeeper

Youth career
- Vllaznia Shkodër

Senior career*
Years	Team	Apps	(Gls)
1998–2003	Vllaznia	55	(0)
2002	→ Lushnja (loan)	0	(0)
2003–2004	Elbasani		
2004–2005	Partizani	9	(0)
2005–2006	Skënderbeu	33	(0)
2006–2007	Besa	19	(0)
2007–2010	Kastrioti	52	(0)
2010	Partizani	11	(0)
2010–2011	Kamza	5	(0)
2011-2012	Partizani	0	(0)
2011-2012	Tirana	0	(0)
- * Club domestic league appearances and goals as of 29 October 2010

Arjon Mustafa (born 29 January 1980) is an Albanian retired footballer who played as a goalkeeper.

== Honours ==
=== Vllaznia ===
- Albanian Superliga (2): 1997–98, 2000–2001
- Albanian Supercup (2): 1998, 2001
