= 1990 UEFA European Under-18 Championship =

1990-es U18-as labdarúgó-Európa-bajnokság

Tournament details
- Host country: Hungary
- Dates: 24–29 July
- Teams: 8

Final positions
- Champions: Soviet Union (6th title)
- Runners-up: Portugal
- Third place: Spain
- Fourth place: England

Tournament statistics
- Matches played: 10
- Goals scored: 25 (2.5 per match)

The 1990 UEFA European Under-18 Championship final tournament was held in Hungary. It also served as the European qualification for the 1991 FIFA World Youth Championship. Players born on or after 1 August 1971 were eligible to participate in this competition.

== Teams ==
The following teams qualified for the tournament:

- Belgium
- England
- Hungary (host, but still qualified)
- Portugal
- Republic of Ireland
- Soviet Union
- Spain
- Sweden

== Quarter-finals ==
24 July 1990

England	1–1	Belgium
Penalties
	5–4

Nyíregyháza
Referee: Gerhard Kapl (Austria)

24 July 1990

Soviet Union	3–0	Sweden

Debrecen
Referee: Serge Muhmenthaler (Switzerland)

24 July 1990

Portugal	1–1	Hungary
Torres 47'		Szabados 44'
Penalties
J. Costa (penalty scored); Pilar (penalty scored); Figo (penalty scored)	3–1	(penalty scored) Halmai

Békéscsaba
Referee: Pierluigi Pairetto (Italy)

24 July 1990

Spain	3–0	Republic of Ireland
Manolo 62'; Cuéllar 67' (pen.); Alfonso 86'

Gyula
Referee: Lube Spassov (Bulgaria)

== Semi-finals ==
=== Places 5–8 ===
26 July 1990

Sweden	6–0	Belgium

Nyíregyháza
Referee: Sadik Deda (Turkey)
26 July 1990

Republic of Ireland	1–0	Hungary

Szarvas
Referee: Dusan Colic (Yugoslavia)

=== Places 1–4 ===
26 July 1990

Spain	1–2	Portugal
Alfonso 40'		J. Pinto 35'; Figo 45'

Gyula
Referee: Lube Spassov (Bulgaria)

26 July 1990

Soviet Union	3–1	England

Debrecen
Referee: Pierluigi Pairetto (Italy)

== Third place match ==
29 July 1990

Spain	1–0	England
Cuéllar 12'

Békéscsaba
Referee: Serge Muhmenthaler (Switzerland)

== Final ==
29 July 1990

Soviet Union	0–0	Portugal
Penalties
Pokhlebaev (penalty scored); Kandaurov (penalty scored); Loukine (penalty scored); Sharan (penalty scored)	4–2	(penalty missed) Bento; (penalty scored) Figo; (penalty scored) Xavier

Békéscsaba
Referee: Gerhard Kapl (Austria)

1990 UEFA European Under-18 Championship

Soviet Union
Sixth title

== Qualification to World Youth Championship ==
The six best performing teams qualified for the 1991 FIFA World Youth Championship.

- England
- Portugal (host)
- Republic of Ireland
- Soviet Union
- Spain
- Sweden

== See also ==
- 1990 UEFA European Under-18 Championship qualifying
