= Artur Lekbello (footballer, born 1966) =

Albanian footballer

Personal information
- Full name: Artur Tushe Lekbello
- Date of birth: 23 February 1966 (age 60)
- Place of birth: Tirana, Albania
- Height: 1.83 m (6 ft 0 in)
- Position: Midfielder

Senior career*
| Years | Team | Apps | (Gls) |
| 1986–1991 | 17 Nëntori Tirana | | |
| 1991–1998 | Aris | 135 | (3) |

International career
| 1987–1996 | Albania | 30 | (0) |

Managerial career
- 2012: Tirana
- * Club domestic league appearances and goals

Artur Lekbello (born 23 February 1966) is an Albanian retired footballer who played as a midfielder. His nickname, Tushe, is a short form of his first name.

== Club career ==
Lekbello played for Nëntori Tirana and left communist Albania in 1991, joining Greek side Aris alongside fellow Nëntori and national team midfielder Mirel Josa.

== International career ==
He made his debut for Albania in an October 1987 European Championship qualification match against Romania and earned a total of 30 caps, scoring no goals. His final international was an October 1996 FIFA World Cup qualification match against Portugal.

== Managerial career ==
On 15 September 2012, Lekbello was named the new manager of Tirana, replacing the Spaniard Julián Rubio. Three days later, he officially signed the contract with the club whom he started his professional career. However, he resigned from the post later on 29 October following the poor results in the last four league matches.

== Personal life ==
Lekbello is married and has 2 children. In 2012, he was diagnosed with a rare muscle disease, which doctors told him that he had not more than 3 years to live. In an interview on 13 May 2017, Lekbello stated that the disease is called "Muscle scarcity", which starts from hands or legs. After his illness was made public in the Greek media, it was reported that a friendly match will be played on 17 May between the veterans of Aris Thessaloniki and Greece players that won the UEFA Euro 2004 to raise money for the treatment of the disease.

== Honours ==
- Albanian Superliga: 1987–88, 1988–89
