= 1997 UEFA European Under-18 Championship =

1997 UEFA Evrópu Undir 18 ára Meistaramótinu

Tournament details
- Host country: Iceland
- Dates: 24–31 July
- Teams: 8

Final positions
- Champions: France (4th title)
- Runners-up: Portugal
- Third place: Spain
- Fourth place: Republic of Ireland

Tournament statistics
- Matches played: 14
- Goals scored: 32 (2.29 per match)

The 1997 UEFA European Under-18 Championship Final Tournament was held in Iceland. Players born on or after 1 August 1978 were eligible to participate in this competition.

== Teams ==
The following teams qualified for the tournament:

- France
- Hungary
- Iceland (host)
- Israel
- Portugal
- Republic of Ireland
- Spain
- Switzerland

== Group stage ==
=== Group A ===
Teams	Pld	W	D	L	GF	GA	GD	Pts
Portugal	3	3	0	0	5	0	+5	9
Spain	3	1	1	1	3	4	–1	4
Iceland	3	0	2	1	3	4	–1	2
Hungary	3	0	1	2	3	6	–3	1

24 July 1997
18:00

Portugal	2–0	Hungary
Cordeiro 12'; Farkas 34' (o.g.)	Report

Referee: Milan Mitrovic (Slovenia)
24 July 1997

Spain	1–1	Iceland

Referee: Edgar Steinborn (Germany)

26 July 1997
16:00

Portugal	1–0	Iceland
Simão 60' (pen.)	Report

Referee: Luc Huyghe (Belgium)
26 July 1997

Spain	2–1	Hungary

Referee: Fritz Stuchlik (Austria)

28 July 1997
18:00

Iceland	2–2	Hungary

Referee: Miroslaw Radoman (Yugoslavia)
28 July 1997
18:00

Portugal	2–0	Spain
Rego 26'; Costa 71'	Report

Referee: Fiorenzo Treossi (Italy)

=== Group B ===
Teams	Pld	W	D	L	GF	GA	GD	Pts
France	3	3	0	0	6	2	+4	9
Republic of Ireland	3	1	1	1	4	4	0	4
Switzerland	3	1	0	2	3	2	+1	3
Israel	3	0	1	2	1	6	–5	1

24 July	France	3–2	Republic of Ireland
	Switzerland	3–0	Israel
26 July	France	2–0	Israel
	Republic of Ireland	1–0	Switzerland
28 July	France	1–0	Switzerland
	Republic of Ireland	1–1	Israel

== Third place match ==
31 July 1997

Spain	2 – 1	Republic of Ireland
Bermejo 7'; Ferrón 17'	Report	Sadlier 6'

Hafnarfjördur
Referee: Edgar Steinborn (Germany)

== Final ==
31 July 1997

France	1–0 (a.e.t.)	Portugal
Saha 95'	Report

Laugardalsvöllur, Reykjavík
Referee: Fiorenzo Treossi (Italy)

1997 UEFA European Under-18 Championship

France
Fourth title

== See also ==
- 1997 UEFA European Under-18 Championship qualifying
