= 2000 UEFA European Under-18 Championship =

U-18-Fußball-Europameisterschaft 2000

Tournament details
- Host country: Germany
- Dates: 17–24 July
- Teams: 8

Final positions
- Champions: France (5th title)
- Runners-up: Ukraine
- Third place: Germany
- Fourth place: Czech Republic

Tournament statistics
- Matches played: 14
- Goals scored: 35 (2.5 per match)

The 2000 UEFA European Under-18 Championship was held in Germany. Players born on or after 1 January 1981, were eligible to participate in this competition. The tournament also served as the European qualification for the 2001 FIFA World Youth Championship.

== Teams ==
- Croatia
- Czech Republic
- Finland
- France
- Germany (host)
- Netherlands
- Russia
- Ukraine

== Results ==
=== Group stage ===
==== Group A ====
Teams	Pld	W	D	L	GF	GA	GD	Pts
Ukraine	3	2	1	0	3	1	+2	7
Germany	3	2	0	1	6	3	+3	6
Netherlands	3	1	1	1	3	3	0	4
Croatia	3	0	0	3	3	8	-5	0

17 July 2000

Germany	0–1	Ukraine
	Report	Byelik 63'

Carl-Benz-Stadion, Mannheim
Referee: Tom Henning Øvrebø (Norway)
17 July 2000

Netherlands	3–0	Croatia
Houwing 23'; Hersi 47'; de Visscher 62'

Ludwig-Jahn-Stadion, Ludwigsburg
Referee: Orhan Erdemir (Turkey)

19 July 2000

Germany	3–0	Netherlands
Balitsch 36'; Lauth 75'; Auer 80'

Frankenstadion, Heilbronn
Referee: Mike Riley (England)
19 July 2000

Ukraine	2–1	Croatia
Byelik 40'; Bondarenko 76'		Babić 44'

Forst
Referee: Manuel Mejuto González (Spain)

21 July 2000

Croatia	2–3	Germany
Babić 46'; Srna 47'		Auer 16'; Preuß 74'; Jungnickel 82'

Waldau-Stadion, Stuttgart
Referee: Paulo Paraty da Silva (Portugal)
21 July 2000

Netherlands	0–0	Ukraine

Sinsheim
Referee: Carlos Amarilla (Paraguay)

==== Group B ====
Teams	Pld	W	D	L	GF	GA	GD	Pts
France	3	2	0	1	4	2	+2	6
Czech Republic	3	1	1	1	4	4	0	4
Finland	3	1	1	1	5	5	0	4
Russia	3	0	2	1	2	4	-2	2

17 July 2000

Czech Republic	1–1	Russia
Macek 60' (pen.)	Report	Shchipkov 66'

Rosenaustadion, Augsburg
Attendance: 3,000
Referee: Carlos Amarilla (Paraguay)
17 July 2000

France	1–2	Finland
Ahamada 24'		Forssell 53', 70'

Sportpark Ansbach, Ansbach
Referee: Manuel Mejuto González (Spain)

19 July 2000

Czech Republic	0–1	France
	Report	Mathis 10'

Stadion im Stauferpark, Donauwörth
Attendance: 4,000
Referee: Paulo Paraty da Silva (Portugal)
19 July 2000

Russia	1–1	Finland
Romanov 75'		Forssell 13'

Stadion am Berufsschulzentrum, Schwäbisch Gmünd
Referee: Orhan Erdemir (Turkey)

21 July 2000

Finland	2–3	Czech Republic
Bureš 48' (o.g.); Sjölund 73'	Report	Macek 53' (pen.); Baroš 57'; Kobylík 63'

Rieser Sportpark, Nördlingen
Attendance: 4,100
Referee: Tom Henning Øvrebø (Norway)
21 July 2000

France	2–0	Russia
Givet 73'; Mathis 84'

Schwabenstadion, Gundelfingen
Referee: Mike Riley (England)

== Third place play-off ==
23 July 2000

Germany	3–1	Czech Republic
Gemiti 48'; Auer 63' (pen.); Jungnickel 69'	Report	Baroš 3'

Landkreisstadion, Aichach
Attendance: 3,900
Referee: Tom Henning Øvrebø (Norway)

== Final ==
24 July 2000

France	1–0	Ukraine
Bugnet 81'	Report

Frankenstadion, Nuremberg
Attendance: 32,000
Referee: Orhan Erdemir (Turkey)

2000 UEFA U-18 Championship winner

France
Fifth title

== Qualification to World Youth Championship ==
The six best performing teams qualified for the 2001 FIFA World Youth Championship.

- Czech Republic
- Finland
- France
- Germany
- Netherlands
- Ukraine

== See also ==
- 2000 UEFA European Under-18 Championship qualifying
