= Latvia national under-18 football team =

Latvia Under-18/Lettland U18s
- Association: Latvian Football Federation
- Confederation: UEFA (Europe)
- Most caps: Igors Barinovs (9)
- Top scorer: Valerijs Sabala (1)
- FIFA code: LVA
First colours	Second colours

FIFA ranking
- Current: 116

The Latvia national under-18 football team are a feeder team for the main Latvia national football team.

== See also ==
- Latvia national football team
- Latvia national under-21 football team
- Latvia national under-19 football team
- Latvia national under-17 football team
