= 1999 UEFA European Under-18 Championship =

1999 U18-Europamästerskapet i fotboll

Tournament details
- Host country: Sweden
- Dates: 18–26 July
- Teams: 8

Final positions
- Champions: Portugal (3rd title)
- Runners-up: Italy
- Third place: Republic of Ireland
- Fourth place: Greece

Tournament statistics
- Matches played: 14
- Goals scored: 33 (2.36 per match)

The UEFA European Under-18 Championship 1999 Final Tournament was held in Sweden. Players born on or after 1 January 1980 were eligible to participate in this competition.

== Teams ==
The following teams qualified for the tournament:

- France
- Georgia
- Greece
- Italy
- Portugal
- Republic of Ireland
- Spain
- Sweden (host)

== Group stage ==
=== Group A ===
Teams	Pld	W	D	L	GF	GA	GD	Pts
Portugal	3	2	1	0	4	1	+3	7
Greece	3	0	3	0	2	2	0	3
France	3	0	2	1	1	2	–1	2
Sweden	3	0	2	1	2	4	–2	2

18 July	Portugal	0–0	Greece
	Sweden	0–0	France
20 July	France	1–1	Greece
	Sweden	1–3	Portugal
22 July	France	0–1	Portugal
	Greece	1–1	Sweden

=== Group B ===
Ireland beats Spain in this group based on

Teams	Pld	W	D	L	GF	GA	GD	Pts
Italy	3	2	1	0	7	3	+4	7
Republic of Ireland	3	1	1	1	4	5	–1	4
Spain	3	1	1	1	7	5	+2	4
Georgia	3	0	1	2	4	9	–5	1

19 July	Italy	2–0	Georgia
	Spain	0–1	Republic of Ireland
21 July	Republic of Ireland	3–3	Georgia
	Spain	3–3	Italy
23 July	Georgia	1–4	Spain
	Republic of Ireland	0–2	Italy

== Third place match ==
25 July 1999

Greece	0 – 1	Republic of Ireland

Linköping
Referee: Lubomir Pucek (Czech Republic)

== Final ==
26 July 1999

Portugal	1 – 0	Italy
Pinto 33'

Idrottsparken, Norrköping
Referee: Costas Kapitanis (Cyprus)

1999 UEFA European Under-18 Championship

Portugal
Third title

== See also ==
- 1999 UEFA European Under-18 Championship qualifying
