= Azerbaijan national under-18 football team =

Azerbaijan U18
- Confederation: UEFA (Europe)
- Head coach: Fizuli Mammadov
- Most caps: Kamran Agayev
- Top scorer: Karim Diniyev
- FIFA code: AZE
First colours	Second colours

The Azerbaijan national under-18 football team are a feeder team for the main Azerbaijan national football team. The team is controlled by the AFFA.

In addition to participating in international tournaments, the team played in the Azerbaijani Championship in the 1996–97 and 1997–98 seasons.

== Current squad ==
The Azerbaijan under-18 national team had a training camp on 4–19 January 2018 in Baku. The following players were called up for the training process:

No.	Pos.	Player	Date of birth (age)	Caps	Goals	Club
	GK	Aykhan Arazli	29 March 2001 (age 25)			(Association of Football Federations of Azerbaijan) Qarabağ
	GK	Elmaddin Sultanov	7 May 2001 (age 25)			(Association of Football Federations of Azerbaijan) Gabala
	GK	Abbas Abbasov	11 May 2001 (age 25)			(Association of Football Federations of Azerbaijan) Neftçi
	DF	Murad Mammadov	2 May 2001 (age 25)			(Association of Football Federations of Azerbaijan) Sabail
	DF	Khayal Muradov	6 April 2001 (age 25)			(Association of Football Federations of Azerbaijan) Gabala
	DF	Javidan Rahimli	19 January 2001 (age 25)			(Association of Football Federations of Azerbaijan) Gabala
	DF	Zamig Aliyev	5 May 2001 (age 25)			(Association of Football Federations of Azerbaijan) Qarabağ
	DF	Mehdi Tahirov	9 October 2001 (age 25)			(Association of Football Federations of Azerbaijan) Neftçi
	DF	Ilgar Burjaliyev	11 March 2001 (age 25)			(Association of Football Federations of Azerbaijan) Zira
	DF	Farid Soltanzade	24 February 2001 (age 25)			(Association of Football Federations of Azerbaijan) Kapaz
	DF	Nijat Aliyev	24 September 2001 (age 25)			(Association of Football Federations of Azerbaijan) Gabala
	DF	Nihat Guliyev	19 July 2001 (age 25)			(Association of Football Federations of Azerbaijan) Qarabağ
	DF	Khanlar Nasibov	31 March 2001 (age 25)			(Association of Football Federations of Azerbaijan) Zira
	DF	Idris Ingilabli	10 June 2001 (age 25)			(Association of Football Federations of Azerbaijan) Gabala
	MF	Vusal Asgarov	23 August 2001 (age 25)			(Association of Football Federations of Azerbaijan) NNeftçi
	MF	Ismayil Zulfugarli	16 April 2001 (age 25)			(Association of Football Federations of Azerbaijan) Neftçi
	MF	Rufat Abdullazade	17 January 2001 (age 25)			(Association of Football Federations of Azerbaijan) Sumgayit
	MF	Vugar Guliyev	18 February 2001 (age 25)			(Association of Football Federations of Azerbaijan) Neftçi
	MF	Salman Alasgarov	9 June 2001 (age 25)			(Association of Football Federations of Azerbaijan) Gabala
	MF	Orkhan Abdullayev	21 March 2001 (age 25)			(Association of Football Federations of Azerbaijan) Gabala
	MF	Kenan Hashimov	27 May 2001 (age 25)			(Association of Football Federations of Azerbaijan) Qarabağ
	MF	Ali Mursalov	21 March 2001 (age 25)			(Association of Football Federations of Azerbaijan) Gabala
	MF	Jeyhun Nuriyev	30 March 2001 (age 25)			(Association of Football Federations of Azerbaijan) Keşla
	FW	Mahammad Maharramov	1 August 2001 (age 25)			(Association of Football Federations of Azerbaijan) Gabala
	FW	Nijat Musayev	15 January 2001 (age 25)			(Association of Football Federations of Azerbaijan) Neftchi Baku
	FW	Asef Aliyev	26 February 2001 (age 25)			(Association of Football Federations of Azerbaijan) Sumgayit

== See also ==
- Azerbaijan national football team
- Azerbaijan national under-23 football team
- Azerbaijan national under-21 football team
- Azerbaijan national under-20 football team
- Azerbaijan national under-19 football team
- Azerbaijan national under-17 football team
