= Lithuania national under-18 football team =

Lithuania Under-18
- Association: Lietuvos futbolo federacija (LFF)
- Confederation: UEFA (Europe)
- Head coach: (Lithuania) Tomas Ražanauskas
- FIFA code: LTU
First colours	Second colours

The Lithuania national under-18 football team is a feeder team for the main Lithuania national football team.

== Summary ==
U18 team is not training continuously, it is rather assembled for specific tournaments, such as Valentin Granatkin memorial youth tournament in Saint Petersburg in 2013, ″Palangos Juzės″ tournament in 2014 in Palanga, Development Cup 2016 in Minsk, and "The Friendship Cup" in 2019 in Birštonas. The U-18 team was not called up in 2020 and 2021, active national teams were U17, U19 and U21, participating in corresponding UEFA youth championships. In March 2022 a call-up to an U-18 training camp was announced.

== Squad ==
The following players were called up to a training camp in Kaunas on 7–9 March 2022.

No.	Pos.	Player	Date of birth (age)	Caps	Goals	Club
	GK	Kristupas Džekčioras	24 January 2005 (age 21)			(Lithuanian Football Federation) FM Ateitis
	GK	Dovas Elzbergas	29 March 2005 (age 21)			(Lithuanian Football Federation) FK Žalgiris
	GK	Klaidas Laukžemis	16 March 2005 (age 21)			(Lithuanian Football Federation) FK Žalgiris
	GK	Jurgis Mikšiūnas	22 April 2005 (age 21)			(Lithuanian Football Federation) FK Žalgiris
	DF	Vykintas Bazys	16 January 2005 (age 21)			(Lithuanian Football Federation) FK Žalgiris
	DF	Gabrielius Marcos Buslys	14 July 2005 (age 21)			(Lithuanian Football Federation) FK Kauno Žalgiris
	DF	Matas Jakubauskas	14 July 2005 (age 21)			(Lithuanian Football Federation) FK Kauno Žalgiris
	DF	Ignas Paulikas	18 April 2005 (age 21)			(Lithuanian Football Federation) FK BFA
	DF	Milanas Rutkovskis	3 July 2005 (age 21)			(Lithuanian Football Federation) FM Ateitis
	DF	Arminas Soja	4 August 2005 (age 21)			(Lithuanian Football Federation) FK Žalgiris
	DF	Aidas Šidlauskas	30 August 2005 (age 21)			(Lithuanian Football Federation) FK BFA
	DF	Nojus Žitkauskas	31 January 2005 (age 21)			(Lithuanian Football Federation) FK Kauno Žalgiris
	MF	Nojus Grudis	11 March 2005 (age 21)			(Lithuanian Football Federation) Be1
	MF	Nedas Klimavičius	10 February 2005 (age 21)			(Lithuanian Football Federation) FK Žalgiris
	MF	Artiomas Kočerga	1 October 2005 (age 21)			(Lithuanian Football Federation) FM Ateitis
	MF	Titas Milius	7 April 2005 (age 21)			(Lithuanian Football Federation) FK Kauno Žalgiris
	MF	Matas Miškinis	12 October 2005 (age 21)			(Lithuanian Football Federation) FK Sūduva
	MF	Juozas Radavičius	29 December 2005 (age 20)			(Lithuanian Football Federation) FA Šiauliai
	MF	Tomas Stelmokas	29 July 2005 (age 21)			(Lithuanian Football Federation) FK Kauno Žalgiris
	DF	Martynas Šetkus	7 October 2005 (age 21)			(Lithuanian Football Federation) FK Žalgiris
	MF	Aironas Trakšelis	25 January 2005 (age 21)			(Lithuanian Football Federation) FK Panevėžys
	MF	Nidas Vosylius	15 July 2005 (age 21)			(Lithuanian Football Federation) FK Kauno Žalgiris
	FW	Romualdas Jansonas	23 June 2005 (age 21)			(Lithuanian Football Federation) FK Žalgiris
	FW	Giedrius Onuškevičius	21 January 2005 (age 21)			(Lithuanian Football Federation) FM Ateitis

Players called up to Lithuania U18 squad on 7 January 2013 for a friendly match against Ukraine U18s.
No.	Pos.	Player	Date of birth (age)	Caps	Goals	Club
1	GK	Marius Suvaizdis	22 February 1995 (age 31)	3	0	(German Football Association) Würzburger Kickers U19
	DF	Julius Aleksandravičius	13 January 1995 (age 31)	12	0	(German Football Association) Chemnitzer FC U19
	DF	Rolandas Baravykas	23 August 1995 (age 31)	1	0	(Lithuanian Football Federation) Atlantas Klaipėda
	DF	Lukas Pangonis	25 August 1995 (age 31)	1	0	(Lithuanian Football Federation) Nacionaline futbolo Akademija
	DF	Lukas Pupšys	19 July 1996 (age 30)	4	1	(Lithuanian Football Federation) Nacionaline futbolo Akademija
	DF	Justas Raziūnas	23 January 1995 (age 31)	1	0	(Lithuanian Football Federation) FK Šiauliai
	DF	Julius Meistininkas	21 June 1995 (age 31)	1	0	(Lithuanian Football Federation) Tauras Tauragė
	DF	Benas Spietinis	15 February 1996 (age 30)	1	0	(Lithuanian Football Federation) Jonavos FM
	MF	Lukas Ankudinovas	10 August 1995 (age 31)	1	0	(Lithuanian Football Federation) Tauras Tauragė
	MF	Tadas Lekeckas	24 July 1995 (age 31)	1	0	(Lithuanian Football Federation) Sūduva Marijampolė
	MF	Aivaras Meškinis	13 November 1995 (age 30)	1	0	(Lithuanian Football Federation) Ekranas Panevėžys U19
	MF	Gabrielius Judickas	4 July 1995 (age 31)	1	0	(Lithuanian Football Federation) Nacionaline futbolo akademija
	MF	Domantas Šimkus	10 February 1996 (age 30)	1	0	(Lithuanian Football Federation) Nacionaline futbolo akademija
	MF	Eimantas Noreikis	14 November 1998 (age 27)	1	0	(The Football Association) Southampton FC
	FW	Darius Kazubovicius	19 February 1995 (age 31)	1	0	(Lithuanian Football Federation) FK Granitas
	FW	Donatas Stulga	22 August 1995 (age 31)	1	0	(Lithuanian Football Federation) FK Spyris Kaunas
	FW	Donatas Šėgžda	16 January 1996 (age 30)	1	0	(Lithuanian Football Federation) Nacionaline futbolo akademija
