= Wales national under-18 football team =

National under 18 association football team

Wales Under-18
- Nickname: Young Dragons (Welsh: Dreigiau Ifanc)
- Association: Football Association of Wales
- Head coach: Neil Taylor
First colours	Second colours

The Wales national under-18 football team is the national under-18 football team of Wales and is controlled by the Football Association of Wales.

== Current squad ==
Players born on or after 1 January 2009 are eligible.

The following player were called up for a double-header of friendlies against Finland on 3 and 5 October 2026.

Caps and goals correct as of 5 October 2026, after the match against Finland.

No.	Pos.	Player	Date of birth (age)	Caps	Goals	Club
1	GK	Alex Cross	4 October 2009 (age 17)	1	0	(Football Association of Wales) Cardiff City
12	GK	Charlie Bell		1	0	(Football Association of Wales) Cardiff City
2	DF	Alfie Walker	3 September 2009 (age 17)	2	0	(The Football Association) Leeds United
3	DF	Ashton Williams	13 May 2009 (age 17)	2	0	(The Football Association) Wolverhampton Wanderers
4	DF	Theo Pitt	5 September 2009 (age 17)	2	0	(The Football Association) Blackburn Rovers
5	DF	Finley Evans	30 January 2009 (age 17)	2	0	(The Football Association) Luton Town
14	DF	Louie Evans	24 March 2009 (age 17)	2	0	(The Football Association) Bolton Wanderers
17	DF	George Robinson	29 October 2009 (age 17)	2	0	(The Football Association) Southampton
18	DF	Logan Cartwright	8 May 2009 (age 17)	2	0	(Football Association of Wales) Cardiff City
6	MF	Isaac Thomas	3 September 2009 (age 17)	2	0	(The Football Association) West Ham United
8	MF	Alfie Jones	15 May 2009 (age 17)	2	0	(Football Association of Wales) Swansea City
11	MF	Jacob Norris	29 December 2009 (age 16)	2	0	(Football Association of Wales) Cardiff City
15	MF	Dafi-Tomos Pemberton	4 May 2010 (age 16)	1	0	(The Football Association) Everton
19	MF	Brodie Jones		2	0	(The Football Association) Nottingham Forest
7	FW	Ollie Salter	10 August 2009 (age 17)	2	0	(The Football Association) Tottenham Hotspur
9	FW	Leo Papirnyk	23 July 2009 (age 17)	2	1	(Football Association of Wales) Cardiff City
10	FW	Zac Scrivens		2	0	(The Football Association) Fleetwood Town
16	FW	Keano Conaty	27 October 2009 (age 17)	2	0	(Football Association of Wales) Cardiff City
20	FW	Archie Lorimer	3 November 2009 (age 17)	2	0	(The Football Association) Burnley
22	FW	Jac Jones	29 April 2009 (age 17)	2	1	(Football Association of Wales) Wrexham

== See also ==
- Football Association of Wales
- Wales national football team
- Wales national under-21 football team
- Wales national under-20 football team
- Wales national under-19 football team
- Wales national under-17 football team
