= Luxembourg national under-19 football team =

Men's national U-17 association football team

- Association: Luxembourg Football Federation (Fédération Luxembourgeoise de Football)
- Confederation: UEFA (Europe)
- Head coach: Nedim Jasarovic
- FIFA code: LUX
| First colours | Second colours | Third colours |

UEFA U-19 European Championship
- Appearances: 0

The Luxembourg national under-19 football team is the national under-19 football team of Luxembourg and is controlled by the Luxembourg Football Federation. The team competes in the UEFA European Under-19 Football Championship, held every year.

== Players ==
=== Latest squad ===
The following players were called up for 2027 UEFA European Under-19 Championship qualification fixtures against Albania, Norway, and Malta between 25 and 31 March 2026.

| No. | Pos. | Player | Date of birth (age) | Club |
|---|---|---|---|---|
| | GK | Nayan Campos | 7 July 2008 (age 18) | (Luxembourg Football Federation) Käerjeng 97 |
| | GK | Dzenis Novalić | 28 November 2008 (age 17) | (Luxembourg Football Federation) F91 Dudelange |
| | DF | Mylan Oger | 5 May 2008 (age 18) | (Luxembourg Football Federation) Progrès Niederkorn |
| | DF | Lohan Monteiro Ruiz | 31 July 2008 (age 18) | (Luxembourg Football Federation) Alisontia Steinsel |
| | DF | Michel Chedid | 30 January 2008 (age 18) | (Royal Belgian Football Association) Standard Liège |
| | DF | Adriano de Oliveira Scholtes | 3 March 2008 (age 18) | (Luxembourg Football Federation) Bettembourg |
| | DF | Dinis Jordao Machado | 9 November 2008 (age 17) | (Luxembourg Football Federation) Käerjeng 97 |
| | DF | Mirza Rasiti | 21 February 2008 (age 18) | (Luxembourg Football Federation) Racing Union |
| | DF | Preston da Silva dos Paciencia | 30 November 2008 (age 17) | (Luxembourg Football Federation) Wiltz 71 |
| | DF | Mika Da Luz Garcia | 25 July 2008 (age 18) | (Luxembourg Football Federation) Racing Union |
| | DF | Edson Lima | 16 February 2008 (age 18) | (French Football Federation) Metz |
| | MF | Rodrigo Fernandes | 10 October 2008 (age 18) | (Luxembourg Football Federation) US Hostert |
| | MF | Alexandre Tavares dos Santos | 19 September 2008 (age 18) | (German Football Association) Mainz |
| | MF | Luca Carolei | 5 August 2008 (age 18) | (Luxembourg Football Federation) Käerjeng 97 |
| | MF | Kylian Batchakui | 28 April 2009 (age 17) | (German Football Association) Hoffenheim |
| | MF | Scott Welter | 2 January 2009 (age 17) | (German Football Association) Karlsruhe |
| | MF | Diogo Dos Santos Pereira | 31 January 2008 (age 18) | (German Football Association) Darmstadt |
| | FW | Hamza Kadamani | 13 September 2009 (age 17) | (French Football Federation) Metz |
| | FW | Jess Gomes Rodrigues | 9 February 2009 (age 17) | (French Football Federation) Metz |
| | FW | Jona Polfer | 1 June 2009 (age 17) | (German Football Association) Hoffenheim |

== See also ==
- Luxembourg national football team
- Luxembourg national under-21 football team
