= Bulgaria national under-18 football team =

National U-18 association football team

Bulgaria Under-18's
- Nickname: The Lions
- Association: Bulgarian Football Union
- Confederation: UEFA (Europe)
- Head coach: Angel Stoykov
- Captain: Nikolay Yankov
- FIFA code: BUL
First colours	Second colours

The Bulgaria national under-18 football team are a feeder team for the main Bulgaria national football team.

== Recent results ==
Win Draw Loss

== Players ==
=== Current squad ===
- The following players were called-up for the friendly matches.
- Match dates: 24 and 27 March 2023
- Opposition: Poland
- Caps and goals correct as of: 24 March 2023, after the match against Poland

No.	Pos.	Player	Date of birth (age)	Caps	Goals	Club
1	GK	Aleks Bozhev	19 July 2005 (age 21)	1	0	(Bulgarian Football Union) CSKA Sofia
12	GK	Velizar-Iliya Iliev	20 July 2005 (age 21)	0	0	(Italian Football Federation) Cagliari
2	DF	Lachezar Ivanov	2 June 2005 (age 21)	1	0	(Bulgarian Football Union) CSKA Sofia
3	DF	Rosen Bozhinov	23 January 2005 (age 21)	1	0	(Bulgarian Football Union) CSKA 1948 Sofia
4	DF	Simeon Vasilev	24 October 2005 (age 21)	1	0	(Bulgarian Football Union) CSKA 1948 Sofia
5	DF	Rosen Marinov	2 February 2005 (age 21)	1	0	(Bulgarian Football Union) CSKA Sofia
13	DF	Martin Georgiev	1 January 2005 (age 21)	0	0	(Bulgarian Football Union) Pirin Blagoevgrad
15	DF	Kostadin Tatarov	18 January 2005 (age 21)	1	0	(Bulgarian Football Union) Botev Plovdiv
16	DF	Dimitar Papazov	15 July 2006 (age 20)	1	0	(Bulgarian Football Union) Botev Plovdiv
6	MF	Viktor Vasilev	24 October 2005 (age 21)	0	0	(Bulgarian Football Union) CSKA 1948 Sofia
7	MF	Zahari Atanasov	31 January 2005 (age 21)	1	0	(Bulgarian Football Union) Septemvri Sofia
8	MF	Antoan Stoyanov	17 January 2005 (age 21)	1	0	(Bulgarian Football Union) Levski Sofia
10	MF	Vasil Hristov	5 December 2005 (age 20)	1	0	(Italian Football Federation) Torino
13	MF	Kubrat Onasci	6 July 2006 (age 20)	1	0	(Bulgarian Football Union) Septemvri Sofia
20	MF	Kristiyan Boychev	10 August 2005 (age 21)	1	0	(Bulgarian Football Union) CSKA 1948 Sofia
21	MF	Martin Draganov	8 May 2005 (age 21)	1	0	(Bulgarian Football Union) CSKA 1948 Sofia
9	FW	Kristiyan Velichkov	1 January 2006 (age 20)	1	0	(Bulgarian Football Union) Slavia Sofia
11	FW	Borislav Marinov	2 March 2005 (age 21)	1	1	(Bulgarian Football Union) Septemvri Sofia
14	FW	Konstantin Pavlov	14 August 2005 (age 21)	1	1	(Bulgarian Football Union) Botev Plovdiv
17	FW	Ilian Antonov	22 May 2005 (age 21)	1	0	(Bulgarian Football Union) CSKA Sofia
22	FW	Stefan Traykov	18 December 2005 (age 20)	1	0	(Bulgarian Football Union) Slavia Sofia

=== Recent call-ups ===
The following players have also been called up to the Bulgarian under-18's squad within the last 12 months and are still available for selection.

Pos.	Player	Date of birth (age)	Caps	Goals	Club	Latest call-up

== See also ==
- Bulgaria national football team
- Bulgaria national under-21 football team
- Bulgaria national under-19 football team
- Bulgaria national under-17 football team
