= Cyprus national under-18 football team =

Cyprus U18/Zypern U18
- Association: Cyprus Football Association
- Confederation: UEFA (Europe)
- Most caps: Antonis Georgallides (3)
- Top scorer: Dimitri Kyprianos (1)
- FIFA code: CYP

FIFA ranking
- Current: 123

The Cyprus national under-18 football team are a feeder team for the main Cyprus national football team.
