= Malta national under-19 football team =

National youth association football team

Malta Under 19
- Nickname: Knights of St John
- Association: Malta Football Association
- Confederation: UEFA (Europe)
- Head coach: FrancescoMacri
- FIFA code: MLT
First colours	Second colours

First international
- Malta 1–2 Italy (La Valletta, Malta; 8 December 1967)

Biggest win
- Liechtenstein 0–4 Malta (Schaan; 28 September 2026)

Biggest defeat
- East Germany 10–0 Malta (Halle, East Germany; 20 May 1969)

UEFA U-19 Championship
- Appearances: 4 (first in 1969)
- Best result: Group stage (4 times)

The Malta national under-19 football team represents Malta in association football at under-19 age level. It is controlled by the Malta Football Association.

== Players ==
Players born on or after 1 January 2008 are eligible.

=== Current squad ===
The following players were called up to the squad for the 2027 UEFA European Under-19 Championship qualification matches against Switzerland on 11 November, Northern Ireland on 14 November and North Macedonia on 17 November 2026.

Caps and goals correct as of 4 October 2026, after the match against Cyprus.

No.	Pos.	Player	Date of birth (age)	Caps	Goals	Club
	GK	Adam Newell	3 July 2008 (age 18)	5	0	(Malta Football Association) Pietà Hotspurs
	GK	Vincent Tabone	22 January 2009 (age 17)	2	0	(Swiss Football Association) Lausanne-Sport
	DF	Ben Gaerty	7 February 2008 (age 18)	7	1	(Malta Football Association) Tarxien Rainbows
	DF	Andreas Vella	4 February 2008 (age 18)	7	0	(Malta Football Association) Melita
	DF	Lydon Attard	21 May 2009 (age 17)	0	0	(Malta Football Association) Mosta
	DF	Sam Farrugia	10 March 2008 (age 18)	0	0	(Malta Football Association) Pietà Hotspurs
	MF	Zyas Newell	10 November 2008 (age 18)	5	2	(Malta Football Association) Floriana
	MF	Sami Aboassaf	3 December 2008 (age 17)	5	0	(Malta Football Association) Pietà Hotspurs
	MF	Scott Camilleri	24 March 2008 (age 18)	4	0	(Malta Football Association) Hamrun Spartans
	MF	Aeneas Farrugia	8 December 2008 (age 17)	4	0	(Malta Football Association) Mosta
	MF	Matteas Caruana	11 January 2008 (age 18)	2	0	(Malta Football Association) Dingli Swallows
	MF	Ryan Debono	7 July 2009 (age 17)	2	0	(Malta Football Association) Mosta
	MF	Daniel Pawley	27 July 2008 (age 18)	2	0	(Malta Football Association) Melita
	FW	Matteo Paolo Grech	15 November 2008 (age 18)	5	2	(Malta Football Association) Valletta
	FW	Gunner Elliott	18 July 2008 (age 18)	5	0	(The Football Association) Chesterfield
	FW	Sky Chetcuti	15 November 2008 (age 18)	4	0	(Malta Football Association) Valletta
	FW	Jaylen Zarb	18 June 2008 (age 18)	4	0	(The Football Association) Chesterfield
	FW	Denzel Attard	28 December 2009 (age 16)	0	0	(Malta Football Association) Floriana
	FW	Luca Baldacchino	13 August 2008 (age 18)	0	0	(Malta Football Association) St. Andrews

=== Recent call-ups ===
Pos.	Player	Date of birth (age)	Caps	Goals	Club	Latest call-up
GK	Jayden Farrugia	3 May 2008 (age 18)	1	0	(Malta) Mosta	v. Albania, 31 March 2026
DF	Ismael Vella	3 December 2008 (age 17)	3	0	(Malta) Pietà Hotspurs	v. Albania, 31 March 2026
DF	Benjamin Spiteri	8 April 2008 (age 18)	3	0	(Malta) San Ġwann	v. Albania, 31 March 2026
MF	Jack Camilleri	20 June 2008 (age 18)	8	1	(Malta) St. Andrews	v. Albania, 31 March 2026
MF	Luke Urpani	29 February 2008 (age 18)	3	0	(Malta) Mosta	v. Albania, 31 March 2026
MF	Ben Flavell		2	0	(England) Birmingham City	v. Albania, 31 March 2026
MF	Zaiden Formosa	1 March 2008 (age 18)	1	0	(Malta) Valletta	v. Albania, 31 March 2026
FW	Ethan Brincat Winters	10 October 2008 (age 18)	2	0	(Malta) St. Andrews	v. Albania, 31 March 2026
FW	Gianluca Cauchi	23 September 2008 (age 18)	1	0	(Malta) St. Andrews	v. Albania, 31 March 2026
