= 2014 UEFA European Under-19 Championship qualifying round =

2014 UEFA European Under-19 Championship qualification
Tournament details
- Dates: 6 September – 19 November 2013
- Teams: 52 (from 1 confederation)

Tournament statistics
- Matches played: 78
- Goals scored: 256 (3.28 per match)
- Top scorer: (Slovakia) Matúš Bero (5 goals)
- All statistics correct as of 19 November 2013.

The 2014 UEFA European Under-19 Championship qualifying round was the first round of the qualification for the 2014 UEFA European Under-19 Championship final tournament. A total of 52 participating teams were divided into 13 groups of 4 teams, with one of the teams hosting all six group matches in a single round-robin format. The 13 group winners, 13 group runners-up and the best third-placed team secured qualification for the elite round. Hungary qualified as hosts, while Spain received a bye to the elite round as the side with the highest competition coefficient. The draw for the qualifying round was held on 5 December 2012 in Nyon. Matches were played from 6 September to 19 November 2013.

== Seeding ==
A total of 52 participating teams were divided in two draw pots, based on the UEFA Under-19 coefficient ranking. Before the draw, UEFA confirmed that, for political reasons, Armenia and Azerbaijan would not host the mini-tournament if they were drawn in the same group, due to the dispute concerning the territory of Nagorno-Karabakh; the same rule applied for Georgia and Russia, due to the dispute regarding the territory of South Ossetia. The UEFA Executive Committee admitted Gibraltar as a provisional member of UEFA on 1 October 2012. A decision on the admission of the Gibraltar Football Association as a full member of UEFA was taken by the XXXVII Ordinary UEFA Congress in London in May 2013.

Pot A	Pot B
France; England; Greece; Portugal; Serbia; Croatia; Netherlands; Italy; Turkey; Belgium; Republic of Ireland; Germany; Ukraine; Czech Republic; Norway; Denmark; Austria; Romania; Switzerland; Slovakia; Scotland; Russia; Poland; Georgia; Bosnia and Herzegovina; Montenegro	Azerbaijan; Northern Ireland; Israel; Wales; Latvia; Estonia; Slovenia; Finland; Iceland; Armenia; Albania; Belarus; Bulgaria; Macedonia; Moldova; Cyprus; Faroe Islands; Lithuania; Sweden; Kazakhstan; Luxembourg; Malta; Andorra; San Marino; Liechtenstein; Gibraltar

== Tiebreakers ==
If two or more teams are equal on points on completion of the group matches, the following criteria are applied to determine the rankings.

1. Higher number of points obtained in the group matches played among the teams in question
2. Superior goal difference from the group matches played among the teams in question
3. Higher number of goals scored in the group matches played among the teams in question
4. If, after applying criteria 1) to 3) to several teams, two teams still have an equal ranking, the criteria 1) to 3) will be reapplied to determine the ranking of these teams. If this procedure does not lead to a decision, criteria 5) and 6) will apply
5. Results of all group matches:
  1. Superior goal difference
  2. Higher number of goals scored
6. Drawing of lots

Additionally, if two teams which have the same number of points and the same number of goals scored and conceded play their last group match against each other and are still equal at the end of that match, their final rankings are determined by the penalty shoot-out and not by the criteria listed above. This procedure is applicable only if a ranking of the teams is required to determine the group winner or the runners-up and the third-placed team.

== Groups ==
The hosts of the thirteen mini-tournament groups are indicated below in italics.

All times are CEST (UTC+02:00) until 26 October 2013 and CET (UTC+01:00) starting from 27 October 2013.

=== Group 1 ===
Pos	Team	Pld	W	D	L	GF	GA	GD	Pts	Qualification
1	Czech Republic (H)	3	3	0	0	10	1	+9	9	Elite round
2	Cyprus	3	1	1	1	10	6	+4	4	Elite round
3	Croatia	3	1	1	1	9	5	+4	4	
4	Gibraltar	3	0	0	3	0	17	−17	0	

(H) Hosts
17 October 2013
14:30

Croatia	7–0	Gibraltar
Jedvaj 41'; Pašalić 45+2'; Kolar 50', 62', 85'; Mujan 89'; Biljan 90+2'	Report

Městský stadion, Ostrava
Referee: Bardhyl Pashaj (Albania)
17 October 2013
17:00

Czech Republic	4–1	Cyprus
Mašek 7' (pen.), 9' (pen.); Matoušek 39'; Buchvaldek 90+4' (pen.)	Report	Makris 35'

Stadion v Městských sadech, Opava
Referee: Tamás Bognar (Hungary)

19 October 2013
14:30

Gibraltar	0–3	Czech Republic
	Report	Mašek 40'; Schick 47'; Buchvaldek 57'

Městský stadion, Ostrava
Referee: Bardhyl Pashaj (Albania)
19 October 2013
17:00

Croatia	2–2	Cyprus
Mujan 3'; Kolar 22'	Report	Makris 76', 90+5'

Stadion v Městských sadech, Opava
Referee: Anar Salmanov (Azerbaijan)

22 October 2013
17:00

Czech Republic	3–0	Croatia
Sodoma 1'; Vichta 17'; Mašek 22'	Report

Stadion v Městských sadech, Opava
Referee: Anar Salmanov (Azerbaijan)
22 October 2013
17:00

Cyprus	7–0	Gibraltar
Makris 3'; Therapontos 22'; Lillis 61'; Djamas 66', 90+5'; Katsiati 89'; Karo 90+1'	Report

Městský stadion, Ostrava
Referee: Tamás Bognar (Hungary)

=== Group 2 ===
Pos	Team	Pld	W	D	L	GF	GA	GD	Pts	Qualification
1	Romania	3	1	2	0	3	2	+1	5	Elite round
2	Lithuania	3	1	1	1	2	2	0	4	Elite round
3	Armenia	3	1	1	1	2	2	0	4	
4	Poland (H)	3	0	2	1	2	3	−1	2	

(H) Hosts
10 October 2013
11:00

Romania	1–1	Armenia
Vînă 12'	Report	Simonyan 44'

Olympic Municipal Stadium, Inowrocław
Referee: John Beaton (Scotland)
10 October 2013
15:30

Poland	1–1	Lithuania
Frankowski 63'	Report	Stankevičius 36'

Olympic Municipal Stadium, Inowrocław
Referee: Vlado Glođović (Serbia)

12 October 2013
15:00

Romania	1–0	Lithuania
Vînă 52'	Report

GKS Olimpia Grudziadz, Grudziądz
Referee: Javier Estrada (Spain)
12 October 2013
15:00

Armenia	1–0	Poland
Bakalyan 75'	Report

CSiRT Tuchola stadium, Tuchola
Referee: John Beaton (Scotland)

15 October 2013
15:00

Poland	1–1	Romania
Stolarski 35'	Report	Balasa 4'

GKS Olimpia Grudziadz, Grudziądz
Referee: Javier Estrada (Spain)
15 October 2013
15:00

Lithuania	1–0	Armenia
Stankevičius 15'	Report

CSiRT Tuchola stadium, Tuchola
Referee: Vlado Glodjović (Serbia)

=== Group 3 ===
Pos	Team	Pld	W	D	L	GF	GA	GD	Pts	Qualification
1	Republic of Ireland	3	2	1	0	4	1	+3	7	Elite round
2	Sweden (H)	3	2	0	1	9	3	+6	6	Elite round
3	Bosnia and Herzegovina	3	0	2	1	2	5	−3	2	
4	Azerbaijan	3	0	1	2	1	7	−6	1	

(H) Hosts
10 October 2013
14:00

Republic of Ireland	2–0	Azerbaijan
O'Sullivan 34'; O'Hanlon 83'	Report

Ängelholms IP, Ängelholm
Referee: Slavko Vinčić (Slovenia)
10 October 2013
18:00

Bosnia and Herzegovina	1–4	Sweden
Alispahić 47'	Report	Tanković 10', 56', 67'; Zeneli 57'

Vångavallen, Trelleborg
Referee: Paolo Valeri (Italy)

12 October 2013
14:00

Azerbaijan	0–0	Bosnia and Herzegovina
	Report

Landskrona IP, Landskrona
Referee: Slavko Vinčić (Slovenia)
12 October 2013
16:00

Republic of Ireland	1–0	Sweden
Kelly 83'	Report

Ängelholms IP, Ängelholm
Referee: Dimitar Meckarovski (Macedonia)

15 October 2013
14:00

Bosnia and Herzegovina	1–1	Republic of Ireland
Predragović 24'	Report	Crowe 45+2'

Vångavallen, Trelleborg
Referee: Paolo Valeri (Italy)
15 October 2013
14:00

Sweden	5–1	Azerbaijan
Nordenberg 16', 69'; Hedlund 33'; Olausson 53'; Zeneli 55'	Report	Muradbayli 74'

Landskrona IP, Landskrona
Referee: Dimitar Meckarovski (Macedonia)

=== Group 4 ===
Pos	Team	Pld	W	D	L	GF	GA	GD	Pts	Qualification
1	Belgium (H)	3	2	1	0	6	2	+4	7	Elite round
2	Iceland	3	1	1	1	3	4	−1	4	Elite round
3	France	3	0	3	0	5	5	0	3	
4	Northern Ireland	3	0	1	2	1	4	−3	1	

(H) Hosts

France, the reigning youth world champions having won the 2013 FIFA U-20 World Cup, failed to advance from this stage, thus also missing out on qualification to the 2015 FIFA U-20 World Cup.

10 October 2013
15:00

France	2–2	Iceland
Rabiot 22'; Jean 24'	Report	Finnbogason 83'; Sigurjónsson 87' (pen.)

Eburons Dome Op De Keiberg, Tongeren
Referee: Pavle Radovanović (Montenegro)
10 October 2013
19:30

Belgium	2–0	Northern Ireland
Origi 45'; Bongonda 78'	Report

Mijnstadion, Beringen
Referee: Ken Henry Johnsen (Norway)

12 October 2013
15:00

Belgium	2–0	Iceland
Origi 9'; Schrijvers 53'	Report

KVV Thes Sport, Tessenderlo
Referee: Artyom Kuchin (Kazakhstan)
12 October 2013
19:30

Northern Ireland	1–1	France
Hanna 88'	Report	Jean 68'

Mijnstadion, Beringen
Referee: Pavle Radovanović (Montenegro)

15 October 2013
14:00

France	2–2	Belgium
Dendoncker 12' (o.g.); Rabiot 90+1'	Report	Fiore 69'; Bongonda 78'

Eburons Dome Op De Keiberg, Tongeren
Referee: Ken Henry Johnsen (Norway)
15 October 2013
14:00

Iceland	1–0	Northern Ireland
Ómarsson 57'	Report

KVV Thes Sport, Tessenderlo
Referee: Artyom Kuchin (Kazakhstan)

=== Group 5 ===
Pos	Team	Pld	W	D	L	GF	GA	GD	Pts	Qualification
1	Germany	3	2	1	0	8	2	+6	7	Elite round
2	Scotland	3	1	2	0	3	2	+1	5	Elite round
3	Latvia	3	1	1	1	3	7	−4	4	
4	Belarus (H)	3	0	0	3	2	5	−3	0	

(H) Hosts
10 October 2013
13:00

Scotland	1–1	Latvia
Gauld 90+1'	Report	Kņuts 21'

Torpedo Stadium, Minsk
Attendance: 30
Referee: István Kovács (Romania)
10 October 2013
15:00

Germany	2–1	Belarus
Mukhtar 8'; Gnabry 63'	Report	Kaborda 90+4'

City Stadium, Borisov
Attendance: 150
Referee: Ilias Spathas (Greece)

12 October 2013
13:00

Germany	5–0	Latvia
Selke 22', 40', 49', 84'; Dudziak 37'	Report

Torpedo Stadium, Minsk
Attendance: 100
Referee: Tornike Gvantseladze (Georgia)
12 October 2013
15:00

Belarus	0–1	Scotland
	Report	Johnstone 32'

City Stadium, Borisov
Attendance: 350
Referee: István Kovács (Romania)

15 October 2013
13:00

Scotland	1–1	Germany
Walsh 2'	Report	Gnabry 62'

Torpedo Stadium, Minsk
Attendance: 60
Referee: Ilias Spathas (Greece)
15 October 2013
13:00

Latvia	2–1	Belarus
Gutkovskis 1'; Vītolnieks 55'	Report	Rassadkin 21'

City Stadium, Borisov
Attendance: 60
Referee: Tornike Gvantseladze (Georgia)

=== Group 6 ===
Pos	Team	Pld	W	D	L	GF	GA	GD	Pts	Qualification
1	Greece	3	1	2	0	5	4	+1	5	Elite round
2	Bulgaria (H)	3	1	2	0	4	3	+1	5	Elite round
3	Slovakia	3	0	2	1	5	6	−1	2	
4	Albania	3	0	2	1	2	3	−1	2	

(H) Hosts
12 November 2013
14:00

Slovakia	1–2	Bulgaria
Bero 49' (pen.)	Report	Daskalov 20'; Despodov 75'

Rakovski Stadium, Sevlievo
Referee: Sven Bindels (Luxembourg)
12 November 2013
17:00

Greece	1–0	Albania
Popovits 86'	Report

Lovech Stadium, Lovech
Referee: Eitan Shemeulevitch (Israel)

14 November 2013
14:00

Greece	1–1	Bulgaria
Donis 21'	Report	Despodov 45+1'

Rakovski Stadium, Sevlievo
Referee: Christian Dingert (Germany)
14 November 2013
17:00

Albania	1–1	Slovakia
Prendi 90+1'	Report	Bero 3' (pen.)

Lovech Stadium, Lovech
Referee: Sven Bindels (Luxembourg)

17 November 2013
17:00

Slovakia	3–3	Greece
Bero 50' (pen.), 65', 72'	Report	Kritikos 18'; Donis 76'; Pantelakis 90'

Rakovski Stadium, Sevlievo
Referee: Christian Dingert (Germany)
17 November 2013
14:00

Bulgaria	1–1	Albania
Daskalov 61'	Report	Prendi 75'

Lovech Stadium, Lovech
Referee: Eitan Shemeulevitch (Israel)

=== Group 7 ===
Pos	Team	Pld	W	D	L	GF	GA	GD	Pts	Qualification
1	Serbia (H)	3	3	0	0	5	0	+5	9	Elite round
2	Austria	3	2	0	1	9	2	+7	6	Elite round
3	Kazakhstan	3	0	1	2	1	6	−5	1	
4	Finland	3	0	1	2	0	7	−7	1	

(H) Hosts
13 November 2013
13:00

Serbia	3–0	Kazakhstan
Milinković-Savić 8' (pen.); Gaćinović 22'; Ilić 71'	Report

Stadion Srem Jakovo, Belgrade
Referee: Ognjen Valjić (Bosnia and Herzegovina)
13 November 2013
13:00

Austria	6–0	Finland
Michorl 16'; Bytyqi 20', 67'; Blutsch 50'; Rosenbichler 55'; Grubeck 88'	Report

Stadion Suvača, Pećinci
Referee: Arnold Hunter (Northern Ireland)

15 November 2013
13:00

Serbia	1–0	Finland
Simić 76'	Report

Stadion Suvača, Pećinci
Referee: Christos Nicolaides (Cyprus)
15 November 2013
13:00

Kazakhstan	1–3	Austria
Suley 32'	Report	Bytyqi 4', 68'; Grillitsch 15'

Stadion Srem Jakovo, Belgrade
Referee: Ognjen Valjić (Bosnia and Herzegovina)

18 November 2013
13:00

Austria	0–1	Serbia
	Report	Milinković-Savić 12'

Karađorđe Stadium, Novi Sad
Referee: Arnold Hunter (Northern Ireland)
18 November 2013
13:00

Finland	0–0	Kazakhstan
	Report

Stadion Srem Jakovo, Belgrade
Referee: Christos Nicolaides (Cyprus)

=== Group 8 ===
Pos	Team	Pld	W	D	L	GF	GA	GD	Pts	Qualification
1	Portugal (H)	3	3	0	0	12	2	+10	9	Elite round
2	Norway	3	2	0	1	9	4	+5	6	Elite round
3	Luxembourg	3	1	0	2	5	8	−3	3	
4	San Marino	3	0	0	3	0	12	−12	0	

(H) Hosts
14 November 2013
16:00

Norway	2–0	San Marino
Finne 88'; Hestad 90+4'	Report

Estádio Municipal de Mangualde, Mangualde
Referee: Eiko Saar (Estonia)
14 November 2013
20:00

Portugal	3–0	Luxembourg
A. Silva 7', 45+1'; Rodrigues 70' (pen.)	Report

Estádio João Cardoso, Tondela
Referee: Domagoj Vučkov (Croatia)

16 November 2013
16:00

Luxembourg	1–5	Norway
Catic 38'	Report	Utvik 4', 48'; Sørloth 18', 41'; Finne 61'

Parque Desportivo Sant'Ana, Penalva do Castelo
Referee: Eiko Saar (Estonia)
16 November 2013
18:00

Portugal	6–0	San Marino
Ponde 17', 35', 76'; Martins 32'; Santos 63'; Luís Rafael 81'	Report

Estádio João Cardoso, Tondela
Referee: Paweł Raczkowski (Poland)

19 November 2013
17:00

Norway	2–3	Portugal
Sørloth 47'; Sakor 90+4'	Report	Guzzo 41', 52'; Rodrigues 45+1'

Estádio do Fontelo, Viseu
Referee: Domagoj Vučkov (Croatia)
19 November 2013
17:00

San Marino	0–4	Luxembourg
	Report	Bechtold 19' (pen.); Couto Pinto 30'; Mersch 52'; Fabbro 76'

Estádio João Cardoso, Tondela
Referee: Paweł Raczkowski (Poland)

=== Group 9 ===
Pos	Team	Pld	W	D	L	GF	GA	GD	Pts	Qualification
1	England	3	2	1	0	9	1	+8	7	Elite round
2	Switzerland	3	2	0	1	7	2	+5	6	Elite round
3	Slovenia (H)	3	1	1	1	9	4	+5	4	
4	Andorra	3	0	0	3	0	18	−18	0	

(H) Hosts
10 October 2013
15:00

Switzerland	4–0	Andorra
Elvedi 5'; Tarashaj 26', 79'; Custodio 75'	Report

Bakovci Stadium, Bakovci
Referee: Oleksandr Derdo (Ukraine)
10 October 2013
15:00

England	1–1	Slovenia
Baker 85'	Report	Barišič 13'

Ptuj City Stadium, Ptuj
Referee: Nerijus Dunauskas (Lithuania)

12 October 2013
15:00

Switzerland	3–1	Slovenia
Tarashaj 14' (pen.), 30'; Castroman 33'	Report	Zahović 59'

Bakovci Stadium, Bakovci
Referee: Andreas Ekberg (Sweden)
12 October 2013
15:00

Andorra	0–7	England
	Report	Bennett 17', 78'; Loftus-Cheek 20', 48'; Pearson 41', 45+2'; Morris 57'

Ptuj City Stadium, Ptuj
Referee: Nerijus Dunauskas (Lithuania)

15 October 2013
15:00

England	1–0	Switzerland
Bennett 34'	Report

Ptuj City Stadium, Ptuj
Referee: Oleksandr Derdo (Ukraine)
15 October 2013
15:00

Slovenia	7–0	Andorra
Črnigoj 8', 37', 51'; Gajič 39'; Barišič 58'; Zahović 72', 90+1'	Report

Bakovci Stadium, Bakovci
Referee: Andreas Ekberg (Sweden)

=== Group 10 ===
Pos	Team	Pld	W	D	L	GF	GA	GD	Pts	Qualification
1	Denmark	3	2	0	1	5	3	+2	6	Elite round
2	Israel (H)	3	2	0	1	12	3	+9	6	Elite round
3	Italy	3	2	0	1	7	2	+5	6	Elite round
4	Liechtenstein	3	0	0	3	0	16	−16	0	

(H) Hosts
8 October 2013
16:00

Italy	0–2	Israel
	Report	Ohana 15', 81'

HaMoshava Stadium, Petah Tikva
Referee: Nicolas Rainville (France)
8 October 2013
16:00

Denmark	2–0	Liechtenstein
Hjulsager 36'; Maigaard 58'	Report

National Team Complex, Shefayim
Referee: Clayton Pisani (Malta)

10 October 2013
16:00

Italy	5–0	Liechtenstein
Cristante 10', 52' (pen.); Crecco 23'; Iotti 33'; Kaiser 61' (o.g.)	Report

National Team Complex, Shefayim
Referee: Clayton Pisani (Malta)
10 October 2013
16:00

Israel	1–3	Denmark
Shamir 78'	Report	Plum 19'; Hansen 51'; Hjulsager 55' (pen.)

HaMoshava Stadium, Petah Tikva
Referee: Alexander Kostadinov (Bulgaria)

13 October 2013
16:00

Denmark	0–2	Italy
	Report	Crecco 39'; Petagna 87'

National Team Complex, Shefayim
Referee: Nicolas Rainville (France)
13 October 2013
16:00

Liechtenstein	0–9	Israel
	Report	Safouri 19'; Hugi 23', 50'; Danino 29'; Peretz 41'; Abu El Hija 52'; Cohen 80', 84'; Shamir 82'

HaMoshava Stadium, Petah Tikva
Referee: Alexander Kostadinov (Bulgaria)

=== Group 11 ===
Pos	Team	Pld	W	D	L	GF	GA	GD	Pts	Qualification
1	Georgia (H)	3	3	0	0	9	2	+7	9	Elite round
2	Wales	3	1	1	1	7	5	+2	4	Elite round
3	Netherlands	3	1	1	1	4	2	+2	4	
4	Moldova	3	0	0	3	0	11	−11	0	

(H) Hosts
13 November 2013
11:00

Georgia	5–1	Wales
Papunashvili 22'; Jikia 26', 56'; Gureshidze 43'; Tsintsadze 60'	Report	O'Sullivan 85'

Mikheil Meskhi Stadium, Tbilisi
Referee: Mattias Gestranius (Finland)
13 November 2013
12:00

Netherlands	3–0	Moldova
Zivkovic 55'; Acolatse 72'; Vloet 79'	Report

Dinamo Arena, Tbilisi
Referee: Oliver Drachta (Austria)

15 November 2013
11:00

Moldova	0–2	Georgia
	Report	Kikabidze 4'; Aburjania 8'

Mikheil Meskhi Stadium, Tbilisi
Referee: Oliver Drachta (Austria)
15 November 2013
12:00

Netherlands	0–0	Wales
	Report

Dinamo Arena, Tbilisi
Referee: Miroslav Zelinka (Czech Republic)

18 November 2013
12:00

Georgia	2–1	Netherlands
Papunashvili 10'; Aburjania 51'	Report	Zivkovic 45+1'

Mikheil Meskhi Stadium, Tbilisi
Referee: Miroslav Zelinka (Czech Republic)
18 November 2013
12:00

Wales	6–0	Moldova
Jones 13'; Noor 32'; O'Sullivan 41'; Reid 66'; John 71' (pen.); Kandi 89'	Report

Dinamo Arena, Tbilisi
Referee: Mattias Gestranius (Finland)

=== Group 12 ===
Pos	Team	Pld	W	D	L	GF	GA	GD	Pts	Qualification
1	Turkey	3	2	0	1	7	3	+4	6	Elite round
2	Montenegro	3	2	0	1	8	3	+5	6	Elite round
3	Macedonia (H)	3	2	0	1	8	5	+3	6	
4	Faroe Islands	3	0	0	3	0	12	−12	0	

(H) Hosts
6 September 2013
16:00

Turkey	4–1	Macedonia
Çınar 14'; Taşdemir 30', 63'; Altıntaş 49'	Report	Imeri 33' (pen.)

Stadion Kukuš, Strumica
Referee: Ján Valášek (Slovakia)
6 September 2013
16:00

Montenegro	5–0	Faroe Islands
Janković 37' (pen.); Ilinčić 45+1'; Grbović 53'; Vušurović 64'; Milošević 71'	Report

Stadion Mladost, Strumica
Referee: Vitali Meshkov (Russia)

8 September 2013
16:00

Turkey	2–0	Faroe Islands
Zengin 42'; Demirci 48'	Report

Stadion Mladost, Strumica
Referee: Stephan Klossner (Switzerland)
8 September 2013
16:00

Macedonia	2–1	Montenegro
Velkoski 13'; Kostovski 90+1'	Report	Milošević 64'

Stadion Kukuš, Strumica
Referee: Vitali Meshkov (Russia)

11 September 2013
16:00

Montenegro	2–1	Turkey
Baošić 6'; Ćosić 13'	Report	Tufan 19'

Stadion Mladost, Strumica
Referee: Ján Valášek (Slovakia)
11 September 2013
16:00

Faroe Islands	0–5	Macedonia
	Report	Markoski 11'; Velkoski 16'; Kostovski 65'; Imeri 71'; Sulejmanov 87'

Stadion Kukuš, Strumica
Referee: Stephan Klossner (Switzerland)

=== Group 13 ===
Pos	Team	Pld	W	D	L	GF	GA	GD	Pts	Qualification
1	Russia (H)	3	2	1	0	10	2	+8	7	Elite round
2	Ukraine	3	2	1	0	8	2	+6	7	Elite round
3	Estonia	3	0	1	2	4	10	−6	1	
4	Malta	3	0	1	2	2	10	−8	1	

(H) Hosts
10 October 2013
13:00

Ukraine	3–1	Estonia
Radchenko 64', 72'; Miranyan 90+3'	Report	Kacharaba 44' (o.g.)

Rubin Stadium, Kazan
Referee: Jakob Kehlet (Denmark)
10 October 2013
17:00

Russia	4–0	Malta
Martusevich 4'; Davydov 18', 45'; Yefremov 78'	Report

Rubin Stadium, Kazan
Referee: Gunnar Jarl Jónsson (Iceland)

12 October 2013
13:00

Malta	0–4	Ukraine
	Report	Miranyan 30'; Radchenko 61', 68'; Kharatin 83'

Rubin Stadium, Kazan
Referee: Jakob Kehlet (Denmark)
12 October 2013
17:00

Russia	5–1	Estonia
Davydov 3', 63' (pen.); Morgunov 7'; Efremov 41'; Yaschuk 90+3'	Report	Saliste 1'

Rubin Stadium, Kazan
Referee: Marco Ferreira (Portugal)

15 October 2013
17:00

Ukraine	1–1	Russia
Kovalenko 45+1'	Report	Morgunov 17'

Rubin Stadium, Kazan
Referee: Marco Ferreira (Portugal)
15 October 2013
17:00

Estonia	2–2	Malta
Välja 12'; Vaštšuk 75' (pen.)	Report	Mckay 33'; Debono 84'

Trudovye Rezervy Stadium, Kazan
Referee: Gunnar Jarl Jónsson (Iceland)

== Ranking of third-placed teams ==
To determine the best third-ranked team from the qualifying round, only the results of the third-placed team against the winners and runners-up in each group are taken into account.

Pos	Grp	Team	Pld	W	D	L	GF	GA	GD	Pts	Qualification
1	10	Italy	2	1	0	1	2	2	0	3	Elite round
2	12	Macedonia	2	1	0	1	3	5	−2	3	
3	4	France	2	0	2	0	4	4	0	2	
4	6	Slovakia	2	0	1	1	4	5	−1	1	
5	2	Armenia	2	0	1	1	1	2	−1	1	
6	11	Netherlands	2	0	1	1	1	2	−1	1	
7	9	Slovenia	2	0	1	1	2	4	−2	1	
8	3	Bosnia and Herzegovina	2	0	1	1	2	5	−3	1	
9	1	Croatia	2	0	1	1	2	5	−3	1	
10	5	Latvia	2	0	1	1	1	6	−5	1	
11	7	Kazakhstan	2	0	0	2	1	6	−5	0	
12	13	Estonia	2	0	0	2	2	8	−6	0	
13	8	Luxembourg	2	0	0	2	1	8	−7	0	
