= 2014 UEFA European Under-19 Championship squads =

Player listings in youth football competition

The 2014 UEFA European Under-19 Championship was an international football tournament held in Hungary from 19 to 31 July 2014. The eight under-19 age group national teams involved in the tournament were required to register a squad of 18 players. Players were eligible to play in the competition if they were born on or after 1 January 1995. Only players in these squads were eligible to take part in the tournament.

Ages are as of the start of the tournament, 19 July 2014.

Players marked in boldface have been capped at full international level.

== Group A ==
=== Hungary ===
Head coach: (Hungary) Géza Mészöly

No.	Pos.	Player	Date of birth (age)	Caps	Goals	Club
1	GK	Alex Hrabina	5 April 1995 (aged 19)	0	0	(Hungarian Football Federation) Nyíregyháza Spartacus
3	DF	Attila Talabér	29 May 1996 (aged 18)	0	0	(Hungarian Football Federation) MTK Budapest
4	DF	Bence Lenzsér	9 April 1996 (aged 18)	0	0	(Hungarian Football Federation) Gőri ETO
5	DF	Krisztián Tamás	18 April 1995 (aged 19)	0	0	(Italian Football Federation) Milan
6	DF	Dávid Bobál	31 August 1995 (aged 18)	0	0	(Hungarian Football Federation) Budapest Honvéd
7	MF	Zoltán Medgyes	23 July 1995 (aged 18)	0	0	(Hungarian Football Federation) Szombathelyi Haladás
8	MF	Bence Mervó	5 March 1995 (aged 19)	0	0	(Hungarian Football Federation) Győri ETO
9	FW	Gergely Bobál	31 August 1995 (aged 18)	0	0	(Hungarian Football Federation) Budapest Honvéd
10	MF	Márió Németh	1 May 1995 (aged 19)	0	0	(Hungarian Football Federation) Szombathelyi Haladás
11	FW	Dávid Forgács	29 September 1995 (aged 18)	0	0	(Italian Football Federation) Atalanta
12	GK	György Székely	2 June 1995 (aged 19)	0	0	(German Football Association) 1860 Munich II
13	FW	**Norbert Balogh**	21 February 1996 (aged 18)	0	0	(Hungarian Football Federation) Létavértes SC 97
14	MF	**Dominik Nagy**	8 May 1995 (aged 19)	0	0	(Hungarian Football Federation) Ferencváros
17	FW	Zoltán Farkas	11 August 1995 (aged 18)	0	0	(Hungarian Football Federation) Győri ETO
18	MF	Donát Zsótér	6 January 1996 (aged 18)	0	0	(Hungarian Football Federation) Dunaújváros PASE
19	MF	**Zsolt Kalmár**	9 June 1995 (aged 19)	0	0	(Hungarian Football Federation) Győri ETO
20	MF	Dávid Asztalos	9 March 1995 (aged 19)	0	0	(Hungarian Football Federation) MTK Budapest
23	FW	Szabolcs Varga	17 March 1995 (aged 19)	0	0	(Royal Dutch Football Association) Heerenveen

=== Austria ===
Head coach: (Austria) Andreas Heraf

No.	Pos.	Player	Date of birth (age)	Caps	Goals	Club
1	GK	Ivan Lučić	23 March 1995 (aged 19)			(German Football Association) Bayern Munich
3	DF	Daniel Rosenbichler	17 October 1995 (aged 18)			(Austrian Football Association) Admira Wacker
4	DF	Lukas Gugganig	14 February 1995 (aged 19)			(Austrian Football Association) FC Liefering
5	DF	Patrick Puchegger	4 May 1995 (aged 19)			(German Football Association) Bayern Munich
6	DF	Francesco Lovrić	5 October 1995 (aged 18)			(German Football Association) VfB Stuttgart
7	MF	Sascha Horvath	22 August 1996 (aged 17)			(Austrian Football Association) Austria Wien
8	MF	Peter Michorl	9 May 1995 (aged 19)			(Austrian Football Association) Austria Wien
9	FW	Valentin Grubeck	26 February 1995 (aged 19)			(Austrian Football Association) SV Horn
10	FW	Markus Blutsch	1 June 1995 (aged 19)			(Austrian Football Association) LASK
11	FW	Sinan Bytyqi	15 January 1995 (aged 19)			(The Football Association) Manchester City
13	MF	Michael Brandner	13 February 1995 (aged 19)			(Austrian Football Association) FC Liefering
15	DF	**Philipp Lienhart**	11 July 1996 (aged 18)			(Austrian Football Association) Rapid Wien
16	DF	Alexander Joppich	19 January 1995 (aged 19)			(Austrian Football Association) FC Liefering
17	MF	**Konrad Laimer**	27 May 1997 (aged 17)			(Austrian Football Association) Red Bull Salzburg
18	MF	Martin Rasner	18 May 1995 (aged 19)			(Austrian Football Association) FC Liefering
19	FW	Daniel Maderner	12 October 1995 (aged 18)			(Austrian Football Association) Wiener Neustadt
20	FW	**Florian Grillitsch**	7 August 1995 (aged 18)			(German Football Association) Werder Bremen
21	GK	Tino Casali	14 November 1995 (aged 18)			(Austrian Football Association) Austria Wien

=== Portugal ===
Head coach: (Portugal) Hélio Sousa

Hélio Sousa named his final 18-man squad on 23 June 2014. On 23 July 2014, Romário Baldé replaced injured Nuno Santos.

No.	Pos.	Player	Date of birth (age)	Caps	Goals	Club
1	GK	Tiago Sá	11 January 1995 (aged 19)	12	0	(Portuguese Football Federation) Braga
2	DF	Pedro Rebocho	23 January 1995 (aged 19)	29	0	(Portuguese Football Federation) Benfica
3	DF	João Nunes	19 November 1995 (aged 18)	13	0	(Portuguese Football Federation) Benfica
4	DF	Jordan Machado	28 January 1995 (aged 19)	8	0	(French Football Federation) Montpellier
5	DF	Luís Rafael	9 May 1995 (aged 19)	25	2	(Portuguese Football Federation) Porto
6	MF	Tomás Podstawski	30 January 1995 (aged 19)	32	0	(Portuguese Football Federation) Porto
7	MF	Raphael Guzzo	6 January 1995 (aged 19)	15	2	(Portuguese Football Federation) Benfica
8	MF	Francisco Ramos	10 April 1995 (aged 19)	20	2	(Portuguese Football Federation) Porto
9	FW	**André Silva**	6 November 1995 (aged 18)	19	11	(Portuguese Football Federation) Porto
10	FW	**Marcos Lopes**	12 December 1995 (aged 18)	20	12	(French Football Federation) Lille
11	FW	Nuno Santos	23 February 1995 (aged 19)	16	6	(Portuguese Football Federation) Benfica
12	GK	André Moreira	2 December 1995 (aged 18)	3	0	(Portuguese Football Federation) Ribeirão
13	DF	Mauro Riquicho	7 April 1995 (aged 19)	4	0	(Portuguese Football Federation) Sporting CP
14	DF	**Domingos Duarte**	10 March 1995 (aged 19)	10	1	(Portuguese Football Federation) Sporting CP
15	MF	**Jorge Intima** (Note: Capped for Guinea-Bissau)	21 September 1995 (aged 18)	7	3	(The Football Association) Manchester City
16	MF	**João Palhinha**	9 July 1995 (aged 19)	12	1	(Portuguese Football Federation) Sporting CP
17	FW	Ivo Rodrigues	30 March 1995 (aged 19)	10	6	(Portuguese Football Federation) Porto
18	FW	**Gelson Martins**	11 May 1995 (aged 19)	16	6	(Portuguese Football Federation) Sporting CP
19	FW	**Romário Baldé**	25 December 1996 (aged 17)	0	0	(Portuguese Football Federation) Benfica

=== Israel ===
Head coach: (Israel) Eli Ohana

No.	Pos.	Player	Date of birth (age)	Caps	Goals	Club
1	GK	Dean Gal	13 February 1995 (aged 19)	10	0	(Israel Football Association) Maccabi Netanya
2	DF	Guy Aviv	26 February 1996 (aged 18)	5	0	(Israel Football Association) Maccabi Tel Aviv
3	DF	Omer Danino	17 February 1995 (aged 19)	14	1	(Israel Football Association) Maccabi Petah Tikva
4	DF	**David Keltjens**	11 June 1995 (aged 19)	6	0	(Israel Football Association) Beitar Jerusalem
5	DF	**Ayid Habshi**	10 May 1995 (aged 19)	12	0	(Israel Football Association) Maccabi Haifa
6	FW	Dor Hugi	10 July 1995 (aged 19)	14	2	(Israel Football Association) Hapoel Petah Tikva
7	MF	**Dan Glazer**	20 September 1996 (aged 17)	4	0	(Israel Football Association) Maccabi Tel Aviv
8	FW	**Shon Weissman**	14 February 1996 (aged 18)	11	2	(Israel Football Association) Maccabi Haifa
9	FW	**Michael Ohana**	4 October 1995 (aged 18)	14	4	(Israel Football Association) Ashdod
10	MF	**Ramzi Safouri**	21 October 1995 (aged 18)	14	3	(Israel Football Association) Hapoel Tel Aviv
11	FW	Noor Bisan	17 January 1995 (aged 19)	8	0	(Israel Football Association) Maccabi Netanya
12	DF	Sagi Dror	7 August 1995 (aged 18)	6	2	(Israel Football Association) Hapoel Ra'anana
13	DF	**Sean Goldberg**	13 June 1995 (aged 19)	9	0	(Israel Football Association) Maccabi Tel Aviv
14	MF	**Dor Peretz**	17 May 1995 (aged 19)	6	1	(Israel Football Association) Maccabi Tel Aviv
15	MF	Eden Shamir	26 June 1995 (aged 19)	13	3	(Israel Football Association) Hapoel Ironi Kiryat Shmona
16	FW	Sagiv Yehezkel	21 March 1995 (aged 19)	14	2	(Israel Football Association) Hapoel Tel Aviv
17	DF	Mohammed Abu El Hija	11 January 1995 (aged 19)	13	1	(Israel Football Association) Hapoel Tel Aviv
18	GK	Stav Shushan	14 May 1995 (aged 19)	0	0	(Israel Football Association) Beitar Jerusalem

== Group B ==
=== Bulgaria ===
Head coach: (Bulgaria) Aleksandar Dimitrov

No.	Pos.	Player	Date of birth (age)	Caps	Goals	Club
1	GK	Kristiyan Katsarev	7 August 1995 (aged 18)	0	0	(Bulgarian Football Union) Lokomotiv Sofia
2	DF	Vasil Popov	19 November 1995 (aged 18)	7	0	(Bulgarian Football Union) CSKA Sofia
3	MF	Reyan Daskalov	10 February 1995 (aged 19)	6	2	(Bulgarian Football Union) Litex Lovech
4	DF	Preslav Petrov	1 May 1995 (aged 19)	3	0	(Bulgarian Football Union) Ludogorets Razgrad
5	DF	Plamen Galabov	2 November 1995 (aged 18)	5	0	(Bulgarian Football Union) Litex Lovech
6	DF	Hristofor Hubchev	24 November 1995 (aged 18)	6	0	(Bulgarian Football Union) Montana
7	FW	**Kiril Despodov**	11 November 1996 (aged 17)	11	3	(Bulgarian Football Union) Litex Lovech
8	MF	Nikola Kolev	6 June 1995 (aged 19)	3	1	(Bulgarian Football Union) Litex Lovech
9	FW	Georgi Minchev	20 April 1995 (aged 19)	5	0	(Bulgarian Football Union) Litex Lovech
10	MF	Stanislav Dryanov	4 February 1995 (aged 19)	10	1	(Bulgarian Football Union) Botev Plovdiv
11	MF	Antonio Vutov	6 June 1996 (aged 18)	5	2	(Italian Football Federation) Udinese
12	GK	Aleksandar Lyubenov	11 February 1995 (aged 19)	6	0	(Bulgarian Football Union) Levski Sofia
13	MF	Dimitar Velkovski	22 January 1995 (aged 19)	2	0	(Bulgarian Football Union) Lokomotiv Sofia
14	DF	Miki Orachev	19 March 1996 (aged 18)	3	0	(Bulgarian Football Union) Levski Sofia
16	MF	Petar Vitanov	10 March 1995 (aged 19)	3	0	(Bulgarian Football Union) CSKA Sofia
19	DF	Aleksandar Vasilev	27 April 1995 (aged 19)	8	0	(Bulgarian Football Union) Ludogorets Razgrad
20	DF	**Stefan Velkov**	12 December 1996 (aged 17)	0	0	(Bulgarian Football Union) Slavia Sofia
21	MF	Radoslav Tsonev	29 April 1995 (aged 19)	5	0	(Bulgarian Football Union) Levski Sofia

=== Germany ===
Head coach: (Germany) Marcus Sorg

No.	Pos.	Player	Date of birth (age)	Caps	Goals	Club
1	GK	Oliver Schnitzler	13 October 1995 (aged 18)	5	0	(German Football Association) VfR Aalen
2	DF	**Kevin Akpoguma** (Note: Capped for Nigeria)	19 April 1995 (aged 19)	13	0	(German Football Association) 1899 Hoffenheim
3	DF	Fabian Holthaus	17 January 1995 (aged 19)	12	1	(German Football Association) VfL Bochum
4	MF	**Niklas Stark**	14 April 1995 (aged 19)	9	2	(German Football Association) 1. FC Nürnberg
5	DF	Marc-Oliver Kempf	28 January 1995 (aged 19)	13	0	(German Football Association) Eintracht Frankfurt
6	MF	**Joshua Kimmich**	8 February 1995 (aged 19)	5	1	(German Football Association) RB Leipzig
7	MF	Hany Mukhtar	21 March 1995 (aged 19)	11	7	(German Football Association) Hertha BSC
8	MF	Levin Öztunalı	15 March 1996 (aged 18)	7	2	(German Football Association) Bayer Leverkusen
9	MF	Davie Selke	20 January 1995 (aged 19)	10	8	(German Football Association) Werder Bremen
10	MF	Marc Stendera	10 December 1995 (aged 18)	10	3	(German Football Association) Eintracht Frankfurt
11	MF	**Julian Brandt**	2 May 1996 (aged 18)	10	2	(German Football Association) Bayer Leverkusen
12	GK	Marius Gersbeck	20 June 1995 (aged 19)	2	0	(German Football Association) Hertha BSC
13	DF	Pascal Itter	3 April 1995 (aged 19)	10	0	(German Football Association) Schalke 04
14	MF	Felix Lohkemper	26 January 1995 (aged 19)	8	3	(German Football Association) VfB Stuttgart
15	MF	**Jeremy Dudziak** (Note: Capped for Tunisia)	28 August 1995 (aged 18)	5	1	(German Football Association) Borussia Dortmund
16	DF	Anthony Syhre	18 March 1995 (aged 19)	11	0	(German Football Association) Hertha BSC
17	MF	Benjamin Trümner	17 May 1995 (aged 19)	4	0	(German Football Association) 1899 Hoffenheim
18	DF	Marvin Friedrich	13 December 1995 (aged 18)	1	1	(German Football Association) Schalke 04
19	MF	Sebastian Stolze	29 January 1995 (aged 19)	3	2	(German Football Association) VfL Wolfsburg

=== Ukraine ===
Head coach: (Ukraine) Oleksandr Petrakov

No.	Pos.	Player	Date of birth (age)	Caps	Goals	Club
1	GK	Roman Pidkivka	9 May 1995 (aged 19)	1	0	(Ukrainian Association of Football) Karpaty Lviv
2	DF	**Taras Kacharaba**	7 January 1995 (aged 19)	6	0	(Ukrainian Association of Football) Shakhtar Donetsk
3	DF	**Mykyta Burda**	24 March 1995 (aged 19)	1	0	(Ukrainian Association of Football) Dynamo Kyiv
4	DF	Pavlo Lukyanchuk	19 May 1996 (aged 18)	6	0	(Ukrainian Association of Football) Dynamo Kyiv
5	MF	Yuriy Tkachuk	18 April 1995 (aged 19)	6	0	(Ukrainian Association of Football) Metalist Kharkiv
6	MF	Vyacheslav Tankovskyi	16 August 1995 (aged 18)	6	1	(Ukrainian Association of Football) Shakhtar Donetsk
7	MF	Yevhen Chumak	25 August 1995 (aged 18)	6	0	(Ukrainian Association of Football) Dynamo Kyiv
8	MF	Mykyta Adamenko	14 September 1995 (aged 18)	1	0	(Ukrainian Association of Football) Shakhtar Donetsk
9	FW	Artem Radchenko	2 January 1995 (aged 19)	6	4	(Ukrainian Association of Football) Metalist Kharkiv
10	FW	Dmytro Bilonoh	26 May 1995 (aged 19)	4	0	(Ukrainian Association of Football) Shakhtar Donetsk
11	FW	**Roman Yaremchuk**	27 November 1995 (aged 18)	5	0	(Ukrainian Association of Football) Dynamo Kyiv
12	GK	Bohdan Sarnavskyi	29 January 1995 (aged 19)	16	0	(Ukrainian Association of Football) Shakhtar Donetsk
14	MF	Maksym Banasevych	31 January 1995 (aged 19)	5	0	(Ukrainian Association of Football) Zorya Luhansk
15	FW	**Artem Besyedin**	31 March 1996 (aged 18)	4	0	(Ukrainian Association of Football) Dynamo Kyiv
16	DF	Andriy Markovych	25 June 1995 (aged 19)	1	0	(Ukrainian Association of Football) Karpaty Lviv
17	MF	**Viktor Kovalenko**	14 February 1996 (aged 18)	6	1	(Ukrainian Association of Football) Shakhtar Donetsk
18	DF	**Eduard Sobol**	20 April 1995 (aged 19)	10	0	(Ukrainian Association of Football) Shakhtar Donetsk
19	MF	Ihor Kharatin	2 February 1995 (aged 19)	6	1	(Ukrainian Association of Football) Dynamo Kyiv

=== Serbia ===
Head coach: (Serbia) Veljko Paunović

The following players were named in the squad for the 2014 UEFA European Under-19 Championship in July 2014.

No.	Pos.	Player	Date of birth (age)	Caps	Goals	Club
1	GK	**Predrag Rajković**	31 October 1995 (aged 18)	6	0	(Football Association of Serbia) Red Star Belgrade
2	MF	**Milan Gajić**	28 January 1996 (aged 18)	13	1	(Football Association of Serbia) OFK Beograd
3	DF	Nemanja Antonov	6 May 1995 (aged 19)	11	0	(Football Association of Serbia) OFK Beograd
4	MF	**Saša Zdjelar**	20 March 1995 (aged 19)	13	1	(Football Association of Serbia) OFK Beograd
5	DF	Miladin Stevanović	11 February 1996 (aged 18)	4	0	(Football Association of Serbia) Teleoptik
6	DF	**Srđan Babić**	22 April 1996 (aged 18)	8	2	(Football Association of Serbia) Vojvodina
7	MF	Veljko Simić	17 February 1995 (aged 19)	15	8	(Swiss Football Association) Basel
8	MF	**Nemanja Maksimović** (captain)	26 January 1995 (aged 19)	11	2	(Football Association of Slovenia) Domžale
9	FW	**Staniša Mandić** (Note: Capped for Montenegro)	27 January 1995 (aged 19)	6	1	(Football Association of Serbia) Čukarički
10	FW	**Mijat Gaćinović**	8 February 1995 (aged 19)	11	3	(Football Association of Serbia) Vojvodina
11	FW	**Andrija Živković**	11 July 1996 (aged 18)	5	1	(Football Association of Serbia) Partizan
12	GK	**Vanja Milinković-Savić**	20 February 1997 (aged 17)	3	0	(Football Association of Serbia) Vojvodina
13	MF	**Marko Grujić**	13 April 1996 (aged 18)	0	0	(Football Association of Serbia) Red Star Belgrade
14	DF	Vukašin Jovanović	17 May 1996 (aged 18)	0	0	(Football Association of Serbia) Red Star Belgrade
15	DF	**Mihailo Ristić**	31 October 1995 (aged 18)	0	0	(Football Association of Serbia) Red Star Belgrade
16	MF	Danilo Pantić	26 October 1996 (aged 17)	4	0	(Football Association of Serbia) Partizan
17	FW	Dejan Dražić	26 September 1995 (aged 18)	4	0	(Football Association of Serbia) OFK Beograd
18	FW	**Luka Jović**	23 December 1997 (aged 16)	0	0	(Football Association of Serbia) Red Star Belgrade

== Player representation ==
=== By club ===
Players	Clubs
7	(Ukraine) Shakhtar Donetsk
6	(Ukraine) Dynamo Kyiv, (Portugal) Porto
5	(Bulgaria) Litex Lovech
4	(Portugal) Benfica, (Hungary) Győri ETO, (Bulgaria) Levski Sofia, (Austria) FC Liefering, (Israel) Maccabi Tel Aviv, (Serbia) OFK Beograd, (Serbia) Red Star Belgrade, (Serbia) Vojvodina
3	Austria Wien, (Israel) Hapoel Tel Aviv, (Germany) Hertha BSC, (Portugal) Sporting CP
2	(Germany) Bayer Leverkusen, (Germany) Bayern Munich, (Israel) Beitar Jerusalem, (Hungary) Budapest Honvéd, (Bulgaria) CSKA Sofia, (Germany) Eintracht Frankfurt, (Germany) 1899 Hoffenheim, (Ukraine) Karpaty Lviv, (Bulgaria) Lokomotiv Sofia, (Bulgaria) Ludogorets Razgrad, (Israel) Maccabi Haifa, (Israel) Maccabi Netanya, (England) Manchester City, (Ukraine) Metalist Kharkiv, (Hungary) MTK Budapest, (Serbia) Partizan, (Germany) Schalke 04, (Hungary) Szombathelyi Haladás, (Germany) Werder Bremen
1	(Germany) 1860 Munich II, (Germany) VfR Aalen, (Austria) Admira Wacker, (Israel) Asdod, (Italy) Atalanta, (Switzerland) Basel, (Germany) VfL Bochum, (Germany) Borussia Dortmund, (Bulgaria) Botev Plovdiv, (Portugal) Braga, (Serbia) Čukarički, (Slovenia) Domžale, (Hungary) Dunaújváros PASE, (Hungary) Ferencváros, (Israel) Hapoel Ironi Kiryat Shmona, (Israel) Hapoel Petah Tikva, (Israel) Hapoel Ra'anana, (Netherlands) Heerenveen, (Austria) Horn, (Austria) LASK, (Germany) RB Leipzig, (Hungary) Létavértes SC 97, (France) Lille, (Israel) Maccabi Petah Tikva, (Italy) Milan, (Bulgaria) Montana, (France) Montpellier, (Germany) 1. FC Nürnberg, (Hungary) Nyíregyháza Spartacus, (Austria) Rapid Wien, (Austria) Red Bull Salzburg, (Portugal) Ribeirão, (Bulgaria) Slavia Sofia, (Germany) VfB Stuttgart, (Serbia) Teleoptik, (Italy) Udinese, (Austria) Wiener Neustadt, (Ukraine) Zorya Luhansk

=== By club nationality ===
Players	Clubs
23	Germany
18	Israel, Ukraine
17	Bulgaria
16	Serbia
15	Portugal
14	Hungary
13	Austria
3	Italy
2	England, France
1	Netherlands, Slovenia, Switzerland

Nations in italics are not represented by their national teams in the finals.
