= 2014 UEFA European Under-19 Championship elite round =

European football tournament

The 2014 UEFA European Under-19 Championship elite round was the second round of qualification for the 2014 UEFA European Under-19 Championship final tournament. The 27 teams advancing from the first qualification round plus Spain, who received a bye to the elite round, were distributed into seven groups of four teams, with one of the teams in each group hosting all six matches in a round-robin format. The seven group-winning teams qualified automatically for the final tournament in Hungary.

== Seeding ==
The draw for the elite round was held at the UEFA headquarters in Nyon, on 28 November 2013. Each team was placed in one of four drawing pots, according to their qualifying round results. The seven sides with the best records were seeded in Pot A, and so forth until Pot D, which contained the seven teams with the weakest records. During the draw, each group was filled with one team from every pot, taking into account that teams that played each other in the first qualifying round could not be drawn into the same group again.

Pot A	Pot B	Pot C	Pot D
Spain; Portugal; Czech Republic; Georgia; Serbia; Russia; England	Germany; Ukraine; Belgium; Republic of Ireland; Israel; Austria; Sweden	Norway; Montenegro; Switzerland; Italy; Turkey; Denmark; Greece	Bulgaria; Scotland; Romania; Cyprus; Wales; Lithuania; Iceland

== Tiebreakers ==
If two or more teams were equal on points on completion of the group matches, the following criteria were applied to determine the rankings.

1. Higher number of points obtained in the group matches played among the teams in question
2. Superior goal difference from the group matches played among the teams in question
3. Higher number of goals scored in the group matches played among the teams in question
4. If, after applying criteria 1) to 3) to several teams, two teams still had an equal ranking, criteria 1) to 3) would be reapplied to determine the ranking of these teams. If this procedure did not lead to a decision, criteria 5) and 6) would apply
5. Results of all group matches:
  1. Superior goal difference
  2. Higher number of goals scored
6. Drawing of lots

Additionally, if two teams which had the same number of points, goals scored and goals conceded played their last group match against each other and were still equal at the end of that match, their final rankings were determined by means of a penalty shoot-out. This procedure was applicable only if a ranking of the teams was required to determine the group winner.

== Groups ==
The hosts of the seven mini-tournament groups are indicated below.

All times are CEST (UTC+02:00).

=== Group 1 ===
Pos	Team	Pld	W	D	L	GF	GA	GD	Pts	Qualification
1	Ukraine	3	2	1	0	5	0	+5	7	Final tournament
2	England (H)	3	2	0	1	8	2	+6	6	
3	Montenegro	3	1	0	2	1	10	−9	3	
4	Scotland	3	0	1	2	1	3	−2	1	

(H) Hosts
24 May 2014
16:00

England	6–0	Montenegro
Ibe 27', 58', 65'; Baker 52' (pen.); Gallagher 62'; Robinson 90+2'	Report

Bescot Stadium, Walsall
Referee: Markus Hameter (Austria)
24 May 2014
20:30

Ukraine	0–0	Scotland
	Report

Pirelli Stadium, Burton upon Trent
Referee: Jesús Gil Manzano (Spain)

26 May 2014
16:00

Montenegro	0–4	Ukraine
	Report	Kovalenko 45+5'; Bilonoh 56'; Tankovskyi 64'; Habelok 73'

Bescot Stadium, Walsall
Referee: Markus Hameter (Austria)
26 May 2014
20:30

England	2–1	Scotland
Baker 76', 82'	Report	Souttar 51'

Pirelli Stadium, Burton upon Trent
Referee: Artur Soares Dias (Portugal)

29 May 2014
16:00

Scotland	0–1	Montenegro
	Report	Grbović 10'

Bescot Stadium, Walsall
Referee: Artur Soares Dias (Portugal)
29 May 2014
16:00

Ukraine	1–0	England
Sobol 90+4'	Report

Pirelli Stadium, Burton upon Trent
Referee: Jesús Gil Manzano (Spain)

=== Group 2 ===
Pos	Team	Pld	W	D	L	GF	GA	GD	Pts	Qualification
1	Bulgaria (H)	3	2	1	0	5	2	+3	7	Final tournament
2	Sweden	3	2	0	1	7	3	+4	6	
3	Czech Republic	3	1	0	2	1	5	−4	3	
4	Italy	3	0	1	2	2	5	−3	1	

(H) Hosts
24 May 2014
15:30

Czech Republic	1–0	Italy
Holzer 72'	Report

Hadzhi Dimitar Stadium, Sliven
Referee: Peter Kralović (Slovakia)
24 May 2014
18:00

Sweden	1–2	Bulgaria
Tanković 89'	Report	Dryanov 2'; Tsonev 13'

Beroe Stadium, Stara Zagora
Referee: Erik Lambrechts (Belgium)

26 May 2014
17:00

Czech Republic	0–2	Bulgaria
	Report	Kolev 52'; Vutov 62'

Hadzhi Dimitar Stadium, Sliven
Referee: Erik Lambrechts (Belgium)
26 May 2014
17:00

Italy	1–3	Sweden
Grassi 40'	Report	Gustafson 48', 73'; Berisha 59'

Beroe Stadium, Stara Zagora
Referee: Tobias Stieler (Germany)

29 May 2014
17:00

Sweden	3–0	Czech Republic
Tanković 6'; Olsson 14'; Berisha 37'	Report

Hadzhi Dimitar Stadium, Sliven
Referee: Tobias Stieler (Germany)
29 May 2014
17:00

Bulgaria	1–1	Italy
Vutov 72' (pen.)	Report	Crecco 74'

Beroe Stadium, Stara Zagora
Referee: Peter Kralović (Slovakia)

=== Group 3 ===
Pos	Team	Pld	W	D	L	GF	GA	GD	Pts	Qualification
1	Israel	3	3	0	0	6	0	+6	9	Final tournament
2	Georgia	3	2	0	1	7	2	+5	6	
3	Switzerland (H)	3	1	0	2	2	3	−1	3	
4	Cyprus	3	0	0	3	1	11	−10	0	

(H) Hosts
25 May 2014
14:00

Israel	4–0	Cyprus
Weissman 36'; Ohana 73', 86'; Dror 90+4'	Report

Colovray, Nyon
Referee: Jari Järvinen (Finland)
25 May 2014
16:00

Georgia	2–0	Switzerland
Dartsimelia 31'; Papunashvili 86'	Report

Stade Juan-Antonio-Samaranch, Lausanne
Referee: Danilo Grujić (Serbia)

27 May 2014
16:30

Georgia	5–1	Cyprus
Tsintsadze 14'; Kikabidze 19', 55'; Zarandia 30'; Loizides 45+2' (o.g.)	Report	Panayiotou 90+3' (pen.)

Stade Juan-Antonio-Samaranch, Lausanne
Referee: Danilo Grujić (Serbia)
27 May 2014
18:00

Switzerland	0–1	Israel
	Report	Weissman 5'

Colovray, Nyon
Referee: Marius Avram (Romania)

30 May 2014
18:00

Israel	1–0	Georgia
Yehezkel 69'	Report

Colovray, Nyon
Referee: Marius Avram (Romania)
30 May 2014
18:00

Cyprus	0–2	Switzerland
	Report	Graf 70'; Karlen 76'

Stade Juan-Antonio-Samaranch, Lausanne
Referee: Jari Järvinen (Finland)

=== Group 4 ===
Pos	Team	Pld	W	D	L	GF	GA	GD	Pts	Qualification
1	Serbia	3	2	1	0	10	2	+8	7	Final tournament
2	Turkey	3	2	1	0	7	5	+2	7	
3	Republic of Ireland (H)	3	1	0	2	4	6	−2	3	
4	Iceland	3	0	0	3	4	12	−8	0	

(H) Hosts
28 May 2014
15:00

Serbia	1–1	Turkey
Maksimović 90+6'	Report	Demirci 24' (pen.)

Carlisle Grounds, Bray
Referee: Benoît Bastien (France)
28 May 2014
20:00

Republic of Ireland	2–1	Iceland
Byrne 51', 60'	Report	Jóhannesson 67'

Tallaght Stadium, Tallaght
Referee: Andris Treimanis (Latvia)

30 May 2014
16:00

Serbia	6–0	Iceland
Simić 33', 59'; Milinković-Savić 38' (pen.), 54'; Babić 58'; Živković 79'	Report

Carlisle Grounds, Bray
Referee: Anders Poulsen (Denmark)
30 May 2014
20:00

Turkey	2–1	Republic of Ireland
Ünal 50'; Aydın 81'	Report	Browne 71' (pen.)

Tallaght Stadium, Tallaght
Referee: Andris Treimanis (Latvia)

2 June 2014
16:00

Republic of Ireland	1–3	Serbia
Byrne 70'	Report	Simić 36', 67'; Mandić 46'

Tallaght Stadium, Tallaght
Referee: Benoît Bastien (France)
2 June 2014
16:00

Iceland	3–4	Turkey
O. Ómarsson 17'; Finnbogason 29'; E. Ómarsson 90+4'	Report	Ünal 5'; Altıntaş 32', 78', 89'

UCD Bowl, Dublin
Referee: Anders Poulsen (Denmark)

=== Group 5 ===
Pos	Team	Pld	W	D	L	GF	GA	GD	Pts	Qualification
1	Germany	3	3	0	0	9	1	+8	9	Final tournament
2	Spain (H)	3	2	0	1	6	4	+2	6	
3	Denmark	3	1	0	2	4	8	−4	3	
4	Lithuania	3	0	0	3	1	7	−6	0	

(H) Hosts
31 May 2014
12:00

Germany	2–0	Lithuania
Holthaus 8'; Mukhtar 78'	Report

Balaídos, Vigo
Referee: Andreas Pappas (Greece)
31 May 2014
20:30

Spain	3–1	Denmark
Sandro 33' (pen.); Munir 74'; López 90+2'	Report	Mathiasen 50'

Balaídos, Vigo
Referee: Davide Massa (Italia)

2 June 2014
12:00

Denmark	0–4	Germany
	Report	Meyer 31', 56'; Mukhtar 60'; Stendera 89'

Balaídos, Vigo
Referee: Andreas Pappas (Greece)
2 June 2014
20:30

Spain	2–0	Lithuania
Munir 31'; Sandro 90' (pen.)	Report

Balaídos, Vigo
Referee: Ádám Németh (Hungary)

5 June 2014
20:30

Germany	3–1	Spain
Selke 19'; Brandt 37'; Lohkemper 78'	Report	Munir 6'

Balaídos, Vigo
Referee: Davide Massa (Italia)
5 June 2014
20:30

Lithuania	1–3	Denmark
Šegžda 44'	Report	Hansen 3'; Nordam 16'; Børsting 88'

Estadio Municipal de Pasarón, Pontevedra
Referee: Ádám Németh (Hungary)

=== Group 6 ===
Pos	Team	Pld	W	D	L	GF	GA	GD	Pts	Qualification
1	Austria	3	2	1	0	8	1	+7	7	Final tournament
2	Russia	3	2	1	0	6	1	+5	7	
3	Romania (H)	3	1	0	2	4	8	−4	3	
4	Norway	3	0	0	3	1	9	−8	0	

(H) Hosts
5 June 2014
17:30

Russia	3–0	Norway
Davydov 32', 50' (pen.); Koryan 60'	Report

Stadionul Buftea, Buftea
Referee: Eitan Shemeulevitch (Israel)
5 June 2014
20:00

Austria	5–0	Romania
Grillitsch 6', 42', 44', 53'; Gschweidl 72'	Report

Stadionul Mogoșoaia, Mogoșoaia
Referee: Dejan Jakimovski (Macedonia)

7 June 2014
17:30

Russia	3–1	Romania
Miranchuk 61'; Davydov 76', 80'	Report	Paun-Alexandru 23'

Stadionul Mogoșoaia, Mogoșoaia
Referee: Tomasz Musiał (Poland)
7 June 2014
20:00

Norway	1–3	Austria
Svendsen 64'	Report	Rasner 5'; Puchegger 9'; Bytyqi 43'

Stadionul Buftea, Buftea
Referee: Dejan Jakimovski (Macedonia)

10 June 2014
18:00

Austria	0–0	Russia
	Report

Stadionul Buftea, Buftea
Referee: Eitan Shemeulevitch (Israel)
10 June 2014
18:00

Romania	3–0	Norway
Vînă 28', 90+3'; Mitriță 45'	Report

Stadionul Mogoşoaia, Mogoșoaia
Referee: Tomasz Musiał (Poland)

=== Group 7 ===
Pos	Team	Pld	W	D	L	GF	GA	GD	Pts	Qualification
1	Portugal (H)	3	3	0	0	9	4	+5	9	Final tournament
2	Wales	3	1	1	1	6	4	+2	4	
3	Belgium	3	1	1	1	7	6	+1	4	
4	Greece	3	0	0	3	2	10	−8	0	

(H) Hosts
28 May 2014
17:00

Belgium	1–1	Wales
Marquet 63'	Report	O'Sullivan 38'

Póvoa de Varzim Municipal Stadium, Póvoa de Varzim
Referee: Yaroslav Kozyk (Ukraine)
28 May 2014
19:00

Portugal	3–0	Greece
Rodrigues 78'; Santos 86'; Silva 90+1' (pen.)	Report

Estádio Cidade de Barcelos, Barcelos
Referee: Alain Bieri (Switzerland)

30 May 2014
17:00

Greece	2–4	Belgium
Kritikos 59'; Deligiannidis 61'	Report	Musonda 27', 55'; Schrijvers 63', 89'

Sports Center CF Fão, Fão
Referee: Yaroslav Kozyk (Ukraine)
30 May 2014
18:00

Portugal	3–2	Wales
Silva 20'; Lopes 33'; Luís Rafael 89'	Report	Hedges 76'; O'Sullivan 80'

Estádio do Mar, Matosinhos
Referee: Tihomir Pejin (Croatia)

2 June 2014
19:00

Belgium	2–3	Portugal
Gerkens 34'; Schrijvers 36'	Report	Silva 46', 56'; Santos 86'

Estádio Cidade de Barcelos, Barcelos
Referee: Alain Bieri (Switzerland)
2 June 2014
19:00

Wales	3–0	Greece
O'Sullivan 55' (pen.), 77'; Saunders 69'	Report

Póvoa de Varzim Municipal Stadium, Póvoa de Varzim
Referee: Tihomir Pejin (Croatia)

== Qualified teams ==
Country	Qualified as	Previous appearances in tournament^{1}
Hungary	Hosts	1 (2008)
Ukraine	Group 1 winner	2 (2004, **2009**)
Bulgaria	Group 2 winner	1 (2008)
Israel	Group 3 winner	0 (debut)
Serbia	Group 4 winner	6 (2005, 2007, 2009, 2011, 2012, **2013**)
Germany	Group 5 winner	5 (2002, 2004, 2005, 2007, **2008**)
Austria	Group 6 winner	4 (2003, 2006, 2007, 2010)
Portugal	Group 7 winner	6 (2003, 2006, 2007, 2010, 2012, 2013)

^{1} Only counted appearances for under-19 era (bold indicates champion for that year, while italic indicates hosts)
