= Stav Shushan =

Israeli footballer

Stav Shushan סתיו שושן
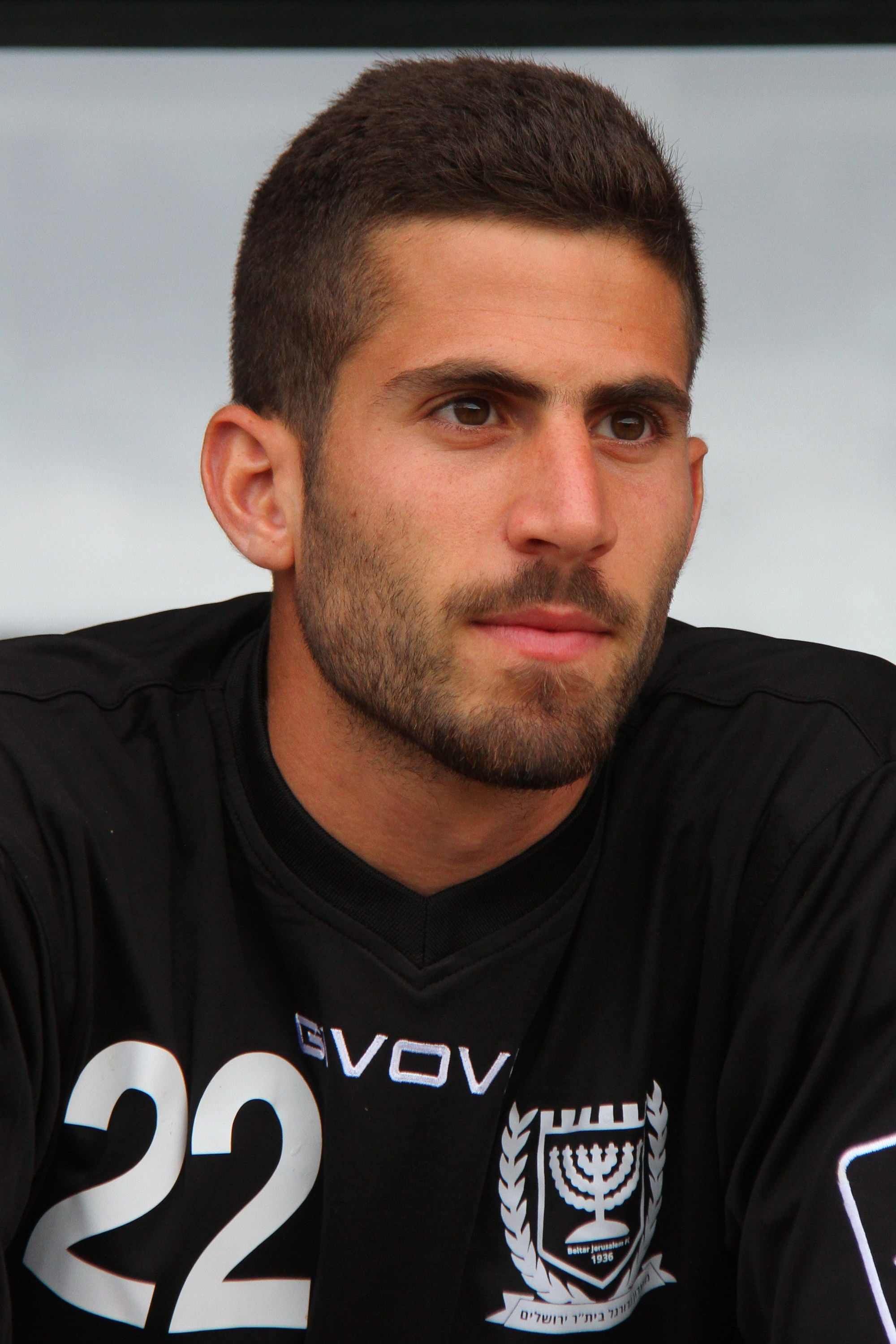
- Shushan with Beitar Jerusalem in 2016

Personal information
- Full name: Stav shushan
- Date of birth: 14 May 1995 (age 31)
- Place of birth: Modi'in-Maccabim-Re'ut, Israel
- Height: 1.86 m (6 ft 1 in)
- Position: Goalkeeper

Youth career
- 2004–2005: Hapoel Jerusalem
- 2005–2008: Beitar Jerusalem
- 2008–2012: Hapoel Rishon LeZion
- 2012–2015: Beitar Jerusalem

Senior career*
Years	Team	Apps	(Gls)
2015–2019	Beitar Jerusalem	7	(0)
2018–2019	→ Sektzia Nes Tziona	0	(0)
- * Club domestic league appearances and goals as of 10 May 2016

Stav Shushan (Hebrew: סתיו שושן; born May 14, 1995) is an Israeli footballer.

== Club career ==
Shushan started playing at the age of 9 with Hapoel Jerusalem, before moving to play for Beitar Jerusalem and Hapoel Rishon LeZion youth teams. Shushan made his debut in the Youth Premier League in October 2011 with Hapoel Rishon LeZion, and between 2012 and 2015 played 42 more matches in the Youth Premier League with Beitar Jerusalem. In 2015, Shushan was promoted to the senior squad as a second goalkeeper, and made his debut in the Israeli Premier League on 9 May 2016, in a match against Hapoel Be'er Sheva, replacing first choice goalkeeper Boris Klaiman, who was sent off at the end of the previous match. On May 22, 2018, Shushan left Beitar Jerusalem.

Shushan was part of the U-19 national team squad to the 2014 U-19 Championship, but didn't play, as goalkeeper Dean Gal played all three matches in the championship.
