= Belarus national under-19 football team =

National U-19 association football team

- Association: Football Federation of Belarus
- Confederation: UEFA (Europe)
- Head coach: Mikhail Markhel
- FIFA code: BLR
First colours	Second colours

UEFA U-19 European Championship
- Appearances: 1 (first in 1994)
- Best result: Group phase (1994)

The Belarus national under-19 football team is the national under-19 football team of Belarus and is controlled by the Football Federation of Belarus. The team competed in the UEFA European Under-19 Football Championship, held every year.

== History ==
Belarus managed to qualify for the final phase of European Under-19 Championship just once, in their inaugural season (1994). They were eliminated in the group stage.

== European Championship record ==
=== Under-18 era ===
UEFA European U-18 Championship record
Year	Round	Position	Pld	W	D	L	GF	GA
1955–1992	Part of Soviet Union							
(England) 1993	Did not enter							
(Spain) 1994	Group phase	8th	3	0	0	3	3	10
(Greece) 1995	Did not qualify							
(France) 1996	Did not qualify							
(Iceland) 1997	Did not qualify							
(Cyprus) 1998	Did not qualify							
(Sweden) 1999	Did not qualify							
(Germany) 2000	Did not qualify							
(Finland) 2001	Did not qualify							
Total	Group phase	1/8	3	0	0	0	3	10

=== Under-19 era ===
UEFA European U-19 Championship record
Year	Round	Position	Pld	W	D	L	GF	GA
(Norway) 2002	Did not qualify							
(Liechtenstein) 2003	Did not qualify							
(Switzerland) 2004	Did not qualify							
(Northern Ireland) 2005	Did not qualify							
(Poland) 2006	Did not qualify							
(Austria) 2007	Did not qualify							
(Czech Republic) 2008	Did not qualify							
(Ukraine) 2009	Did not qualify							
(France) 2010	Did not qualify							
(Romania) 2011	Did not qualify							
(Estonia) 2012	Did not qualify							
(Lithuania) 2013	Did not qualify							
(Hungary) 2014	Did not qualify							
(Greece) 2015	Did not qualify							
(Germany) 2016	Did not qualify							
(Georgia (country)) 2017	Did not qualify							
(Finland) 2018	Did not qualify							
(Armenia) 2019	Did not qualify							
(Northern Ireland) 2020	Cancelled due to the COVID-19 pandemic							
(Romania) 2021	Cancelled due to the COVID-19 pandemic							
(Slovakia) 2022	Did not qualify							
(Malta) 2023	Did not qualify							
(Northern Ireland) 2024	Did not qualify							
(Romania) 2025	Did not qualify							
(Wales) 2026	Did not qualify							
(Israel) 2027	TBD							
Total	n/a	0/12	0	0	0	0	0	0

=== UEFA U-19 Euro 2014 qualification ===
==== Qualifying round ====
Pos	Team	Pld	W	D	L	GF	GA	GD	Pts	Qualification
1	Germany	3	2	1	0	8	2	+6	7	Elite round
2	Scotland	3	1	2	0	3	2	+1	5	Elite round
3	Latvia	3	1	1	1	3	7	−4	4	
4	Belarus (H)	3	0	0	3	2	5	−3	0	

(H) Hosts
10 October 2013
15:00

Germany	2–1	Belarus
Mukhtar 8'; Gnabry 63'	Report	Kaborda 90+4'

Haradski Stadium, Barysaw
Referee: Ilias Spathas (Greece)

12 October 2013
15:00

Belarus	0–1	Scotland
	Report	Johnstone 32'

Haradski Stadium, Barysaw
Referee: István Kovács (Romania)

15 October 2013
13:00

Latvia	2–1	Belarus
Gutkovskis 1'; Vītolnieks 55'	Report	Rassadkin 21'

Haradski Stadium, Barysaw
Referee: Tornike Gvantseladze (Georgia)

== Players ==
=== Current Squad ===
The following players were selected for 2027 UEFA European Under-19 Championship qualification matches against Latvia, San Marino, and Slovakia on 15, 18, and 21 May 2026.

No.	Pos.	Player	Date of birth (age)	Club
12	GK	Aleksandr Aleksandrovich	22 April 2008 (age 18)	(Football Federation of Belarus) Dinamo Minsk
16	GK	Mikhail Klachkovich	19 January 2008 (age 18)	(Football Federation of Belarus) Dinamo Brest
3	DF	Artem Poluyanov	29 February 2008 (age 18)	(Football Federation of Belarus) Isloch
4	DF	Stepan Zhigimont	6 May 2008 (age 18)	(Football Federation of Belarus) Dinamo Minsk
15	DF	Prokhor Sheremet	22 July 2008 (age 18)	(Football Federation of Belarus) Minsk
7	DF	Egor Snapkov	5 March 2008 (age 18)	(Football Federation of Belarus) Unixlabs Minsk
2	MF	Denis Royko	14 August 2008 (age 18)	(Football Federation of Belarus) Energetik-BGU Minsk
14	MF	Sergey Zhivushko (captain)	29 January 2008 (age 18)	(Football Federation of Belarus) Dinamo Minsk
6	MF	Zakhar Drachev	19 April 2008 (age 18)	(Football Federation of Belarus) Minsk
19	MF	Dimitriy Degtyarenko	24 April 2008 (age 18)	(Football Federation of Belarus) Dinamo Minsk
21	MF	Ilya Verenich	28 March 2008 (age 18)	(Football Federation of Belarus) Slavia
18	MF	Vladislav Fezhenko	17 February 2008 (age 18)	(Football Federation of Belarus) Unixlabs Minsk
13	MF	Egor Molchan	13 August 2008 (age 18)	(Football Federation of Belarus) Dinamo Minsk
17	MF	Nikita Titov	3 January 2008 (age 18)	(Football Federation of Belarus) Dinamo Minsk
8	MF	Artur Zablotskiy	3 April 2008 (age 18)	(Football Federation of Belarus) Dinamo Minsk
10	MF	Nikita Kolesnikovich	5 April 2008 (age 18)	(Football Federation of Belarus) Dinamo Minsk
22	MF	Marat Titov	20 November 2009 (age 16)	(Football Federation of Belarus) Akademia ABFF
11	FW	Andrey Lutskovich	24 February 2008 (age 18)	(Football Federation of Belarus) Dinamo Minsk
20	FW	Yan Priemko	27 May 2008 (age 18)	(Polish Football Association) Polonia Warsaw

== See also ==
- Belarus national football team
- Belarus national under-23 football team
- Belarus national under-21 football team
- Belarus national under-17 football team
