= Iceland men's national under-19 football team =

National U-19 association football team

Iceland Under-19
- Nickname: Strákarnir okkar
- Association: Football Association of Iceland
- Head coach: (Iceland) Þórhallur Siggeirsson
First colours	Second colours

First international
- Iceland 1–1 Wales (Reykjavík, Iceland; 13 October 1970)

Biggest win
- Iceland 9–0 Luxembourg (Reykjavík, Iceland; 9 October 1994)

Biggest defeat
- Serbia 6–0 Iceland (Ireland; 30 May 2014)

European Under-19 Football Championship
- Appearances: 1 (first in 2023)
- Best result: Group stage 2023

The Iceland men's national under-19 football team, controlled by the Football Association of Iceland, represents Iceland at the European Under-19 Football Championship and international friendly match fixtures at the under-19 age level.

== European Championships ==
=== Introduction ===
Since it adopted its current format in 2002, the Iceland under-19s have failed to qualify for the UEFA European Under-19 Football Championship. As of 2011, their best qualifying campaign performances came in 2007 and 2008, when they qualified for the second, or 'elite', qualification stage.

In the qualifying campaign for the 2007 tournament, the team finished joint second place in the elite qualification stage behind the Spain under-19s, who went on to win the tournament. In 2008, the Iceland under-19s recorded elite stage victories against the Norway under-19s and the Israel under-19s, but again finished in second place. On that occasion the group winners were the Bulgaria under-19s.

In the 2011 qualification campaign, Iceland finished third in group 1 of the first qualifying stage. Their only points came in a 4–0 victory over the Kazakhstan under-19s, who finished bottom in fourth place.

In the first qualification stage of the 2012 UEFA European Under-19 Football Championship, the Iceland under-19s faced Norway, Latvia and Cyprus, finishing last in the group. Iceland didn't fare much better in 2013, as they came third in the group and didn't qualify. In 2014 they finished second in Group 4 behind Belgium and ahead of both France and Northern Ireland to qualify for the elite round where they lost all three matches.

=== History ===
Year	Result	GP	W	D	L	GS	GA
(Norway) 2002	First qualifying stage						
(Liechtenstein) 2003	First qualifying stage						
(Switzerland) 2004	First qualifying stage						
(Northern Ireland) 2005	First qualifying stage						
(Poland) 2006	First qualifying stage						
(Austria) 2007	First qualifying stage						
(Czech Republic) 2008	First qualifying stage						
(Ukraine) 2009	First qualifying stage						
(France) 2010	First qualifying stage						
(Romania) 2011	First qualifying stage						
(Estonia) 2012	First qualifying stage						
(Lithuania) 2013	First qualifying stage						
(Hungary) 2014	First qualifying stage						
(Greece) 2015	First qualifying stage						
(Germany) 2016	First qualifying stage						
(Georgia (country)) 2017	First qualifying stage						
(Finland) 2018	First qualifying stage						
(Armenia) 2019	First qualifying stage						
(Northern Ireland) ~~2020~~	Postponed, rescheduled, and then cancelled due to the COVID-19 pandemic in Europe.						
(Romania) ~~2021~~	Cancelled due to the COVID-19 pandemic in Europe.						
(Slovakia) 2022	Elite round						
(Malta) 2023	Group stage	3	0	2	1	2	3
(Northern Ireland) 2024	Did not qualify						
(Romania) 2025	Did not qualify						
(Wales) 2026	Did not qualify						
(Czech Republic) 2027	TBD						
(Bulgaria) 2028	TBD						
(Netherlands) 2029	TBD						
Total	1/20	3	0	2	1	2	3

== Players ==
=== Current squad ===
The following players were called up for 2027 UEFA European Under-19 Championship qualification matches against Montenegro and Georgia on 6 and 9 June 2026.

No.	Pos.	Player	Date of birth (age)	Club
1	GK	Gylfi Berg Snæhólm	21 September 2008 (age 18)	(Football Association of Iceland) Breiðablik
12	GK	Sigurður Ingvason	26 March 2008 (age 18)	(Danish Football Association) Midtjylland
4	DF	Ásbjörn Líndal Arnarsson	14 February 2008 (age 18)	(Football Association of Iceland) Þór
5	DF	Styrmir Jóhann Ellertsson	28 July 2008 (age 18)	(Football Association of Iceland) ÍA
3	DF	Egill Orri Arnarsson	21 March 2008 (age 18)	(Danish Football Association) Midtjylland
13	DF	Birkir Hrafn Samúelsson	19 March 2008 (age 18)	(Football Association of Iceland) Kári
2	DF	Sverrir Páll Ingason	5 November 2008 (age 18)	(Football Association of Iceland) Þór
6	MF	Einar Freyr Halldórsson	16 September 2008 (age 18)	(Football Association of Iceland) Þór
15	MF	Eysteinn Rúnarsson	27 May 2008 (age 18)	(Football Association of Iceland) Grindavík
14	MF	Kristinn Narfi Björgvinsson	13 October 2008 (age 18)	(Football Association of Iceland) Breiðablik
16	MF	Jón Breki Guðmundsson	15 February 2008 (age 18)	(Football Association of Iceland) ÍA
19	MF	Gunnleifur Orri Gunnleifsson	9 May 2008 (age 18)	(Football Association of Iceland) Grindavík
18	MF	Þorvaldur Smári Jónsson	4 June 2008 (age 18)	(Football Association of Iceland) HK
20	MF	Gísli Snær Weywadt Gíslason	3 January 2008 (age 18)	(Football Association of Iceland) Stjarnan
8	MF	Helgi Jóhannsson	7 July 2008 (age 18)	(Danish Football Association) AaB
10	FW	Tómas Óli Kristjánsson	27 February 2008 (age 18)	(Danish Football Association) AGF
7	FW	Gunnar Olsen	15 March 2008 (age 18)	(Danish Football Association) Copenhagen
11	FW	Alexander Ingi Arnarsson	17 July 2008 (age 18)	(Swedish Football Association) Malmö
9	FW	Gabríel Snær Gunnarsson	23 July 2008 (age 18)	(Football Association of Iceland) ÍA
17	FW	Ásgeir Steinn Steinarsson	12 March 2008 (age 18)	(Football Association of Iceland) FH

=== Recent call-ups ===
The following players have been called up within the last twelve months and remain available for future selection.

Pos.	Player	Date of birth (age)	Caps	Goals	Club	Latest call-up

== See also ==
- Iceland men's national football team
- Iceland men's national under-21 football team
- Iceland men's national under-17 football team
- Iceland women's national football team
