= Adamenko =

Adamenko is a Ukrainian language last name derived from the given name Adam. The Russian-language spelling is the same, Belarusian: Adamenka.

Notable people with the last name include:

- Aleksandr Adamenko, Belarusian association football player who participated in the 2013 Belarusian Super Cup
- Maksym Adamenko, Ukrainian association football player who plays for Lithuanian club FK Kruoja Pakruojis
- Mykyta Adamenko, Ukrainian association football player who participated in the 2014 UEFA European Under-19 Championship
- Stanislav Adamenko, one of the designers of chandeliers in the Zoloti Vorota metro station in Kyiv, Ukraine
- Vasily Adamenko, a World War II Hero of the Soviet Union
- Viktor Adamenko, Belarusian scientist who wrote a dissertation on Kirlian photography
