= Provisional National Government of the Southwestern Caucasus =

Former nominally-independent provisional government

Provisional National Government of the Southwestern Caucasus Cenûb-i Garbî Kafkas Hükûmet-i Muvakkate-i Millîyesi Güneybatı Kafkas Geçici Milli Hükûmeti
- 1918–1919
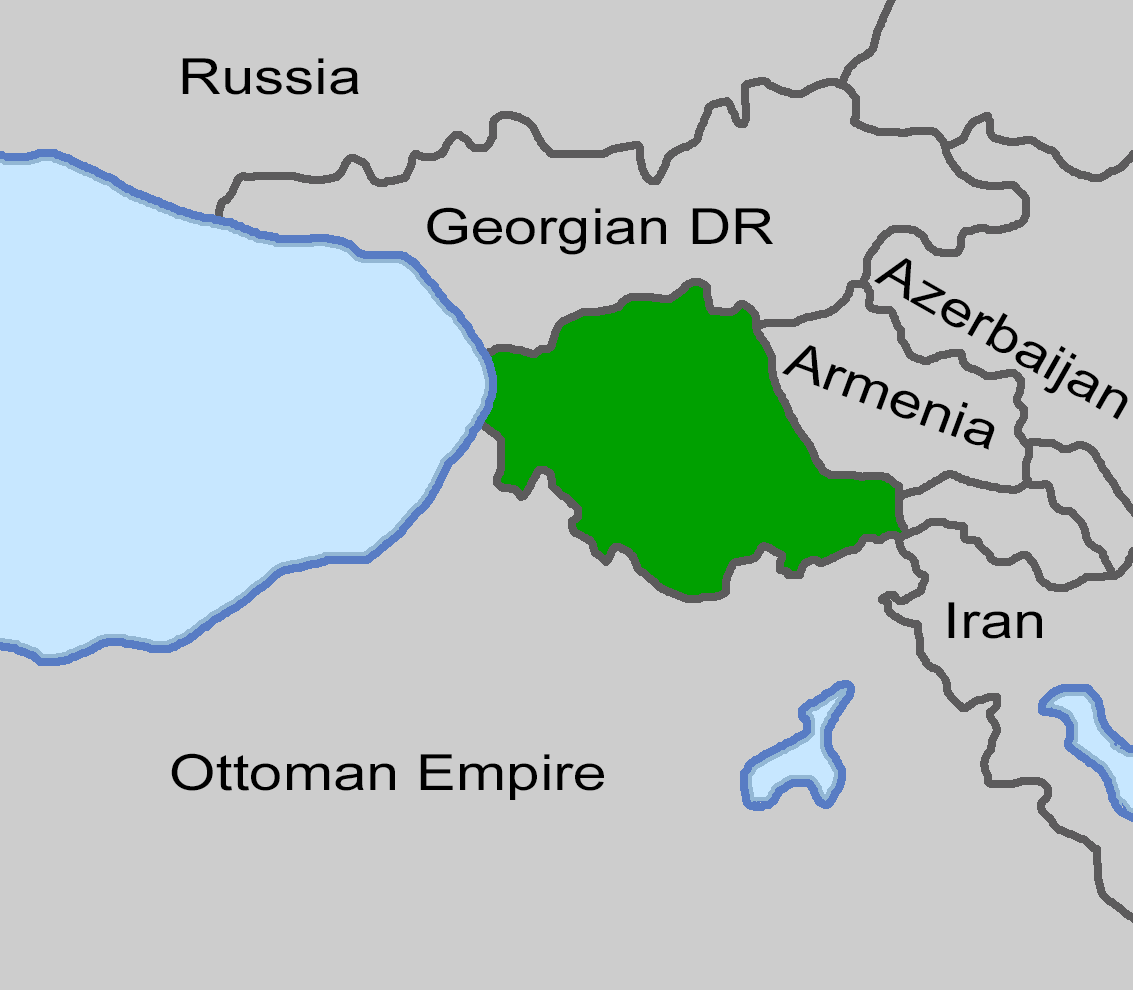
- Status: Provisional government
- Capital: Kars
- Common languages: Ottoman Turkish
- Government: Republic
- President
- Historical era: World War I
  - Partition: 1 December 1918
  - British occupation: 19 April 1919
- Currency: Kuruş; Lira
Preceded by
Caucasus Viceroyalty (1844–1881)
Succeeded by
Democratic Republic of Armenia
Democratic Republic of Georgia
Azerbaijan Democratic Republic
Turkey
- Today part of: Turkey; Georgia; Azerbaijan; Armenia

The Provisional National Government of the Southwestern Caucasus, Provisional National Government of South West Caucasia (Modern Turkish: Güneybatı Kafkas Geçici Milli Hükûmeti; Ottoman Turkish: Cenub-ı Garbi Kafkas Hükûmet-i Muvakkate-i Milliyesi Azerbaijani: Cənub-Qərbi Qafqaz Cümhuriyyəti) or Kars Republic was a short-lived nominally-independent provisional government based in Kars, northeastern Turkey. Born in the wake of the Armistice of Mudros that ended World War I in the Middle East, it existed from December 1, 1918 until April 19, 1919, when it was abolished by British High Commissioner Admiral Somerset Arthur Gough-Calthorpe. A similar provisional government named Igdir National Government was also founded on Iğdır.

The government, headed by Fahrettin Pirioğlu, considered its territory to be the predominantly Muslim-inhabited regions of Kars and Batumi, parts of Yerevan province and the Akhaltsikhe and Akhalkalaki districts of Tiflis province. In practical terms, however, the government was confined to Kars province and existed alongside the British governorship created during the Entente's intervention in the South Caucasus.

== Background ==
The terms of the Armistice of Mudros signed on 30 October 1918 by the Allies and the Ottomans required the armed forces of the Ottoman Empire to withdraw from all territory belonging to Russia in the Caucasus and to return to the west of the pre-war border with Russia. By 4 December 1918, Ottoman forces had retired as far as the old pre-1877 frontier with Russia, but they delayed leaving Kars Oblast for a further two months.

This delay had the effect of allowing time to set up a pro-Turkish provisional government to resist the expected incorporation of the historically-Armenian province into the Armenian Republic proclaimed in May 1918. "National Islamic Councils" formed in the main population centers of Kars province – Oltu, Kagizman, Igdir, Sarikamis, Ardahan and Kars itself – as well as in settlements in adjoining territories where there were Turkish-speaking or Muslim populations (including Akhalkalaki, Akhaltzikhe and Batumi).

The most significant council, the "Kars Islamic Council", dated from 5 November 1918. In December it changed its name to the "National Council", and in January 1919 to the "Kars National Council", before finally settling on the "Provisional National Government of South-West Caucasia" in March 1919. It claimed authority over all of Kars province together with all Turkish or Muslim-populated areas between Batumi and Nakhchivan. Other than Azerbaijan, this amounted to most of the territory which the Ottoman army had evacuated.

== Establishment ==
The majority of the people in the southwestern part of Transcaucasia were Muslims and sought affiliation with Azerbaijan. Georgia, however, blocked Azerbaijan's incorporation of Muslims in the southwest, which would have extended its frontiers to the Black Sea. As a result, on September 27, 1918, the Muslim National Committee under the leadership of Esad Oktay Bey was formed in Kars, which advocated an autonomy or independence similar to that of the newly formed republics of Armenia, Azerbaijan and Georgia.

On December 1, 1918, in congress in Kars, the Muslim National Committee unilaterally declared an independent South-Western Caucasian Republic (Cenubî Garbi Kafkas Cumhuriyeti) and elected Cihangirzade Ibrahim Bey as its president. The new republic laid claims to the districts of Kars, Batum, Akhaltsikh, Akhalkalaki, Sharur and Nakhichevan, a claim supported by Azerbaijan. It extended full rights to all except Armenians and received assurances from the British about the protection against the claims by Georgia and Armenia on its territory until the question would be decided by the Paris Peace Conference.

On January 13, 1919, a delegation of 60 Armenians were sent to Kars by the British Command in Batum to install an Armenian politician, Stepan Korganov, as the governor of Kars. The Parliament of the Republic rejected this proposal and refused further negotiation with the Armenians. Incidents of violence between the parties then increased dramatically.

During January 1919, the Republic held democratic elections leading to the formation of a parliament on January 14. The parliament consisted of 64 members, elected at a ratio of one deputy per 10,000 voters, including 60 Muslims, three Greeks and one Molokan Russian.

The Parliament of the new republic assembled on January 17 and adopted an eighteen-article constitution (Teskilâtı Esasiye Kanunu). Women were granted voting rights, Kars was declared the capital city and Turkish proclaimed the official language. On March 27, the parliament approved the new government. The new government also applied the Imperial Government of Japan for recognition.

== Dissolution ==
As fighting broke out between the South-Western Caucasian Republic and both Georgia and Armenia, British troops, dispatched from Batum on orders from General William M. Thomson, occupied Kars on April 19, 1919, broke up a parliamentary meeting and arrested thirty parliamentarians and government members. Eleven of the arrested were deported to Batum and then Istanbul, before being exiled to Malta on 2 June. Kars province was placed under Armenian rule and, on July 7, 1920, the Georgian army replaced the British in Batum, who had controlled it since the Turkish withdrawal.

The eleven Malta exiles from the Republic were:

Malta exiles
#	Name	Exile date	Exile number	Role
1	Aziz Cihangiroğlu	June 2, 1919	27 19	Justice Minister
2	Alibeyzade Mehmet Bey	June 2, 1919	27 16	Civil Governor
3	Hasan Han Cihangiroğlu	June 2, 1919	27 18	Defense Minister
4	İbrahim Cihangiroğlu	June 2, 1919	27 17	Parliament leader
5	Mehmetoğlu Muhlis Bey	June 2, 1919	27 27	Communication (postal-telegram-telephone) chief
6	Matroi Radjinski	June 2, 1919	27 25	Russian Member of the Parliament
7	Musa Salah Bey	June 2, 1919	27 20	Police chief
8	Pavlo Camusev	June 2, 1919	27 14	Greek Member of the Parliament
9	Tauchitgin Memlejeff	June 2, 1919	27 22	Interior Minister
10	Stefani Vafiades	June 2, 1919	27 26	Social help minister
11	Yusufoğlu Yusuf Bey	June 2, 1919	27 21	Food Minister

== Aftermath ==
After the treaties concluding the Turkish–Armenian War, the present-day Kars Province and adjacent districts constituting the modern-day Ardahan and Iğdır provinces became part of Turkey.

== Timeline ==
- March 1878: Kars annexed by Russia from the Ottoman Empire.
- March 3, 1918: Russia evacuates Kars under provisions of Treaty of Brest-Litovsk.
- April 14, 1918: Ottoman occupation of Kars region.
- October 30, 1918: The Armistice of Mudros ended the hostilities in Middle Eastern theatre of World War I
- October 30, 1918: Departure of Ottoman Army from Caucasus.
- December 1, 1918: South-Western Caucasian Republic proclaimed with capital at Kars.
- January 13, 1919: Armenians from Democratic Republic of Armenia sent to Kars.
- April 10, 1919: Abolished by High Commissioner Admiral Somerset Arthur Gough-Calthorpe.
- April 19, 1919: General William M. Thomson occupied Kars region.
- April 20, 1919: Troops of the Democratic Republic of Georgia gain control of Artvin.

== In popular culture ==
Rus Kızı Vasilisa ("Russian girl Vasilisa"), a dissident history by Erkan Karagöz published in 2002, portrays the short life of the Republic in the context of a love story.

== See also ==
- Treaty of Alexandropol
- Treaty of Kars
- Turkish War of Independence
- Chronology of the Turkish War of Independence

== Sources ==
- (in Russian) Zavriev D.S. Modern History of North-Western Vilayets of Turkey. Tbilisi, 1947. p. 377
- (in Turkish) Erkan Karagöz TÜRK ANAYASA HAREKETLERI VE 1919 CENUB-i GARB-i KAFKAS CUMHURIYETI ANAYASASI.
- (in Turkish) Documents and bibliography relating to the South West Caucasian Republic by the Turkish Grand National Assembly.
