= Alexander Joppich =

Austrian footballer (born 1995)

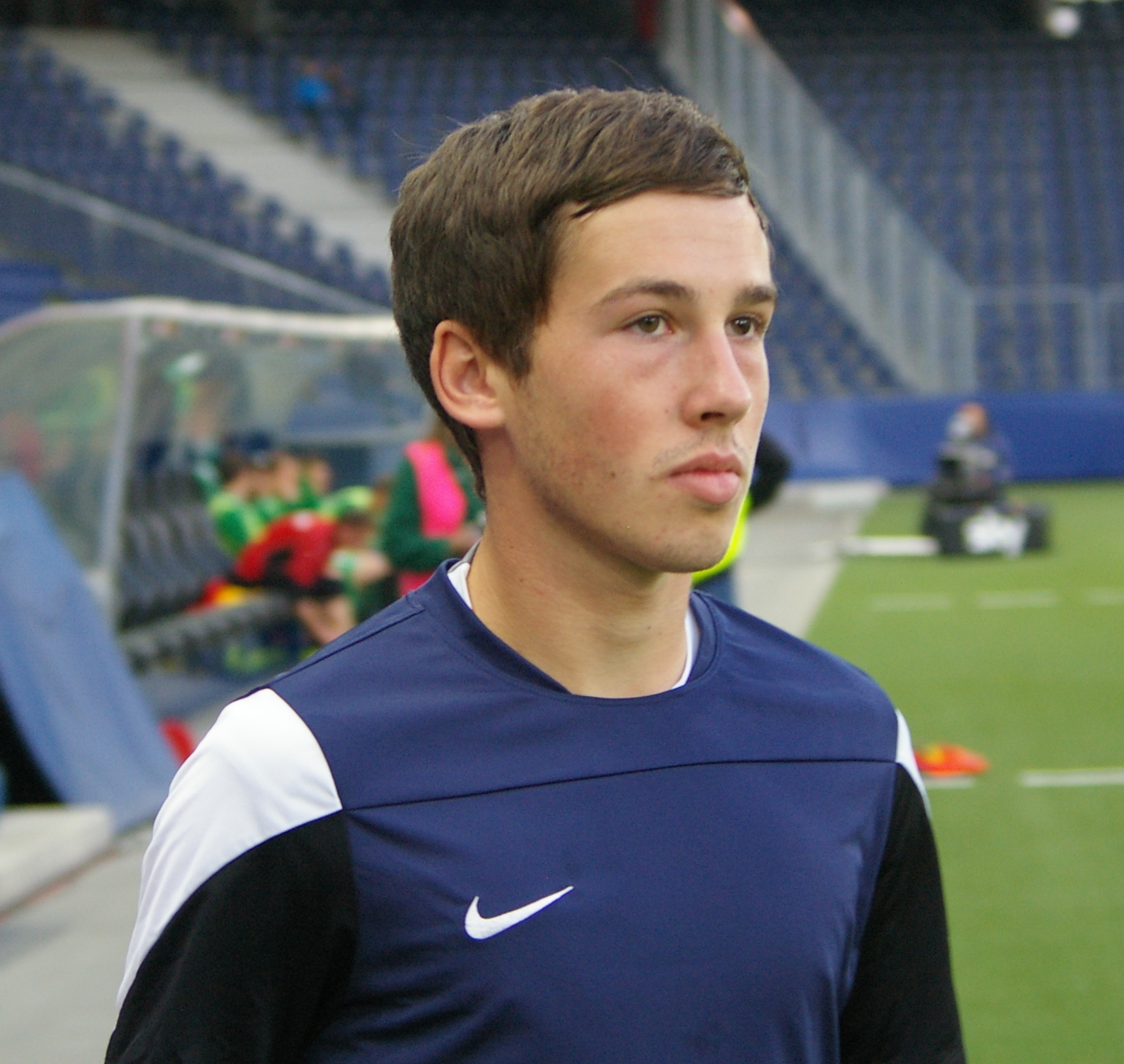
- Joppich with FC Liefering in 2014

Personal information
- Date of birth: 19 January 1995 (age 31)
- Place of birth: Hall in Tirol, Austria
- Height: 1.71 m (5 ft 7 in)
- Position: Left-back

Team information
- Current team: FC Wacker Innsbruck
- Number: 16

Youth career
- 2002–2007: FC Raika Volders
- 2007–2008: FC Wacker Innsbruck
- 2008–2009: FC Raika Volders
- 2009–2013: AKA Tirol

Senior career*
| Years | Team | Apps | (Gls) |
| 2013 | FC Wacker Innsbruck II | 10 | (2) |
| 2013–2014 | FC Augsburg II | 4 | (0) |
| 2014–2016 | FC Liefering | 31 | (0) |
| 2016–2018 | Austria Lustenau | 30 | (0) |
| 2018–2019 | FC Wacker Innsbruck II | 26 | (0) |
| 2019–2022 | FC Wacker Innsbruck | 71 | (3) |
| 2022–2024 | SV Horn | 51 | (2) |
| 2024– | FC Wacker Innsbruck | 54 | (2) |

International career
| 2013–2014 | Austria U19 | 9 | (0) |
| 2015 | Austria U20 | 5 | (0) |
- * Club domestic league appearances and goals as of 26 June 2026

Alexander Joppich (born 19 January 1995) is an Austrian professional footballer who plays as left-back for 2. Liga club FC Wacker Innsbruck.

== Club career ==
He made his Austrian Football First League debut for FC Liefering on 12 September 2014 in a game against SV Mattersburg.

On 14 June 2022, Joppich signed a two-year contract with 2. Liga club SV Horn.
