= Cihangirzade İbrahim Bey =

Turkish and Azerbaijani politician (1874–1948)

1st President of the Provisional National Government of the Southwestern Caucasus
- In office January 1919 – April 1919

Mayor of Kars
- In office 1921–1927

Personal details
- Born: 1874
- Died: 1948 (aged 73–74)
- Profession: Military officer, statesman, administrator

Cihangirzade İbrahim Bey (1874–1948), known as İbrahim Aydın after the 1934 Surname Law in Turkey, was an Azerbaijani-Turkish military officer, statesman, and administrator who served the Ottoman Empire and after its defeat in World War I, became the leader of the Turkish revolutionaries in his native Kars and in southwest Caucasia. After the Armistice of Mudros, he led the First Congress of Ardahan, establishing a local administration, and was later declared the head of the Southwest Caucasian National Resistance Government on 30 November 1918. This movement took control of the cities of Kars, Ardahan, and Batum in late 1918.

In the Second Congress of Ardahan, held between 7 and 9 January 1919, Cihangirzade Ibrahim Bey was elected as the First President of the Provisional National Government of the Southwestern Caucasus.

Cihangirzade worked for the recognition of the republic and the independence of its territory. On 19 April 1919, the capital of the republic, Kars, was occupied by the British troops under the command of General William M. Thomson and after a period of local resistance he was arrested by the British forces and sent, through Batum and Istanbul, to a one-year exile in Malta (see Malta exiles) together with 11 members of his cabinet.

After his return from Malta, he served as mayor of Kars between 1921 and 1927. He died in 1948.

A cenotaph to his memory was erected in Kars in 2003 and a municipal park in the city carries his name.

== See also ==
- Provisional National Government of the Southwestern Caucasus
