= Vladislav Kaborda =

Belarusian footballer

Personal information
- Date of birth: 24 July 1995 (age 31)
- Place of birth: Minsk, Belarus
- Height: 1.72 m (5 ft 8 in)
- Position: Defender

Youth career
- 2011–2014: Minsk

Senior career*
| Years | Team | Apps | (Gls) |
| 2012–2014 | Minsk | 0 | (0) |
| 2012 | → Minsk-2 | 10 | (0) |
| 2014 | → Minsk-2 | 21 | (0) |
| 2015 | Smolevichi-STI | 20 | (0) |
| 2016 | Torpedo Minsk | 11 | (0) |
| 2016 | Oshmyany | 11 | (0) |
| 2017 | Baranovichi | 14 | (0) |
| 2017–2018 | Palanga | 32 | (0) |
| 2020–2021 | Smorgon | 40 | (0) |

International career
| 2011–2012 | Belarus U17 | 4 | (0) |
| 2013 | Belarus U19 | 3 | (1) |
- * Club domestic league appearances and goals as of 31 December 2021

Vladislav Kaborda (Belarusian: Уладзіслаў Каборда; Russian: Владислав Каборда; born 24 July 1995) is a Belarusian professional footballer.
