= Anthony Syhre =

German footballer (born 1995)

Personal information
- Date of birth: 18 March 1995 (age 31)
- Place of birth: Berlin, Germany
- Height: 1.86 m (6 ft 1 in)
- Position: Centre-back

Team information
- Current team: SV Horn
- Number: 13

Youth career
- Nordberliner SC
- –2007: SC Heiligensee
- 2007–2012: Hertha BSC

Senior career*
| Years | Team | Apps | (Gls) |
| 2012–2015 | Hertha BSC II | 62 | (3) |
| 2012–2015 | Hertha BSC | 0 | (0) |
| 2015–2017 | VfL Osnabrück | 66 | (4) |
| 2017–2019 | Würzburger Kickers | 37 | (0) |
| 2019 | Fortuna Sittard | 1 | (0) |
| 2020–2021 | Hallescher FC | 22 | (3) |
| 2022 | FSV Zwickau | 4 | (0) |
| 2023 | Greifswalder FC | 14 | (2) |
| 2023–2024 | SpVgg Bayreuth | 33 | (0) |
| 2024– | SV Horn | 26 | (0) |

International career
| 2009–2010 | Germany U15 | 2 | (0) |
| 2012–2013 | Germany U18 | 6 | (0) |
| 2013–2014 | Germany U19 | 14 | (1) |
| 2014–2015 | Germany U20 | 2 | (0) |
Medal record
Representing Germany
UEFA European Under-19 Championship
| Winner | 2014 Hungary |
- * Club domestic league appearances and goals as of 12 June 2025

Anthony Syhre (born 18 March 1995) is a German professional footballer who plays as a centre-back for Austrian club SV Horn.

== Club career ==
Syhre started playing football with local Berlin clubs Nordberliner SC and SC Heiligensee. In 2007, he joined the youth ranks of Hertha BSC where he eventually made it into second team, playing in fourth tier Regionalliga Nordost. Remarkably, he was directly promoted from the under-17 to the second team by skipping to play for the under-19 squad.

In early October 2012, he was for the first time close to being called up for a senior team match. However, he wasn't even chosen as a potential substitute and did not receive his first and only call for the first team until 25 March 2014, when he was an on the bench in a Bundesliga match versus Bayern Munich. In July 2015, he made the move to leave his native Berlin for 3. Liga side VfL Osnabrück signing a contract until 2017.

On 31 January 2022, Syhre joined 3. Liga club FSV Zwickau.

== International career ==
Syhre was a member of the Germany under-20 team. Previously he also played for the under-19 team, where he was part of the winning squad at the 2014 European Championships, and the under-18 and under-15 teams.

== Honours ==
Germany U19

- UEFA Under-19 Championship: 2014

Individual

- Fritz Walter Medal U18 Bronze: 2013
