= Žarko Grbović =

Montenegrin footballer

Personal information
- Date of birth: 20 May 1995 (age 31)
- Place of birth: Nikšić, FR Yugoslavia
- Height: 1.83 m (6 ft 0 in)
- Position: Winger

Team information
- Current team: FK Iskra Danilovgrad

Senior career*
Years	Team	Apps	(Gls)
2011–2015	Mogren	53	(10)
2014	→ Twente (loan)	0	(0)
2015–2016	Sutjeska	24	(1)
2016–2017	Toledo	6	(0)
2017	→ Rayo Vallecano B (loan)	0	(0)
2017–2018	Rad	3	(0)
2018–2019	Sutjeska	14	(0)
2020–2021	Kom	4	(0)
2021-	FK Iskra Danilovgrad	0	(0)

International career^{‡}
	Montenegro U17	3	(0)
2012–2014	Montenegro U19	9	(2)
2012–	Montenegro U21	2	(0)
- * Club domestic league appearances and goals as of 8 September 2018 ‡ National team caps and goals as of 6 March 2018

Žarko Grbović (Cyrillic: Жарко Грбовић, born 20 May 1995) is a Montenegrin football player who plays for Montenegrin club FK Iskra Danilovgrad as a winger.

== Club career ==
Born in Nikšić, Grbović made his professional debut with Mogren in the Montenegrin First League in 2011. In January 2014, he was loaned to Dutch side FC Twente at the age of 18, where he was deployed in the youth team. Over the course of the 2014-15 season, he scored a total of 8 goals over 24 games played at the age of 20. Although Mogren ended up regulated into the second tier, Grbović was offered a trial with Spanish club Valencia.

After unsuccessful loan spells from Mogren, Grbović joined Sutjeska in 2015. He then moved to Spain and signed with CD Toledo in summer 2016. He played with Toledo the first half of the season at 2016–17 Segunda División B and then was loaned to Rayo Vallecano B and played the second half of season at 2016–17 Tercera División. In summer 2017 he joined Serbian club FK Rad.

== International career ==
Grbović represented Montenegro at U-17, U-19 and U-21 levels.
