= 2014 UEFA European Under-19 Championship =

Soccer championship

2014-es U19-es labdarúgó-Európa-bajnokság

Tournament details
- Host country: Hungary
- Dates: 19–31 July
- Teams: 8 (from 1 confederation)
- Venues: 4 (in 4 host cities)

Final positions
- Champions: Germany (3rd title)
- Runners-up: Portugal

Tournament statistics
- Matches played: 15
- Goals scored: 41 (2.73 per match)
- Attendance: 32,106 (2,140 per match)
- Top scorer(s): (Germany) Davie Selke (6 goals)
- Best player: (Germany) Davie Selke

The 2014 UEFA European Under-19 Championship was the 13th edition of the UEFA European Under-19 Championship since its reclassification from an under-18 event in 2002, and the 63rd since the tournament was created in 1948. Hungary was chosen to host the final tournament, which was staged from 19 to 31 July 2014 in four cities – Budapest, Felcsút, Győr and Pápa. It was the second time (first in the under-19 era) that the country held this tournament, having previously hosted it in 1990. Players born after 1 January 1995 were eligible to participate in this competition.

Qualification matches began in September 2013 and concluded in June 2014, with seven teams joining the hosts in the final tournament. Among them were the defending champions, Serbia, who defeated France 1–0 in the previous final to secure their first-ever title in UEFA competitions.

The best three teams from each group at the final tournament qualified for the 2015 FIFA U-20 World Cup in New Zealand.

Germany defeated Portugal 1–0 in the final to capture their third title.

== Venues ==
Map of the final tournament venues

The final tournament matches were held in four stadium venues located in four cities:

Stadium	Location	Capacity	Matches	Ref
Ferenc Szusza Stadium	Budapest	12,700	3 group stage matches, 1 semi-final and final	
Pancho Arena	Felcsút	3,672	3 group stage matches and 1 semi-final	
ETO Park	Győr	13,772	3 group stage matches	
Perutz Stadion	Pápa	3,118	3 group stage matches	

== Qualification ==
Qualification for the final tournament occurred in two phases: a qualifying round and an elite round. During these rounds, 53 national teams competed to determine the seven teams that would join the automatically qualified host team, Hungary.

The qualifying round was played between 6 September and 19 November 2013, following a draw that took place on 5 December 2012 at the UEFA headquarters in Nyon, Switzerland. According to the UEFA under-19 national team coefficient ranking, the top seeded team, Spain, was given a bye to the elite round, whereas the remaining 52 teams were divided into two pots and drawn into 13 groups of four teams. Each group included two teams from both pots and was contested as a round-robin tournament, hosted by one of the group teams. The group winners and runners-up, along with the best third-placed team, qualified for the next round.

The elite round was played between 24 May and 10 June 2014 and was contested by the 27 teams advancing from the qualifying round plus Spain. The draw took place on 28 November 2013 at the UEFA headquarters and allocated the 28 teams – previously arranged into four seeding pots according to their qualifying round coefficient (Spain were automatically seeded in the first pot) – into seven groups of four. Each group was contested similarly to the qualifying round, with the seven group winners securing qualification for the final tournament.

=== Qualified teams ===
The following eight teams qualified for the final tournament:

Country	Qualified as	Previous appearances in tournament^{1}
Hungary	Hosts	1 (2008)
Ukraine	Group 1 winner	2 (2004, **2009**)
Bulgaria	Group 2 winner	1 (2008)
Israel	Group 3 winner	0 (debut)
Serbia	Group 4 winner	6 (2005^{2}, 2007, 2009, 2011, 2012, **2013**)
Germany	Group 5 winner	5 (2002, 2004, 2005, 2007, **2008**)
Austria	Group 6 winner	4 (2003, 2006, 2007, 2010)
Portugal	Group 7 winner	6 (2003, 2006, 2007, 2010, 2012, 2013)

^{1} Only counted appearances for under-19 era (bold indicates champion for that year, while italic indicates hosts)
^{2} As Serbia and Montenegro

== Match officials ==
UEFA named six referees and eight assistant referees to officiate matches at the final tournament. Additionally, two referees from the host nation were chosen as fourth officials.

Referees

- Kevin Clancy (Scotland)
- Xavier Fernández (Spain)
- Tore Hansen (Norway)
- Enea Jorgji (Albania)
- Stephan Klossner (Switzerland)
- István Kovács (Romania)

Assistant referees

- Yashar Abbasov (Azerbaijan)
- Yevgeniy Belskiy (Kazakhstan)
- Laurent Conotte (Belgium)
- Darren England (England)
- Henrik Larsen (Denmark)
- (Republic of Ireland) Wayne McDonnell (Ireland)
- Ivo Nádvorník (Czech Republic)
- Gylfi Már Sigurðsson (Iceland)

Fourth officials

- Tamás Bognár (Hungary)
- Mihály Fábián (Hungary)

== Group stage ==
2014 UEFA European Under-19 Championship teams and final classification

The draw for the group stage was held on 19 June 2014 at the Pancho Arena in Felcsút, and was conducted by the UEFA Youth and Amateur Football Committee chairman, Jim Boyce, who was assisted by former Hungary national team coach and final tournament ambassador Kálmán Mészöly.

The eight finalists were drawn into two groups of four teams (as hosts, Hungary were seeded in group A), where they played matches against each other in a round-robin system. The top two teams from each group advanced to the semi-finals.

Tie-breaking

If two or more teams were equal on points on completion of the group matches, the following tie-breaking criteria were applied:

1. Higher number of points obtained in the matches played between the teams in question;
2. Superior goal difference resulting from the matches played between the teams in question;
3. Higher number of goals scored in the matches played between the teams in question;

If, after having applied criteria 1 to 3, teams still had an equal ranking, criteria 1 to 3 were reapplied exclusively to the matches between the teams in question to determine their final rankings. If this procedure did not lead to a decision, criteria 4 to 7 were applied.

4. Superior goal difference in all group matches;
5. Higher number of goals scored in all group matches;
6. Respect Fair play ranking of the teams in question (final tournament);
7. Drawing of lots.

If only two teams were tied (according to criteria 1–7) after having met in the last match of the group stage, their ranking would be determined by a penalty shoot-out.

All times are in Central European Summer Time (UTC+02:00).

=== Group A ===
Pos	Team	Pld	W	D	L	GF	GA	GD	Pts	Qualification
1	Portugal	3	3	0	0	11	2	+9	9	Knockout stage and 2015 FIFA U-20 World Cup
2	Austria	3	2	0	1	7	3	+4	6	Knockout stage and 2015 FIFA U-20 World Cup
3	Hungary (H)	3	1	0	2	4	10	−6	3	2015 FIFA U-20 World Cup
4	Israel	3	0	0	3	1	8	−7	0	

(H) Hosts
19 July 2014
18:00

Portugal	3–0	Israel
Lopes 39', 78'; Silva 64'	Report

Pancho Arena, Felcsút
Attendance: 397
Referee: István Kovács (Romania)
19 July 2014
18:30

Hungary	1–3	Austria
Varga 60'	Report	Bytyqi 15' (pen.); Blutsch 18'; Michorl 48'

Ferenc Szusza Stadium, Budapest
Attendance: 9,762
Referee: Xavier Fernández (Spain)

22 July 2014
18:00

Austria	3–0	Israel
Bytyqi 28' (pen.); Grillitsch 42'; Grubeck 73'	Report

Ferenc Szusza Stadium, Budapest
Attendance: 456
Referee: Enea Jorgji (Albania)
22 July 2014
20:30

Hungary	1–6	Portugal
Mervó 73'	Report	Rodrigues 32' (pen.); Silva 45', 66', 89', 90+2'; Martins 75'

Pancho Arena, Felcsút
Attendance: 3,695
Referee: Tore Hansen (Norway)

25 July 2014
18:00

Israel	1–2	Hungary
Hugy 36'	Report	Kalmár 25'; Balogh 39'

Ferenc Szusza Stadium, Budapest
Attendance: 3,945
Referee: Kevin Clancy (Scotland)
25 July 2014
18:00

Austria	1–2	Portugal
Grillitsch 46'	Report	Podstawski 41'; Baldé 86'

Pancho Arena, Felcsút
Attendance: 954
Referee: Stephan Klossner (Switzerland)

=== Group B ===
Pos	Team	Pld	W	D	L	GF	GA	GD	Pts	Qualification
1	Germany	3	2	1	0	7	2	+5	7	Knockout stage and 2015 FIFA U-20 World Cup
2	Serbia	3	1	2	0	4	3	+1	5	Knockout stage and 2015 FIFA U-20 World Cup
3	Ukraine	3	1	1	1	2	3	−1	4	2015 FIFA U-20 World Cup
4	Bulgaria	3	0	0	3	0	5	−5	0	

19 July 2014
17:15

Ukraine	1–1	Serbia
Burda 1'	Report	Maksimović 7'

ETO Park, Győr
Attendance: 300
Referee: Stephan Klossner (Switzerland)
19 July 2014
20:15

Bulgaria	0–3	Germany
	Report	Selke 1', 56'; Syhre 28'

ETO Park, Győr
Attendance: 500
Referee: Kevin Clancy (Scotland)

22 July 2014
18:00

Germany	2–2	Serbia
Selke 39'; Stark 90+1'	Report	Maksimović 32'; Jović 41'

Perutz Stadion, Pápa
Attendance: 1,500
Referee: Xavier Fernández (Spain)
22 July 2014
21:00

Bulgaria	0–1	Ukraine
	Report	Tankovskyi 89'

Perutz Stadion, Pápa
Attendance: 300
Referee: István Kovács (Romania)

25 July 2014
20:15

Serbia	1–0	Bulgaria
Mandić 90'	Report

Perutz Stadion, Pápa
Attendance: 200
Referee: Enea Jorgji (Albania)
25 July 2014
20:15

Germany	2–0	Ukraine
Selke 3', 66'	Report

ETO Park, Győr
Attendance: 650
Referee: Tore Hansen (Norway)

== Knockout stage ==
In the knockout stage, extra time and a penalty shoot-out were used to decide the winner if necessary.

=== Bracket ===
Semi-finals
28 July
Portugal (p)	0 (4)
Serbia	0 (3)
28 July
Germany	4
Austria	0

Final
31 July
Portugal	0
Germany	1

=== Semifinals ===
28 July 2014
18:00

Germany	4–0	Austria
Selke 20'; Stendera 30'; Öztunalı 58'; Mukhtar 68'	Report

Ferenc Szusza Stadium, Budapest
Attendance: 923
Referee: Kevin Clancy (Scotland)

28 July 2014
21:00

Portugal	0–0 (a.e.t.)	Serbia
	Report
Penalties
Lopes (penalty scored); Silva (penalty scored); Guzzo (penalty scored); Podstawski (penalty missed); Rodrigues (penalty scored)	4–3	(penalty missed) Gaćinović; (penalty scored) Zdjelar; (penalty scored) Ristić; (penalty scored) Jokić; (penalty missed) Milinković-Savić

Pancho Arena, Felcsút
Attendance: 1,181
Referee: István Kovács (Romania)

=== Final ===
31 July 2014
19:00

Portugal	0–1	Germany
	Report	Mukhtar 39'

Ferenc Szusza Stadium, Budapest
Attendance: 8,343
Referee: Xavier Fernández (Spain)

== Goalscorers ==
6 goals

- (Germany) Davie Selke

5 goals

- (Portugal) André Silva

2 goals

- (Austria) Sinan Bytyqi
- (Austria) Florian Grillitsch
- (Germany) Hany Mukhtar
- (Portugal) Marcos Lopes
- (Serbia) Nemanja Maksimović

1 goal

- (Austria) Markus Blutsch
- (Austria) Valentin Grubeck
- (Austria) Peter Michorl
- (Germany) Levin Öztunalı
- (Germany) Niklas Stark
- (Germany) Marc Stendera
- (Germany) Anthony Syhre
- (Hungary) Norbert Balogh
- (Hungary) Zsolt Kalmár
- (Hungary) Bence Mervó
- (Hungary) Szabolcs Varga
- (Israel) Dor Hugi
- (Portugal) Gelson Martins
- (Portugal) Tomás Podstawski
- (Portugal) Romário Baldé
- (Portugal) Ivo Rodrigues
- (Serbia) Luka Jović
- (Serbia) Staniša Mandić
- (Ukraine) Mykyta Burda
- (Ukraine) Vyacheslav Tankovskyi

== Team of the tournament ==
Goalkeepers

- (Portugal) André Moreira
- (Ukraine) Bohdan Sarnavskyi

Defenders

- (Germany) Kevin Akpoguma
- (Serbia) Srđan Babić
- (Portugal) Domingos Duarte
- (Portugal) João Nunes
- (Germany) Niklas Stark
- (Serbia) Vukašin Jovanović

Midfielders

- (Hungary) Zsolt Kalmár
- (Germany) Hany Mukhtar
- (Germany) Levin Öztunali
- (Portugal) Tomás Podstawski
- (Germany) Marc Stendera
- (Bulgaria) Radoslav Tsonev
- (Israel) Michael Ohana

Forwards

- (Portugal) Gelson Martins
- (Austria) Florian Grillitsch
- (Germany) Davie Selke

Source: UEFA Technical Report

Golden player: (Germany) Davie Selke
