= Dean Gal =

Israeli footballer

Dean Gal דין גל
Personal information
- Full name: Dean Gal
- Date of birth: February 13, 1995 (age 31)
- Place of birth: Netanya, Israel
- Position: Goalkeeper

Youth career
- Beitar Tubruk
- 2009–2015: Maccabi Netanya

Senior career*
Years	Team	Apps	(Gls)
2015–2020	Maccabi Netanya	34	(0)
2018	→ Ironi Nesher	4	(0)
2018	→ Hapoel Bik'at HaYarden	3	(0)
2018–2019	→ Hapoel Ashdod	17	(0)
2019–2020	→ Maccabi Sha'arayim	16	(0)
2020–2021	Hapoel Kafr Kanna	7	(0)
2020–2021	→ Hapoel F.C. Sandala Gilboa	11	(0)
2022	Maccabi HaSharon Netanya	1	(0)

International career
2013–2014	Israel U19	14	(0)
- * Club domestic league appearances and goals as of 1 January 2023

Dean Gal (Hebrew: דין גל) is an Israeli footballer who plays for Hapoel Kafr Kanna.

== Honours ==
- Liga Leumit
  - Winner (1): 2016-17
