= Daniel Rosenbichler =

Austrian footballer

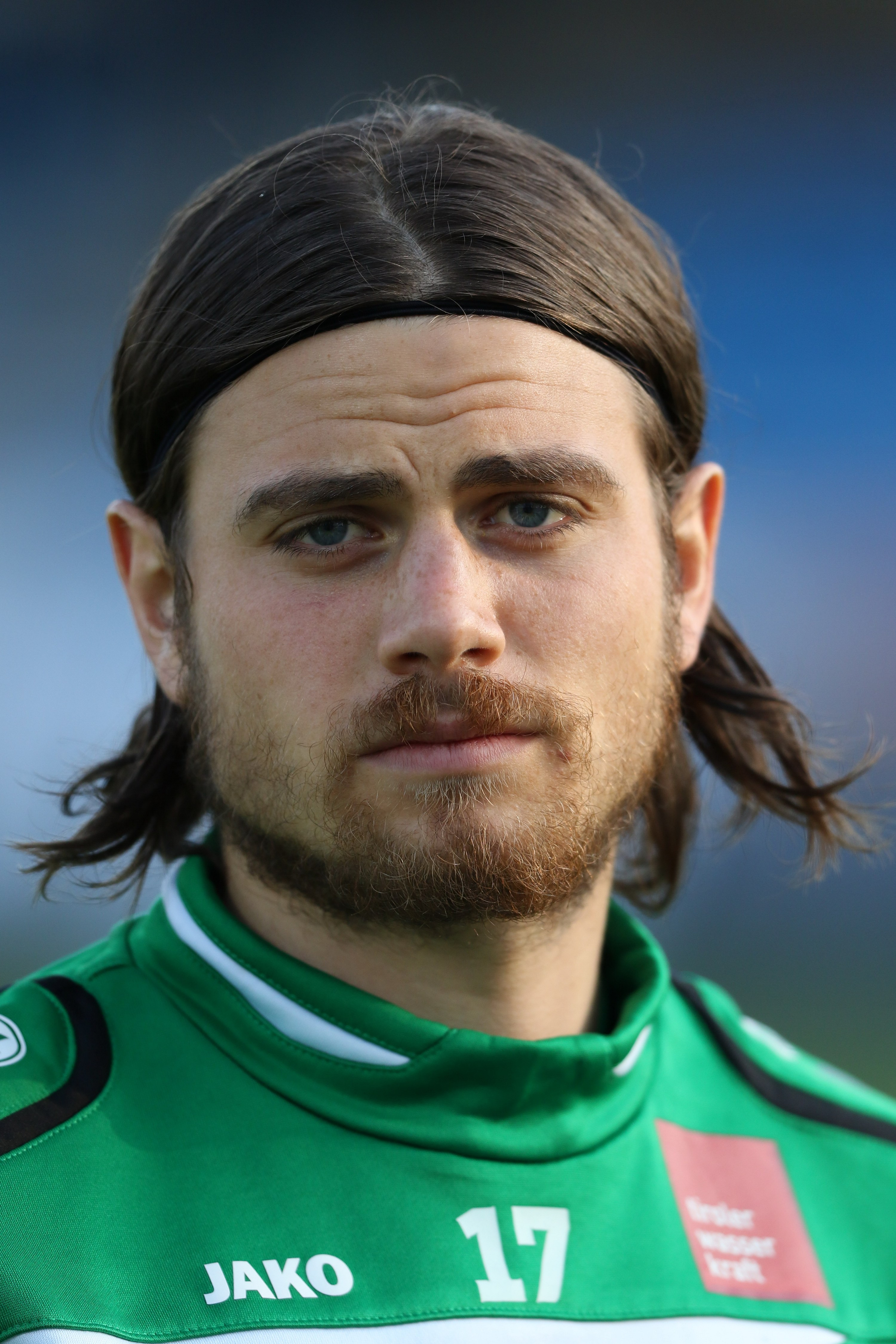

Personal information
- Date of birth: July 10, 1995 (age 31)
- Place of birth: Neunkirchen, Austria
- Height: 1.71 m (5 ft 7 in)
- Position: Right-back

Team information
- Current team: SKU Amstetten
- Number: 11

Youth career
- 2003–2007: USV Kirchberg/Wechsel
- 2007–2009: SVSF Pottschach
- 2008–2009: Admira Wacker

Senior career*
Years	Team	Apps	(Gls)
2012–2017	Admira Wacker II	78	(3)
2015–2016	→ Wacker Innsbruck (loan)	13	(0)
2017–2019	Kapfenberger SV	53	(5)
2019–2020	SV Lafnitz	17	(0)
2021–2022	SV Stripfing	21	(1)
2022–	SKU Amstetten	20	(1)

International career
2010	Austria U16	2	(0)
2011	Austria U17	5	(0)
2012–2013	Austria U18	4	(0)
2013–2014	Austria U19	9	(1)
2013–2014	Austria U20	6	(0)
- * Club domestic league appearances and goals as of 26 May 2024

Daniel Rosenbichler (born 10 July 1995) is an Austrian professional footballer who plays as a right-back for SKU Amstetten.

== Career ==
On 20 June 2019, Rosenbichler joined SV Lafnitz on a 1-year contract.

Rosenbichler joined SKU Amstetten on 1 June 2022.
