= Markus Blutsch =

Austrian footballer

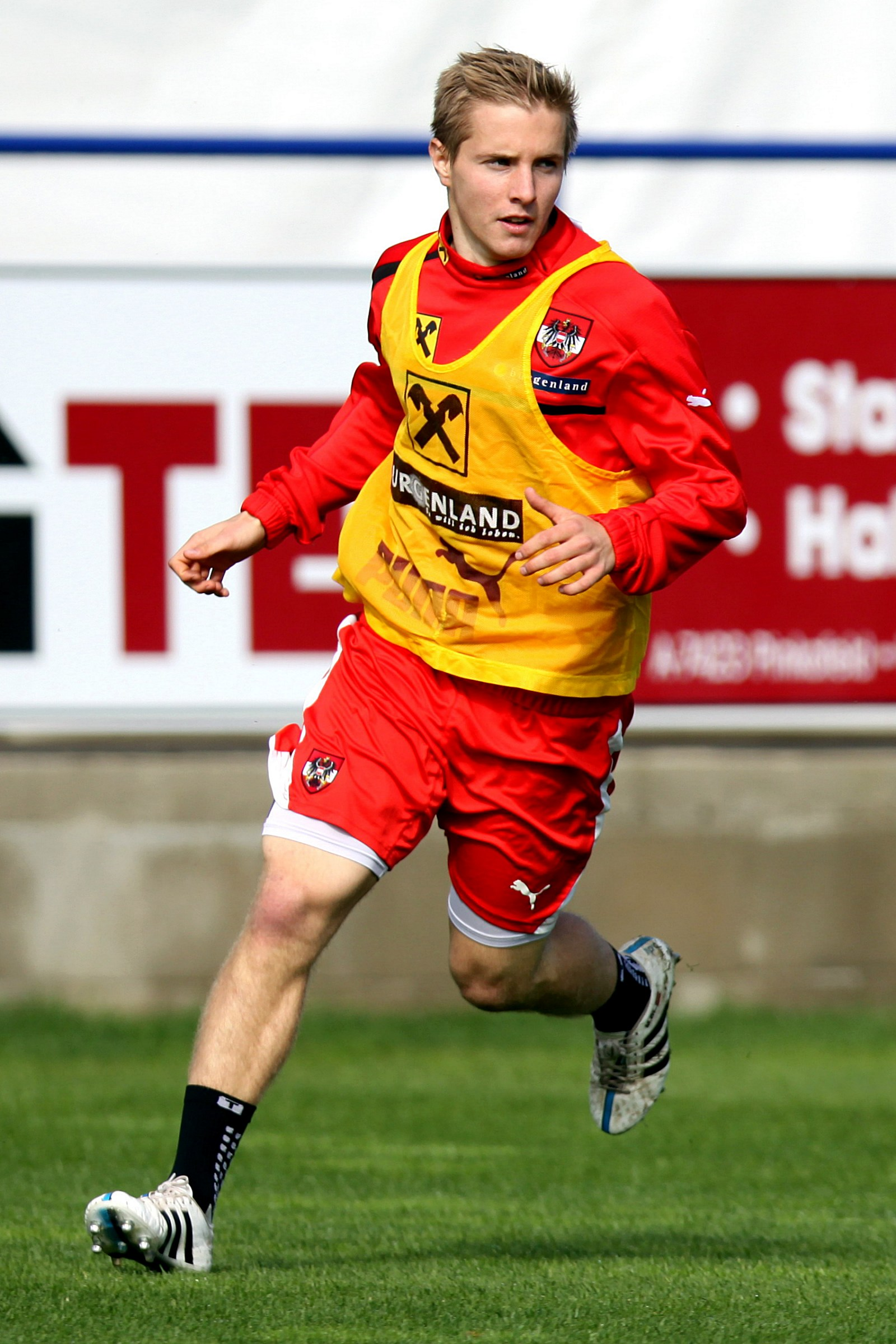

Personal information
- Full name: Markus Blutsch
- Date of birth: 1 June 1995 (age 31)
- Place of birth: Linz, Austria
- Height: 1.68 m (5 ft 6 in)
- Position: Midfielder

Team information
- Current team: SPG Pregarten
- Number: 8

Senior career*
Years	Team	Apps	(Gls)
2011–2013	FC Pasching	41	(4)
2013–2019	LASK Linz	25	(2)
2015–2017	→ Admira Wacker (loan)	32	(1)
2017–2019	→ Blau-Weiß Linz (loan)	50	(4)
2019	ASKÖ Oedt	14	(2)
2020–	SPG Pregarten	13	(4)
- * Club domestic league appearances and goals as of 21:16, 25 October 2020 (UTC)

Markus Blutsch (born 1 June 1995) is an Austrian footballer who plays for SPG Pregarten.

== Honours ==
Pasching

- Austrian Cup: 2012–13
