= Valentin Grubeck =

Austrian footballer

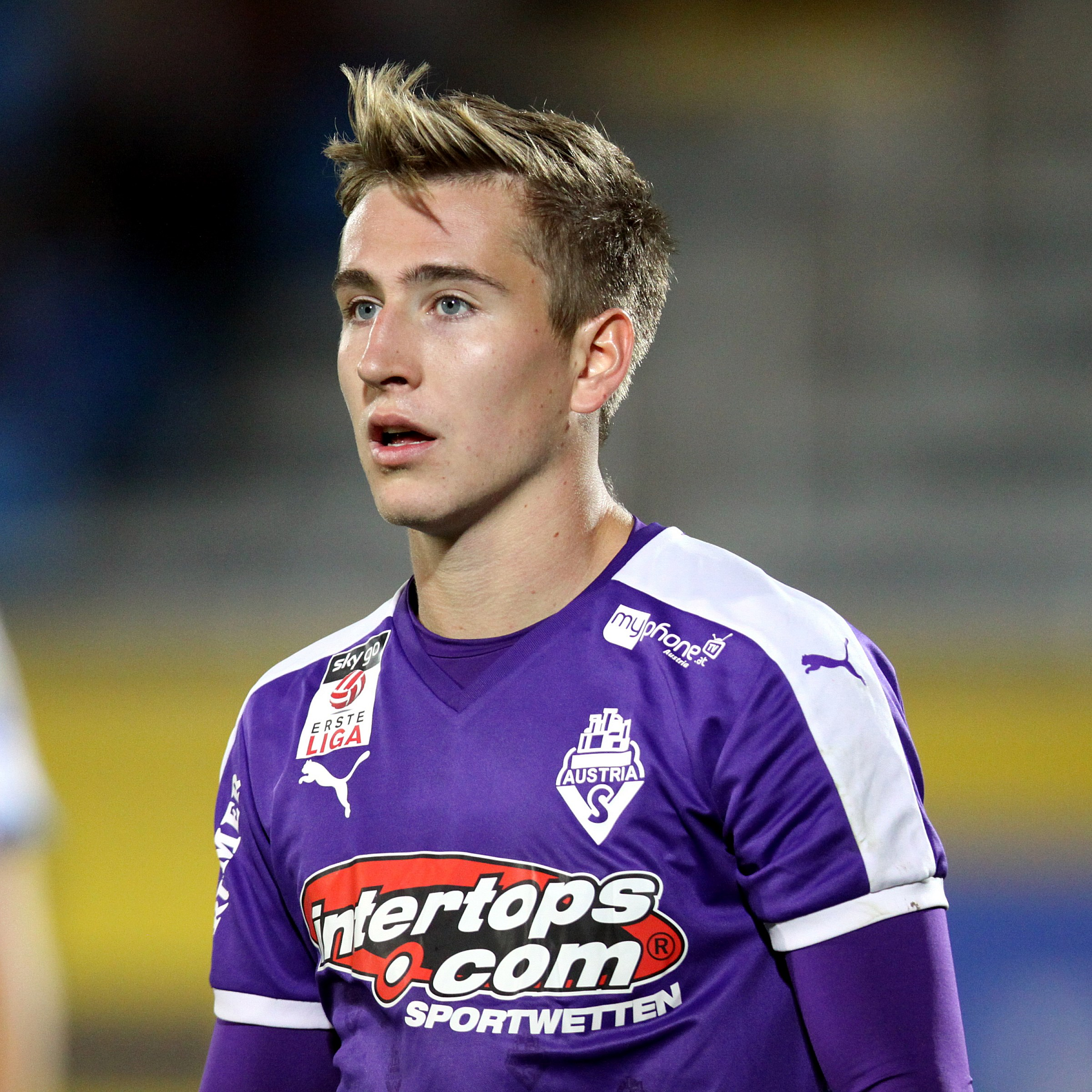

Personal information
- Date of birth: 26 February 1995 (age 31)
- Place of birth: Schärding, Austria
- Height: 1.84 m (6 ft 0 in)
- Position: Forward

Team information
- Current team: Union Weißkirchen

Senior career*
Years	Team	Apps	(Gls)
2012–2015	Austria Wien II	19	(1)
2014–2015	→ SV Horn (loan)	18	(0)
2015–2016	Austria Wien	17	(5)
2016	SV Grödig	7	(1)
2016–2017	Austria Lustenau	32	(0)
2017	LASK Linz	1	(0)
2017–2019	Juniors OÖ	57	(22)
2019–2021	SV Ried	32	(3)
2021	SKU Amstetten	13	(1)
2021–	Union Weißkirchen	1	(0)

International career
2011	Austria U17	5	(2)
2012–2013	Austria U18	5	(0)
2013–2014	Austria U19	10	(2)
2015	Austria U20	6	(2)
- * Club domestic league appearances and goals as of 6 August 2021

Valentin Grubeck (born 26 February 1995) is an Austrian footballer who plays for Austrian side Union Weißkirchen.

== Club career ==
On 20 July 2021, he joined Union Weißkirchen in the fourth-tier OÖ Liga.
