= Michael Ohana =

Israeli footballer (born 1995)

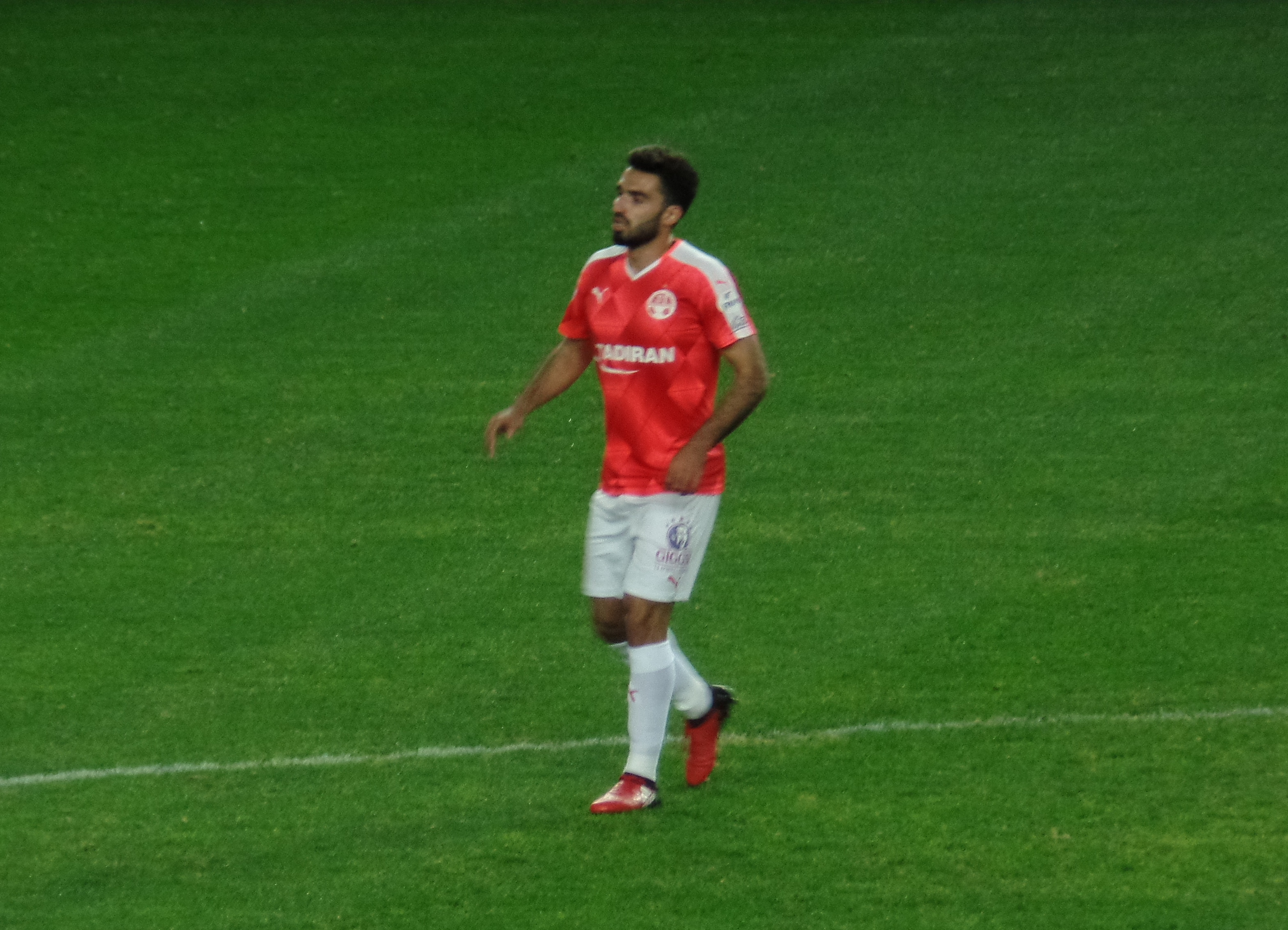

Personal information
- Full name: Michael Ohana
- Date of birth: 4 October 1995 (age 31)
- Place of birth: Jerusalem, Israel
- Height: 1.68 m (5 ft 6 in)
- Position: Attacking midfielder

Team information
- Current team: Maccabi Haifa
- Number: 26

Senior career*
Years	Team	Apps	(Gls)
2012–2016	F.C. Ashdod	77	(3)
2016–2019	Hapoel Be'er Sheva	73	(7)
2019–2022	Beitar Jerusalem	46	(5)
2022–2023	Maccabi Netanya	10	(0)
2023–2024	F.C. Ashdod	25	(2)
2024–2025	Ironi Tiberias	15	(0)
2025–2026	Maccabi Haifa	17	(2)

International career
2010–2011	Israel U17	4	(2)
2013–2014	Israel U19	9	(4)
2015–2017	Israel U21	9	(4)
2017	Israel	1	(0)
- * Club domestic league appearances and goals as of 23 June 2026

Michael Ohana (Hebrew: מיכאל אוחנה; 4 October 1995) is an Israeli professional footballer who last plays as a forward and as an attacking midfielder for Maccabi Haifa.

== Club career ==
Ohana was born in Jerusalem and began playing football at the age of 11 in the local team Hapoel Jerusalem. He also played in the youth teams of Beitar Jerusalem and Maccabi Tel Aviv, before moving to F.C. Ashdod youth team at the age of 16. He attended high school at the Hebrew University Secondary School.

=== FC Ashdod ===
On August 7, 2012, Ohana made his debut in the first team of F.C. Ashdod, when he entered as a substitute in the 4–0 loss to Hapoel Ramat Gan in the Toto Cup. Four months later, in December, Ohana made his debut in Ligat Ha'Al, when he came in as a substitute in the 2–1 loss to Bnei Sakhnin. Until the end of the season, Ohana played 4 more times in the first team. In the following season he played five times in the first team, while continuing to play in the youth team of the club.

In 2014–15 season, Ohana became a key player in the first team of FC Ashdod, under Nir Klinger. Ohana scored two goals this season in 31 games, but his team was relegated to Liga Leumit at the end of the season. One season later, in 2015–16, Ohana again scored two goals, and helped the team to reach a promotion to Ligat Ha'Al, after only one season in Liga Leumit.

=== Hapoel Be'er Sheva ===
On 7 September 2016, the deadline day of the transfer window, Ohana signed a five-year deal with Israeli Premier League champions Hapoel Be'er Sheva, for a reported fee of €1 million. As part of this deal, Be'er Sheva midfielder Dan Bitton was loaned to FC Ashdod for two years. Ohana was not registered to the UEFA Europa League campaign of Hapoel Be'er Sheva, but impressed in Ligat Ha'Al and scored his first goal on 15 October, in the 5–0 win against Maccabi Petah Tikva. Ohana scored an amazing goal with his heel, and some even compared this goal to Dennis Bergkamp against Newcastle in 2002.

=== Beitar Jerusalem ===
On June 20, 2019, Ohana signed a three-year deal with Beitar Jerusalem who paid fifty percent of his ticket for about €2 million.

=== Maccabi Netanya ===
On August 10, 2022, Ohana signed a new contract with Maccabi Netanya.

== International career ==
Ohana played in all youth national teams of Israel, and scored 4 goals in 17 appearances in Israel Under-19, which he led with Eli Ohana as head coach to qualification to the Under-19 European Championship. On 26 March 2015, Ohana made his debut in the Under-21 national team, in an international friendly game against Cyprus. He scored 4 goals in 9 appearances in the Under-21 team.

On 6 November 2016, Ohana was called up for the first time, by Elisha Levy, to the squad of Israel national team, for the 2018 FIFA World Cup qualifiers game against Albania.

== Honours ==
Hapoel Be'er Sheva

- Israeli Premier League: 2016–17, 2017–18
- Toto Cup Top Division: 2016–17
- Israel Super Cup: 2017

Beitar Jerusalem

- Israeli Toto Cup: 2019–20

Individual

- 2014 UEFA Euro U19: Team of the Tournament
