= Sinan Bytyqi =

Kosovo Albanian footballer who played for Austria

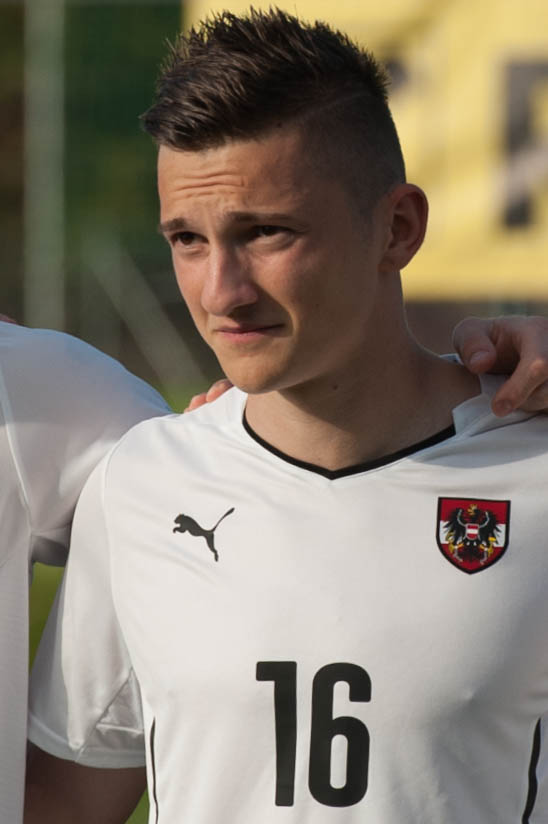
- Bytyqi with Austria U21 in November 2014

Personal information
- Full name: Sinan Bytyqi
- Date of birth: 15 January 1995 (age 31)
- Place of birth: Prizren, FR Yugoslavia
- Height: 1.85 m (6 ft 1 in)
- Position: Midfielder

Team information
- Current team: Blau-Weiß Linz (Assistant)

Youth career
- –2007: Kärnten
- 2007–2009: Austria Kärnten
- 2009–2012: Admira Wacker
- 2012–2017: Manchester City

Senior career*
Years	Team	Apps	(Gls)
2011–2012	Admira Wacker II	2	(0)
2014–2017	Manchester City	0	(0)
2015	→ Cambuur (loan)	9	(0)
2016	→ Go Ahead Eagles (loan)	5	(0)
2023–2024	TSV Grafenstein	2	(0)
Total		18	(0)

International career
2011–2012	Austria U17	3	(0)
2012–2013	Austria U18	3	(2)
2013–2014	Austria U19	10	(7)
2014–2016	Austria U21	3	(1)

Managerial career
- 2017–2021: Manchester City (scout)
- 2021–2022: Weiz II
- 2022: Weiz
- 2023–2024: TSV Grafenstein (player-manager)
- 2024: Sint-Truidense (assistant)
- 2024–2025: Shenzhen Peng City (Assistant)
- 2025–2026: Floridsdorfer AC
- 2026-: FC Blau-Weiß Linz (Assistant)
- * Club domestic league appearances and goals

Sinan Bytyqi (born 15 January 1995) is a Kosovan football manager and former player who is the assistant manager of Austrian 2. Liga club FC Blau-Weiß Linz.

== Club career ==
=== Admira ===
His first inclusion in Admira Wacker II's matchday squad was as an unused substitute against Wiener SK in week 16 of the 2011–12 season in the Austrian Regional League East on 2 March 2012. The following week he made his debut in the starting XI playing the first 55 minutes before being replaced by Daniel Maurer in a 1–0 home win against SV Schwechat. In the third consecutive game, Bytyqi played again and as a starter on 16 March 2012 against Neusiedl am See 1919, which finished in a 4–1 loss, where he was substituted off in the 75th minute for David Peham.

=== Manchester City ===
On 24 September 2014, Bytyqi was included in the teamsheet in a 2014–15 League Cup match against Sheffield Wednesday, which finished in a 7–0 victory. Bytyqi was an unused substitute and held the shirt number 75.

After fellow Kosovan player Bersant Celina was provided a professional contract with Manchester City, on 9 January 2015 Bytyqi also signed a professional contract and was subsequently loaned to Dutch side Cambuur, whom finished the 2014–15 Eredivisie in seventh place, which ensured participation in the UEFA Europa League. Unfortunately, Sinan's time in the Eredivisie was cut short when he sustained an injury in a game against Heracles Almelo in the spring. He made his long-awaited comeback for the EDS against Southampton F.C. in December 2015, helping the team finish out a strong season.

==== Loan at Cambuur ====
On 17 January 2015. Bytyqi made it his debut in professional level with Cambuur in a 2–2 away draw against ADO Den Haag, coming on as a substitute for Daniël de Ridder in the 64th minute. On 28 February 2015, he suffered a season ending knee injury in a match against Heracles Almelo which sidelined him for approximately six months.

==== Loan at Go Ahead Eagles ====
He was again loaned to a Dutch club in summer 2016, joining Go Ahead Eagles. He injured his ankle after only a few games and did not return after he was diagnosed with heart problems in December 2016.

=== Retirement ===
Following a diagnosis of hypertrophic cardiomyopathy, Bytyqi made the decision to retire from professional football, and took up a position as a scout for Manchester City.

== Coaching career ==
In July 2025, Bytyqi was appointed as the head coach of 2. Liga club Floridsdorfer AC.

== International career ==
From 2011, until 2016, Bytyqi has been part of Austria at youth international level, respectively has been part of the U17, U18, U19 and U21 teams and he with these teams played nineteen matches and scored ten goals. On 2 October 2016, he received a call-up from Kosovo for a 2018 FIFA World Cup qualification matches against Croatia and Ukraine. Bytyqi was an unused substitute in both matches.
