= 2015 UEFA European Under-19 Championship qualification =

Tournament details
- Dates: 7 October – 18 November 2014 (qualifying round); 26 March – 3 June 2015 (elite round)
- Teams: 53 (from 1 confederation)

Tournament statistics
- Matches played: 120
- Goals scored: 416 (3.47 per match)
- Top scorer: (Russia) Ramil Sheydayev (10 goals)

The 2015 UEFA European Under-19 Championship qualifying competition was a men's under-19 football competition played in 2014 and 2015 to determine the seven teams joining Greece, who qualified automatically as hosts, in the 2015 UEFA European Under-19 Championship final tournament. A total of 53 UEFA member national teams entered the qualifying competition.

== Format ==
The qualifying competition consisted of two rounds:

- Qualifying round: Apart from Spain, which received a bye to the elite round as the team with the highest seeding coefficient, the remaining 52 teams were drawn into 13 groups of four teams. Each group was played in single round-robin format at one of the teams selected as hosts after the draw. The 13 group winners, the 13 runners-up, and the third-placed team with the best record against the first and second-placed teams in their group advanced to the elite round.
- Elite round: The 28 teams were drawn into seven groups of four teams. Each group was played in single round-robin format at one of the teams selected as hosts after the draw. The seven group winners qualified for the final tournament.

=== Tiebreakers ===
If two or more teams were equal on points on completion of a mini-tournament, the following tie-breaking criteria were applied, in the order given, to determine the rankings:

1. Higher number of points obtained in the mini-tournament matches played among the teams in question;
2. Superior goal difference resulting from the mini-tournament matches played among the teams in question;
3. Higher number of goals scored in the mini-tournament matches played among the teams in question;
4. If, after having applied criteria 1 to 3, teams still had an equal ranking, criteria 1 to 3 were reapplied exclusively to the mini-tournament matches between the teams in question to determine their final rankings. If this procedure did not lead to a decision, criteria 5 to 9 applied;
5. Superior goal difference in all mini-tournament matches;
6. Higher number of goals scored in all mini-tournament matches;
7. If only two teams had the same number of points, and they were tied according to criteria 1 to 6 after having met in the last round of the mini-tournament, their rankings were determined by a penalty shoot-out (not used if more than two teams had the same number of points, or if their rankings were not relevant for qualification for the next stage).
8. Lower disciplinary points total based only on yellow and red cards received in the mini-tournament matches (red card = 3 points, yellow card = 1 point, expulsion for two yellow cards in one match = 3 points);
9. Drawing of lots.

To determine the best third-placed team from the qualifying round, the results against the teams in fourth place were discarded. The following criteria were applied:

1. Higher number of points;
2. Superior goal difference;
3. Higher number of goals scored;
4. Lower disciplinary points total based only on yellow and red cards received (red card = 3 points, yellow card = 1 point, expulsion for two yellow cards in one match = 3 points);
5. Drawing of lots.

== Qualifying round ==
=== Draw ===
The draw for the qualifying round was held at UEFA headquarters in Nyon, Switzerland on 28 November 2013 at 10:15 CET (UTC+1).

The teams were seeded according to their coefficient ranking, calculated based on the following:

- 2011 UEFA European Under-19 Championship final tournament and qualifying competition (qualifying round and elite round)
- 2012 UEFA European Under-19 Championship final tournament and qualifying competition (qualifying round and elite round)
- 2013 UEFA European Under-19 Championship final tournament and qualifying competition (qualifying round and elite round)

Each group contained two teams from Pot A and two teams from Pot B.

For political reasons, if Azerbaijan and Armenia (due to the disputed status of Nagorno-Karabakh), as well as Georgia and Russia (due to the disputed status of South Ossetia), were drawn in the same group, neither would host the mini-tournament.

Bye to elite round
Team	Coeff	Rank
Spain	14.833	1

Pot A
Team	Coeff	Rank
France	12.333	2
Serbia	10.833	3
Turkey	10.500	4
Portugal	9.833	5
England	9.833	6
Netherlands	8.500	7
Denmark	7.667	8
Croatia	7.500	9
Germany	7.333	10
Belgium	7.333	11
Republic of Ireland	7.167	12
Italy	7.000	13
Norway	6.833	14
Czech Republic	6.833	15
Ukraine	6.667	16
Georgia	6.500	17
Austria	6.333	18
Switzerland	5.833	19
Slovakia	5.500	20
Romania	5.167	21
Scotland	5.167	22
Hungary	5.000	23
Poland	4.333	24
Russia	4.167	25
Bosnia and Herzegovina	4.167	26
Israel	4.000	27

Pot B
Team	Coeff	Rank
Slovenia	3.833	28
Northern Ireland	3.667	29
Belarus	3.500	30
Cyprus	3.333	31
Montenegro	3.333	32
Wales	3.333	33
Bulgaria	3.167	34
Macedonia	3.167	35
Iceland	3.000	36
Finland	3.000	37
Estonia	2.667	38
Armenia	2.667	39
Albania	2.667	40
Azerbaijan	2.667	41
Sweden	2.333	42
Latvia	2.000	43
Lithuania	1.667	44
Moldova	1.500	45
Faroe Islands	1.333	46
Malta	1.000	47
Kazakhstan	0.333	48
Luxembourg	0.000	49
San Marino	0.000	50
Andorra	0.000	51
Liechtenstein	0.000	52
Gibraltar	0.000	53

Notes

- Greece (Coeff: 8.667) qualified automatically for the final tournament as hosts.

=== Groups ===
Times up to 25 October 2014 were CEST (UTC+2), thereafter times were CET (UTC+1).

==== Group 1 ====
Pos	Team	Pld	W	D	L	GF	GA	GD	Pts	Qualification
1	England	3	3	0	0	15	2	+13	9	Elite round
2	Belgium	3	2	0	1	9	6	+3	6	Elite round
3	Belarus	3	0	1	2	4	8	−4	1	
4	Luxembourg (H)	3	0	1	2	2	14	−12	1	

Source: UEFA
Rules for classification: Qualification tiebreakers
(H) Hosts
10 October 2014
16:30

England	3–0	Belarus
Loftus-Cheek 30'; Roberts 53'; Fewster 66' (pen.)	Report

Op Flohr Stadion, Grevenmacher
Referee: Kristo Tohver (Estonia)
10 October 2014
19:00

Belgium	4–0	Luxembourg
Oulare 40'; Schrijvers 45+1', 58' (pen.); Kawaya 83'	Report

Stade Municipal, Differdange
Referee: Michael Tykgaard (Denmark)

12 October 2014
15:00

Luxembourg	0–8	England
	Report	Loftus-Cheek 7', 50'; Colkett 13'; Barker 21' (pen.), 44'; Roberts 24' (pen.), 90+3'; Fewster 88'

Stade rue Henri Dunant, Beggen
Referee: Michael Tykgaard (Denmark)
12 October 2014
16:30

Belgium	3–2	Belarus
Kawaya 77'; Cools 88'; Vandeputte 90+3' (pen.)	Report	Yarotsky 17'; Klimovich 26'

Stade Municipal, Differdange
Referee: Ivaylo Stoyanov (Bulgaria)

15 October 2014
19:00

England	4–2	Belgium
Roberts 9'; Fewster 31', 85'; Barker 81'	Report	Cools 16'; Oulare 65'

Stade rue Henri Dunant, Beggen
Referee: Kristo Tohver (Estonia)
15 October 2014
19:00

Belarus	2–2	Luxembourg
Klimovich 63'; Yarotsky 86'	Report	Da Silva 49'; Ewert 90+4'

Op Flohr Stadion, Grevenmacher
Referee: Ivaylo Stoyanov (Bulgaria)

==== Group 2 ====
Pos	Team	Pld	W	D	L	GF	GA	GD	Pts	Qualification
1	Austria	3	3	0	0	7	1	+6	9	Elite round
2	Germany	3	2	0	1	10	5	+5	6	Elite round
3	Latvia (H)	3	1	0	2	3	4	−1	3	
4	Kazakhstan	3	0	0	3	0	10	−10	0	

Source: UEFA
Rules for classification: Qualification tiebreakers
(H) Hosts
9 October 2014
12:00

Germany	6–0	Kazakhstan
Pflücke 6'; Werner 59', 61' (pen.), 90+3'; Tah 88'; Cueto 89'	Report

Olympic Sports Center of Zemgale, Jelgava
Attendance: 30
Referee: Pavle Radovanović (Montenegro)
9 October 2014
15:00

Austria	1–0	Latvia
Kvasina 90+3'	Report

Slokas Stadium, Jūrmala
Attendance: 200
Referee: Alejandro Hernández Hernandez (Spain)

11 October 2014
12:00

Austria	1–0	Kazakhstan
Horvath 49'	Report

Olympic Sports Center of Zemgale, Jelgava
Attendance: 45
Referee: Dennis Antamo (Finland)
11 October 2014
15:00

Latvia	0–3	Germany
	Report	Cueto 19'; Sané 32'; Werner 74'

Slokas Stadium, Jūrmala
Attendance: 250
Referee: Pavle Radovanović (Montenegro)

14 October 2014
15:00

Germany	1–5	Austria
Parker 62'	Report	Kvasina 10', 32'; Ripić 29', 49'; Horvath 74'

Olympic Sports Center of Zemgale, Jelgava
Attendance: 50
Referee: Alejandro Hernández Hernández (Spain)
14 October 2014
15:00

Kazakhstan	0–3	Latvia
	Report	Dobrecovs 28'; Dubrovskis 90+1'; Černomordijs 90+3'

Slokas Stadium, Jūrmala
Attendance: 100
Referee: Dennis Antamo (Finland)

==== Group 3 ====
Pos	Team	Pld	W	D	L	GF	GA	GD	Pts	Qualification
1	Croatia (H)	3	2	1	0	5	1	+4	7	Elite round
2	Turkey	3	1	2	0	7	3	+4	5	Elite round
3	Estonia	3	1	1	1	3	1	+2	4	
4	Iceland	3	0	0	3	4	14	−10	0	

Source: UEFA
Rules for classification: Qualification tiebreakers
(H) Hosts
7 October 2014
14:00

Turkey	7–3	Iceland
Ünal 27', 32', 48', 68'; Öztürk 42'; Okutan 81'; Çağlayan 90+2'	Report	Al. Guðmundsson 17'; Friðjónsson 39'; Sigurðarson 90'

Stadion Hrvatski vitezovi, Dugopolje
Referee: Benoît Millot (France)
7 October 2014
16:00

Croatia	1–0	Estonia
Roguljić 24'	Report

Gradski stadion, Sinj
Referee: Paweł Raczkowski (Poland)

9 October 2014
14:00

Turkey	0–0	Estonia
	Report

Gradski stadion, Sinj
Referee: Vitali Meshkov (Russia)
9 October 2014
16:00

Iceland	1–4	Croatia
Róbertsson 62'	Report	Ćaleta-Car 49'; Šunjić 51'; Benković 82'; Džalto 84'

Stadion Hrvatski vitezovi, Dugopolje
Referee: Paweł Raczkowski (Poland)

12 October 2014
16:00

Croatia	0–0	Turkey
	Report

Stadion Šubićevac, Šibenik
Referee: Benoît Millot (France)
12 October 2014
16:00

Estonia	3–0	Iceland
Liivak 12'; Riiberg 50'; Sappinen 70'	Report

Stadion Hrvatski vitezovi, Dugopolje
Referee: Vitali Meshkov (Russia)

==== Group 4 ====
Pos	Team	Pld	W	D	L	GF	GA	GD	Pts	Qualification
1	Slovakia	3	3	0	0	9	2	+7	9	Elite round
2	Azerbaijan	3	1	1	1	5	7	−2	4	Elite round
3	Hungary (H)	3	0	2	1	2	5	−3	2	
4	Slovenia	3	0	1	2	4	6	−2	1	

Source: UEFA
Rules for classification: Qualification tiebreakers
(H) Hosts
10 November 2014
13:00

Slovakia	2–1	Slovenia
Vestenický 41', 65' (pen.)	Report	Ožbolt 58'

Stadion Gyula Grosics, Tatabánya
Attendance: 100
Referee: Marco Guida (Italy)
10 November 2014
18:00

Hungary	1–1	Azerbaijan
Polgár 37'	Report	Nasirov 84'

Stadion Eszperantó Út, Dunaújváros
Attendance: 250
Referee: John Beaton (Scotland)

12 November 2014
13:00

Slovakia	4–1	Azerbaijan
Lesniak 41'; Hromada 52' (pen.); Vestenický 68'; Káčer 86'	Report	Nasirov 50' (pen.)

Stadion Eszperantó Út, Dunaújváros
Attendance: 100
Referee: Eli Hacmon (Israel)
12 November 2014
13:00

Slovenia	1–1	Hungary
Ožbolt 45+1'	Report	Rácz 64' (pen.)

Grosics Gyula Stadion, Tatabánya
Attendance: 457
Referee: John Beaton (Scotland)

15 November 2014
13:00

Hungary	0–3	Slovakia
	Report	Polievka 48'; Bénes 66'; Špalek 72'

Stadion Eszperantó Út, Dunaújváros
Attendance: 200
Referee: Marco Guida (Italy)
15 November 2014
13:00

Azerbaijan	3–2	Slovenia
Agaragimov 23' (pen.); Suleymanov 35'; Madatov 42'	Report	Ožbolt 48', 77' (pen.)

Grosics Gyula Stadion, Tatabánya
Attendance: 40
Referee: Eli Hacmon (Israel)

==== Group 5 ====
Pos	Team	Pld	W	D	L	GF	GA	GD	Pts	Qualification
1	Russia	3	3	0	0	15	2	+13	9	Elite round
2	Czech Republic	3	2	0	1	4	3	+1	6	Elite round
3	Northern Ireland (H)	3	1	0	2	5	7	−2	3	
4	Faroe Islands	3	0	0	3	0	12	−12	0	

Source: UEFA
Rules for classification: Qualification tiebreakers
(H) Hosts
9 October 2014
15:00

Czech Republic	2–0	Northern Ireland
Černý 20'; Batka 44'	Report

Stangmore Park, Dungannon
Referee: Serdar Gözübüyük (Netherlands)
9 October 2014
20:00

Russia	7–0	Faroe Islands
S. Makarov 9'; Sheydayev 29', 85'; Chernov 30'; Guliev 33'; Golovin 38'; Zuyev 88'	Report

Shamrock Park, Portadown
Referee: Dimitar Meckarovski (Macedonia)

11 October 2014
15:00

Russia	5–2	Northern Ireland
Sheydayev 31' (pen.), 38'; Guliyev 52'; Bezdenezhnykh 60'; Maksimenko 72'	Report	Thompson 66' (pen.); Tracey 90'

Stangmore Park, Dungannon
Referee: Chris Reisch (Luxembourg)
11 October 2014
15:00

Faroe Islands	0–2	Czech Republic
	Report	Januška 16'; Buchvaldek 50'

Shamrock Park, Portadown
Referee: Dimitar Meckarovski (Macedonia)

14 October 2014
15:00

Czech Republic	0–3	Russia
	Report	Sheydayev 33', 84'; Zhemaletdinov 64'

Shamrock Park, Portadown
Referee: Serdar Gözübüyük (Netherlands)
14 October 2014
15:00

Northern Ireland	3–0	Faroe Islands
Newberry 22'; Ives 82'; McDonagh 90+2' (pen.)	Report

The Oval, Belfast
Referee: Chris Reisch (Luxembourg)

==== Group 6 ====
Pos	Team	Pld	W	D	L	GF	GA	GD	Pts	Qualification
1	Switzerland	3	2	1	0	16	2	+14	7	Elite round
2	Republic of Ireland (H)	3	2	1	0	6	2	+4	7	Elite round
3	Malta	3	1	0	2	4	9	−5	3	
4	Gibraltar	3	0	0	3	2	15	−13	0	

Source: UEFA
Rules for classification: Qualification tiebreakers
(H) Hosts
13 November 2014
16:00

Switzerland	8–0	Gibraltar
Dominguez 32'; Oberlin 39', 45', 56'; Turkeš 41', 45+3'; Zakaria 58'; Oliveira 65'	Report

Ferrycarrig Park, Wexford
Referee: Sergey Tsinkevich (Belarus)
13 November 2014
20:45

Republic of Ireland	1–0	Malta
Stokes 17'	Report

Regional Sports Centre, Waterford
Referee: Radu Petrescu (Romania)

15 November 2014
16:00

Republic of Ireland	4–1	Gibraltar
Grego-Cox 3'; Stokes 32', 68'; Jolley 43' (o.g.)	Report	Consigliero 37'

Ferrycarrig Park, Wexford
Referee: Fran Jović (Croatia)
15 November 2014
16:00

Malta	1–7	Switzerland
Guillaumier 8'	Report	Hunziker 27', 33', 63', 76', 77'; Pagliuca 58'; Elvedi 71'

Regional Sports Centre, Waterford
Referee: Radu Petrescu (Romania)

18 November 2014
15:00

Switzerland	1–1	Republic of Ireland
Turkeš 2'	Report	Grego-Cox 48'

Regional Sports Centre, Waterford
Referee: Sergey Tsinkevich (Belarus)
18 November 2014
15:00

Gibraltar	1–3	Malta
J. Coombes 52' (pen.)	Report	Friggieri 43'; Degabriele 59'; Guillaumier 86'

Graun Park, Tramore
Referee: Fran Jović (Croatia)

==== Group 7 ====
Pos	Team	Pld	W	D	L	GF	GA	GD	Pts	Qualification
1	Portugal (H)	3	3	0	0	8	3	+5	9	Elite round
2	Denmark	3	2	0	1	6	2	+4	6	Elite round
3	Wales	3	1	0	2	3	7	−4	3	
4	Albania	3	0	0	3	2	7	−5	0	

Source: UEFA
Rules for classification: Qualification tiebreakers
(H) Hosts
12 November 2014
12:00

Denmark	1–0	Albania
Corlu 57'	Report

Estádio Fernando Cabrita, Lagos
Referee: Bastian Dankert (Germany)
12 November 2014
16:00

Portugal	2–1	Wales
Pereira 29'; Dias 76'	Report	Wilson 62'

Estádio da Nora, Ferreiras
Referee: Sergey Lapochkin (Russia)

14 November 2014
12:00

Denmark	4–0	Wales
Hansen 16'; Gartenmann 27'; Pohl 29'; Ingvartsen 76' (pen.)	Report

Albufeira Municipal Stadium, Albufeira
Referee: Roi Reinshreiber (Israel)
14 November 2014
16:00

Albania	1–4	Portugal
Morina 62'	Report	Paulo Henrique 5'; Sanches 10'; Pereira 15'; Guedes 42'

Municipal Stadium Bela Vista, Parchal
Referee: Sergey Lapochkin (Russia)

17 November 2014
16:00

Portugal	2–1	Denmark
Guedes 45'; Jota 69'	Report	Corlu 53'

Estádio da Nora, Ferreiras
Referee: Bastian Dankert (Germany)
17 November 2014
16:00

Wales	2–1	Albania
G. Thomas 24'; J. Thomas 60'	Report	Morina 74'

Municipal Stadium Bela Vista, Parchal
Referee: Roi Reinshreiber (Israel)

==== Group 8 ====
Pos	Team	Pld	W	D	L	GF	GA	GD	Pts	Qualification
1	Ukraine	3	2	1	0	12	3	+9	7	Elite round
2	Sweden	3	2	1	0	8	3	+5	7	Elite round
3	Israel (H)	3	1	0	2	2	7	−5	3	
4	Bulgaria	3	0	0	3	3	12	−9	0	

Source: UEFA
Rules for classification: Qualification tiebreakers
(H) Hosts
12 November 2014
16:00

Ukraine	2–2	Sweden
Boryachuk 62'; Zubkov 67'	Report	Berisha 30' (pen.); Ssewankambo 31'

National Team Complex, Shefayim
Referee: Anthony Taylor (England)
12 November 2014
16:00

Israel	2–1	Bulgaria
Inebrum 36'; Hozez 80'	Report	Lyubomirov 30'

Netanya Stadium, Netanya
Referee: Ján Valášek (Slovakia)

14 November 2014
12:00

Sweden	1–0	Israel
Nordin 90+3'	Report

Netanya Stadium, Netanya
Referee: Ján Valášek (Slovakia)
14 November 2014
14:00

Ukraine	5–1	Bulgaria
Luchkevych 42'; Kovalenko 46', 75'; Zubkov 77'; Boryachuk 87'	Report	Despodov 36'

National Team Complex, Shefayim
Referee: Mete Kalkavan (Turkey)

17 November 2014
16:00

Israel	0–5	Ukraine
	Report	Besyedin 18'; Arendaruk 27'; Kovalenko 58'; Boryachuk 66'; Zubkov 82'

Netanya Stadium, Netanya
Referee: Anthony Taylor (England)
17 November 2014
16:00

Bulgaria	1–5	Sweden
Despodov 67'	Report	J. Andersson 26'; Strandberg 61', 79'; Suljic 76'; Rakip 90'

National Team Complex, Shefayim
Referee: Mete Kalkavan (Turkey)

==== Group 9 ====
Pos	Team	Pld	W	D	L	GF	GA	GD	Pts	Qualification
1	Italy	3	3	0	0	12	1	+11	9	Elite round
2	Serbia (H)	3	2	0	1	6	3	+3	6	Elite round
3	Armenia	3	1	0	2	2	4	−2	3	
4	San Marino	3	0	0	3	0	12	−12	0	

Source: UEFA
Rules for classification: Qualification tiebreakers
(H) Hosts
10 October 2014
14:30

Italy	3–0	Armenia
Cerri 66'; Verde 80'; Bonazzoli 88'	Report

Karađorđe Stadium, Novi Sad
Referee: Hugo Miguel (Portugal)
10 October 2014
14:30

Serbia	4–0	San Marino
Pantić 6' (pen.), 20'; Jović 41'; Grujić 78'	Report

Sports Center of FA of Serbia, Stara Pazova
Referee: Petur Reinert (Faroe Islands)

12 October 2014
14:30

Italy	6–0	San Marino
Panico 17'; Bonazzoli 38', 75', 90+1'; Di Molfetta 45+1'; Calabresi 82'	Report

Karađorđe Stadium, Novi Sad
Referee: Petur Reinert (Faroe Islands)
12 October 2014
14:30

Armenia	0–1	Serbia
	Report	Radonjić 45+1'

Sports Center of FA of Serbia, Stara Pazova
Referee: Alan Mario Sant (Malta)

15 October 2014
14:30

Serbia	1–3	Italy
Babić 39'	Report	Cerri 9'; Panico 16'; Parigini 75'

Karađorđe Stadium, Novi Sad
Referee: Hugo Miguel (Portugal)
15 October 2014
14:30

San Marino	0–2	Armenia
	Report	Ra. Hakobyan 12'; Voskanyan 87'

Sports Center of FA of Serbia, Stara Pazova
Referee: Alan Mario Sant (Malta)

==== Group 10 ====
Pos	Team	Pld	W	D	L	GF	GA	GD	Pts	Qualification
1	Netherlands	3	3	0	0	12	1	+11	9	Elite round
2	Poland (H)	3	2	0	1	8	3	+5	6	Elite round
3	Moldova	3	1	0	2	3	8	−5	3	
4	Andorra	3	0	0	3	1	12	−11	0	

Source: UEFA
Rules for classification: Qualification tiebreakers
(H) Hosts
9 October 2014
15:30

Netherlands	7–0	Andorra
Nouri 32', 73'; Van de Beek 49', 87'; Ould-Chikh 51'; Zivkovic 54'; Van Bruggen 89' (pen.)	Report

GKS Olimpia Grudziadz, Grudziądz
Referee: Sergejus Slyva (Lithuania)
9 October 2014
15:30

Poland	4–1	Moldova
Zawada 6'; Kapustka 41'; Popovici 49' (o.g.); Tomasiewicz 81' (pen.)	Report	Bejan 86'

CSiRT Tuchola stadium, Tuchola
Referee: Ognjen Valjić (Bosnia and Herzegovina)

11 October 2014
11:00

Netherlands	3–0	Moldova
Van Bruggen 66'; Nieuwkoop 78'; Van Amersfoort 80'	Report

Olympic Municipal Stadium, Inowrocław
Referee: Vlado Glođović (Serbia)
11 October 2014
15:00

Andorra	0–3	Poland
	Report	Tomasiewicz 11' (pen.); Buksa 30', 44'

Olympic Municipal Stadium, Inowrocław
Referee: Sergejus Slyva (Lithuania)

14 October 2014
15:30

Poland	1–2	Netherlands
Dankowski 39'	Report	Nouri 44'; Kallon 75'

GKS Olimpia Grudziadz, Grudziądz
Referee: Vlado Glođović (Serbia)
14 October 2014
15:30

Moldova	2–1	Andorra
Cobeț 28'; V. Macrițchii 80' (pen.)	Report	Aa. Sánchez 13'

CSiRT Tuchola stadium, Tuchola
Referee: Ognjen Valjić (Bosnia and Herzegovina)

==== Group 11 ====
Pos	Team	Pld	W	D	L	GF	GA	GD	Pts	Qualification
1	Montenegro	3	3	0	0	9	3	+6	9	Elite round
2	Georgia (H)	3	2	0	1	6	4	+2	6	Elite round
3	Cyprus	3	1	0	2	5	9	−4	3	
4	Romania	3	0	0	3	1	5	−4	0	

Source: UEFA
Rules for classification: Qualification tiebreakers
(H) Hosts
8 October 2014
12:00

Romania	0–1	Cyprus
	Report	Katelaris 90+2'

Mikheil Meskhi Stadium-2, Tbilisi
Referee: Artyom Kuchin (Kazakhstan)
8 October 2014
14:00

Georgia	0–2	Montenegro
	Report	Cmiljanić 64' (pen.); O. Sarkic 81'

Mikheil Meskhi Stadium, Tbilisi
Referee: Petr Ardeleánu (Czech Republic)

10 October 2014
12:00

Romania	0–1	Montenegro
	Report	Vujnović 83'

Mikheil Meskhi Stadium-2, Tbilisi
Referee: Nikolaj Hänni (Switzerland)
10 October 2014
14:00

Cyprus	1–3	Georgia
Katsiati 72'	Report	Kiteishvili 19'; Mokhevishvili Chikviladze 67'; Zarandia 83' (pen.)

Mikheil Meskhi Stadium, Tbilisi
Referee: Petr Ardeleánu (Czech Republic)

13 October 2014
14:00

Georgia	3–1	Romania
Kiteishvili 9', 13'; Malania 48'	Report	Pușcaș 1'

Mikheil Meskhi Stadium, Tbilisi
Referee: Artyom Kuchin (Kazakhstan)
13 October 2014
14:00

Montenegro	6–3	Cyprus
Vujnović 27'; O. Sarkic 39'; Rudović 56', 77'; Cmiljanić 84'; Milošević 90+3'	Report	P. Christodoulou 18'; Charalambous 48'; G. Christodoulou 90+3'

Mikheil Meskhi Stadium-2, Tbilisi
Referee: Nikolaj Hänni (Switzerland)

==== Group 12 ====
Pos	Team	Pld	W	D	L	GF	GA	GD	Pts	Qualification
1	France	3	2	1	0	8	1	+7	7	Elite round
2	Bosnia and Herzegovina	3	1	2	0	6	1	+5	5	Elite round
3	Macedonia (H)	3	1	1	1	7	4	+3	4	
4	Liechtenstein	3	0	0	3	1	16	−15	0	

Source: UEFA
Rules for classification: Qualification tiebreakers
(H) Hosts
8 October 2014
15:00

Bosnia and Herzegovina	5–0	Liechtenstein
Burović 5', 10'; Mihojević 7'; Juričić 19', 55'	Report

Boris Trajkovski Stadium, Skopje
Referee: Lasha Silagava (Georgia)
8 October 2014
15:00

France	2–1	Macedonia
Maupay 19'; Dembélé 41'	Report	Sulejmanov 71' (pen.)

FFM Training Centre, Skopje
Referee: Arnold Hunter (Northern Ireland)

10 October 2014
15:00

Bosnia and Herzegovina	1–1	Macedonia
Radovac 41'	Report	Krezić 33'

FFM Training Centre, Skopje
Referee: Stavros Tritsonis (Greece)
10 October 2014
15:00

Liechtenstein	0–6	France
	Report	N'Nomo 36', 56'; Kemen 38'; Maupay 48'; Dembélé 73'; Göppel 90+2' (o.g.)

Boris Trajkovski Stadium, Skopje
Referee: Lasha Silagava (Georgia)

13 October 2014
15:00

France	0–0	Bosnia and Herzegovina
	Report

Boris Trajkovski Stadium, Skopje
Referee: Stavros Tritsonis (Greece)
13 October 2014
15:00

Macedonia	5–1	Liechtenstein
Kochoski 36'; Babunski 51' (pen.), 52', 82'; Petkovski 90+3'	Report	Hofer 20'

FFM Training Centre, Skopje
Referee: Arnold Hunter (Northern Ireland)

==== Group 13 ====
Pos	Team	Pld	W	D	L	GF	GA	GD	Pts	Qualification
1	Norway	3	1	2	0	3	1	+2	5	Elite round
2	Lithuania (H)	3	1	1	1	3	2	+1	4	Elite round
3	Scotland	3	0	3	0	3	3	0	3	Elite round
4	Finland	3	0	2	1	2	5	−3	2	

Source: UEFA
Rules for classification: Qualification tiebreakers
(H) Hosts
7 October 2014
14:00

Scotland	2–2	Finland
McMullan 33'; Henderson 61' (pen.)	Report	Lassas 76'; Savolainen 90+1'

Dariaus ir Girėno stadionas, Kaunas
Referee: Yuriy Mozharovskyi (Ukraine)
7 October 2014
17:00

Norway	2–0	Lithuania
Sørmo 5'; Espejord 58'	Report

SRC Alytus, Alytus
Referee: Alexander Harkam (Austria)

9 October 2014
14:00

Norway	0–0	Finland
	Report

Dariaus ir Girėno stadionas, Kaunas
Referee: Alexandre Boucaut (Belgium)
9 October 2014
17:00

Lithuania	0–0	Scotland
	Report

SRC Alytus, Alytus
Referee: Yuriy Mozharovskyi (Ukraine)

12 October 2014
14:00

Scotland	1–1	Norway
Muirhead 26'	Report	Thorsby 80'

Dariaus ir Girėno stadionas, Kaunas
Referee: Alexander Harkam (Austria)
12 October 2014
14:00

Finland	0–3	Lithuania
	Report	Šimkus 28'; Šėgžda 45'; Janonis 89'

SRC Alytus, Alytus
Referee: Alexandre Boucaut (Belgium)

=== Ranking of third-placed teams ===
To determine the best third-placed team from the qualifying round which advanced to the elite round, only the results of the third-placed teams against the first and second-placed teams in their group are taken into account.

Pos	Grp	Team	Pld	W	D	L	GF	GA	GD	Pts	Qualification
1	13	Scotland	2	0	2	0	1	1	0	2	Elite round
2	12	Macedonia	2	0	1	1	2	3	−1	1	
3	3	Estonia	2	0	1	1	0	1	−1	1	
4	4	Hungary	2	0	1	1	1	4	−3	1	
5	1	Belarus	2	0	0	2	2	6	−4	0	
6	2	Latvia	2	0	0	2	0	4	−4	0 (Note: Tie broken by disciplinary points.)	
7	9	Armenia	2	0	0	2	0	4	−4	0	
8	11	Cyprus	2	0	0	2	4	9	−5	0	
9	5	Northern Ireland	2	0	0	2	2	7	−5	0	
10	7	Wales	2	0	0	2	1	6	−5	0	
11	10	Moldova	2	0	0	2	1	7	−6	0	
12	8	Israel	2	0	0	2	0	6	−6	0	
13	6	Malta	2	0	0	2	1	8	−7	0	

Source: UEFA
Rules for classification: 1) points; 2) goal difference; 3) number of goals scored; 4) disciplinary points; 5) drawing of lots.

== Elite round ==
=== Draw ===
The draw for the elite round was held at UEFA headquarters in Nyon, Switzerland on 3 December 2014 at 11:20 CET (UTC+1).

The teams were seeded according to their results in the qualifying round. Spain, which received a bye to the elite round, were automatically seeded into Pot A. Each group contained one team from Pot A, one team from Pot B, one team from Pot C, and one team from Pot D. Teams from the same qualifying round group could not be drawn in the same group.

Before the draw UEFA confirmed that, for political reasons, Ukraine and Russia could not be drawn in the same group due to the Russian military intervention in Ukraine.

Pos	Grp	Team	Pld	W	D	L	GF	GA	GD	Pts	Seeding
1	—	Spain	0	0	0	0	0	0	0	0	Pot A
2	1	England	3	3	0	0	15	2	+13	9 (Note: Tie broken by disciplinary points.)	Pot A
3	5	Russia	3	3	0	0	15	2	+13	9	Pot A
4	9	Italy	3	3	0	0	12	1	+11	9	Pot A
5	10	Netherlands	3	3	0	0	12	1	+11	9	Pot A
6	4	Slovakia	3	3	0	0	9	2	+7	9	Pot A
7	11	Montenegro	3	3	0	0	9	3	+6	9	Pot A
8	2	Austria	3	3	0	0	7	1	+6	9	Pot B
9	7	Portugal	3	3	0	0	8	3	+5	9	Pot B
10	6	Switzerland	3	2	1	0	16	2	+14	7	Pot B
11	8	Ukraine	3	2	1	0	12	3	+9	7	Pot B
12	12	France	3	2	1	0	8	1	+7	7	Pot B
13	8	Sweden	3	2	1	0	8	3	+5	7	Pot B
14	6	Republic of Ireland	3	2	1	0	6	2	+4	7	Pot B
15	3	Croatia	3	2	1	0	5	1	+4	7	Pot C
16	2	Germany	3	2	0	1	10	5	+5	6	Pot C
17	10	Poland	3	2	0	1	8	3	+5	6	Pot C
18	7	Denmark	3	2	0	1	6	2	+4	6	Pot C
19	1	Belgium	3	2	0	1	9	6	+3	6	Pot C
20	9	Serbia	3	2	0	1	6	3	+3	6	Pot C
21	11	Georgia	3	2	0	1	6	4	+2	6	Pot C
22	5	Czech Republic	3	2	0	1	4	3	+1	6	Pot D
23	12	Bosnia and Herzegovina	3	1	2	0	6	1	+5	5	Pot D
24	3	Turkey	3	1	2	0	7	3	+4	5	Pot D
25	13	Norway	3	1	2	0	3	1	+2	5	Pot D
26	13	Lithuania	3	1	1	1	3	2	+1	4	Pot D
27	4	Azerbaijan	3	1	1	1	5	7	−2	4	Pot D
28	13	Scotland	3	0	3	0	3	3	0	3	Pot D

Source: UEFA
Rules for classification: 1) points; 2) goal difference; 3) number of goals scored; 4) disciplinary points; 5) coefficient used for qualifying round draw; 6) drawing of lots.

=== Groups ===
Times up to 28 March 2015 were CET (UTC+1), thereafter times were CEST (UTC+2).

==== Group 1 ====
Pos	Team	Pld	W	D	L	GF	GA	GD	Pts	Qualification
1	Spain	3	3	0	0	13	1	+12	9	Final tournament
2	Portugal	3	2	0	1	9	7	+2	6	
3	Georgia (H)	3	1	0	2	5	8	−3	3	
4	Turkey	3	0	0	3	2	13	−11	0	

Source: UEFA
Rules for classification: Qualification tiebreakers
(H) Hosts
29 May 2015
12:00

Portugal	6–1	Turkey
Rodrigues 11' (pen.), 55' (pen.); Pedro Henrique 23'; A. Silva 33'; Jota 61'; F. Silva 82'	Report	Çağlayan 36'

Mikheil Meskhi Stadium-2, Tbilisi
Referee: Daniel Siebert (Germany)
29 May 2015
15:00

Spain	4–1	Georgia
Asensio 14'; Vallejo 27'; Mayoral 79'; Pedraza 90+3'	Report	Tevzadze 45'

Mikheil Meskhi Stadium, Tbilisi
Referee: Radu Petrescu (Romania)

31 May 2015
12:00

Spain	5–0	Turkey
Pedraza 8'; Vallejo 43'; Mayoral 55', 77'; Asensio 73'	Report

Mikheil Meskhi Stadium-2, Tbilisi
Referee: Bartosz Frankowski (Poland)
31 May 2015
15:00

Georgia	2–3	Portugal
Malania 45'; Goshteliani 49'	Report	Rodrigues 4' (pen.); F. Silva 70'; Dias 76'

Mikheil Meskhi Stadium, Tbilisi
Referee: Radu Petrescu (Romania)

3 June 2015
15:00

Portugal	0–4	Spain
	Report	Martín 22'; Mayoral 28'; Asensio 50'; Pedraza 80'

Mikheil Meskhi Stadium-2, Tbilisi
Referee: Daniel Siebert (Germany)
3 June 2015
15:00

Turkey	1–2	Georgia
Ünder 41'	Report	Tevzadze 57'; Goshteliani 87'

Mikheil Meskhi Stadium, Tbilisi
Referee: Bartosz Frankowski (Poland)

==== Group 2 ====
Pos	Team	Pld	W	D	L	GF	GA	GD	Pts	Qualification
1	Germany (H)	3	2	1	0	10	3	+7	7	Final tournament
2	Slovakia	3	1	2	0	6	3	+3	5	
3	Czech Republic	3	1	0	2	1	9	−8	3	
4	Republic of Ireland	3	0	1	2	4	6	−2	1	

Source: UEFA
Rules for classification: Qualification tiebreakers
(H) Hosts
26 March 2015
12:00

Slovakia	1–1	Germany
Vestenický 90+3'	Report	Christiansen 19'

Carl-Benz-Stadion, Mannheim
Referee: Aliyar Aghayev (Azerbaijan)
26 March 2015
17:00

Republic of Ireland	0–1	Czech Republic
	Report	Schick 66'

Carl-Benz-Stadion, Mannheim
Referee: Jens Maae (Denmark)

28 March 2015
12:00

Germany	3–2	Republic of Ireland
Amiri 52'; Cueto 82'; Föhrenbach 90+2'	Report	Hallahan 58'; Coustrain 72'

Hardtwaldstadion, Sandhausen
Referee: Jens Maae (Denmark)
28 March 2015
17:00

Slovakia	3–0	Czech Republic
Kružliak 27'; Čmelík 29'; Vestenický 55' (pen.)	Report

Hardtwaldstadion, Sandhausen
Referee: Jonathan Lardot (Belgium)

31 March 2015
12:00

Republic of Ireland	2–2	Slovakia
Manning 77' (pen.); Coustrain 90+1'	Report	Vavro 12'; Čmelík 44'

Carl-Benz-Stadion, Mannheim
Referee: Aliyar Aghayev (Azerbaijan)
31 March 2015
12:00

Czech Republic	0–6	Germany
	Report	Sané 20', 64'; Rizzo 27'; Christiansen 47'; Cueto 67'; Amiri 86' (pen.)

FC-Astoria Stadion, Walldorf
Referee: Jonathan Lardot (Belgium)

==== Group 3 ====
Pos	Team	Pld	W	D	L	GF	GA	GD	Pts	Qualification
1	Russia	3	3	0	0	10	1	+9	9	Final tournament
2	Belgium	3	1	1	1	4	3	+1	4	
3	Lithuania	3	0	2	1	3	9	−6	2	
4	Sweden (H)	3	0	1	2	2	6	−4	1	

Source: UEFA
Rules for classification: Qualification tiebreakers
(H) Hosts
26 March 2015
18:00

Sweden	1–1	Lithuania
Berisha 15'	Report	Spietinis 61'

Norrköpings Idrottsparken, Norrköping
Referee: Stavros Tritsonis (Greece)
26 March 2015
19:00

Russia	1–0	Belgium
Zhemaletdinov 78'	Report

Kopparvallen, Åtvidaberg
Referee: Tamás Bognar (Hungary)

28 March 2015
14:00

Russia	6–0	Lithuania
Zhemaletdinov 37', 50'; Sheydayev 47', 56'; Bezdenezhnykh 64'; Golovin 69'	Report

Norrköpings Idrottsparken, Norrköping
Referee: Tiago Martins (Portugal)
28 March 2015
14:00

Belgium	2–0	Sweden
J. Andersson 34' (o.g.); Weymans 86'	Report

Kopparvallen, Åtvidaberg
Referee: Stavros Tritsonis (Greece)

31 March 2015
17:00

Sweden	1–3	Russia
Berisha 29'	Report	Gasilin 16'; Sheydayev 22' (pen.), 31'

Norrköpings Idrottsparken, Norrköping
Referee: Tamás Bognar (Hungary)
31 March 2015
17:00

Lithuania	2–2	Belgium
Dombrauskis 30'; Romanovskij 90+2' (pen.)	Report	Rosenthal 16'; Vrijsen 75'

Kopparvallen, Åtvidaberg
Referee: Tiago Martins (Portugal)

==== Group 4 ====
Pos	Team	Pld	W	D	L	GF	GA	GD	Pts	Qualification
1	Netherlands (H)	3	2	1	0	6	1	+5	7	Final tournament
2	Serbia	3	2	0	1	7	4	+3	6	
3	Norway	3	1	1	1	4	5	−1	4	
4	Switzerland	3	0	0	3	1	8	−7	0	

Source: UEFA
Rules for classification: Qualification tiebreakers
(H) Hosts
26 March 2015
16:00

Switzerland	0–1	Norway
	Report	Utvik 50'

Mardijk, Assen
Referee: Mitja Žganec (Slovenia)
26 March 2015
19:00

Netherlands	1–0	Serbia
Van Amersfoort 35'	Report

Sportpark de Bosk, Harkema
Referee: Steven McLean (Scotland)

28 March 2015
14:00

Serbia	3–1	Switzerland
Šaponjić 12', 77'; Živković 29' (pen.)	Report	Turkeš 86'

Sportpark de Bosk, Harkema
Referee: Mitja Žganec (Slovenia)
28 March 2015
17:00

Netherlands	1–1	Norway
Bazoer 80'	Report	Konradsen 52'

Mardijk, Assen
Referee: Amaury Delerue (France)

31 March 2015
19:00

Switzerland	0–4	Netherlands
	Report	Riedewald 21'; Nouri 41', 82'; Van Amersfoort 73'

Sportpark de Bosk, Harkema
Referee: Steven McLean (Scotland)
31 March 2015
19:00

Norway	2–4	Serbia
Espejord 8' (pen.); Thorsby 45+1'	Report	Jović 50', 89'; Radonjić 78'; Šaponjić 83'

Mardijk, Assen
Referee: Mitja Žganec (Slovenia)

==== Group 5 ====
Pos	Team	Pld	W	D	L	GF	GA	GD	Pts	Qualification
1	Ukraine	3	2	1	0	7	3	+4	7	Final tournament
2	Montenegro	3	2	0	1	3	3	0	6	
3	Bosnia and Herzegovina (H)	3	1	1	1	3	2	+1	4	
4	Poland	3	0	0	3	3	8	−5	0	

Source: UEFA
Rules for classification: Qualification tiebreakers
(H) Hosts
14 May 2015
17:00

Montenegro	2–1	Poland
Vujnović 55', 87'	Report	Buksa 88'

Stadion Pecara, Široki Brijeg
Referee: Thorvaldur Árnason (Iceland)
14 May 2015
17:00

Ukraine	1–1	Bosnia and Herzegovina
Shved 68'	Report	Radovac 56'

Stadion pod Bijelim Brijegom, Mostar
Referee: Tolga Özkalfa (Turkey)

16 May 2015
17:00

Montenegro	1–0	Bosnia and Herzegovina
O. Sarkic 90+4'	Report

Stadion Pecara, Široki Brijeg
Referee: Craig Pawson (England)
16 May 2015
17:00

Poland	2–4	Ukraine
Zawada 79'; Łukowski 83'	Report	Vachiberadze 16' (pen.), 66' (pen.); Arendaruk 41'; Lukyanchuk 77'

Stadion pod Bijelim Brijegom, Mostar
Referee: Tolga Özkalfa (Turkey)

19 May 2015
17:00

Ukraine	2–0	Montenegro
Zinchenko 20'; Shved 30'	Report

Stadion pod Bijelim Brijegom, Mostar
Referee: Craig Pawson (England)
19 May 2015
17:00

Bosnia and Herzegovina	2–0	Poland
Anđušić 63'; Kuzmanović 76'	Report

Vrapčići Stadium, Mostar
Referee: Thorvaldur Árnason (Iceland)

==== Group 6 ====
Pos	Team	Pld	W	D	L	GF	GA	GD	Pts	Qualification
1	Austria (H)	3	2	0	1	5	3	+2	6	Final tournament
2	Scotland	3	1	2	0	3	2	+1	5	
3	Italy	3	0	2	1	3	4	−1	2	
4	Croatia	3	0	2	1	3	5	−2	2	

Source: UEFA
Rules for classification: Qualification tiebreakers
(H) Hosts
26 March 2015
11:00

Italy	2–2	Croatia
Cerri 28'; Bonazzoli 76'	Report	Roguljić 10', 37'

Stadion Lindabrunn, Enzesfeld-Lindabrunn
Referee: Juan Martínez Munuera (Spain)
26 March 2015
19:00

Austria	1–2	Scotland
Kvasina 85'	Report	Henderson 54', 79' (pen.)

Sportzentrum Schwechat-Ranners, Schwechat
Referee: Mikhail Vilkov (Russia)

28 March 2015
11:00

Italy	0–0	Scotland
	Report

Stadion Lindabrunn, Enzesfeld-Lindabrunn
Referee: Georgi Kabakov (Belarus)
28 March 2015
14:30

Croatia	0–2	Austria
	Report	Ripić 31' (pen.); Honsak 34'

Stadion Wiener Neustadt, Wiener-Neustadt
Referee: Mikhail Vilkov (Russia)

31 March 2015
13:00

Austria	2–1	Italy
Kvasina 53'; Horvath 79'	Report	Capradossi 50'

Stadion Wiener Neustadt, Wiener-Neustadt
Referee: Juan Martínez Munuera (Spain)
31 March 2015
13:00

Scotland	1–1	Croatia
McBurnie 65'	Report	Bašić 19'

Stadion Lindabrunn, Enzesfeld-Lindabrunn
Referee: Georgi Kabakov (Belarus)

==== Group 7 ====
Pos	Team	Pld	W	D	L	GF	GA	GD	Pts	Qualification
1	France (H)	3	3	0	0	6	1	+5	9	Final tournament
2	England	3	2	0	1	5	4	+1	6	
3	Denmark	3	1	0	2	5	5	0	3	
4	Azerbaijan	3	0	0	3	0	6	−6	0	

Source: UEFA
Rules for classification: Qualification tiebreakers
(H) Hosts
26 March 2015
18:00

England	3–2	Denmark
Brown 33'; Pedersen 45+1' (o.g.); Smith-Brown 82'	Report	Ingvartsen 7'; Skov 41'

Stade Henry Jeanne, Bayeux
Referee: Marco Guida (Italy)
26 March 2015
19:30

France	2–0	Azerbaijan
Coman 61', 90'	Report

Stade Louis Villemer, Saint-Lô
Referee: Nikola Dabanović (Montenegro)

28 March 2015
17:00

Denmark	0–2	France
	Report	Guirassy 42', 65'

Stade du Hazé, Flers
Referee: Nikolas Dabanović (Montenegro)
28 March 2015
18:30

England	1–0	Azerbaijan
Smith-Brown 37'	Report

Stade Henry Jeanne, Bayeux
Referee: Adrien Jaccottet (Switzerland)

31 March 2015
19:00

France	2–1	England
Guirassy 31'; Cornet 50'	Report	Roberts 80'

Stade Louis Villemer, Saint-Lô
Referee: Marco Guida (Italy)
31 March 2015
19:00

Azerbaijan	0–3	Denmark
	Report	Gartenmann 41', 59'; Duelund 83'

Stade du Hazé, Flers
Referee: Adrien Jaccottet (Switzerland)

== Qualified teams ==
The following eight teams qualified for the final tournament.

Team	Qualified as	Qualified on	Previous appearances in tournament^{1} only U-19 era (since 2002)
Greece	Hosts	20 March 2012	5 (2005, 2007, 2008, 2011, 2012)
Spain	Elite round Group 1 winners	3 June 2015	10 (**2002**, **2004**, **2006**, **2007**, 2008, 2009, 2010, **2011**, **2012**, 2013)
Germany	Elite round Group 2 winners	31 March 2015	6 (2002, 2004, 2005, 2007, **2008**, **2014**)
Russia	Elite round Group 3 winners	28 March 2015	1 (2007)
Netherlands	Elite round Group 4 winners	31 March 2015	2 (2010, 2013)
Ukraine	Elite round Group 5 winners	19 May 2015	3 (2004, **2009**, 2014)
Austria	Elite round Group 6 winners	31 March 2015	5 (2003, 2006, 2007, 2010, 2014)
France	Elite round Group 7 winners	31 March 2015	7 (2003, **2005**, 2007, 2009, **2010**, 2012, 2013)

^{1} Bold indicates champion for that year. Italic indicates host for that year.

== Top goalscorers ==
The following players scored four goals or more in the qualifying competition.

10 goals

- (Russia) Ramil Sheydayev

5 goals

- (Austria) Marko Kvasina
- (England) Patrick Roberts
- (Italy) Federico Bonazzoli
- (Netherlands) Abdelhak Nouri
- (Slovakia) Tomáš Vestenický
- (Switzerland) Nicolas Hunziker

4 goals

- (England) Bradley Fewster
- (Germany) Lucas Cueto
- (Germany) Timo Werner
- (Montenegro) Nikola Vujnović
- (Russia) Rifat Zhemaletdinov
- (Slovenia) Alen Ožbolt
- (Spain) Borja Mayoral
- (Switzerland) Aldin Turkes
- (Turkey) Enes Ünal
