= Moldova national under-19 football team =

Moldova Under-19
- Nickname: Tricolorii juniori (The Junior Tricolours)
- Association: Moldovan Football Federation (FMF)
- Confederation: UEFA (Europe)
- Head coach: Simion Bulgaru
- Home stadium: Various
- FIFA code: MDA
First colours	Second colours

First international
- Official: Belarus 3–4 Moldova (Kyustendil, Bulgaria; 13 September 1994)

Biggest win
- Moldova 5–0 Gibraltar (Sliven, Bulgaria; 14 November 2026)

Biggest defeat
- Moldova 0–9 England (Irthlingborough, England; 5 November 2002)
- Website: fmf.md (in Romanian)

The Moldova national under-19 football team represents Moldova in international football at this age level and is controlled by the Moldovan Football Federation, the governing body for football in Moldova. The team competes to qualify for the UEFA European Under-19 Championship held every year. Since the establishment of the Moldovan under-19 team, the under-19 side has never reached a final tournament of the UEFA European Under-19 Championship. Players born on or after 1 January 2008 are eligible for the 2027 UEFA European Under-19 Championship qualification. They are currently coached by Simion Bulgaru.

== Results and fixtures ==
The following is a list of match results in the last 12 months, as well as any future matches that have been scheduled.

Win Draw Loss Fixture

=== 2025 ===
12 November 2025 2026 UEFA Euro Under-19 qualifying	Italy	8–0	Moldova	Acireale, Italy
	Ciardi 5', 58'; Mosconi 13'; Coletta 16'; Sala 20'; Cocchi 69'; Cacciamani 72'; Cerpelletti 83'	Report		Stadium: Stadio Aci e Galatea; Attendance: 2,500; Referee: Mihály Káprály (Hungary)

15 November 2025 2026 UEFA Euro Under-19 qualifying	Poland	2–1	Moldova	Acireale, Italy
	Bzdyl 25', 51'	Report	Caragheorghi 31'	Stadium: Stadio Aci e Galatea; Attendance: 88; Referee: Igor Stojchevski (North Macedonia)

18 November 2025 2026 UEFA Euro Under-19 qualifying	Moldova	1–0	Bosnia and Herzegovina	Acireale, Italy
	Bejenaru 16'	Report		Stadium: Stadio Aci e Galatea; Attendance: 50; Referee: Igor Stojchevski (North Macedonia)

=== 2026 ===
25 February 2026 Friendly	Moldova	1–2	Azerbaijan	Vadul lui Vodă, Moldova
	Negură 39'	Report	Narimanov 61'; Babayev 83'	Stadium: Stadionul CPSM; Referee: Ion Orlic (Moldova)

27 February 2026 Friendly	Moldova	1–0	Azerbaijan	Vadul lui Vodă, Moldova
	Jeju 85'	Report		Stadium: Stadionul CPSM; Referee: Andrei Breguța (Moldova)

25 March 2026 2027 UEFA Euro Under-19 qualifying round 1	Netherlands	1–0	Moldova	Groesbeek, Netherlands
	Reulen 26' (pen.)	Report		Stadium: Sportpark Zuid; Attendance: 450; Referee: Mateo Erceg (Croatia)

28 March 2026 2027 UEFA Euro Under-19 qualifying round 1	Faroe Islands	0–2	Moldova	Groesbeek, Netherlands
		Report	Roșca 45'; Cornescu 90+1'	Stadium: Sportpark Zuid; Attendance: 42; Referee: Daniyar Sakhi (Kazakhstan)

31 March 2026 2027 UEFA Euro Under-19 qualifying round 1	Moldova	1–1	North Macedonia	Escharen, Netherlands
	Roșca 21'	Report	Tanchev 54'	Stadium: Sportpark De Kranenhof; Attendance: 65; Referee: Mateo Erceg (Croatia)

27 September 2026 Friendly	Moldova	2–1	Cyprus	Tiraspol, Transnistria, Moldova
	Negură 33'; Marciuc 88'	Report	Kalogirou 64'	Stadium: Malaya Sportivnaya Arena; Referee: Andrei Breguța (Moldova)

29 September 2026 Friendly	Moldova	0–1	Cyprus	Tiraspol, Transnistria, Moldova
		Report	Mylona 52'	Stadium: Malaya Sportivnaya Arena; Referee: Igor Boșca (Moldova)

11 November 2026 2027 UEFA Euro Under-19 qualifying round 2	Latvia	v	Moldova	Sliven, Bulgaria
		Report		Stadium: Stadion Hadzhi Dimitar

14 November 2026 2027 UEFA Euro Under-19 qualifying round 2	Moldova	v	Gibraltar	Sliven, Bulgaria
		Report		Stadium: Stadion Hadzhi Dimitar

17 November 2026 2027 UEFA Euro Under-19 qualifying round 2	Moldova	v	Bulgaria	Stara Zagora, Bulgaria
		Report		Stadium: Stadion Beroe

=== 2027 UEFA European Under-19 Championship qualification ===
==== Group 4 ====
Pos	Team	Pld	W	D	L	GF	GA	GD	Pts	Promotion or transfer
1	Bulgaria (H)	0	0	0	0	0	0	0	0	Promotion to Round 3 League A
2	Moldova	0	0	0	0	0	0	0	0	Transfer to Round 3 League B
3	Latvia	0	0	0	0	0	0	0	0	Transfer to Round 3 League B
4	Gibraltar	0	0	0	0	0	0	0	0	Transfer to Round 3 League B

First match(es) will be played: 11 November 2026. Source: UEFA
Rules for classification: Tiebreakers
(H) Hosts

== Players ==
=== Current squad ===
The following players were selected for the 2027 UEFA Euro U19 qualifying matches against Latvia, Gibraltar and Bulgaria on 11, 14 and 17 November 2026, respectively.

Squad is correct as of 29 September 2026, after the match against Cyprus.

No.	Pos.	Player	Date of birth (age)	Club
1	GK	Nichita Lebedev	15 April 2008 (age 18)	(Moldovan Football Federation) Zimbru-2 Chișinău
23	GK	Hector Sula	20 June 2007 (age 19)	(Royal Spanish Football Federation) Montañesa
2	DF	Pedro Izbișciuc	3 April 2008 (age 18)	(Portuguese Football Federation) Rio Ave U19
3	DF	Nichita Pavlenco (captain)	12 February 2008 (age 18)	(Moldovan Football Federation) Sheriff Tiraspol U19
4	DF	Eugen Macarov	22 February 2008 (age 18)	(German Football Association) DJK Ingolstadt U19
5	DF	Artemii Mura	4 September 2008 (age 18)	(Moldovan Football Federation) Zimbru-2 Chișinău
6	DF	Alexandru Negură	16 September 2008 (age 18)	(Moldovan Football Federation) Politehnica UTM
14	DF	Dumitru Marciuc	3 November 2008 (age 18)	(Moldovan Football Federation) Politehnica UTM
15	DF	Bogdan Puiu	22 September 2008 (age 18)	(Moldovan Football Federation) Zimbru Chișinău U19
16	DF	Victor Moiseev		(Moldovan Football Federation) Dacia Buiucani U19
24	DF	Maxim Labic	29 December 2008 (age 17)	(Moldovan Football Federation) Politehnica UTM
7	MF	Andrei Fenin	7 March 2007 (age 19)	(Moldovan Football Federation) Sheriff Tiraspol U19
8	MF	Ivan Jeju	11 September 2008 (age 18)	(Moldovan Football Federation) Sheriff Tiraspol U19
13	MF	Iustin Cornescu	18 July 2008 (age 18)	(Italian Football Federation) Sassuolo Primavera
20	MF	Alexandru Robu		(Moldovan Football Federation) Zimbru Chișinău U19
9	MF	Nikita Șarpe	1 April 2008 (age 18)	(Romanian Football Federation) Sepsi OSK II
10	FW	Nichita Josan	9 March 2008 (age 18)	(Chinese Taipei Football Association) Taichung Rock
11	FW	Justin Gușan	27 August 2008 (age 18)	(Portuguese Football Federation) Farense U19
17	FW	Bogdan Roșca	6 February 2008 (age 18)	(Moldovan Football Federation) Real Sireți
	FW	Stanislav Burlaciuc	16 February 2009 (age 17)	(Moldovan Football Federation) Academia Rebeja-UTM

== Coaching staff ==
Position	Staff
Head coach	(Moldova) Simion Bulgaru
Assistant coach	(Moldova) Sergiu Epureanu
Assistant coach	(Moldova) Dmitrii Grebenco
Goalkeeping coach	(Moldova) Serghei Botnaraș
Doctor	(Moldova) Andrei Secureanu

Last updated: 9 March 2026
Source: FMF

== Competition history ==
Until the 1997 tournament, players born on or after 1 August the year they turned 19 years were eligible to compete. Since the 1998 tournament, the date limit has been moved back to 1 January. Starting with qualification for the 2002 tournament, the competition was renamed from Under-18 Championship to Under-19 Championship, but the eligibility rules did not change.

=== UEFA U-18/19 European Championship ===
Under-18 era, 1995–2001
Under-19 era, 2002–present

Hosted tournament Hosted qualifying

UEFA U-18/19 European Championship record										UEFA U-18/19 Qualification record								
Year	Round	Pld	W	D	L	GF	GA	GD	Squad	Pld	W	D	L	GF	GA	GD	Campaign	
(Greece) 1995	Did not qualify									2	1	0	1	6	7	−1	1995	
(France) (Luxembourg) 1996	Did not qualify									2	0	0	2	3	5	−2	1996	
(Iceland) 1997	Did not qualify									3	0	0	3	2	9	−7	1997	
(Cyprus) 1998	Did not qualify									2	1	0	1	1	1	0	1998	
(Sweden) 1999	Did not qualify									3	1	0	2	2	4	−2	1999	
(Germany) 2000	Did not qualify									3	0	1	2	2	12	−10	2000	
(Finland) 2001	Did not qualify									3	0	1	2	1	8	−7	2001	
(Norway) 2002	Did not qualify									3	0	1	2	0	6	−6	2002	
(Liechtenstein) 2003	Did not qualify									3	0	0	3	3	17	−14	2003	
(Switzerland) 2004	Did not qualify									3	0	2	1	3	4	−1	2004	
(Northern Ireland) 2005	Did not qualify									6	1	2	3	4	10	−6	2005	2005
(Poland) 2006	Did not qualify									3	0	0	3	1	7	−6	2006	
(Austria) 2007	Did not qualify									3	1	0	2	3	7	−4	2007	
(Czech Republic) 2008	Did not qualify									6	2	2	2	5	5	0	2008	2008
(Ukraine) 2009	Did not qualify									3	0	1	2	2	5	−3	2009	
(France) 2010	Did not qualify									3	1	0	2	2	7	−5	2010	
(Romania) 2011	Did not qualify									6	1	1	4	3	17	−14	2011	2011
(Estonia) 2012	Did not qualify									3	0	0	3	2	11	−9	2012	
(Lithuania) 2013	Did not qualify									3	0	1	2	1	10	−9	2013	
(Hungary) 2014	Did not qualify									3	0	0	3	0	11	−11	2014	
(Greece) 2015	Did not qualify									3	1	0	2	3	8	−5	2015	
(Germany) 2016	Did not qualify									3	0	0	3	1	4	−3	2016	
(Georgia (country)) 2017	Did not qualify									3	0	0	3	0	4	−4	2017	
(Finland) 2018	Did not qualify									3	1	0	2	3	7	−4	2018	
(Armenia) 2019	Did not qualify									3	0	1	2	1	8	−7	2019	
(Northern Ireland) ~~2020~~	Did not qualify									3	0	0	3	0	13	−13	2020	
(Slovakia) 2022	Did not qualify									3	0	1	2	2	12	−10	2022	
(Malta) 2023	Did not qualify									3	0	0	3	0	8	−8	2023	
(Northern Ireland) 2024	Did not qualify									3	0	0	3	1	8	−7	2024	
(Romania) 2025	Did not qualify									3	0	2	1	2	3	−1	2025	
(Wales) 2026	Did not qualify									3	1	0	2	2	10	−8	2026	
(Czech Republic) 2027	Did not qualify									6	2	1	3	11	12	−1	2027	2027
(Bulgaria) 2028	To be determined									To be determined								
(Netherlands) 2029	To be determined									To be determined								
Total	0/32									105	14	17	74	72	260	−188		

== Head-to-head record ==
Friendly games are not included and correct as of last competitive match played on 17 November 2026.

Opponents	Pld	W	D	L	GF	GA	GD
Albania	0	0	0	0	0	0	0
Andorra	1	1	0	0	2	1	+1
Armenia	0	0	0	0	0	0	0
Austria	0	0	0	0	0	0	0
Azerbaijan	4	2	2	0	4	2	+2
Belarus	2	1	1	0	4	3	+1
Belgium	1	0	0	1	2	3	−1
Bosnia and Herzegovina	1	1	0	0	1	0	+1
Bulgaria	3	0	1	2	5	12	−7
Croatia	2	0	0	2	0	7	−7
Cyprus	2	0	1	1	2	3	−1
Czechia	2	0	0	2	0	7	−7
Denmark	1	0	1	0	1	1	0
England	3	0	0	3	0	14	−14
Estonia	1	1	0	0	3	0	+3
Faroe Islands	1	1	0	0	2	0	+2
Finland	2	0	0	2	4	10	−6
France	0	0	0	0	0	0	0
Georgia	2	0	0	2	1	4	−3
Germany	1	0	0	1	0	5	−5
Gibraltar	1	1	0	0	5	0	+5
Greece	3	1	1	1	3	3	0
Hungary	1	1	0	0	1	0	+1
Iceland	3	0	1	2	3	5	−2
Ireland	4	0	1	3	0	6	−6
Israel	4	0	1	3	2	11	−9
Italy	5	0	1	4	2	20	−18
Kazakhstan	0	0	0	0	0	0	0
Kosovo	0	0	0	0	0	0	0
Latvia	3	0	0	3	1	10	−9
Liechtenstein	0	0	0	0	0	0	0
Lithuania	2	1	0	1	2	1	+1
Luxembourg	1	1	0	0	2	1	+1
Malta	1	0	0	1	0	1	−1
Montenegro	0	0	0	0	0	0	0
Netherlands	9	0	2	7	0	21	−21
North Macedonia	2	0	1	1	2	3	−1
Northern Ireland	4	0	0	4	2	14	−12
Norway	1	0	0	1	0	4	−4
Poland	4	0	2	2	2	6	−4
Portugal	3	0	0	3	1	7	−6
Romania	2	0	0	2	2	11	−9
Russia	2	0	0	2	1	4	−3
San Marino	0	0	0	0	0	0	0
Scotland	1	1	0	0	1	0	+1
Serbia	3	0	0	3	1	11	−10
Slovakia	1	0	0	1	0	7	−7
Slovenia	3	0	1	2	2	7	−5
Spain	1	0	0	1	0	5	−5
Sweden	3	0	0	3	0	9	−9
Switzerland	1	0	0	1	2	3	−1
Turkey	2	0	0	2	0	4	−4
Ukraine	3	1	0	2	3	4	−1
Wales	3	0	0	3	1	10	−9
Total	105	14	17	74	72	260	−188

== See also ==
- Moldova national football team
- Moldova national under-21 football team
- Moldova national under-17 football team
