= 1996 UEFA European Under-18 Championship qualifying =

Football tournament qualification stage

This article features the 1996 UEFA European Under-18 Championship qualifying stage. Matches were played 1995 through 1996. Two qualifying rounds were organised and seven teams qualified for the main tournament, joining host France.

== Round 1 ==
=== Group 1 ===
All matches were played in Austria.

Teams	Pld	W	D	L	GF	GA	GD	Pts
FR Yugoslavia	2	2	0	0	6	0	+6	~~6~~ DSQ by UEFA
Austria	2	1	0	1	3	4	–1	3
Georgia	2	0	0	2	1	6	–5	0

Austria	0–3	FR Yugoslavia
Georgia	1–3	Austria
FR Yugoslavia	3–0	Georgia

=== Group 2 ===
Teams	Pld	W	D	L	GF	GA	GD	Pts
Greece	4	3	1	0	11	2	+9	10
Switzerland	4	2	1	1	6	6	0	7
Luxembourg	4	0	0	4	0	9	–9	0

Luxembourg	0–3	Switzerland
Switzerland	1–5	Greece
Luxembourg	0–2	Greece
Switzerland	1–0	Luxembourg
Greece	1–1	Switzerland
Greece	3–0	Luxembourg

=== Group 3 ===
Teams	Pld	W	D	L	GF	GA	GD	Pts
Italy	4	4	0	0	9	0	+9	12
Bulgaria	4	2	0	2	4	3	+1	6
Malta	4	0	0	4	0	10	–10	0

Italy	2–0	Bulgaria
Bulgaria	3–0	Malta
Italy	5–0	Malta
Bulgaria	0–1	Italy
Malta	0–1	Italy
Malta	0–1	Bulgaria

=== Group 4 ===
Teams	Pld	W	D	L	GF	GA	GD	Pts
Russia	4	2	1	1	9	6	+3	7
Turkey	4	1	2	1	4	4	0	5
Czech Republic	4	1	1	2	3	6	–3	4

Czech Republic	2–1	Russia
Russia	4–1	Czech Republic
Russia	1–1	Turkey
Turkey	0–0	Czech Republic
Czech Republic	0–1	Turkey
Turkey	2–3	Russia

=== Group 5 ===
All matches were played in Israel.

Teams	Pld	W	D	L	GF	GA	GD	Pts
Hungary	2	1	1	0	4	1	+3	4
Israel	2	1	1	0	3	2	+1	4
Azerbaijan	2	0	0	2	1	5	–4	0

Israel	2–1	Azerbaijan
Azerbaijan	0–3	Hungary
Hungary	1–1	Israel

=== Group 6 ===
All matches were played in Germany.

Teams	Pld	W	D	L	GF	GA	GD	Pts
Germany	2	2	0	0	5	2	+3	6
Croatia	2	1	0	1	3	4	–1	3
Romania	2	0	0	2	0	2	–2	0

Romania	0–1	Germany
Croatia	1–0	Romania
Germany	4–2	Croatia

=== Group 7 ===
All matches were played in Belgium.

Teams	Pld	W	D	L	GF	GA	GD	Pts
Belgium	2	2	0	0	6	3	+3	6
Slovenia	2	1	0	1	3	4	–1	3
Moldova	2	0	0	2	3	5	–2	0

Belgium	3–1	Slovenia
Slovenia	2–1	Moldova
Moldova	2–3	Belgium

=== Group 8 ===
All matches were played in Denmark.

Teams	Pld	W	D	L	GF	GA	GD	Pts
Portugal	2	2	0	0	4	0	+4	6
Denmark	2	1	0	1	2	1	+1	3
North Macedonia	2	0	0	2	0	5	–5	0

North Macedonia	0–2	Denmark
Portugal	3–0	North Macedonia
Denmark	0–1	Portugal

=== Group 9 ===
All matches were played in the Netherlands.

Teams	Pld	W	D	L	GF	GA	GD	Pts
Netherlands	2	2	0	0	14	4	+10	6
Cyprus	2	1	0	1	3	5	–2	3
Armenia	2	0	0	2	2	10	–8	0

Cyprus	2–5	Netherlands
Armenia	0–1	Cyprus
Netherlands	9–2	Armenia

=== Group 10 ===
All matches were played in Slovakia.

Teams	Pld	W	D	L	GF	GA	GD	Pts
Spain	2	1	1	0	2	1	+1	4
Ukraine	2	1	0	1	5	3	+2	3
Slovakia	2	0	1	1	1	4	–3	1

Spain	2–1	Ukraine
Slovakia	1–4	Ukraine
Spain	0–0	Slovakia

=== Group 11 ===
All matches were played in Poland.

Teams	Pld	W	D	L	GF	GA	GD	Pts
Norway	2	2	0	0	11	2	+9	6
Poland	2	1	0	1	6	4	+2	3
Faroe Islands	2	0	0	2	0	11	–11	0

Faroe Islands	0–4	Poland
Norway	7–0	Faroe Islands
Poland	2–4	Norway

=== Group 12 ===
All matches were played in Lithuania.

Teams	Pld	W	D	L	GF	GA	GD	Pts
Scotland	2	2	0	0	5	1	+4	6
Lithuania	2	1	0	1	4	2	+2	3
Estonia	2	0	0	2	2	8	–6	0

Estonia	1–4	Lithuania
Scotland	4–1	Estonia
Lithuania	0–1	Scotland

=== Group 13 ===
All matches were played in England.

Teams	Pld	W	D	L	GF	GA	GD	Pts
England	2	2	0	0	8	2	+6	6
Sweden	2	1	0	1	5	7	–2	3
Latvia	2	0	0	2	1	5	–4	0

Sweden	3–1	Latvia
Latvia	0–2	England
England	6–2	Sweden

=== Group 14 ===
Teams	Pld	W	D	L	GF	GA	GD	Pts
Republic of Ireland	4	3	1	0	11	2	+9	10
Wales	4	2	1	1	5	5	0	7
Finland	4	0	0	4	4	13	–9	0

Finland	2–5	Republic of Ireland
Wales	3–2	Finland
Republic of Ireland	0–0	Wales
Finland	0–2	Wales
Republic of Ireland	3–0	Finland
Wales	0–3	Republic of Ireland

=== Group 15 ===
All matches were played in Northern Ireland.

Teams	Pld	W	D	L	GF	GA	GD	Pts
Iceland	2	1	1	0	3	2	+1	4
Northern Ireland	2	1	0	1	4	3	+1	3
Belarus	2	0	1	1	0	2	–2	1

Northern Ireland	2–0	Belarus
Belarus	0–0	Iceland
Iceland	3–2	Northern Ireland

== Round 2 ==
=== Group 1 ===
Teams	Pld	W	D	L	GF	GA	GD	Pts
Italy	4	3	1	0	9	1	+8	10
Greece	4	2	0	2	3	7	–4	6
Austria	4	0	1	3	0	4	–4	1

Italy	4–0	Greece
Greece	1–3	Italy
Greece	1–0	Austria
Italy	2–0	Austria
Austria	0–1	Greece
Austria	0–0	Italy

=== Groups 2-7 ===
Team 1	Agg.	Team 2	1st leg	2nd leg
Russia	2–5	Hungary	2–4	0–1
Germany	1–2	Belgium	0–0	1–2
Portugal	4–3	Netherlands	4–1	0–2
Spain	7–1	Norway	3–1	4–0
Scotland	0–6	England	0–3	0–3
Republic of Ireland	3–2	Iceland	2–1	1–1

== See also ==
- 1996 UEFA European Under-18 Championship
