= 2005 UEFA European Under-19 Championship qualification =

The 2005 UEFA European Under-19 Championship qualifying competition was a men's under-19 football competition played in 2004 and 2005 to determine the seven teams joining Northern Ireland, who qualified automatically as hosts, in the 2005 UEFA European Under-19 Championship final tournament.

== Qualifying round ==
A total of 25 teams (12 group winners, 12 group runners-up and the third-placed team that performed best against the numbers 1 and 2 of its group) entered the elite qualification.

=== Byes ===
The following teams received a bye for this round:

- Czech Republic
- England
- Northern Ireland (main tournament host)
- Spain

=== Group 1 ===
Team	Pld	W	D	L	GF	GA	GD	Pts
Hungary	3	2	0	1	5	2	+3	6
Greece	3	1	1	1	6	2	+4	4
Wales	3	1	1	1	2	3	−1	4
Faroe Islands (H)	3	1	0	2	3	9	−6	3

(H) Hosts

All matches were played in the Faroe Islands.

Greece	5–0	Faroe Islands
Hungary	0–1	Wales
Greece	0–0	Wales
Faroe Islands	0–3	Hungary
Hungary	2–1	Greece
Wales	1–3	Faroe Islands

=== Group 2 ===
Team	Pld	W	D	L	GF	GA	GD	Pts
Ukraine (H)	3	2	0	1	3	2	+1	6
Poland	3	1	1	1	4	3	+1	4
Moldova	3	1	1	1	3	3	0	4
Switzerland	3	1	0	2	4	6	−2	3

(H) Hosts

All matches were played in Ukraine. This group brought forth the best third placed team. Moldova performed best against group winners and runners-up Ukraine and Poland, achieving 4 points and a goal difference of +1 (1-0).

Poland	3–1	Switzerland
Ukraine	0–1	Moldova
Poland	0–0	Moldova
Switzerland	0–1	Ukraine
Ukraine	2–1	Poland
Moldova	2–3	Switzerland

=== Group 3 ===
Team	Pld	W	D	L	GF	GA	GD	Pts
Serbia and Montenegro	3	2	1	0	7	3	+4	7
Germany	3	1	2	0	5	2	+3	5
Slovenia (H)	3	1	0	2	4	8	−4	3
Latvia	3	0	1	2	2	5	−3	1

(H) Hosts

All matches were played in Slovenia.

Germany	3–0	Slovenia
Serbia and Montenegro	2–0	Latvia
Germany	1–1	Latvia
Slovenia	2–4	Serbia and Montenegro
Serbia and Montenegro	1–1	Germany
Latvia	1–2	Slovenia

=== Group 4 ===
Team	Pld	W	D	L	GF	GA	GD	Pts
France	3	3	0	0	9	2	+7	9
Armenia	3	1	1	1	4	4	0	4
Macedonia (H)	3	1	0	2	3	6	−3	3
Azerbaijan	3	0	1	2	1	5	−4	1

(H) Hosts

All matches were played in North Macedonia.

Macedonia	1–0	Azerbaijan
France	2–1	Armenia
Macedonia	1–2	Armenia
Azerbaijan	0–3	France
France	4–1	Macedonia
Armenia	1–1	Azerbaijan

=== Group 5 ===
Team	Pld	W	D	L	GF	GA	GD	Pts
Slovakia (H)	3	2	0	1	7	6	+1	6
Lithuania	3	2	0	1	5	5	0	6
Georgia	3	1	1	1	7	6	+1	4
Malta	3	0	1	2	2	4	−2	1

(H) Hosts

All matches were played in Slovakia.

Slovakia	2–4	Georgia
Lithuania	1–0	Malta
Slovakia	2–1	Malta
Georgia	2–3	Lithuania
Lithuania	1–3	Slovakia
Malta	1–1	Georgia

=== Group 6 ===
Team	Pld	W	D	L	GF	GA	GD	Pts
Albania	3	2	0	1	5	7	−2	6
Denmark	3	2	0	1	6	6	0	6
Finland	3	1	1	1	10	5	+5	4
Luxembourg	3	0	1	2	2	5	−3	1

All matches were played in Denmark.

Finland	1–1	Luxembourg
Denmark	0–3	Albania
Finland	7–1	Albania
Luxembourg	1–3	Denmark
Denmark	3–2	Finland
Albania	1–0	Luxembourg

=== Group 7 ===
Team	Pld	W	D	L	GF	GA	GD	Pts
Netherlands	3	3	0	0	11	1	+10	9
Israel	3	1	1	1	5	2	+3	4
Belarus	3	1	1	1	4	5	−1	4
Estonia	3	0	0	3	2	14	−12	0

All matches were played in Israel.

Estonia	0–6	Netherlands
Belarus	0–0	Israel
Netherlands	3–0	Belarus
Estonia	0–4	Israel
Netherlands	2–1	Israel
Estonia	2–4	Belarus

=== Group 8 ===
Team	Pld	W	D	L	GF	GA	GD	Pts
Belgium	3	2	1	0	8	2	+6	7
Scotland	3	1	2	0	7	3	+4	5
Turkey	3	1	1	1	13	5	+8	4
San Marino	3	0	0	3	0	18	−18	0

All matches were played in Belgium.

Scotland	4–0	San Marino
Belgium	3–1	Turkey
Scotland	2–2	Turkey
San Marino	0–4	Belgium
Belgium	1–1	Scotland
Turkey	10–0	San Marino

=== Group 9 ===
Team	Pld	W	D	L	GF	GA	GD	Pts
Russia	3	2	0	1	11	3	+8	6
Republic of Ireland	3	2	0	1	6	2	+4	6
Cyprus	3	2	0	1	7	5	+2	6
Andorra	3	0	0	3	0	14	−14	0

All matches were played in Cyprus.

Russia	5–1	Cyprus
Republic of Ireland	4–0	Andorra
Russia	5–0	Andorra
Cyprus	1–0	Republic of Ireland
Republic of Ireland	2–1	Russia
Andorra	0–5	Cyprus

=== Group 10 ===
Team	Pld	W	D	L	GF	GA	GD	Pts
Sweden	3	3	0	0	9	2	+7	9
Croatia	3	1	1	1	9	5	+4	4
Romania	3	1	1	1	5	5	0	4
Liechtenstein	3	0	0	3	1	12	−11	0

All matches were played in Croatia.

Romania	1–2	Sweden
Croatia	6–0	Liechtenstein
Romania	2–1	Liechtenstein
Sweden	3–1	Croatia
Croatia	2–2	Romania
Liechtenstein	0–4	Sweden

=== Group 11 ===
Team	Pld	W	D	L	GF	GA	GD	Pts
Portugal	3	2	1	0	6	1	+5	7
Italy	3	2	1	0	4	0	+4	7
Kazakhstan	3	1	0	2	1	4	−3	3
Bosnia and Herzegovina	3	0	0	3	1	7	−6	0

All matches were played in Italy.

Italy	2–0	Bosnia and Herzegovina
Portugal	2–0	Kazakhstan
Italy	2–0	Kazakhstan
Bosnia and Herzegovina	1–4	Portugal
Portugal	0–0	Italy
Kazakhstan	1–0	Bosnia and Herzegovina

=== Group 12 ===
Team	Pld	W	D	L	GF	GA	GD	Pts
Austria	3	2	1	0	7	2	+5	7
Norway	3	2	1	0	6	1	+5	7
Iceland	3	1	0	2	5	10	−5	3
Bulgaria	3	0	0	3	3	8	−5	0

All matches were played in Norway.

Norway	3–0	Iceland
Austria	2–0	Bulgaria
Norway	3–1	Bulgaria
Iceland	2–5	Austria
Austria	0–0	Norway
Bulgaria	2–3	Iceland

== Elite round ==
This elite qualification saw seven group winners qualify for the main tournament in Northern Ireland.

=== Teams ===
The following teams qualified for this round:

12 group winners from the first qualifying round

- Austria
- Albania
- Belgium
- France
- Hungary
- Netherlands
- Portugal
- Russia
- Serbia and Montenegro
- Slovakia
- Sweden
- Ukraine

12 group runners-up from the first qualifying round

- Armenia
- Croatia
- Denmark
- Germany
- Greece
- Italy
- Israel
- Lithuania
- Norway
- Poland
- Republic of Ireland
- Scotland

1 best group third-place finisher from the first qualifying round

- Moldova

3 teams received a bye for the first qualifying round

- Czech Republic
- England
- Spain

=== Group 1 ===
Team	Pld	W	D	L	GF	GA	GD	Pts
England	3	3	0	0	3	0	+3	9
Sweden	3	2	0	1	8	3	+5	6
Denmark	3	0	1	2	3	5	−2	1
Moldova	3	0	1	2	1	7	−6	1

All matches were played in England.

England	1–0	Denmark
Moldova	0–5	Sweden
England	1–0	Sweden
Denmark	1–1	Moldova
Moldova	0–1	England
Sweden	3–2	Denmark

=== Group 2 ===
Team	Pld	W	D	L	GF	GA	GD	Pts
Germany	3	3	0	0	7	1	+6	9
Czech Republic	3	1	0	2	3	4	−1	3
Netherlands	3	1	0	2	2	4	−2	3
Croatia	3	1	0	2	2	5	−3	3

All matches were played in the Czech Republic.

Czech Republic	0–2	Netherlands
Germany	3–0	Croatia
Czech Republic	2–0	Croatia
Netherlands	0–2	Germany
Croatia	2–0	Netherlands
Germany	2–1	Czech Republic

=== Group 3 ===
Team	Pld	W	D	L	GF	GA	GD	Pts
France	3	3	0	0	5	2	+3	9
Spain	3	2	0	1	5	1	+4	6
Israel	3	1	0	2	2	4	−2	3
Portugal	3	0	0	3	2	7	−5	0

All matches were played in Spain.

Spain	3–0	Israel
France	3–2	Portugal
Spain	2–0	Portugal
Israel	0–1	France
France	1–0	Spain
Portugal	0–2	Israel

=== Group 4 ===
Team	Pld	W	D	L	GF	GA	GD	Pts
Armenia	3	2	1	0	6	1	+5	7
Belgium	3	2	0	1	6	2	+4	6
Italy	3	1	1	1	3	2	+1	4
Hungary	3	0	0	3	2	12	−10	0

All matches were played in Hungary.

Hungary	1–4	Belgium
Armenia	0–0	Italy
Hungary	0–3	Italy
Belgium	0–1	Armenia
Italy	0–2	Belgium
Armenia	5–1	Hungary

=== Group 5 ===
Team	Pld	W	D	L	GF	GA	GD	Pts
Greece	3	3	0	0	5	1	+4	9
Scotland	3	2	0	1	5	3	+2	6
Slovakia	3	1	0	2	2	4	−2	3
Austria	3	0	0	3	3	7	−4	0

All matches were played in Austria.

Greece	1–0	Scotland
Slovakia	2–0	Austria
Greece	2–1	Austria
Scotland	2–0	Slovakia
Slovakia	0–2	Greece
Austria	2–3	Scotland

=== Group 6 ===
Team	Pld	W	D	L	GF	GA	GD	Pts
Norway	3	2	1	0	8	2	+6	7
Ukraine	3	2	0	1	5	5	0	6
Russia	3	1	1	1	4	2	+2	4
Lithuania	3	0	0	3	0	8	−8	0

All matches were played in Russia.

Ukraine	1–0	Russia
Lithuania	0–2	Norway
Ukraine	1–5	Norway
Russia	3–0	Lithuania
Lithuania	0–3	Ukraine
Norway	1–1	Russia

=== Group 7 ===
Team	Pld	W	D	L	GF	GA	GD	Pts
Serbia and Montenegro	3	3	0	0	10	2	+8	9
Poland	3	2	0	1	4	2	+2	6
Republic of Ireland	3	0	1	2	1	3	−2	1
Albania	3	0	1	2	2	10	−8	1

All matches were played in Serbia and Montenegro.

Poland	1–0	Republic of Ireland
Albania	1–7	Serbia and Montenegro
Poland	1–2	Serbia and Montenegro
Republic of Ireland	1–1	Albania
Albania	0–2	Poland
Serbia and Montenegro	1–0	Republic of Ireland

== See also ==
- 2005 UEFA European Under-19 Championship
