= 1995 UEFA European Under-18 Championship qualifying =

Football tournament qualification stage

This article features the 1995 UEFA European Under-18 Championship qualifying stage. Matches were played 1994 through 1995. Two qualifying rounds were organised and seven teams qualified for the main tournament, joining host Greece.

== Round 1 ==
=== Group 1 ===
All matches were played in Germany.

Teams	Pld	W	D	L	GF	GA	GD	Pts
Northern Ireland	2	2	0	0	6	0	+6	4
Germany	2	1	0	1	8	1	+7	2
Faroe Islands	2	0	0	2	0	13	–13	0

Germany	8–0	Faroe Islands
Faroe Islands	0–5	Northern Ireland
Northern Ireland	1–0	Germany

=== Group 2 ===
Teams	Pld	W	D	L	GF	GA	GD	Pts
France	4	3	1	0	14	1	+13	7
Iceland	4	2	1	1	15	3	+12	5
Luxembourg	4	0	0	4	1	26	–25	0

Luxembourg	0–4	France
Iceland	0–1	France
Iceland	9–0	Luxembourg
Luxembourg	1–5	Iceland
France	1–1	Iceland
France	8–0	Luxembourg

=== Group 3 ===
Teams	Pld	W	D	L	GF	GA	GD	Pts
Netherlands	4	3	0	1	8	5	+3	6
Sweden	4	2	1	1	3	1	+2	5
Republic of Ireland	4	0	1	3	3	8	–5	1

Sweden	1–0	Republic of Ireland
Republic of Ireland	2–3	Netherlands
Netherlands	4–1	Republic of Ireland
Sweden	2–0	Netherlands
Republic of Ireland	0–0	Sweden
Netherlands	1–0	Sweden

=== Group 4 ===
Team 1	Agg.	Team 2	1st leg	2nd leg
Spain	9–3	Finland	4–0	5–3

=== Group 5 ===
All matches were played in Malta.

Teams	Pld	W	D	L	GF	GA	GD	Pts
Russia	2	2	0	0	4	0	+4	4
Malta	2	0	1	1	1	2	–1	1
Estonia	2	0	1	1	1	4	–3	1

Malta	0–1	Russia
Russia	3–0	Estonia
Estonia	1–1	Malta

=== Group 6 ===
All matches were played in Turkey.

Teams	Pld	W	D	L	GF	GA	GD	Pts
Turkey	2	1	1	0	9	2	+7	3
Portugal	2	1	1	0	4	3	+1	3
Croatia	2	0	0	2	1	9	–8	0

Croatia	0–7	Turkey
Portugal	2–1	Croatia
Turkey	2–2	Portugal

=== Group 7 ===
All matches were played in Bulgaria.

Teams	Pld	W	D	L	GF	GA	GD	Pts
Bulgaria	2	2	0	0	7	3	+4	4
Moldova	2	1	0	1	6	7	–1	2
Belarus	2	0	0	2	4	7	–3	0

Belarus	3–4	Moldova
Bulgaria	3–1	Belarus
Moldova	2–4	Bulgaria

=== Group 8 ===
All matches were played in Ukraine.

Teams	Pld	W	D	L	GF	GA	GD	Pts
Ukraine	2	2	0	0	7	1	+6	4
Georgia	2	1	0	1	3	2	+1	2
Armenia	2	0	0	2	1	8	–7	0

Ukraine	5–1	Armenia
Armenia	0–3	Georgia
Georgia	0–2	Ukraine

=== Group 9 ===
All matches were played in Slovakia.

Teams	Pld	W	D	L	GF	GA	GD	Pts
Slovakia	2	2	0	0	14	1	+13	4
Cyprus	2	1	0	1	3	7	–4	2
Azerbaijan	2	0	0	2	0	9	–9	0

Cyprus	1–7	Slovakia
Azerbaijan	0–2	Cyprus
Slovakia	7–0	Azerbaijan

=== Group 10 ===
All matches were played in Austria.

Teams	Pld	W	D	L	GF	GA	GD	Pts
Romania	2	1	1	0	4	2	+2	3
Belgium	2	1	1	0	5	4	+1	3
Austria	2	0	0	2	2	5	–3	0

Austria	0–2	Romania
Austria	2–3	Belgium
Romania	2–2	Belgium

=== Group 11 ===
Teams	Pld	W	D	L	GF	GA	GD	Pts
Hungary	4	3	1	0	16	2	+14	7
Switzerland	4	2	1	1	8	4	+4	5
San Marino	4	0	0	4	1	19	–18	0

Hungary	3–0	Switzerland
San Marino	1–8	Hungary
Switzerland	1–1	Hungary
Switzerland	6–0	San Marino
Hungary	4–0	San Marino
San Marino	0–1	Switzerland

=== Group 12 ===
Teams	Pld	W	D	L	GF	GA	GD	Pts
Denmark	4	4	0	0	19	4	+15	8
Czech Republic	4	1	0	3	6	9	–3	2
Poland	4	1	0	3	5	17	–12	2

Poland	2–0	Czech Republic
Czech Republic	2–3	Denmark
Czech Republic	4–1	Poland
Denmark	3–0	Czech Republic
Poland	2–3	Denmark
Denmark	10–0	Poland

=== Group 13 ===
All matches were played in Italy.

Teams	Pld	W	D	L	GF	GA	GD	Pts
Italy	2	2	0	0	6	2	+4	4
Wales	2	1	0	1	5	5	0	2
Lithuania	2	0	0	2	2	6	–4	0

Italy	2–1	Lithuania
Lithuania	1–4	Wales
Wales	1–4	Italy

=== Group 14 ===
All matches were played in Norway.

Teams	Pld	W	D	L	GF	GA	GD	Pts
Norway	2	2	0	0	4	2	+2	4
Scotland	2	1	0	1	2	2	0	2
Israel	2	0	0	2	1	3	–2	0

Norway	2–1	Israel
Israel	0–1	Scotland
Scotland	1–2	Norway

=== Group 15 ===
All matches were played in England

Teams	Pld	W	D	L	GF	GA	GD	Pts
England	2	1	1	0	3	0	+3	3
Slovenia	2	1	0	1	2	3	–1	2
Latvia	2	0	1	1	0	2	–2	1

England	3–0	Slovenia
Slovenia	2–0	Latvia
Latvia	0–0	England

== Round 2 ==
=== Group 1 ===
All matches were played in Spain.

Teams	Pld	W	D	L	GF	GA	GD	Pts
Spain	2	1	1	0	4	3	+1	3
Ukraine	2	1	0	1	3	3	0	2
Romania	2	0	1	1	3	4	–1	1

Romania	2–2	Spain
Ukraine	2–1	Romania
Spain	2–1	Ukraine

=== Groups 2-7 ===
Team 1	Agg.	Team 2	1st leg	2nd leg
Northern Ireland	0–6	Norway	0–5	0–1
Turkey	4–1	Russia	3–1	1–0
Denmark	4–7	Slovakia	1–3	3–4
Hungary	2–1	England	0–1	2–0
France	2–3	Netherlands	0–1	2–2
Bulgaria	1–2	Italy	1–1	0–1

== See also ==
- 1995 UEFA European Under-18 Championship
