= Bosnia and Herzegovina national under-19 football team =

Bosnia and Herzegovina U-19
- Nickname(s): Zmajevi (Dragons); Zlatni Ljiljani (Golden Lilies)
- Association: Football Association of Bosnia and Herzegovina
- Confederation: UEFA (Europe)
- Head coach: Dubravko Orlović
- FIFA code: BIH
First colours	Second colours

The Bosnia and Herzegovina national under-19 football team is made up by players who are 19 years old or younger and represents Bosnia and Herzegovina in international football matches at this age level.

== Competitive record ==
=== UEFA European U19 Championship ===
UEFA European U19 Championship Record									Qualification Record						
Year	Round	Pld	W	D	L	GF	GA	GD	Pld	W	D	L	GF	GA	GD
(Norway) 2002	Did not qualify								3	1	1	1	2	2	0
(Liechtenstein) 2003	Did not qualify								3	0	1	2	5	11	−6
(Switzerland) 2004	Did not qualify								3	0	0	3	4	9	−5
(Northern Ireland) 2005	Did not qualify								3	0	0	3	1	7	−6
(Poland) 2006	Did not qualify								3	0	0	3	0	9	−9
(Austria) 2007	Did not qualify								3	0	0	3	1	14	−13
(Czech Republic) 2008	Did not qualify								3	0	1	2	3	11	−8
(Ukraine) 2009	Did not qualify								6	1	2	3	4	9	−5
(France) 2010	Did not qualify								6	2	0	4	4	14	−10
(Romania) 2011	Did not qualify								3	0	2	1	2	3	−1
(Estonia) 2012	Did not qualify								6	3	0	3	8	9	−1
(Lithuania) 2013	Did not qualify								6	2	0	4	11	15	−4
(Hungary) 2014	Did not qualify								3	0	2	1	2	5	−2
(Greece) 2015	Did not qualify								6	2	3	1	9	3	+6
(Germany) 2016	Did not qualify								3	1	0	2	3	5	−2
(Georgia (country)) 2017	Did not qualify								6	3	1	2	10	8	+2
(Finland) 2018	Did not qualify								6	2	0	4	7	11	−4
(Armenia) 2019	Did not qualify								3	1	0	2	3	10	−7
(Northern Ireland) 2020	Cancelled								3	1	1	1	2	4	−2
(Romania) 2021	Cancelled								0	0	0	0	0	0	0
(Slovakia) 2022	Did not qualify								6	4	1	1	12	5	+7
(Malta) 2023	Did not qualify								3	0	0	3	4	8	−4
(Northern Ireland) 2024	Did not qualify								3	1	1	1	1	3	−2
(Romania) 2025	Did not qualify								3	0	0	3	4	11	−7
(Wales) 2026	Did not qualify								3	0	1	2	1	3	−2
(Czech Republic) 2027	To be played								0	0	0	0	0	0	0
Total	0/23	0	0	0	0	0	0	0	95	24	17	56	99	191	−92

=== Mediterranean Games ===
Mediterranean Games Record
Year	Round	Position	Pld	W	D	L	GF	GA	GD
(Turkey) 2013	Group Stage	5th	5	2	1	2	11	12	−1
(Spain) 2018	Group Stage	8th	3	0	0	3	8	-5	−3

== 2027 UEFA European U-19 Championship Qualifiers ==
=== Group A4 ===
Pos	Team	Pld	W	D	L	GF	GA	GD	Pts	Transfer or relegation
1	Austria (H)	3	2	1	0	8	3	+5	7	Transferred to Round 2 League A
2	Israel	3	1	1	1	5	4	+1	4	Transferred to Round 2 League A
3	Germany	3	1	1	1	5	6	−1	4	Transferred to Round 2 League A
4	Bosnia and Herzegovina	3	0	1	2	2	7	−5	1	Relegated to Round 2 League B

Source: UEFA
Rules for classification: Qualification tiebreakers

25 March 2026	Germany	2–1	Bosnia and Herzegovina	Lindabrunn, Enzesfeld-Lindabrunn
13:00	Staff 5'; Gashi 56'	Report	Nišić 37'	Referee: Dominik Starý (Czechia)

28 March 2026	Austria	4–0	Bosnia and Herzegovina	Stadion Wiener Neustadt, Wiener Neustadt
18:00	Krapf 9'; Deshishku 13' (pen.); Wölbl 68'; Delić 88'	Report		Referee: Dominik Starý (Czechia)

31 March 2026	Bosnia and Herzegovina	1–1	Israel	Lindabrunn, Enzesfeld-Lindabrunn
15:00	Nišić 11'	Report	Levy 43'	Referee: Granit Maqedonci (Sweden)

== Personnel ==
=== Current technical staff ===
Position	Name
Head coach	(Bosnia and Herzegovina) Dubravko Orlović
Coach	(Bosnia and Herzegovina) Zoran Dragišić
Coach	(Bosnia and Herzegovina) Muhamed Berberović
Goalkeeping coach	(Bosnia and Herzegovina) Dominik Tolo

=== Coaching history ===
Dates	Name
2023–present	(Bosnia and Herzegovina) Dubravko Orlović
2022–2023	(Croatia) Mario Ivanković
2021–2022	(Bosnia and Herzegovina) Ivica Barbarić
2018–2021	(Bosnia and Herzegovina) Slaven Musa
2011–2018	(Bosnia and Herzegovina) Toni Karačić
2008–2011	(Bosnia and Herzegovina) Zoran Bubalo
2004–2007	(Bosnia and Herzegovina) Nikola Nikić
2003	(Bosnia and Herzegovina) Denijal Pirić
2002	(Bosnia and Herzegovina) Nikola Nikić
2001	(Bosnia and Herzegovina) Sejfudin Tica
2000–2001	(Bosnia and Herzegovina) Amir Alagić
1996–1999	(Bosnia and Herzegovina) Senad Kreso

== Players ==
=== Current squad ===
The following players were called up for 2027 UEFA European Under-19 Championship qualification matches against Germany, Austria and Israel on 25, 28 and 31 March 2026; respectively.

Caps and goals correct as of 31 March 2026, after the game against Israel.

No.	Pos.	Player	Date of birth (age)	Caps	Goals	Club
1	GK	Tarik Banjić	2 February 2008 (age 18)	5	0	(Football Association of Serbia) Partizan
12	GK	Haris Mujanić	7 May 2008 (age 18)	4	0	(Football Association of Slovenia) Koper
2	DF	Nikola Antešević	5 January 2008 (age 18)	4	0	(Football Association of Bosnia and Herzegovina) Borac Banja Luka
3	DF	Ivan Jelić	28 February 2008 (age 18)	8	0	(Football Association of Bosnia and Herzegovina) Široki Brijeg
5	DF	Daris Dizdarević	21 May 2008 (age 18)	6	0	(Football Association of Bosnia and Herzegovina) Sarajevo
6	DF	Nikša Blagojević	29 May 2008 (age 18)	3	0	(Football Association of Serbia) Grafičar Beograd
7	DF	Božidar Dimitrić	11 March 2008 (age 18)	7	1	(Football Association of Bosnia and Herzegovina) Radnik Bijeljina
16	DF	Ajdin Raščić	18 September 2008 (age 18)	5	0	(Football Association of Bosnia and Herzegovina) Željezničar
18	DF	Benjamin Zulović	12 April 2008 (age 18)	1	0	(French Football Federation) Paris Saint-Germain
19	DF	Tarik Čirak	8 March 2009 (age 17)	1	0	(German Football Association) SpVgg Unterhaching
20	DF	Luka Vulin	7 January 2009 (age 17)	5	0	(German Football Association) Union Berlin
4	MF	Darko Savić	3 June 2008 (age 18)	9	1	(Football Association of Bosnia and Herzegovina) Sloga Doboj
8	MF	Kenan Vrban	19 September 2008 (age 18)	6	0	(Football Association of Bosnia and Herzegovina) Sarajevo
10	MF	Rijad Telalović	28 September 2008 (age 18)	9	1	(Football Association of Bosnia and Herzegovina) Sarajevo
13	MF	Anan Baltić	12 May 2008 (age 18)	3	0	(Football Association of Bosnia and Herzegovina) Travnik
15	MF	Leon Oroz	31 March 2008 (age 18)	4	0	(Croatian Football Federation) Dinamo Zagreb
17	MF	Eldar Dragović	21 March 2008 (age 18)	2	0	(Football Association of Bosnia and Herzegovina) Željezničar
	MF	Danilo Karanović	15 June 2008 (age 18)	1	0	(Football Association of Serbia) Teleoptik
9	FW	Said Nišić	5 May 2008 (age 18)	6	2	(Austrian Football Association) Red Bull Salzburg
11	FW	Anes H. Mehmedović	10 August 2008 (age 18)	7	0	(Football Association of Bosnia and Herzegovina) Sarajevo
14	FW	Ante Šunjić	14 November 2008 (age 17)	5	1	(Football Association of Bosnia and Herzegovina) Zrinjski Mostar

=== Recent call-ups ===
The following players have also been recently called up for the team and still remain eligible for selection.

Pos.	Player	Date of birth (age)	Caps	Goals	Club	Latest call-up
GK	Patrik Kovač	17 September 2008 (age 18)	1	0	(Bosnia and Herzegovina) Posušje	v. Montenegro, 19 February 2026
GK	Dino Kaiser	9 February 2007 (age 19)	3	0	(England) Margate	v. Moldova, 18 November 2025
DF	Jovan Ćulum	5 January 2008 (age 18)	1	0	(Serbia) Radnički Niš	v. Montenegro, 19 February 2026
DF	David Mišović	22 February 2008 (age 18)	1	0	(Bosnia and Herzegovina) Famos Vojkovići	v. Montenegro, 19 February 2026
DF	Luka Soldo	3 July 2008 (age 18)	1	0	(Belgium) Kortrijk	v. Montenegro, 19 February 2026
DF	Lovre Šimić	2 October 2008 (age 18)	1	0	(Croatia) Sesvete	v. Montenegro, 19 February 2026
DF	Uroš Milošević	18 August 2008 (age 18)	0	0	(Serbia) Partizan	v. Montenegro, 19 February 2026
DF	Jusuf Terzić	27 March 2007 (age 19)	10	0	(Bosnia and Herzegovina) Borac Banja Luka	v. Moldova, 18 November 2025
DF	Hamza Redžić	9 June 2007 (age 19)	8	0	(Bosnia and Herzegovina) Sarajevo	v. Moldova, 18 November 2025
DF	Amel Avdić	7 April 2007 (age 19)	5	0	(Austria) Bischofshofen	v. Moldova, 18 November 2025
DF	Miljan Pantić	12 June 2007 (age 19)	3	0	(Slovenia) Olimpija Ljubljana	v. Moldova, 18 November 2025
DF	Adem Mustafić	3 April 2008 (age 18)	2	0	Austria Klagenfurt	v. Moldova, 18 November 2025
MF	Armin Spahić	8 January 2008 (age 18)	6	1	(Germany) Borussia Mönchengladbach	v. Montenegro, 19 February 2026
MF	Benjamin Kadirić	29 March 2008 (age 18)	2	0	(Switzerland) St. Gallen	v. Montenegro, 19 February 2026
MF	Admir Gojak	19 August 2007 (age 19)	8	1	(Bosnia and Herzegovina) Željezničar	v. Moldova, 18 November 2025
MF	Pavle Šarac	28 May 2007 (age 19)	4	0	(Bosnia and Herzegovina) Široki Brijeg	v. Moldova, 18 November 2025
FW	Leon Bogović	1 June 2008 (age 18)	1	0	(Croatia) Rijeka	v. Montenegro, 19 February 2026
FW	Antonio Arapović	24 April 2007 (age 19)	6	0	(Bosnia and Herzegovina) Zrinjski Mostar	v. Moldova, 18 November 2025
FW	Din Ramić	28 December 2008 (age 17)	6	0	(Switzerland) Zürich	v. Moldova, 18 November 2025
FW	Amar Cerić	3 November 2007 (age 19)	5	0	(Bosnia and Herzegovina) Sarajevo	v. Moldova, 18 November 2025
FW	Ivan Kraljević	13 April 2007 (age 19)	5	0	(Bosnia and Herzegovina) Široki Brijeg	v. Moldova, 18 November 2025
FW	Dragan Pejić	21 August 2007 (age 19)	1	0	(Bosnia and Herzegovina) Borac Banja Luka	v. Moldova, 18 November 2025
FW	Mehmed Šehić	21 May 2007 (age 19)	1	0	(Bosnia and Herzegovina) Čelik Zenica	v. Moldova, 18 November 2025
Notes: ^{PRE} = Preliminary squad / standby

== See also ==
- European Under-19 Football Championship
- Bosnia and Herzegovina men's national football team
- Bosnia and Herzegovina national under-21 football team
- Bosnia and Herzegovina national under-18 football team
- Bosnia and Herzegovina national under-17 football team
- Bosnia and Herzegovina national under-15 football team
- Bosnia and Herzegovina women's national football team
- Bosnia and Herzegovina women's national under-19 football team
- Bosnia and Herzegovina women's national under-17 football team
