= 2008 UEFA European Under-19 Championship elite qualification =

UEFA U-19 Championship 2008 (Elite Round) is the second round of qualifications for the Final Tournament of UEFA U-19 Championship 2008. The winners of each group join hosts Czech Republic at the Final Tournament.

== Group 1 ==
| Team | Pld | W | D | L | GF | GA | GD | Pts |
|---|---|---|---|---|---|---|---|---|
| England | 3 | 2 | 1 | 0 | 3 | 0 | +3 | 7 |
| Belarus (H) | 3 | 1 | 1 | 1 | 1 | 4 | −3 | 4 |
| Poland | 3 | 1 | 0 | 2 | 1 | 3 | −2 | 3 |
| Serbia | 3 | 1 | 0 | 2 | 4 | 2 | +2 | 3 |

(H) Hosts
26 May 2008
12:30 CET

| England | 2 – 0 | Poland |
|---|---|---|
| Sears 28', 87' (pen.) | Report |

City Stadium, Borisov
Referee: Lars Christoffersen (Denmark)
26 May 2008
15:30 CET

| Belarus | 0 – 4 | Serbia |
|---|---|---|
| | Report | Vuković 1', 41'; Milojević 57'; Gulan 75' |

Traktor Stadium, Minsk
Referee: Radek Příhoda (Czech Republic)

28 May 2008
12:30 CET

| England | 1 – 0 | Serbia |
|---|---|---|
| Henry 56' | Report |

City Stadium, Borisov
Referee: Lars Christoffersen (Denmark)
28 May 2008
15:30 CET

| Poland | 0 – 1 | Belarus |
|---|---|---|
| | Report | Talkanitsa 77' |

Traktor Stadium, Minsk
Referee: Hüseyin Göçek (Turkey)

31 May 2008
15:00 CET

| Belarus | 0 – 0 | England |
|---|---|---|
| | Report |

Traktor Stadium, Minsk
Referee: Radek Příhoda (Czech Republic)
31 May 2008
15:00 CET

| Serbia | 0 – 1 | Poland |
|---|---|---|
| | Report | Lukasz 66' |

City Stadium, Borisov
Referee: Hüseyin Göçek (Turkey)

== Group 2 ==
| Team | Pld | W | D | L | GF | GA | GD | Pts |
|---|---|---|---|---|---|---|---|---|
| Hungary (H) | 3 | 2 | 1 | 0 | 5 | 3 | +2 | 7 |
| Portugal | 3 | 2 | 0 | 1 | 8 | 2 | +6 | 6 |
| Cyprus | 3 | 1 | 0 | 2 | 2 | 7 | −5 | 3 |
| Lithuania | 3 | 0 | 1 | 2 | 3 | 6 | −3 | 1 |

(H) Hosts
19 May 2008
16:30 CET

| Portugal | 5 – 0 | Cyprus |
|---|---|---|
| Ribeiro 5'; Oliveira 7'; Vítor 15'; Carvalhas 33'; Kyriakou 90' (o.g.) | Report |

Városi, Tatabánya
Referee: Dimitar Meckarovski (Macedonia)

19 May 2008
18:00 CET

| Hungary | 2 – 2 | Lithuania |
|---|---|---|
| Gosztonyi 33'; Présinger 52' | Report | Papsys 66', 72' |

Sóstói, Székesfehérvár
Referee: Babak Rafati (Germany)

21 May 2008
16:30 CET

| Lithuania | 1 – 3 | Portugal |
|---|---|---|
| Papsys 73' | Report | Vítor 34'; Lima 85'; Oliveira 90+4' |

Városi, Tatabánya
Referee: Dimitar Meckarovski (Macedonia)

21 May 2008
18:00 CET

| Hungary | 2 – 1 | Cyprus |
|---|---|---|
| Németh 37' (pen.), 57' | Report | Efrem 78' |

Sóstói, Székesfehérvár
Referee: Ignasi Villamayor Rozados (Andorra)

24 May 2008
16:30 CET

| Portugal | 0 – 1 | Hungary |
|---|---|---|
| | Report | Németh 62' |

Sóstói, Székesfehérvár
Referee: Babak Rafati (Germany)

24 May 2008
16:30 CET

| Cyprus | 1 – 0 | Lithuania |
|---|---|---|
| Efrem 70' (pen.) | Report |

Városi, Tatabánya
Referee: Ignasi Villamayor Rozados (Andorra)

== Group 3 ==
| Team | Pld | W | D | L | GF | GA | GD | Pts |
|---|---|---|---|---|---|---|---|---|
| Bulgaria | 3 | 3 | 0 | 0 | 5 | 1 | +4 | 9 |
| Iceland | 3 | 2 | 0 | 1 | 5 | 4 | +1 | 6 |
| Norway (H) | 3 | 1 | 0 | 2 | 4 | 5 | −1 | 3 |
| Israel | 3 | 0 | 0 | 3 | 0 | 4 | −4 | 0 |

(H) Hosts
27 April 2008
14:00 CET

| Israel | 0 – 1 | Bulgaria |
|---|---|---|
| | Report | Cvetanov 11' |

Lisleby Stadium, Fredrikstad

27 April 2008
17:00 CET

| Norway | 2 – 3 | Iceland |
|---|---|---|
| | Report |

Melløs Stadion, Moss

29 April 2008
18:00 CET

| Norway | 0 – 2 | Bulgaria |
|---|---|---|
| | Report | Aleksandrov 28' (pen.); Mustafa 39' |

Lisleby Stadium, Fredrikstad
Referee: Richard Liesveld (Netherlands)

29 April 2008
18:00 CET

| Iceland | 1 – 0 | Israel |
|---|---|---|
| Sigurðsson 7' | Report |

Sarpsborg stadion, Sarpsborg
Referee: Boško Jovanetic (Serbia)

2 May 2008
18:00 CET

| Israel | 0 – 2 | Norway |
|---|---|---|
| | Report | Orry Larsen 8', 42' |

Sarpsborg stadion, Sarpsborg
Referee: Richard Liesveld (Netherlands)

2 May 2008
18:00 CET

| Bulgaria | 2 – 1 | Iceland |
|---|---|---|
| Cvetanov 30'; Zehirov 90+2' | Report | Sigurðsson 90+4' (pen.) |

Råde Idrettspark, Råde
Referee: Victor Shvetsov (Ukraine)

== Group 4 ==
| Team | Pld | W | D | L | GF | GA | GD | Pts |
|---|---|---|---|---|---|---|---|---|
| Germany | 3 | 2 | 1 | 0 | 9 | 4 | +5 | 7 |
| Croatia | 3 | 1 | 2 | 0 | 5 | 3 | +2 | 5 |
| Slovakia (H) | 3 | 0 | 2 | 1 | 5 | 8 | −3 | 2 |
| Albania | 3 | 0 | 1 | 2 | 2 | 6 | −4 | 1 |

(H) Hosts
22 May 2008
11:00 CET

| Slovakia | 1 – 1 | Croatia |
|---|---|---|
| Stoch 12' | Report | Poljak 41' |

SFM Senec, Veľký Biel
Referee: Calum Murray (Scotland)

22 May 2008
11:00 CET

| Germany | 2 – 0 | Albania |
|---|---|---|
| Aydilek 6'; Diekmeier 36' | Report |

NTC Stadion, Senec
Referee: Michail Koukoulakis (Greece)

24 May 2008
11:00 CET

| Slovakia | 2 – 2 | Albania |
|---|---|---|
| Jakubjak 27'; Sylvestr 41' | Report | Metani 8'; Mustafaj 14' |

NTC Stadion, Senec
Referee: Michail Koukoulakis (Greece)

24 May 2008
11:00 CET

| Croatia | 2 – 2 | Germany |
|---|---|---|
| Prijić 51' (pen.); Smrekar 59' | Report | Gebhart 64', 86' (pen.) |

Štadión pod Zoborom, Nitra
Referee: Carlos Miguel Taborda Xistra (Portugal)

27 May 2008
11:00 CET

| Germany | 5 – 2 | Slovakia |
|---|---|---|
| Naki 8'; Gebhart 16' (pen.); Fischer 43'; Risse 71' (pen.); S. Bender 84' | Report | Diekmeier 4' (o.g.); Šupák 55' |

Štadión pod Zoborom, Nitra
Referee: Carlos Miguel Taborda Xistra (Portugal)

27 May 2008
11:00 CET

| Albania | 0 – 2 | Croatia |
|---|---|---|
| | Report | Prijić 10'; Maloca 64' |

NTC Stadion, Senec
Referee: Calum Murray (Scotland)

== Group 5 ==
| Team | Pld | W | D | L | GF | GA | GD | Pts |
|---|---|---|---|---|---|---|---|---|
| Greece (H) | 3 | 2 | 0 | 1 | 6 | 4 | +2 | 6 |
| Russia | 3 | 1 | 1 | 1 | 5 | 6 | −1 | 4 |
| Moldova | 3 | 1 | 1 | 1 | 3 | 3 | 0 | 4 |
| Netherlands | 3 | 0 | 2 | 1 | 3 | 4 | −1 | 2 |

(H) Hosts
24 May 2008
16:00 CET

| Russia | 2 – 2 | Netherlands |
|---|---|---|
| Maguire 5' (o.g.); Mochalin 46' | Report | Wijnaldum 18'; Fer 71' |

Municipal Stadium, Argos Orestik
Referee: Gianluca Rocchi (Italy)

24 May 2008
18:00 CET

| Greece | 1 – 2 | Moldova |
|---|---|---|
| Matsoukas 28' | Report | Catan 17'; Andronic 80' |

Municipal Stadium, Kastoria
Referee: Said Ennjimi (France)

26 May 2008
16:00 CET

| Russia | 2 – 1 | Moldova |
|---|---|---|
| Ryzhov 21'; Pesegov 50' | Report | Catan 34' |

Municipal Stadium, Argos Orestik
Referee: Jovan Kaludjerovic (Montenegro)

26 May 2008
18:00 CET

| Greece | 2 – 1 | Netherlands |
|---|---|---|
| Matsoukas 71'; Ninis 90+1' (pen.) | Report | Zeefuik 87' |

Municipal Stadium, Kastoria
Referee: Gianluca Rocchi (Italy)

29 May 2008
16:00 CET

| Greece | 3 – 1 | Russia |
|---|---|---|
| Pavlis 17', 63'; Papadopoulos 54' | Report | Gorbatenko 21' |

Municipal Stadium, Kastoria
Referee: Said Ennjimi (France)

29 May 2008
16:00 CET

| Moldova | 0 – 0 | Netherlands |
|---|---|---|
| | Report |

Municipal Stadium, Argos Orestik
Referee: Jovan Kaludjerovic (Montenegro)

== Group 6 ==
| Team | Pld | W | D | L | GF | GA | GD | Pts |
|---|---|---|---|---|---|---|---|---|
| Italy | 3 | 3 | 0 | 0 | 6 | 0 | +6 | 9 |
| France | 3 | 2 | 0 | 1 | 5 | 5 | 0 | 6 |
| Switzerland (H) | 3 | 1 | 0 | 2 | 6 | 6 | 0 | 3 |
| Sweden | 3 | 0 | 0 | 3 | 2 | 8 | −6 | 0 |

(H) Hosts
26 May 2008
18:30 CET

| Italy | 2 – 0 | Sweden |
|---|---|---|
| Paloschi 42'; Forestieri 76' | Report |

Stade d'Octodure, Martigny
Referee: Carlos Velasco Carballo (Spain)

26 May 2008
18:30 CET

| France | 3 – 2 | Switzerland |
|---|---|---|
| Malonga 31', 63'; Robert 80' | Report | Frei 61', 90' (pen.) |

Stade de Saint-Germain, Savièse
Referee: Jérôme Efong Nzolo (Belgium)

28 May 2008
18:30 CET

| Italy | 2 – 0 | Switzerland |
|---|---|---|
| Paloschi 53'; Okaka 78' | Report |

Stade Tourbillon, Sion
Referee: Jérôme Efong Nzolo (Belgium)

28 May 2008
18:30 CET

| Sweden | 1 – 2 | France |
|---|---|---|
| Fagerberg 82' | Report | Robert 3'; Obertan 32' |

Stade de Saint-Germain, Savièse
Referee: Anastassios Kakos (Greece)

31 May 2008
17:30 CET

| France | 0 – 2 | Italy |
|---|---|---|
| | Report | Mazzarani 65', 90+3' |

Stade Tourbillon, Sion
Referee: Carlos Velasco Carballo (Spain)

31 May 2008
17:30 CET

| Switzerland | 4 – 1 | Sweden |
|---|---|---|
| Frei 64', 90+3'; Gavranović 68'; Stocker 73' | Report | Ekdal 55' |

Stade d'Octodure, Martigny
Referee: Anastassios Kakos (Greece)

== Group 7 ==
| Team | Pld | W | D | L | GF | GA | GD | Pts |
|---|---|---|---|---|---|---|---|---|
| Spain | 3 | 3 | 0 | 0 | 10 | 3 | +7 | 9 |
| Ukraine | 3 | 2 | 0 | 1 | 5 | 3 | +2 | 6 |
| Turkey | 3 | 1 | 0 | 2 | 2 | 7 | −5 | 3 |
| Armenia (H) | 3 | 0 | 0 | 3 | 3 | 7 | −4 | 0 |

(H) Hosts
22 May 2008
11:00 CET

| Turkey | 2 – 1 | Armenia |
|---|---|---|
| Yıldırım 10'; Şentürk 61' | Report | Voskanyan 43' |

Kotayk Stadium, Abovyan
Referee: Sándor Szabó (Hungary)

22 May 2008
14:00 CET

| Ukraine | 1 – 3 | Spain |
|---|---|---|
| Iarmolenko 18' (pen.) | Report | Nsue 22', 90+1'; Aarón 65' |

Kasaghi Marzik Stadium, Ashtarak
Referee: Steve Tanner (England)

24 May 2008
11:00 CET

| Ukraine | 1 – 0 | Armenia |
|---|---|---|
| Antonyan 23' (o.g.) | Report |

Kotayk Stadium, Abovyan
Referee: Alexandru Deaconu (Romania)

24 May 2008
14:00 CET

| Spain | 3 – 0 | Turkey |
|---|---|---|
| Camacho 47', 83'; Bolado 62' | Report |

Kasaghi Marzik Stadium, Ashtarak
Referee: Steve Tanner (England)

27 May 2008
12:00 CET

| Turkey | 0 – 3 | Ukraine |
|---|---|---|
| | Report | Kravets 17', 76'; Dovgyy 41' |

Kasaghi Marzik Stadium, Ashtarak
Referee: Sándor Szabó (Hungary)

27 May 2008
12:00 CET

| Armenia | 2 – 4 | Spain |
|---|---|---|
| Voskanyan 21'; Gyozalyan 45+1' | Report | Bolado 45+1'; Antonyan 50' (o.g.); Mérida 84', 87' |

Kotayk Stadium, Abovyan
Referee: Alexandru Deaconu (Romania)

== See also ==
- 2008 UEFA European Under-19 Championship
- 2008 UEFA European Under-19 Championship qualification
