= Dorin Popovici =

Moldovan footballer

Personal information
- Full name: Dorin Popovici
- Date of birth: 1 July 1996 (age 30)
- Place of birth: Moldova
- Position: Midfielder

Team information
- Current team: CF Ungheni

Senior career*
Years	Team	Apps	(Gls)
2013–2016	FC Milsami Orhei	14	(0)
2016	FC Petrocub Hîncești	10	(0)
2016	Billericay Town	3	(0)
2016–2017	FC Petrocub Hîncești	8	(2)
2017–	CF Ungheni	6	(0)

International career
2014–	Moldova U19	3	(0)
- * Club domestic league appearances and goals as of 4 April 2017 (UTC)

Dorin Popovici (born 1 July 1996) is a Moldovan footballer who currently plays as a midfielder for CF Ungheni.

== Career ==
In March 2016 left FC Milsami Orhei and signed with League rival FC Petrocub Hîncești. He played 10 League matches in the second half of the 2015–16 season for FC Petrocub Hîncești and signed in July 2016 with English non-League club Billericay Town.
