= Simion Bulgaru =

Moldovan footballer (born 1985)

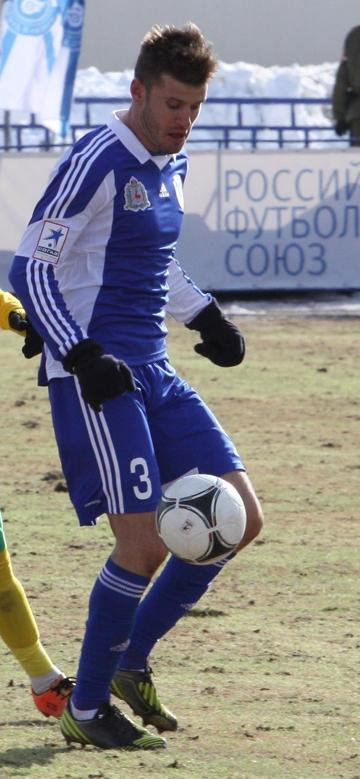
- Bulgaru with Volga Nizhny Novgorod in 2013

Personal information
- Date of birth: 26 May 1985 (age 41)
- Place of birth: Chișinău, Moldavian SSR, Soviet Union
- Height: 1.86 m (6 ft 1 in)
- Position: Defender

Team information
- Current team: Moldova U19 (head coach)

Youth career
- 2000–2002: Zimbru Chișinău

Senior career*
Years	Team	Apps	(Gls)
2003–2006	Zimbru Chișinău	70	(4)
2007–2008	Sheriff Tiraspol	17	(1)
2008–2010	Viborg	35	(1)
2010–2012	Alania Vladikavkaz	64	(1)
2013–2014	Volga Nizhny Novgorod	21	(0)
2014–2015	Irtysh Pavlodar	12	(0)
2015–2017	Dacia Chișinău	47	(1)
Total		266	(8)

International career^{‡}
2007–2013	Moldova	23	(1)

Managerial career
- 2019–2020: Zimbru Chișinău (assistant)
- 2020: Codru Lozova
- 2020: Zimbru Chișinău (assistant)
- 2020–2021: Zimbru Chișinău (interim)
- 2021–2025: Moldova U21 (assistant)
- 2025: Moldova U18
- 2025–: Moldova U19
- * Club domestic league appearances and goals ‡ National team caps and goals as of 12 February 2026

Simion Bulgaru (born 26 May 1985) is a Moldovan football manager and former player. He is currently the head coach of the Moldova under-19 national team.

== Club career ==
Bulgaru began his career with Zimbru Chișinău. After three years with the senior side, he joined to Sheriff Tiraspol in January 2007.

After one year with the club in January 2008 transferred from Sheriff Tiraspol to Viborg in the Danish Superliga. After two and a half years in Denmark, he was sold to Alania Vladikavkaz from Russia.

On 27 February 2013, he signed a one-and-a-half-year contract with Volga Nizhny Novgorod.

== International career ==
Bulgaru was a member of the Moldova national team from 2007 to 2013.

== Managerial career ==
=== Zimbru Chișinău ===
On 10 June 2020, Bulgaru was announced as the new assistant coach of Zimbru Chișinău, with Vlad Goian being announced as head coach.

On 16 October 2020, Bulgaru became interim head coach after Vlad Goian left the role. Bulgaru resigned from his position and left the club in January 2021.

== Career statistics ==
Scores and results list Moldova's goal tally first, score column indicates score after each Bulgaru goal.

List of international goals scored by Simion Bulgaru
No.	Date	Venue	Opponent	Score	Result	Competition
1	29 May 2010	Sportzentrum Anif, Anif, Austria	United Arab Emirates	2–2	2–3	Friendly
