= Jiří Januška =

Czech footballer

Personal information
- Date of birth: 11 October 1997 (age 29)
- Place of birth: Czech Republic
- Height: 1.78 m (5 ft 10 in)
- Position: Midfielder

Team information
- Current team: Sokol Hostouň
- Number: 10

Youth career
- –2015: Příbram

Senior career*
Years	Team	Apps	(Gls)
2015–2022	Příbram	33	(2)
2018	→ Písek (loan)	13	(5)
2019	→ Vítkovice (loan)	14	(3)
2019–2020	→ Vlašim (loan)	13	(4)
2020	→ Slavoj Vyšehrad (loan)	9	(0)
2022–	Sokol Hostouň	26	(8)

International career
2013	Czech Republic U-16	11	(1)
2013–2014	Czech Republic U-17	17	(1)
2014–2015	Czech Republic U-18	7	(0)
2014	Czech Republic U-19	6	(1)
- * Club domestic league appearances and goals as of 20:10, 25 January 2023 (UTC)

Jiří Januška (born 11 October 1997) is a Czech football player. He plays for Sokol Hostouň.

== Club career ==
He made his Czech First League debut for 1. FK Příbram on 13 September 2015 in a game against FC Viktoria Plzeň.
