= Lucas Cueto =

German footballer (born 1996)

Personal information
- Date of birth: 24 March 1996 (age 30)
- Place of birth: Cologne, Germany
- Height: 1.77 m (5 ft 10 in)
- Position: Forward

Team information
- Current team: Sportfreunde Siegen
- Number: 10

Youth career
- –2004: SV Lövenich/Widdersdorf
- 2004–2011: Bayer Leverkusen
- 2011–2012: West Ham United
- 2012–2014: Bonner SC

Senior career*
Years	Team	Apps	(Gls)
2014–2016	1. FC Köln II	42	(11)
2015–2016	1. FC Köln	0	(0)
2016–2017	St. Gallen	21	(0)
2017–2020	Preußen Münster	56	(9)
2020–2021	Viktoria Köln	30	(11)
2021–2023	Karlsruher SC	41	(1)
2023–2024	Dynamo Dresden	14	(2)
2025	Viktoria Köln	11	(0)
2025–2026	Bonner SC	25	(6)
2026–	Sportfreunde Siegen	8	(2)

International career
2013–2014	Germany U18	5	(1)
2014–2015	Germany U19	11	(4)
2016	Germany U20	2	(0)
- * Club domestic league appearances and goals as of 23 September 2026

Lucas Cueto (born 24 March 1996) is a German professional footballer who plays as a forward for Regionalliga West club Sportfreunde Siegen.

== International career ==
Cueto was born in Germany and is of Spanish descent, and has represented German youth international teams.
