= Israel national under-18 football team =

National U-18 association football team

Israel under-18
- Association: IFA
- Confederation: UEFA (Europe)
- Head coach: (Israel) Eli Ohana
- FIFA code: ISR
First colours	Second colours

European Championship
- Appearances: 1 (first in 1997)
- Best result: Fourth Place, 1997

The Israel national under-18 football team represents Israel in international football at youth level and is controlled by Israel Football Association, the governing body for football in Israel.

The current coach is Eli Ohana.

== UEFA European U-18 Championship ==
UEFA European Under-18 Championship record									UEFA European Under-18 Championship qualification record					
Year	Round	Position	Pld	W	D *	L	GF	GA	Pld	W	D	L	GF	GA
(Germany) 1992	Qualifying round								6	3	2	1	8	5
(England) 1993	First qualifying round								4	0	2	2	3	6
(Spain) 1994	First qualifying round								2	1	0	1	2	1
(Greece) 1995	First qualifying round								2	0	0	2	1	3
(France) 1996	First qualifying round								2	1	1	0	3	2
(Iceland) 1997	Group stage	4th	3	0	1	2	1	3	4	4	0	0	10	6
(Cyprus) 1998	Second qualifying round								3	2	0	1	18	3
(Sweden) 1999	First qualifying round								3	1	0	2	3	4
(Germany) 2000	First qualifying round								2	1	1	0	5	4
(Finland) 2001	Second qualifying round								5	4	0	1	11	5
Total	Best: Group stage	1/10	3	0	1	2	1	3	33	17	6	10	64	39

*Draws include knockout matches decided on penalty kicks.
**Gold background color indicates that the tournament was won.
***Red border color indicates tournament was held on home soil.

== Current squad ==
Caps as of 14 October 2013.

No.	Pos.	Player	Date of birth (age)	Caps	Club
	GK	Sahar Hasson	24 April 1996 (age 30)	0	(Israel) Maccabi Tel Aviv
	GK	Raz Rahamim	26 November 1996 (age 29)	3	(Israel) Hapoel Be'er Sheva
	DF	Idan Cohen	6 January 1996 (age 30)	0	(Israel) Hapoel Tel Aviv
	DF	Atzil Sarsur	2 August 1996 (age 30)	0	(Israel) Maccabi Petah Tikva
	DF	Mor Pahima	10 January 1996 (age 30)	0	(Israel) Hapoel Tel Aviv
	DF	Omar Friov	4 June 1996 (age 30)	3	(Israel) Hapoel Ra'anana
	MF	Eran Biton	16 January 1996 (age 30)	0	(Israel) Maccabi Haifa
	MF	Neta Lavi	25 August 1996 (age 30)	0	(Israel) Maccabi Haifa
	MF	Stav Ben Aaron	10 January 1996 (age 30)	3	(Israel) Maccabi Haifa
	MF	Dan Glazer	20 September 1996 (age 30)	2	(Israel) Maccabi Tel Aviv
	MF	Or Hasidim	11 January 1996 (age 30)	3	(Israel) Ashdod
	MF	Raz Meir	30 November 1996 (age 29)	3	(Israel) Hapoel Rishon LeZion
	MF	Amit Mizrahi	15 April 1996 (age 30)	3	(Israel) Bnei Yehuda
	MF	Ron Nesicovsky	30 January 1996 (age 30)	3	(Israel) Beitar Nes Tubruk
	FW	Yoel Abuhatzira	12 July 1996 (age 30)	0	(Israel) Hapoel Tel Aviv
	FW	Or Illouz	12 January 1996 (age 30)	0	(Israel) Maccabi Haifa
	FW	Sean Weissman	14 February 1996 (age 30)	0	(Israel) Maccabi Haifa
	FW	Stav Nesicovsky	30 January 1996 (age 30)	0	(Israel) Beitar Nes Tubruk

== See also ==
- UEFA European Under-18 Championship
- Israel national football team
- Israel national under-21 football team
- Israel national under-19 football team
- Israel national under-17 football team
