= 1995 UEFA European Under-18 Championship =

1995 Ευρωπαϊκό πρωτάθλημα ποδοσφαίρου Κ-18

Tournament details
- Host country: Greece
- Dates: 15–22 July
- Teams: 8

Final positions
- Champions: Spain (3rd title)
- Runners-up: Italy
- Third place: Greece
- Fourth place: Netherlands

Tournament statistics
- Matches played: 14
- Goals scored: 56 (4 per match)

The UEFA European Under-18 Championship 1995 Final Tournament was held in Greece. Players born on or after 1 August 1976 were eligible to participate in this competition.

== Teams ==
The following teams qualified for the tournament:

- Greece (host)
- Hungary
- Italy
- Netherlands
- Norway
- Slovakia
- Spain
- Turkey

== Group stage ==
=== Group A ===
Teams	Pld	W	D	L	GF	GA	GD	Pts
Italy	3	2	0	1	6	3	+3	6
Greece	3	1	1	1	7	6	+1	4
Norway	3	1	1	1	5	4	+1	4
Slovakia	3	1	0	2	3	8	–5	3

15 July	Italy	4–1	Greece
	Norway	3–1	Slovakia
17 July	Italy	2–1	Norway
	Greece	5–1	Slovakia
19 July	Slovakia	1–0	Italy
	Norway	1–1	Greece

=== Group B ===
Teams	Pld	W	D	L	GF	GA	GD	Pts
Spain	3	3	0	0	7	2	+5	9
Netherlands	3	2	0	1	10	6	+4	6
Hungary	3	1	0	2	6	8	–2	3
Turkey	3	0	0	3	2	9	–7	0

15 July	Spain	2–1	Hungary
	Netherlands	4–1	Turkey
17 July	Spain	3–0	Turkey
	Netherlands	5–3	Hungary
19 July	Spain	2–1	Netherlands
	Hungary	2–1	Turkey

== Third place match ==
21 July 1995

Greece	5 – 0	Netherlands

Municipal Stadium of Katerini, Katerini
Referee: Taras Bezubiak (Russia)

== Final ==
22 July 1995

Spain	4 – 1	Italy
Carlitos 36', 61', 62'; Guti 43'		Totti 89'

Municipal Stadium of Katerini, Katerini
Referee: Atanas Uzunov (Bulgaria)

1995 UEFA European Under-18 Championship

Spain
Third title

== See also ==
- 1995 UEFA European Under-18 Championship qualifying
