= 2020 UEFA European Under-19 Championship =

Tournament details
- Host country: Northern Ireland
- Dates: Cancelled; Original schedule: 19 July – 1 August 2020; First revised schedule: 7–14 October 2020 (group stage); 11–14 November 2020 (knockout stage); Second revised schedule: November 2020 (group stage); March 2021 (knockout stage); Third revised schedule: March 2021
- Teams: 8 (from 1 confederation)
- Venue: 4 (in 4 host cities)

The 2020 UEFA European Under-19 Championship (also known as UEFA Under-19 Euro 2020) was scheduled to be the 19th edition of the UEFA European Under-19 Championship (69th edition if the Under-18 and Junior eras are included), the annual international youth football championship organised by UEFA for the men's under-19 national teams of Europe. Due to the COVID-19 pandemic, the tournament was initially postponed, rescheduled and was cancelled in October 2020.

Northern Ireland, which last hosted the tournament in 2005, was selected as host by UEFA on 9 December 2016.

As in previous editions held in even-numbered years, the tournament was due to act as the UEFA qualifiers for the FIFA U-20 World Cup. The top five teams of the tournament were to qualify for the 2021 FIFA U-20 World Cup in Indonesia as the UEFA representatives. Following the cancellation of the tournament, UEFA instead nominated the top five ranked countries in the qualifying round coefficient ranking.

== Postponements and eventual cancellation ==
The final tournament was originally scheduled to be played between 19 July – 1 August 2020. Due to the COVID-19 pandemic, UEFA announced on 1 April 2020 that the tournament had been postponed until further notice. On 17 June 2020, UEFA announced that the final tournament had been rescheduled and would be played in two periods, with the group stage played between 7–14 October 2020, and the knockout stage, which would consist of the semi-finals, the FIFA U-20 World Cup play-off and the final, played between 11 and 14 November 2020.

UEFA then announced on 13 August 2020 that after consultation with the 55 member associations, the final tournament had been further postponed, with the group stage played in November 2020 and the knockout stage played in March 2021. On 16 September 2020, UEFA announced that the tournament would be played in March 2021 in straight knock-out format, consisting of the quarter-finals, semi-finals, final, and play-off matches to decide the fifth team to qualify for the FIFA U-20 World Cup.

Finally, the tournament was cancelled by UEFA on 20 October 2020.

== Qualification ==
A total of 54 UEFA nations entered the competition. The hosts Northern Ireland would have qualified automatically, with the other 53 teams competing in the qualifying competition.

== Venues ==
The tournament was due to be held in four venues:

Belfast	2020 UEFA European Under-19 Championship is located in Northern Ireland	Ballymena
Windsor Park	2020 UEFA European Under-19 Championship is located in Northern Ireland	Ballymena Showgrounds
Capacity: 18,614	2020 UEFA European Under-19 Championship is located in Northern Ireland	Capacity: 3,600
group stage, semi-finals, final	2020 UEFA European Under-19 Championship is located in Northern Ireland	group stage
Portadown	2020 UEFA European Under-19 Championship is located in Northern Ireland	Lurgan
Shamrock Park	2020 UEFA European Under-19 Championship is located in Northern Ireland	Mourneview Park
Capacity: 2,770	2020 UEFA European Under-19 Championship is located in Northern Ireland	Capacity: 4,160
group stage	2020 UEFA European Under-19 Championship is located in Northern Ireland	group stage
