= 1996 UEFA European Under-18 Championship =

Championnat d'Europe de football des moins de 18 ans 1996 U-18-Fußball-Europameisterschaft 1996

Tournament details
- Host countries: France; Luxembourg
- Dates: 23–30 July
- Teams: 8

Final positions
- Champions: France (3rd title)
- Runners-up: Spain
- Third place: England
- Fourth place: Belgium

The UEFA European Under-18 Championship 1996 Final Tournament was held in France and Luxembourg. It also served as the European qualification for the 1997 FIFA World Youth Championship. Players born on or after 1 August 1977 were eligible to participate in this competition.

== Teams ==
The following teams qualified for the tournament:

- Belgium
- England
- France (host)
- Hungary
- Italy
- Portugal
- Republic of Ireland
- Spain

== Group stage ==
=== Group A ===
| Teams | Pld | W | D | L | GF | GA | GD | Pts |
|---|---|---|---|---|---|---|---|---|
| France | 3 | 2 | 1 | 0 | 4 | 2 | +2 | 7 |
| Belgium | 3 | 1 | 2 | 0 | 5 | 4 | +1 | 5 |
| Hungary | 3 | 1 | 0 | 2 | 5 | 4 | +1 | 3 |
| Portugal | 3 | 0 | 1 | 2 | 2 | 6 | –4 | 1 |

| 23 July | France | 2–1 | Hungary |
| | Portugal | 2–2 | Belgium |
| 25 July | France | 1–0 | Portugal |
| | Belgium | 2–1 | Hungary |
| 27 July | France | 1–1 | Belgium |
| | Hungary | 3–0 | Portugal |

=== Group B ===
| Teams | Pld | W | D | L | GF | GA | GD | Pts |
|---|---|---|---|---|---|---|---|---|
| Spain | 3 | 1 | 2 | 0 | 3 | 0 | +3 | 5 |
| England | 3 | 1 | 2 | 0 | 2 | 1 | +1 | 5 |
| Republic of Ireland | 3 | 0 | 2 | 1 | 1 | 2 | –1 | 2 |
| Italy | 3 | 0 | 2 | 1 | 2 | 5 | –3 | 2 |

| 23 July | Spain | 0–0 | England |
| | Italy | 1–1 | Republic of Ireland |
| 25 July | Italy | 1–1 | England |
| | Spain | 0–0 | Republic of Ireland |
| 27 July | Spain | 3–0 | Italy |
| | England | 1–0 | Republic of Ireland |

== Third place match ==
30 July 1996

| England | 3 – 2 (aet) | Belgium |

Besançon
Referee: Giorgos Bikas (Greece)

== Final ==
30 July 1996

| France | 1 – 0 | Spain |
|---|---|---|
| Henry 26' | Report |

Besançon
Referee: Rene Temmink (Netherlands)

1996 UEFA European Under-18 Championship

France
Third title

== Qualification to World Youth Championship ==
The six best performing teams qualified for the 1997 FIFA World Youth Championship.

- Belgium
- England
- France
- Hungary
- Republic of Ireland
- Spain

== See also ==
- 1996 UEFA European Under-18 Championship qualifying
