= 2005 UEFA European Under-19 Championship =

2005 UEFA Under-19 Championship
Tournament details
- Host country: Northern Ireland
- Dates: 18–29 July
- Teams: 8 (from 1 confederation)
- Venue: 5 (in 4 host cities)

Final positions
- Champions: France (6th title)
- Runners-up: England

Tournament statistics
- Matches played: 15
- Goals scored: 46 (3.07 per match)
- Top scorer(s): (Serbia and Montenegro) Borko Veselinović (5 goals)
- Best player: (France) Abdoulaye Balde

The 2005 UEFA European Under-19 Championship was held in Northern Ireland between 18 and 29 July 2005.

== Venues ==
Map of the final tournament venues

City / Town	Stadium	Host club(s)	Capacity
Belfast	Windsor Park	Linfield	18,000
Belfast	The Oval	Glentoran	15,250
Newry	The Showgrounds	Newry City	6,500
Lurgan	Mourneview Park	Glenavon	5,000
Ballymena	The Showgrounds	Ballymena United	5,000

== Qualifications ==
There were two separate rounds of qualifications held before the Final Tournament.

1. 2005 UEFA European Under-19 Championship qualification
2. 2005 UEFA European Under-19 Championship elite qualification

== Teams ==
The eight teams that participated in the final tournament were:

- Armenia
- England
- France
- Germany
- Greece
- Northern Ireland (host)
- Norway
- Serbia and Montenegro

== Match officials ==
Six referees were selected for the tournament:

- (Spain) Alberto Undiano Mallenco
- (Hungary) Viktor Kassai
- (Italy) Matteo Trefoloni
- (Netherlands) Pieter Vink
- (Portugal) Duarte Gomes
- (Slovenia) Damir Skomina

== Group stage ==
=== Group A ===
Teams	Pld	W	D	L	GF	GA	GD	Pts
Serbia and Montenegro	3	3	0	0	8	2	+6	9
Germany	3	2	0	1	7	5	+2	6
Greece	3	1	0	2	1	6	−5	3
Northern Ireland	3	0	0	3	1	4	−3	0

18 July 2005
19:00 UTC+1

Serbia and Montenegro	4–2	Germany
Veselinović 57', 59'; Marinković 75'; Markovski 90+3'	Report	Polanski 37'; Kučuković 51'

The Showgrounds, Newry
Referee: Alberto Undiano Mallenco (Spain)
18 July 2005
19:30 UTC+1

Northern Ireland	0–1	Greece
	Report	Petropoulos 15'

Windsor Park, Belfast
Referee: Viktor Kassai (Hungary)

20 July 2005
17:00 UTC+1

Greece	0–3	Germany
	Report	Müller 16'; Polanski 43'; Boateng 47'

Mourneview Park, Lurgan
Referee: Damir Skomina (Slovenia)
20 July 2005
19:00 UTC+1

Northern Ireland	0–1	Serbia and Montenegro
	Report	Veselinović 78'

The Showgrounds, Newry
Referee: Pieter Vink (Netherlands)

23 July 2005
17:00 UTC+1

Germany	2–1	Northern Ireland
Steinhöfer 85'; Epstein 89'	Report	Stewart 90+1'

The Showgrounds, Ballymena
Referee: Matteo Trefoloni (Italy)
23 July 2005
17:00 UTC+1

Greece	0–3	Serbia and Montenegro
	Report	Veselinović 4' (pen.), 43'; Arsenijević 16'

The Oval, Belfast
Referee: Duarte Gomes (Portugal)

=== Group B ===
Teams	Pld	W	D	L	GF	GA	GD	Pts
France	3	2	1	0	5	2	+3	7
England	3	1	2	0	5	4	+1	5
Norway	3	1	0	2	5	6	−1	3
Armenia	3	0	1	2	1	4	−3	1

18 July 2005
17:00 UTC+1

France	1–1	England
Baldé 19'	Report	Fryatt 9'

The Oval, Belfast
Referee: Matteo Trefoloni (Italy)
18 July 2005
19:00 UTC+1

Norway	2–0	Armenia
Aoudia 21'; Nisja 69'	Report

Mourneview Park, Lurgan
Referee: Damir Skomina (Slovenia)

20 July 2005
19:00 UTC+1

Armenia	1–1	England
Lombé 87'	Report	Petrosyan 72' (o.g.)

The Showgrounds, Ballymena
Referee: Viktor Kassai (Hungary)
20 July 2005
20:00 UTC+1

Norway	1–3	France
Larsen 57'	Report	Gourcuff 16' (pen.), 29', 83' (pen.)

Windsor Park, Belfast
Referee: Duarte Gomes (Portugal)

23 July 2005
19:00 UTC+1

Armenia	0–1	France
	Report	Cambon 31'

Mourneview Park, Lurgan
Referee: Pieter Vink (Netherlands)
23 July 2005
19:00 UTC+1

England	3–2	Norway
Mills 3'; Blackstock 80'; Wheater 83'	Report	Aoudia 23'; Hanssen 79'

The Showgrounds, Newry
Referee: Alberto Undiano Mallenco (Spain)

== Semi-finals ==
26 July 2005
16:30 UTC+1

Serbia and Montenegro	1–3	England
Marinković 87'	Report	Fryatt 18', 81', 90+3'

Mourneview Park, Lurgan
Referee: Viktor Kassai (Hungary)
26 July 2005
19:30 UTC+1

France	3–2	Germany
Baldé 34', 58'; Cabaye 63'	Report	Epstein 40'; Boateng 86'

The Showgrounds, Ballymena
Referee: Alberto Undiano Mallenco (Spain)

== Final ==
29 July 2005
19:00 UTC+1

England	1–3	France
Holmes 41'	Report	Chakouri 56'; Baldé 75'; Gouffran 88'

Windsor Park, Belfast
Attendance: 5,000
Referee: Pieter Vink (Netherlands)

2005 UEFA U-19 European champions

France
Sixth title

== Top scorers ==
5 goals

- (Serbia and Montenegro) Borko Veselinović

4 goals

- (France) Abdoulaye Baldé
- (England) Matty Fryatt

3 goals

- (France) Yoann Gourcuff

2 goals

- (Norway) Karim Aoudia
- (Germany) Kevin-Prince Boateng
- (Germany) Denis Epstein
- (Serbia and Montenegro) Nebojša Marinković
- (Germany) Eugen Polanski
