= Armenia national under-19 football team =

Armenia U-19
- Nickname: Minchev 19 (under 19)
- Association: Football Federation of Armenia
- Head coach: Razmig Grigoryan
- Most caps: Hovhannes Harutyunyan (32)
- Top scorer: Edgar Manucharyan (9)
- FIFA code: ARM
First colours	Second colours

First international
- Turkey 5–0 Armenia (Neuchâtel, Switzerland; October 4, 1993)

Biggest win
- Armenia 9–0 Gibraltar (Manavgat, Turkey; March 30, 2026)

Biggest defeat
- Armenia 0–9 Switzerland (Thun, Switzerland; October 8, 1993)

UEFA U-19 Championship
- Appearances: 2 (first in 2005)
- Best result: Group stage (2005, 2019)

FIFA U-20 World Cup
- Appearances: 1 (first in 2029)

The Armenia national under-19 football team is the youth football team of Armenia. The team is based mostly on the young players from the league and competes every year in order to qualify for the European Under-19 Football Championship. The team played its first match in 1993, Armenia having until 1992 been part of the Soviet Union.

In 2029, Armenia will co-host the FIFA U-20 World Cup along with Georgia, marking their first time taking part in the tournament. The team also earned an automatic qualification as co-host.

== History ==
Armenia U-19 team made its debut in a European competition in 2005. It finished in the fourth place in its group, and therefore did not qualify for the semifinals.

== FIFA U-20 World Cup ==
FIFA U-20 World Cup record
Year	Result	Pld	W	D	L	GF	GA	Squad
(Tunisia) 1977	Part of Soviet Union							
(Japan) 1979	Part of Soviet Union							
(Australia) 1981	Part of Soviet Union							
(Mexico) 1983	Part of Soviet Union							
(Soviet Union) 1985	Part of Soviet Union							
(Chile) 1987	Part of Soviet Union							
(Saudi Arabia) 1989	Part of Soviet Union							
(Portugal) 1991	Part of Soviet Union							
(Australia) 1993	Did not qualify							
(Qatar) 1995	Did not qualify							
(Malaysia) 1997	Did not qualify							
(Nigeria) 1999	Did not qualify							
(Argentina) 2001	Did not qualify							
(United Arab Emirates) 2003	Did not qualify							
(Netherlands) 2005	Did not qualify							
(Canada) 2007	Did not qualify							
(Egypt) 2009	Did not qualify							
(Colombia) 2011	Did not qualify							
(Turkey) 2013	Did not qualify							
(New Zealand) 2015	Did not qualify							
(South Korea) 2017	Did not qualify							
(Poland) 2019	Did not qualify							
(Argentina) 2023	Did not qualify							
(Chile) 2025	Did not qualify							
(Azerbaijan) (Uzbekistan) 2027	Did not qualify							
(Armenia) (Georgia (country)) 2029	Qualified as co-host							
Total	TBD	—	—	—	—	—	—	—

== UEFA European Under-19 Championship ==
Year	Result	MP	W	D*	L	GS	GA
(Norway) 2002	Qualifying round						
(Liechtenstein) 2003	Qualifying round						
(Switzerland) 2004	Qualifying round						
(Northern Ireland) 2005	Group Stage	3	0	1	2	1	4
(Poland) 2006	Qualifying round						
(Austria) 2007	Qualifying round						
(Czech Republic) 2008	Elite round						
(Ukraine) 2009	Qualifying round						
(France) 2010	Qualifying round						
(Romania) 2011	Qualifying round						
(Estonia) 2012	Elite round						
(Lithuania) 2013	Qualifying round						
(Hungary) 2014	Qualifying round						
(Greece) 2015	Qualifying round						
(Germany) 2016	Qualifying round						
(Georgia (country)) 2017	Qualifying round						
(Finland) 2018	Qualifying round						
(Armenia) 2019	Group Stage	3	0	0	3	1	12
(Northern Ireland) ~~2020~~	Cancelled due to the COVID-19 pandemic						
(Romania) ~~2021~~	Cancelled due to the COVID-19 pandemic						
(Slovakia) 2022	Elite round						
(Malta) 2023	Qualifying round						
(Northern Ireland) 2024	Qualifying round						
(Romania) 2025	Qualifying round						
(Wales) 2026	Qualifying round						
(Czech Republic) 2027	TBD						
Total	2/23	6	0	1	5	2	16

== Managers ==
- Sargis Hovsepyan – 2013 – November 25, 2014
- Marc Leliévre – November 26, 2014 – December 7, 2015
- Aram Voskanyan – February 2016 – December 2016
- Misha Djorkaeff - June 2025 – February 2026

== Current squad ==
The following players were called up for 2027 UEFA European Under-19 Championship qualification fixtures against Kosovo, Türkiye, and Gibraltar between 24-30 March 2026.

No.	Pos.	Player	Date of birth (age)	Club
12	GK	Artur Petrosyan	2 February 2008 (age 18)	(Football Federation of Armenia) Pyunik
1	GK	Roman Khachatryan	16 November 2008 (age 17)	(Football Federation of Armenia) Noah
16	GK	Nubar Gishyan	22 October 2008 (age 18)	(Football Federation of Armenia) Urartu
22	DF	Edmond Hayrapetyan	21 May 2008 (age 18)	(Football Federation of Armenia) Pyunik
2	DF	Armen Sukiasyan	8 August 2008 (age 18)	(Football Federation of Armenia) Pyunik
4	DF	Hayk Ghukasyan	2 June 2008 (age 18)	(Football Federation of Armenia) Ararat-Armenia
5	DF	Edgar Poghosyan	18 June 2008 (age 18)	(Football Federation of Armenia) Ararat-Armenia
3	DF	Artur Movsesyan	2 January 2008 (age 18)	(Football Federation of Armenia) BKMA Yerevan
18	MF	Ashot Voskanyan	15 August 2008 (age 18)	(Football Federation of Armenia) Urartu
21	MF	Martun Hovhannisyan	1 October 2008 (age 18)	(Football Federation of Armenia) Ararat-Armenia
20	MF	Zhirayr Ashikyan	7 November 2008 (age 17)	(Football Federation of Armenia) Pyunik
8	MF	Martin Shahgeldyan	5 January 2008 (age 18)	(French Football Federation) SR Colmar
14	MF	Harutyun Movsisyan	14 July 2008 (age 18)	(Football Federation of Armenia) Ararat-Armenia
13	FW	Davit Davtyan	10 June 2008 (age 18)	(Football Federation of Armenia) Gandzasar
7	FW	Daniel Ambartsumov	7 March 2008 (age 18)	(Russian Football Union) Krasnodar
10	FW	David Batoyan	26 April 2008 (age 18)	(Russian Football Union) Rostov
17	FW	Albert Gareginyan	3 November 2008 (age 18)	(Football Federation of Armenia) Noah
9	FW	Michael Asiryan	26 February 2008 (age 18)	(Football Federation of Armenia) Noah
11	FW	Sargis Gasparyan	20 August 2008 (age 18)	(Football Federation of Armenia) Urartu

== Recent call-ups ==
The following players were called up within the last twelve months and remain ineligible.

Pos.	Player	Date of birth (age)	Caps	Goals	Club	Latest call-up
