= 2011 UEFA European Under-19 Championship squads =

Player listings in youth football competition

This article will display the squads for the 2011 UEFA European Under-19 Championship. Only players born on or after 1 January 1992 were eligible to play.

Every team had to submit a list of 18 players. Two of them must be goalkeepers.

Age, caps and goals are as of the start of the tournament, July 20, 2011.

Players in bold have later been capped at full international level.

== Group A ==
=== Czech Republic ===
Head coach: Jaroslav Hřebík

The following players were named in the squad on 15 July 2011.

No.	Pos.	Player	Date of birth (age)	Caps	Goals	Club
1	GK	**Tomáš Koubek**	26 August 1992 (aged 18)	13	0	(Football Association of the Czech Republic) Hradec Králové
2	DF	**Jakub Brabec** (c)	6 August 1992 (aged 18)	20	0	(Football Association of the Czech Republic) Sparta Prague
3	DF	**Jakub Jugas**	5 May 1992 (aged 19)	16	1	(Football Association of the Czech Republic) Tescoma Zlín
4	MF	**Adam Jánoš**	20 July 1992 (aged 19)	9	0	(Football Association of the Czech Republic) Sparta Prague
5	DF	**Tomáš Kalas**	15 May 1993 (aged 18)	3	0	(The Football Association) Chelsea
6	DF	**Pavel Kadeřábek**	25 April 1992 (aged 19)	16	1	(Football Association of the Czech Republic) Sparta Prague
7	MF	Martin Kraus	30 May 1992 (aged 19)	4	0	(Football Association of the Czech Republic) Bohemians 1905
8	MF	Martin Sladký	1 March 1992 (aged 19)	11	3	(Football Association of the Czech Republic) Viktoria Plzeň
9	FW	**Jiří Skalák**	12 March 1992 (aged 19)	20	2	(Football Association of the Czech Republic) Sparta Prague
10	FW	Antonín Fantiš	15 April 1992 (aged 19)	12	1	(Football Association of the Czech Republic) Baník Ostrava
11	DF	Patrik Lácha	20 January 1992 (aged 19)	5	2	(Football Association of the Czech Republic) Teplice
12	DF	Tomáš Jeleček	25 February 1992 (aged 19)	11	1	(Football Association of the Czech Republic) Slovácko
13	MF	**Ladislav Krejčí**	5 July 1992 (aged 19)	18	4	(Football Association of the Czech Republic) Sparta Prague
14	FW	Tomáš Přikryl	4 July 1992 (aged 19)	19	2	(Football Association of the Czech Republic) Sigma Olomouc
15	FW	Vojtěch Hadaščok	8 January 1992 (aged 19)	5	0	(Football Association of the Czech Republic) Slovan Liberec
16	GK	Jakub Zapletal	30 March 1992 (aged 19)	17	0	(Football Association of the Czech Republic) Tescoma Zlín
17	MF	Martin Hála	24 March 1992 (aged 19)	13	0	(Football Association of the Czech Republic) Sigma Olomouc
18	DF	Roman Polom	11 January 1992 (aged 19)	11	0	(Football Association of the Czech Republic) Sparta Prague

=== Greece ===
Head coach: Leonidas Vokolos

No.	Pos.	Player	Date of birth (age)	Caps	Goals	Club
1	GK	**Stefanos Kapino**	18 March 1994 (aged 17)	2	0	(Hellenic Football Federation) Panathinaikos
2	DF	Nikos Skondras	16 November 1992 (aged 18)	2	0	(Hellenic Football Federation) Asteras Tripolis
3	MF	**Kostas Stafylidis**	2 December 1993 (aged 17)	5	0	(Hellenic Football Federation) PAOK
4	MF	Anastasios Lagos	12 April 1992 (aged 19)	2	0	(Hellenic Football Federation) Panathinaikos
5	DF	Giannis Potouridis (c)	27 February 1992 (aged 19)	6	0	(Hellenic Football Federation) Olympiacos
6	DF	Panagiotis Stamogiannos	30 January 1992 (aged 19)	6	0	(Hellenic Football Federation) Olympiacos
7	MF	**Charis Mavrias**	21 February 1994 (aged 17)	3	1	(Hellenic Football Federation) Panathinaikos
8	MF	Kostas Kotsaridis	12 June 1992 (aged 19)	5	0	(Hellenic Football Federation) Olympiacos
9	FW	**Anastasios Bakasetas**	28 June 1993 (aged 18)	0	0	(Hellenic Football Federation) Asteras Tripolis
10	MF	**Kostas Fortounis**	16 October 1992 (aged 18)	3	0	(Hellenic Football Federation) Asteras Tripolis
11	FW	**Nikos Karelis**	24 February 1992 (aged 19)	3	0	(Hellenic Football Federation) Ergotelis
12	GK	Kostas Kaldelis	22 March 1992 (aged 19)	4	0	(Hellenic Football Federation) Olympiacos
13	MF	Vasilis Bouzas	30 June 1993 (aged 18)	2	0	(Hellenic Football Federation) Panionios
14	DF	Nikos Marinakis	12 September 1993 (aged 17)	5	0	(Hellenic Football Federation) Panathinaikos
15	MF	Kostas Rougalas	13 October 1993 (aged 17)	3	1	(Hellenic Football Federation) Olympiacos
16	FW	**Dimitrios Diamantakos**	5 March 1993 (aged 18)	3	0	(Hellenic Football Federation) Olympiacos
17	MF	Giorgos Katidis	12 February 1993 (aged 18)	6	1	(Hellenic Football Federation) Aris
18	MF	**Dimitris Kolovos**	27 April 1993 (aged 18)	4	0	(Hellenic Football Federation) Panionios

=== Republic of Ireland ===
Head coach: Paul Doolin

No.	Pos.	Player	Date of birth (age)	Caps	Goals	Club
1	GK	Aaron McCarey	14 January 1992 (aged 19)	6	0	(The Football Association) Wolverhampton Wanderers
2	DF	**Matt Doherty**	16 January 1992 (aged 19)	3	0	(The Football Association) Wolverhampton Wanderers
3	DF	**Derrick Williams**	17 January 1993 (aged 18)	3	0	(The Football Association) Aston Villa
4	DF	**John Egan** (c)	20 October 1992 (aged 18)	5	0	(The Football Association) Sunderland
5	DF	Anthony O'Connor	25 October 1992 (aged 18)	3	0	(The Football Association) Blackburn Rovers
6	MF	**Jeff Hendrick**	31 January 1992 (aged 19)	6	1	(The Football Association) Derby County
7	MF	Samir Carruthers	4 April 1993 (aged 18)	2	0	(The Football Association) Aston Villa
8	FW	John O'Sullivan	18 September 1993 (aged 17)	3	0	(The Football Association) Blackburn Rovers
9	FW	Kevin Knight	13 February 1993 (aged 18)	1	0	(The Football Association) Leicester City
10	FW	Conor Murphy	11 November 1992 (aged 18)	3	1	(Football Association of Ireland) Bray Wanderers
11	MF	Anthony Forde	16 November 1993 (aged 17)	3	0	(The Football Association) Wolverhampton Wanderers
12	MF	Kane Ferdinand	7 October 1992 (aged 18)	0	0	(The Football Association) Southend United
14	MF	Eoin Wearen	2 October 1992 (aged 18)	2	0	(The Football Association) West Ham United
15	MF	Sean Murray	11 October 1993 (aged 17)	3	1	(The Football Association) Watford
16	GK	Sean McDermott	30 May 1993 (aged 18)	0	0	(The Football Association) Arsenal
17	DF	Declan Walker	1 March 1992 (aged 19)	6	0	(The Football Association) Wrexham
18	DF	Joe Shaughnessy	6 July 1992 (aged 19)	1	1	(Scottish Football Association) Aberdeen
19	MF	Connor Smith	18 February 1993 (aged 18)	0	0	(The Football Association) Watford

=== Romania ===
Head coach: (Romania) Lucian Burchel

No.	Pos.	Player	Date of birth (age)	Caps	Goals	Club
1	GK	Laurențiu Brănescu	30 March 1994 (aged 17)			(Italian Football Federation) Juventus
2	DF	Andrei Peteleu	20 August 1992 (aged 18)			(Romanian Football Federation) Delta Tulcea
3	DF	Lucian Murgoci	25 March 1992 (aged 19)			(Romanian Football Federation) Oțelul II Galați
4	DF	Sebastian Remeș	19 January 1992 (aged 19)			(Hungarian Football Federation) Budapest Honvéd
5	DF	Adrian Avrămia	31 January 1992 (aged 19)			(Romanian Football Federation) CSMS Iaşi
6	MF	**Romario Benzar**	26 March 1992 (aged 19)			(Romanian Football Federation) Viitorul Constanța
7	FW	Ionuț Năstăsie (c)	7 January 1992 (aged 19)			(Romanian Football Federation) Steaua II București
8	MF	Alin Cârstocea	16 January 1992 (aged 19)			(Romanian Football Federation) Viitorul Constanța
9	FW	Mihai Roman	31 May 1992 (aged 19)			(Romanian Football Federation) Universitatea Craiova
10	MF	**Nicolae Stanciu**	7 May 1993 (aged 18)			(Romanian Football Federation) Unirea Alba Iulia
11	FW	Tiberiu Serediuc	2 July 1992 (aged 19)			(Romanian Football Federation) Otopeni
12	GK	Radu Florian Chiriță	8 May 1992 (aged 19)			(Romanian Football Federation) Râmnicu Vâlcea
13	MF	Patrick Walleth	27 January 1992 (aged 19)			(German Football Association) Ingolstadt 04 II
14	DF	Costinel Gugu	20 May 1992 (aged 19)			(Romanian Football Federation) Universitatea Craiova
15	MF	Enghin Amet	19 July 1992 (aged 19)			(Romanian Football Federation) Juventus București
16	FW	Florin Ilie	18 June 1992 (aged 19)			(Romanian Football Federation) Politehnica II Timișoara
17	FW	Sebastian Chitoșcă	2 October 1992 (aged 18)			(Romanian Football Federation) Ceahlăul Piatra Neamț
18	FW	Cristian Gavra	3 April 1993 (aged 18)			(Romanian Football Federation) Viitorul Constanța

== Group B ==
=== Belgium ===
Head coach: Marc Van Geersom

No.	Pos.	Player	Date of birth (age)	Caps	Goals	Club
1	GK	**Koen Casteels**	25 June 1992 (aged 19)	4	0	(German Football Association) 1899 Hoffenheim
2	DF	Pierre-Yves Ngawa	9 February 1992 (aged 19)	3	0	(Royal Belgian Football Association) Standard Liège
3	DF	Dino Arslanagić	24 April 1993 (aged 18)	6	0	(Royal Belgian Football Association) Standard Liège
4	DF	Laurens De Bock	7 November 1992 (aged 18)	3	0	(Royal Belgian Football Association) Lokeren
5	DF	Jannes Vansteenkiste	17 February 1993 (aged 18)	0	0	(Royal Belgian Football Association) Club Brugge
6	MF	Tom Pietermaat	6 September 1992 (aged 18)	6	0	(Royal Belgian Football Association) Mechelen
7	DF	Marnick Vermijl	13 January 1992 (aged 19)	5	1	(The Football Association) Manchester United
8	MF	Jore Trompet	30 July 1992 (aged 18)	6	0	(Royal Belgian Football Association) Lokeren
9	MF	Maxime Lestienne	17 June 1992 (aged 19)	1	0	(Royal Belgian Football Association) Club Brugge
10	FW	**Thorgan Hazard**	29 March 1993 (aged 18)	6	2	(French Football Federation) Lens
11	FW	**Paul-José M'Poku**	19 April 1992 (aged 19)	4	1	(Royal Belgian Football Association) Standard Liège
12	GK	Thomas Kaminski	23 October 1992 (aged 18)	1	0	(Royal Belgian Football Association) Beerschot AC
13	DF	Jonas Vervaeke	10 January 1992 (aged 19)	1	0	(Royal Belgian Football Association) Kortrijk
14	MF	Franco Zennaro	1 April 1993 (aged 18)	0	0	(Royal Belgian Football Association) Standard Liège
15	MF	Hannes Van der Bruggen	1 April 1993 (aged 18)	5	1	(Royal Belgian Football Association) Gent
16	MF	Florent Cuvelier (c)	12 September 1992 (aged 18)	5	0	(The Football Association) Stoke City
17	FW	**Igor Vetokele**	23 March 1992 (aged 19)	3	0	(Royal Belgian Football Association) Gent
18	MF	Alessandro Cerigioni	30 September 1992 (aged 18)	3	3	(Royal Belgian Football Association) Lommel United

=== Serbia ===
Head coach: Dejan Govedarica

No.	Pos.	Player	Date of birth (age)	Caps	Goals	Club
1	GK	Nikola Perić	4 February 1992 (aged 19)	2	0	(Football Association of Serbia) Vojvodina
2	DF	Jovan Krneta	4 May 1992 (aged 19)	4	0	(Football Association of Serbia) Red Star Belgrade
3	DF	**Marko Petković**	3 September 1992 (aged 18)	6	0	(Football Association of Serbia) OFK Beograd
4	MF	Filip Malbašić	18 November 1992 (aged 18)	4	0	(Football Association of Serbia) Rad
5	DF	Uroš Ćosić (c)	24 October 1992 (aged 18)	5	0	(Football Association of Serbia) Red Star Belgrade
6	FW	**Miloš Jojić**	19 March 1992 (aged 19)	2	0	(Football Association of Serbia) Teleoptik
7	MF	Andrej Mrkela	9 April 1992 (aged 19)	6	1	(Football Association of Serbia) Rad
8	MF	**Darko Brašanac**	12 February 1992 (aged 19)	5	1	(Football Association of Serbia) Partizan
9	FW	Đorđe Despotović	4 March 1992 (aged 19)	4	1	(Football Association of Serbia) Spartak Subotica
10	MF	Goran Čaušić	5 May 1992 (aged 19)	6	1	(Football Association of Serbia) Red Star Belgrade
11	MF	Nenad Lukić	2 September 1992 (aged 18)	5	6	(Bulgarian Football Union) Lokomotiv Plovdiv
12	GK	Spasoje Stefanović	12 October 1992 (aged 18)	1	0	(Football Association of Serbia) BSK Borča
13	DF	Aleksandar Pantić	14 April 1992 (aged 19)	3	0	(Football Association of Serbia) Rad
14	FW	Nikola Trujić	14 April 1992 (aged 19)	5	1	(Football Association of Serbia) Smederevo
15	DF	Uroš Vitas	6 July 1992 (aged 19)	2	0	(Football Association of Serbia) Rad
16	FW	**Aleksandar Pešić**	21 May 1992 (aged 19)	3	0	(Moldovan Football Federation) Sheriff Tiraspol
17	MF	Ivan Rogač	18 June 1992 (aged 19)	3	0	(Football Association of Serbia) Rad
18	DF	Danilo Kuzmanović	4 January 1992 (aged 19)	3	0	(Swedish Football Association) Djurgården

=== Spain ===
Head coach: Ginés Meléndez

No.	Pos.	Player	Date of birth (age)	Caps	Goals	Club
1	GK	Edgar Badia	12 February 1992 (aged 19)	8	0	(Royal Spanish Football Federation) Espanyol
2	DF	**Dani Carvajal**	11 January 1992 (aged 19)	9	0	(Royal Spanish Football Federation) Real Madrid
3	DF	Sergi Gómez	28 March 1992 (aged 19)	8	0	(Royal Spanish Football Federation) Barcelona
4	DF	Ignasi Miquel	28 September 1992 (aged 18)	4	1	(The Football Association) Arsenal
5	DF	Jon Aurtenetxe	3 January 1992 (aged 19)	4	0	(Royal Spanish Football Federation) Athletic Bilbao
6	MF	Rubén Pardo	22 October 1992 (aged 18)	8	0	(Royal Spanish Football Federation) Real Sociedad
7	FW	**Álvaro Morata**	23 October 1992 (aged 18)	9	5	(Royal Spanish Football Federation) Real Madrid
8	MF	Álex Fernández	15 October 1992 (aged 18)	5	0	(Royal Spanish Football Federation) Real Madrid
9	FW	Borja Bastón	25 August 1992 (aged 18)	0	0	(Royal Spanish Football Federation) Atlético Madrid
10	MF	**Pablo Sarabia (c)**	11 May 1992 (aged 19)	11	6	(Royal Spanish Football Federation) Getafe
11	FW	**Paco Alcácer**	30 August 1993 (aged 17)	3	1	(Royal Spanish Football Federation) Valencia
12	DF	Albert Blázquez	21 January 1992 (aged 19)	6	0	(Royal Spanish Football Federation) Espanyol
13	GK	Adrián Ortolá	20 August 1993 (aged 17)	0	0	(Royal Spanish Football Federation) Villarreal
14	DF	**Jonás Ramalho**	10 June 1993 (aged 18)	3	0	(Royal Spanish Football Federation) Athletic Bilbao
15	FW	**Juanmi**	20 May 1993 (aged 18)	6	4	(Royal Spanish Football Federation) Málaga
16	MF	**José Campaña**	31 May 1993 (aged 18)	0	0	(Royal Spanish Football Federation) Sevilla
17	MF	**Gerard Deulofeu**	13 March 1994 (aged 17)	5	0	(Royal Spanish Football Federation) Barcelona
18	MF	Juan Muñiz	14 March 1992 (aged 19)	3	0	(Royal Spanish Football Federation) Sporting Gijón

=== Turkey ===
Head coach: Kemal Özdeş

No.	Pos.	Player	Date of birth (age)	Caps	Goals	Club
1	GK	Ömer Kahveci	15 February 1992 (aged 19)	6	0	(Turkish Football Federation) Bucaspor
2	DF	Okan Alkan	1 October 1992 (aged 18)	6	0	(Turkish Football Federation) Fenerbahçe
3	MF	Kamil Çörekçi	1 February 1992 (aged 19)	3	0	(Turkish Football Federation) Bucaspor
4	DF	Furkan Şeker	17 March 1992 (aged 19)			(Turkish Football Federation) Beşiktaş
5	DF	Sezer Özmen	7 July 1992 (aged 19)	5	0	(Turkish Football Federation) Çaykur Rizespor
6	MF	Orhan Gülle (c)	15 January 1992 (aged 19)	5	1	(Turkish Football Federation) Gaziantepspor
7	MF	Ömer Ali Şahiner	2 January 1992 (aged 19)	6	3	(Turkish Football Federation) Konya Şekerspor
8	MF	Gökay Iravul	18 October 1992 (aged 18)	6	0	(Turkish Football Federation) Fenerbahçe
9	FW	Muhammet Demir	10 January 1992 (aged 19)			(Turkish Football Federation) Gaziantepspor
10	MF	Engin Bekdemir	7 February 1992 (aged 19)	5	4	(Portuguese Football Federation) Porto
11	FW	Nadir Çiftçi	12 February 1992 (aged 19)			(The Football Association) Portsmouth
12	GK	Aykut Özer	1 January 1993 (aged 18)	0	0	(German Football Association) Eintracht Frankfurt
13	DF	Sefa Başıbüyük	18 October 1993 (aged 17)	3	0	(Turkish Football Federation) Çorumspor
14	DF	Berkay Öztuvan	5 February 1992 (aged 19)	3	0	(Turkish Football Federation) Fenerbahçe
15	DF	**Atınç Nukan**	20 July 1992 (aged 19)	0	0	(Turkish Football Federation) Beşiktaş
16	MF	Şervan Taştan	20 May 1993 (aged 18)			(French Football Federation) Metz
17	FW	Ali Dere	29 September 1992 (aged 18)	3	1	(Turkish Football Federation) Konyaspor
18	FW	Hasan Ahmet Sarı	21 January 1992 (aged 19)	3	2	(Turkish Football Federation) Trabzonspor
