= 2011 UEFA European Under-19 Championship elite qualification =

2011 UEFA European Under-19 Championship (Elite Round) was the second round of qualifications for the final tournament of 2011 UEFA European Under-19 Championship. The 28 teams that advanced from the qualifying round were distributed into seven groups of four teams each, with each group contested in a round-robin format, with one of the four teams hosting all six group games. The seven group-winning teams qualified automatically for the final tournament in Romania. The draw was held at 30 November 2010 at 12:15 (CET) at Nyon, Switzerland.

== Seeding ==
Pot A	Pot B	Pot C	Pot D
Spain; Netherlands; Serbia; Belgium; Italy; France; Germany	Turkey; England; Norway; Republic of Ireland; Estonia; Slovakia; Russia	Ukraine; Hungary; Belarus; Israel; Switzerland; Portugal; Wales	Montenegro; Czech Republic; Poland; Greece; Croatia; Macedonia; Moldova

The hosts of the seven one-venue mini-tournament groups are indicated below in italics.

The matches was played between 28 April–5 June 2011.

== Tiebreaker rules for qualification groups ==
Per uefa.com the criteria used to rank two or more teams even on points are:

1. Points earned in head-to-head matches
2. Goal difference in head-to-head matches
3. Goals scored in head-to-head matches
4. Goal difference in all group matches
5. Goals scored in all group matches
6. Drawing of lots
- If head-to-head criteria eliminate one team from a three- or four-way tie, then revert to the first step with the remaining teams.
- If two teams are tied and play against each other in their last group match, then penalty kicks will be used instead of the criteria listed above.

== Group 1 ==
Team	Pld	W	D	L	GF	GA	GD	Pts
Belgium	3	2	1	0	4	2	+2	7
Portugal	3	2	0	1	4	1	+3	6
Croatia	3	1	0	2	3	4	−1	3
Estonia	3	0	1	2	0	4	−4	1

24 May 2011
17:00

Belgium	1–0	Portugal
Lestienne 25'	Report

Stadion Veli Jože, Poreč
Referee: Vladimir Kazmenko (Russia)

24 May 2011
17:00

Estonia	0–1	Croatia
	Report	Mić 40'

Stadion Valbruna, Rovinj
Referee: Steven McLean (Scotland)

26 May 2011
17:00

Belgium	3–2	Croatia
Lestienne 23'; Rykx 57'; Hazard 88'	Report	Blažević 28'; Mić 87'

Gradski stadion Laco, Novigrad
Referee: Vladimir Kazmenko (Russia)

26 May 2011
17:00

Portugal	3–0	Estonia
Carvalho 44'; Cá 56'; Cavaleiro 88'	Report

Gradski stadion, Umag
Referee: Eli Hacmon (Israel)

29 May 2011
17:00

Estonia	0–0	Belgium
	Report

Stadion Veli Jože, Poreč
Referee: Eli Hacmon (Israel)

29 May 2011
17:00

Croatia	0–1	Portugal
	Report	Barros 18'

Stadion Valbruna, Rovinj
Referee: Steven McLean (Scotland)

== Group 2 ==
Team	Pld	W	D	L	GF	GA	GD	Pts
Spain	3	2	1	0	6	2	+4	7
England	3	2	1	0	5	3	+2	7
Switzerland	3	1	0	2	6	7	−1	3
Montenegro	3	0	0	3	2	7	−5	0

31 May 2011
19:00

Spain	2–1	Switzerland
Juanmi 3'; Isco 74'	Report	Amat 77' (o.g.)

Juan-Antonio Samaranch Stadium, Lausanne
Referee: Paolo Silvio Mazzoleni (Italy)

31 May 2011
19:00

England	1–0	Montenegro
Kane 51'	Report

Stade Municipal, Yverdon
Referee: Yevhen Aranovskiy (Ukraine)

2 June 2011
15:30

Spain	3–0	Montenegro
Juanmi 52', 61'; Morata 75'	Report

Juan-Antonio Samaranch Stadium, Lausanne
Referee: Alexander Kostadinov (Bulgaria)

2 June 2011
17:30

Switzerland	2–3	England
Kamber 14'; Seferovic 90+1'	Report	Williams 20'; Ngoo 45'; Thorne 90+4'

Centre sportif de Colovray Nyon, Nyon
Referee: Yevhen Aranovskiy (Ukraine)

5 June 2011
17:00

England	1–1	Spain
Kane 45+2'	Report	Isco 26'

Centre sportif de Colovray Nyon, Nyon
Referee: Alexander Kostadinov (Bulgaria)

5 June 2011
17:00

Montenegro	2–3	Switzerland
Đorđević 41'; Mrdak 58'	Report	Drmić 20', 74'; Freuler 25'

Stade Municipal, Yverdon
Referee: Paolo Silvio Mazzoleni (Italy)

== Group 3 ==
Team	Pld	W	D	L	GF	GA	GD	Pts
Greece	3	3	0	0	5	2	+3	9
France	3	2	0	1	5	2	+3	6
Slovakia	3	1	0	2	6	4	+2	3
Belarus	3	0	0	3	0	8	−8	0

20 May 2011
11:00

Slovakia	1–2	Greece
Lásik 18'	Report	Katidis 5'; Bartek 36' (o.g.)

The Slovak FA National Training Centre, Senec
Referee: Deniz Aytekin (Germany)

20 May 2011
15:00

France	2–0	Belarus
Derouard 25'; Taïder 35'	Report

NTC Stadion, Veľký Biel
Referee: Jakob Kehlet (Denmark)

22 May 2011
11:00

Belarus	0–5	Slovakia
	Report	Špilár 19', 74'; Škvarka 45+2'; Hladík 68'; Aliseiko 78' (o.g.)

The Slovak FA National Training Centre, Senec
Referee: Jakob Kehlet (Denmark)

22 May 2011
15:00

France	1–2	Greece
Taïder 21'	Report	Vellios 25'; Rougkalas 47'

NTC Stadion, Veľký Biel
Referee: Anar Salmanov (Azerbaijan)

25 May 2011
11:00

Slovakia	0–2	France
	Report	Situ 64'; Derouard 79' (pen.)

The Slovak FA National Training Centre, Senec
Referee: Deniz Aytekin (Germany)

25 May 2011
11:00

Greece	1–0	Belarus
Mavrias 49'	Report

Štadión pod Zoborom, Nitra
Referee: Anar Salmanov (Azerbaijan)

== Group 4 ==
Team	Pld	W	D	L	GF	GA	GD	Pts
Republic of Ireland	3	2	1	0	4	0	+4	7
Italy	3	2	0	1	4	4	0	6
Ukraine	3	0	2	1	1	2	−1	2
Poland	3	0	1	2	2	5	−3	1

24 May 2011
17:00

Italy	1–0	Ukraine
Beretta 67'	Report

Stadion Skałka im. Pawła Waloszka, Szczecinek
Referee: Pavle Radovanović (Montenegro)

24 May 2011
17:00

Republic of Ireland	1–0	Poland
Hendrick 15'	Report

Gwardia Koszalin, Koszalin
Referee: Antonio Mateu Lahoz (Spain)

26 May 2011
17:00

Ukraine	0–0	Republic of Ireland
	Report

Gwardia Koszalin, Koszalin
Referee: Bardhyl Pashaj (Albania)

26 May 2011
20:30

Italy	3–1	Poland
Sampirisi 14'; Minotti 69'; Viviani 80'	Report	Żyro 39'

MOSiR Stadium, Kołobrzeg
Referee: Antonio Mateu Lahoz (Spain)

29 May 2011
16:00

Republic of Ireland	3–0	Italy
Murphy 32'; Murray 61'; O'Sullivan 81'	Report

MOSiR Stadium, Kołobrzeg
Referee: Pavle Radovanović (Montenegro)

29 May 2011
16:00

Poland	1–1	Ukraine
Żyro 45'	Report	Kalitvintsev 68'

Stadion Skałka im. Pawła Waloszka, Szczecinek
Referee: Bardhyl Pashaj (Albania)

== Group 5 ==
Team	Pld	W	D	L	GF	GA	GD	Pts
Czech Republic	3	2	1	0	3	1	+2	7
Russia	3	1	2	0	4	2	+2	5
Netherlands	3	0	2	1	2	3	−1	2
Israel	3	0	1	2	3	6	−3	1

19 May 2011
16:00

Netherlands	1–1	Israel
Özyakup 77'	Report	Kahat 29'

Mestsky sportovni klub Breclav, Břeclav
Referee: Marios Panayi (Cyprus)

19 May 2011
16:00

Russia	0–0	Czech Republic
	Report

Městský stadion Kyjov, Kyjov
Referee: Ivan Kružliak (Slovakia)

21 May 2011
16:00

Netherlands	0–1	Czech Republic
	Report	Přikryl 16'

Na Slajsi, Lanžhot
Referee: Paolo Valeri (Italy)

21 May 2011
16:00

Israel	1–3	Russia
Agayov 5'	Report	Ozdoev 14'; Makhmudov 29'; Khodyrev 65'

Městský stadion Kyjov, Kyjov
Referee: Ivan Kružliak (Slovakia)

24 May 2011
16:00

Russia	1–1	Netherlands
Emelyanov 53' (pen.)	Report	Castaignos 18'

Na Slajsi, Lanžhot
Referee: Marios Panayi (Cyprus)

24 May 2011
16:00

Czech Republic	2–1	Israel
Lácha 73'; Sladký 83'	Report	Dabour 72'

Mestsky sportovni klub Breclav, Břeclav
Referee: Paolo Valeri (Italy)

== Group 6 ==
Team	Pld	W	D	L	GF	GA	GD	Pts
Serbia	3	2	0	1	10	3	+7	6
Wales	3	2	0	1	6	5	+1	6
Norway	3	2	0	1	7	4	+3	6
Moldova	3	0	0	3	0	11	−11	0

28 April 2011
15:00

Serbia	2–3	Wales
Milunović 39'; Lukić 90'	Report	Peniket 36', 43'; Alfei 90+2' (pen.)

Sarpsborg Stadion, Sarpsborg
Referee: Harald Lechner (Austria)

28 April 2011
19:30

Norway	4–0	Moldova
Bakenga 30' (pen.), 45', 50'; De Lanlay 37'	Report

Sarpsborg Stadion, Sarpsborg
Referee: Ruddy Buquet (France)

30 April 2011
13:00

Serbia	5–0	Moldova
Prodan 13' (o.g.); Čaušić 61'; Lukić 74', 90'; Trujić 87'	Report

Sarpsborg Stadion, Sarpsborg
Referee: Ruddy Buquet (France)

30 April 2011
17:30

Wales	1–3	Norway
Lucas 7'	Report	Henriksen 3'; De Lanlay 26'; Nielsen 74'

Sarpsborg Stadion, Sarpsborg
Referee: Miroslav Zelinka (Czech Republic)

3 May 2011
17:00

Norway	0–3	Serbia
	Report	Lukić 28', 40' (pen.), 82'

Melløs Stadion, Melløs
Referee: Harald Lechner (Austria)

3 May 2011
17:00

Moldova	0–2	Wales
	Report	Walsh 36'; Jones 88'

Sarpsborg Stadion, Sarpsborg
Referee: Miroslav Zelinka (Czech Republic)

== Group 7 ==
Team	Pld	W	D	L	GF	GA	GD	Pts
Turkey	3	3	0	0	10	2	+8	9
Germany	3	2	0	1	8	1	+7	6
Hungary	3	1	0	2	5	11	−6	3
Macedonia	3	0	0	3	3	12	−9	0

31 May 2011
16:00

Germany	3–0	Hungary
Leitner 16'; Durm 57', 67'	Report

World of Wonders Football Centre, Antalya
Referee: Alain Bieri (Switzerland)

31 May 2011
19:00

Turkey	3–1	Macedonia
Demir 59', 64', 85'	Report	Gjurgjević 16'

World of Wonders Football Centre, Antalya
Referee: Sergii Boiko (Ukraine)

2 June 2011
16:00

Germany	5–0	Macedonia
Leitner 18' (pen.), 45+1' (pen.), 85'; Parker 66', 82'	Report

World of Wonders Football Centre, Antalya
Referee: Alain Bieri (Switzerland)

2 June 2011
19:00

Hungary	1–6	Turkey
Ugrai 46'	Report	Demir 2', 76'; Dere 6'; Şahiner 44', 90'; Bekdemir 90+3'

World of Wonders Football Centre, Antalya
Referee: Marius Avram (Romania)

5 June 2011
19:00

Turkey	1–0	Germany
Demir 22'	Report

World of Wonders Football Centre, Antalya
Referee: Marius Avram (Romania)

5 June 2011
19:00

Macedonia	2–4	Hungary
Naumchevski 26'; Timov 72'	Report	Skriba 34' (pen.), 53' (pen.); Szolnoki 71'; Nagy 90'

World Wonder Football Centre 2, Antalya
Referee: Sergii Boiko (Ukraine)

== Qualified nations ==
Country	Qualified as	Previous appearances in tournament^{1}
Romania	Hosts	**0** (debut)
Belgium	Group 1 winner	**3** (2002, 2004, 2006)
Spain	Group 2 winner	**7** (**2002**, **2004**, **2006**, **2007**, 2008, 2009, 2010)
Greece	Group 3 winner	**3** (2005, 2007, 2008)
Republic of Ireland	Group 4 winner	**1** (2002)
Czech Republic	Group 5 winner	**4** (2002, 2003, 2006, 2008)
Serbia	Group 6 winner	**3** (2005, 2007, 2009)
Turkey	Group 7 winner	**3** (2004, 2006, 2009)

^{1} Only counted appearances for under-19 era (bold indicates champion for that year, while italic indicates hosts)
