= 2011 UEFA European Under-19 Championship qualification =

Football tournament qualifying stage

The qualifying round of the 2011 UEFA U-19 Championship was the first of two qualifying rounds for the finals tournament of the 2011 UEFA European Under-19 Championship. During these rounds, 52 national teams competed to determine the seven teams that will join the already qualified host nation Romania.

The first qualifying round was played between 28 September and 30 October 2010. The 52 teams were divided into 13 groups of four teams, with each group being contested as a mini-tournament, hosted by one of the group's teams. After all matches have been played, the 13 group winners and 13 group runners-up advanced to the Elite Round. Alongside the 26 qualifying teams, the two best third-placed teams also qualified.

== Groups ==
=== Group 1 ===
Team	Pld	W	D	L	GF	GA	GD	Pts
Turkey	3	2	1	0	10	5	+5	7
Wales (H)	3	1	2	0	6	5	+1	5
Iceland	3	1	0	2	6	4	+2	3
Kazakhstan	3	0	1	2	2	10	−8	1

(H) Hosts
20 October 2010
18:00

Turkey	3–3	Wales
Bekdemir 7'; Özbek 59'; Demir 61'	Report	Holloway 57'; Bradshaw 90+1'; Matthews 90+4' (pen.)

Richmond Park, Carmarthen
Referee: Radek Matějek (Czech Republic)

20 October 2010
18:00

Iceland	4–0	Kazakhstan
Finsen 13', 61'; Yeoman 24'; Thorarinsson 33' (pen.)	Report

Stebonheath Park, Llanelli
Referee: Hubert Siejewicz (Poland)

22 October 2010
18:00

Turkey	5–1	Kazakhstan
Bekdemir 44', 82'; Şahiner 47'; Gülle 51'; Sarı 58'	Report	Baitana 38'

Brewery Field, Bridgend
Referee: Hubert Siejewicz (Poland)

22 October 2010
18:00

Wales	2–1	Iceland
Bodin 56' (pen.); Chamberlain 80'	Report	Thorarinsson 35' (pen.)

Stebonheath Park, Llanelli
Referee: Gerhard Grobelnik (Austria)

25 October 2010
18:00

Iceland	1–2	Turkey
Emilsson 48'	Report	Demir 57'; Sarı 90+4'

Richmond Park, Carmarthen
Referee: Radek Matějek (Czech Republic)

25 October 2010
18:00

Kazakhstan	1–1	Wales
Sariyev 67'	Report	Chamberlain 51'

Brewery Field, Bridgend
Referee: Gerhard Grobelnik (Austria)

=== Group 2 ===
Team	Pld	W	D	L	GF	GA	GD	Pts
Estonia (H)	3	2	0	1	6	2	+4	6
Norway	3	2	0	1	9	4	+5	6
Scotland	3	2	0	1	11	5	+6	6
Liechtenstein	3	0	0	3	0	15	−15	0

(H) Hosts
28 September 2010
12:00

Scotland	7–0	Liechtenstein
Brennan 31'; Keatings 42', 55', 67' (pen.); McGregor 61'; McGeouch 89'; Hilson 90+1'	Report

Rakvere Linnastaadion, Rakvere
Referee: Jan Jílek (Czech Republic)

28 September 2010
15:30

Norway	0–2	Estonia
	Report	Belov 40', 56'

Kadrioru Stadium, Tallinn
Referee: Ovidiu Alin Hategan (Romania)

30 September 2010
12:00

Liechtenstein	0–5	Norway
	Report	Valsvik 21'; Nielsen 28'; Bakenga 42', 61', 66'

Rakvere Linnastaadion, Rakvere
Referee: Hüseyin Göçek (Turkey)

30 September 2010
15:30

Scotland	2–1	Estonia
Hilson 37'; McGregor 47'	Report	Rättel 79'

Kadrioru Stadium, Tallinn
Referee: Jan Jílek (Czech Republic)

3 October 2010
15:30

Norway	4–2	Scotland
Gulbrandsen 20'; Hopen 48', 56', 77'	Report	Keatings 35' (pen.); Ødegaard 81' (o.g.)

Rakvere Linnastaadion, Rakvere
Referee: Hüseyin Göçek (Turkey)

3 October 2010
15:30

Estonia	3–0	Liechtenstein
Rättel 12', 50'; Luigend 25'	Report

Kadrioru Stadium, Tallinn
Referee: Ovidiu Alin Hategan (Romania)

=== Group 3 ===
Team	Pld	W	D	L	GF	GA	GD	Pts
Portugal	3	1	2	0	6	3	+3	5
Greece	3	1	1	1	2	2	0	4
Azerbaijan	3	1	1	1	5	3	+2	4
Georgia	3	1	0	2	1	6	−5	3

11 October 2010
17:00

Greece	0–1	Georgia
	Report	Okriashvili 89'

Municipal Stadium, Albufeira
Referee: Milorad Mažić (Serbia)

11 October 2010
17:00

Portugal	2–2	Azerbaijan
Pinto 78'; Bruma 87'	Report	Seyidov 28'; Isgandarov 48'

Municipal Stadium, Parchal
Referee: Tom Harald Hagen (Norway)

13 October 2010
17:00

Greece	1–0	Azerbaijan
Bougaidis 41'	Report

Estádio Fernando Cabrita, Lagos
Referee: Mario Vlk (Slovakia)

13 October 2010
17:00

Georgia	0–3	Portugal
	Report	Esgaio 23'; Betinho 35'; Bruma 61'

Estádio da Nora, Ferreiras
Referee: Milorad Mažić (Serbia)

16 October 2010
17:00

Portugal	1–1	Greece
Barros 7'	Report	Vellios 49'

Estádio Algarve, Faro
Referee: Tom Harald Hagen (Norway)

16 October 2010
17:00

Azerbaijan	3–0	Georgia
Gross 54'; Isgandarov 75', 79'	Report

Municipal Stadium, Parchal
Referee: Mario Vlk (Slovakia)

=== Group 4 ===
Team	Pld	W	D	L	GF	GA	GD	Pts
Ukraine	3	2	0	1	4	2	+2	6
Russia	3	2	0	1	7	5	+2	6
Denmark	3	2	0	1	5	3	+2	6
Sweden (H)	3	0	0	3	2	8	−6	0

(H) Hosts
7 October 2010
18:00

Russia	4–2	Sweden
Ivannikov 7'; Kozlov 54'; Kireyev 80'; Bocharov 90'	Report	Hiljemark 42', 60'

Ängelholms IP, Ängelholm
Referee: Richard Trutz (Slovakia)

7 October 2010
18:00

Ukraine	2–0	Denmark
Budkivskiy 33', 76'	Report

Harlyckans IP, Helsingborg
Referee: Alan Muir (Scotland)

9 October 2010
14:00

Sweden	0–1	Ukraine
	Report	Ordets 68'

Glänninge Park, Laholm
Referee: Richard Trutz (Slovakia)

9 October 2010
17:00

Russia	1–2	Denmark
Kozlov 63'	Report	Dumić 89'; Offenberg 90+3'

Ängelholms IP, Ängelholm
Referee: Albert Toussaint (Luxembourg)

12 October 2010
14:00

Ukraine	1–2	Russia
Karavayev 37'	Report	Nurov 57', 72'

Glänninge Park, Laholm
Referee: Albert Toussaint (Luxembourg)

12 October 2010
14:00

Denmark	3–0	Sweden
Andersén 5' (o.g.); Hvilsom 68', 90+1'	Report

Harlyckans IP, Helsingborg
Referee: Alan Muir (Scotland)

=== Group 5 ===
Team	Pld	W	D	L	GF	GA	GD	Pts
Belarus	3	2	0	1	5	4	+1	6
Macedonia	3	1	1	1	2	4	−2	4
Czech Republic	3	1	1	1	3	1	+2	4
Bosnia and Herzegovina (H)	3	0	2	1	2	3	−1	2

(H) Hosts
1 October 2010
15:00

Belarus	2–1	Bosnia and Herzegovina
Hlyabko 10'; Bombel 55'	Report	Seferovic 32'

Asim Ferhatović Hase Stadium, Sarajevo
Referee: Jérôme Efong Nzolo (Belgium)

1 October 2010
15:00

Czech Republic	0–1	Macedonia
	Report	Simonovski 50'

Stadion Grbavica, Sarajevo
Referee: Veaceslav Banari (Moldova)

3 October 2010
15:00

Belarus	3–0	Macedonia
Hlyabko 58'; Yevlash 75'; Shatalov 90'	Report

Asim Ferhatović Hase Stadium, Sarajevo
Referee: Nikolay Yordanov (Bulgaria)

3 October 2010
15:00

Bosnia and Herzegovina	0–0	Czech Republic
	Report

Stadion Grbavica, Sarajevo
Referee: Jérôme Efong Nzolo (Belgium)

6 October 2010
15:00

Czech Republic	3–0	Belarus
Krejčí 74'; Šustr 86'; Jeleček 90+1'	Report

Asim Ferhatović Hase Stadium, Sarajevo
Referee: Nikolay Yordanov (Bulgaria)

6 October 2010
15:00

Macedonia	1–1	Bosnia and Herzegovina
Huseinspahić 45' (o.g.)	Report	Seferovic 8'

Stadion Grbavica, Sarajevo
Referee: Veaceslav Banari (Moldova)

=== Group 6 ===
Team	Pld	W	D	L	GF	GA	GD	Pts
Hungary (H)	3	2	0	1	3	1	+2	6
Poland	3	1	1	1	2	2	0	4
Moldova	3	1	1	1	3	6	−3	4
Finland	3	1	0	2	6	5	+1	3

(H) Hosts
25 October 2010
14:30

Hungary	0–1	Moldova
	Report	Dima 45+1'

Városi Stadion, Tatabánya
Referee: Radek Příhoda (Czech Republic)

25 October 2010
14:30

Poland	2–0	Finland
Żyro 23'; Pietrzak 82'	Report

Globall Football Park, Telki
Referee: David Mckeon (Republic of Ireland)

27 October 2010
14:30

Hungary	1–0	Finland
Elek 43'	Report

Városi Stadion, Tatabánya
Referee: Richard Liesveld (Netherlands)

27 October 2010
14:30

Moldova	0–0	Poland
	Report

Globall Football Park, Telki
Referee: Radek Příhoda (Czech Republic)

30 October 2010
12:30

Poland	0–2	Hungary
	Report	Kovács 3'; Ponczók 4'

Városi Stadion, Tatabánya
Referee: Richard Liesveld (Netherlands)

30 October 2010
12:30

Finland	6–2	Moldova
Väyrynen 3'; Nieminen 42', 56'; Jenkinson 46'; Rexhepi 79'; Lehtonen 84'	Report	Rața 26', 60'

Globall Football Park, Telki
Referee: David Mckeon (Republic of Ireland)

=== Group 7 ===
Team	Pld	W	D	L	GF	GA	GD	Pts
Italy	3	3	0	0	8	2	+6	9
Croatia	3	1	1	1	5	6	−1	4
Latvia (H)	3	1	0	2	4	5	−1	3
Faroe Islands	3	0	1	2	3	7	−4	1

(H) Hosts
7 October 2010
13:00

Croatia	2–2	Faroe Islands
Jakoliš 42'; Mance 65'	Report	Sørensen 35'; Hansson 82'

Slokas Stadium, Jūrmala
Attendance: 100
Referee: Georgios Daloukas (Greece)

7 October 2010
18:00

Italy	2–1	Latvia
Carraro 11'; Verdi 71'	Report	Lonščakovs 52'

SB Arkādija, Riga
Attendance: 650
Referee: Jiří Jech (Czech Republic)

9 October 2010
13:00

Italy	3–0	Faroe Islands
De Vitis 22'; Libertazzi 54'; De Sciglio 60'	Report

Slokas Stadium, Jūrmala
Attendance: 150
Referee: Lasha Silagava (Georgia)

9 October 2010
18:00

Latvia	1–2	Croatia
Lonščakovs 16'	Report	Čulina 45+2'; Mance 87' (pen.)

SB Arkādija, Riga
Attendance: 600
Referee: Georgios Daloukas (Greece)

12 October 2010
13:00

Croatia	1–3	Italy
Mance 88'	Report	Bašić 9' (o.g.); Spezzani 21'; Libertazzi 85'

Slokas Stadium, Jūrmala
Attendance: 104
Referee: Jiří Jech (Czech Republic)

12 October 2010
13:00

Faroe Islands	1–2	Latvia
Sørensen 31'	Report	Omeļjanovičs 45+1' (pen.); Halimons 86'

SB Arkādija, Riga
Attendance: 300
Referee: Lasha Silagava (Georgia)

=== Group 8 ===
Team	Pld	W	D	L	GF	GA	GD	Pts
Belgium (H)	3	3	0	0	8	2	+6	9
England	3	2	0	1	11	3	+8	6
Cyprus	3	0	1	2	1	8	−7	1
Albania	3	0	1	2	1	8	−7	1

(H) Hosts
8 October 2010
14:30

England	6–1	Albania
McEachran 16'; Kane 18', 72'; Wickham 44'; Shelvey 78' (pen.); Afobe 88'	Report	Shkurtaj 76' (pen.)

Stade de la cité de l'oie, Visé
Referee: Andrejs Sipailo (Latvia)

8 October 2010
16:30

Belgium	4–1	Cyprus
Cerigioni 8', 64'; Lusala 62'; Hazard 68'	Report	Roushias 37'

Stade Jacques Lechat, Malmedy
Referee: Thomas Vejlgaard (Denmark)

10 October 2010
14:30

Cyprus	0–4	England
	Report	Afobe 4', 33', 74'; Shelvey 54'

Stade Jacques Lechat, Malmedy
Referee: Thomas Vejlgaard (Denmark)

10 October 2010
16:30

Belgium	2–0	Albania
Cerigioni 75'; Vermijl 83'	Report

Stade de Bielmont, Verviers
Referee: Sandor Szabo (Hungary)

13 October 2010
16:30

England	1–2	Belgium
Ngoo 86'	Report	M'Poku 45+6'; Van der Bruggen 88'

Stade de la cité de l'oie, Visé
Referee: Sandor Szabo (Hungary)

13 October 2010
16:30

Albania	0–0	Cyprus
	Report

Stade de Bielmont, Verviers
Referee: Andrejs Sipailo (Latvia)

=== Group 9 ===
Team	Pld	W	D	L	GF	GA	GD	Pts
Netherlands	3	3	0	0	7	0	+7	9
Slovakia	3	2	0	1	5	2	+3	6
Slovenia (H)	3	1	0	2	4	3	+1	3
Malta	3	0	0	3	0	11	−11	0

(H) Hosts
7 October 2010
15:00

Slovakia	4–0	Malta
Kamenčík 41'; Mikinič 45+1'; Škvarka 62'; Vrablec 90'	Report

Fazanerija stadium, Murska Sobota
Referee: Boško Jovanetić (Serbia)

7 October 2010
19:00

Netherlands	2–0	Slovenia
Lukoki 63'; Maher 90'	Report

Športni park Lendava, Lendava
Referee: Stuart Attwell (England)

9 October 2010
15:00

Netherlands	3–0	Malta
Isoufi 52'; Castaignos 55', 86'	Report

Športni park Lendava, Lendava
Referee: Boško Jovanetić (Serbia)

9 October 2010
15:00

Slovenia	0–1	Slovakia
	Report	Vilkovsky 90+2'

Fazanerija stadium, Murska Sobota
Referee: Tamás Bognar (Hungary)

12 October 2010
15:00

Slovakia	0–2	Netherlands
	Report	Martins Indi 3'; John 54'

Športni park Lendava, Lendava
Referee: Stuart Attwell (England)

12 October 2010
15:00

Malta	0–4	Slovenia
	Report	Stančič 7', 37'; Jelenič 33', 42'

Fazanerija stadium, Murska Sobota
Referee: Tamás Bognar (Hungary)

=== Group 10 ===
Team	Pld	W	D	L	GF	GA	GD	Pts
Serbia	3	3	0	0	7	0	+7	9
Republic of Ireland	3	2	0	1	7	2	+5	6
Bulgaria (H)	3	1	0	2	4	5	−1	3
Luxembourg	3	0	0	3	0	11	−11	0

(H) Hosts
7 October 2010
15:00

Republic of Ireland	5–0	Luxembourg
Brady 35' (pen.); McDonnell 37'; McGinty 45+1'; Rafter 80'; Walsh 90'	Report

Georgi Benkovski Stadium, Pazardzhik
Referee: Menashe Masiah (Israel)
7 October 2010
15:00

Serbia	3–0	Bulgaria
Brašanac 23'; Milunović 82'; Mrkela 90'	Report

Lokomotiv Stadium, Mezdra
Referee: Arman Amirkhanyan (Armenia)

9 October 2010
15:00

Republic of Ireland	2–1	Bulgaria
McGinty 48'; Brady 77'	Report	Amzin 40'

Georgi Benkovski Stadium, Pazardzhik
Referee: Artyom Kuchin (Kazakhstan)
9 October 2010
15:00

Luxembourg	0–3	Serbia
	Report	Milunović 31'; Despotović 35'; Stojiljković 75'

Lokomotiv Stadium, Mezdra
Referee: Menashe Masiah (Israel)

12 October 2010
15:00

Serbia	1–0	Republic of Ireland
Milunović 71'	Report

Georgi Benkovski Stadium, Pazardzhik
Referee: Arman Amirkhanyan (Armenia)
12 October 2010
15:00

Bulgaria	3–0	Luxembourg
Milanov 12'; Pochanski 45'; Kapitanov 78' (pen.)	Report

Lokomotiv Stadium, Mezdra
Referee: Artyom Kuchin (Kazakhstan)

=== Group 11 ===
Team	Pld	W	D	L	GF	GA	GD	Pts
Spain	3	3	0	0	12	0	+12	9
Israel	3	2	0	1	4	3	+1	6
Armenia	3	1	0	2	1	6	−5	3
Lithuania (H)	3	0	0	3	0	8	−8	0

(H) Hosts
19 October 2010
12:30

Israel	3–0	Armenia
Agayov 2'; Micha 5'; Amar 85'	Report

Sūduva Stadium, Marijampolė
Referee: Boško Jovanetić (Serbia)

19 October 2010
15:00

Spain	6–0	Lithuania
Morata 4'; Isco 15', 29'; Vikaitis 17' (o.g.); Sarabia 61', 84'	Report

Sūduva Stadium, Marijampolė
Referee: Anders Hermansen (Denmark)

21 October 2010
12:30

Spain	3–0	Armenia
Morata 15', 52'; Sarabia 53'	Report

Sūduva Stadium, Marijampolė
Referee: Fırat Aydınus (Turkey)

21 October 2010
15:00

Lithuania	0–1	Israel
	Report	Yair 26'

Sūduva Stadium, Marijampolė
Referee: Boško Jovanetić (Serbia)

24 October 2010
14:00

Israel	0–3	Spain
	Report	Sarabia 48'; Isco 71', 79'

Sūduva Stadium, Marijampolė
Referee: Anders Hermansen (Denmark)

24 October 2010
14:00

Armenia	1–0	Lithuania
Manucharyan 65'	Report

Sūduva Stadium, Marijampolė
Referee: Fırat Aydınus (Turkey)

=== Group 12 ===
Team	Pld	W	D	L	GF	GA	GD	Pts
France	3	3	0	0	6	0	+6	9
Montenegro	3	1	1	1	6	3	+3	4
Austria (H)	3	1	1	1	5	2	+3	4
San Marino	3	0	0	3	0	12	−12	0

(H) Hosts
8 October 2010
15:30

France	3–0	San Marino
Derouard 21'; Saadi 66'; Mignon 90+2'	Report

Sportzentrum Seekirchen, Seekirchen
Referee: Vassilios Pamporidis (Greece)

8 October 2010
18:30

Austria	1–1	Montenegro
Offenbacher 22'	Report	Mugoša 39'

Untersberg-Arena, Grödig
Referee: Viktor Shvetsov (Ukraine)

10 October 2010
13:00

France	2–0	Montenegro
Kebano 17'; Derouard 42'	Report

Untersberg-Arena, Grödig
Referee: Viktor Shvetsov (Ukraine)

10 October 2010
16:00

San Marino	0–4	Austria
	Report	Zulj 11', 53'; Offenbacher 36'; Aschauer 69'

Sportzentrum Seekirchen, Seekirchen
Referee: Lars Christoffersen (Denmark)

13 October 2010
18:30

Austria	0–1	France
	Report	Belfodil 26'

Untersberg-Arena, Grödig
Referee: Lars Christoffersen (Denmark)

13 October 2010
18:30

Montenegro	5–0	San Marino
Mugoša 17', 57'; Pržica 34'; Vukčević 66', 89'	Report

Sportzentrum Seekirchen, Seekirchen
Referee: Vassilios Pamporidis (Greece)

=== Group 13 ===
Team	Pld	W	D	L	GF	GA	GD	Pts
Germany (H)	3	2	1	0	14	3	+11	7
Switzerland	3	1	2	0	8	2	+6	5
Northern Ireland	3	1	1	1	3	3	0	4
Andorra	3	0	0	3	1	18	−17	0

(H) Hosts
8 October 2010
11:00

Germany	10–0	Andorra
Volland 36', 66', 85', 90'; Thy 44', 78'; Leitner 60', 71'; Mustafi 68'; Ferreira 82' (o.g.)	Report

Hardtwaldstadion, Sandhausen
Referee: Mattias Gestranius (Finland)

8 October 2010
15:00

Switzerland	0–0	Northern Ireland
	Report

Sportzentrum Süd, Heidelberg
Referee: Olivier Thual (France)

10 October 2010
13:05

Germany	2–1	Northern Ireland
Leitner 59'; Mustafi 90+3'	Report	McAlinden 87'

Dietmar-Hopp-Stadion, Sinsheim
Referee: Mattias Gestranius (Finland)

10 October 2010
15:30

Andorra	0–6	Switzerland
	Report	Charrua 1' (o.g.); Benito 18'; Seferovic 29', 70'; Mijatović 42'; Freuler 71'

Waldseestadion, Forst
Referee: Nikola Dabanović (Montenegro)

13 October 2010
17:00

Switzerland	2–2	Germany
Xhaka 14'; Rodríguez 35' (pen.)	Report	Kachunga 19', 70'

Carl-Benz-Stadion, Mannheim
Referee: Olivier Thual (France)

13 October 2010
17:00

Northern Ireland	2–1	Andorra
McAlinden 45'; Gray 90+5'	Report	Marinho 60'

Hardtwaldstadion, Sandhausen
Referee: Nikola Dabanović (Montenegro)

=== Ranking of third-placed teams ===
Ranking includes only matches against group winners and runners-up. The top two, Moldova and the Czech Republic, advanced to the Elite Round.

Grp	Team	Pld	W	D	L	GF	GA	GD	Pts
6	Moldova	2	1	1	0	1	0	+1	4
5	Czech Republic	2	1	0	1	3	1	+2	3
2	Scotland	2	1	0	1	4	5	−1	3
4	Denmark	2	1	0	1	2	3	−1	3
3	Azerbaijan	2	0	1	1	2	3	−1	1
12	Austria	2	0	1	1	1	2	−1	1
13	Northern Ireland	2	0	1	1	1	2	−1	1
1	Iceland	2	0	0	2	2	4	−2	0
7	Latvia	2	0	0	2	2	4	−2	0
9	Slovenia	2	0	0	2	0	3	−3	0
10	Bulgaria	2	0	0	2	1	5	−4	0
11	Armenia	2	0	0	2	0	6	−6	0
8	Cyprus	2	0	0	2	1	8	−7	0
