= 2011 UEFA European Under-19 Championship =

Campionatul European de Fotbal sub 19 ani 2011

Tournament details
- Host country: Romania
- Dates: 20 July – 1 August
- Teams: 8 (from 1 confederation)

Final positions
- Champions: Spain (8th title)
- Runners-up: Czech Republic

Tournament statistics
- Matches played: 15
- Goals scored: 46 (3.07 per match)
- Top scorer(s): (Spain) Álvaro Morata (6 goals)
- Best player: (Spain) Álex

The 2011 UEFA European Under-19 Championship was the tenth edition of UEFA's European Under-19 Championship since it was renamed from the original under-18 event, in 2001. The tournament took place in Romania from 20 July to 1 August 2011. France were the title holders, but failed to qualify for the finals. Spain won the tournament.

== Qualification ==
Qualification for the final tournament was played over two stages:

- Qualification – 28 September 2010 – 30 October 2010
- Elite qualification – 28 April 2011 – 5 June 2011

The final tournament of the Championship was preceded by two qualification stages: a qualifying round and an Elite round. During these rounds, 52 national teams competed to determine the seven teams that would join the already qualified host nation Romania.

The qualifying round was played between 28 September and 30 October 2010. The 52 teams were divided into 13 groups of four teams, with each group being contested as a mini-tournament hosted by one of the group's teams. After all matches were played, the 13 group winners and 13 group runners-up advanced to the Elite round. Alongside the 26 winner and runner-up teams, the two best third-placed teams also qualified.

The following teams qualified for the tournament

- Belgium
- Czech Republic
- Greece
- Republic of Ireland
- Romania (host)
- Serbia
- Spain
- Turkey

== Venues ==
The tournament venues will all be located in Ilfov County, near the capital Bucharest, at already existing stadiums in four locations (one town and three communes).

Location	Stadium	Capacity	Notes
Berceni	Stadionul Berceni	2,600	Three group matches
Buftea	Stadionul CNAF	800	Three group matches
Chiajna	Stadionul Concordia	3,700	Three group games, a semifinal and the final
Mogoșoaia	Stadionul Mogoșoaia	1,000	Three group matches and a semifinal

== Group stage ==
The draw was held in Bucharest on 8 June 2011, when hosts Romania and the seven elite-round qualifiers divided into two groups of four.

Each group winner and runner-up advanced to the semi-finals.

Tie-break criteria for teams even on points:

- Higher number of points obtained in the group matches played among the teams in question
- Superior goal difference resulting from the group matches played among the teams in question
- Higher number of goals scored in the group matches played among the teams in question
- If, after having applied the above criteria, two teams still have an equal ranking, the same criteria will be reapplied to determine the final ranking of the two teams. If this procedure does not lead to a decision, the following criteria will apply:
  - Results of all group matches:
    - Superior goal difference
    - Higher number of goals scored
  - Fair play ranking of the teams in question
  - Drawing of lots
- If two teams which have the same number of points and the same number of goals scored and conceded play their last group match against each other and are still equal at the end of that match, their final rankings will be determined by kicks from the penalty mark and not by the criteria listed above

All times are Eastern European Summer Time (UTC+3)

Legend
Advanced to semifinals

=== Group A ===
Team	Pld	W	D	L	GF	GA	GD	Pts
Czech Republic	3	3	0	0	6	2	+4	9
Republic of Ireland	3	1	1	1	3	3	0	4
Greece	3	1	0	2	2	3	−1	3
Romania	3	0	1	2	1	4	−3	1

20 July 2011
21:00

Greece	1–2	Republic of Ireland
Katidis 5'	Report	O'Connor 2', 51'

Stadionul Buftea, Buftea
Attendance: 310
Referee: Pawel Gil (Poland)
20 July 2011
21:00

Romania	1–3	Czech Republic
Stanciu 30'	Report	Přikryl 44'; Jeleček 61' (pen.); Jánoš 85'

Stadionul Concordia, Chiajna
Attendance: 3,550
Referee: Clément Turpin (France)

23 July 2011
19:00

Czech Republic	2–1	Republic of Ireland
Brabec 69'; Lácha 71'	Report	O'Sullivan 10'

Stadionul Mogoșoaia, Mogoșoaia
Attendance: 337
Referee: Tamás Bognár (Hungary)
23 July 2011
21:00

Romania	0–1	Greece
	Report	Fortounis 37'

Stadionul Berceni, Berceni
Attendance: 2,550
Referee: Stuart Attwell (England)

26 July 2011
19:00

Czech Republic	1–0	Greece
Přikryl 70'	Report

Stadionul Mogoșoaia, Mogoșoaia
Attendance: 325
Referee: Tom Harald Hagen (Norway)
26 July 2011
19:00

Republic of Ireland	0–0	Romania
	Report

Stadionul Berceni, Berceni
Attendance: 2,470
Referee: Artyom Kuchin (Kazakhstan)

=== Group B ===
Team	Pld	W	D	L	GF	GA	GD	Pts
Spain	3	2	0	1	8	4	+4	6
Serbia	3	1	1	1	3	5	−2	4
Turkey	3	1	1	1	4	3	+1	4
Belgium	3	0	2	1	3	6	−3	2

20 July 2011
19:00

Serbia	2–0	Turkey
Jojić 57'; Trujić 89'	Report

Stadionul Berceni, Berceni
Attendance: 2,160
Referee: Artyom Kuchin (Kazakhstan)
21 July 2011
18:00

Spain	4–1	Belgium
Sarabia 15' (pen.); Alcácer 65'; Muñiz 90+1'; Morata 90+3'	Report	Cuvelier 46'

Stadionul Mogoșoaia, Mogoșoaia
Attendance: 750
Referee: Stuart Attwell (England)

The match was scheduled to be played on 20 July, but was abandoned after 15 minutes due to adverse weather conditions while Spain was leading 1–0 after a goal from Álvaro Morata. It was replayed on 21 July at 18:00 local time.

23 July 2011
19:00

Turkey	1–1	Belgium
Ali 77'	Report	Vervaeke 90'

Stadionul Buftea, Buftea
Attendance: 193
Referee: Tom Harald Hagen (Norway)
23 July 2011
21:00

Serbia	0–4	Spain
	Report	Morata 13', 22', 75'; Juanmi 15'

Stadionul Concordia, Chiajna
Attendance: 818
Referee: Pawel Gil (Poland)

26 July 2011
21:00

Turkey	3–0	Spain
Ramalho 31' (o.g.); Çörekçi 51'; Gómez 56' (o.g.)	Report

Stadionul Concordia, Chiajna
Attendance: 1,887
Referee: Tamás Bognár (Hungary)
26 July 2011
21:00

Belgium	1–1	Serbia
Vermijl 73'	Report	Mrkela 6'

Stadionul Buftea, Buftea
Attendance: 172
Referee: Clément Turpin (France)

== Knockout stage ==
=== Bracket ===
Semi-finals
29 July – Mogoșoaia
Czech Republic	4
Serbia	2
29 July – Chiajna
Spain	5
Republic of Ireland	0

Final
1 August – Chiajna
Czech Republic	2
Spain	3

=== Semifinals ===
29 July 2011
18:45

Czech Republic	4–2	Serbia
Přikryl 6'; Kalas 16'; Jeleček 19' (pen.); Skalák 90+2'	Report	Despotović 23', 28'

Stadionul Mogoșoaia, Mogoșoaia
Attendance: 450
Referee: Artyom Kuchin (Kazakhstan)

29 July 2011
20:45

Spain	5–0	Republic of Ireland
Deulofeu 27'; Sarabia 40'; Juanmi 46'; Morata 79', 90+1' (pen.)	Report

Stadionul Concordia, Chiajna
Attendance: 2,768
Referee: Clément Turpin (France)

=== Final ===
1 August 2011
20:00

Czech Republic	2–3 (a.e.t.)	Spain
Krejčí 52'; Lácha 97'	Report	Aurtenetxe 84'; Alcácer 107', 115'

Stadionul Concordia, Chiajna
Attendance: 4,300
Referee: Stuart Attwell (England)

Czech Republic
GK	1	Tomáš Koubek
DF	2	Jakub Brabec (c) (yellow card) 69'
MF	4	Adam Jánoš
DF	5	Tomáš Kalas
DF	6	Pavel Kadeřábek
FW	9	Jiří Skalák (yellow card) 66' (substituted off) 79'
DF	12	Tomáš Jeleček
MF	13	Ladislav Krejčí
FW	14	Tomáš Přikryl (substituted off) 102'
MF	17	Martin Hála
DF	18	Roman Polom (substituted off) 36'
Substitutes
GK	16	Jakub Zapletal
DF	3	Jakub Jugas
MF	7	Martin Kraus
MF	8	Martin Sladký (substituted on) 36'
FW	10	Antonín Fantiš (substituted on) 102' (yellow card) 107'
DF	11	Patrik Lácha (substituted on) 79'
FW	15	Vojtěch Hadaščok
Manager
(Czech Republic) Jaroslav Hřebík

Spain
GK	1	Edgar Badia
DF	3	Sergi Gómez
DF	4	Ignasi Miquel
DF	5	Jon Aurtenetxe
MF	6	Rubén Pardo
FW	7	Álvaro Morata
MF	8	Álex (yellow card) 47' (substituted off) 55'
MF	10	Pablo Sarabia (c) (substituted off) 78'
DF	12	Albert Blázquez
FW	15	Juanmi (substituted off) 54'
MF	17	Gerard Deulofeu
Substitutes
GK	13	Adrián Ortolá
DF	2	Dani Carvajal
FW	9	Borja
FW	11	Paco Alcácer (substituted on) 54'
DF	14	Jonás Ramalho
MF	16	José Campaña (substituted on) 55' (yellow card) 119'
MF	18	Juan Muñiz (substituted on) 78'
Manager
(Spain) Ginés Meléndez

Assistant referees
(Russia) Dmitri Mosyakin
(Denmark) Lars Hummelgaard
Fourth official
(Kazakhstan) Artyom Kuchin

== Goalscorers ==
6 goals

- (Spain) Álvaro Morata

3 goals

- (Czech Republic) Tomáš Přikryl
- (Spain) Paco Alcácer

2 goals

- (Czech Republic) Tomáš Jeleček
- (Czech Republic) Patrik Lácha
- (Republic of Ireland) Anthony O'Connor
- (Serbia) Djordje Despotović
- (Spain) Juanmi
- (Spain) Pablo Sarabia

1 goal

- (Belgium) Florent Cuvelier
- (Belgium) Marnick Vermijl
- (Belgium) Jonas Vervaeke
- (Czech Republic) Jakub Brabec
- (Czech Republic) Adam Jánoš
- (Czech Republic) Tomáš Kalas
- (Czech Republic) Ladislav Krejčí
- (Czech Republic) Jiří Skalák
- (Greece) Kostas Fortounis
- (Greece) Giorgos Katidis
- (Republic of Ireland) John O'Sullivan
- (Romania) Nicolae Stanciu
- (Serbia) Miloš Jojić
- (Serbia) Andrej Mrkela
- (Serbia) Nikola Trujić
- (Spain) Jon Aurtenetxe
- (Spain) Gerard Deulofeu
- (Spain) Juan Muñiz
- (Turkey) Kamil Çörekçi
- (Turkey) Ali Dere

1 own goal

- (Spain) Sergi Gómez (playing against Turkey)
- (Spain) Jonás Ramalho (playing against Turkey)

== Team of the Tournament ==
After the final, the UEFA technical team selected 23 players to integrate the "team of the tournament".

Goalkeepers

- (Czech Republic) Tomáš Koubek
- (Greece) Stefanos Kapino
- (Spain) Édgar Badía

Defenders

- (Belgium) Pierre-Yves Ngawa
- (Czech Republic) Jakub Brabec
- (Czech Republic) Tomáš Jeleček
- (Czech Republic) Tomáš Kalas
- (Spain) Dani Carvajal
- (Spain) Sergi Gómez
- (Spain) Ignasi Miquel

Midfielders

- (Czech Republic) Adam Jánoš
- (Czech Republic) Pavel Kadeřábek
- (Czech Republic) Ladislav Krejčí
- (Greece) Kostas Fortounis
- (Republic of Ireland) Jeff Hendrick
- (Spain) Rubén Pardo
- (Spain) Pablo Sarabia
- (Turkey) Orhan Gülle

Forwards

- (Czech Republic) Tomáš Přikryl
- (Greece) Charis Mavrias
- (Romania) Ionuț Năstăsie
- (Serbia) Andrej Mrkela
- (Spain) Paco Alcácer
- (Spain) Gerard Deulofeu
- (Spain) Álvaro Morata
