= Gerard Deulofeu =

Spanish footballer (born 1994)

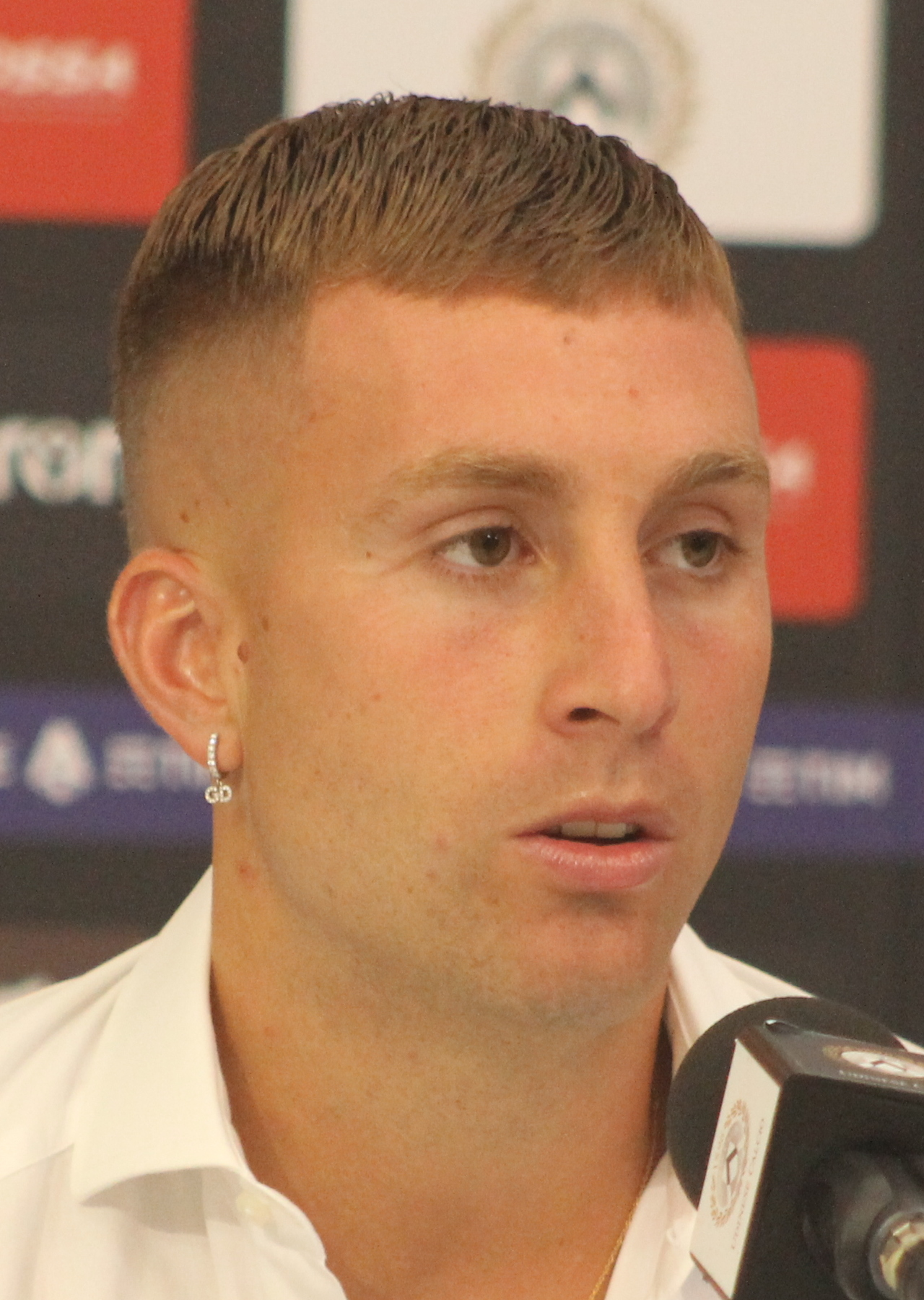
- Deulofeu with Udinese in 2023

Personal information
- Full name: Gerard Deulofeu Lázaro
- Date of birth: 13 March 1994 (age 32)
- Place of birth: Riudarenes, Spain
- Height: 1.77 m (5 ft 10 in)
- Positions: Forward; winger

Youth career
- 2001–2003: Penya Bons Aires
- 2003–2011: Barcelona

Senior career*
| Years | Team | Apps | (Gls) |
| 2011–2013 | Barcelona B | 68 | (27) |
| 2011–2015 | Barcelona | 2 | (0) |
| 2013–2014 | → Everton (loan) | 26 | (3) |
| 2014–2015 | → Sevilla (loan) | 17 | (1) |
| 2015–2017 | Everton | 39 | (3) |
| 2017 | → AC Milan (loan) | 17 | (4) |
| 2017–2018 | Barcelona | 10 | (1) |
| 2018 | → Watford (loan) | 6 | (1) |
| 2018–2021 | Watford | 58 | (14) |
| 2020–2021 | → Udinese (loan) | 8 | (0) |
| 2021–2025 | Udinese | 55 | (16) |
| Total | | 304 | (69) |

International career
| 2009–2010 | Spain U16 | 4 | (1) |
| 2009–2011 | Spain U17 | 21 | (6) |
| 2011–2012 | Spain U19 | 19 | (5) |
| 2013 | Spain U20 | 7 | (3) |
| 2012–2017 | Spain U21 | 36 | (17) |
| 2014–2017 | Spain | 4 | (1) |
| 2014–2022 | Catalonia | 2 | (3) |
Medal record
Representing Spain
Men's football
UEFA European Under-21 Championship
| Runner-up | 2017 Poland | Team |
UEFA European Under-19 Championship
| Winner | 2012 Estonia | Team |
| Winner | 2011 Romania | Team |
UEFA European Under-17 Championship
| Runner-up | 2010 Liechtenstein | Team |
- * Club domestic league appearances and goals as of 15:37, 12 November 2022 (UTC)

Gerard Deulofeu Lázaro (Spanish: [ɟʝeˈɾaɾ ðewloˈfew ˈlaθaɾo]; (Note: In isolation, Deulofeu is pronounced [dewloˈfew].) born 13 March 1994) is a Spanish professional footballer who plays as a forward or winger.

He started his career with local Catalan side Barcelona, first appearing with the first team at the age of 17, and was loaned to Everton and Sevilla before joining the former on a permanent deal in the summer of 2015. After a successful loan spell at Italian side AC Milan, he was brought back to Barcelona in June 2017, before being loaned to English club Watford in January 2018; later that year, Watford signed him outright. He then returned to Italy, joining fellow club Udinese on loan in October 2020, signing permanently for the club in January of the following year.

Deulofeu is a former Spanish youth international, having represented the country over 80 times at under-16, under-17, under-19, under-20 and under-21 levels, being named the UEFA Under-19 Championship Golden Player in 2012. In 2014, he made his senior debut for the Spain national team.

== Club career ==
=== Barcelona ===
Born in Riudarenes, Girona, Catalonia, Deulofeu joined Barcelona's youth academy in 2003 at the age of nine. In 2005, he was promoted to the U-13 team. On 2 March 2011, still registered with the junior team, he made his senior debut, appearing for the B team in a 4–1 away win against Córdoba in Segunda División by coming on as a substitute for Edu Oriol in the 75th minute.

In late April 2011, Deulofeu was called up to the senior squad for the first time, for a La Liga match against Real Sociedad on 29 April, but did not leave the bench in a 2–1 away loss. On 29 October, he made his professional debut with the main squad, replacing Cesc Fàbregas in the 63rd minute of a 5–0 league home success against Mallorca.

On 16 September 2012, Deulofeu scored his first goal for the B team, in a 2–1 away loss at Hércules. Deulofeu scored 18 goals for the B team in the 2012–13 season, joint-fourth in the second level competition. On 15 May 2013, he signed a professional contract with the Blaugrana first team, running until June 2017.

==== Everton (loan) ====
On 10 July 2013, Premier League club Everton signed Deulofeu on a season-long loan. The Liverpool Echo also reported that any loan fee would be waived if he made appearances in more than 50% of his new club's games. He scored on his debut for his new club, a 2–1 home win over Stevenage in the second round of the League Cup on 29 August.

On 30 November, Deulofeu scored his first league goal for the Toffees, netting the opener in a 4–0 home success against Stoke City. His second came eight days later, through an 85th-minute strike at Arsenal to earn a 1–1 draw.

On 14 December 2013, Deulofeu suffered a hamstring injury during Everton's 4–1 victory over Fulham, which sidelined him for five weeks. He scored his third and last goal on 15 March of the following year, netting the opener in a 2–1 home win over Cardiff City. He helped his team to record its best ever Premier League points tally of 72 to finish fifth and, at the end of the campaign, Barcelona confirmed that he would not be returning for a second loan spell as he had been promoted to their first-team squad; he wrote an open letter thanking the staff, players and fans for their support during his stay.

==== Sevilla (loan) ====
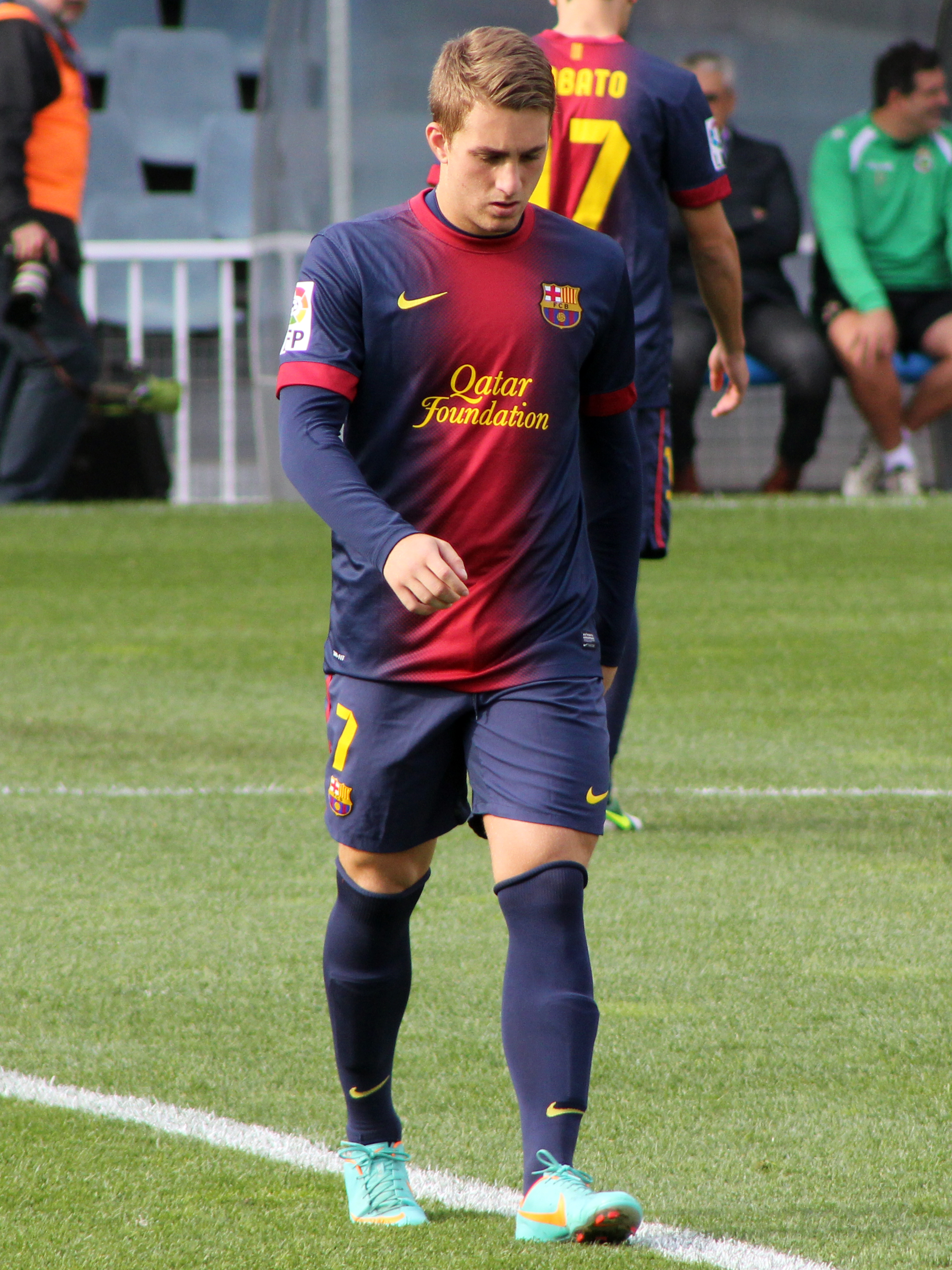
Deulofeu playing for Barcelona B in 2012

In May 2014, Deulofeu was granted a first-team place by new Barcelona manager Luis Enrique. However, on 14 August 2014, Sevilla reached an agreement with Barcelona for the loan of Deulofeu for the coming season, with the player admitting "surprise" at Enrique's decision.

After being an unused substitute in a 1–1 home draw against Valencia, Deulofeu made his debut on 30 August replacing Vitolo in the 73rd minute of a 2–1 away win against Espanyol. He made his UEFA Europa League debut on 18 September, starting and providing assists for both goals in a 2–0 home victory against Feyenoord.

On 24 September Deulofeu scored his first goal for the Andalusians (and also his first ever in the top flight in Spain), netting the game's winner in a home success over Real Sociedad. His loan was considered hugely unsuccessful, the Spanish newspaper Marca selected him in their La Liga 'Worst team of the season'.

=== Everton ===
Deulofeu joined Everton permanently on 1 July 2015, for a transfer fee reported to be £4.2 million. He scored his first goal as a permanent Everton player, a free kick at the Madejski Stadium, as they came from behind to win 2–1 against Reading in the third round of the League Cup. His first league goal since his transfer came on 1 November, the opening goal in a 6–2 rout of Sunderland.

==== AC Milan (loan) ====
On 23 January 2017, Deulofeu joined AC Milan on loan until the end of the 2016–17 season. Two days later, he made his debut with Milan in a Coppa Italia quarter-final match against Juventus, coming on as a substitute for Carlos Bacca in the 1–2 defeat. On 29 January, he made his league debut as a substitute for the injured Giacomo Bonaventura in a loss by the same score against Udinese. On 8 February, Deulofeu made his first assist, a low pass across the goalmouth towards Mario Pašalić, in a 0–1 away victory against Bologna, and 11 days later he scored his first goal for the Rossoneri in a 2–1 victory against Fiorentina at the San Siro.

=== Return to Barcelona ===
On 30 June 2017, Deulofeu returned to Barcelona, as the club activated their buy-back clause for him. On 21 October, he scored his first goal for the club as he scored the opener in the 2nd minute in a 2–0 win against Málaga.

=== Watford ===
On 29 January 2018, it was announced that Deulofeu was to join English Premier League side Watford on a loan deal until the end of the season. On 5 February 2018, he scored his first goal for the Hornets in a Premier League 4–1 win against Chelsea.

On 11 June 2018, Watford signed Deulofeu on a permanent deal for a reported fee of €13 million. He was sidelined from the last game of his loan spell until being available for selection again in early October, owing to "foot and hip problems".

On 22 February 2019, Deulofeu became the first Watford player to score a Premier League hat-trick, scoring three goals in a 5–1 win over Cardiff City.

=== Udinese ===
In October 2020, Deulofeu joined Udinese on a season-long loan from Watford for the remainder of the 2020–21 campaign. However, on 30 January 2021, midway through the season, he completed a permanent transfer to the club, signing a three-and-a-half-year contract, and subsequently departed Watford.

On 12 November 2022, Deulofeu suffered another anterior cruciate ligament injury in a Serie A match against Napoli, keeping him sidelined for months and as a result, required surgery. In January 2023, he received surgery for the injury, which unexpectedly infected his cartilage, setting him back even further from his recovery.

On 12 July 2023, Deulofeu signed a new three-year contract with Udinese until 2026. However, he had already missed the majority of the 2022–23 and later the 2023–24 season due to the injury, but continued recovering and training.

During the start of the 2024–25 season, he was still recovering from the injury, with Udinese supporting him through his recovery. On 16 January 2025, Udinese announced that they had amicably terminated Deulofeu's contract by mutual consent, having been two years out of action with his injury. The club stated that they would continue to support him through his recovery, and maintain a close relationship.

== International career ==
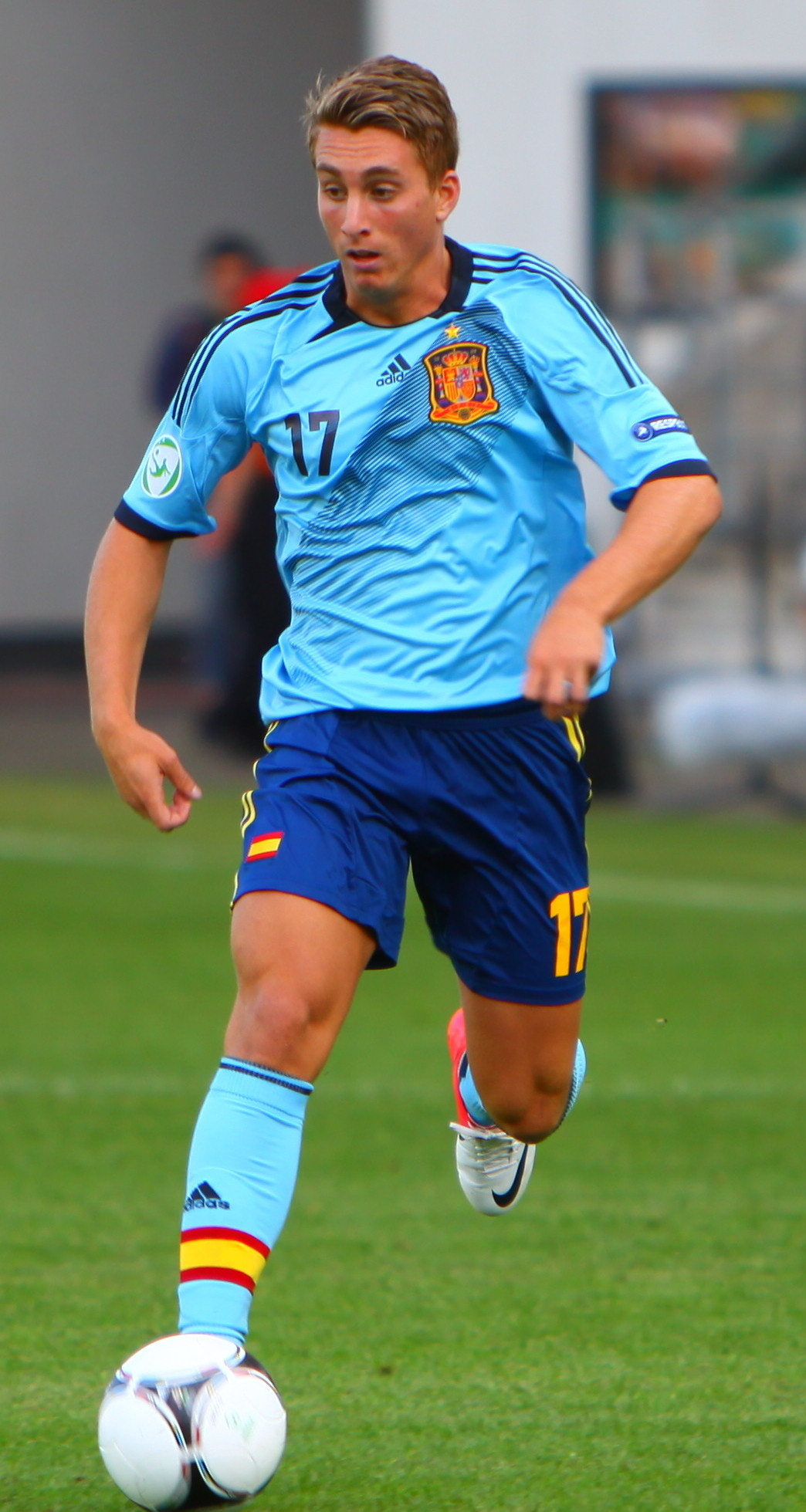
Deulofeu on the ball for Spain U19 at the 2012 UEFA European Under-19 Championship

Deulofeu played for the Spain under-17 team from 2009 to 2011, helping them finish runner-up at the 2010 UEFA European Under-17 Championship. In the latter year he was selected to the under-19s, winning two consecutive European Championships and being selected best player in the 2012 edition.

Deulofeu was selected for the senior side for the first time on 30 May 2014, as part of a 19-man squad to play a friendly against Bolivia, being given the number 7. He played the last ten minutes of the 2–0 win in Seville as a substitute for Pedro, but the following day he was not included in the squad for the 2014 FIFA World Cup.

On 12 November 2015, Deulofeu scored a hat-trick and captained the under-21 team in a 5–0 win over Georgia in Almería, for 2017 UEFA European Under-21 Championship qualification.

Winning his second senior Spain cap, Deulofeu scored his first goal for Spain against France in a friendly on 28 March 2017, after coming off the bench. While the goal was initially ruled offside, it was overturned by the video assistant referee. Deulofeu made two further appearances for Spain as a substitute in 2017, in a 2–2 friendly draw against Colombia and an 8–0 victory over Liechtenstein in 2018 FIFA World Cup qualification: the latter match marked Deulofeu's competitive international debut as well as his latest cap for Spain.

== Style of play ==
Deulofeu has gained a reputation as a quick and skillful player. His most notable strengths include pace, technique and dribbling ability. Deulofeu is capable of playing as a winger or as a forward on either flank. He is also capable of playing in a central role, seemingly operating as a lone striker, but acting instead as a false-9; he has even been deployed as an out-and-out striker on occasion, or more frequently as a second striker, due to his tendency to beat opponents in one on one situations and create chances for teammates, in addition to scoring goals himself. Despite citing Ronaldinho as his main inspiration, Deulofeu's style of play is comparable to that of Cristiano Ronaldo, due to a shared direct approach.

Regarded as a promising young player, in 2012, he was included by Don Balón in their list of the 101 most exciting prospects born after 1991, while in January 2014, he was named by The Observer as one of the ten most promising young players in Europe. Looking back in 2018, NBC Sports' Daniel Karell said of Deulofeu: "In his younger days, the [then] 24-year-old winger was a dynamic and lightning-quick attacker with a central midfielder's technique to boot".

== Career statistics ==
=== Club ===
As of match played 22 January 2023

Appearances and goals by club, season and competition
| Club | Season | League | | | National cup (Note: Includes Copa del Rey, FA Cup, Coppa Italia) | | League cup (Note: Includes Football League/EFL Cup) | | Europe | | Other | | Total | |
| Club | Season | Division | Apps | Goals | Apps | Goals | Apps | Goals | Apps | Goals | Apps | Goals | Apps | Goals |
|---|---|---|---|---|---|---|---|---|---|---|---|---|---|---|
| Barcelona B | 2010–11 | Segunda División | 1 | 0 | — | | — | | — | | — | | 1 | 0 |
| Barcelona B | 2011–12 | Segunda División | 34 | 9 | — | | — | | — | | — | | 34 | 9 |
| Barcelona B | 2012–13 | Segunda División | 33 | 18 | — | | — | | — | | — | | 33 | 18 |
| Barcelona B | Total | | 68 | 27 | — | | — | | — | | — | | 68 | 27 |
| Barcelona | 2011–12 | La Liga | 1 | 0 | 0 | 0 | — | | 1 (Note: Appearance(s) in UEFA Champions League) | 0 | — | | 2 | 0 |
| Barcelona | 2012–13 | La Liga | 1 | 0 | 1 | 0 | — | | 2 | 0 | — | | 4 | 0 |
| Barcelona | Total | | 2 | 0 | 1 | 0 | — | | 3 | 0 | — | | 6 | 0 |
| Everton (loan) | 2013–14 | Premier League | 25 | 3 | 2 | 0 | 2 | 1 | — | | — | | 29 | 4 |
| Sevilla (loan) | 2014–15 | La Liga | 17 | 1 | 6 | 2 | — | | 5 (Note: Appearances in UEFA Europa League) | 0 | — | | 28 | 3 |
| Everton | 2015–16 | Premier League | 26 | 2 | 1 | 0 | 6 | 2 | — | | — | | 33 | 4 |
| Everton | 2016–17 | Premier League | 11 | 0 | 1 | 0 | 1 | 0 | — | | — | | 13 | 0 |
| Everton | Total | | 62 | 5 | 4 | 0 | 9 | 3 | — | | — | | 75 | 8 |
| AC Milan (loan) | 2016–17 | Serie A | 17 | 4 | 1 | 0 | — | | — | | — | | 18 | 4 |
| Barcelona | 2017–18 | La Liga | 10 | 1 | 2 | 1 | — | | 3 | 0 | 2 (Note: Appearances in Supercopa de España) | 0 | 17 | 2 |
| Watford (loan) | 2017–18 | Premier League | 7 | 1 | 0 | 0 | 0 | 0 | — | | — | | 7 | 1 |
| Watford | 2018–19 | Premier League | 30 | 10 | 3 | 2 | 0 | 0 | — | | — | | 33 | 12 |
| Watford | 2019–20 | Premier League | 28 | 4 | 0 | 0 | 2 | 0 | — | | — | | 30 | 4 |
| Watford | Total | | 65 | 15 | 3 | 2 | 2 | 0 | — | | — | | 70 | 17 |
| Udinese | 2020–21 | Serie A | 13 | 1 | 2 | 1 | — | | — | | — | | 15 | 2 |
| Udinese | 2021–22 | Serie A | 34 | 13 | 1 | 0 | — | | — | | — | | 35 | 13 |
| Udinese | 2022–23 | Serie A | 16 | 2 | 2 | 1 | — | | — | | — | | 18 | 3 |
| Udinese | Total | | 63 | 16 | 5 | 2 | — | | — | | — | | 68 | 18 |
| Career total | | | 304 | 69 | 22 | 7 | 11 | 3 | 11 | 0 | 2 | 0 | 350 | 79 |

=== International ===
As of match played 5 September 2017

Appearances and goals by national team and year
| National team | Year | Apps | Goals |
|---|---|---|---|
Spain
| Spain | 2014 | 1 | 0 |
| Spain | 2015 | 0 | 0 |
| Spain | 2016 | 0 | 0 |
| Spain | 2017 | 3 | 1 |
| Total | | 4 | 1 |

Scores and results list Spain's goal tally first

List of international goals scored by Gerard Deulofeu
| No | Date | Venue | Opponent | Score | Result | Competition |
|---|---|---|---|---|---|---|
| 1 | 28 March 2017 | Stade de France, Saint-Denis, France | France | 2–0 | 2–0 | Friendly |

== Honours ==
Sevilla

- UEFA Europa League: 2014–15

Barcelona

- La Liga: 2012–13, 2017–18

Watford

- FA Cup runner-up: 2018–19

Spain U17

- UEFA European Under-17 Championship runner-up: 2010

Spain U19

- UEFA European Under-19 Championship: 2011, 2012

Spain U21

- UEFA European Under-21 Championship runner-up: 2017

Individual

- UEFA European Under-19 Championship Golden Player: 2012
- UEFA European Under-19 Championship Team of the Tournament: 2012
- Lo Stadio Player of the Month: September 2022
