= Stadionul Mogoșoaia =

Football stadium in Romania

Coordinates: 44°32′13″N 25°58′59″E

- Interactive map of Stadionul Mogoșoaia
- Location: Mogoșoaia, Romania
- Capacity: 2,000

Construction
- Opened: 2002

Stadionul Mogoșoaia is a football stadium in Romania which is part of the National Football Centre. Located in Mogoșoaia, it holds 2,000 people.

The training ground of the Romania national football team, it held four games at the 2011 UEFA European Under-19 Football Championship, three group matches and a semifinal.
