= Jeff Hendrick =

Irish footballer (born 1992)

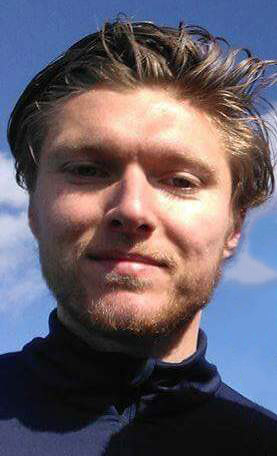
- Hendrick in 2017

Personal information
- Full name: Jeffrey Patrick Hendrick
- Date of birth: 31 January 1992 (age 34)
- Place of birth: Dublin, Ireland
- Height: 1.85 m (6 ft 1 in)
- Position: Midfielder

Youth career
- 1998–2008: St. Kevin's Boys
- 2008–2010: Derby County

Senior career*
Years	Team	Apps	(Gls)
2010–2016	Derby County	196	(22)
2016–2020	Burnley	122	(9)
2020–2024	Newcastle United	25	(3)
2022	→ Queens Park Rangers (loan)	10	(0)
2022–2023	→ Reading (loan)	45	(4)
2023–2024	→ Sheffield Wednesday (loan)	11	(1)
2025	Derby County	0	(0)
Total		409	(39)

International career
2006–2007	Republic of Ireland U15	4	(0)
2007–2008	Republic of Ireland U16	4	(0)
2008–2009	Republic of Ireland U17	6	(4)
2009–2010	Republic of Ireland U18	4	(1)
2010–2011	Republic of Ireland U19	13	(1)
2011–2014	Republic of Ireland U21	7	(0)
2013–2023	Republic of Ireland	79	(2)
- * Club domestic league appearances and goals

Jeffrey Patrick Hendrick (born 31 January 1992) is an Irish former professional footballer who played as a midfielder.

Hendrick spent his childhood years with boyhood club St. Kevin's Boys in his native Dublin. He had a number of unsuccessful trials in England before joining Derby County's youth academy in 2008. He made his professional debut in April 2011 after impressive performances with the reserve team led manager Nigel Clough to include him in the senior setup. He quickly became a regular starter and appeared in the 2014 Championship play-off final where Derby missed out on promotion with a 1–0 loss to Queens Park Rangers. In his first stint at Derby, Hendrick amassed a total of 214 appearances and 26 goals over six years.

Hendrick joined newly promoted Premier League side, Burnley, in August 2016, signing a three-year deal. He was part of the team that finished in seventh place in the 2017–18 season which saw them qualify for the second qualifying round of the following season's Europa League. This was Burnley's first taste of European football in 51 years. Hendrick left Burnley in June 2020, having racked up 139 appearances and 10 goals across four seasons. He joined fellow Premier League club Newcastle United in a free transfer on a four-year deal in August 2020. Hendrick left Newcastle in July 2024 following the expiration of his contract after only featuring 27 times. His time at Newcastle was interspersed by loan spells at Championship clubs Queens Park Rangers, Reading and Sheffield Wednesday respectively. Hendrick would remain a free agent until March 2025, when he rejoined Derby County on a short-term deal. Having not featured for Derby in his second spell with the club, he was released following the conclusion of the 2024–25 season. In October 2025, Hendrick announced his retirement from football at 33 years of age.

Hendrick represented Ireland at all youth levels. He made his senior international debut in February 2013 and appeared 79 times for Ireland, scoring twice across ten years as an international. He featured for the Boys in Green at Euro 2016, starting all four of Ireland's matches at the tournament.

== Club career ==
=== Derby County ===
==== Early years ====
Hendrick joined Derby County as a youth player in 2008 from St Kevin's Boys in Dublin, having overcome Osgood-Schlatter disease, and played regularly for the club's academy side before breaking into the reserve team during the 2009–10 campaign. He made one start and seven substitute appearances as the club's reserve side successfully captured the 2009–10 Central League Central Section title. At the end of the season his first involvement with the Derby County first team came on 2 May 2010 as he was an unused substitute in a 2–0 victory over Cardiff City in the final match of the 2009–10 season. A few weeks later, on 8 July 2010, he signed his first professional contract, alongside four other Derby County academy graduates, including fellow Republic of Ireland Youth international Ryan Connolly and future League of Ireland player Graham Kelly.

Hendrick played a more significant role in Derby's reserve side during the 2010–11 season, making 17 starts in all competitions and scoring 9 goals, including a hat-trick in a 14–1 victory over Shirebrook Town in the Derbyshire Senior Cup and a brace in a 5–0 win over Buxton in the final of the same competition. Throughout the campaign, Hendrick impressed enough to earn a contract extension at Derby, which he signed in January 2011 to take him through until summer 2012.

==== 2011 to 2013 ====
Approaching the end of the 2010–11 campaign, Derby manager Nigel Clough stated his desire to give Hendrick a run in the first team: "(He's) progressed and done well this season...we would love to see him in the team for three or four games."

Hendrick was happy with his progression and knew he would have to sustain his form to nail down a spot in the first team: "It's why we all play football – to get in the first team, so I'm just hoping that I can keep pushing on and doing well."

He made his debut in the following match on 23 April 2011, as an 80th-minute replacement for Robbie Savage in a 4–2 home defeat to Burnley.

Ahead of the 2011–12 season, Clough stated that Hendrick would feature in the Derby County first team squad more often. He was allocated the squad number of 23. Despite missing the majority of Derby's pre-season due to his call-up to the European under-19 tournament, Hendrick was involved in first-team duty from the start of the campaign, making substitute appearances in the season's opening two matches, against Birmingham City and Watford. He then claimed a place in the starting line-up from the third match (a 1–0 win at Blackpool) onward.

He scored his first professional goal in his fifth start of the season, claiming the winner in a 2–1 victory at local rivals Nottingham Forest. His performance earned him a place in the Championship Team of the Week and his rich vein of form followed into the next match, a 3–0 thumping of Millwall, in which Hendrick grabbed his first goal at Pride Park and secured a second consecutive Team of the Week place.

Hendrick's form saw him linked with switches to Premier League duo Aston Villa and West Bromwich Albion. The speculation saw Derby enter into contract talks with the midfielder over a new four-year deal. However, both his and Derby's form tailed off badly over the subsequent six weeks with the team winning just once in nine matches although Nigel Clough told BBC Radio Derby he was not concerned by his side's slump. The following month, Hendrick signed a new three-and-a-half-year contract, extending his stay at the Pride Park club until the summer of 2015.

Hendrick missed Derby's Christmas and New Year programme of fixtures with an ankle ligament injury in a 1–0 defeat against Ipswich Town. He returned to the first team squad as an unused substitute in a 1–0 win against Coventry City on 14 January 2012, returning to playing action a week later in the 0–0 draw at Burnley as a 47th-minute substitute. Hendrick became a mainstay of the Derby team for the remainder of the season after this fixture, displacing James Bailey in central midfield. He scored his third goal of the season in a 3–2 home win against Crystal Palace on 24 March. Hendrick's form throughout the season was rewarded when he won the club's Sammy Crooks Young Player of the Year award.

"It has been hard when things weren't going my way and I was not performing as well as I've wanted. I've been beating myself up over it. I've played a few games here and there where I've played well, but I want to get more consistency into my game. I'm hoping to get better and better and string a good run of games together now."

— Hendrick on his struggles for form with Derby County during the 2012–13 season.

Hendrick began the 2012–13 season in the starting eleven but after poor performances and scoring only once in his first 16 matches, he was dropped for Michael Jacobs in the 3–2 victory over Birmingham City on 24 November 2012. He regained his starting place shortly afterwards, and admitted he was struggling to replicate his previous season's performances. Hendrick's form soon improved and he scored his second goal of the season in a 2–0 win at Bristol City on 15 December.

==== 2013 to 2015 ====
Hendrick started 2013 in good form, scoring three goals in the opening three matches, including a goal against Middlesbrough in a 3–1 home win which was later named Derby's Goal of the Season. Former Derby teammate Kevin Kilbane stated that Hendrick had the ability to play in the Premier League. He scored again on 9 February 2013, in a 2–2 draw against Sheffield Wednesday. He earned further praise for his performance in Derby's 3–0 win at home to Bristol City on 29 March, where he scored the opening goal.

Hendrick finished the season as runner-up for the Derby County Player of the Season Award and was named the 58th-best player in the 2012–13 Championship by the Actim Index.

Ahead of the 2013–14 season, Hendrick was set to compete with Craig Bryson, Paul Coutts and Will Hughes for a starting berth, with Clough stating that rotation could be utilised. He started in Derby's first five matches, before succumbing to a chipped ankle bone injury in the 3–0 win at Yeovil Town in late August, with a scan revealing damage worse than expected and was later ruled out for 12 weeks.

Hendrick scored four league goals during the 2013–14 season, helping Derby reach the play-offs. In the play-off semi-final, Derby came up against Brighton & Hove Albion. On 11 May 2014, Hendrick scored in the 4–1 home victory in the second leg as Brighton were defeated 6–2 on aggregate. On 24 May, he played in the play-off final as Derby lost 1–0 to Queens Park Rangers thereby missing out on promotion to the Premier League.

On 26 June 2014, Hendrick agreed a new four-year contract with Derby, which would keep him at the club until the end of the 2017–18 season.

Hendrick scored his first goal of the 2014–15 season in the league opener against Rotherham United on 9 August 2014 which ended in a 1–0 win for Derby. He scored his fourth and fifth goals of the season on 8 November in a 5–0 thrashing of Wolverhampton Wanderers as Derby moved to the top of the Championship. Hendrick's 85th-minute equaliser in the 3–3 draw at Millwall on 25 April 2015 helped keep alive the team's play-off hopes. Derby needed a victory in their final match against Reading to secure a play-off place but lost 3–0 and finished the 2014–15 season in eighth position as ultimately they had earned just 12 points out of a possible 39 since beating Charlton Athletic in February. This season was Hendrick's most fruitful to date in terms of goalscoring as he netted a total of nine goals in 47 matches in all competitions.

==== 2015 to 2016 ====
Hendrick scored his first goal of the 2015–16 season in a 2–2 draw away at Leeds United on 29 December 2015. He scored his second of the season in the 3–1 away win against Brentford on 20 February 2016. After being out of first-team action since March, Hendrick returned for the final league match against Ipswich Town on 7 May but was an unused substitute. Derby finished in fifth place in the Championship and qualified for the play-offs where they would meet Hull City in the semi-final. Hendrick was again an unused substitute in the semi-final first leg but returned to the starting line-up for the second leg and played the full 90 minutes as Derby lost 3–2 on aggregate to the Tigers.

Hendrick's 2016–17 season started off poorly as he picked up a hamstring injury in a 2–0 loss to Barnsley on 13 August 2016.

=== Burnley ===
==== 2016 to 2018 ====
On 31 August 2016, Hendrick joined Premier League side Burnley for a club record £10.5 million fee on a three-year deal. He made his debut on 10 September, coming on as a 75th-minute substitute in a 1–1 draw at home to Hull City. He made his first start for Burnley on 17 September, playing the full 90 minutes in a 3–0 away defeat against reigning Premier League champions Leicester City. Nine days later, Hendrick netted his first goal for Burnley in a 2–0 home win over Watford with a header from a Steven Defour cross.

He scored his second goal for his new club on 10 December 2016 with a 25-yard volley in a 3–2 home victory over Bournemouth. Hendrick's strike was nominated for Goal of the Month; it came third in the public vote, behind strikes by Alexis Sánchez in second and Henrikh Mkhitaryan in first and would later earn him the Burnley Goal of the Season award. On 4 February 2017, he was sent off against Watford in the sixth minute for a two-footed challenge on José Holebas as Burnley were defeated 2–1 at Vicarage Road.

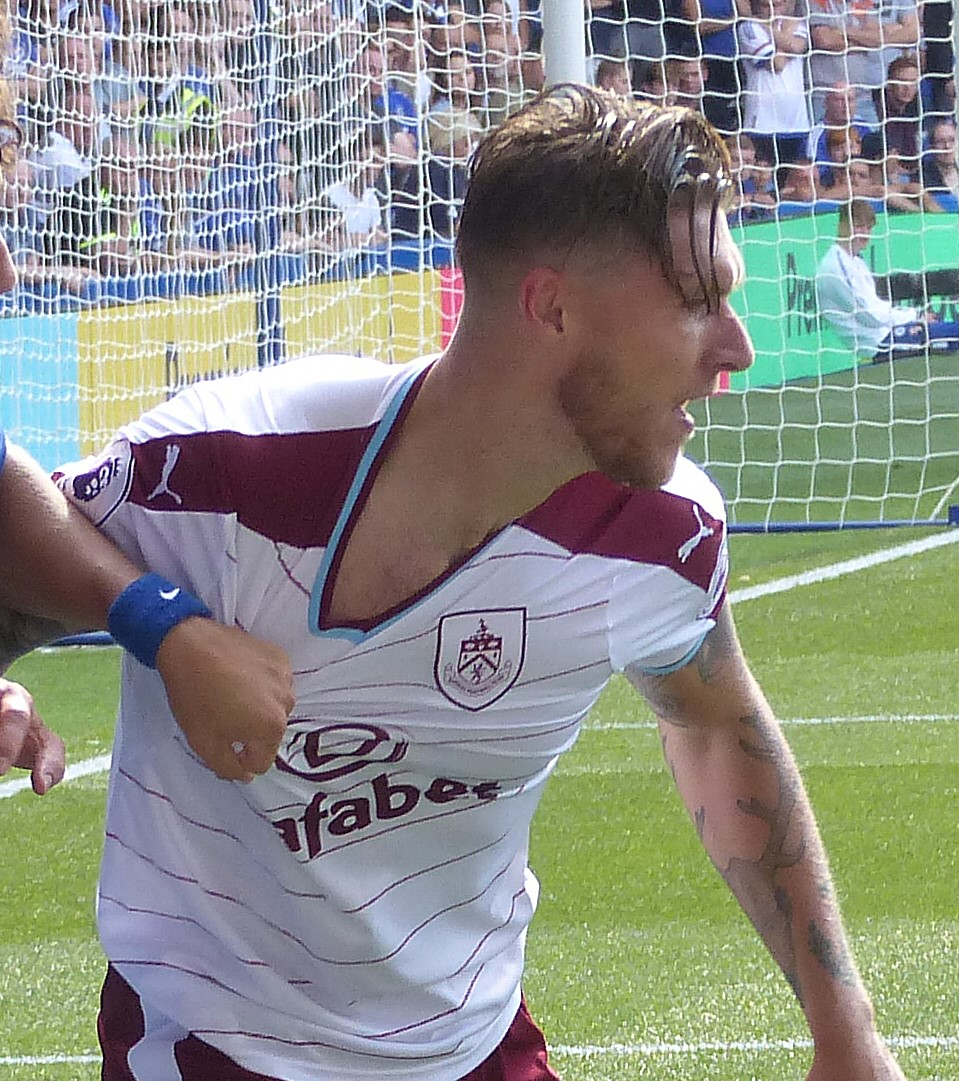
Hendrick playing for Burnley against Chelsea in August 2017

Hendrick opened his 2017–18 goalscoring account on 1 October away at Everton, finishing off a move that consisted of 24 passes. Burnley would go on to win 1–0. He netted his second goal of the season in a 1–0 home victory over Newcastle United on 30 October in what was Sean Dyche's fifth anniversary as Burnley manager.

Hendrick had a goal ruled out for offside and was denied a clear penalty in the 0–0 draw at Huddersfield Town on 30 December. Huddersfield goalkeeper Jonas Lössl later admitted he had made contact with the midfielder:

"I touched him. I spoke to the referee and I said there was contact. I didn't do it on purpose, but there was contact. I told the referee after but it was his decision."

Burnley finished seventh in the 2017–18 Premier League and qualified for the second qualifying round of the 2018–19 Europa League.

On 20 June 2018, it was announced that Burnley would face Scottish Premiership club Aberdeen in the second qualifying round of the Europa League. Hendrick made his Europa League debut when he started on 26 July 2018 at Pittodrie Stadium. He was replaced by Sam Vokes in the 67th minute with Vokes eventually going on to score the equaliser to make it 1–1 in the 80th minute. The match ended 1–1, meaning Burnley had the advantage of an away goal. Burnley were eventually eliminated in the play-off round with a 4–2 aggregate defeat to Olympiacos. Hendrick played in all six matches of The Clarets' Europa League campaign.

==== 2018 to 2020 ====
His first goal of the 2018–19 season came on 26 August 2018 in a 4–2 away defeat against newly promoted Fulham. With 91 Burnley appearances already made, Hendrick signed a one-year contract extension on 20 December 2018 which would take his stay at the club until the summer of 2020. His manager Sean Dyche stated his praise for the midfielder:

"He's done well for us. We have asked a lot of him. We have used him in a number of different positions that sometimes aren't natural to him and over time he has delivered good performances for us."

On 22 April 2019, Hendrick opened the scoring in a 2–2 draw against Chelsea at Stamford Bridge with a fine volley for his third goal of the season. This draw saw Burnley reach 40 points, virtually guaranteeing their safety in the Premier League. Hendrick's goal was the 1,000th goal Chelsea had conceded in the Premier League. This strike earned him his second Goal of the Season award for the club.

On 14 September 2019, Hendrick scored in his 100th Premier League appearance for Burnley with a stoppage-time equaliser in a 1–1 draw at Brighton & Hove Albion. It had appeared that Hendrick was in Sean Dyche's future plans as he had started 22 of Burnley's 29 matches before the 2019–20 season was brought to a sudden halt because of the COVID-19 pandemic. However, on 23 June 2020, it was revealed that Hendrick had turned down an offer to stay at Burnley and would end his four-year stint at the club on the expiration of his contract on 30 June.

=== Newcastle United ===
After leaving Burnley and having been linked to Italian clubs Milan and Roma, Hendrick decided to join fellow Premier League club Newcastle United on 24 August 2020 in a free transfer on a four-year deal. He described Newcastle as 'a massive club' and manager Steve Bruce hailed his new signing by saying: "He's an experienced international footballer who can play all across the midfield so we welcome him aboard. He'll be a big asset to us, on and off the pitch."

He made his Newcastle debut in a 2–1 win over Barnsley in a pre-season friendly on 29 August 2020. Two weeks later, Hendrick scored and also set up a goal for Callum Wilson on his competitive debut for Newcastle in a 2–0 away win over West Ham United. His second goal of the season came on 16 December as he opened the scoring in a 5–2 away defeat to Leeds United. On 6 February 2021, Hendrick was sent off early in the second half of a 3–2 home win over Southampton for a second bookable offence after pulling back Takumi Minamino. He received criticism from pundit Alex Scott after the red card: "It's stupid. He doesn't even need to pull Takumi Minamino back there. He's not through on goal, there's no reason for him to do what he just did."

Hendrick fell out of favour after the sending off and was limited to substitute appearances from March onwards as Newcastle finished in 12th place. He ended the season with 23 appearances in all competitions, scoring twice.

He scored his first goal of the 2021–22 season on 2 October 2021 in a 2–1 away defeat to Wolverhampton Wanderers as Newcastle remained winless in the league after seven matches.

On 26 May 2023, having been on loan for the majority of his spell, Newcastle manager Eddie Howe said the player had no future at the club and would be moved on.

On 29 May 2024, Newcastle announced that Hendrick would leave the club in the summer when his contract expired in June.

==== 2021–22 season: Loan to Queens Park Rangers ====
After finding his game time severely limited at Newcastle, on 31 January 2022 — his 30th birthday — Hendrick joined Championship side Queens Park Rangers on loan until the end of the season. Five days later, he made his QPR debut in a 2–0 FA Cup defeat away at Peterborough United, coming on as a substitute at the start of the second half. He made his league debut for the club on 9 February as a 60th-minute substitute in a 2–2 home draw against Middlesbrough.

Ultimately, Hendrick's loan spell at QPR did not go well. He had many poor outings for The Rs, ranking 19th among 26 players to have featured for the team during the season according to WhoScored.com. On 11 May, Queens Park Rangers confirmed in a club statement that they would not be following up on the loan with a permanent offer. He made 11 appearances in all competitions without scoring a goal.

==== 2022–23 season: Loan to Reading ====
On 12 July 2022, Reading announced the season-long loan signing of Hendrick where he would link up with compatriot and fellow newcomer Shane Long. He scored on his Reading debut in a pre-season friendly against Maidenhead United less than two hours after the loan deal was finalised. He made his competitive debut for the club on 30 July 2022, playing the full match in a 1–0 away loss to Blackpool.

Hendrick made his 400th career club appearance in the 3–0 home defeat to Sunderland on 14 September 2022. He then scored his first competitive goal for Reading on 4 October in a 1–1 draw against Norwich City which kept The Royals in third position in the table. On 14 January 2023, Hendrick netted two first-half goals in a 2–2 draw at home to former club Queens Park Rangers — his first brace since February 2015.

The season ended in big disappointment for Hendrick as Reading were relegated to League One after going on an abject run of just two wins from their final 22 league matches. This was coupled with the club being handed a six-point deduction towards the end of the season over a historical breach of the EFL's profitability and sustainability limits.

==== 2023–24 season: Loan to Sheffield Wednesday ====
After being sent to train with Newcastle's under-21s, Hendrick signed for Championship club Sheffield Wednesday on 1 September 2023 on a season-long loan deal. He made his debut just over two weeks later on 16 September, starting the game against Ipswich Town in an eventual 1–0 home defeat. His first goal came on 29 November, scoring a stoppage time equaliser in the 93rd minute against top of the league Leicester City in a match that ended 1–1.

Shortly after this goal, it became noticeable that Hendrick was missing from subsequent matchday squads without an explanation issued. However, on 31 December it was finally made clear that Hendrick had suffered a knee injury earlier that month and was in the midst of his recovery. Hendrick would only go on to feature just twice more for Sheffield Wednesday and returned to his parent club Newcastle at the end of the season.

=== Return to Derby County and retirement ===
On 7 March 2025, Hendrick returned to newly promoted Championship side Derby County on a short-term contract until the end of the season. Hendrick featured as an unused substitute on six occasions, however he failed to make an appearance for the first team and missed the last four matches with a calf injury as the club maintained their Championship status. On 16 May 2025, Derby announced that Hendrick would leave the club upon the expiry of his contract at the end of June.

On 1 October 2025, after having been without a club since July, Hendrick announced his retirement from professional football. He had attempted to find other clubs but could not find a suitable match for his family circumstances and his location.

== International career ==
=== Youth ===
Born in Dublin, Hendrick was capped by Ireland at under-15, under-16, under-17, under-18, under-19 and under-21 levels. He was shortlisted for the Republic of Ireland under-17 level International Player of the Year award in July 2010. He played a key role in the U19s successful 2011 European Under-19 Championship qualifying campaign putting in a "string of impressive displays" as he featured in all three group matches and notched the only goal of the match in a 1–0 win over Poland U19s. In July 2011, Hendrick was named in the squad for the European Under-19 Championships. He started in all four of Ireland's matches at the tournament as they were knocked out in the semi-final stage to Spain.

Upon his return from the tournament, Hendrick was called up to the Irish U21 squad for the first time. He made his debut in a 2–1 victory against Austria U21s on 9 August 2011.

=== Senior ===
In January 2013, it was reported that Ireland head coach Giovanni Trapattoni was watching Hendrick with the view to giving the player his first call-up to the senior side and later in the month Hendrick was called up to the senior squad to play in a friendly against Poland on 6 February 2013. Hendrick came on as a 71st-minute substitute for James McCarthy in the 2–0 win and provided an assist for Wes Hoolahan for Ireland's second goal in this match, showing great composure in doing so with a well-executed pass. Hendrick received his first Ireland start in his fourth cap, in a match against World and European Champions Spain on 12 June 2013 at the Yankee Stadium in New York City. He played a starring role in the Euro 2016 qualifier against Georgia in the Aviva Stadium on 7 September 2015. His run and nutmeg set up an easy finish for Jonathan Walters which proved to be the only goal of the match.

Hendrick started in all four of Ireland's matches at Euro 2016. He hit the crossbar against Sweden and was unlucky not to score against Italy. He earned much praise for his performances as he played a vital role in securing qualification to the knockout stages of the championship. Ireland eventually lost 2–1 to hosts France in the Round of 16.

Hendrick scored his first goal for Ireland on 5 September 2016. He opened the scoring in the third minute in the 2–2 away draw against Serbia in a 2018 World Cup qualifying match with a low shot just outside the penalty area which was deflected in off Branislav Ivanović.

His second goal for Ireland came on 23 March 2019 with a 12-yard strike in the 49th minute of a 1–0 away triumph against Gibraltar in a Euro 2020 qualifying match. This goal ended Ireland's drought of 446 minutes without finding the net in all competitions. Hendrick won his 50th cap for Ireland on 5 September 2019 in a 1–1 draw at home to Switzerland.

On 15 November 2020, in what was his 60th appearance for Ireland, Hendrick was sent off in the 94th minute of a 1–0 away defeat to Wales in a Nations League match.

== Style of play ==
Jeff can play anywhere across the midfield, I think he can play behind the strikers. Can he sit in and do a holding job? That's not outside his capability.

— Republic of Ireland manager Martin O'Neill on Hendrick's adaptability.

Hendrick was known for being very hard-working, tactically aware and for his ability to pass the ball successfully. He was capable of playing as a central midfielder, out wide on the right of midfield or as an attacking midfielder behind the striker. His big strength was in winning second balls from aerial duels and keeping the attack going in advanced positions. Owing to his lack of proficiency in scoring goals, Hendrick's most frequent task was recycling possession high up the pitch to create chances for his teammates.

== Personal life ==
Growing up, Hendrick played Gaelic football for Parnells and has a close friendship with former Dublin county team goalkeeper Stephen Cluxton. He has twin brothers named Ross and Alan.

In 2020, Hendrick started dating Scottish model Amanda Hendrick. The couple have one son together, Sonny, and he has a close relationship with Amanda's daughter Misha from a prior relationship with Australian metal band singer JJ Peters.

== Career statistics ==
=== Club ===
Appearances and goals by club, season and competition
Club	Season	League			FA Cup		League Cup		Other		Total	
Club	Season	Division	Apps	Goals	Apps	Goals	Apps	Goals	Apps	Goals	Apps	Goals
Derby County	2009–10 (Note: He was an unused substitute in the final match of the 2009–10 season.)	Championship	0	0	—		—		—		0	0
Derby County	2010–11	Championship	4	0	0	0	0	0	—		4	0
Derby County	2011–12	Championship	42	3	1	0	0	0	—		43	3
Derby County	2012–13	Championship	45	6	2	1	0	0	—		47	7
Derby County	2013–14	Championship	30	4	1	0	1	0	3 (Note: Appearances in Championship play-offs)	1	35	5
Derby County	2014–15	Championship	41	7	2	0	4	2	—		47	9
Derby County	2015–16	Championship	32	2	1	0	1	0	1	0	35	2
Derby County	2016–17	Championship	2	0	—		1	0	—		3	0
Derby County	Total		196	22	7	1	7	2	4	1	214	26
Burnley	2016–17	Premier League	32	2	3	0	—		—		35	2
Burnley	2017–18	Premier League	34	2	1	0	1	0	—		36	2
Burnley	2018–19	Premier League	32	3	2	0	1	0	6 (Note: Appearances in UEFA Europa League)	0	41	3
Burnley	2019–20	Premier League	24	2	2	1	1	0	—		27	3
Burnley	Total		122	9	8	1	3	0	6	0	139	10
Newcastle United	2020–21	Premier League	22	2	1	0	0	0	—		23	2
Newcastle United	2021–22	Premier League	3	1	0	0	1	0	—		4	1
Newcastle United	2023–24	Premier League	0	0	—		—		—		0	0
Newcastle United	Total		25	3	1	0	1	0	0	0	27	3
Queens Park Rangers (loan)	2021–22	Championship	10	0	1	0	—		—		11	0
Reading (loan)	2022–23	Championship	45	4	1	0	0	0	—		46	4
Sheffield Wednesday (loan)	2023–24	Championship	11	1	1	0	—		—		12	1
Derby County	2024–25	Championship	0	0	—		—		—		0	0
Career total			409	39	19	2	11	2	10	1	449	44

=== International ===
Appearances and goals by national team and year
National team	Year	Apps	Goals
Republic of Ireland	2013	4	0
Republic of Ireland	2014	7	0
Republic of Ireland	2015	8	0
Republic of Ireland	2016	10	1
Republic of Ireland	2017	8	0
Republic of Ireland	2018	8	0
Republic of Ireland	2019	9	1
Republic of Ireland	2020	6	0
Republic of Ireland	2021	8	0
Republic of Ireland	2022	9	0
Republic of Ireland	2023	2	0
Total		79	2

Ireland score listed first, score column indicates score after each Hendrick goal.

International goals by date, venue, cap, opponent, score, result and competition
No.	Date	Venue	Cap	Opponent	Score	Result	Competition	Ref.
1	5 September 2016	Red Star Stadium, Belgrade, Serbia	27	Serbia	1–0	2–2	2018 FIFA World Cup qualification	
2	23 March 2019	Victoria Stadium, Gibraltar	46	Gibraltar	1–0	1–0	UEFA Euro 2020 qualification	

== Honours ==
Derby County

- Derbyshire Senior Cup: 2010–11

Individual

- Sammy Crooks Young Player of the Year: 2011–12
- Derby County Goal of the Season: 2012–13
- Burnley Goal of the Season: 2016–17, 2018–19
