= Jaroslav Hřebík =

Czech footballer and coach

Personal information
- Date of birth: 16 December 1948 (age 77)
- Place of birth: Benešov, Czechoslovakia
- Position: Striker

Youth career
- 1958–1968: Jawa Týnec

Senior career*
Years	Team	Apps	(Gls)
1968–1973	FK Viktoria Žižkov		
1974	Dukla Prague		
1975–1976	Škoda Plzeň		
1977–1982	Spartak BS Vlašim		
1982–1985	ČSAD Benešov		
1985–1988	TJ Jílové		

Managerial career
- 1983–1984: ČSAD Benešov (player/coach)
- 1992–1994: FK Švarc Benešov
- 1995–1996: Viktoria Plzeň
- 1996: Viktoria Žižkov
- 1997–1998: Hradec Králové
- 1998–1999: Slavia Prague
- 2000–2001: Jablonec
- 2001–2002: Sparta Prague
- 2004: FC Dynamo Moscow
- 2004–2005: Sparta Prague
- 2008–2011: Czech Republic U-19
- 2011–2012: AC Sparta Prague (sporting director)
- 2012–2023: AC Sparta Prague (youth academy dir.)
- * Club domestic league appearances and goals

Jaroslav Hřebík (born 16 December 1948 in Benešov, Czechoslovakia) is a Czech professional football coach and a former player. Hřebík played a total of 22 matches, scoring 4 times, in the Czechoslovak First League. Between 1973 and 1977 he played in the competition for Dukla Prague and Škoda Plzeň.

As a manager, Hřebík led seven teams in the Czech First League: FK Švarc Benešov, Viktoria Plzeň, Viktoria Žižkov, Hradec Králové, Slavia Prague, Jablonec and Sparta Prague. During his management career he won the 1998–99 Czech Cup with Slavia, and the 2004–05 Czech First League with Sparta, as well as leading Czech Republic U-19 to the final of the 2011 UEFA European Under-19 Championship.
