= Ion Prodan (footballer) =

Moldovan footballer (born 1992)

Personal information
- Date of birth: 21 March 1992 (age 34)
- Place of birth: Anenii Noi, Moldova
- Height: 1.84 m (6 ft 0 in)
- Position: Centre-back

Senior career*
Years	Team	Apps	(Gls)
2011–2012	Milsami Orhei	1	(0)
2011	→ Zimbru-2 Chișinău (loan)	3	(1)
2012–2013	Speranța Crihana Veche	24	(0)
2013	Academia Chișinău	13	(0)
2014	FC Clinceni	7	(0)
2014–2015	Saxan Gagauz Yeri	13	(0)
2015	Academia Chișinău	11	(1)
2016	Petrocub Hîncești	2	(0)
2017–2018	Turris Turnu Măgurele		
2018	CSMȘ Reșița		
2019	Daco-Getica București	14	(1)

International career
2011–2013	Moldova U21	21	(1)
- * Club domestic league appearances and goals as of 23:20, 19 February 2024 (UTC)

Ion Prodan (born 21 March 1992), also known as Ivan Prodan, is a Moldovan footballer who most recently played as a centre-back for Liga II club Daco-Getica București. He was also a member of Moldova U21 until 2013.
