= Syarhey Hlyabko =

Belarusian footballer

Personal information
- Date of birth: 23 August 1992 (age 34)
- Place of birth: Minsk, Belarus
- Height: 1.79 m (5 ft 10 1/2 in)
- Position: Midfielder

Youth career
- 2009–2012: BATE Borisov

Senior career*
Years	Team	Apps	(Gls)
2010–2014	BATE Borisov	1	(0)
2013–2014	→ Slutsk (loan)	56	(7)
2015–2016	Slutsk	46	(4)
2017	Gorodeya	13	(0)
2017	Torpedo Minsk	14	(2)
2018	Partizán Bardejov	13	(1)
2018–2019	Torpedo Minsk	25	(1)
2019	Gomel	13	(1)
2020	Belshina Bobruisk	25	(4)
2021–2023	Slutsk	67	(7)
2024	Dnepr Mogilev	16	(0)
2025	Uzda		
2025	Gorodeya	1	(0)

International career
2010–2011	Belarus U19	3	(2)
2013	Belarus U21	5	(1)
- * Club domestic league appearances and goals as of 4 December 2025

Syarhey Hlyabko (Belarusian: Сяргей Глябко; Russian: Серге́й Глебко (Sergey Glebko); born 23 August 1992) is a Belarusian professional football player.

== Honours ==
BATE Borisov

- Belarusian Premier League champion: 2010
