= Zidan Amar =

Israeli-Druze footballer

Zidan Amar زيدان عمار
Personal information
- Full name: Zidan Yusef Amar
- Date of birth: April 5, 1992 (age 34)
- Place of birth: Julis, Israel
- Position: Striker

Team information
- Current team: Maccabi Daliyat al-Karmel
- Number: 9

Youth career
- 2006–2008: Hapoel Nazareth Illit
- 2009–2011: Maccabi Haifa

Senior career*
Years	Team	Apps	(Gls)
2011–2012	Hapoel Nazareth Illit	21	(4)
2012–2013	Hapoel Acre	11	(1)
2013	Hakoah Amidar Ramat Gan	6	(0)
2013–2014	Maccabi Daliyat al-Karmel	20	(3)
2014–2015	Beitar Nahariya	21	(5)
2015–2017	Maccabi Ahi Nazareth	1	(0)
2015–2016	→ Hapoel Iksal	13	(2)
2017–2018	Maccabi Daliyat al-Karmel	17	(1)
2018–2019	Maccabi Bnei Reineh	22	(4)
2019–2020	Hapoel Tuba-Zangariyye	19	(6)
2020–2022	Hapoel Arraba	0	(0)
2020	→ Hapoel Bnei Bi'ina	3	(0)
2021–2022	→ Maccabi Ahva Sha'ab	35	(7)
2022	Hapoel Ironi Safed	8	(0)
2022–2023	Hapoel Ihud Bnei Sumei	5	(1)
2023–	Maccabi Ahva Sha'ab	13	(9)
- * Club domestic league appearances and goals as of 1 November 2024

Zidan Amar (Arabic: زيدان عمار, Hebrew: זידאן עמאר; born 5 April 1992) is an Israeli-Druze footballer who currently plays at Maccabi Ahva Sha'ab.

== Biography ==
As a child, he joined a local footballing school sponsored by Maccabi Tel Aviv in his home village, Julis, before moving to play for Hapoel Nazareth Illit's u-16 team. Two years later he transferred to Maccabi Haifa and played at the club's youth team, scoring 8 goals in his first season, helping the youth team winning the Israeli Noar Leumit League. Amar played a total of 23 matches in Israel's youth teams, scoring 5 goals

As a senior player, Amar had stints in Hapoel Acre, Hakoah Amidar Ramat Gan and Maccabi Daliyat al-Karmel before returning to Beitar Nahariya at the beginning of 2014–15 season.
