= Tomáš Jeleček =

Czech footballer (born 1992)

Personal information
- Date of birth: 25 February 1992 (age 34)
- Place of birth: Czechoslovakia
- Height: 1.53 m (5 ft 0 in)
- Position: Defender

Team information
- Current team: 1. FC Slovácko
- Number: 4

Senior career*
Years	Team	Apps	(Gls)
2011–	1. FC Slovácko	8	(0)

International career^{‡}
2007–2008	Czech Republic U16	11	(0)
2008	Czech Republic U17	5	(0)
2009–2010	Czech Republic U18	7	(0)
2010–2011	Czech Republic U19	14	(3)
2013	Czech Republic U21	1	(0)
- * Club domestic league appearances and goals as of 1 July 2012 ‡ National team caps and goals as of 22 December 2014

Tomáš Jeleček (born 25 February 1992) is a Czech football player who currently plays for Slovácko. He has represented the Czech Republic at under-21 level and was in the Czech squad for the 2011 UEFA European Under-19 Football Championship, where he played all five of his country's matches, scoring twice.
