= Artyom Kuchin =

Kazakhstani international referee (born 1977)

- Born: 15 December 1977 (age 48); Kazakhstan

Domestic
Years	League	Role

International
Years	League	Role
2009–	FIFA listed	Referee

Artyom Kuchin (Russian: Артём Кучин; born 12 December 1977) is a Kazakhstani international referee who refereed at 2014 FIFA World Cup qualifiers.
