= Martin Kraus (footballer, born 1992) =

Czech footballer

Personal information
- Date of birth: 30 May 1992 (age 34)
- Place of birth: Prague, Czechoslovakia
- Height: 1.77 m (5 ft 10 in)
- Position: Midfielder

Team information
- Current team: Králův Dvůr

Senior career*
Years	Team	Apps	(Gls)
2011–2012	Bohemians 1905	14	(0)
2012–2014	Příbram	9	(0)
2012–2013	→ Vlašim (loan)	9	(2)
2014–	Králův Dvůr	74	(32)

International career^{‡}
2011	Czech Republic U19	4	(0)
- * Club domestic league appearances and goals as of 29 June 2020 ‡ National team caps and goals as of 31 December 2011

Martin Kraus (born 30 May 1992) is a Czech footballer currently playing for FK Králův Dvůr. He has represented the Czech Republic at U-19 level, and plays as a midfielder.

== Playing career ==
=== Club career ===
Kraus arrived at Bohemians 1905 first team in 2010 and made his league debut against Jablonec on 4 March 2011.

=== International career ===
Kraus has represented his country at youth international level.
