= Patrik Lácha =

Czech footballer

Personal information
- Date of birth: 20 January 1992 (age 34)
- Place of birth: Czechoslovakia
- Height: 1.85 m (6 ft 1 in)
- Position: Midfielder

Team information
- Current team: FK Klášterec nad Ohří
- Number: 17

Senior career*
Years	Team	Apps	(Gls)
2010–	Teplice	13	(0)
2012	→ Ústí nad Labem (loan)	12	(1)
2012–	→ Baník Most (loan)	9	(1)

International career^{‡}
2007–2008	Czech Republic U-17	14	(0)
2008	Czech Republic U-16	4	(0)
2011	Czech Republic U-19	4	(2)
- * Club domestic league appearances and goals as of 1 February 2011 ‡ National team caps and goals as of 21 July 2011

Patrik Lácha (born 20 January 1992) is a Czech football player who currently plays for Fk Č.L. Neštěmice. He has represented his country at youth international level. He was named in his country's 18-man squad for the 2011 UEFA European Under-19 Football Championship.
