= Tomáš Přikryl =

Czech footballer

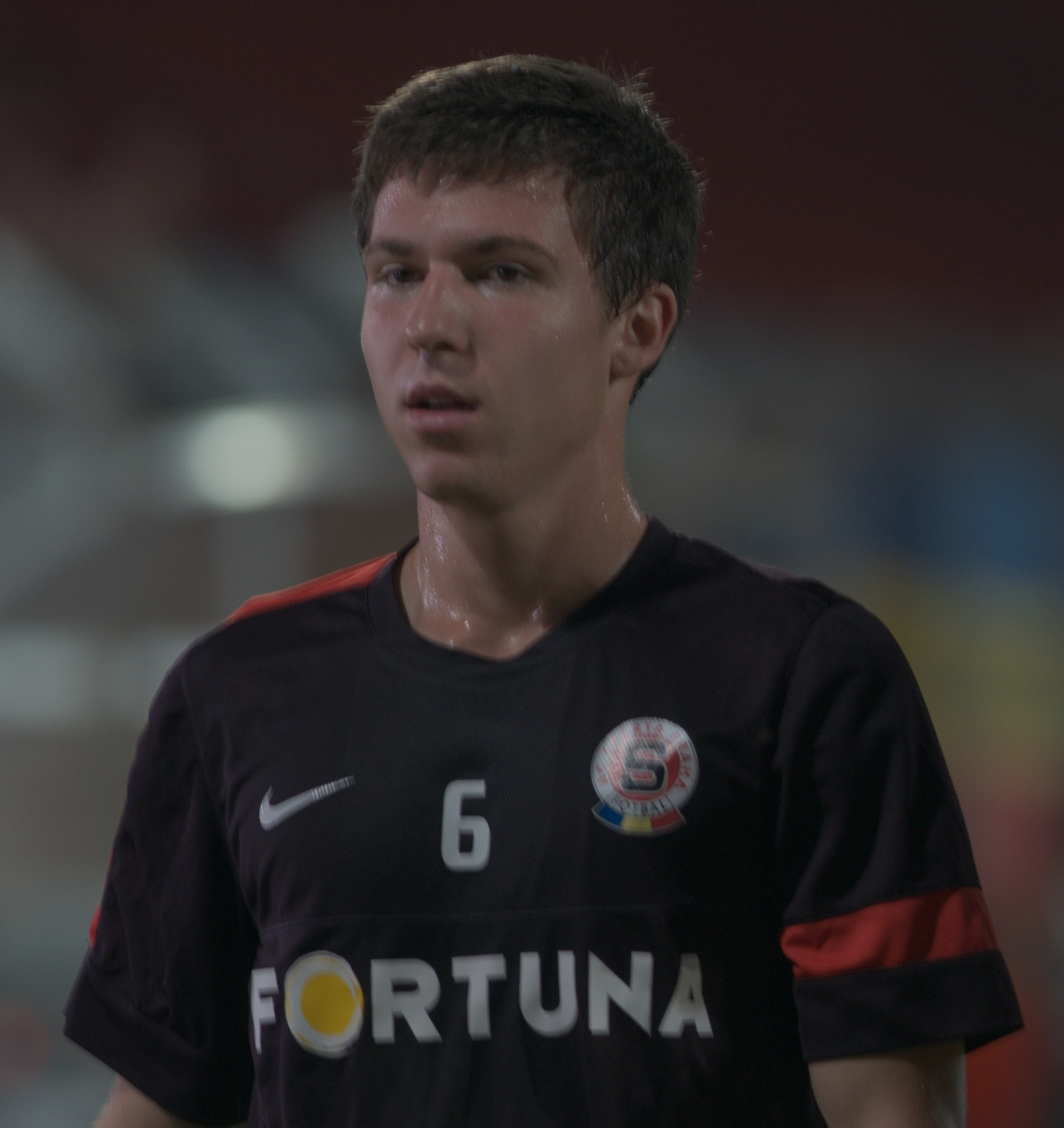
- Přikryl with Sparta Prague in 2012

Personal information
- Full name: Tomáš Přikryl
- Date of birth: 4 July 1992 (age 34)
- Place of birth: Olomouc, Czechoslovakia
- Height: 1.77 m (5 ft 9 1/2 in)
- Position: Winger

Youth career
- 1998–2002: Sokol Velký Týnec
- 2002–2010: Sigma Olomouc

Senior career*
Years	Team	Apps	(Gls)
2010–2012	Sigma Olomouc	27	(3)
2012–2016	Sparta Prague	65	(9)
2015	→ Dukla Prague (loan)	19	(5)
2016–2019	Mladá Boleslav	100	(18)
2019–2023	Jagiellonia Białystok	107	(11)
2023–2024	Warta Poznań	22	(2)
2024–2026	Odra Opole	53	(7)

International career
2007–2008	Czech Republic U16	9	(1)
2008–2009	Czech Republic U17	16	(1)
2009	Czech Republic U18	8	(0)
2009–2011	Czech Republic U19	23	(5)
2013–2015	Czech Republic U21	14	(3)
Medal record
Men's football
Representing Czech Republic
UEFA Euro U-19
Runner-up	2011 Romania
- * Club domestic league appearances and goals as of 08:29, 27 May 2026 (UTC)

Tomáš Přikryl (born 4 July 1992) is a Czech professional footballer who plays as a winger.

== Honours ==
Sparta Prague

- Czech First League: 2013–14
- Czech Cup: 2013–14
- Czech Supercup: 2014

Mladá Boleslav

- Czech Cup: 2015–16

Czech Republic U19

- UEFA European Under-19 Championship runner-up: 2011
