= Ali Dere =

Turkish professional footballer

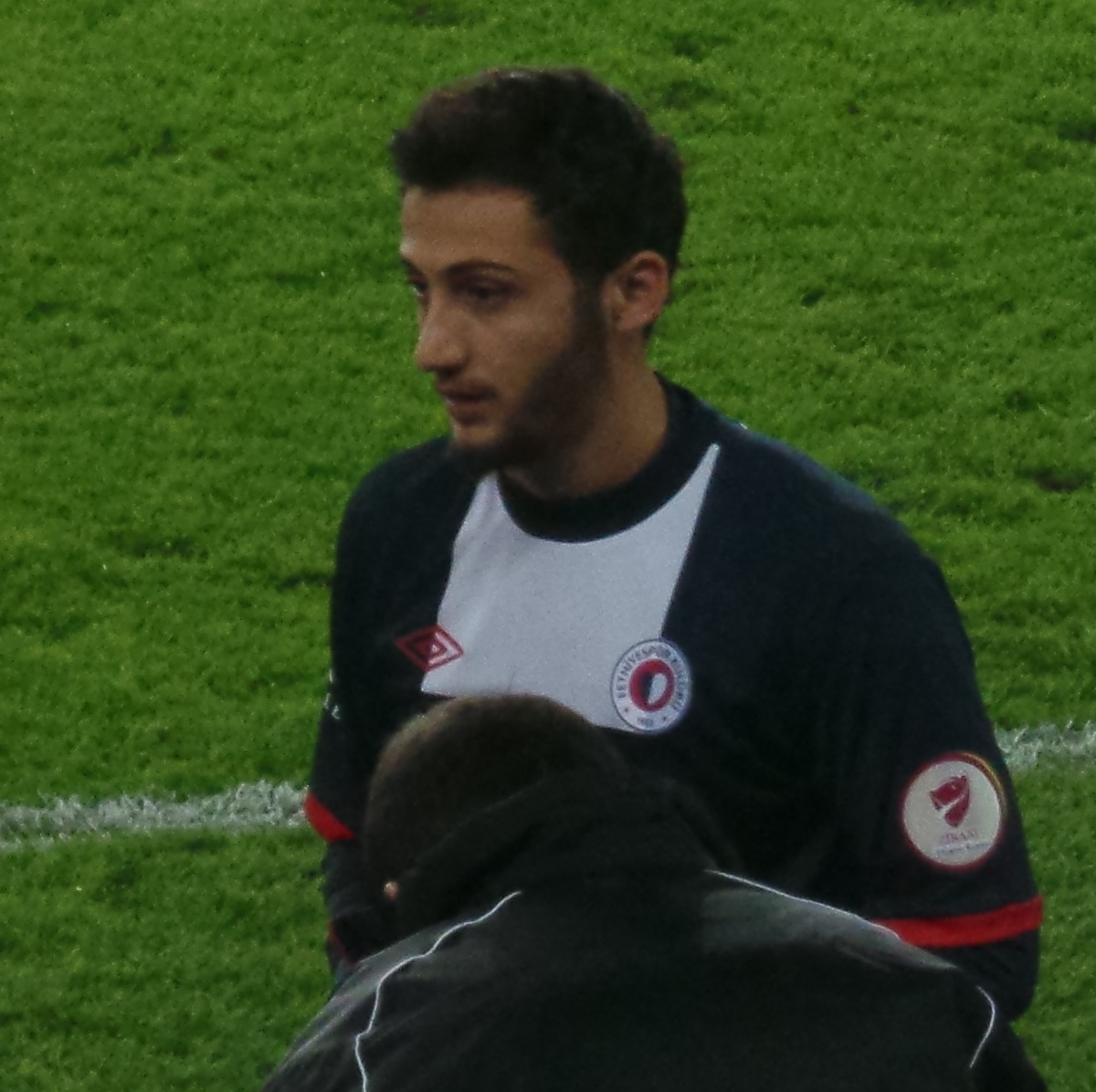

Personal information
- Date of birth: 29 September 1992 (age 34)
- Place of birth: Bolvadin, Afyon, Turkey
- Height: 1.76 m (5 ft 9 1/2 in)
- Position: Winger

Team information
- Current team: Muşspor
- Number: 11

Youth career
- 2005–2009: Konyaspor

Senior career*
Years	Team	Apps	(Gls)
2009–2017	Konyaspor	71	(4)
2013–2014	→ Fethiyespor (loan)	27	(0)
2014–2015	→ Boluspor (loan)	18	(1)
2015–2016	→ Konya Şeker (loan)	42	(8)
2017–2021	İstanbulspor	96	(10)
2021–2023	Altınordu	65	(2)
2023	Göztepe	5	(0)
2024	Sarıyer	11	(1)
2024–2026	Ankara Keçiörengücü	71	(1)
2026–	Muşspor	4	(1)

International career^{‡}
2010	Turkey U18	5	(1)
2011	Turkey U19	8	(3)
2012	Turkey U21	1	(0)
- * Club domestic league appearances and goals as of 1 October 2026 ‡ National team caps and goals as of 02:56, 28 April 2011 (UTC)

Ali Dere (born 29 September 1992) is a Turkish professional footballer who plays as a winger for Muşspor.

== International career ==
He is also a youth international, earning caps at U-18, U-19 and U-21 level for Turkey.

He was selected for the national team for the 2011 UEFA European Under-19 Championship in which he played three games and scored a goal.
