= 2031 and 2035 FIFA Women's World Cup bids =

Football World Cup host nation bids

The 2031 and 2035 FIFA Women's World Cup bidding process is the process used by FIFA to select the host for the 2031 FIFA Women's World Cup and 2035 FIFA Women's World Cup. This will be the first time that two Women's World Cups are awarded at the same time.

== Host selection ==
On 5 March 2025 the FIFA Council approved the bid regulations which restricted bids to CONCACAF and CAF members for 2031 and UEFA and CAF members for 2035. The key dates include:

- 31 March 2025: Member associations to submit their expressions of interest to host the 2031 and 2035 Women's World Cup
- 30 April 2025: Member associations to confirm their interest in bidding to host the Women's World Cup by submitting the bidding agreement
- Q2 2025: Bid workshop and observer programme to take place
- 28 November 2025: Member associations to submit their bids to FIFA
- February 2026: FIFA to organise on-site inspection visits to bidding countries
- 11 November 2026: Publication of FIFA's bid evaluation report
- 23 November 2026: Appointment of the 2031 and 2035 Women's World Cup host(s) by the FIFA Congress in Zurich.

== 2031 bids ==
There is currently one bid for 2031.

=== Costa Rica–Jamaica–Mexico–United States ===
On April 29, 2024, the United States Soccer Federation and Mexican Football Federation jointly announced that they would withdraw their bid for the 2027 FIFA Women's World Cup and instead bid for the 2031 edition. The United States previously hosted the 1999 edition and 2003 edition, while Mexico has never hosted a Women's World Cup. Both countries are co-hosts of the men's 2026 FIFA World Cup alongside Canada; media outlets speculated that the close proximity of the two events along with the 2028 Summer Olympics in Los Angeles may have been a factor in the changed bid plan. Other FIFA and confederation events the two countries have hosted are the 1970 World Cup, 1983 World Youth Championship, 1986 World Cup, 1999 Confederations Cup, and 2011 U-17 World Cup for Mexico and the 1994 World Cup, Copa América Centenario, 2024 Copa América, and 2025 FIFA Club World Cup for the United States. In addition, both countries have hosted the CONCACAF Gold Cup. On January 15, 2025, USSF president Cindy Parlow Cone confirmed the two nations would bid as soon as FIFA announces the bidding process. On March 5, 2025, the USSF announced that it had started the bidding process and later stated that month that they intended to expand the bid to other members in Central America and the Caribbean. On April 3, 2025, FIFA declared the United States bid the sole valid bid for 2031. Mexico later confirmed their involvement in the bid on May 27, 2025. Costa Rica and Jamaica later joined in October 20, 2025.

==== Evaluation report ====
On November 11, 2026, 12 days before the vote, the evaluation report was released. The joint bid from the United States, Mexico, Costa Rica and Jamaica was deemed to have a strong portfolio of existing stadiums, extensive infrastructure and strong commercial potential. Overall, the bid scored 4.4/5.

==== Evaluation score ====
2031 FIFA Women's World Cup evaluation report
Bidding nation(s)	Evaluation score
Costa Rica, Jamaica, Mexico, United States	4.4/5

=== Host selection ===
On November 23, 2026 in Zurich during the tenth extraordinary FIFA Congress, FIFA will announce the host for the 2031 FIFA Women's World Cup.

2026 Extraordinary FIFA Congress (Note: The FIFA extraordinary congress was held online.) 23 November 2026 – Zurich, Switzerland
Nation	Round 1
Costa Rica, Jamaica, Mexico, United States	Acclamation

== 2035 bids ==
There is currently one bid for 2035.

=== England, Northern Ireland, Scotland and Wales ===
In May 2023, The Football Association announced their intention to bid following the success of their women's team at the UEFA Women's Euro 2022 and the large attendance at Wembley Stadium for the 2022 Women's FA Cup final. This would be England's first time hosting the women's tournament, though they have significant hosting experience including the 1963 UEFA U-18, 1966 FIFA World Cup, 1983 UEFA U-18, 1993 UEFA U-18, UEFA Euro 1996, 2001 UEFA U-16, 2018 UEFA U-17, and several matches of UEFA Euro 2020. A bid alongside Scotland, Wales, Ireland and Northern Ireland similar to their successful UEFA Euro 2028 bid was also proposed. The home nations of the United Kingdom (England, Northern Ireland, Scotland, and Wales) pushed their bid from 2031 to 2035 following the confirmation of hosting restrictions on 5 March 2025. On 3 April 2025, FIFA declared the United Kingdom bid the sole valid bid for 2035. Due to UEFA's boycott of FIFA competitions due to the FIFA Forward Enterprise proposal, it is unknown if an alternative host, which would have to be from CAF, will be selected if the boycott is maintained.

==== Evaluation report ====
On 11 November 2026, 12 days before the vote, the evaluation report was released. The joint bid from England, Northern Ireland, Scotland and Wales was deemed to have high-quality stadiums, considerable hosting experience and a relatively compact tournament footprint. Overall, the bid scored 4.3/5.

==== Evaluation score ====
2035 FIFA Women's World Cup evaluation report
Bidding nation(s)	Evaluation score
England, Northern Ireland, Scotland, Wales	4.3/5

=== Host selection ===
On 23 November 2026 in Zurich during the tenth extraordinary FIFA Congress, FIFA will announce the host for the 2035 FIFA Women's World Cup.

2026 Extraordinary FIFA Congress 23 November 2026 – Zurich, Switzerland
Nation	Round 1
England, Northern Ireland, Scotland, Wales	Acclamation

== Withdrawn bids and other expressions of interest ==
=== China ===
In October 2022, the General Administration of Sport of China and the Chinese Football Association announced a new women's football program that would include a bid to host the 2031 FIFA Women's World Cup. In 2024, the two SARs of Hong Kong and Macau have also expressed interest in joining the Chinese bid even though they currently have separate FAs (HKFA and AFM). The country previously hosted the inaugural tournament in 1991 and they won the rights to host the 2003 edition, but it was instead hosted by the United States due to the SARS epidemic. The 2007 edition was automatically awarded to China by FIFA as compensation. Other FIFA and AFC tournaments that China has hosted include the 1985 U-17 World Cup, 1997 AFC Women's Championship, 2004 AFC Asian Cup, 2004 AFC U-19 Women's Championship, 2007 AFC U-19 Women's Championship, 2009 AFC U-19 Women's Championship, 2010 AFC U-19 Championship, 2011 AFC U-16 Women's Championship, 2015 AFC U-16 Women's Championship, 2015 AFC U-19 Women's Championship, 2017 AFC U-19 Women's Championship, and 2018 AFC U-23 Championship. The bid was rendered ineligible on 5 March 2025.

=== Japan ===
On 5 August 2024, the newly elected president of the Japan Football Association Tsuneyasu Miyamoto expressed the country's interest of hosting the 2031 FIFA Women's World Cup. Japan previously co-hosted the 2002 FIFA World Cup, and other FIFA and AFC tournaments Japan has hosted include the 1979 FIFA World Youth Championship, 1991 AFC Women's Championship, 1992 AFC Asian Cup, 1993 FIFA U-17 World Championship, 2001 FIFA Confederations Cup, 2004 AFC U-17 Championship, 2012 FIFA U-20 Women's World Cup, the men's and women's tournament at the 2020 Summer Olympics, and eight editions of the FIFA Club World Cup. The bid was rendered ineligible on 5 March 2025. Japan later committed to a 2039 bid.

=== Morocco–Portugal–Spain ===
In May 2023, former mayor of Barcelona Ada Colau proposed a bid for Barcelona to host the 2031 FIFA Women's World Cup. Following the victory in the 2023 FIFA Women's World Cup, Second Deputy Prime Minister and Minister of Labor Yolanda Díaz proposed a World Cup bid to Prime Minister Pedro Sánchez. Spain's previous FIFA Tournament hosting experience includes the 1982 FIFA World Cup, the 1964 Euro, the 1957, the 1972, 1994 UEFA U-18 Cups, the 1996 UEFA U-21 Cup, the 1988 UEFA U-16 Cup and the upcoming 2030 FIFA World Cup. Spain pushed their bid back to 2035 following the hosting restrictions and announced on March 28, 2025, that they intended to bid alongside Portugal and Morocco (the latter of which already had their own separate bid), similar to their 2030 FIFA World Cup bid. Besides the 2030 FIFA World Cup, Morocco also hosted the 1988 African Cup of Nations, the 2013, the 2014 and the 2022 editions of FIFA Club World Cup, 2018 African Nations Championship, the 2022 Women's Africa Cup of Nations, the 2023 U-23 Africa Cup of Nations, many tournaments under the UNAF banner, the 2024 Women's Africa Cup of Nations, the 2025 Africa Cup of Nations, and they will host the next five FIFA U-17 Women's World Cups from 2025 to 2029. Besides the 2030 FIFA World Cup, Portugal has hosted the 1961 U-19, the 1991 FIFA U-20 World Cup, the 2003 UEFA U-17, the UEFA Euro 2004, the 2006 UEFA U-21, and the 2019 UEFA Nations League Finals. The bid was rendered invalid on 3 April 2025. It was later revealed that Spain and Portugal wanted to bid, but Morocco had no interest in bidding so the Europeans decided against filing an application. The three are planning to bid for the 2039 Women's World Cup.

=== Saudi Arabia ===
In December 2023, Saudi Arabia announced that they had shown an interest in hosting the 2035 FIFA Women's World Cup following the launch of their 2034 FIFA World Cup bid (which was ultimately successful) as well as the Saudi Arabia women's national football team and the Saudi Women's Premier League in 2022. Saudi Arabia has hosted the 1989 FIFA U-20 World Cup, the 1992, 1995, and 1997 FIFA Confederations Cup, the 1992 AFC U-17 Championship, the 2008 AFC U-20 Championship, the 2023 FIFA Club World Cup, the 2025 AFC U-17 Asian Cup, and the 2027 AFC Asian Cup as well as multiple regional and club competitions. The bid was rendered ineligible on 5 March 2025.

=== South Africa ===
On 24 November 2023, the South Africa Football Association announced the withdrawal of its bid for the 2027 edition in favor of a 2031 bid. South Africa has previously hosted the 1996 AFCON, 2000 WAFCON, 2004 WAFCON, 2009 FIFA Confederations Cup, 2010 WAFCON, 2010 FIFA World Cup, 2011 U-20 AFCON, 2013 AFCON, and the 2014 CHAN. The bid was rendered invalid on 3 April 2025.
