= 1992 UEFA European Under-18 Championship qualifying =

Football tournament qualifying stage

This article features the 1992 UEFA European Under-18 Championship qualifying stage. Matches were played 1990 through 1992. Eight group winners qualified for the main tournament in Germany.

== Group 1 ==
Teams	Pld	W	D	L	GF	GA	GD	Pts
Turkey	6	3	3	0	8	2	+6	9
Israel	6	3	2	1	8	5	+3	8
Greece	6	1	2	3	5	7	–2	4
Switzerland	6	1	1	4	3	10	–7	3

Greece	1–1	Switzerland
Israel	2–0	Switzerland
Turkey	1–1	Israel
Greece	2–0	Israel
Switzerland	0–1	Israel
Turkey	1–0	Greece
Switzerland	0–4	Turkey
Switzerland	2–1	Greece
Greece	0–0	Turkey
Turkey	1–0	Switzerland
Israel	3–1	Greece
Israel	1–1	Turkey

== Group 2 ==
Teams	Pld	W	D	L	GF	GA	GD	Pts
Hungary	6	4	0	2	11	6	+5	8
Cyprus	6	4	0	2	10	9	+1	8
Romania	6	3	1	2	8	8	0	7
Bulgaria	6	0	1	5	4	10	–6	1

Hungary	1–0	Romania
Hungary	0–1	Cyprus
Cyprus	3–1	Bulgaria
Romania	3–2	Cyprus
Bulgaria	0–1	Cyprus
Cyprus	0–5	Hungary
Romania	3–1	Hungary
Romania	1–1	Bulgaria
Hungary	2–1	Bulgaria
Bulgaria	1–2	Hungary
Bulgaria	0–1	Romania
Cyprus	3–0	Romania

== Group 3 ==
Teams	Pld	W	D	L	GF	GA	GD	Pts
Portugal	6	4	2	0	18	1	+17	10
France	6	4	1	1	11	5	+6	9
Denmark	6	2	1	3	13	7	+6	5
Luxembourg	6	0	0	6	2	31	–29	0

Denmark	7–0	Luxembourg
Portugal	0–0	France
France	2–0	Denmark
Luxembourg	0–5	Portugal
France	0–3	Portugal
Portugal	3–0	Denmark
Luxembourg	0–5	France
Denmark	1–2	France
Portugal	7–1	Luxembourg
France	2–1	Luxembourg
Denmark	0–0	Portugal
Luxembourg	0–5	Denmark

== Group 4 ==
Teams	Pld	W	D	L	GF	GA	GD	Pts
Germany	6	4	2	0	13	3	+10	10
Italy	6	3	3	0	15	2	+13	9
Spain	6	0	3	3	2	9	–7	3
Malta	6	0	2	4	1	17	–16	2

Italy	9–0	Malta
Spain	0–2	Italy
Malta	1–1	Spain
Malta	0–1	Germany
Italy	0–0	Spain
Germany	4–0	Malta
Spain	1–3	Germany
Germany	0–0	Italy
Spain	0–0	Malta
Italy	2–2	Germany
Germany	3–0	Spain
Malta	0–2	Italy

== Group 5 ==
Teams	Pld	W	D	L	GF	GA	GD	Pts
England	6	4	1	1	9	4	+5	9
Belgium	6	2	3	1	6	4	+2	7
Iceland	6	1	3	2	7	8	–1	5
Wales	6	0	3	3	2	8	–6	3

Iceland	2–3	England
Belgium	1–1	Iceland
England	0–0	Belgium
Wales	1–1	Belgium
Wales	0–1	England
England	3–0	Wales
Iceland	0–0	Wales
Wales	1–1	Iceland
England	2–1	Iceland
Iceland	2–1	Belgium
Belgium	1–0	England
Belgium	2–0	Wales

== Group 6 ==
Teams	Pld	W	D	L	GF	GA	GD	Pts
Poland	6	6	0	0	15	0	+15	12
Republic of Ireland	6	3	1	2	9	12	–3	7
Northern Ireland	6	0	3	3	4	10	–6	3
Scotland	6	0	2	4	4	10	–6	2

Northern Ireland	0–2	Republic of Ireland
Poland	1–0	Scotland
Republic of Ireland	2–1	Scotland
Poland	3–0	Northern Ireland
Scotland	0–0	Northern Ireland
Scotland	1–3	Republic of Ireland
Poland	5–0	Republic of Ireland
Republic of Ireland	0–3	Poland
Northern Ireland	0–1	Poland
Scotland	0–2	Poland
Republic of Ireland	2–2	Northern Ireland
Northern Ireland	2–2	Scotland

== Group 7 ==
Teams	Pld	W	D	L	GF	GA	GD	Pts
Norway	6	4	0	2	12	4	+8	8
Finland	6	4	0	2	8	5	+3	8
Netherlands	6	3	0	3	8	10	–2	6
Austria	6	1	0	5	4	13	–9	2

Finland	0–2	Norway
Norway	4–1	Netherlands
Netherlands	0–3	Finland
Netherlands	2–0	Norway
Norway	1–0	Austria
Finland	0–3	Austria
Norway	0–1	Finland
Austria	0–2	Finland
Austria	0–5	Norway
Finland	2–0	Netherlands
Austria	0–1	Netherlands
Netherlands	4–1	Austria

== Group 8 ==
Teams	Pld	W	D	L	GF	GA	GD	Pts
Soviet Union	6	3	2	1	15	9	+6	8
Yugoslavia	6	2	2	2	12	13	–1	6
Czechoslovakia	6	1	4	1	7	8	–1	6
Sweden	6	0	4	2	10	14	–4	4

Yugoslavia	3–2	Soviet Union
Czechoslovakia	2–2	Sweden
Soviet Union	3–0	Czechoslovakia
Sweden	1–1	Yugoslavia
Sweden	2–2	Soviet Union
Czechoslovakia	2–0	Yugoslavia
Sweden	1–1	Czechoslovakia
Soviet Union	4–2	Yugoslavia
Yugoslavia	6–4	Sweden
Yugoslavia	0–0	Czechoslovakia
Soviet Union	2–0	Sweden
Czechoslovakia	2–2	Soviet Union

== See also ==
- 1992 UEFA European Under-18 Championship
