= 1986 UEFA European Under-18 Championship qualifying =

Football tournament qualification stage

This article features the 1986 UEFA European Under-18 Championship qualifying stage. Matches were played 1984 through 1986. Eight group winners qualified for the main tournament in Yugoslavia.

It was the first time only eight teams could enter the main tournament, which means the qualifying stage became more extensive. Qualifications had been organised for several years, but these were on a smaller scale, since there was still room for sixteen teams in the main tournament.

== Group 1 ==
Teams	Pld	W	D	L	GF	GA	GD	Pts
Scotland	6	5	1	0	12	3	+9	11
Republic of Ireland	6	3	1	2	6	5	+1	7
England	6	3	0	3	14	10	+4	6
Iceland	6	0	0	6	4	18	–14	0

England	5–3	Iceland
England	1–2	Scotland
Republic of Ireland	1–0	England
Scotland	1–1	Republic of Ireland
Iceland	0–2	Scotland
Iceland	1–2	Republic of Ireland
Iceland	0–5	England
Republic of Ireland	2–0	Iceland
Scotland	2–0	Iceland
Republic of Ireland	0–1	Scotland
England	2–0	Republic of Ireland
Scotland	4–1	England

== Group 2 ==
Teams	Pld	W	D	L	GF	GA	GD	Pts
Belgium	6	2	4	0	11	7	+4	8
Netherlands	6	3	2	1	11	9	+2	8
Wales	6	2	2	2	9	8	+1	6
Northern Ireland	6	0	2	4	5	12	–7	2

Belgium	3–1	Netherlands
Northern Ireland	1–2	Wales
Wales	0–1	Netherlands
Netherlands	2–1	Northern Ireland
Belgium	0–0	Northern Ireland
Wales	3–3	Belgium
Netherlands	2–2	Belgium
Wales	3–0	Northern Ireland
Northern Ireland	1–1	Belgium
Netherlands	1–1	Wales
Belgium	2–0	Wales
Northern Ireland	2–4	Netherlands

== Group 3 ==
Teams	Pld	W	D	L	GF	GA	GD	Pts
Yugoslavia	6	4	1	1	21	4	+17	9
France	6	3	3	0	20	3	+17	9
Spain	6	2	2	2	7	8	–1	6
Luxembourg	6	0	0	6	1	34	–33	0

Yugoslavia	3–0	Spain
Luxembourg	0–4	France
Yugoslavia	8–0	Luxembourg
Yugoslavia	1–2	France
Spain	3–0	Luxembourg
France	1–1	Spain
Luxembourg	0–1	Spain
Luxembourg	1–6	Yugoslavia
Spain	1–1	France
France	0–0	Yugoslavia
Spain	1–3	Yugoslavia
France	12–0	Luxembourg

== Group 4 ==
Teams	Pld	W	D	L	GF	GA	GD	Pts
Italy	6	5	0	1	19	4	+15	10
Austria	6	4	0	2	18	10	+8	8
Portugal	6	3	0	3	12	8	+4	6
Malta	6	0	0	6	0	27	–27	0

Portugal	0–2	Italy
Malta	0–2	Portugal
Portugal	0–3	Austria
Malta	0–5	Italy
Austria	3–0	Malta
Austria	2–1	Italy
Portugal	6–0	Malta
Austria	1–4	Portugal
Italy	4–0	Malta
Italy	2–0	Portugal
Malta	0–7	Austria
Italy	5–2	Austria

== Group 5 ==
Teams	Pld	W	D	L	GF	GA	GD	Pts
West Germany	6	6	0	0	15	2	+13	12
Switzerland	5	1	2	2	5	7	–2	4
Poland	5	0	3	2	3	8	–5	3
Denmark	6	0	3	3	6	12	–6	3

Switzerland	3–1	Denmark
West Germany	2–0	Switzerland
Switzerland	1–1	Poland
Denmark	1–3	West Germany
Poland	0–2	West Germany
Poland	0–0	Denmark
Denmark	1–1	Switzerland
Switzerland	0–2	West Germany
Denmark	2–2	Poland
West Germany	3–1	Denmark
West Germany	3–0	Poland
Poland	not played	Switzerland

== Group 6 ==
Teams	Pld	W	D	L	GF	GA	GD	Pts
East Germany	6	4	2	0	7	2	+5	10
Sweden	6	3	2	1	8	3	+5	8
Finland	6	1	1	4	5	10	–5	3
Norway	6	1	1	4	3	8	–5	3

Norway	0–1	Sweden
Finland	0–1	Norway
East Germany	1–0	Norway
East Germany	2–1	Sweden
Finland	0–1	East Germany
Sweden	1–1	Finland
Sweden	1–0	Norway
Norway	1–4	Finland
East Germany	2–0	Finland
Finland	0–4	Sweden
Norway	1–1	East Germany
Sweden	0–0	East Germany

== Group 7 ==
Teams	Pld	W	D	L	GF	GA	GD	Pts
Bulgaria	6	4	1	1	19	6	+13	9
Hungary	6	4	0	2	10	3	+7	8
Greece	6	3	1	2	11	12	–1	7
Cyprus	6	0	0	6	5	24	–19	0

Cyprus	1–4	Hungary
Cyprus	1–5	Bulgaria
Cyprus	1–4	Greece
Bulgaria	0–2	Hungary
Hungary	2–0	Greece
Bulgaria	5–1	Greece
Greece	2–2	Bulgaria
Hungary	0–1	Bulgaria
Greece	3–2	Cyprus
Greece	1–0	Hungary
Bulgaria	6–0	Cyprus
Hungary	2–0	Cyprus

== Group 8 ==
Teams	Pld	W	D	L	GF	GA	GD	Pts
Romania	6	4	1	1	10	5	+5	9
Czechoslovakia	6	2	2	2	6	6	0	6
Soviet Union	6	1	3	2	8	8	0	5
Turkey	6	1	2	3	3	8	–5	4

Turkey	0–1	Romania
Czechoslovakia	1–0	Turkey
Czechoslovakia	2–0	Romania
Turkey	1–1	Soviet Union
Romania	3–2	Soviet Union
Soviet Union	2–0	Czechoslovakia
Czechoslovakia	2–2	Soviet Union
Romania	1–0	Czechoslovakia
Romania	4–0	Turkey
Turkey	1–1	Czechoslovakia
Soviet Union	1–1	Romania
Soviet Union	0–1	Turkey

== See also ==
- 1986 UEFA European Under-18 Championship
