= 1974 UEFA European Under-18 Championship =

Tournament details
- Host country: Sweden
- Dates: 22–31 May
- Teams: 16

Final positions
- Champions: Bulgaria (3rd title)
- Runners-up: Yugoslavia
- Third place: Scotland
- Fourth place: Greece

The UEFA European Under-18 Championship 1974 Final Tournament was held in Sweden.

== Qualification ==
=== Groups 1-10 ===
Team 1	Agg.	Team 2	1st leg	2nd leg
Austria	1–4	Bulgaria	0–2	1–2
West Germany	1–2	Romania	1–0	0–2
Malta	1–11	Greece	1–4	0–7
Belgium	2–2(a)	Scotland	1–2	1–0
Republic of Ireland	6–6(a)	Iceland	4–3	2–3
Norway	0–4	Denmark	0–2	0–2
Portugal	6–1	Switzerland	5–1	1–0
Hungary	0–4	Yugoslavia	0–1	0–3
East Germany	(a)1–1	France	0–0	1–1
Italy	1–2	Spain	1–1	0–1

=== Group 11 ===
Teams	Pld	W	D	L	GF	GA	GD	Pts
Wales	4	2	1	1	4	1	+3	5
England	4	2	1	1	3	2	+1	5
Netherlands	4	0	2	2	1	5	–4	2

Netherlands	0–0	Wales
Wales	3–0	Netherlands
England	1–0	Wales
England	1–1	Netherlands
Netherlands	0–1	England
Wales	1–0	England

=== Group 12 ===
Teams	Pld	W	D	L	GF	GA	GD	Pts
Poland	4	2	1	1	4	2	+2	5
Czechoslovakia	4	2	0	2	3	3	0	4
Soviet Union	4	1	1	2	1	3	–2	3

Czechoslovakia	0–2	Poland
Soviet Union	1–0	Czechoslovakia
Poland	0–2	Czechoslovakia
Soviet Union	0–0	Poland
Czechoslovakia	1–0	Soviet Union
Poland	2–0	Soviet Union

== Teams ==
The following teams qualified for the tournament:

- Bulgaria
- Denmark
- East Germany
- Finland (received Bye for qualifying stage)
- Greece
- Iceland
- Luxembourg (received Bye for qualifying stage)
- Poland
- Portugal
- Romania
- Scotland
- Spain
- Sweden (host)
- Turkey (received Bye for qualifying stage)
- Wales
- Yugoslavia

== Group stage ==
=== Group A ===
Teams	Pld	W	D	L	GF	GA	GD	Pts
Scotland	3	2	1	0	10	3	+7	5
Romania	3	2	0	1	4	3	+1	4
Finland	3	1	0	2	1	7	–6	2
Iceland	3	0	1	2	1	3	–2	1

22 May	Scotland	1–1	Iceland
	Romania	1–0	Finland
24 May	Scotland	6–0	Finland
	Romania	1–0	Iceland
26 May	Finland	1–0	Iceland
	Scotland	3–2	Romania

=== Group B ===
Teams	Pld	W	D	L	GF	GA	GD	Pts
Yugoslavia	3	2	1	0	3	1	+2	5
East Germany	3	2	0	1	3	1	+2	4
Poland	3	1	0	2	3	4	–1	2
Turkey	3	0	1	2	1	4	–3	1

22 May	Turkey	0–0	Yugoslavia
	East Germany	1–0	Poland
24 May	Yugoslavia	1–0	East Germany
	Poland	2–1	Turkey
26 May	East Germany	2–0	Turkey
	Yugoslavia	2–1	Poland

=== Group C ===
Teams	Pld	W	D	L	GF	GA	GD	Pts
Bulgaria	3	2	1	0	5	3	+2	5
Denmark	3	2	0	1	9	4	+5	4
Wales	3	1	1	1	6	3	+3	3
Luxembourg	3	0	0	3	1	11	–10	0

22 May	Denmark	3–1	Wales
	Bulgaria	2–1	Luxembourg
24 May	Bulgaria	3–2	Denmark
	Wales	5–0	Luxembourg
26 May	Denmark	4–0	Luxembourg
	Wales	0–0	Bulgaria

=== Group D ===
Teams	Pld	W	D	L	GF	GA	GD	Pts
Greece	3	2	1	0	4	2	+2	5
Sweden	3	1	1	1	4	4	0	3
Spain	3	1	1	1	2	2	0	3
Portugal	3	0	1	2	0	2	–2	1

22 May	Greece	1–0	Spain
	Sweden	1–0	Portugal
24 May	Greece	0–0	Portugal
	Spain	1–1	Sweden
26 May	Spain	1–0	Portugal
	Greece	3–2	Sweden

== Semi-finals ==
29 May 1974

Bulgaria	1 – 0	Scotland

Helsingborg
29 May 1974

Yugoslavia	1 – 0	Greece

Landskrona

== Third place match ==
31 May 1974

Scotland	1 – 0	Greece

Lund

== Final ==
31 May 1974

Bulgaria	1 – 0	Yugoslavia

Malmö

1974 UEFA European Under-18 Championship

Bulgaria
Third title
