= 1968 UEFA European Under-18 Championship =

Tournament details
- Host country: France
- Dates: 7–15 April
- Teams: 16

Final positions
- Champions: Czechoslovakia (1st title)
- Runners-up: France
- Third place: Portugal
- Fourth place: Bulgaria

The UEFA European Under-18 Championship 1968 Final Tournament was held in France.

== Qualification ==
Team 1	Agg.	Team 2	1st leg	2nd leg
Austria	2–3	Yugoslavia	1–0	1–3
Poland	3–5	East Germany	3–2	0–3
Romania	2–5	Hungary	2–1	0–4
Turkey	0–1	Bulgaria	0–0	0–1
Malta	1–3	Italy	1–2	0–1
Luxembourg	0–11	Belgium	0–4	0–7
West Germany	2–1	Spain	1–0	1–1
Republic of Ireland	1–4	England	0–0	1–4

== Teams ==
The following teams entered the tournament. Eight teams qualified (Q) and eight teams entered without playing qualification matches.

- Belgium (Q)
- Bulgaria (Q)
- Czechoslovakia
- East Germany (Q)
- England (Q)
- France (host)
- West Germany (Q)
- Greece
- Hungary (Q)
- Italy (Q)
- Netherlands
- Portugal
- Scotland
- Soviet Union
- Switzerland
- Yugoslavia (Q)

== Group stage ==
=== Group A ===
Teams	Pld	W	D	L	GF	GA	GD	Pts
Portugal	3	3	0	0	4	0	+4	6
Scotland	3	2	0	1	6	2	+4	4
Belgium	3	0	1	2	1	4	–3	1
Switzerland	3	0	1	2	1	6	–5	1

7 April	Switzerland	1–1	Belgium
	Portugal	2–0	Scotland
9 April	Scotland	4–0	Switzerland
	Portugal	1–0	Belgium
11 April	Scotland	2–0	Belgium
	Portugal	1–0	Switzerland

=== Group B ===
Teams	Pld	W	D	L	GF	GA	GD	Pts
Bulgaria	3	2	1	0	4	1	+3	5
England	3	1	2	0	2	1	+1	4
Soviet Union	3	0	2	1	3	4	–1	2
Netherlands	3	0	1	2	3	6	–3	1

7 April	Soviet Union	2–2	Netherlands
	Bulgaria	0–0	England
9 April	Bulgaria	1–0	Soviet Union
	England	1–0	Netherlands
11 April	Bulgaria	3–1	Netherlands
	England	1–1	Soviet Union

=== Group C ===
Teams	Pld	W	D	L	GF	GA	GD	Pts
Czechoslovakia	3	2	0	1	5	3	+2	4
Italy	3	1	1	1	4	4	0	3
Yugoslavia	3	1	1	1	3	4	–1	3
West Germany	3	1	0	2	3	4	–1	2

7 April	Czechoslovakia	2–0	Yugoslavia
	West Germany	2–0	Italy
9 April	Yugoslavia	1–0	West Germany
	Italy	2–0	Czechoslovakia
11 April	Czechoslovakia	3–1	West Germany
	Italy	2–2	Yugoslavia

=== Group D ===
Teams	Pld	W	D	L	GF	GA	GD	Pts
France	3	2	1	0	7	3	+4	5
Hungary	3	2	0	1	6	5	+1	4
Greece	3	0	2	1	2	3	–1	2
East Germany	3	0	1	2	5	9	–4	1

7 April	East Germany	1–1	Greece
	France	3–0	Hungary
9 April	Hungary	4–1	East Germany
	France	0–0	Greece
11 April	France	4–3	East Germany
	Hungary	2–1	Greece

== Semifinals ==
13 April 1968

Czechoslovakia	3 – 1	Portugal

Cannes
13 April 1968

France	3 – 1	Bulgaria

Nice

== Third place match ==
15 April 1968

Portugal	4 – 2	Bulgaria

Cannes

== Final ==
15 April 1968

Czechoslovakia	2 – 1	France

Cannes

1968 UEFA European Under-18 Championship

Czechoslovakia
First title
