= Finland national under-18 football team =

Finland Under-18
- Association: Football Association of Finland
- Confederation: UEFA (Europe)
- Head coach: Peter Lundberg (Åland)
- Most caps: Valmir Seferi (15)
- Top scorer: Vahid Hambo (5)
- FIFA code: FIN

FIFA ranking
- Current: 93

The Finland national under-18 football team are a feeder team for the main Finland national football team.

== UEFA European Under-18 Championship ==
=== UEFA European Under-18 Championship ===
| UEFA European Under-18 Championship record | | | | | | | | UEFA European Under-18 Championship Qualification/Elite record | | | | | | |
| Year | Round | Pld | W | D * | L | GF | GA | Position | Pld | W | D * | L | GF | GA |
|---|---|---|---|---|---|---|---|---|---|---|---|---|---|---|
| 1948–1962 | Did not enter | | | | | | | Did not enter | | | | | | |
| (England) 1963 | Did not qualify | | | | | | | Qualifying Round | 1 | 0 | 0 | 1 | 0 | 2 |
| 1964–1968 | Did not enter | | | | | | | Did not enter | | | | | | |
| (East Germany) 1969 | Did not qualify | | | | | | | Qualifying Round | 2 | 0 | 0 | 2 | 1 | 8 |
| (Scotland) 1970 | Group stage | 3 | 1 | 0 | 2 | 2 | 7 | Received Bye for qualifying round | | | | | | |
| (Czechoslovakia) 1971 | Did not qualify | | | | | | | Qualifying Round | 2 | 0 | 0 | 2 | 1 | 8 |
| (Spain) 1972 | Did not qualify | | | | | | | Qualifying Round | 2 | 0 | 2 (a) | 0 | 3 | 3 |
| (Italy) 1973 | Did not qualify | | | | | | | Qualifying Round | 2 | 0 | 1 | 1 | 0 | 1 |
| (Sweden) 1974 | Group stage | 3 | 1 | 0 | 2 | 1 | 7 | Received Bye for qualifying round | | | | | | |
| (Switzerland) 1975 | Final | 5 | 2 | 2 | 1 | 4 | 3 | Qualifying Round | 2 | 1 | 1 | 0 | 1 | 0 |
| (Hungary) 1976 | Group stage | 3 | 0 | 1 | 2 | 1 | 3 | Qualifying Round | 2 | 1 | 1 | 0 | 3 | 1 |
| (Belgium) 1977 | Did not qualify | | | | | | | Qualifying Round | 4 | 0 | 1 | 3 | 5 | 12 |
| (Poland) 1978 | Did not qualify | | | | | | | Qualifying Round | 4 | 0 | 3 | 1 | 4 | 6 |
| (Austria) 1979 | Did not qualify | | | | | | | Qualifying Round | 2 | 0 | 0 | 2 | 0 | 5 |
| (East Germany) 1980 | Group stage | 3 | 0 | 0 | 3 | 3 | 11 | Qualifying Round | 2 | 2 | 0 | 0 | 5 | 1 |
| (West Germany) 1981 | Did not qualify | | | | | | | Qualifying Round | 2 | 0 | 1 | 1 | 1 | 2 |
| (Finland) 1982 | Group stage | 3 | 1 | 1 | 1 | 5 | 5 | Qualified as host | | | | | | |
| (England) 1983 | Did not qualify | | | | | | | Qualifying Round | 2 | 0 | 1 | 1 | 1 | 2 |
| (Soviet Union) 1984 | Did not qualify | | | | | | | Qualification Round | 2 | 1 | 0 | 1 | 2 | 3 |
| (Socialist Federal Republic of Yugoslavia) 1986 | Did not qualify | | | | | | | Qualification Round | 6 | 1 | 1 | 4 | 5 | 10 |
| (Czechoslovakia) 1988 | Did not qualify | | | | | | | Qualification Round | 6 | 0 | 3 | 3 | 3 | 9 |
| (Hungary) 1990 | Did not qualify | | | | | | | Qualification Round | 6 | 2 | 1 | 3 | 12 | 8 |
| (Germany) 1992 | Did not qualify | | | | | | | Qualification Round | 6 | 4 | 0 | 2 | 8 | 5 |
| (England) 1993 | Did not qualify | | | | | | | Qualification Round | 4 | 1 | 1 | 2 | 7 | 8 |
| (Spain) 1994 | Did not qualify | | | | | | | Qualification Round | 4 | 2 | 1 | 1 | 6 | 4 |
| (Greece) 1995 | Did not qualify | | | | | | | Qualification Round | 2 | 0 | 0 | 2 | 9 | 3 |
| (France) 1996 | Did not qualify | | | | | | | Qualification Round | 4 | 0 | 0 | 4 | 4 | 13 |
| (Iceland) 1997 | Did not qualify | | | | | | | Qualification Round | 2 | 1 | 0 | 1 | 2 | 1 |
| (Cyprus) 1998 | Did not qualify | | | | | | | Qualification Round | 3 | 2 | 0 | 1 | 9 | 7 |
| (Sweden) 1999 | Did not qualify | | | | | | | Qualification Round | 3 | 1 | 1 | 1 | 5 | 3 |
| (Germany) 2000 | Group stage | 3 | 1 | 1 | 1 | 5 | 5 | Elite Round | 3 | 1 | 0 | 2 | 3 | 6 |
| (Finland) 2001 | Group stage | 3 | 0 | 1 | 2 | 6 | 13 | Qualified as host | | | | | | |
| 2002- | See Finland national under-19 football team | | | | | | | | | | | | | |

== Competitive record ==
=== FIFA World Youth Championship ===
- 2001 Group stage

=== UEFA European Youth Tournament ===
- 1975 runners-up

== Players ==
=== Current squad ===
- The following players were called up for the 2027 UEFA European Under-19 Championship qualification matches.
- Match dates: 25, 28 and 31 March 2026
- Opposition: Ukraine, Estonia, Czech Republic
- Caps and goals correct as of: 9 March 2026

| No. | Pos. | Player | Date of birth (age) | Caps | Goals | Club |
|---|---|---|---|---|---|---|
| | GK | Niki Hasselman | 25 February 2008 (age 18) | 0 | 0 | (Football Association of Finland) SJK |
| | GK | Kasperi Silen | 17 February 2009 (age 17) | 0 | 0 | (Football Association of Finland) KuPS |
| | DF | Roope Aho | 30 May 2008 (age 18) | 0 | 0 | (Football Association of Finland) Ilves |
| | DF | Eetu Grönlund | 8 August 2008 (age 18) | 0 | 0 | (Football Association of Finland) HJK |
| | DF | Musa Hietakangas | 9 September 2008 (age 18) | 0 | 0 | (Football Association of Finland) FC Inter |
| | DF | Miska Laaksonen | 29 February 2008 (age 18) | 0 | 0 | (Football Association of Finland) Ilves |
| | DF | Iivo Nybäck | 9 August 2008 (age 18) | 0 | 0 | (Football Association of Finland) HJK |
| | DF | Luka Puhakainen | 3 March 2008 (age 18) | 0 | 0 | (Football Association of Finland) KTP |
| | DF | Eerik Salmivuori | 8 November 2008 (age 18) | 0 | 0 | (Football Association of Finland) SJK |
| | MF | Ahti Haikala | 25 February 2008 (age 18) | 0 | 0 | (Football Association of Finland) HJK |
| | MF | Eeli Kiiskilä | 5 January 2008 (age 18) | 0 | 0 | (Football Association of Finland) FC Inter |
| | MF | Valtteri Lehtomäki | 4 April 2008 (age 18) | 0 | 0 | (Football Association of Finland) Ilves |
| | MF | Eze Onuoha | 19 December 2008 (age 17) | 0 | 0 | (Football Association of Finland) SJK |
| | MF | Leevi Palmula | 23 February 2008 (age 18) | 0 | 0 | (Football Association of Finland) HJK |
| | FW | Bruno Katz | 14 May 2008 (age 18) | 0 | 0 | (German Football Association) VfL Wolfsburg |
| | FW | Abdu Muchipay | 5 March 2008 (age 18) | 0 | 0 | (Football Association of Finland) SJK |
| | FW | Osagie Okungbowa | 6 August 2008 (age 18) | 0 | 0 | (German Football Association) SC Freiburg |
| | FW | Philip Otoo | 9 November 2008 (age 18) | 0 | 0 | (Football Association of Finland) FC Inter |
| | FW | Noah Rantasalmi | 13 July 2008 (age 18) | 0 | 0 | (Football Association of Finland) SJK |
| | FW | Nicholas Vainio | 11 September 2008 (age 18) | 0 | 0 | (Swedish Football Association) Karlbergs BK |

=== Recent call-ups ===
The following players have also been called up during the last twelve months and remain eligible for selection.

| Pos. | Player | Date of birth (age) | Caps | Goals | Club | Latest call-up |
|---|---|---|---|---|---|---|
| DF | Topias Töllinen | 16 December 2008 (age 17) | 0 | 0 | (Finland) SJK | v. Ukraine, 25 March 2026 |
| MF | Otto Tiitinen | 25 April 2008 (age 18) | 0 | 0 | (Finland) Ilves | v. Ukraine, 25 March 2026 |
