= 1977 UEFA European Under-18 Championship =

Tournament details
- Host country: Belgium
- Dates: 19–28 May
- Teams: 16

Final positions
- Champions: Belgium (1st title)
- Runners-up: Bulgaria
- Third place: Soviet Union
- Fourth place: West Germany

The UEFA European Under-18 Championship 1977 Final Tournament was held in Belgium. The team from Belgium defeated the team from Bulgaria in the Championship match to win the Championship.

== Qualification ==
=== Groups 1-12 ===
Team 1	Agg.	Team 2	1st leg	2nd leg
England	2–1	Wales	1–0	1–1
Iceland	2–1	Norway	1–0	1–1
Republic of Ireland	w.o.	Scotland		
Denmark	1–2	Northern Ireland	1–0	0–2
France	4–2	Luxembourg	1–1	3–1
West Germany	15–1	Liechtenstein	10–0	5–1
Portugal	1–1 (3–4p)	Austria	0–1	1–0
Czechoslovakia	1–2	Italy	0–2	1–0
Poland	0–1	Bulgaria	0–0	0–1
Romania	4–4(a)	Yugoslavia	4–2	0–2
Soviet Union	(a)2–2	Turkey	1–0	1–2
Hungary	1–4	Greece	1–0	0–4

=== Group 13 ===
Teams	Pld	W	D	L	GF	GA	GD	Pts
Netherlands	4	3	1	0	6	2	+4	7
Spain	4	1	2	1	5	3	+2	4
Switzerland	4	0	1	3	2	8	–6	1

Netherlands	1–0	Switzerland
Switzerland	0–0	Spain
Spain	1–2	Netherlands
Netherlands	0–0	Spain
Spain	4–1	Switzerland
Switzerland	1–3	Netherlands

=== Group 14 ===
Teams	Pld	W	D	L	GF	GA	GD	Pts
Sweden	4	3	0	1	10	6	+4	6
East Germany	4	2	1	1	9	6	+3	5
Finland	4	0	1	3	5	12	–7	1

Finland	2–2	East Germany
Finland	2–3	Sweden
Sweden	3–2	East Germany
East Germany	3–1	Finland
Sweden	4–0	Finland
East Germany	2–0	Sweden

== Teams ==
The following teams qualified for the tournament:

- Austria
- Belgium (host)
- Bulgaria
- England
- France
- West Germany
- Greece
- Iceland
- Italy
- Malta (did not have to qualify)
- Netherlands
- Northern Ireland
- Republic of Ireland
- Soviet Union
- Sweden
- Yugoslavia

== Group stage ==
=== Group A ===
Teams	Pld	W	D	L	GF	GA	GD	Pts
Belgium	3	2	0	1	9	2	+7	4
England	3	1	2	0	2	1	+1	4
Iceland	3	0	2	1	1	3	–2	2
Greece	3	0	2	1	3	9	–6	2

19 May	England	1–0	Belgium
	Iceland	1–1	Greece
21 May	England	0–0	Iceland
	Belgium	7–1	Greece
23 May	England	1–1	Greece
	Belgium	2–0	Iceland

=== Group B ===
Teams	Pld	W	D	L	GF	GA	GD	Pts
West Germany	3	1	2	0	3	2	+1	4
France	3	1	1	1	1	1	0	3
Republic of Ireland	3	1	1	1	2	4	–2	3
Yugoslavia	3	1	0	2	4	3	+1	2

19 May	Republic of Ireland	1–0	France
	West Germany	2–1	Yugoslavia
21 May	Yugoslavia	3–0	Republic of Ireland
	France	0–0	West Germany
23 May	Republic of Ireland	1–1	West Germany
	France	1–0	Yugoslavia

=== Group C ===
Teams	Pld	W	D	L	GF	GA	GD	Pts
Soviet Union	3	3	0	0	11	0	+11	6
Northern Ireland	3	2	0	1	3	1	+2	4
Austria	3	0	1	2	0	5	–5	1
Malta	3	0	1	2	0	8	–8	1

19 May	Austria	0–0	Malta
	Soviet Union	1–0	Northern Ireland
21 May	Soviet Union	4–0	Austria
	Northern Ireland	2–0	Malta
23 May	Northern Ireland	1–0	Austria
	Soviet Union	6–0	Malta

=== Group D ===
Teams	Pld	W	D	L	GF	GA	GD	Pts
Bulgaria	3	2	0	1	6	3	+3	4
Sweden	3	2	0	1	4	5	–1	4
Italy	3	1	1	1	2	2	0	3
Netherlands	3	0	1	2	1	3	–2	1

19 May	Sweden	2–1	Netherlands
	Italy	2–1	Bulgaria
21 May	Netherlands	0–0	Italy
	Bulgaria	4–1	Sweden
23 May	Bulgaria	1–0	Netherlands
	Sweden	1–0	Italy

== Semifinals ==
26 May 1977

Belgium	1 – 1	Soviet Union
Penalties
	4 – 2

Antwerp
26 May 1977

Bulgaria	3 – 1	West Germany

Charleroi

== Third place match ==
28 May 1977

Soviet Union	7 – 2	West Germany

Brussels

== Final ==
28 May 1977

Belgium	2 – 1	Bulgaria

Brussels

1977 UEFA European Under-18 Championship

Belgium
First title
