= 1994 UEFA European Under-18 Championship qualifying =

Football tournament qualification stage

This article features the 1994 UEFA European Under-18 Championship qualifying stage. Matches were played from 1993 through 1994. Two qualifying rounds were organised and seven teams qualified for the main tournament, joining host Spain.

This year became the first appearance of several teams from the republics of the former Soviet Union, including Latvia, Estonia, Belarus, Lithuania, Ukraine, Georgia, and Armenia, as well as the former Yugoslavia (barred from competitions last year), such as Croatia, FR Yugoslavia (withdrew), and Slovenia. In addition to the Eastern European teams, the competition was joined for the first time by San Marino.

== Round 1 ==
=== Group 1 ===
Teams	Pld	W	D	L	GF	GA	GD	Pts
Russia	4	3	1	0	12	3	+9	7
Finland	4	2	1	1	6	4	+2	5
Latvia	4	0	0	4	1	12	–11	0

Latvia	0–2	Finland
Latvia	0–3	Russia
Finland	2–2	Russia
Finland	2–0	Latvia
Russia	2–0	Finland
Russia	5–1	Latvia

=== Group 2 ===
All matches were played in Wales.

Teams	Pld	W	D	L	GF	GA	GD	Pts
Iceland	2	2	0	0	9	1	+8	4
Wales	2	1	0	1	2	2	0	2
Estonia	2	0	0	2	0	8	–8	0

Wales	1–2	Iceland
Iceland	7–0	Estonia
Estonia	0–1	Wales

=== Group 3 ===
All matches were played in Northern Ireland.

Teams	Pld	W	D	L	GF	GA	GD	Pts
Belarus	2	0	2	0	2	2	0	2
Lithuania	2	0	2	0	1	1	0	2
Northern Ireland	2	0	2	0	1	1	0	2

Northern Ireland	1–1	Belarus
Northern Ireland	0–0	Lithuania
Belarus	1–1	Lithuania

=== Group 4 ===
All matches were played in Malta.

Teams	Pld	W	D	L	GF	GA	GD	Pts
Croatia	2	2	0	0	12	1	+11	4
Malta	2	1	0	1	2	4	–2	2
San Marino	2	0	0	2	1	10	–9	0

Malta	2–0	San Marino
Malta	0–4	Croatia
San Marino	1–8	Croatia

=== Group 5 ===
Team 1	Agg.	Team 2	1st leg	2nd leg
Cyprus	1–3	Belgium	0–2	1–1

FR Yugoslavia withdrew.

=== Group 6 ===
All matches were played in Israel.

Teams	Pld	W	D	L	GF	GA	GD	Pts
Ukraine	2	1	0	1	5	3	+2	2
Israel	2	1	0	1	2	1	+1	2
Georgia	2	1	0	1	2	5	–3	2

Israel	2–0	Ukraine
Israel	0–1	Georgia
Ukraine	5–1	Georgia

=== Group 7 ===
All matches were played in Switzerland.

Teams	Pld	W	D	L	GF	GA	GD	Pts
Switzerland	2	1	1	0	10	1	+9	3
Turkey	2	1	1	0	6	1	+5	3
Armenia	2	0	0	2	0	14	–14	0

Turkey	5–0	Armenia
Turkey	1–1	Switzerland
Armenia	0–9	Switzerland

=== Group 8 ===
Teams	Pld	W	D	L	GF	GA	GD	Pts
Italy	4	3	0	1	12	6	+6	6
Bulgaria	4	2	1	1	5	4	+1	5
Slovenia	4	0	1	3	4	11	–7	1

Bulgaria	0–0	Slovenia
Slovenia	3–6	Italy
Italy	3–2	Bulgaria
Slovenia	1–2	Bulgaria
Italy	3–0	Slovenia
Bulgaria	1–0	Italy

=== Group 9 ===
Teams	Pld	W	D	L	GF	GA	GD	Pts
Netherlands	4	3	0	1	8	4	+4	6
Denmark	4	2	1	1	5	3	+2	5
Norway	4	0	1	3	3	9	–6	1

Norway	0–2	Denmark
Norway	1–2	Netherlands
Denmark	1–1	Norway
Netherlands	4–1	Norway
Denmark	0–1	Netherlands
Netherlands	1–2	Denmark

=== Group 10 ===
Teams	Pld	W	D	L	GF	GA	GD	Pts
Portugal	4	2	2	0	5	3	+2	6
Czechoslovakia	4	1	2	1	4	5	–1	4
Poland	4	1	0	3	4	5	–1	2

Czechoslovakia	1–0	Poland
Poland	3–1	Czechoslovakia
Poland	0–1	Portugal
Czechoslovakia	0–0	Portugal
Portugal	2–1	Poland
Portugal	2–2	Czechoslovakia

=== Group 11 ===
All matches were played in Sweden.

Teams	Pld	W	D	L	GF	GA	GD	Pts
Sweden	2	2	0	0	6	3	+3	4
Republic of Ireland	2	0	1	1	3	4	–1	1
Scotland	2	0	1	1	4	6	–2	1

Republic of Ireland	1–2	Sweden
Republic of Ireland	2–2	Scotland
Sweden	4–2	Scotland

=== Group 12 ===
Teams	Pld	W	D	L	GF	GA	GD	Pts
France	4	2	2	0	7	4	+3	6
Romania	4	0	3	1	3	4	–1	3
England	4	0	3	1	5	7	–2	3

England	1–1	Romania
Romania	0–1	France
Romania	1–1	England
France	2–0	England
France	1–1	Romania
England	3–3	France

=== Group 13 ===
Teams	Pld	W	D	L	GF	GA	GD	Pts
Hungary	4	3	1	0	12	2	+10	7
Austria	4	1	1	2	6	7	–1	3
Luxembourg	4	1	0	3	3	12	–9	2

Luxembourg	0–4	Hungary
Austria	0–2	Hungary
Hungary	2–2	Austria
Hungary	4–0	Luxembourg
Austria	3–0	Luxembourg
Luxembourg	3–1	Austria

=== Group 14 ===
Team 1	Agg.	Team 2	1st leg	2nd leg
Germany	6–4	Greece	4–2	2–2

== Round 2 ==
Team 1	Agg.	Team 2	1st leg	2nd leg
Iceland	1–10	Portugal	0–7	1–3
Russia	3–0	Italy	2–0	1–0
Hungary	1–2	Belarus	1–2	0–0
Sweden	2–1	Switzerland	0–0	2–1
Germany	0–0 (p: 4–2)	Belgium	0–0	0–0
Ukraine	2–2(a)	Netherlands	2–2	0–0
Croatia	0–3	France	0–0	0–3

26 April 1994

Ukraine	2–2	Netherlands
Shyshchenko 21'; Shevchenko 57'	Report	Wooter 45'; Seedorf 76'

Ukraina Stadium, Lviv
Attendance: 18,000
Referee: Veselin Bogdanov (Bulgaria)

== See also ==
- 1994 UEFA European Under-18 Championship
