= 1970 UEFA European Under-18 Championship =

Tournament details
- Host country: Scotland
- Dates: 16–25 May
- Teams: 16

Final positions
- Champions: East Germany (2nd title)
- Runners-up: Netherlands
- Third place: Scotland
- Fourth place: France

The UEFA European Under-18 Championship 1970 Final Tournament was held in Scotland.

== Qualification ==
=== Group 1 ===
Teams	Pld	W	D	L	GF	GA	GD	Pts
France	4	2	1	1	7	3	+4	5
Spain	4	2	0	2	7	10	–3	4
Portugal	4	1	1	2	6	7	–1	3

France	3–0	Portugal
Portugal	4–0	Spain
Portugal	0–0	France
Spain	4–2	Portugal
Spain	1–3	France
France	1–2	Spain

=== Group 2 ===
Team 1	Agg.	Team 2	1st leg	2nd leg
Greece	2–2(a)	Turkey	2–1	0–1

=== Group 3 ===
Teams	Pld	W	D	L	GF	GA	GD	Pts
Romania	4	1	3	0	3	2	+1	5
Soviet Union	4	1	2	1	4	2	+2	4
Poland	4	1	1	2	2	5	–3	3

Soviet Union	3–0	Poland
Soviet Union	0–0	Romania
Poland	1–0	Soviet Union
Poland	1–1	Romania
Romania	1–1	Soviet Union
Romania	1–0	Poland

=== Group 4 ===
Teams	Pld	W	D	L	GF	GA	GD	Pts
Wales	4	2	2	0	5	1	+4	6
England	4	2	1	1	15	3	+12	5
Republic of Ireland	4	0	1	3	1	17	–16	1

Republic of Ireland	0–0	Wales
Republic of Ireland	1–4	England
England	10–0	Republic of Ireland
Wales	0–0	England
England	1–2	Wales
Wales	3–0	Republic of Ireland

=== Group 5 ===
Teams	Pld	W	D	L	GF	GA	GD	Pts
West Germany	4	3	0	1	4	2	+2	6
Yugoslavia	4	2	1	1	4	2	+2	5
Czechoslovakia	4	0	1	3	2	6	–4	1

Yugoslavia	2–0	Czechoslovakia
Czechoslovakia	0–1	West Germany
West Germany	1–0	Yugoslavia
Czechoslovakia	1–1	Yugoslavia
Yugoslavia	1–0	West Germany
West Germany	2–1	Czechoslovakia

=== Group 6 ===
Team 1	Agg.	Team 2	1st leg	2nd leg
East Germany	6–1	Austria	4–1	2–0

== Teams ==
The following teams entered the tournament. Six teams qualified (Q) and ten teams entered without playing qualification matches.

- Belgium
- Bulgaria
- East Germany (Q)
- Finland
- France (Q)
- West Germany (Q)
- Hungary
- Italy
- Netherlands
- Norway
- Romania (Q)
- Scotland (host)
- Sweden
- Switzerland
- Turkey (Q)
- Wales (Q)

== Group stage ==
=== Group A ===
Teams	Pld	W	D	L	GF	GA	GD	Pts
Scotland	3	2	1	0	9	3	+6	5
Bulgaria	3	2	1	0	7	3	+4	5
Sweden	3	1	0	2	2	8	–6	2
Italy	3	0	0	3	2	6	–4	0

16 May	Bulgaria	2–2	Scotland
	Sweden	2–0	Italy
18 May	Bulgaria	3–0	Sweden
	Scotland	2–1	Italy
20 May	Bulgaria	2–1	Italy
	Scotland	5–0	Sweden

=== Group B ===
Teams	Pld	W	D	L	GF	GA	GD	Pts
France	3	2	1	0	6	0	+6	5
Hungary	3	2	1	0	5	0	+5	5
Finland	3	1	0	2	2	7	–5	2
Norway	3	0	0	3	0	6	–6	0

16 May	France	3–0	Norway
	Hungary	4–0	Finland
18 May	France	0–0	Hungary
	Finland	2–0	Norway
20 May	France	3–0	Finland
	Hungary	1–0	Norway

=== Group C ===
Teams	Pld	W	D	L	GF	GA	GD	Pts
Netherlands	3	2	1	0	9	3	+6	5
West Germany	3	2	0	1	6	5	+1	4
Switzerland	3	1	0	2	3	8	–5	2
Wales	3	0	1	2	3	5	–2	1

16 May	Netherlands	6–1	Switzerland
	West Germany	3–2	Wales
18 May	Netherlands	1–1	Wales
	West Germany	2–1	Switzerland
20 May	Netherlands	2–1	West Germany
	Switzerland	1–0	Wales

=== Group D ===
Teams	Pld	W	D	L	GF	GA	GD	Pts
East Germany	3	2	1	0	3	0	+3	5
Belgium	3	2	0	1	5	4	+1	4
Romania	3	0	2	1	2	3	–1	2
Turkey	3	0	1	2	0	3	–3	1

16 May	Belgium	3–2	Romania
	East Germany	1–0	Turkey
18 May	East Germany	2–0	Belgium
	Romania	0–0	Turkey
20 May	Belgium	2–0	Turkey
	Romania	0–0	East Germany

== Semifinals ==
23 May 1970

Netherlands	1 – 0	Scotland

Glasgow
23 May 1970

East Germany	(c) 1 – 1	France

Ayr

== Third place match ==
25 May 1970

Scotland	2 – 0	France

Glasgow

== Final ==
25 May 1970

East Germany	(c) 1 – 1 (aet)	Netherlands

Glasgow

1970 UEFA European Under-18 Championship

East Germany
Second title
