= 1973 UEFA European Under-18 Championship =

Tournament details
- Host country: Italy
- Dates: 31 May – 10 June
- Teams: 16

Final positions
- Champions: England (6th title)
- Runners-up: East Germany
- Third place: Italy
- Fourth place: Bulgaria

The UEFA European Under-18 Championship 1973 Final Tournament was held in Italy.

== Qualification ==
=== Groups 1-4 ===
Team 1	Agg.	Team 2	1st leg	2nd leg
Malta	1–5	Austria	1–1	0–4
Luxembourg	2–3	Iceland	2–1	0–2
Republic of Ireland	3–1	Sweden	2–1	1–0
Finland	0–1	Norway	0–0	0–1

=== Group 5 ===
Teams	Pld	W	D	L	GF	GA	GD	Pts
Belgium	4	2	1	1	7	5	+2	5
Portugal	4	2	0	2	5	7	–2	4
Spain	4	1	1	2	7	7	0	3

Portugal	2–1	Spain
Spain	3–1	Portugal
Belgium	2–1	Spain
Belgium	3–1	Portugal
Spain	2–2	Belgium
Portugal	1–0	Belgium

=== Group 6 ===
Teams	Pld	W	D	L	GF	GA	GD	Pts
West Germany	4	2	2	0	5	2	+3	6
Poland	4	2	0	2	6	5	+1	4
Netherlands	4	0	2	2	2	6	–4	2

Netherlands	0–0	West Germany
Netherlands	1–2	Poland
West Germany	1–1	Netherlands
Poland	0–1	West Germany
Poland	3–0	Netherlands
West Germany	3–1	Poland

=== Group 7 ===
Teams	Pld	W	D	L	GF	GA	GD	Pts
Scotland	4	2	1	1	7	5	+2	5
France	4	2	0	2	6	7	–1	4
Wales	4	1	1	2	3	4	–1	3

Wales	1–1	Scotland
Scotland	1–0	Wales
Wales	2–1	France
France	0–3	Scotland
Scotland	2–4	France
France	1–0	Wales

=== Group 8 ===
Teams	Pld	W	D	L	GF	GA	GD	Pts
Romania	4	2	2	0	5	2	+3	6
Greece	4	2	1	1	6	5	+1	5
Yugoslavia	4	0	1	3	2	6	–4	1

Yugoslavia	1–2	Greece
Romania	0–0	Yugoslavia
Greece	2–1	Yugoslavia
Greece	0–1	Romania
Romania	2–2	Greece
Yugoslavia	0–2	Romania

=== Group 9 ===
Teams	Pld	W	D	L	GF	GA	GD	Pts
Soviet Union	4	3	1	0	8	4	+4	7
Hungary	4	1	1	2	4	6	–2	3
Turkey	4	0	2	2	5	7	–2	2

Soviet Union	3–2	Turkey
Turkey	1–1	Hungary
Soviet Union	2–0	Hungary
Turkey	1–1	Soviet Union
Hungary	1–2	Soviet Union
Hungary	2–1	Turkey

== Teams ==
The following teams entered the tournament. Nine teams qualified (Q) and seven teams entered without playing qualification matches.

- Austria (Q)
- Belgium (Q)
- Bulgaria
- Czechoslovakia
- Denmark
- East Germany
- England
- West Germany (Q)
- Iceland (Q)
- Italy (host)
- Norway (Q)
- Romania (Q)
- Republic of Ireland (Q)
- Scotland (Q)
- Soviet Union (Q)
- Switzerland

== Group stage ==
=== Group A ===
Teams	Pld	W	D	L	GF	GA	GD	Pts
Italy	3	3	0	0	5	1	+4	6
Romania	3	2	0	1	4	4	0	4
West Germany	3	1	0	2	2	3	–1	2
Norway	3	0	0	3	2	5	–3	0

31 May	Stadio Gianpiero Vitali, Massa	Italy	3–1	Romania
	Stadio Carlo Necchi-Balloni, Forte dei Marmi	West Germany	2–1	Norway
2 June	Stadio Torquato Bresciani, Viareggio	Italy	1–0	Norway
	Stadio dei Marmi, Carrara	Romania	1–0	West Germany
4 June	Stadio Gianpiero Vitali, Massa	Italy	1–0	West Germany
	Stadio dei Marmi, Carrara	Romania	2–1	Norway

=== Group B ===
Teams	Pld	W	D	L	GF	GA	GD	Pts
Bulgaria	3	2	1	0	6	3	+3	5
Soviet Union	3	2	1	0	3	1	+2	5
Republic of Ireland	3	1	0	2	3	5	–2	2
Denmark	3	0	0	3	4	7	–3	0

31 May	Stadio Marcello Melani, Pistoia	Soviet Union	1–0	Republic of Ireland
	Stadio Roberto Strulli, Monsummano Terme	Bulgaria	3–2	Denmark
2 June	Stadio Daniele Mariotti, Montecatini Terme	Soviet Union	1–0	Denmark
	Stadio Marcello Melani, Pistoia	Bulgaria	2–0	Republic of Ireland
4 June	Stadio Roberto Strulli, Monsummano Terme	Republic of Ireland	3–2	Denmark
	Stadio Porta Elisa, Lucca	Bulgaria	1–1	Soviet Union

=== Group C ===
Teams	Pld	W	D	L	GF	GA	GD	Pts
England	3	2	1	0	4	0	+4	5
Belgium	3	1	2	0	3	1	+2	4
Switzerland	3	1	0	2	2	5	–3	2
Iceland	3	0	1	2	2	5	–3	1

31 May	Stadio Torquato Bresciani, Viareggio	England	2–0	Iceland
	Stadio dei Marmi, Carrara	Belgium	2–0	Switzerland
2 June	Stadio Carlo Necchi-Balloni, Forte dei Marmi	England	2–0	Switzerland
	Stadio Gianpiero Vitali, Massa	Iceland	1–1	Belgium
4 June	Stadio Torquato Bresciani, Viareggio	England	0–0	Belgium
	Stadio Carlo Necchi-Balloni, Forte dei Marmi	Switzerland	2–1	Iceland

=== Group D ===
Teams	Pld	W	D	L	GF	GA	GD	Pts
East Germany	3	2	1	0	7	4	+3	5
Czechoslovakia	3	1	1	1	4	4	0	3
Scotland	3	1	0	2	3	4	–1	2
Austria	3	0	2	1	2	4	–2	2

31 May	Stadio Daniele Mariotti, Montecatini Terme	Austria	1–1	East Germany
	Stadio Porta Elisa, Lucca	Czechoslovakia	1–0	Scotland,
2 June	Stadio Porta Elisa, Lucca	East Germany	3–1	Scotland
	Stadio Roberto Strulli, Monsummano Terme	Austria	1–1	Czechoslovakia
4 June	Stadio Marcello Melani, Pistoia	East Germany	3–2	Czechoslovakia
	Stadio Daniele Mariotti, Montecatini Terme	Scotland	2–0	Austria

== Semifinals ==
7 June 1973

England	1 – 0	Italy

Stadio Torquato Bresciani, Viareggio
7 June 1973

East Germany	1 – 0	Bulgaria

Stadio Daniele Mariotti, Montecatini Terme

== Third place match ==
10 June 1973

Italy	1 – 0	Bulgaria

Stadio Artemio Franchi, Florence

== Final ==
10 June 1973

England	3 – 2 (aet)	East Germany

Stadio Artemio Franchi, Florence

1973 UEFA European Under-18 Championship

England
Sixth title
