= 1981 UEFA European Under-18 Championship =

Tournament details
- Host country: West Germany
- Dates: 25 May – 3 June
- Teams: 16

Final positions
- Champions: West Germany (1st title)
- Runners-up: Poland
- Third place: France
- Fourth place: Spain

The UEFA European Under-18 Championship 1981 Final Tournament was held in West Germany.

== Qualification ==
=== Group 7 ===
Teams	Pld	W	D	L	GF	GA	GD	Pts
Belgium	4	3	1	0	10	2	+8	7
Netherlands	4	2	1	1	12	4	+8	5
Luxembourg	4	0	0	4	2	18	–16	0

Luxembourg	0–6	Netherlands
Luxembourg	0–4	Belgium
Netherlands	1–3	Belgium
Belgium	3–1	Luxembourg
Netherlands	5–1	Luxembourg
Belgium	0–0	Netherlands

=== Other groups ===
Team 1	Agg.	Team 2	1st leg	2nd leg
Wales	4–2	Republic of Ireland	2–2	2–0
Iceland	1–4	Scotland	0–1	1–3
England	4–0	Northern Ireland	1–0	3–0
Finland	1–2	Sweden	1–1	0–1
Poland	4–1	East Germany	2–0	2–1
Denmark	3–2	Norway	0–1	3–1
Portugal	0–3	France	0–1	0–2
Malta	1–8	Italy	1–5	0–3
Spain	5–2	Switzerland	4–1	1–1
Hungary	0–1	Romania	0–0	0–1
Austria	4–2	Turkey	4–0	0–2
Soviet Union	1–1 (3–4p)	Czechoslovakia	1–0	0–1
Yugoslavia	0–1	Bulgaria	0–0	0–1
Greece	4–1	Cyprus	1–0	3–1

== Teams ==
The following teams qualified for the tournament:

- Austria
- Belgium
- Bulgaria
- Czechoslovakia
- Denmark
- England
- France
- West Germany (host)
- Greece
- Italy
- Poland
- Romania
- Scotland
- Spain
- Sweden
- Wales

== Group stage ==
=== Group A ===
Teams	Pld	W	D	L	GF	GA	GD	Pts
West Germany	3	3	0	0	9	2	+7	6
Wales	3	2	0	1	4	5	–1	4
Belgium	3	1	0	2	4	6	–2	2
Greece	3	0	0	3	0	4	–4	0

25 May	West Germany	5–0	Wales
	Belgium	2–0	Greece
27 May	West Germany	3–2	Belgium
	Greece	0–1	Wales
29 May	West Germany	1–0	Greece
	Belgium	0–3	Wales

=== Group B ===
Teams	Pld	W	D	L	GF	GA	GD	Pts
Poland	3	2	1	0	7	3	+4	5
Sweden	3	0	3	0	3	3	0	3
Romania	3	1	1	1	5	6	–1	3
Czechoslovakia	3	0	1	2	4	7	–3	1

25 May	Poland	1–1	Sweden
	Romania	3–2	Czechoslovakia
27 May	Poland	3–1	Romania
	Sweden	1–1	Czechoslovakia
29 May	Poland	3–1	Czechoslovakia
	Sweden	1–1	Romania

=== Group C ===
Teams	Pld	W	D	L	GF	GA	GD	Pts
France	3	2	1	0	5	1	+4	5
Denmark	3	1	1	1	5	5	0	3
Italy	3	1	1	1	2	2	0	3
Bulgaria	3	0	1	2	2	6	–4	1

25 May	Italy	0–0	France
	Bulgaria	2–2	Denmark
27 May	Italy	1–0	Bulgaria
	France	2–1	Denmark
29 May	Italy	1–2	Denmark
	France	3–0	Bulgaria

=== Group D ===
Teams	Pld	W	D	L	GF	GA	GD	Pts
Spain	3	2	1	0	6	2	+4	5
Scotland	3	2	1	0	3	1	+2	5
England	3	1	0	2	8	3	+5	2
Austria	3	0	0	3	0	11	–11	0

25 May	Austria	0–1	Scotland
	Spain	2–1	England
27 May	Austria	0–3	Spain
	Scotland	1–0	England
29 May	Austria	0–7	England
	Scotland	1–1	Spain

== Semifinals ==
1 June 1981

West Germany	1 – 1	France
Penalties
	4 – 3

Cologne
1 June 1981

Poland	0 – 0	Spain
Penalties
	6 – 5

Bochum

== Third place match ==
2 June 1981

France	1 – 1	Spain
Penalties
	2 – 0

Duisburg
Referee: Josef Poucek (Czechoslovakia)

== Final ==
3 June 1981

West Germany	1 – 0	Poland
Holger Anthes 54'

Rheinstadion, Düsseldorf
Attendance: 56.000
Referee: Adolf Mathias (Austria)

1981 UEFA European Under-18 Championship

West Germany
First title
