= 1963 UEFA European Under-18 Championship =

Tournament details
- Host country: England
- Dates: 13–23 April
- Teams: 16

Final positions
- Champions: England (2nd title)
- Runners-up: Northern Ireland
- Third place: Scotland
- Fourth place: Bulgaria

The UEFA European Under-18 Championship 1963 Final Tournament was held in England. It was considered to be the 16th International Youth Football Tournament.

It was hosted by England as part of the Football Association's centenary celebration.

== Qualification ==
Team 1	Score	Team 2
Sweden	2–0	Finland
Netherlands	11–2	Wales

Team 1	Agg.	Team 2	1st leg	2nd leg
Poland	2–3	Hungary	1–1	1–2
Portugal	5–5 (a)	France	4–2	1–3
Austria	3–4	West Germany	1–2	2–2
Yugoslavia	1–2	Bulgaria	1–1	0–1
Republic of Ireland	3–4	Northern Ireland	1–1	2–3
Greece	3–2	Turkey	2–1	1–1
Spain	4–5	Italy	2–2	2–3
Luxembourg	1–10	Belgium	0–2	1–8

A match between East Germany and Czechoslovakia (3-0) may have been related to the qualifying stage as well.

== Teams ==
The following teams qualified for the tournament:

- Belgium
- Bulgaria
- Czechoslovakia (received Bye for qualifying stage)
- England (qualified as host)
- France
- West Germany
- Greece
- Hungary
- Italy
- Netherlands
- Northern Ireland
- Romania (qualified as cup holders)
- Scotland (received Bye for qualifying stage)
- Soviet Union (received Bye for qualifying stage)
- Sweden
- Switzerland (received Bye for qualifying stage)

East Germany also received a Bye for the qualifying stage but withdrew before the start of the tournament. After this, a Bye was given to both Czechoslovakia and the Soviet Union who were drawn against each other for the qualifying stage.

== Group stage ==
=== Group A ===
Teams	Pld	W	D	L	GF	GA	GD	Pts
Scotland	3	2	0	1	8	3	+5	4
West Germany	3	2	0	1	6	9	–3	4
Greece	3	1	1	1	8	7	+1	3
Switzerland	3	0	1	2	3	6	–3	1

13 April	Greece	7–2	West Germany
	Scotland	3–1	Switzerland
15 April	West Germany	2–1	Scotland
	Switzerland	1–1	Greece
17 April	Scotland	4–0	Greece
	West Germany	2–1	Switzerland

=== Group B ===
Teams	Pld	W	D	L	GF	GA	GD	Pts
Bulgaria	3	2	1	0	5	2	+3	5
Italy	3	2	0	1	8	3	+5	4
France	3	1	0	2	4	7	–3	2
Hungary	3	0	1	2	2	7	–5	1

13 April	Bulgaria	2–0	France
	Italy	3–0	Hungary
15 April	Hungary	1–1	Bulgaria
	Italy	4–1	France
17 April	Bulgaria	2–1	Italy
	France	3–1	Hungary

=== Group C ===
Teams	Pld	W	D	L	GF	GA	GD	Pts
England	3	3	0	0	10	0	+10	6
Romania	3	2	0	1	3	3	0	4
Netherlands	3	1	0	2	3	8	–5	2
Soviet Union	3	0	0	3	1	6	–5	0

13 April	England	5–0	Netherlands
	Romania	1–0	Soviet Union
15 April	Netherlands	3–1	Soviet Union
	England	3–0	Romania
17 April	England	2–0	Soviet Union
	Romania	2–0	Netherlands

=== Group D ===
Teams	Pld	W	D	L	GF	GA	GD	Pts
Northern Ireland	3	2	1	0	6	4	+2	5
Belgium	3	2	0	1	5	3	+2	4
Czechoslovakia	3	1	0	2	4	5	–1	2
Sweden	3	0	1	2	6	9	–3	1

13 April	Czechoslovakia	4–2	Sweden
	Northern Ireland	2–1	Belgium
15 April	Belgium	2–1	Sweden
	Northern Ireland	1–0	Czechoslovakia
17 April	Northern Ireland	3–3	Sweden
	Belgium	2–0	Czechoslovakia

== Semifinals ==
18 April 1963

England	1 – 0	Scotland

London
18 April 1963

Northern Ireland	(c) 3 – 3	Bulgaria

Southampton

== Third place match ==
22 April 1963

Scotland	4 – 2	Bulgaria

Portsmouth

== Final ==
23 April 1963

England	4 – 0	Northern Ireland
Napier 5' (o.g.); Sammels 48'; Sissons 59'; Whittaker 67'

London
Attendance: 34,582
Referee: (West Germany) Kreitlein

1963 UEFA European Under-18 Championship

England
Second title
