= 1969 UEFA European Under-18 Championship =

Tournament details
- Host country: East Germany
- Dates: 18–26 May
- Teams: 16

Final positions
- Champions: Bulgaria (2nd title)
- Runners-up: East Germany
- Third place: Soviet Union
- Fourth place: Scotland

The UEFA European Under-18 Championship 1969 Final Tournament was held in East Germany.

== Qualification ==
=== Single Match ===
Team 1	Score	Team 2
Scotland	8–1	Norway

=== Two-legged Matches ===
Team 1	Agg.	Team 2	1st leg	2nd leg
Soviet Union	8–1	Finland	3–1	5–0
Portugal	(c) 2–2	Italy	1–1	1–1
England	3–0	Belgium	1–0	2–0
Bulgaria	DSQ	Albania		
Sweden	2–4	West Germany	1–2	1–2
Hungary	3–3 (a)	Yugoslavia	3–1	0–2

=== Group ===
Teams	Pld	W	D	L	GF	GA	GD	Pts
France	4	4	0	0	13	1	+12	8
Netherlands	4	1	0	3	7	7	0	2
Switzerland	4	1	0	3	2	14	–12	2

24 November (1968)	Switzerland	1–0	Netherlands
7 December (1968)	France	6–0	Switzerland
26 February	Netherlands	0–2	France
8 March	France	3–1	Netherlands
23 March	Switzerland	0–2	France
5 April	Netherlands	6–1	Switzerland

== Teams ==
The following teams entered the tournament. Eight teams qualified (Q) and eight teams entered without playing qualification matches.

- Austria
- Bulgaria (Q)
- Czechoslovakia
- East Germany (host)
- England (Q)
- France (Q)
- West Germany (Q)
- Malta
- Poland
- Portugal (Q)
- Romania
- Scotland (Q)
- Soviet Union (Q)
- Spain
- Turkey
- Yugoslavia (Q)

== Group stage ==
=== Group A ===
Teams	Pld	W	D	L	GF	GA	GD	Pts
Soviet Union	3	3	0	0	6	1	+5	6
Romania	3	2	0	1	4	2	+2	4
Portugal	3	1	0	2	2	4	–2	2
Turkey	3	0	0	3	1	6	–5	0

18 May	Romania	2–1	Turkey
	Soviet Union	2–1	Portugal
20 May	Soviet Union	3–0	Turkey
	Romania	2–0	Portugal
22 May	Portugal	1–0	Turkey
	Soviet Union	1–0	Romania

=== Group B ===
Teams	Pld	W	D	L	GF	GA	GD	Pts
East Germany	3	3	0	0	15	0	+15	6
England	3	2	0	1	9	5	+4	4
Czechoslovakia	3	1	0	2	8	4	+4	2
Malta	3	0	0	3	0	23	–23	0

18 May	England	6–0	Malta
	East Germany	1–0	Czechoslovakia
20 May	England	3–1	Czechoslovakia
	East Germany	10–0	Malta
22 May	East Germany	4–0	England
	Czechoslovakia	7–0	Malta

=== Group C ===
Teams	Pld	W	D	L	GF	GA	GD	Pts
Bulgaria	3	3	0	0	7	2	+5	6
West Germany	3	1	0	2	2	3	–1	2
Spain	3	1	0	2	3	5	–2	2
France	3	1	0	2	2	4	–2	2

18 May	Bulgaria	1–0	West Germany
	Spain	1–0	France
20 May	France	1–0	West Germany
	Bulgaria	3–1	Spain
22 May	West Germany	2–1	Spain
	Bulgaria	3–1	France

=== Group D ===
Teams	Pld	W	D	L	GF	GA	GD	Pts
Scotland	3	2	1	0	4	2	+2	5
Yugoslavia	3	1	2	0	3	1	+2	4
Austria	3	1	0	2	4	4	0	2
Poland	3	0	1	2	0	4	–4	1

18 May	Yugoslavia	2–0	Austria
	Scotland	1–0	Poland
20 May	Scotland	2–1	Austria
	Yugoslavia	0–0	Poland
22 May	Austria	3–0	Poland
	Yugoslavia	1–1	Scotland

== Semifinals ==
24 May 1969

Bulgaria	3 – 0	Soviet Union

Dresden
24 May 1969

East Germany	2 – 1	Scotland

Karl-Marx-Stadt

== Third place match ==
26 May 1969

Soviet Union	1 – 0	Scotland

Halle

== Final ==
26 May 1969

Bulgaria	(c) 1 – 1 (aet)	East Germany

Leipzig

1969 UEFA European Under-18 Championship

Bulgaria
Second title
