= 1966 UEFA European Under-18 Championship =

Tournament details
- Host country: Yugoslavia
- Dates: 21–29 May
- Teams: 16

Final positions
- Champions: Soviet Union (1st title); Italy (2nd title)
- Third place: Yugoslavia
- Fourth place: Spain

The UEFA European Under-18 Championship 1966 Final Tournament was held in Yugoslavia. The Soviet Union and Italy drew their final match and shared the title.

== Qualification ==
Team 1	Agg.	Team 2	1st leg	2nd leg
Hungary	2–0	Austria	1–0	1–0
Netherlands	5–3	Belgium	4–2	1–1
Soviet Union	(c) 1–1	Romania	1–0	0–1
Czechoslovakia	2–1	Poland	1–0	1–1

== Teams ==
The following teams entered the tournament. Four teams qualified for the tournament (Q) and the other teams entered without playing qualification matches.

- Bulgaria
- Czechoslovakia (Q)
- East Germany
- England
- France
- West Germany
- Hungary (Q)
- Italy
- Netherlands (Q)
- Portugal
- Scotland
- Soviet Union (Q)
- Spain
- Switzerland
- Turkey
- Yugoslavia (host)

== Group stage ==
=== Group A ===
Teams	Pld	W	D	L	GF	GA	GD	Pts
Spain	3	2	1	0	6	3	+3	5
Scotland	3	1	2	0	4	3	+1	4
West Germany	3	1	0	2	3	5	–2	2
Netherlands	3	0	1	2	4	6	–2	1

21 May	Spain	1–1	Scotland
	Netherlands	1–2	West Germany
23 May	Spain	2–1	Netherlands
	Scotland	1–0	West Germany
25 May	Spain	3–1	West Germany
	Scotland	2–2	Netherlands

=== Group B ===
Teams	Pld	W	D	L	GF	GA	GD	Pts
Yugoslavia	3	3	0	0	6	2	+4	6
Bulgaria	3	1	1	1	3	3	0	3
Portugal	3	1	0	2	3	4	–1	2
East Germany	3	0	1	2	2	5	–3	1

21 May	East Germany	1–1	Bulgaria
	Yugoslavia	2–1	Portugal
23 May	Bulgaria	2–0	Portugal
	Yugoslavia	2–1	East Germany
25 May	Portugal	2–0	East Germany
	Yugoslavia	2–0	Bulgaria

=== Group C ===
Teams	Pld	W	D	L	GF	GA	GD	Pts
Italy	3	1	2	0	5	3	+2	4
Czechoslovakia	3	2	0	1	7	6	+1	4
France	3	1	1	1	4	5	–1	3
England	3	0	1	2	4	6	–2	1

21 May	Czechoslovakia	3–2	England
	France	1–1	Italy
23 May	France	2–1	England
	Italy	3–1	Czechoslovakia
25 May	Czechoslovakia	3–1	France
	Italy	1–1	England

=== Group D ===
Teams	Pld	W	D	L	GF	GA	GD	Pts
Soviet Union	3	2	1	0	6	2	+4	5
Hungary	3	1	2	0	5	3	+2	4
Turkey	3	0	2	1	3	5	–2	2
Switzerland	3	0	1	2	2	6	–4	1

21 May	Hungary	3–1	Switzerland
	Soviet Union	3–1	Turkey
23 May	Hungary	2–2	Turkey
	Soviet Union	3–1	Switzerland
25 May	Hungary	0–0	Soviet Union
	Turkey	0–0	Switzerland

== Semifinals ==
27 May 1966

Soviet Union	1 – 0	Yugoslavia
Vyacheslav Bektashev 29'	Report

JNA Stadium, Beograd
Referee: (Germany) Helmut Fritz
27 May 1966

Italy	1 – 0	Spain
Petrini 57'	Report

JNA Stadium, Beograd

== Third place match ==
29 May 1966

Yugoslavia	2 – 0	Spain
Dakić 60'; Popivoda 79'

JNA Stadium, Beograd
Attendance: 2,000
Referee: (England) Crawford

== Final ==
29 May 1966

Soviet Union	0 – 0 Title Shared	Italy

JNA Stadium, Beograd
Attendance: 2,500
Referee: (France) Robert Lacoste

1966 UEFA European Under-18 Championship

Italy
Second title

1966 UEFA European Under-18 Championship

Soviet Union
First title
