= 1965 UEFA European Under-18 Championship =

Tournament details
- Host country: West Germany
- Dates: 15–25 April
- Teams: 23

Final positions
- Champions: East Germany (1st title)
- Runners-up: England
- Third place: Czechoslovakia
- Fourth place: Italy

The UEFA European Under-18 Championship 1965 Final Tournament was held in West Germany.

== Teams ==
The following teams entered the tournament:

- Austria
- Belgium
- Bulgaria
- Czechoslovakia
- East Germany
- England
- France
- West Germany (host)
- Greece
- Hungary
- Italy
- Luxembourg
- Netherlands
- Poland
- Portugal
- Republic of Ireland
- Romania
- Scotland
- Spain
- Sweden
- Switzerland
- Turkey
- Yugoslavia

== Group stage ==
=== Group A ===
Teams	Pld	W	D	L	GF	GA	GD	Pts
Italy	2	1	1	0	3	1	+2	3
Scotland	2	1	1	0	2	1	+1	3
Yugoslavia	2	0	0	2	0	3	–3	0

15 April	Italy	1–1	Scotland
17 April	Scotland	1–0	Yugoslavia
19 April	Italy	2–0	Yugoslavia

=== Group B ===
Teams	Pld	W	D	L	GF	GA	GD	Pts
Republic of Ireland	2	1	1	0	3	1	+2	4
Poland	2	0	2	0	0	0	0	2
Switzerland	2	0	1	1	1	3	–2	1

15 April	Switzerland	0–0	Poland
17 April	Poland	0–0	Republic of Ireland
19 April	Switzerland	1–3	Republic of Ireland

=== Group C ===
Teams	Pld	W	D	L	GF	GA	GD	Pts
West Germany	2	2	0	0	15	1	+14	4
Greece	2	1	0	1	3	5	–2	2
Luxembourg	2	0	0	2	1	13	–12	0

15 April	Greece	2–1	Luxembourg
17 April	West Germany	11–0	Luxembourg
19 April	West Germany	4–1	Greece

=== Group D ===
Teams	Pld	W	D	L	GF	GA	GD	Pts
Czechoslovakia	2	2	0	0	7	1	+6	4
Bulgaria	2	0	1	1	2	3	–1	1
France	2	0	1	1	1	6	–5	1

15 April	Czechoslovakia	2–1	Bulgaria
17 April	Bulgaria	1–1	France
19 April	Czechoslovakia	5–0	France

=== Group E ===
Teams	Pld	W	D	L	GF	GA	GD	Pts
Hungary	2	1	1	0	4	0	+4	3
Romania	2	0	2	0	3	3	0	2
Sweden	2	0	1	1	3	7	–4	1

15 April	Hungary	0–0	Romania
17 April	Hungary	4–0	Sweden
19 April	Romania	3–3	Sweden

=== Group F ===
Teams	Pld	W	D	L	GF	GA	GD	Pts
England	2	1	1	0	3	0	+3	3
Belgium	2	1	0	1	3	5	–2	2
Spain	2	0	1	1	2	3	–1	1

15 April	England	3–0	Belgium
17 April	England	0–0	Spain
19 April	Belgium	3–2	Spain

=== Group G ===
Teams	Pld	W	D	L	GF	GA	GD	Pts
East Germany	2	2	0	0	9	1	+8	4
Portugal	2	0	1	1	3	4	–1	1
Austria	2	0	1	1	2	9	–7	1

15 April	East Germany	2–1	Portugal
17 April	Portugal	2–2	Austria
19 April	East Germany	7–0	Austria

=== Group H ===
Teams	Pld	W	D	L	GF	GA	GD	Pts
Netherlands	2	2	0	0	7	4	+3	4
Turkey	2	0	0	2	4	7	–3	0

15 April	Netherlands	3–2	Turkey
19 April	Turkey	2–4	Netherlands

== Quarterfinals ==
21 April 1965

Italy	2 – 0	Republic of Ireland

Bochum
21 April 1965

Czechoslovakia	(c) 0 – 0	West Germany

Hagen
21 April 1965

England	5 – 0	Hungary

Wuppertal
21 April 1965

East Germany	3 – 0	Netherlands

Rheydt

== Semifinals ==
=== Places 5-8 ===
23 April 1965

West Germany	2 – 1	Netherlands

West Berlin
23 April 1965

Hungary	3 – 0	Republic of Ireland

Emmerich

=== Places 1-4 ===
23 April 1965

England	3 – 1	Italy

Marl
23 April 1965

East Germany	3 – 1	Czechoslovakia

Oberhausen

== Final Matches ==
=== Seventh-place match ===
25 April 1965

Republic of Ireland	2 – 1	Netherlands

Duisburg

=== Fifth-place match ===
25 April 1965

West Germany	2 – 1	Hungary

Gelsenkirchen

=== Third-place match ===
25 April 1965

Czechoslovakia	4 – 1	Italy

Düsseldorf

== Final ==
25 April 1965

East Germany	3 – 2	England
47', 59' Sparwasser; 70' Kreische		64' Bond; 67' Osgood

Essen
Attendance: 18.000
Referee: (Czechoslovakia) Malka

1965 UEFA European Under-18 Championship

East Germany
First title
