= Scotland national under-18 football team =

National U-18 association football team

Scotland Under-18
- Association: Scottish Football Association
- Head coach: Billy Stark
First colours	Second colours

First international
- –

UEFA European Under-18 Championship
- Appearances: 18 (first in 1949)
- Best result: Winners (1982)
Medal record
UEFA European U-18 Championship
Gold medal – first place	1982 Finland
Bronze medal – third place	1963 England
Bronze medal – third place	1970 Scotland
Bronze medal – third place	1974 Sweden

The Scotland national under-18 football team is the national football team representing Scotland for players of 18 years of age or under at the start of a denoted campaign. The team, which is controlled by the Scottish Football Association, acts as a feeder team to the Scotland national football team.

== History ==
Scotland's best performance at a European Championship Finals occurred in 1982, when they won the tournament. The team was then managed by Andy Roxburgh and Walter Smith, who would both go on to manage the senior side. Scotland defeated rivals England in the qualifying round and finished top of Group 4, which also included the Netherlands. Scotland beat Poland 2–0 in the semi-finals and Czechoslovakia 3–1 in the final.

Scotland reached the semi-finals on seven other occasions. Scotland hosted the 1970 tournament, where they won a group containing Bulgaria, Sweden and Italy, but then lost 1–0 to Netherlands in the semi-final. In the 1978 tournament, hosted by Poland, Scotland topped a group containing Germany and Italy to qualify for the semi-final, where they lost on penalties to Yugoslavia.

The age group of the competition was adjusted upwards by one year for the 2002 tournament, with Scotland entering an under-19 team from then on. The Scotland under-18 team consequently fell into abeyance, aside from sporadic friendly matches including double-headers against Serbia in April 2012, Israel in April 2013 and the Czech Republic in October 2014.

In 2018, recognising a gap in progression for the best players of the relevant age (several of whom were Performance School participants fast-tracked into the under-17s but not ready for the step up to under-19s), the SFA announced that the under-18 team would be re-established to offer more match experience as part of the same group.

=== Coaches ===
- 2018: Billy Stark

== Competitive record ==
Champions Runners-up Third place / semi finals Fourth place Tournament held on home soil

=== UEFA European U-18 Championship Record ===
- 1948–1954 – FIFA Youth Tournament
- 1955–1980 – UEFA Youth Tournament
- 1981–2001 – UEFA European U-18 Championship

Year	Round	GP	W	D	L	GS	GA
(England) 1948	did not enter						
(Netherlands) 1949	6th place	2	0	0	2	2	4
(Austria) 1950	did not enter						
(France) 1951	did not enter						
(Spain) 1952	did not enter						
(Belgium) 1953	did not enter						
(West Germany) 1954	did not enter						
(Italy) 1955	did not enter						
(Hungary) 1956	did not enter						
(Spain) 1957	did not enter						
(Luxembourg) 1958	did not enter						
(Bulgaria) 1959	did not enter						
(Austria) 1960	did not enter						
(Portugal) 1961	did not enter						
(Romania) 1962	did not enter						
(England) 1963	Third place	5	3	0	2	12	6
(Netherlands) 1964	Fourth place	5	3	0	2	10	7
(West Germany) 1965	Group stage	2	1	1	0	2	1
(Socialist Federal Republic of Yugoslavia) 1966	Group stage	3	1	2	0	4	3
(Turkey) 1967	Qualification round	–	–	–	–	–	–
(France) 1968	Group stage	3	2	0	1	6	2
(East Germany) 1969	Fourth place	5	2	1	2	5	5
(Scotland) 1970	Third place	5	3	1	1	11	4
(Czechoslovakia) 1971	Qualification round	–	–	–	–	–	–
(Spain) 1972	Group stage	3	2	0	1	6	4
(Italy) 1973	Group stage	3	1	0	2	3	4
(Sweden) 1974	Third place	5	3	1	1	11	4
(Switzerland) 1975	Qualification round	–	–	–	–	–	–
(Hungary) 1976	Withdrew						
(Belgium) 1977	Withdrew						
(Poland) 1978	Fourth place	5	2	2	1	5	5
(Austria) 1979	Group stage	3	2	0	1	5	5
(East Germany) 1980	Qualification round	–	–	–	–	–	–
(West Germany) 1981	Group stage	3	2	1	0	3	1
(Finland) 1982	Champions	5	4	1	0	11	2
(England) 1983	Group stage	3	1	1	1	4	4
(Soviet Union) 1984	Group stage	3	1	1	1	4	5
(Socialist Federal Republic of Yugoslavia) 1986	Fourth place	3	1	0	2	1	2
(Czechoslovakia) 1988	Qualification round	–	–	–	–	–	–
(Hungary) 1990	Qualification round	–	–	–	–	–	–
(Germany) 1992	Qualification round	–	–	–	–	–	–
(England) 1993	Qualification round	–	–	–	–	–	–
(Spain) 1994	Qualification round	–	–	–	–	–	–
(Greece) 1995	Qualification round	–	–	–	–	–	–
(France) 1996	Qualification round	–	–	–	–	–	–
(Iceland) 1997	Qualification round	–	–	–	–	–	–
(Cyprus) 1998	Qualification round	–	–	–	–	–	–
(Sweden) 1999	Qualification round	–	–	–	–	–	–
(Germany) 2000	Qualification round	–	–	–	–	–	–
(Finland) 2001	Qualification round	–	–	–	–	–	–
Since 2002	See Scotland national under-19 football team						
Total	18/50	66	34	12	20	104	68

Notes

- First qualifying round and Preliminary round are the same stage
- Elite round, Intermediary round and Second qualifying round are the same stage
- Draws also include penalty shootouts, regardless of the outcome.

=== Other tournaments ===
Year	Competition	Result	GP	W	D*	L	GS	GA	Ref
(Spain) 1973	Atlantic Cup	3rd	2	1	1	0	2	1	
(Spain) 1974	Atlantic Cup	3rd	3	0	3	0	2	2	
(France) 1976	Cannes Tournament	1st	4	3	1	0	8	2	
(France) 1977	Cannes Tournament	3rd	4	2	1	1	6	5	
(France) 1979	Monaco Tournament	3rd	4	3	1	0	4	0	
(Spain) 1979	Atlantic Cup	1st	3	2	1	0	11	1	
(France) 1980	Monaco Tournament	5th	3	1	1	1	3	2	
(France) 1981	Cannes Tournament	5th	4	2	1	1	4	4	
(France) 1982	Monaco Tournament	5th	2	0	0	2	0	4	
(Netherlands) 1984	Four Nations Tournament	4th	3	0	1	2	1	4	
(France) 1985	Cannes Tournament	6th	4	1	2	1	3	4	
(Italy) 1985	Four Nations Tournament	1st	3	2	1	0	5	2	
(Belgium) 1986	Four Nations Tournament	4th	3	0	1	2	1	5	
(Scotland) 1987	Four Nations Tournament	3rd	3	1	1	1	3	3	
(Italy) 1988	Four Nations Tournament	4th	3	0	0	3	2	7	
(Netherlands) 1989	Four Nations Tournament	2nd	3	1	1	1	1	2	
(Belgium) 1990	Four Nations Tournament	4th	3	0	1	2	5	8	
(Scotland) 1991	Four Nations Tournament	3rd	3	0	2	1	0	1	
(Italy) 1992	Four Nations Tournament	3rd	3	1	0	2	6	4	
(Netherlands) 1993	Four Nations Tournament	2nd	3	1	2	0	5	3	
(Belgium) 1994	Four Nations Tournament	1st	3	2	1	0	4	1	
(Scotland) 1995	Four Nations Tournament	3rd	3	1	0	2	5	6	
(Denmark) 1996	Four Nations Tournament	1st	3	2	0	1	8	3	
(Netherlands) 1997	Four Nations Tournament	1st	3	2	1	0	4	2	
(Belgium) 1998	Four Nations Tournament	2nd	3	2	0	1	4	2	
(Scotland) 1999	Four Nations Tournament	1st	2	2	0	0	5	1	
(Denmark) 2000	Four Nations Tournament	1st	2	1	1	0	3	1	
(Belgium) 2001	Four Nations Tournament	3rd	3	1	1	1	1	1	
(Denmark) 2003	Four Nations Tournament	3rd	3	1	0	2	6	8	
(Slovenia) 2004	Slovakia Cup	4th	4	1	1	2	3	7	
(Scotland) 2004	Four Nations Tournament	2nd	2	0	2	0	0	0	
(France) 2007	Limoges Tournament	3rd	3	0	1	2	3	6	

== Current squad ==
The following players were selected for two friendlies against Wales in March 2023.

No.	Pos.	Player	Date of birth (age)	Caps	Goals	Club
		Cameron Bruce				(Scottish Football Association) Queen's Park
		Cameron Cooper				(Scottish Football Association) Rangers
		Jack Dallimore	28 November 2001 (age 24)			(The Football Association) Bolton Wanderers
		Julian Donnery				(The Football Association) Barwell
		Johnny Emerson				(The Football Association) Newcastle United
		Louis Jackson				(The Football Association) Manchester United
		Daniel Kelly				(Scottish Football Association) Celtic
		Jack Kingdon				(The Football Association) Manchester United
		Ethan Laidlaw				(Scottish Football Association) Hibernian
		Dylan Lobban				(Scottish Football Association) Aberdeen
		Benny Jackson Luyeye				(Scottish Football Association) Celtic
		Magnus Mackenzie				(Scottish Football Association) Celtic
		Noah McCann				(The Football Association) Queen's Park Rangers
		Chris McGinn				(Scottish Football Association) Hamilton Academical
		George Morrison	24 October 2005 (age 21)			(The Football Association) Fleetwood Town
		Dylan Reid	1 March 2005 (age 21)			(The Football Association) Crystal Palace
		Mitchell Robertson	16 October 2001 (age 25)			(Scottish Football Association) Celtic
		Joshua Squires				(The Football Association) Southampton
		Corey Thomson				(Scottish Football Association) Celtic
		Bobby Wales				(Scottish Football Association) Kilmarnock
		Woody Williamson				(The Football Association) Ipswich Town
		Max Woodcock				(The Football Association) Crewe Alexandra
