= 1972 UEFA European Under-18 Championship =

Tournament details
- Host country: Spain
- Dates: 13–22 May
- Teams: 16

Final positions
- Champions: England (5th title)
- Runners-up: West Germany
- Third place: Poland
- Fourth place: Spain

The UEFA European Under-18 Championship 1972 Final Tournament was a youth football tournament held in Spain.

== Qualification ==
=== Round 1 ===
For this round Belgium, East Germany, Wales and Soviet Union received a Bye.

Team 1	Agg.	Team 2	1st leg	2nd leg
Switzerland	2–1	Portugal	2–0	0–1
Finland	3–3(a)	Poland	2–2	1–1
Iceland	6–8	Republic of Ireland	4–3	2–5
Bulgaria	4–0	Greece	3–0	1–0
Luxembourg	0–4	Denmark	0–3	0–1
Sweden	3–7	West Germany	1–1	2–6
Yugoslavia	5–1	Turkey	4–0	1–1
Austria	1–2	Czechoslovakia	1–0	0–2

=== Round 2 ===
Team 1	Agg.	Team 2	1st leg	2nd leg
Belgium	(a)3–3	Switzerland	1–0	2–3
East Germany	2–2(p)	Poland	2–0	0–2
Wales	w.o.	Republic of Ireland	2–1	w.o.
Soviet Union	1–0	Bulgaria	1–0	0–0
Denmark	2–9	West Germany	0–4	2–5
Czechoslovakia	1–1(p)	Yugoslavia	0–1	1–0

== Teams ==
The following teams entered the tournament. Six teams qualified (Q) and ten teams entered without playing qualification matches.

- Belgium (Q)
- England
- France
- West Germany (Q)
- Hungary
- Italy
- Malta
- Netherlands
- Norway
- Poland (Q)
- Republic of Ireland (Q)
- Romania
- Scotland
- Soviet Union (Q)
- Spain (host)
- Yugoslavia (Q)

== Group stage ==
=== Group A ===
Teams	Pld	W	D	L	GF	GA	GD	Pts
Poland	3	2	1	0	6	1	+5	5
France	3	2	0	1	6	4	+2	4
Netherlands	3	1	1	1	2	3	–1	3
Norway	3	0	0	3	1	7	–6	0

13 May	Netherlands	1–0	Norway
	Poland	2–1	France
15 May	France	2–1	Norway
	Netherlands	0–0	Poland
17 May	Poland	4–0	Norway
	France	3–1	Netherlands

=== Group B ===
Teams	Pld	W	D	L	GF	GA	GD	Pts
West Germany	3	2	0	1	7	3	+4	4
Scotland	3	2	0	1	6	4	+2	4
Hungary	3	2	0	1	8	7	+1	4
Soviet Union	3	0	0	3	1	8	–7	0

13 May	Hungary	4–3	Scotland
	West Germany	4–0	Soviet Union
15 May	Scotland	1–0	West Germany
	Hungary	2–1	Soviet Union
17 May	Scotland	2–0	Soviet Union
	West Germany	3–2	Hungary

=== Group C ===
Teams	Pld	W	D	L	GF	GA	GD	Pts
England	3	2	1	0	5	0	+5	5
Belgium	3	1	1	1	3	2	+1	3
Yugoslavia	3	1	1	1	3	3	0	3
Republic of Ireland	3	0	1	2	1	7	–6	1

13 May	Yugoslavia	1–1	Republic of Ireland
	Belgium	0–0	England
15 May	Yugoslavia	2–1	Belgium
	England	4–0	Republic of Ireland
17 May	England	1–0	Yugoslavia
	Belgium	2–0	Republic of Ireland

=== Group D ===
Teams	Pld	W	D	L	GF	GA	GD	Pts
Spain	3	2	1	0	9	2	+7	5
Italy	3	1	2	0	7	3	+4	4
Romania	3	1	1	1	5	3	+2	3
Malta	3	0	0	3	1	14	–13	0

13 May	Italy	5–1	Malta
	Spain	2–1	Romania
15 May	Spain	1–1	Italy
	Romania	3–0	Malta
17 May	Spain	6–0	Malta
	Romania	1–1	Italy

== Semifinals ==
20 May 1972

England	1 – 0	Poland

Valencia
20 May 1972

West Germany	2 – 2	Spain
Penalties
	5 – 4

Barcelona

== Third place match ==
22 May 1972

Poland	0 – 0	Spain
Penalties
	6 – 5

Barcelona

== Final ==
22 May 1972

England	2 – 0	West Germany

Barcelona

ENGLAND: (England) Graham Moseley (England) John Gidman (England) Alan Lewis (England) Mick Buckley (England) Kevin Lock (England) Kevin Beattie (England) Paul Bradshaw (England) Trevor Francis (England) Steve Cammack (England) Phil Thompson (England) Alan Green	WEST GERMANY: (West Germany) Helmut Roleder (West Germany) Rainer Blechschmidt (West Germany) Peter Krobbach (West Germany) Charly Körbel (West Germany) Georg Bosbach (West Germany) Wolfgang Kraus (West Germany) Ronnie Worm (West Germany) Kurt Eigl (West Germany) Günter Selke (West Germany) Werner Schneider (West Germany) Dieter Kaster (West Germany) Bernd Dürnberger

1972 UEFA European Under-18 Championship

England
Fifth title
