= 1958 UEFA European Under-18 Championship =

Tournament details
- Host countries: Luxembourg; West Germany; Belgium; France
- Dates: 3–13 April
- Teams: 18

Final positions
- Champions: Italy (1st title)
- Runners-up: England
- Third place: France
- Fourth place: Romania

The UEFA European Under-18 Championship 1958 Final Tournament was held primarily in Luxembourg, but matches were also played in West Germany, Belgium and France.

== Teams ==
The following teams entered the tournament:

- Austria
- Belgium
- Bulgaria
- Czechoslovakia
- East Germany
- England
- France
- West Germany
- Greece
- Hungary
- Italy
- Luxembourg
- Netherlands
- Poland
- Romania
- Spain
- Turkey
- Yugoslavia

== Group stage ==
=== Group A ===
| Teams | Pld | W | D | L | GF | GA | GD | Pts |
|---|---|---|---|---|---|---|---|---|
| France | 3 | 2 | 1 | 0 | 8 | 2 | +6 | 5 |
| Bulgaria | 3 | 2 | 0 | 1 | 6 | 8 | –2 | 4 |
| Yugoslavia | 3 | 1 | 1 | 1 | 6 | 5 | +1 | 3 |
| Poland | 3 | 0 | 0 | 3 | 4 | 9 | –5 | 0 |

| 3 April | France | 2–0 | Poland |
| 4 April | France | 2–2 | Yugoslavia |
| 6 April | France | 4–0 | Bulgaria |
| | Yugoslavia | 3–1 | Poland |
| 7 April | Poland | 3–4 | Bulgaria |
| 9 April | Bulgaria | 2–1 | Yugoslavia |

=== Group B ===
| Teams | Pld | W | D | L | GF | GA | GD | Pts |
|---|---|---|---|---|---|---|---|---|
| Italy | 4 | 3 | 1 | 0 | 7 | 3 | +4 | 7 |
| West Germany | 4 | 2 | 2 | 0 | 8 | 5 | +3 | 6 |
| Czechoslovakia | 4 | 2 | 0 | 2 | 9 | 7 | +2 | 4 |
| Austria | 4 | 1 | 0 | 3 | 3 | 8 | –5 | 2 |
| Belgium | 4 | 0 | 1 | 3 | 4 | 8 | –4 | 1 |

| 2 April | West Germany | 2–1 | Austria |
| | Belgium | 1–3 | Czechoslovakia |
| 3 April | West Germany | 3–1 | Czechoslovakia |
| 4 April | Italy | 2–0 | Austria |
| 6 April | Italy | 3–2 | Czechoslovakia |
| | West Germany | 2–2 | Belgium |
| 7 April | Austria | 0–3 | Czechoslovakia |
| | Belgium | 0–1 | Italy |
| 9 April | Austria | 2–1 | Belgium |
| | West Germany | 1–1 | Italy |

=== Group C ===
| Teams | Pld | W | D | L | GF | GA | GD | Pts |
|---|---|---|---|---|---|---|---|---|
| Romania | 4 | 2 | 1 | 1 | 5 | 3 | +2 | 5 |
| Netherlands | 4 | 2 | 1 | 1 | 6 | 5 | +1 | 5 |
| Hungary | 4 | 2 | 0 | 2 | 7 | 7 | 0 | 4 |
| Greece | 4 | 1 | 1 | 2 | 3 | 4 | –1 | 3 |
| Turkey | 4 | 1 | 1 | 2 | 1 | 3 | –2 | 3 |

| 2 April | Greece | 1–0 | Romania |
| | Netherlands | 3–2 | Hungary |
| 4 April | Romania | 2–1 | Hungary |
| | Greece | abd (0–0) | Turkey (match abandoned) |
| 5 April | Hungary | 1–0 | Turkey |
| | Romania | 3–1 | Netherlands |
| 6 April | Greece | 0–1 | Turkey (replay) |
| 7 April | Netherlands | 2–0 | Turkey |
| | Hungary | 3–2 | Greece |
| 9 April | Romania | 0–0 | Turkey |
| | Greece | 0–0 | Netherlands |

=== Group D ===
| Teams | Pld | W | D | L | GF | GA | GD | Pts |
|---|---|---|---|---|---|---|---|---|
| England | 3 | 2 | 1 | 0 | 8 | 2 | +6 | 5 |
| Spain | 3 | 2 | 1 | 0 | 7 | 4 | +3 | 5 |
| East Germany | 3 | 1 | 0 | 2 | 4 | 4 | 0 | 2 |
| Luxembourg | 3 | 0 | 0 | 3 | 2 | 11 | –9 | 0 |

| 5 April | Spain | 2–2 | England |
| | East Germany | 3–1 | Luxembourg |
| 7 April | Spain | 3–1 | Luxembourg |
| | East Germany | 0–1 | England |
| 9 April | England | 5–0 | Luxembourg |
| | Spain | 2–1 | East Germany |

== Semifinals ==
11 April 1958

| Italy | 3 – 0 | France |

Esch-sur-Alzette, Luxembourg
11 April 1958

| England | 1 – 0 | Romania |

Luxembourg (city), Luxembourg

== Third place match ==
13 April 1958

| France | 3 – 0 | Romania |

Rodange, Luxembourg

== Final ==
13 April 1958

| Italy | 1 – 0 | England |

Luxembourg (city), Luxembourg

1958 UEFA European Under-18 Championship

Italy
First title
