= 1949 FIFA Youth Tournament Under-18 =

Tournament details
- Host country: Netherlands
- Dates: 18–21 April
- Teams: 7

Final positions
- Champions: France (1st title)
- Runners-up: Netherlands
- Third place: Belgium
- Fourth place: Ireland

Tournament statistics
- Matches played: 9
- Goals scored: 38 (4.22 per match)

The FIFA Youth Tournament Under-18 1949 Final Tournament was held in the Netherlands.

== Teams ==
The following teams entered the tournament:

- Austria
- Belgium
- France
- England
- Netherlands (host)
- Ireland
- Scotland

== First round ==
For this round Belgium received a Bye.

18 April 1949

| Ireland | (c) 3 – 3 | England |

Haarlem
18 April 1949

| France | 3 – 2 | Scotland |

Den Bosch
18 April 1949

| Netherlands | 3 – 1 | Austria |

Utrecht

== Supplementary round ==
In this round the losing teams from the first round participated.

Scotland received a Bye.

19 April 1949

| England | 4 – 2 | Austria |

Zeist

== Semi-finals ==
19 April 1949

| France | 4 – 0 | Belgium |

Hilversum
19 April 1949

| Netherlands | 2 – 0 | Ireland |

Amsterdam

== Fifth-place match ==
21 April 1949

| England | 1 – 0 | Scotland |

Utrecht

== Third place match ==
21 April 1949

| Belgium | 5 – 0 | Ireland |

The Hague

== Final ==
21 April 1949

| France | 4 – 1 | Netherlands |

Rotterdam

1949 FIFA Youth Tournament Under-18

France
First title
