= 1957 UEFA European Under-18 Championship =

Tournament details
- Host country: Spain
- Dates: 14–23 April
- Teams: 15

Final positions
- Champions: Austria (2nd title)
- Runners-up: Spain
- Third place: France; Italy

The UEFA European Under-18 Championship 1957 Final Tournament was held in Spain.

== Teams ==
The following teams entered the tournament:

- Austria
- Belgium
- Czechoslovakia
- East Germany
- England
- France
- West Germany
- Greece
- Hungary
- Italy
- Netherlands
- Poland
- Romania
- Spain (host)
- Turkey

== Group stage ==
=== Group A ===
Teams	Pld	W	D	L	GF	GA	GD	Pts
Italy	2	1	1	0	3	1	+2	3
Turkey	2	1	1	0	3	2	+1	3
East Germany	2	0	0	2	1	4	–3	0

14 April 1957

Italy	2 – 0	East Germany
Sacchella 22'; Nova 51'

El Molinón, Gijón
Attendance: 10.000
16 April 1957

Turkey	2 – 1	East Germany
Yürür 14'; Adatepe 75'	Report	Seiler 27'

Buenavista Stadium, Oviedo
Attendance: 10.000
Referee: Rafael García Fernández (Spain)
18 April 1957

Turkey	1 – 1	Italy
Şencan Fotocan 6'	Report	Fascetti 31'

El Molinón, Gijón
Attendance: 20.000
Referee: Federico Mosquera Maceiras (Spain)

=== Group B ===
Teams	Pld	W	D	L	GF	GA	GD	Pts
Spain	3	2	1	0	13	2	+11	5
West Germany	3	0	3	0	5	5	0	3
Poland	3	1	1	1	4	6	–2	3
Hungary	3	0	1	2	3	12	–9	1

14 April	Hungary	2–2	West Germany
	Spain	4–0	Poland
16 April	Poland	2–2	West Germany
	Spain	8–1	Hungary
18 April	Spain	1–1	West Germany
	Poland	2–0	Hungary

=== Group C ===
Teams	Pld	W	D	L	GF	GA	GD	Pts
Austria	3	3	0	0	11	1	+10	6
Netherlands	3	2	0	1	8	8	0	4
Greece	3	1	0	2	5	10	–5	2
England	3	0	0	3	3	8	–5	0

14 April	Netherlands	2–1	England
	Austria	3–0	Greece
16 April	Austria	3–0	England
	Netherlands	5–2	Greece
18 April	Greece	3–2	England
	Austria	5–1	Netherlands

=== Group D ===
Teams	Pld	W	D	L	GF	GA	GD	Pts
France	3	2	0	1	7	4	+3	4
Czechoslovakia	3	2	0	1	6	4	+2	4
Romania	3	2	0	1	4	3	+1	4
Belgium	3	0	0	3	1	7	–6	0

14 April	France	3–1	Belgium
	Romania	2–1	Czechoslovakia
16 April	Romania	2–0	Belgium
	Czechoslovakia	3–2	France
18 April	Czechoslovakia	2–0	Belgium
	France	2–0	Romania

== Semifinals ==
21 April 1957

Spain	3 – 0	Italy

Chamartín, Madrid
Attendance: 75.000
21 April 1957

Austria	3 – 2	France

Chamartín, Madrid

== Third place match ==
23 April 1957

France	0 – 0 3rd Place Shared	Italy

Chamartín, Madrid

== Final ==
23 April 1957

Austria	3 – 2	Spain

Chamartín, Madrid
Attendance: 90.000

1957 UEFA European Under-18 Championship

Austria
Second title
