= Eeli Kiiskilä =

Finnish footballer

Personal information
- Date of birth: 5 January 2008 (age 18)
- Place of birth: Pori, Finland
- Height: 1.83 m (6 ft 0 in)
- Position: Midfielder

Team information
- Current team: Inter Turku
- Number: 35

Youth career
- –2021: Musan Salama
- 2021–2024: Jazz

Senior career*
Years	Team	Apps	(Gls)
2024–2026	Jazz	20	(1)
2026–	Inter Turku	19	(1)
2026–	→ Inter Turku II (loan)	6	(0)

International career^{‡}
2023	Finland U15	4	(0)
2023	Finland U16	1	(0)
2026–	Finland U18	3	(0)
- * Club domestic league appearances and goals as of 12 November 2026 ‡ National team caps and goals as of 2 August 2026

Eeli Kiiskilä (born January 5, 2008) is a Finnish professional footballer who plays for Veikkausliiga club Inter Turku.

== Club career ==
Originally from Pori, Kiiskilä's began his career with MuSa. His potential was recognized from an early age and he moved to FC Jazz. He was named the Jazz U15's most exemplary player following the 2021 season. At age fourteen, he was selected to play for TPS in the Huuhkajaliiga as part of a partnership between FC Jazz and the Turku side. In the tournament, he impressed against bigger clubs such as Zenit Saint Petersburg and Midtjylland. Six months later he was chosen for the representative team for his region and advanced to the national tournament final. Despite losing the match, Kiiskilä was named the Player of the Tournament.

Kiiskilä signed a first-team contract with FC Jazz in February 2024. At the time, head coach Tommi Pikkarainen stated that he expected for the player to make his senior debut in the Ykkönen the previous season but he suffered an injury which delayed it. Kiiskilä moved to Veikkausliiga club FC Inter Turku ahead of the 2026 season and made his league debut on 4 April against TPS. He would go on to be a crucial player during the of the Finnish League Cup that season with Inter Turku the eventual champion.

== International career ==
Kiiskilä represented Finland at various youth levels.
