= 1986 UEFA European Under-18 Championship =

Tournament details
- Host country: Yugoslavia
- Dates: 11–15 October
- Teams: 8

Final positions
- Champions: East Germany (3rd title)
- Runners-up: Italy
- Third place: West Germany
- Fourth place: Scotland

Tournament statistics
- Matches played: 10
- Goals scored: 22 (2.2 per match)

The UEFA European Under-18 Championship 1986 Final Tournament was held in Yugoslavia. It also served as the European qualification for the 1987 FIFA World Youth Championship.

== Teams ==
The following teams qualified for the tournament:

- Belgium
- Bulgaria
- East Germany
- West Germany
- Italy
- Romania
- Scotland
- Yugoslavia (host, but still qualified)

== Quarterfinals ==
11 October 1986

East Germany	2 – 0	Yugoslavia
Thomas Ritter 48'; Rico Steinmann 53'

Subotica
Attendance: 2000
Referee: Tullio Lanese (Italy)
11 October 1986

Scotland	1 – 0	Bulgaria
Scott Nisbet

Bačka Topola
Attendance: 4000
Referee: Aron Schmidhuber (West Germany)
11 October 1986

Italy	2 – 1	Belgium
Stefano Impallomeni 30'; Stefano Impallomeni 42'		Marc Schaessens 74'

Sombor
Referee: Gunther Habermann (East Germany)
11 October 1986

West Germany	3 – 0	Romania

Kula
Attendance: 2000
Referee: Frans van den Wijngaert (Belgium)

== Semifinals ==
=== Places 5-8 ===
13 October 1986

Bulgaria	1 – 0	Belgium

Senta
Referee: Dragisa Komadinic (Yugoslavia)
13 October 1986

Yugoslavia	5 – 0	Romania
Igor Berecko 35'; Miladinov 48'; Branko Brnović 53' (pen.); Davor Šuker 58'; Nermin Vazda 87'	Report

Čantavir
Referee: Dimitar Dimitrov (Bulgaria)

=== Places 1-4 ===
13 October 1986

East Germany	1 – 0	West Germany

Sombor
Referee: Kenneth Hope (Scotland)
13 October 1986

Italy	1 – 0	Scotland

Backa Topola
Referee: Ion Crăciunescu (Romania)

== Third place match ==
15 October 1986

West Germany	1 – 0	Scotland

Subotica
Referee: Helmut Kohl (Austria)

== Final ==
15 October 1986

East Germany	3 – 1	Italy
Axel Kruse 30'; Matthias Sammer 42'; Marco Köller 81'		Stefano Impallomeni 17'

Gradski stadion, Subotica
Referee: Lajos Németh (Hungary)

1986 UEFA European Under-18 Championship

East Germany
Third title

== Qualification to World Youth Championship ==
The six best performing teams qualified for the 1987 FIFA World Youth Championship.

- Bulgaria
- East Germany
- West Germany
- Italy
- Scotland
- Yugoslavia

== See also ==
- 1986 UEFA European Under-18 Championship qualifying
