= 1994 UEFA European Under-18 Championship =

Campeonato Europeo Sub-18 1994

Tournament details
- Host country: Spain
- Dates: 24–31 July
- Teams: 8

Final positions
- Champions: Portugal (2nd title)
- Runners-up: Germany
- Third place: Spain
- Fourth place: Netherlands

Tournament statistics
- Matches played: 15
- Goals scored: 55 (3.67 per match)

The UEFA European Under-18 Championship 1994 Final Tournament was held in Spain. It also served as the European qualification for the 1995 FIFA World Youth Championship. Players born on or after 1 August 1975 were eligible to participate in this competition.

== Teams ==
The following teams qualified for the tournament:

- Belarus
- France
- Germany
- Netherlands
- Portugal
- Russia
- Spain (host)
- Sweden

== Group stage ==
=== Group A ===
Teams	Pld	W	D	L	GF	GA	GD	Pts
Portugal	3	3	0	0	6	1	+5	9
Netherlands	3	1	1	1	4	4	0	4
France	3	1	0	2	6	7	–1	3
Sweden	3	0	1	2	2	6	–4	1

24 July	Portugal	3–1	France
	Netherlands	1–1	Sweden
26 July	Netherlands	3–2	France
	Portugal	2–0	Sweden
28 July	France	3–1	Sweden
	Portugal	1–0	Netherlands

=== Group B ===
Teams	Pld	W	D	L	GF	GA	GD	Pts
Germany	3	2	0	1	7	3	+4	6
Spain	3	2	0	1	9	6	+3	6
Russia	3	2	0	1	7	7	0	6
Belarus	3	0	0	3	3	10	–7	0

24 July	Spain	4–2	Russia
	Germany	3–0	Belarus
26 July	Russia	2–1	Germany
	Spain	4–1	Belarus
28 July	Russia	3–2	Belarus
	Germany	3–1	Spain

== Fifth-place match ==
30 July 1994

Russia	2 – 0	France

Badajoz

== Third place match ==
31 July 1994

Spain	5 – 2	Netherlands

Merida
Referee: Graziano Cesari (Italy)

== Final ==
31 July 1994

Portugal	1–1 (a.e.t.)	Germany
Rui Óscar 61'	Report	Gerster 34'
Penalties
	4–1

Merida
Referee: István Vad Sr (Hungary)

1994 UEFA European Under-18 Championship

Portugal
Second title

== Qualification to World Youth Championship ==
The five best performing teams qualified for the 1995 FIFA World Youth Championship.

- Germany
- Netherlands
- Portugal
- Russia
- Spain

== See also ==
- 1994 UEFA European Under-18 Championship qualifying
