= UEFA European Under-19 Championship =

- Organiser(s): UEFA
- Founded: 1948
- Region: Europe
- Teams: Maximum of 54 (qualifying round); 28 (elite round); 8 (finals)
- Related competitions: UEFA European Under-21 Championship; UEFA European Under-17 Championship
- Current champions: Spain (13th title)
- Most championships: Spain (13 titles)
- Website: uefa.com/under19
- 2026 UEFA European Under-19 Championship

The UEFA European Under-19 Championship, or simply the Euro Under-19, is an annual football competition, contested by the European men's under-19 national teams of the UEFA member associations.

Spain is the most successful team in this competition, having won thirteen titles and they are the current champions.

== History and format ==
The competition has been held since 1948. It was originally called the FIFA International Youth Tournament, until it was taken over by UEFA in 1956. In 1980, it was restyled the UEFA European Under-18 Championship. Until the 1997 tournament, players born on or after 1 August the year they turned 19 years were eligible to compete. Since the 1998 tournament, the date limit has been moved back to 1 January. The championship received its current name in 2001, which has been used since the 2002 championship. The contest has been held every year since its inauguration in 1948, except for the period between 1984 and 1992, when it was only held every other year.

The tournament has been played in a number of different formats during its existence. Currently it consists of two stages, similar to UEFA's other European championship competitions. The qualifying stage is open to all UEFA members, and the final stage is contested between eight teams.

During even years, the best finishing teams qualify for the FIFA U-20 World Cup held in the next (odd) year. Currently, five teams can qualify for the World Cup, consisting of the top two of their groups plus the winner of a play-off match between the third-placed teams of each group.

=== Number of teams ===
Year of tournament	Format of the final round	Number of teams
1986–1992	Knockout format	8
1993	Two groups of four teams, third place play-off and final	8
1994	Two groups of four teams, fifth place play-off, third place play-off and final	8
1995–2002	Two groups of four teams, third place play-off and final	8
2003–2015	Two groups of four teams, semi-finals and final	8
2016–present	Two groups of four teams, fifth place play-off (in even years only, for qualifying to FIFA U-20 World Cup), semi-finals and final	8

== Results ==
1. 1948–1954: FIFA Youth Tournament: 7 editions
2. 1955–1980: UEFA Youth Tournament: 24 editions (excluding 1955 and 1956)
3. 1981–2001: UEFA European Under-18 Championship: 17 editions
4. Since 2002: UEFA European Under-19 Championship: 20 editions (excluding 2020 and 2021)

Edition	Year	Host	Final			Third place match (1948–2002) Losing semi-finalists (since 2003)		
Edition	Year	Host	Winner	Score	Runner-up	Third place	Score	Fourth place
1948–1954: FIFA Youth Tournament
1	1948 details	England	England	3–2	Netherlands	Belgium	3–1	Italy
2	1949 details	Netherlands	France	4–1	Netherlands	Belgium	5–0	Ireland
3	1950 details	Austria	Austria	3–2	France	Netherlands	6–0	Luxembourg
4	1951 details	France	Yugoslavia	3–2	Austria	Belgium	1–0	Northern Ireland
5	1952 details	Spain	Spain	0–0 (a.e.t.); Spain won on goal average	Belgium	Austria	5–5; Austria won on coin toss	England
6	1953 details	Belgium	Hungary	2–0	Yugoslavia	Turkey	3–2	Spain
7	1954 details	West Germany	Spain	2–2 (a.e.t.); Spain won on goal average	West Germany	Argentina	1–0	Turkey
1955–1980: UEFA Youth Tournament
—	1955; Details	Italy	Only group matches were played and no winner was declared.					
—	1956; Details	Hungary	Only group matches were played and no winner was declared.					
8	1957; Details	Spain	Austria	3–2	Spain	France & Italy	0–0	Third place was shared
9	1958; Details	Luxembourg	Italy	1–0	England	France	3–0	Romania
10	1959; Details	Bulgaria	Bulgaria	1–0	Italy	Hungary	6–1	East Germany
11	1960; Details	Austria	Hungary	2–1	Romania	Portugal	2–1	Austria
12	1961; Details	Portugal	Portugal	4–0	Poland	West Germany	2–1	Spain
13	1962; Details	Romania	Romania	4–1	Yugoslavia	Czechoslovakia	1–1; Czechoslovakia won on coin toss	Turkey
14	1963; Details	England	England	4–0	Northern Ireland	Scotland	4–2	Bulgaria
15	1964; Details	Netherlands	England	4–0	Spain	Portugal	3–2	Scotland
16	1965; Details	West Germany	East Germany	3–2	England	Czechoslovakia	4–1	Italy
17	1966; Details	Yugoslavia	Italy & Soviet Union	0–0	Title was shared	Yugoslavia	2–0	Spain
18	1967; Details	Turkey	Soviet Union	1–0	England	Turkey	1–1; Turkey won on coin toss	France
19	1968; Details	France	Czechoslovakia	2–1	France	Portugal	4–2	Bulgaria
20	1969; Details	East Germany	Bulgaria	1–1; Bulgaria won on coin toss	East Germany	Soviet Union	1–0	Scotland
21	1970; Details	Scotland	East Germany	1–1; East Germany won on coin toss	Netherlands	Scotland	2–0	France
22	1971; Details	Czechoslovakia	England	3–0	Portugal	East Germany	1–1 (5–3 p)	Soviet Union
23	1972; Details	Spain	England	2–0	West Germany	Poland	0–0 (6–5 p)	Spain
24	1973; Details	Italy	England	3–2 (a.e.t.)	East Germany	Italy	1–0	Bulgaria
25	1974; Details	Sweden	Bulgaria	1–0	Yugoslavia	Scotland	1–0	Greece
26	1975; Details	Switzerland	England	1–0 (g.g.)	Finland	Hungary	2–2 (p)	Turkey
27	1976; Details	Hungary	Soviet Union	1–0	Hungary	Spain	3–0	France
28	1977; Details	Belgium	Belgium	2–1	Bulgaria	Soviet Union	7–2	West Germany
29	1978; Details	Poland	Soviet Union	3–0	Yugoslavia	Poland	3–1	Scotland
30	1979; Details	Austria	Yugoslavia	1–0	Bulgaria	England	0–0 (4–3 p)	France
31	1980; Details	East Germany	England	2–1	Poland	Italy	3–0	Netherlands
1981–2001: UEFA European Under-18 Championship
32	1981; Details	West Germany	West Germany	1–0	Poland	France	1–1 (2–0 p)	Spain
33	1982; Details	Finland	Scotland	3–1	Czechoslovakia	Soviet Union	3–1	Poland
34	1983; Details	England	France	1–0	Czechoslovakia	England	1–1 (4–2 p)	Italy
35	1984; Details	Soviet Union	Hungary	0–0 (3–2 p)	Soviet Union	Poland	2–1	Republic of Ireland
36	1986; Details	Yugoslavia	East Germany	3–1	Italy	West Germany	1–0	Scotland
37	1988; Details	Czechoslovakia	Soviet Union	3–1 (a.e.t.)	Portugal	East Germany	2–0	Spain
38	1990; Details	Hungary	Soviet Union	0–0 (4–2 p)	Portugal	Spain	1–0	England
39	1992; Details	Germany	Turkey	2–1 (g.g.)	Portugal	Norway	1–1 (8–7 p)	England
40	1993; Details	England	England	1–0	Turkey	Spain	2–1	Portugal
41	1994; Details	Spain	Portugal	1–1 (4–1 p)	Germany	Spain	5–2	Netherlands
42	1995; Details	Greece	Spain	4–1	Italy	Greece	5–0	Netherlands
43	1996; Details	France	France	1–0	Spain	England	3–2 (a.e.t.)	Belgium
44	1997; Details	Iceland	France	1–0 (g.g.)	Portugal	Spain	2–1	Republic of Ireland
45	1998; Details	Cyprus	Republic of Ireland	1–1 (4–3 p)	Germany	Croatia	0–0 (5–4 p)	Portugal
46	1999; Details	Sweden	Portugal	1–0	Italy	Republic of Ireland	1–0	Greece
47	2000; Details	Germany	France	1–0	Ukraine	Germany	3–1	Czech Republic
48	2001; Details	Finland	Poland	3–1	Czech Republic	Spain	6–2	FR Yugoslavia
Since 2002: UEFA European Under-19 Championship
49	2002; Details	Norway	Spain	1–0	Germany	Slovakia	2–1	Republic of Ireland
50	2003; Details	Liechtenstein	Italy	2–0	Portugal	Austria and Czech Republic		
51	2004; Details	Switzerland	Spain	1–0	Turkey	Switzerland and Ukraine		
52	2005; Details	Northern Ireland	France	3–1	England	Germany and Serbia and Montenegro		
53	2006; Details	Poland	Spain	2–1	Scotland	Austria and Czech Republic		
54	2007; Details	Austria	Spain	1–0	Greece	France and Germany		
55	2008; Details	Czech Republic	Germany	3–1	Italy	Czech Republic and Hungary		
56	2009; Details	Ukraine	Ukraine	2–0	England	France and Serbia		
57	2010; Details	France	France	2–1	Spain	Croatia and England		
58	2011; Details	Romania	Spain	3–2 (a.e.t.)	Czech Republic	Republic of Ireland and Serbia		
59	2012; Details	Estonia	Spain	1–0	Greece	England and France		
60	2013; Details	Lithuania	Serbia	1–0	France	Portugal and Spain		
61	2014; Details	Hungary	Germany	1–0	Portugal	Austria and Serbia		
62	2015; Details	Greece	Spain	2–0	Russia	France and Greece		
63	2016; Details	Germany	France	4–0	Italy	England and Portugal		
64	2017; Details	Georgia	England	2–1	Portugal	Czech Republic and Netherlands		
65	2018; Details	Finland	Portugal	4–3 (a.e.t.)	Italy	France and Ukraine		
66	2019; Details	Armenia	Spain	2–0	Portugal	France and Republic of Ireland		
-	~~2020~~; Details	Northern Ireland	Cancelled due to COVID-19 pandemic					
-	~~2021~~; Details	Romania	Cancelled due to COVID-19 pandemic					
67	2022; Details	Slovakia	England	3–1 (a.e.t.)	Israel	France and Italy		
68	2023; Details	Malta	Italy	1–0	Portugal	Norway and Spain		
69	2024; Details	Northern Ireland	Spain	2–0	France	Italy and Ukraine		
70	2025; Details	Romania	Netherlands	1–0	Spain	Germany and Romania		
71	2026; Details	Wales	Spain	2–0	Germany	Croatia and Ukraine		
72	2027; Details	Czechia						
73	2028; Details	Bulgaria						
74	2029; Details	Netherlands						

== Statistics ==
=== Performances by countries ===
Team	Titles	Runners-up	Third place	Fourth place	Semi-finalists	Total (top four)
Spain	13 (1952, 1954, 1995, 2002, 2004, 2006, 2007, 2011, 2012, 2015, 2019, 2024, 2026)	5 (1957, 1964, 1996, 2010, 2025)	6	6	1	30
England	11 (1948, 1963, 1964, 1971, 1972, 1973, 1975, 1980, 1993, 2017, 2022)	5 (1958, 1965, 1967, 2005, 2009)	3	3	3	25
France	8 (1949, 1983, 1996, 1997, 2000, 2005, 2010, 2016)	4 (1950, 1968, 2013, 2024)	3	4	7	26
Russia (Note: Includes Soviet Union)	6 (1966*, 1967, 1976, 1978, 1988, 1990)	2 (1984, 2015)	3	1		12
Portugal	4 (1961, 1994, 1999, 2018)	10 (1971, 1988, 1990, 1992, 1997, 2003, 2014, 2017, 2019, 2023)	3	2	2	21
Italy	4 (1958, 1966*, 2003, 2023)	7 (1959, 1986, 1995, 1999, 2008, 2016, 2018)	3	3	2	19
Germany (Note: Until 1990 known as West Germany.)	3 (1981, 2008, 2014)	6 (1954, 1972, 1994, 1998, 2002, 2026)	3	1	3	15
Serbia (Note: FIFA recognizes Serbia as the successor team of Yugoslavia.)	3 (1951, 1979, 2013)	4 (1953, 1962, 1974, 1978)	1	1	4	13
Bulgaria	3 (1959, 1969, 1974)	2 (1977, 1979)		3		8
Hungary	3 (1953, 1960, 1984)	1 (1976)	2		1	7
East Germany	3 (1965, 1970, 1986)	2 (1969, 1973)	2	1		8
Austria	2 (1950, 1957)	1 (1951)	1	1	3	8
Czech Republic (Note: Includes Czechoslovakia)	1 (1968)	4 (1982, 1983, 2001, 2011)	2	1	4	12
Poland	1 (2001)	3 (1961, 1980, 1981)	3	1		8
Netherlands	1 (2025)	3 (1948, 1949, 1970)	1	3	1	9
Turkey	1 (1992)	2 (1993, 2004)	2	3		4
Slovakia (Note: Includes Czechoslovakia)	1 (1968)	2 (1982, 1983)	1			4
Scotland	1 (1982)	1 (2006)	3	4		9
Belgium	1 (1977)	1 (1952)	3	1		6
Romania	1 (1962)	1 (1960)		1	1	4
Ukraine	1 (2009)	1 (2000)			4	6
Republic of Ireland	1 (1998)		1	3	2	7
Greece		2 (2007, 2012)	1	2	1	6
Northern Ireland		1 (1963)		2		3
Finland		1 (1975)				1
Israel		1 (2022)				1
Croatia			1		2	3
Norway			1		1	2
Argentina			1			8
Luxembourg				1		1
Switzerland					1	1

Note:
1954 Third place Argentina.
1966 Title Shared between Italy and Soviet Union.
1957 Third place Shared between Italy and France.

== Awards ==
=== Player of the Tournament ===
For certain tournaments, the official website UEFA.com subsequently named a Player of the Tournament or Golden Player.

European Championship	Player
2002 Norway	(Spain) Fernando Torres
2003 Liechtenstein	(Italy) Alberto Aquilani
2004 Switzerland	(Spain) Juanfran
2005 Northern Ireland	(France) Abdoulaye Baldé
2006 Poland	(Spain) Alberto Bueno
2007 Austria	(Greece) Sotiris Ninis
2008 Czech Republic	(Germany) Lars Bender (Germany) Sven Bender
2009 Ukraine	(Ukraine) Kyrylo Petrov
2010 France	(France) Gaël Kakuta
2011 Romania	(Spain) Álex Fernández
2012 Estonia	(Spain) Gerard Deulofeu
2013 Lithuania	(Serbia) Aleksandar Mitrović
2014 Hungary	(Germany) Davie Selke
2015 Greece	(Spain) Marco Asensio
2016 Germany	(France) Jean-Kévin Augustin
2017 Georgia	(England) Mason Mount
2018 Finland	—
2019 Armenia	—
2022 Slovakia	—
2023 Malta	(Italy) Luis Hasa
2024 Northern Ireland	(Spain) Iker Bravo
2025 Romania	(Netherlands) Kees Smit
2026 Wales	(Spain) Quim Junyent

=== Top goalscorer ===
The Top goalscorer award is awarded to the player who scores the most goals during the tournament.

European Championship	Top goalscorer(s)	Goals
2002 Norway	(Spain) Fernando Torres	4
2003 Liechtenstein	(Portugal) Paulo Sérgio	5
2004 Switzerland	(Turkey) Ali Öztürk (Poland) Łukasz Piszczek	4
2005 Northern Ireland	(Serbia and Montenegro) Borko Veselinović	5
2006 Poland	(Spain) Alberto Bueno (Turkey) İlhan Parlak	5
2007 Austria	(Germany) Änis Ben-Hatira (Greece) Kostantinos Mitroglou (France) Kévin Monnet-Paquet	3
2008 Czech Republic	(Czech Republic) Tomáš Necid	4
2009 Ukraine	(England) Nathan Delfouneso	4
2010 France	(Spain) Dani Pacheco	4
2011 Romania	(Spain) Álvaro Morata	6
2012 Estonia	(Spain) Jesé	5
2013 Lithuania	(Lithuania) Gratas Sirgedas (Netherlands) Anass Achahbar (Portugal) Alexandre Guedes	3
2014 Hungary	(Germany) Davie Selke	6
2015 Greece	(Spain) Borja Mayoral	3
2016 Germany	(France) Jean-Kévin Augustin	6
2017 Georgia	(England) Ben Brereton (England) Ryan Sessegnon (Netherlands) Joël Piroe (Sweden) Viktor Gyökeres	3
2018 Finland	(Portugal) Jota (Portugal) Francisco Trincão	5
2019 Armenia	(Portugal) Gonçalo Ramos	4
2022 Slovakia	(France) Loum Tchaouna	4
2023 Malta	(Spain) Víctor Barberá	4
2024 Northern Ireland	(Norway) Daniel Braut	3
2025 Romania	(Germany) Said El Mala (Germany) Max Moerstedt (Netherlands) Kees Smit (Spain) Pablo García	4
2026 Wales	(Germany) Otto Stange (Spain) José Morante	4

== Comprehensive team results by tournament at the FIFA U-20 World Cup ==
Legend

- 1st – Champions
- 2nd – Runners-up
- 3rd – Third place
- 4th – Fourth place
- QF – Quarterfinals
- R2 – Round 2
- R1 – Round 1
- – Hosts
- – Not affiliated to UEFA
- Q – Qualified for upcoming tournament

Team	(Tunisia) 1977	(Japan) 1979	(Australia) 1981	(Mexico) 1983	(Soviet Union) 1985	(Chile) 1987	(Saudi Arabia) 1989	(Portugal) 1991	(Australia) 1993	(Qatar) 1995	(Malaysia) 1997	(Nigeria) 1999	(Argentina) 2001	(United Arab Emirates) 2003	(Netherlands) 2005	(Canada) 2007	(Egypt) 2009	(Colombia) 2011	(Turkey) 2013	(New Zealand) 2015	(South Korea) 2017	(Poland) 2019	(Argentina) 2023	(Chile) 2025	(Azerbaijan) (Uzbekistan) 2027	(Armenia) (Georgia (country)) 2029	Total
Austria	R1			R1												4th		R1		R2							5
Armenia	Part of Soviet Union																									Q	1
Azerbaijan	Part of Soviet Union																								Q		1
Belgium											R2																1
Bulgaria					QF	QF																					2
Croatia	Part of Yugoslavia											R2						R1	R2						Q		4
Czech Republic				R1			R1						QF	R1		2nd	R2										6
East Germany						3rd	R1		Reunified with West Germany																		2
England			4th		R1			R1	3rd		R2	R1		R1			R1	R2	R1		1st		R2				12
Finland													R1														1
France	R1										QF		QF					4th	1st		R2	R2	R1	4th			9
Georgia	Part of Soviet Union																									Q	1
Germany			1st			2nd			R1	R1		R1	R2	R1	QF		QF			QF	R2				Q		12
Greece																			R2								1
Hungary	R1	R1			R1						R1						3rd			R2							6
Israel																							3rd				1
Italy	R1		R1			QF									QF		QF				3rd	4th	2nd	R2			9
Netherlands				QF			R1			R1			QF		QF												4
Norway							R1		R1													R1		QF			4
Poland		4th	R1	3rd												R2						R2					5
Portugal		QF					1st	1st	R1	3rd		R2				R2		2nd	R2	QF	QF	R1					12
Republic of Ireland					R1			R1			3rd	R2		R2													5
Romania			3rd																								1
Russia	1st	2nd		R1	4th		QF	3rd	QF	QF																	8
Scotland				QF		QF										R1											3
Serbia		R1				1st														1st							3
Slovakia														R2									R2				4
Spain	R1	QF	R1		2nd		R1	QF		4th	QF	1st		2nd	QF	QF	R2	QF	QF					QF	Q		17
Sweden								R1																			1
Switzerland															R1												1
Turkey									R1						R2				R2								3
Ukraine	Part of Soviet Union												R2		R2					R2		1st		R2	Q		6

== See also ==
- UEFA European Championship
- UEFA European Under-21 Championship
- UEFA European Under-17 Championship
