= Germany national youth football team =

National association football team

Germany Youth Teams
- Association: Deutscher Fußball-Bund
- Head coach: Various
- Captain: Jaskô Muller
First colours	Second colours	Anniversary colours

This article includes current squads of Germany U-19 and U-18 national football teams.

== Main coaches ==
Position	Name
Under-19 coach	(Germany) Christian Wörns
Under-18 coach	(Germany) Hanno Balitsch
Under-17 coach	(Germany) Marc-Patrick Meister
Under-16 coach	(Germany) Michael Prus
Under-15 coach	(Germany) Marc-Patrick Meister

== Germany national under-19 squad ==
=== Current squad ===
- The following players were called up for the friendly matches.
- Match dates: 27 May 2026
- Opposition: Slovakia
- Caps and goals correct as of: 31 March 2026, after the match against Austria

No.	Pos.	Player	Date of birth (age)	Caps	Goals	Club
	GK	Enis Kamga	8 July 2007 (age 19)	4	0	(German Football Association) 1. FC Kaiserslautern
	GK	Tom Wisbereit	17 November 2007 (age 18)	0	0	(German Football Association) Union Berlin
	DF	Jan Bürger	10 March 2007 (age 19)	0	0	(German Football Association) VfL Wolfsburg
	DF	Montrell Culbreath	29 August 2007 (age 19)	10	2	(German Football Association) Bayer Leverkusen
	DF	Luca Erlein	5 July 2007 (age 19)	6	1	(German Football Association) 1899 Hoffenheim
	DF	Kacper Koscierski	23 June 2007 (age 19)	7	0	(German Football Association) VfL Bochum
	DF	Ben Nink	4 July 2007 (age 19)	4	0	(German Football Association) Wehen Wiesbaden
	DF	Rafael Pinto Pedrosa	30 September 2007 (age 19)	8	0	(German Football Association) Karlsruher SC
	DF	Mick Schmetgens	27 February 2007 (age 19)	9	1	(German Football Association) Werder Bremen
	MF	Mirza Ćatović	1 May 2007 (age 19)	3	0	(German Football Association) VfB Stuttgart
	MF	Luis Engelns	11 March 2007 (age 19)	7	0	(German Football Association) 1899 Hoffenheim
	MF	Francis Onyeka	29 April 2007 (age 19)	9	10	(German Football Association) VfL Bochum
	MF	Tiago Poller	27 February 2007 (age 19)	3	0	(German Football Association) 1899 Hoffenheim
	MF	Niklas Swider	5 January 2007 (age 19)	3	0	(German Football Association) Borussia Mönchengladbach
	FW	Taycan Etcibasi	21 May 2007 (age 19)	3	0	(German Football Association) Borussia Dortmund
	FW	Emmanuel Chigozie Owen	11 June 2007 (age 19)	0	0	(German Football Association) Bayer Leverkusen
	FW	Moritz Reimers	13 February 2007 (age 19)	6	0	(German Football Association) Hamburger SV
	FW	Otto Stange	9 February 2007 (age 19)	7	7	(German Football Association) Hamburger SV
	FW	Yannik Wagner	9 May 2007 (age 19)	0	0	(German Football Association) 1. FC Heidenheim
	FW	Mika Wallentowitz	28 December 2007 (age 18)	3	0	(German Football Association) Schalke 04

=== Recent call-ups ===
The following players have been called up to the squad within the last twelve months and remain eligible for selection.

Pos.	Player	Date of birth (age)	Caps	Goals	Club	Latest call-up

== Germany national under-18 squad ==
=== Current squad ===
The following players were named in the squad for the friendly match against Tunisia on 26 May 2026.

Caps and goals are correct as of 18 November 2025, after the match against Denmark.

No.	Pos.	Player	Date of birth (age)	Caps	Goals	Club
	GK	Theo Menapace	19 August 2008 (age 18)	0	0	(German Football Association) Greuther Fürth
	GK	Simeon Rapsch	9 February 2008 (age 18)	0	0	(German Football Association) Bayer Leverkusen
	GK	Marcello Trippel	3 January 2008 (age 18)	0	0	(German Football Association) Borussia Mönchengladbach
	DF	Oluwajimi Adetokunbo-Adelenu	3 January 2008 (age 18)	4	0	(German Football Association) Hertha BSC
	DF	Nebe-Sirak Domnic	16 November 2008 (age 17)	0	0	(German Football Association) Bayer Leverkusen
	DF	Ben Kieffer	17 February 2008 (age 18)	1	0	(German Football Association) Jahn Regensburg
	DF	Roméo Ritter	30 March 2008 (age 18)	0	0	(German Football Association) Borussia Dortmund
	DF	Fin-Luca Rüdiger	27 April 2008 (age 18)	2	0	(German Football Association) Hannover 96
	DF	Niklas Scheller	13 October 2008 (age 18)	0	0	(German Football Association) Eintracht Frankfurt
	DF	Collin Schramm	3 May 2008 (age 18)	3	0	(German Football Association) VfB Stuttgart
	DF	Dahrel Tchitchi	11 November 2008 (age 17)	5	0	(German Football Association) 1. FC Heidenheim
	MF	Jonah Berghoff	6 February 2008 (age 18)	7	0	(German Football Association) Bayer Leverkusen
	MF	Mads Bröcker	3 June 2008 (age 18)	4	1	(German Football Association) RB Leipzig
	MF	Benno Kaltefleiter	14 February 2008 (age 18)	0	0	(German Football Association) RB Leipzig
	MF	Toni Langsteiner	4 August 2008 (age 18)	0	0	(German Football Association) RB Leipzig
	MF	Jeremiah Mensah	21 February 2008 (age 18)	3	0	(German Football Association) Bayer Leverkusen
	MF	Mathieu Nguefack	14 May 2008 (age 18)	0	0	(German Football Association) Borussia Mönchengladbach
	MF	Paul Wollenberg	12 October 2008 (age 18)	0	0	(German Football Association) SC Paderborn
	FW	Maik Afri Akumu	13 July 2008 (age 18)	0	0	(German Football Association) 1. FC Köln
	FW	Noah Ajayi	23 November 2008 (age 17)	2	0	(The Football Association) Manchester United
	FW	Lasse Eickel	28 February 2008 (age 18)	3	0	(German Football Association) SC Paderborn
	FW	Niklas Hildebrandt	8 July 2008 (age 18)	0	0	(German Football Association) Hertha BSC
	FW	Manolo Merx	20 August 2008 (age 18)	1	0	(German Football Association) Darmstadt 98

== Records ==
=== UEFA European Under-19 Football Championship ===
- Winner (1965^{2}, 1970^{2}, 1981^{1}, 1986^{2}, 2008, 2014)
- Runners-up (1954^{1}, 1969^{2}, 1972^{1}, 1973^{2}, 1994, 1998, 2002, 2026)

=== Granatkin Memorial ===
- Winner (1981^{1}, 1984^{1}, 1992, 2006)
- Runners-up (1986^{1})
- Third place (1990^{1})

== Awards ==
=== UEFA European Under-19 Football Championship ===
Individual

- Golden Player: Lars Bender and Sven Bender (jointly 2008), Davie Selke (2014)
- Top Goalscorer: Änis Ben-Hatira (2007), Davie Selke (2014)

== See also ==
- Germany national football team
- Germany national under-21 football team
- Germany national under-17 football team
- FIFA U-20 World Cup
- FIFA U-17 World Cup
- UEFA European Under-19 Championship
- UEFA European Under-17 Championship

=== Notes ===
1 = as West Germany
2 = as East Germany
