= Soviet Union national under-18 football team =

Soviet Union U-18
- Nickname: Lads (Юноши)
- Association: Football Federation of the Soviet Union
- Confederation: UEFA (Europe)
- Head coach: -
- FIFA code: URS
First colours	Second colours

UEFA European Under-19 Football Championship
- Appearances: 20 (first in 1962)
- Best result: Winners, 1966 (shared), 1967, 1976, 1978, 1988, 1990

The Soviet national lads football team was the under-18 football team of the Soviet Union. For world competitions it was reorganized into under-20 team. It ceased to exist on the breakup of the Union.

It was the oldest existing junior national football team until 1972 with introduction of the national under-23 team. Following the realignment of UEFA's youth competitions in 1962, the Soviet Union Under-18 team was formed. The competition has been held since 1948. It was originally called the FIFA junior tournament, until it was taken over by UEFA in 1955 (UEFA Junior Tournament).

In 1980, UEFA competitions for under-18 teams were officially restyled as the European Under 18 Football Championship. The team had a good record, winning the competition sixth times, reaching the final once, but failing to qualify for the last five on 26 occasions.

After the dissolution of the Soviet Union (on December 26, 1991), the senior team played out its remaining fixtures, which were the finals of Euro 92. Because the Soviet Union under-18s had, by December 26, already failed to qualify for their version of the 1992 European Championship, the former Soviet states didn't play as a combined team at U-19 level ever again.

Of the former Soviet states, only Russia was admitted for the 1992–1993 competition.

== UEFA Junior Tournament Record ==
- 1957: Did not enter.
- 1958: Did not enter.
- 1959: Did not enter.
- 1960: Did not enter.
- 1961: Did not enter.
- 1962: Group stage.
- 1963: Group stage.
- 1964: Did not enter.
- 1965: Did not enter.
- 1966: Winners (title shared).
- 1967: Winners.
- 1968: Group stage.
- 1969: 3rd place.
- 1970: Group stage.
- 1971: 4th place.
- 1972: Group stage.
- 1973: Group stage.
- 1974: Did not qualify.
- 1975: Group stage.
- 1976: Winners.
- 1977: 3rd place.
- 1978: Winners.
- 1979: Did not qualify.
- 1980: Did not qualify.

== UEFA U-18 Championship Record ==
- 1981: Did not qualify.
- 1982: 3rd place.
- 1983: Group stage.
- 1984: Runners-up.
- 1986: Did not qualify. Finished 3rd of 4 in qualification group.
- 1988: Winners.
- 1990: Winners.
- 1992: Losing quarter-finalists as CIS.

== See also ==
- Soviet Union national football team
- Soviet Union national under-20 football team
- Soviet Union national under-16 football team
- UEFA European Under-19 Football Championship
