= Greece national under-18 football team =

Greece Under-18
- Association: Hellenic Football Federation
- Confederation: UEFA
- Head coach: Anastasios Theos
- FIFA code: GRE
First colours	Second colours

The Greece national under-18 football team is the association football team that represents the nation of Greece at the under-18 level.

== Results and schedule ==
The following is a list of match results from the previous 12 months, as well as any future matches that have been scheduled.

=== 2026 ===
28 September 2026 2026 Ježek Cup	Greece	1–2	Slovakia	Český Brod, Czech Republic
17:00	Souvlatzis 78'	Report	Vicena 58'; Prekop 90'	Stadium: Stadion Na Kutilce

30 September 2026 2026 Ježek Cup	Switzerland	2–4	Greece	Kosmonosy, Czech Republic
17:00	Gigon 2'; Azemi 60'	Report	Souvlatzis 4', 9', 14'; Psyroukis 23'	Stadium: Stadion SK Kosmonosy

3 October 2026 2026 Ježek Cup	Czech Republic	3–1	Greece	Český Brod, Czech Republic
12:00	Pammenter 49'; Volf 90+3'; Azaka 90+4'	Report	Moysiadis 10'	Stadium: Stadion Na Kutilce; Attendance: 620

== Current squad ==
- The following players were called up for the Ježek Cup in the Czech Republic.
- Match date: 28 September–3 October 2026
- Caps and goals correct as of: 28 September 2026

No.	Pos.	Player	Date of birth (age)	Caps	Goals	Club
	GK	Christos Gitonas	28 September 2009 (age 17)	1	0	(Hellenic Football Federation) Panathinaikos
	GK	Konstantinos Kyriazis	28 February 2009 (age 17)	1	0	(United States Soccer Federation) Real Salt Lake Academy
	GK	Georgios Nikolaidis	28 February 2009 (age 17)	1	0	(Hellenic Football Federation) PAOK U19
	DF	Georgios Gousios	29 April 2009 (age 17)	3	0	(Hellenic Football Federation) Olympiacos U19
	DF	Vasilios Lavdas (captain)	22 January 2009 (age 17)	3	0	(Hellenic Football Federation) Panathinaikos
	DF	Andreas Poulopoulos	31 January 2009 (age 17)	3	0	(German Football Association) SV Werder Bremen U19
	DF	Georgios Siozios	11 February 2009 (age 17)	3	0	(Hellenic Football Federation) Olympiacos B
	DF	Stefanos Tsigas	27 February 2009 (age 17)	3	0	(Hellenic Football Federation) Panathinaikos U19
	DF	Athanasios Filippiadis	16 February 2009 (age 17)	3	0	(Hellenic Football Federation) AEK U19
	DF	Nikolaos Chaldezos	4 July 2009 (age 17)	3	0	(Hellenic Football Federation) PAOK U19
	DF	Giannis Psyroukis	7 April 2009 (age 17)	3	1	(Hellenic Football Federation) PAOK U19
	MF	Matias Zogu	12 January 2009 (age 17)	2	0	(Hellenic Football Federation) Asteras Tripolis U19
	MF	Christos Kostoglou	27 June 2009 (age 17)	1	0	(Hellenic Football Federation) PAOK B
	MF	Panagiotis Biniaris	25 July 2009 (age 17)	3	0	(Hellenic Football Federation) Panathinaikos
	MF	Alexandros Moysiadis	5 February 2009 (age 17)	3	1	(Hellenic Football Federation) Olympiacos U19
	MF	Konstantinos Papadakis	27 April 2009 (age 17)	3	0	(Hellenic Football Federation) OFI U19
	MF	Sarafianos Papasarafianos	31 January 2009 (age 17)	3	0	(Hellenic Football Federation) Aris
	MF	Fabio Refatllari	21 August 2009 (age 17)	2	0	(Hellenic Football Federation) Volos
	FW	Argyris Argyriou	5 March 2009 (age 17)	3	0	(Hellenic Football Federation) AEK U19
	FW	Leonidas Vasiliadis	25 October 2009 (age 16)	3	0	(German Football Association) Fortuna Düsseldorf U19
	FW	Konstantinos Karangelis	7 June 2009 (age 17)	3	0	(German Football Association) VfB Stuttgart U19
	FW	Alexios Bairamidis	10 November 2009 (age 16)	2	0	(Hellenic Football Federation) Panionios
	FW	Iason Nebis	9 February 2009 (age 17)	3	0	(Hellenic Football Federation) Panathinaikos
	FW	Konstantinos Souvlatzis	31 August 2009 (age 17)	3	4	(Hellenic Football Federation) PAOK U19
