= 1981–82 European Cup =

European football tournament

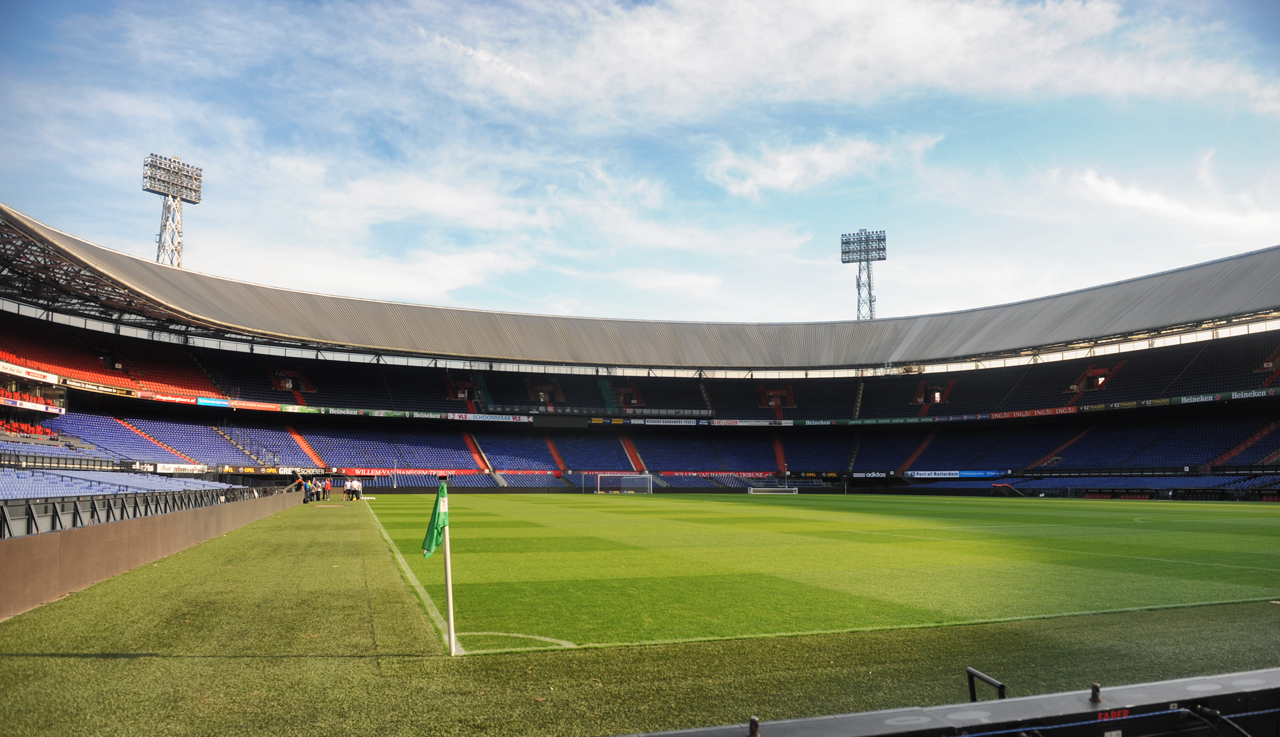
- De Kuip in Rotterdam hosted the final.

Tournament details
- Dates: 26 August 1981 – 26 May 1982
- Teams: 33

Final positions
- Champions: (England) Aston Villa (1st title)
- Runners-up: (West Germany) Bayern Munich

Tournament statistics
- Matches played: 63
- Goals scored: 170 (2.7 per match)
- Attendance: 1,675,358 (26,593 per match)
- Top scorer(s): Dieter Hoeneß (Bayern Munich); 7 goals

The 1981–82 European Cup was the 27th season of the European Cup, UEFA's premier club football competition. The tournament was won for the only time by Aston Villa in the final against Bayern Munich. It was the sixth consecutive year that an English club won the competition. Liverpool, the defending champions, were eliminated by CSKA Sofia in the quarter-finals.

The final is remembered mainly for the performance of young stand-in goalkeeper Nigel Spink who made a host of saves from the experienced Bayern players. Villa's winning goal came from Peter Withe who converted Tony Morley's cross in off the post.

== Teams ==
(Albania) Partizani (1st)	Austria Wien (1st)	(Belgium) Anderlecht (1st)
(Bulgaria) CSKA Sofia (1st)	(Cyprus) Omonia (1st)	(Czechoslovakia) Baník Ostrava (1st)
(Denmark) KB (1st)	(England) Aston Villa (1st)	(England) Liverpool (5th)^{TH}
(Finland) OPS (1st)	(France) Saint-Étienne (1st)	(East Germany) BFC Dynamo (1st)
(West Germany) Bayern Munich (1st)	(Greece) Olympiacos (1st)	(Hungary) Ferencváros (1st)
(Iceland) Valur (1st)	(Republic of Ireland) Athlone Town (1st)	(Italy) Juventus (1st)
(Luxembourg) Progrès Niedercorn (1st)	(Malta) Hibernians (1st)	(Netherlands) AZ (1st)
(Northern Ireland) Glentoran (1st)	(Norway) Start (1st)	(Poland) Widzew Łódź (1st)
(Portugal) Benfica (1st)	(Romania) Universitatea Craiova (1st)	(Scotland) Celtic (1st)
(Spain) Real Sociedad (1st)	(Sweden) Öster (1st)	(Switzerland) Zürich (1st)
(Turkey) Trabzonspor (1st)	(Soviet Union) Dynamo Kyiv (1st)	(Socialist Federal Republic of Yugoslavia) Red Star Belgrade (1st)

== Preliminary round ==
Team 1	Agg.	Team 2	1st leg	2nd leg
Saint-Étienne (France)	1–3	(East Germany) BFC Dynamo	1–1	0–2

=== First leg ===
26 August 1981

Saint-Étienne (France)	1–1	(East Germany) BFC Dynamo
Lopez 75'	Report	Lopez 25' (o.g.)

Stade Geoffroy Guichard, Saint-Étienne
Attendance: 12,072
Referee: Clive White (England)

=== Second leg ===
1 September 1981

BFC Dynamo (East Germany)	2–0	(France) Saint-Étienne
Netz 39'; Riediger 83'	Report

Friedrich-Ludwig-Jahn-Stadion, East Berlin
Attendance: 25,000
Referee: Erik Fredriksson (Sweden)

BFC Dynamo won 3-1 on aggregate

== Bracket ==
First round
(Norway) Start	1	0	1
(Netherlands) AZ	3	1	4
(Finland) OPS	0	0	0
(England) Liverpool	1	7	8
(Bulgaria) CSKA Sofia	1	0	1
(Spain) Real Sociedad	0	0	0
(Luxembourg) Progrès Niedercorn	1	0	1
(Northern Ireland) Glentoran	1	4	5
(Denmark) KB (a)	1	2	3
(Republic of Ireland) Athlone Town	1	2	3
(Romania) Universitatea Craiova	3	0	3
(Greece) Olympiacos	0	2	2
(Portugal) Benfica	3	1	4
(Cyprus) Omonoia	0	0	0
(Sweden) Öster	0	0	0
(West Germany) Bayern Munich	1	5	6
Austria Wien	3	0	3
(Albania) Partizani	1	1	2
(Soviet Union) Dynamo Kyïv	1	1	2
(Turkey) Trabzonspor	0	1	1
(East Germany) BFC Dynamo (a)	2	1	3
(Switzerland) Zürich	0	3	3
(England) Aston Villa	5	2	7
(Iceland) Valur	0	0	0
(Poland) Widzew Łódź	1	1	2
(Belgium) Anderlecht	2	4	6
(Scotland) Celtic	1	0	1
(Italy) Juventus	0	2	2
(Hungary) Ferencváros	3	0	3
(Czechoslovakia) Baník Ostrava	2	3	5
(Malta) Hibernians	1	1	2
(Socialist Federal Republic of Yugoslavia) Crvena zvezda	2	8	10

Second round
(Netherlands) AZ	2	2
(England) Liverpool	2	3	5
(Bulgaria) CSKA Sofia	2	1	3
(Northern Ireland) Glentoran	0	2	2
(Denmark) KB	1	1	2
(Romania) Universitatea Craiova	0	4	4
(Portugal) Benfica	0	1	1
(West Germany) Bayern Munich	0	4	4
Austria Wien	0	1	1
(Soviet Union) Dynamo Kyïv	1	1	2
(East Germany) BFC Dynamo	1	1	2
(England) Aston Villa (a)	2	0	2
(Belgium) Anderlecht	3	1	4
(Italy) Juventus	1	1	2
(Czechoslovakia) Baník Ostrava	3	0	3
(Socialist Federal Republic of Yugoslavia) Crvena zvezda	1	3	4

Quarter-finals
(England) Liverpool	1	0	1
(Bulgaria) CSKA Sofia	0	2	2
(Romania) Universitatea Craiova	0	1	1
(West Germany) Bayern Munich	2	1	3
(Soviet Union) Dynamo Kyïv	0	0	0
(England) Aston Villa	0	2	2
(Belgium) Anderlecht	2	2	4
(Socialist Federal Republic of Yugoslavia) Crvena zvezda	1	1	2

Semi-finals
(Bulgaria) CSKA Sofia	4	0	4
(West Germany) Bayern Munich	3	4	7
(England) Aston Villa	1	0	1
(Belgium) Anderlecht	0	0	0

Final
(West Germany) Bayern Munich	0
(England) Aston Villa	1

== First round ==
Team 1	Agg.	Team 2	1st leg	2nd leg
Austria Wien	3–2	(Albania) Partizani	3–1	0–1
Dynamo Kyiv (Soviet Union)	2–1	(Turkey) Trabzonspor	1–0	1–1
BFC Dynamo (East Germany)	3–3 (a)	(Switzerland) Zürich	2–0	1–3
Aston Villa (England)	7–0	(Iceland) Valur	5–0	2–0
Widzew Łódź (Poland)	2–6	(Belgium) Anderlecht	1–4	1–2
Celtic (Scotland)	1–2	(Italy) Juventus	1–0	0–2
Ferencváros (Hungary)	3–5	(Czechoslovakia) Baník Ostrava	3–2	0–3
Hibernians (Malta)	2–10	(Socialist Federal Republic of Yugoslavia) Red Star Belgrade	1–2	1–8
Start (Norway)	1–4	(Netherlands) AZ	1–3	0–1
OPS (Finland)	0–8	(England) Liverpool	0–1	0–7
CSKA Sofia (Bulgaria)	1–0	(Spain) Real Sociedad	1–0	0–0
Progrès Niedercorn (Luxembourg)	1–5	(Northern Ireland) Glentoran	1–1	0–4
KB (Denmark)	3–3 (a)	(Republic of Ireland) Athlone Town	1–1	2–2
Universitatea Craiova (Romania)	3–2	(Greece) Olympiacos	3–0	0–2
Benfica (Portugal)	4–0	(Cyprus) Omonia	3–0	1–0
Öster (Sweden)	0–6	(West Germany) Bayern Munich	0–1	0–5

=== First leg ===
16 September 1981

Austria Wien	3–1	(Albania) Partizani
Steinkogler 26'; Gasselich 27' (pen.), 62' (pen.)	Report	Tomorri 21'

Praterstadion, Vienna
Attendance: 27,000
Referee: Klaus Peschel (East Germany)

16 September 1981
19:00

Dynamo Kyiv (Soviet Union)	1–0	(Turkey) Trabzonspor
Blokhin 74'	Report

Republican Stadium, Kyiv
Attendance: 60,000
Referee: Horst Brummeier (Austria)

16 September 1981

BFC Dynamo (East Germany)	2–0	(Switzerland) Zürich
Schulz 53'; Riediger 59'	Report

Friedrich-Ludwig-Jahn-Stadion, East Berlin
Attendance: 28,000
Referee: Enzo Barbaresco (Italy)

16 September 1981

Aston Villa (England)	5–0	(Iceland) Valur
Morley 6'; Withe 37', 68'; Donovan 40', 69'	Report

Villa Park, Birmingham
Attendance: 20,481
Referee: Daniel Lambert (France)

16 September 1981

Widzew Łódź (Poland)	1–4	(Belgium) Anderlecht
Smolarek 83'	Report	Lozano 37' (pen.), 62'; Frimann 80'; Pétursson 90'

Stadion Miejski, Łódź
Attendance: 28,000
Referee: Henning Lund-Sørensen (Denmark)

16 September 1981

Celtic (Scotland)	1–0	(Italy) Juventus
MacLeod 65'	Report

Celtic Park, Glasgow
Attendance: 61,017
Referee: Charles Corver (Netherlands)

16 September 1981

Ferencváros (Hungary)	3–2	(Czechoslovakia) Baník Ostrava
Pogany 22', 40' (pen.); Szokolai 47'	Report	Lička 76'; Knapp 78' (pen.)

Üllői út, Budapest
Attendance: 28,000
Referee: Walter Eschweiler (West Germany)

16 September 1981

Hibernians (Malta)	1–2	(Socialist Federal Republic of Yugoslavia) Red Star Belgrade
Spiteri-Gonzi 38'	Report	Jurišić 72'; Janković 90'

Empire Stadium, Gżira
Attendance: 5,000
Referee: Oliver Donnelly (Northern Ireland)

16 September 1981

Start (Norway)	1–3	(Netherlands) AZ
Haugen 79'	Report	Peters 16', 23'; Kist 48'

Kristiansand Stadion, Kristiansand
Attendance: 6,149
Referee: Juhani Smolander (Finland)

16 September 1981

OPS (Finland)	0–1	(England) Liverpool
	Report	Dalglish 84'

Raatin Stadion, Oulu
Attendance: 8,400
Referee: Wiesław Bartosik (Poland)

16 September 1981

CSKA Sofia (Bulgaria)	1–0	(Spain) Real Sociedad
Yonchev 89'	Report

Vasil Levski National Stadium, Sofia
Attendance: 10,000
Referee: Bruno Galler (Switzerland)

16 September 1981

Progrès Niedercorn (Luxembourg)	1–1	(Northern Ireland) Glentoran
Meunier 27'	Report	Cleary 1'

Stade Jos Haupert, Niederkorn
Attendance: 800
Referee: Francis Rion (Belgium)

16 September 1981

KB (Denmark)	1–1	(Republic of Ireland) Athlone Town
Tune 10'	Report	O'Connor 4'

Idrætsparken, Copenhague
Attendance: 3,200
Referee: Reidar Bjørnestad (Norway)

16 September 1981

Universitatea Craiova (Romania)	3–0	(Greece) Olympiacos
Cârțu 6'; Irimescu 66'; Țicleanu 89'	Report

Stadionul Central, Craiova
Attendance: 26,000
Referee: Marcel Bacou (France)

16 September 1981

Benfica (Portugal)	3–0	(Cyprus) Omonia
Néné 54'; Filipović 67'; Carlos Manuel 81'	Report

Estádio da Luz, Lisbon
Attendance: 27,500
Referee: Anthony Mangion (Malta)

16 September 1981

Öster (Sweden)	0–1	(West Germany) Bayern Munich
	Report	Rummenigge 75' (pen.)

Värendsvallen, Växjö
Attendance: 20,100
Referee: Clive Thomas (Wales)

=== Second leg ===
30 September 1981

Partizani (Albania)	1–0	Austria Wien
Ballgjini 31'	Report

Stadiumi Kombëtar Qemal Stafa, Tirana
Attendance: 19,000
Referee: Erkan Göksel (Turkey)

Austria Wien won 3–2 on aggregate.

30 September 1981
15:00

Trabzonspor (Turkey)	1–1	(Soviet Union) Dynamo Kyiv
Canalioğlu 27'	Report	Khlus 57'

Hüseyin Avni Aker Stadyumu, Trabzon
Attendance: 25,000
Referee: Bogdan Dochev (Bulgaria)

Dynamo Kyiv won 2–1 on aggregate.

30 September 1981

Zürich (Switzerland)	3–1	(East Germany) BFC Dynamo
Jerković 2', 22', 87'	Report	Ullrich 47'

Letzigrund, Zürich
Attendance: 7,800
Referee: César Correia (Portugal)

3–3 on aggregate; BFC Dynamo won on away goals.

30 September 1981

Valur (Iceland)	0–2	(England) Aston Villa
	Report	Shaw 25', 70'

Laugardalsvöllur, Reykjavík
Attendance: 4,291
Referee: Ole Amundsen (Denmark)

Aston Villa won 7–0 on aggregate.

30 September 1981

Anderlecht (Belgium)	2–1	(Poland) Widzew Łódź
Brylle 6'; Geurts 50'	Report	Smolarek 66'

Stade Émile Versé, Anderlecht
Attendance: 13,000
Referee: Gwyn Owen (Wales)

Anderlecht won 6–2 on aggregate.

30 September 1981

Juventus (Italy)	2–0	(Scotland) Celtic
Virdis 28'; Bettega 40'	Report

Stadio Comunale, Turin
Attendance: 65,000
Referee: Alexis Ponnet (Belgium)

Juventus won 2–1 on aggregate.

30 September 1981

Baník Ostrava (Czechoslovakia)	3–0	(Hungary) Ferencváros
Šreiner 7'; Knapp 14', 56' (pen.)	Report

Bazaly, Ostrava
Attendance: 17,636
Referee: Iordan Zhezhov (Bulgaria)

Baník Ostrava won 5–3 on aggregate.

30 September 1981

Red Star Belgrade (Socialist Federal Republic of Yugoslavia)	8–1	(Malta) Hibernians
Goračinov 1'; Petrović 20', 41'; Šestić 35'; D. Savić 43', 58' (pen.); R. Savić 62', 87'	Report	Spiteri-Gonzi 69'

Marakana, Belgrade
Attendance: 4,596
Referee: Stefanos Hatzistefanou (Cyprus)

Red Star Belgrade won 10–2 on aggregate.

30 September 1981

AZ (Netherlands)	1–0	(Norway) Start
Tol 86'	Report

Alkmaarderhout, Alkmaar
Attendance: 3,500
Referee: Otto Anderco (Romania)

AZ won 4–1 on aggregate.

30 September 1981

Liverpool (England)	7–0	(Finland) OPS
Dalglish 26'; McDermott 40' 75'; R. Kennedy 46'; Johnson 60'; Rush 67'; Lawrenson 72'	Report

Anfield, Liverpool
Attendance: 20,789
Referee: Guðmundur Haraldsson (Iceland)

Liverpool won 8–0 on aggregate.

30 September 1981

Real Sociedad (Spain)	0–0	(Bulgaria) CSKA Sofia
	Report

Estadio de Atocha, San Sebastián
Attendance: 27,000
Referee: Luigi Agnolin (Italy)

CSKA Sofia won 1–0 on aggregate.

30 September 1981

Glentoran (Northern Ireland)	4–0	(Luxembourg) Progrès Niedercorn
Blackledge 30', 76'; Jameson 53'; Manley 75'	Report

The Oval, Belfast
Attendance: 3,673
Referee: Jan Keizer (Netherlands)

Glentoran won 5–1 on aggregate.

30 September 1981

Athlone Town (Republic of Ireland)	2–2	(Denmark) KB
Davis 73', 87'	Report	Larsen 15'; Andersen 53'

St. Mel's Park, Athlone
Attendance: 3,000
Referee: Norbert Rolles (Luxembourg)

3–3 on aggregate; KB won on away goals.

30 September 1981

Olympiacos (Greece)	2–0	(Romania) Universitatea Craiova
Mitropoulos 36'; Anastopoulos 60'	Report

Georgios Karaiskakis Stadium, Athens
Attendance: 27,397
Referee: Eduard Shklovski (Soviet Union)

Universitatea Craiova won 3–2 on aggregate.

30 September 1981

Omonia (Cyprus)	0–1	(Portugal) Benfica
	Report	Chalana 75'

Makario Stadium, Nikosia
Attendance: 4,000
Referee: Stjepan Glavina (Yugoslavia)

Benfica won 4–0 on aggregate.

30 September 1981

Bayern Munich (West Germany)	5–0	(Sweden) Öster
Hoeneß 24', 58'; Rummenigge 27', 68'; Niedermayer 31'	Report

Olympiastadion, Munich
Attendance: 7,800
Referee: Eamonn Farrell (Ireland)

Bayern Munich won 6–0 on aggregate.

== Second round ==
Team 1	Agg.	Team 2	1st leg	2nd leg
Austria Wien	1–2	(Soviet Union) Dynamo Kyiv	0–1	1–1
BFC Dynamo (East Germany)	2–2 (a)	(England) Aston Villa	1–2	1–0
Anderlecht (Belgium)	4–2	(Italy) Juventus	3–1	1–1
Baník Ostrava (Czechoslovakia)	3–4	(Socialist Federal Republic of Yugoslavia) Red Star Belgrade	3–1	0–3
AZ (Netherlands)	4–5	(England) Liverpool	2–2	2–3
CSKA Sofia (Bulgaria)	3–2	(Northern Ireland) Glentoran	2–0	1–2
KB (Denmark)	2–4	(Romania) Universitatea Craiova	1–0	1–4
Benfica (Portugal)	1–4	(West Germany) Bayern Munich	0–0	1–4

=== First leg ===
21 October 1981
18:00

Austria Wien	0–1	(Soviet Union) Dynamo Kyiv
	Report	Bal 23'

Praterstadion, Vienna
Attendance: 25,000
Referee: Otto Anderco (Romania)

21 October 1981

BFC Dynamo (East Germany)	1–2	(England) Aston Villa
Riediger 50'	Report	Morley 5', 85'

Friedrich-Ludwig-Jahn-Sportpark-Stadion, East Berlin
Attendance: 28,000
Referee: Franz Wöhrer (Austria)

21 October 1981

Anderlecht (Belgium)	3–1	(Italy) Juventus
Geurts 24' 56'; Vercauteren 88'	Report	Marocchino 39'

Stade Émile Versé, Brussels
Attendance: 35,000
Referee: Clive White (England)

21 October 1981

Baník Ostrava (Czechoslovakia)	3–1	(Socialist Federal Republic of Yugoslavia) Red Star Belgrade
Lička 2', 44'; Knapp 88'	Report	Krmpotić 51'

Bazaly, Ostrava
Attendance: 15,745
Referee: Bruno Galler (Switzerland)

21 October 1981

AZ (Netherlands)	2–2	(England) Liverpool
Kist 59'; Tol 86'	Report	Johnson 26'; Lee 49'

Olympisch Stadion, Amsterdam
Attendance: 12,700
Referee: Enzo Barbaresco (Italy)

21 October 1981

CSKA Sofia (Bulgaria)	2–0	(Northern Ireland) Glentoran
Dimitrov 8'; Zdravkov 35' (pen.)	Report

Vasil Levski National Stadium, Sofia
Attendance: 23,742
Referee: Theodoris Aspris (Cyprus)

21 October 1981

KB (Denmark)	1–0	(Romania) Universitatea Craiova
Fosgaard 8'	Report

Københavns Idrætspark, Copenhague
Attendance: 5,700
Referee: Aleksander Suchanek (Poland)

21 October 1981

Benfica (Portugal)	0–0	(West Germany) Bayern Munich
	Report

Estádio da Luz, Lisbon
Attendance: 45,000
Referee: Michel Vautrot (France)

=== Second leg ===
4 November 1981
19:00

Dynamo Kyiv (Soviet Union)	1–1	Austria Wien
Buryak 37' (pen.)	Report	Petkov 23'

Republican Stadium, Kyiv
Attendance: 59,400
Referee: Rolf Ericsson (Sweden)

Dynamo Kyiv won 2–1 on aggregate.

4 November 1981

Aston Villa (England)	0–1	(East Germany) BFC Dynamo
	Report	Terletzki 15'

Villa Park, Birmingham
Attendance: 28,175
Referee: Jan Keizer (Netherlands)

2–2 on aggregate; Aston Villa won on away goals.

4 November 1981

Red Star Belgrade (Socialist Federal Republic of Yugoslavia)	3–0	(Czechoslovakia) Baník Ostrava
Ǵurovski 16'; Savić 50'; Petrović 62'	Report

Marakana, Belgrade
Attendance: 57,750
Referee: George Smith (Scotland)

Red Star Belgrade won 4–3 on aggregate.

4 November 1981

Juventus (Italy)	1–1	(Belgium) Anderlecht
Brio 79'	Report	Geurts 41'

Stadio Comunale, Turin
Attendance: 66,279
Referee: Erich Linemayr (Austria)

Anderlecht won 4–2 on aggregate.

4 November 1981

Liverpool (England)	3–2	(Netherlands) AZ
McDermott 42' (pen.); Rush 68'; Hansen 85'	Report	Kist 55'; Thompson 73' (o.g.)

Anfield, Liverpool
Attendance: 29,703
Referee: Walter Eschweiler (West Germany)

Liverpool won 5–4 on aggregate.

4 November 1981

Glentoran (Northern Ireland)	2–1 (a.e.t.)	(Bulgaria) CSKA Sofia
Cleary 67'; Manley 71'	Report	Dimitrov 115'

The Oval, Belfast
Attendance: 4,021
Referee: Henning Lund-Sørensen (Denmark)

CSKA Sofia won 3–2 on aggregate.

4 November 1981

Universitatea Craiova (Romania)	4–1	(Denmark) KB
Crișan 8'; Balaci 25'; Beldeanu 54'; Cămătaru 72'	Report	Andersen 74'

Stadionul Central, Craiova
Attendance: 25,000
Referee: Damir Matovinović (Yugoslavia)

Universitatea Craiova won 4–2 on aggregate.

4 November 1981

Bayern Munich (West Germany)	4–1	(Portugal) Benfica
Hoeneß 28', 36', 55'; Breitner 82'	Report	Nené 63' (pen.)

Olympiastadion, Munich
Attendance: 42,000
Referee: Paolo Casarin (Italy)

Bayern Munich won 4–1 on aggregate.

== Quarter-finals ==
Team 1	Agg.	Team 2	1st leg	2nd leg
Dynamo Kyiv (Soviet Union)	0–2	(England) Aston Villa	0–0	0–2
Anderlecht (Belgium)	4–2	(Socialist Federal Republic of Yugoslavia) Red Star Belgrade	2–1	2–1
Liverpool (England)	1–2	(Bulgaria) CSKA Sofia	1–0	0–2
Universitatea Craiova (Romania)	1–3	(West Germany) Bayern Munich	0–2	1–1

=== First leg ===
3 March 1982
19:00

Dynamo Kyiv (Soviet Union)	0–0	(England) Aston Villa
	Report

Lokomotiv Stadium, Simferopol (Note: Dynamo Kyiv played their home match at Lokomotiv Stadium, Simferopol, instead of their regular stadium Republican Stadium, Kyiv, due to weather conditions.)
Attendance: 30,000
Referee: Walter Eschweiler (West Germany)

3 March 1982

Anderlecht (Belgium)	2–1	(Socialist Federal Republic of Yugoslavia) Red Star Belgrade
Geurts 27'; Lozano 63'	Report	Ǵurovski 52'

Stade Émile Versé, Anderlecht
Attendance: 25,000
Referee: Adolf Prokop (East Germany)

3 March 1982

Liverpool (England)	1–0	(Bulgaria) CSKA Sofia
Whelan 65'	Report

Anfield, Liverpool
Attendance: 27,388
Referee: Georges Konrath (France)

3 March 1982

Universitatea Craiova (Romania)	0–2	(West Germany) Bayern Munich
	Report	Breitner 7'; Rummenigge 20'

Stadionul Central, Craiova
Attendance: 37,500
Referee: Charles Corver (Netherlands)

=== Second leg ===
17 March 1982
19:30

Aston Villa (England)	2–0	(Soviet Union) Dynamo Kyiv
Shaw 7'; McNaught 43'	Report

Villa Park, Birmingham
Attendance: 38,579
Referee: Marcel van Langenhove (Belgium)

Aston Villa won 2–0 on aggregate.

17 March 1982

Red Star Belgrade (Socialist Federal Republic of Yugoslavia)	1–2	(Belgium) Anderlecht
Savić 45' (pen.)	Report	Hofkens 33'; Vercauteren 60'

Marakana, Belgrade
Attendance: 89,806
Referee: Paolo Casarin (Italy)

Anderlecht won 4–2 on aggregate.

17 March 1982

CSKA Sofia (Bulgaria)	2–0 (a.e.t.)	(England) Liverpool
Mladenov 77', 101'	Report

Vasil Levski National Stadium, Sofia
Attendance: 60,000
Referee: Franz Wöhrer (Austria)

CSKA Sofia won 2–1 on aggregate.

17 March 1982

Bayern Munich (West Germany)	1–1	(Romania) Universitatea Craiova
D. Hoeneß 21'	Report	Geolgău 30'

Olympiastadion, Munich
Attendance: 13,000
Referee: Talal Tokat (Turkey)

Bayern Munich won 3–1 on aggregate.

== Semi-finals ==
Team 1	Agg.	Team 2	1st leg	2nd leg
Aston Villa (England)	1–0	(Belgium) Anderlecht	1–0	0–0
CSKA Sofia (Bulgaria)	4–7	(West Germany) Bayern Munich	4–3	0–4

=== First leg ===
7 April 1982

Aston Villa (England)	1–0	(Belgium) Anderlecht
Morley 27'	Report

Villa Park, Birmingham
Attendance: 38,593
Referee: Rolf Eriksson (Sweden)

7 April 1982

CSKA Sofia (Bulgaria)	4–3	(West Germany) Bayern Munich
G. Dimitrov 7'; Yonchev 13', 49'; Zdravkov 18' (pen.)	Report	Dürnberger 27'; D. Hoeneß 32'; Breitner 82'

Vasil Levski National Stadium, Sofia
Attendance: 70,000
Referee: Daniel Lambert (France)

=== Second leg ===
21 April 1982

Bayern Munich (West Germany)	4–0	(Bulgaria) CSKA Sofia
Breitner 43', 47' (pen.); Rummenigge 65', 76'	Report

Olympiastadion, Munich
Attendance: 45,000
Referee: David Syme (Scotland)

Bayern Munich won 7–4 on aggregate.

21 April 1982

Anderlecht (Belgium)	0–0	(England) Aston Villa
	Report

Stade Émile Versé, Anderlecht
Attendance: 28,000
Referee: Dušan Krchňák (Czechoslovakia)

Aston Villa won 1–0 on aggregate.

== Final ==
26 May 1982

Bayern Munich (West Germany)	0–1	(England) Aston Villa
	Report	Withe 67'

De Kuip, Rotterdam
Attendance: 46,776
Referee: Georges Konrath (France)

== Top scorers ==
The top scorers from the 1981–82 European Cup (excluding preliminary round) are as follows:

Rank	Name	Team	Goals
1	(Germany) Dieter Hoeneß	(Germany) Bayern Munich	7
2	(Germany) Karl-Heinz Rummenigge	(Germany) Bayern Munich	6
3	(Germany) Paul Breitner	(Germany) Bayern Munich	5
3	(Belgium) Willy Geurts	(Belgium) Anderlecht	5
5	(Czechoslovakia) Lubomír Knapp	(Czechoslovakia) Baník Ostrava	4
5	(England) Tony Morley	(England) Aston Villa	4
5	(Socialist Federal Republic of Yugoslavia) Dušan Savić	(Socialist Federal Republic of Yugoslavia) Red Star Belgrade	4
8	(Socialist Federal Republic of Yugoslavia) Jurica Jerković	(Switzerland) Zürich	3
8	(Netherlands) Kees Kist	(Netherlands) AZ	3
8	(Czechoslovakia) Verner Lička	(Czechoslovakia) Baník Ostrava	3
8	(Spain) Juan Lozano	(Belgium) Anderlecht	3
8	(England) Terry McDermott	(England) Liverpool	3
8	(Socialist Federal Republic of Yugoslavia) Vladimir Petrović	(Socialist Federal Republic of Yugoslavia) Red Star Belgrade	3
8	(England) Gary Shaw	(England) Aston Villa	3
8	(England) Peter Withe	(England) Aston Villa	3
8	(Bulgaria) Tsvetan Yonchev	(Bulgaria) CSKA Sofia	3
