= 1980–81 European Cup =

European football tournament

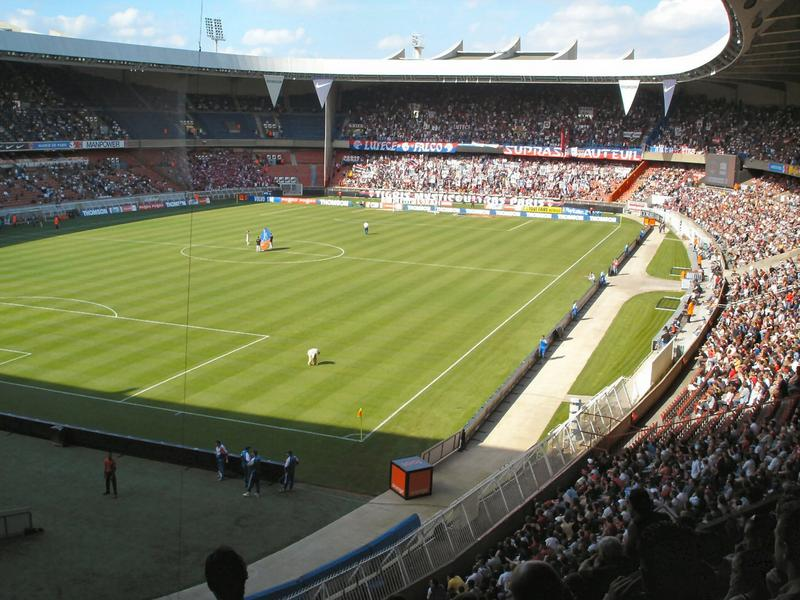
- The Parc des Princes in Paris hosted the final.

Tournament details
- Dates: 16 August 1980 – 27 May 1981
- Teams: 33

Final positions
- Champions: (England) Liverpool (3rd title)
- Runners-up: (Spain) Real Madrid

Tournament statistics
- Matches played: 63
- Goals scored: 166 (2.63 per match)
- Attendance: 1,797,911 (28,538 per match)
- Top scorer(s): Terry McDermott (Liverpool); Karl-Heinz Rummenigge (Bayern Munich); Graeme Souness (Liverpool); 6 goals each

The 1980–81 European Cup was the 26th season of the European Cup, UEFA's premier club football competition. The tournament was won for a third time by Liverpool, who beat six-time champions Real Madrid in the final. In the 11 seasons up to and including this one, there were only four winners of the European Cup (Ajax, Bayern Munich, Nottingham Forest and Liverpool), but there were eleven different runners-up. This sequence was ended the following year, when Bayern Munich lost to first-time finalists Aston Villa.

Nottingham Forest, the defending champions, were eliminated by CSKA Sofia in the first round.

== Teams ==
(Albania) Dinamo Tirana (1st)	Austria Wien (1st)	(Belgium) Club Brugge (1st)
(Bulgaria) CSKA Sofia (1st)	(Cyprus) APOEL (1st)	(Czechoslovakia) Baník Ostrava (1st)
(Denmark) Esbjerg (1st)	(England) Liverpool (1st)	(England) Nottingham Forest (5th)^{TH}
(Finland) OPS (1st)	(France) Nantes (1st)	(East Germany) BFC Dynamo (1st)
(West Germany) Bayern Munich (1st)	(Greece) Olympiacos (1st)	(Hungary) Budapest Honvéd (1st)
(Iceland) ÍBV (1st)	(Republic of Ireland) Limerick (1st)	(Italy) Internazionale (1st)
(Luxembourg) Jeunesse Esch (1st)	(Malta) Valletta (1st)	(Netherlands) Ajax (1st)
(Northern Ireland) Linfield (1st)	(Norway) Viking (1st)	(Poland) Szombierki Bytom (1st)
(Portugal) Sporting CP (1st)	(Romania) Universitatea Craiova (1st)	(Scotland) Aberdeen (1st)
(Spain) Real Madrid (1st)	(Sweden) Halmstad (1st)	(Switzerland) Basel (1st)
(Turkey) Trabzonspor (1st)	(Soviet Union) Spartak Moscow (1st)	(Socialist Federal Republic of Yugoslavia) Red Star Belgrade (1st)

== Preliminary round ==
Team 1	Agg.	Team 2	1st leg	2nd leg
Budapest Honvéd (Hungary)	11–0	(Malta) Valletta	8–0	3–0

=== First leg ===
16 August 1980

Budapest Honvéd (Hungary)	8–0	(Malta) Valletta
Bodonyi 3'; Garaba 4'; Esterházy 25'; Kocsis 43' (pen.); Dajka 54', 83'; Varga 83', 90'	Report

Népstadion, Budapest
Attendance: 1,500
Referee: Ramiz Pregja (Albania)

=== Second leg ===
3 September 1980

Valletta (Malta)	0–3	(Hungary) Budapest Honvéd
	Report	Esterházy 16', 75'; Bodonyi 21'

Empire Stadium, Gżira
Attendance: 2,118
Referee: Peter Scherz (Switzerland)

Budapest Honvéd won 11–0 on aggregate.

== Bracket ==
Round of 32
(Luxembourg) Jeunesse Esch	0	0	0
(Soviet Union) Spartak Moscow	5	4	9
(Sweden) Halmstad	0	2	2
(Denmark) Esbjerg	0	3	3
(Republic of Ireland) Limerick	1	1	2
(Spain) Real Madrid	2	5	7
(Portugal) Sporting CP	0	0	0
(Hungary) Budapest Honvéd	2	1	3
(Northern Ireland) Linfield	0	0	0
(France) Nantes	1	2	3
(Italy) Inter Milan	2	1	3
(Romania) Universitatea Craiova	0	1	1
(Belgium) Club Brugge	0	1	1
(Switzerland) Basel	1	4	5
(Norway) Viking	2	1	3
(Socialist Federal Republic of Yugoslavia) Red Star Belgrade	3	4	7
(Scotland) Aberdeen	1	0	1
Austria Wien	0	0	0
(Finland) OPS	1	1	2
(England) Liverpool	1	10	11
(Bulgaria) CSKA Sofia	1	1	2
(England) Nottingham Forest	0	0	0
(Turkey) Trabzonspor	2	0	2
(Poland) Szombierki Bytom	1	3	4
(Greece) Olympiacos	2	0	2
(West Germany) Bayern Münich	4	3	7
(Albania) Dinamo Tirana	0	0	0
(Netherlands) Ajax	2	1	3
(Iceland) ÍBV	1	0	1
(Czechoslovakia) Baník Ostrava	1	1	2
(East Germany) BFC Dynamo	3	1	4
(Cyprus) APOEL	0	2	2

Round of 16
(Soviet Union) Spartak Moscow	3	0	3
(Denmark) Esbjerg	0	2	2
(Spain) Real Madrid	1	2	3
(Hungary) Budapest Honvéd	0	0	0
(France) Nantes	1	1	2
(Italy) Inter Milan	2	1	3
(Switzerland) Basel	1	0	1
(Socialist Federal Republic of Yugoslavia) Red Star Belgrade	0	2	2
(Scotland) Aberdeen	0	0	0
(England) Liverpool	1	4	5
(Bulgaria) CSKA Sofia	4	1	5
(Poland) Szombierki Bytom	0	0	0
(West Germany) Bayern Münich	5	1	6
(Netherlands) Ajax	1	2	3
(Czechoslovakia) Baník Ostrava (a)	0	1	1
(East Germany) BFC Dynamo	0	1	1

Quarter-finals
(Soviet Union) Spartak Moscow	0	0	0
(Spain) Real Madrid	0	2	2
(Italy) Inter Milan	1	1	2
(Socialist Federal Republic of Yugoslavia) Red Star Belgrade	1	0	1
(England) Liverpool	5	1	6
(Bulgaria) CSKA Sofia	1	0	1
(West Germany) Bayern Münich	2	4	6
(Czechoslovakia) Baník Ostrava	0	2	2

Semi-finals
(Spain) Real Madrid	2	0	2
(Italy) Inter Milan	0	1	1
(England) Liverpool (a)	0	1	1
(West Germany) Bayern Münich	0	1	1

Final
(Spain) Real Madrid	0
(England) Liverpool	1

== First round ==
Team 1	Agg.	Team 2	1st leg	2nd leg
Aberdeen (Scotland)	1–0	Austria Wien	1–0	0–0
OPS (Finland)	2–11	(England) Liverpool	1–1	1–10
CSKA Sofia (Bulgaria)	2–0	(England) Nottingham Forest	1–0	1–0
Trabzonspor (Turkey)	2–4	(Poland) Szombierki Bytom	2–1	0–3
Olympiacos (Greece)	2–7	(West Germany) Bayern Munich	2–4	0–3
Dinamo Tirana (Albania)	0–3	(Netherlands) Ajax	0–2	0–1
ÍBV (Iceland)	1–2	(Czechoslovakia) Baník Ostrava	1–1	0–1
BFC Dynamo (East Germany)	4–2	(Cyprus) APOEL	3–0	1–2
Jeunesse Esch (Luxembourg)	0–9	(Soviet Union) Spartak Moscow	0–5	0–4
Halmstad (Sweden)	2–3	(Denmark) Esbjerg	0–0	2–3
Limerick (Republic of Ireland)	2–7	(Spain) Real Madrid	1–2	1–5
Sporting CP (Portugal)	0–3	(Hungary) Budapest Honvéd	0–2	0–1
Linfield (Northern Ireland)	0–3	(France) Nantes	0–1	0–2
Internazionale (Italy)	3–1	(Romania) Universitatea Craiova	2–0	1–1
Club Brugge (Belgium)	1–5	(Switzerland) Basel	0–1	1–4
Viking (Norway)	3–7	(Socialist Federal Republic of Yugoslavia) Red Star Belgrade	2–3	1–4

=== First leg ===
17 September 1980

Aberdeen (Scotland)	1–0	Austria Wien
McGhee 31'	Report

Pittodrie Stadium, Aberdeen
Attendance: 19,000
Referee: Rolf Nyhus (Norway)

17 September 1980

OPS (Finland)	1–1	(England) Liverpool
Puotiniemi 81'	Report	McDermott 15'

Raatin Stadion, Oulu
Attendance: 13,000
Referee: Rolf Eriksson (Sweden)

17 September 1980

CSKA Sofia (Bulgaria)	1–0	(England) Nottingham Forest
Yonchev 70'	Report

Vasil Levski National Stadium, Sofia
Attendance: 60,000
Referee: Luigi Agnolin (Italy)

17 September 1980

Trabzonspor (Turkey)	2–1	(Poland) Szombierki Bytom
Ünal 36'; Soyak 54'	Report	Wieczorek 87'

Hüseyin Avni Stadyumu, Trabzon
Attendance: 16,481
Referee: Ioan Igna (Romania)

17 September 1980

Olympiacos (Greece)	2–4	(West Germany) Bayern Munich
Galakos 26'; Ahlström 82'	Report	Dremmler 22', 63'; Rummenigge 57'; Kraus 66'

Georgios Karaiskakis Stadium, Athens
Attendance: 34,800
Referee: Károly Palotai (Hungary)

17 September 1980

Dinamo Tirana (Albania)	0–2	(Netherlands) Ajax
	Report	Arnesen 69', 89'

Stadiumi Kombëtar Qemal Stafa, Tirana
Attendance: 31,000
Referee: Nikolaos Zlatanos (Greece)

17 September 1980

ÍBV (Iceland)	1–1	(Czechoslovakia) Baník Ostrava
Þorleifsson 28'	Report	Daněk 42'

Kópavogsvöllur, Kópavogur
Attendance: 928
Referee: Frederick McKnight (Northern Ireland)

17 September 1980

BFC Dynamo (East Germany)	3–0	(Cyprus) APOEL
Terletzki 51'; Trieloff 72'; Schulz 87'	Report

Friedrich-Ludwig-Jahn-Stadion, East Berlin
Attendance: 15,100
Referee: Ib Nielsen (Denmark)

17 September 1980

Jeunesse Esch (Luxembourg)	0–5	(Soviet Union) Spartak Moscow
	Report	Gavrilov 1', 31', 68'; Khidiyatullin 43'; Yartsev 84'

Stade de la Frontière, Esch-sur-Alzette
Attendance: 1,800
Referee: Rudolf Renggli (Switzerland)

17 September 1980

Halmstad (Sweden)	0–0	(Denmark) Esbjerg
	Report

Örjans Vall, Halmstad
Attendance: 2,581
Referee: Antonin Vencl (Czechoslovakia)

17 September 1980

Limerick (Republic of Ireland)	1–2	(Spain) Real Madrid
Kennedy 51'	Report	Juanito 71' (pen.); Pineda 85'

Lansdowne Road, Dublin
Attendance: 7,000
Referee: Ole Amundsen (Denmark)

17 September 1980

Sporting CP (Portugal)	0–2	(Hungary) Budapest Honvéd
	Report	Bodonyi 50'; Nagy 65'

Estádio do Bonfim, Setúbal
Attendance: 30,000
Referee: Alexis Ponnet (Belgium)

16 September 1980

Linfield (Northern Ireland)	0–1	(France) Nantes
	Report	Amisse 37'

Haarlem Stadion, Haarlem
Attendance: 940
Referee: Henk van Ettekoven (Netherlands)

17 September 1980

Internazionale (Italy)	2–0	(Romania) Universitatea Craiova
Altobelli 8' (pen.), 60'	Report

San Siro, Milan
Attendance: 63,800
Referee: Bernd Stumpf (East Germany)

17 September 1980

Club Brugge (Belgium)	0–1	(Switzerland) Basel
		Maissen 65'

Olympiastadion, Bruges
Attendance: 21,500
Referee: Adolf Mathias (Austria)

17 September 1980

Viking (Norway)	2–3	(Socialist Federal Republic of Yugoslavia) Red Star Belgrade
Svendsen 30'; Sæbø 50'	Report	Petrović 70'; Brekke 77' (o.g.); Repčić 80'

Stavanger Stadion, Stavanger
Attendance: 7,448
Referee: Arto Ravander (Finland)

=== Second leg ===
1 October 1980

Austria Wien	0–0	(Scotland) Aberdeen
	Report

Praterstadion, Vienna
Attendance: 35,000
Referee: Eldar Azimzade (Soviet Union)

Aberdeen won 1–0 on aggregate.

1 October 1980

Liverpool (England)	10–1	(Finland) OPS
Souness 5', 24', 52' (pen.); McDermott 29', 41', 83'; Lee 53'; Kennedy 66'; Fairclough 68', 81'	Report	Armstrong 47'

Anfield, Liverpool
Attendance: 21,013
Referee: Magnús Pétursson (Iceland)

Liverpool won 11–2 on aggregate.

1 October 1980

Nottingham Forest (England)	0–1	(Bulgaria) CSKA Sofia
	Report	Kerimov 33'

City Ground, Nottingham
Attendance: 25,818
Referee: Walter Horstmann (West Germany)

CSKA Sofia won 2–0 on aggregate.

1 October 1980

Szombierki Bytom (Poland)	3–0	(Turkey) Trabzonspor
Byś 17'; Ogaza 80'; Sroka 89' (pen.)	Report

Stadion Szombierek, Szombierki
Attendance: 9,000
Referee: Erik Fredriksson (Sweden)

Szombierki Bytom won 4–2 on aggregate.

1 October 1980

Bayern Munich (West Germany)	3–0	(Greece) Olympiacos
Hoeneß 2'; Rummenigge 7'; Janzon 68' (pen.)	Report

Olympiastadion, Munich
Attendance: 9,400
Referee: Bob Valentine (Scotland)

Bayern Munich won 7–2 on aggregate.

1 October 1980

Ajax (Netherlands)	1–0	(Albania) Dinamo Tirana
Lerby 80' (pen.)	Report

Olympisch Stadion, Amsterdam
Attendance: 8,100
Referee: Eamonn Farrell (Ireland)

Ajax won 3–0 on aggregate.

1 October 1980

Baník Ostrava (Czechoslovakia)	1–0	(Iceland) ÍBV
Vojáček 31'	Report

Bazaly, Ostrava
Attendance: 9,355
Referee: Edvard Sostarić (Yugoslavia)

Baník Ostrava won 2–1 on aggregate.

1 October 1980

APOEL (Cyprus)	2–1	(East Germany) BFC Dynamo
Hailis 39'; Petrou 48'	Report	Seier 86'

Makario Stadium, Nikosia
Attendance: 4,000
Referee: Milorad Vlajić (Yugoslavia)

BFC Dynamo won 4–2 on aggregate.

1 October 1980

Spartak Moscow (Soviet Union)	4–0	(Luxembourg) Jeunesse Esch
Pigat 15' (o.g.); Rodionov 24'; Gavrilov 40'; Yartsev 88'	Report

Vladimir Lenin Central Stadium, Moscow
Attendance: 8,000
Referee: Carol Jurja (Romania)

Spartak Moscow won 9–0 on aggregate.

1 October 1980

Esbjerg (Denmark)	3–2	(Sweden) Halmstad
Iversen 9'; Lauridsen 24'; Nielsen 49'	Report	Johansson 31'; Larsson 89'

Esbjerg Idrætspark, Esbjerg
Attendance: 6,500
Referee: Marcel Van Langenhove (Belgium)

Esbjerg won 3–2 on aggregate.

1 October 1980

Real Madrid (Spain)	5–1	(Republic of Ireland) Limerick
Santillana 15'; Juanito 31'; De Los Santos 69'; Cunningham 71'; Pineda 83'	Report	Kennedy 43'

Santiago Bernabéu Stadium, Madrid
Attendance: 30,000
Referee: Augusto Marques Pires (Portugal)

Real Madrid won 7–2 on aggregate.

1 October 1980

Budapest Honvéd (Hungary)	1–0	(Portugal) Sporting CP
Dajka 38'	Report

Népstadion, Budapest
Attendance: 7,000
Referee: John Hunting (England)

Budapest Honvéd won 3–0 on aggregate.

1 October 1980

Nantes (France)	2–0	(Northern Ireland) Linfield
Rampillon 17'; Trossero 60'	Report

Stade Marcel Saupin. Nantes
Attendance: 11,080
Referee: Norbert Rolles (Luxembourg)

Nantes won 3–0 on aggregate.

1 October 1980

Universitatea Craiova (Romania)	1–1	(Italy) Internazionale
Beldeanu 18'	Report	Muraro 8'

Stadionul Central, Craiova
Attendance: 35,000
Referee: Talal Tokat (Turkey)

Internazionale won 3–1 on aggregate.

1 October 1980

Basel (Switzerland)	4–1	(Belgium) Club Brugge
Tanner 14'; Stohler 48' (pen.); Von Wartburg 55'; Geisser 81'	Report	Ceulemans 4'

St.-Jakob-Stadion, Basel
Attendance: 22,500
Referee: Ángel Franco Martínez (Spain)

Basel won 5–1 on aggregate.

1 October 1980

Red Star Belgrade (Socialist Federal Republic of Yugoslavia)	4–1	(Norway) Viking
B. Ǵurovski 21'; Janjanin 24'; Petrović 29'; Stamenković 58'	Report	Brekke 58'

Marakana, Belgrade
Attendance: 25,000
Referee: George Chrisanthou (Greece)

Red Star Belgrade won 7–3 on aggregate.

== Second Round ==
Team 1	Agg.	Team 2	1st leg	2nd leg
Aberdeen (Scotland)	0–5	(England) Liverpool	0–1	0–4
CSKA Sofia (Bulgaria)	5–0	(Poland) Szombierki Bytom	4–0	1–0
Bayern Munich (West Germany)	6–3	(Netherlands) Ajax	5–1	1–2
Baník Ostrava (Czechoslovakia)	1–1 (a)	(East Germany) BFC Dynamo	0–0	1–1
Spartak Moscow (Soviet Union)	3–2	(Denmark) Esbjerg	3–0	0–2
Real Madrid (Spain)	3–0	(Hungary) Budapest Honvéd	1–0	2–0
Nantes (France)	2–3	(Italy) Internazionale	1–2	1–1
Basel (Switzerland)	1–2	(Socialist Federal Republic of Yugoslavia) Red Star Belgrade	1–0	0–2

=== First leg ===
22 October 1980

Aberdeen (Scotland)	0–1	(England) Liverpool
	Report	McDermott 5'

Pittodrie Stadium, Aberdeen
Attendance: 24,000
Referee: Alek Jarguz (Poland)

22 October 1980

CSKA Sofia (Bulgaria)	4–0	(Poland) Szombierki Bytom
Yonchev 22', 58', 60'; Zdravkov 75'	Report

Vasil Levski National Stadium, Sofia
Attendance: 12,000
Referee: Valeriy Butenko (Soviet Union)

22 October 1980

Bayern Munich (West Germany)	5–1	(Netherlands) Ajax
Dürnberger 45'; Rummenigge 51', 82'; D. Hoeneß 80', 90'	Report	Arnesen 37'

Olynmpiastadion, Munich
Attendance: 35,000
Referee: Luigi Agnolin (Italy)

22 October 1980

Baník Ostrava (Czechoslovakia)	0–0	(East Germany) BFC Dynamo
	Report

Bazaly, Ostrava
Attendance: 14,537
Referee: Romualdas Yushka (Soviet Union)

22 October 1980

Spartak Moscow (Soviet Union)	3–0	(Denmark) Esbjerg
Khidiyatullin 19', 70'; Shavlo 39'	Report

Vladimir Lenin Central Stadium, Moscow
Attendance: 26,000
Referee: Vasilis Vourakis (Greece)

22 October 1980

Real Madrid (Spain)	1–0	(Hungary) Budapest Honvéd
Santillana 22'	Report

Santiago Bernabeu Stadium, Madrid
Attendance: 25,000
Referee: Eamonn Farrell (Ireland)

22 October 1980

Nantes (France)	1–2	(Italy) Internazionale
Rio 69' (pen.)	Report	Altobelli 12'; Prohaska 85'

Stade Marcel Saupin, Nantes
Attendance: 20,666
Referee: Vojtěch Christov (Czechoslovakia)

22 October 1980

Basel (Switzerland)	1–0	(Socialist Federal Republic of Yugoslavia) Red Star Belgrade
Lauscher 33'	Report

Sankt-Jakob-Stadion, Basel
Attendance: 30,500
Referee: António Garrido (Portugal)

=== Second leg ===
5 November 1980

Liverpool (England)	4–0	(Scotland) Aberdeen
Miller 37' (o.g.); Neal 43'; Dalglish 58'; Hansen 71'	Report

Anfield, Liverpool
Attendance: 36,182
Referee: Adolf Prokop (East Germany)

Liverpool won 5–0 on aggregate.

5 November 1980

Szombierki Bytom (Poland)	0–1	(Bulgaria) CSKA Sofia
	Report	Dzhevizov 53'

Ruch Chorzów Stadium, Chorzów
Attendance: 1,980
Referee: Edvard Sostarić (Yugoslavia)

CSKA Sofia won 5–0 on aggregate.

5 November 1980

Ajax (Netherlands)	2–1	(West Germany) Bayern Munich
Wiggemansen 16'; Rijkaard 18'	Report	Rummenigge 81'

Olympisch Stadion, Amsterdam
Attendance: 12,000
Referee: Erich Linemayr (Austria)

Bayern Munich won 6–3 on aggregate.

5 November 1980

BFC Dynamo (East Germany)	1–1	(Czechoslovakia) Baník Ostrava
Troppa 58' (pen.)	Report	Knapp 33' (pen.)

Friedrich-Ludwig-Jahn-Stadion, East Berlin
Attendance: 18,000
Referee: László Pádár (Hungary)

1–1 on aggregate; Baník Ostrava won on away goals.

5 November 1980

Esbjerg (Denmark)	2–0	(Soviet Union) Spartak Moscow
Lauridsen 47'; Iversen 72'	Report

Esbjerg Idrætspark, Esbjerg
Attendance: 3,100
Referee: Frederick McKnight (Northern Ireland)

Spartak Moscow won 3–2 on aggregate.

4 November 1980

Budapest Honvéd (Hungary)	0–2	(Spain) Real Madrid
	Report	Cunningham 26'; García Hernández 82'

Népstadion, Budapest
Attendance: 15,000
Referee: Jan Redelfs (West Germany)

Real Madrid won 3–0 on aggregate.

5 November 1980

Internazionale (Italy)	1–1	(France) Nantes
Altobelli 29'	Report	Amisse 75'

San Siro, Milan
Attendance: 58,657
Referee: Heinz Aldinger (West Germany)

Internazionale won 3–2 on aggregate.

5 November 1980
17:00

Red Star Belgrade (Socialist Federal Republic of Yugoslavia)	2–0	(Switzerland) Basel
Repčić 6'; Janjanin 18'	Report

Marakana, Belgrade
Attendance: 75,000
Referee: John Carpenter (Ireland)

Red Star Belgrade won 2–1 on aggregate.

== Quarter-finals ==
Team 1	Agg.	Team 2	1st leg	2nd leg
Liverpool (England)	6–1	(Bulgaria) CSKA Sofia	5–1	1–0
Bayern Munich (West Germany)	6–2	(Czechoslovakia) Baník Ostrava	2–0	4–2
Spartak Moscow (Soviet Union)	0–2	(Spain) Real Madrid	0–0	0–2
Internazionale (Italy)	2–1	(Socialist Federal Republic of Yugoslavia) Red Star Belgrade	1–1	1–0

=== First leg ===
4 March 1981

Liverpool (England)	5–1	(Bulgaria) CSKA Sofia
Souness 16', 51', 80'; Lee 45'; McDermott 62'	Report	Yonchev 60'

Anfield, Liverpool
Attendance: 37,255
Referee: Robert Wurtz (France)

4 March 1981

Bayern Munich (West Germany)	2–0	(Czechoslovakia) Baník Ostrava
Janzon 48'; Breitner 89' (pen.)	Report

Olympiastadion, Munich
Attendance: 18,000
Referee: Anders Mattsson (Finland)

4 March 1981

Spartak Moscow (Soviet Union)	0–0	(Spain) Real Madrid
	Report

Vladimir Lenin Stadium, Tbilisi
Attendance: 80,000
Referee: Josef Bucek (Austria)

4 March 1981

Internazionale (Italy)	1–1	(Socialist Federal Republic of Yugoslavia) Red Star Belgrade
Caso 44'	Report	Repčić 75'

San Siro, Milan
Attendance: 73,000
Referee: Károly Palotai (Hungary)

=== Second leg ===
18 March 1981

CSKA Sofia (Bulgaria)	0–1	(England) Liverpool
	Report	Johnson 10'

Vasil Levski National Stadium, Sofia
Attendance: 65,000
Referee: Roger Schoeters (Belgium)

Liverpool won 6–1 on aggregate.

18 March 1981

Baník Ostrava (Czechoslovakia)	2–4	(West Germany) Bayern Munich
Němec 69'; Lička 71'	Report	D. Hoeneß 8'; Kraus 26'; Röber 32'; Dürnberger 38'

Bazaly, Ostrava
Attendance: 32,000
Referee: John Hunting (England)

Bayern Munich won 6–2 on aggregate.

19 March 1981

Real Madrid (Spain)	2–0	(Soviet Union) Spartak Moscow
Isidro 70', 80'	Report

Santiago Bernabéu Stadium, Madrid
Attendance: 80,000
Referee: Gianfranco Menegali (Italy)

Real Madrid won 2–0 on aggregate.

18 March 1981

Red Star Belgrade (Socialist Federal Republic of Yugoslavia)	0–1	(Italy) Internazionale
	Report	Muraro 13'

Marakana, Belgrade
Attendance: 81,369
Referee: Michel Vautrot (France)

Internazionale won 2–1 on aggregate.

== Semi-finals ==
Team 1	Agg.	Team 2	1st leg	2nd leg
Liverpool (England)	1–1 (a)	(West Germany) Bayern Munich	0–0	1–1
Real Madrid (Spain)	2–1	(Italy) Internazionale	2–0	0–1

=== First leg ===
8 April 1981

Liverpool (England)	0–0	(West Germany) Bayern Munich
	Report

Anfield, Liverpool
Attendance: 44,543
Referee: Vojtech Christov (Czechoslovakia)

8 April 1981

Real Madrid (Spain)	2–0	(Italy) Internazionale
Santillana 29'; Juanito 47'	Report

Santiago Bernabéu Stadium, Madrid
Attendance: 80,000
Referee: Charles Corver (Netherlands)

=== Second leg ===
22 April 1981

Bayern Munich (West Germany)	1–1	(England) Liverpool
Rummenigge 88'	Report	R. Kennedy 83'

Olympiastadion, Munich
Attendance: 75,000
Referee: António Garrido (Portugal)

1–1 on aggregate; Liverpool won on away goals.

22 April 1981

Internazionale (Italy)	1–0	(Spain) Real Madrid
Bini 57'	Report

San Siro, Milan
Attendance: 80,000
Referee: Alexis Ponnet (Belgium)

Real Madrid won 2–1 on aggregate.

== Final ==
27 May 1981
20:15 CEST

Real Madrid (Spain)	0–1	(England) Liverpool
	Report	A. Kennedy 82'

Parc des Princes, Paris
Attendance: 48,360
Referee: Károly Palotai (Hungary)

== Top scorers ==
The top scorers from the 1980–81 European Cup (excluding preliminary round) are as follows:

Rank	Name	Team	Goals
1	(England) Terry McDermott	(England) Liverpool	6
1	(Germany) Karl-Heinz Rummenigge	(Germany) Bayern Munich	6
1	(Scotland) Graeme Souness	(England) Liverpool	6
4	(Bulgaria) Tsvetan Yonchev	(Bulgaria) CSKA Sofia	5
5	(Italy) Alessandro Altobelli	(Italy) Internazionale	4
5	(Soviet Union) Yuri Gavrilov	(Soviet Union) Spartak Moscow	4
5	(Germany) Dieter Hoeneß	(Germany) Bayern Munich	4
8	(Spain) Juanito	(Spain) Real Madrid	3
8	(Soviet Union) Vagiz Khidiyatullin	(Soviet Union) Spartak Moscow	3
8	(Socialist Federal Republic of Yugoslavia) Srebrenko Repčić	(Socialist Federal Republic of Yugoslavia) Red Star Belgrade	3
8	(Spain) Santillana	(Spain) Real Madrid	3
8	(Denmark) Frank Arnesen	(Netherlands) AFC Ajax	3

== See also ==
- 1981 Intercontinental Cup
