= Jan Byś =

Polish footballer (1953–2026)

Personal information
- Date of birth: 9 December 1953
- Date of death: 28 October 2026 (aged 72)
- Place of death: Mikulczyce, Zabrze, Poland
- Height: 1.69 m (5 ft 7 in)
- Position: Midfielder

Youth career
- –1974: Górnik Zabrze

Senior career*
Years	Team	Apps	(Gls)
1974–1977	Sparta Zabrze		
1977–1985	Szombierki Bytom	179+	(11+)
- Sparta Zabrze
- * Club domestic league appearances and goals

Jan Byś (9 December 1953 – 28 October 2026) was a Polish footballer who played as a midfielder. He was a key part of the Szombierki Bytom squad that won the 1980 Ekstraklasa title. The following season, he scored the club's first European home goal.

== Career ==
Byś initially played for Górnik Zabrze where he tried to break into the first team.

Byś began his senior career with Sparta Zabrze in the Mikulczyce district of Zabrze before moving to Szombierki Bytom, where he was signed by manager Hubert Kostka who had already spotted Byś at Górnik.

He was a key member of the Szombierki team that unexpectedly won the Ekstraklasa title at the end of the 1980 season, playing in 29 out of 30 league matches that season. Byś played on the right-wing in midfield and formed a reliable and disciplined second line at Szombierki alongside Rudolf Wojtowicz and Paweł Janik. Byś was also noted for fulfilling his defensive duties and particularly effective man-marking, which is why Kostka assigned him to mark stars such as then Widzew player Zbigniew Boniek and Legia's Kazimierz Deyna. Szombierki's league win was all the more unexpected given that in the preceding seasons they were a mid-table team, and even upon winning the title the Upper Silesian press at the time gave more attention to local derby arch-rivals Polonia's relegation, who in Bytom had a greater support whereas the greens were seen as a neighbourhood club representing Szombierki.

Throughout his career in the top flight of Polish football, Byś played 179 league matches and scored 12 goals for Szombry.

The season following the title win he scored the opening goal against Trabzonspor in a 3–0 win in a European Champion Clubs' Cup return leg, for which he was particularly remembered.

In 1984 Szombierki were relegated from the top flight. Byś returned to Sparta and continued playing for them until his retirement.

== Personal life, death and legacy ==
Byś was born on 9 December 1953, and was a native of Zabrze. He died on 28 October 2026, at the age of 72. His funeral was held near his home at the Mikulczyce cemetery in Zabrze.

Journalist Paweł Czado, who spoke to Byś whilst researching Szombierki Bytom's history and unexpected 1980 title win for his book, described him as a charming but exceptionally humble family man who deliberately avoided media attention. Szombierki footballers and former teammates Paweł Janik and Wiesław Surlit also confirmed that even when part of the squad he was very private and avoided gatherings. Surlit described Byś as very likable and formed a good friendship with him.

== Honours ==
Szombierki Bytom

- Ekstraklasa: 1979–80
