= Lička =

Lička is a Czech surname. Notable people with the surname include:

- Marcel Lička (born 1977), Czech footballer and coach
- Mario Lička (born 1982), Czech footballer
- Werner Lička (born 1954), Czech footballer and manager
- Ronald Lička (born 1974), American musical artist and producer
