= Milan Albrecht =

Slovak footballer (born 1950)

Personal information
- Full name: Milan Albrecht
- Date of birth: 16 July 1950 (age 76)
- Place of birth: Trenčín, Czechoslovakia
- Position: Forward

Senior career*
| Years | Team | Apps | (Gls) |
| 1967–1972 | Jednota Trenčín | ? | (26) |
| 1972–1976 | Baník Ostrava | ? | (14) |
| 1976–1978 | Banská Bystrica | ? | (?) |
| 1978–1981 | Baník Ostrava | ? | (13) |
| 1982–1983 | TJ Vítkovice | 44 | (13) |
| 1983–1985 | TTS Trenčín | 48 | (4) |

International career
| 1970 | Czechoslovakia | 5 | (2) |

Managerial career
- ?: Karviná (assistant)
- 2001: Ozeta Trenčín
- 2001: FC Nitra
- 2003: Dunajská Streda
- 2003: Ličartovce
- 2004: HFK Prievidza
- 2005: Nemšová
- 2006: Dunajská Streda
- 2008–2010: Lučenec
- 2010–2012: Zvolen
- * Club domestic league appearances and goals

Milan Albrecht (born 16 July 1950) is a Slovak former footballer who played as a forward.

During his career he played for Jednota Trenčín and Banská Bystrica before finishing with Baník Ostrava and Vítkovice. He earned 5 caps for the Czechoslovakia national football team, scoring 2 goals, and was in the 1970 FIFA World Cup squad, although he did not play at the tournament.

== Honours ==
=== Player ===
Baník Ostrava

- Czechoslovak First League
  - Winners (3): 1975-76, 1979-80, 1980-81

Czechoslovakia

- 1970 FIFA World Cup: Group Stage
