= 1967 UEFA European Under-18 Championship =

Tournament details
- Host country: Turkey
- Dates: 5–13 May
- Teams: 16

Final positions
- Champions: Soviet Union (2nd title)
- Runners-up: England
- Third place: Turkey
- Fourth place: France

Tournament statistics
- Matches played: 28
- Goals scored: 66 (2.36 per match)
- Top scorer(s): (Hungary) Mihály Kozma (Turkey) Nedim Doğan (4 goals each)

The UEFA European Under-18 Championship 1967 Final Tournament was held in Turkey. All matches were played for a total of 80 minutes.

== Qualification ==
Team 1	Agg.	Team 2	1st leg	2nd leg
Bulgaria	5–3	Greece	2–0	3–3
England	1–0	Scotland	1–0	0–0
Netherlands	1–3	West Germany	0–1	1–2
Spain	3–2	Portugal	3–1	0–1
Hungary	5–0	Czechoslovakia	2–0	3–0
France	3–1	Switzerland	1–0	2–1
Yugoslavia	w.o.	Albania		

== Teams ==
The following teams entered the tournament. Seven teams qualified (Q) and nine teams entered without playing qualification matches.

- Austria
- Belgium
- Bulgaria (Q)
- East Germany
- England (Q)
- France (Q)
- West Germany (Q)
- Hungary (Q)
- Italy
- Poland
- Romania
- Soviet Union
- Spain (Q)
- Sweden
- Turkey (host)
- Yugoslavia (Q)

== Group stage ==
=== Group A ===
Teams	Pld	W	D	L	GF	GA	GD	Pts
Turkey	3	2	0	1	5	1	+4	4
Bulgaria	3	2	0	1	5	2	+3	4
Poland	3	2	0	1	5	2	+3	4
Belgium	3	0	0	3	0	10	–10	0

5 May 1967

Bulgaria	2 – 1	Poland
Mihaylov 72'; Vasko Nedelchev 78'	Report	Janik 42'

Atatürk Stadium, Eskişehir
Referee: Günter Männig (East Germany)
5 May 1967

Turkey	4 – 0	Belgium
Doğan 37', 49', 74'; Kurt 73'	Report

Atatürk Stadium, Eskişehir
Referee: Paul Schiller (Austria)
7 May 1967

Bulgaria	3 – 0	Belgium
Totko Dremsizov 15', 21'; Stoyanov 17'

Atatürk Stadium, Eskişehir
Referee: Nicolae Mihăilescu (Romania)
7 May 1967

Poland	1 – 0	Turkey
Białas 2'

Atatürk Stadium, Eskişehir
Referee: Roger Machin (France)
9 May 1967

Turkey	1 – 0	Bulgaria
Doğan 15'

Atatürk Stadium, Eskişehir
Referee: Roger Machin (France)
9 May 1967

Poland	3 – 0	Belgium
Janik 17'; Kasalik 28'; Masztaler 70'

Atatürk Stadium, Eskişehir
Referee: Günter Männig (East Germany)

=== Group B ===
Teams	Pld	W	D	L	GF	GA	GD	Pts
France	3	2	0	1	7	3	+4	4
Hungary	3	2	0	1	6	3	+3	4
West Germany	3	2	0	1	5	3	+2	4
Austria	3	0	0	3	2	11	–9	0

5 May 1967

France	1 – 0	West Germany
Triantafyllos 46'	Report

Mithatpaşa Stadium, Istanbul
Referee: Eric Jennings (England)
5 May 1967

Hungary	3 – 0	Austria
Kozma 5', 84'; Simon 52'	Report

Mithatpaşa Stadium, Istanbul
Referee: Curt Liedberg (Sweden)
7 May 1967

West Germany	2 – 1	Austria
Fuhrmann 31'; Brakelmann 43'		Schlagbauer 58'

Atatürk Stadium, Bursa
Referee: Vlado Tauzes (Yugoslavia)
7 May 1967

Hungary	2 – 0	France
Kozma 32', 67'

Atatürk Stadium, Bursa
Attendance: 16,000
Referee: Todor Bechirov (Bulgaria)
9 May 1967

West Germany	3 – 1	Hungary
Fuhrmann 53'; Schmitt 71' (pen.); Brakelmann 79'		Dávid 18'

Mithatpaşa Stadium, Istanbul
Referee: Curt Liedberg (Sweden)
9 May 1967

France	6 – 1	Austria
Roethlisberger 1'; Eo 20', 35', 78'; Triantafyllos 27', 43'		Schlagbauer 5'

Mithatpaşa Stadium, Istanbul
Referee: Eric Jennings (England)

=== Group C ===
Teams	Pld	W	D	L	GF	GA	GD	Pts
Soviet Union	3	2	1	0	4	1	+3	5
East Germany	3	1	1	1	2	2	0	3
Sweden	3	1	0	2	3	4	–1	2
Romania	3	1	0	2	1	3	–2	2

5 May 1967

Romania	1 – 0	East Germany
Neagu 79'	Report

19 Mayıs Stadium, Ankara
Referee: Tibor Wottava (Hungary)
5 May 1967

Soviet Union	2 – 1	Sweden
Averyanov 28'; Nodia 80'	Report	Almqvist 76'

19 Mayıs Stadium, Ankara
Attendance: 12,000
Referee: Mariano Medina Iglesias (Spain)
7 May 1967

East Germany	0 – 0	Soviet Union

Atatürk Stadium, Bolu
Referee: Franz Geluck (Belgium)
7 May 1967

Sweden	1 – 0	Romania
Kenneth Stenwall 9'

Atatürk Stadium, Konya
Attendance: 7,000
Referee: Mariano Medina Iglesias (Spain)
9 May 1967

East Germany	2 – 1	Sweden
Schellenberg 23'; Schulenberg 62'		Ohlsson 26'

19 Mayıs Stadium, Ankara
Attendance: 16,000
Referee: Franz Geluck (Belgium)
9 May 1967

Soviet Union	2 – 0	Romania
Anatoly Maslyaev 2', 35'

19 Mayıs Stadium, Ankara
Referee: Tibor Wottava (Hungary)

=== Group D ===
Teams	Pld	W	D	L	GF	GA	GD	Pts
England	3	2	1	0	4	2	+2	5
Yugoslavia	3	2	1	0	3	1	+2	5
Italy	3	1	0	2	3	4	–1	2
Spain	3	0	0	3	3	6	–3	0

5 May 1967

Yugoslavia	1 – 0	Spain
Vinko Srok 55'	Report

Alsancak Stadium, İzmir
Referee: Doğan Babacan (Turkey)
5 May 1967

England	1 – 0	Italy
Brooking 25'	Report

Alsancak Stadium, İzmir
Referee: Kurt Handwerker (West Germany)
7 May 1967

England	2 – 1	Spain
Evans 64', 74'		Asensi 56'

7 Eylül Stadium, Manisa
Referee: Tofiq Bahramov (Soviet Union)
7 May 1967

Yugoslavia	1 – 0	Italy
Petrović 64' (pen.)

7 Eylül Stadium, Manisa
Referee: Doğan Babacan (Turkey)
9 May 1967

Italy	3 – 2	Spain
Ventura 25'; Novellini 36', 58'		Asensi 38' (pen.); Planelles 77'

Alsancak Stadium, İzmir
Referee: Kurt Handwerker (West Germany)
9 May 1967

England	1 – 1	Yugoslavia
Kidd 72'		Olarević 42'

Alsancak Stadium, İzmir
Referee: Tofiq Bahramov (Soviet Union)

== Semifinals ==
11 May 1967

Soviet Union	2 – 1	Turkey
Yuriy Patrikeev 24' (pen.); Smolnikov 79'	Report	Göçmen 45'

Mithatpaşa Stadium, Istanbul
Attendance: 43,039
Referee: Mariano Medina Iglesias (Spain)
11 May 1967

England	2 – 0	France
Kidd 62'; Lloyd 77'	Report

Mithatpaşa Stadium, Istanbul
Attendance: 43,039
Referee: Kurt Handwerker (Germany)

== Third place match ==
13 May 1967

Turkey	(c) 1 – 1	France
Tepeçalı 4'	Report	Molitor 27'

Mithatpaşa Stadium, Istanbul
Referee: Nicolae Mihăilescu (Romania)

== Final ==
13 May 1967

Soviet Union	1 – 0	England
Kuznetsov 44'	Report

Mithatpaşa Stadium, Istanbul
Referee: Nejat Şener (Turkey)

1967 UEFA European Under-18 Championship

Soviet Union
Second title
