= Smolnikov =

Smolnikov is a surname. Notable people with the surname include:

- Igor Smolnikov (born 1988), Russian footballer
- Nikolai Smolnikov (born 1949), Soviet Azerbaijani footballer
