= Adam Książek =

Polish footballer (1967–2020)

Personal information
- Date of birth: 6 September 1967
- Place of birth: Bytom, Poland
- Date of death: 31 December 2020 (aged 53)
- Place of death: Münster, Germany
- Height: 1.85 m (6 ft 1 in)
- Position: Defender

Senior career*
Years	Team	Apps	(Gls)
1987–1990	Szombierki Bytom	89	(10)
1990–1992	GKS Katowice	23	(0)
1992–1993	Szombierki Bytom	41	(5)
Total		153	(15)

International career
1987	Poland U20		
- * Club domestic league appearances and goals

Adam Książek (6 September 1967 – 31 December 2020) was a Polish professional footballer who played as a defender. His career is mostly associated with Szombierki Bytom, where is considered one of the club's legends, but has also won the Polish Cup with GKS Katowice in 1991.

== Biography ==
Born on 6 September 1967 in Bytom, he is considered one of local club Szombierki Bytom's legends, having remained in strong contact with the club until his death. He represented Poland in the U20s. He debuted in the top division in 1987 as a Szombierki Bytom player. On the 26 March 1988 he scored for Szombierki the 800th goal in the division. He played for Szombierki until 1990, then moving to GKS Katowice. At "Gieksa", he made 23 appearances in the top division, and in 1991, he won the Polish Cup. He returned to Szombierki in 1992 and played there until the end of 1993. After retirement, he emigrated permanently to Germany, where he lived until his sudden death in a Münster hospital on 31 December 2020.

== Honours ==
GKS Katowice

- Polish Cup: 1990–91
