= Hubert Kostka =

Polish footballer and manager

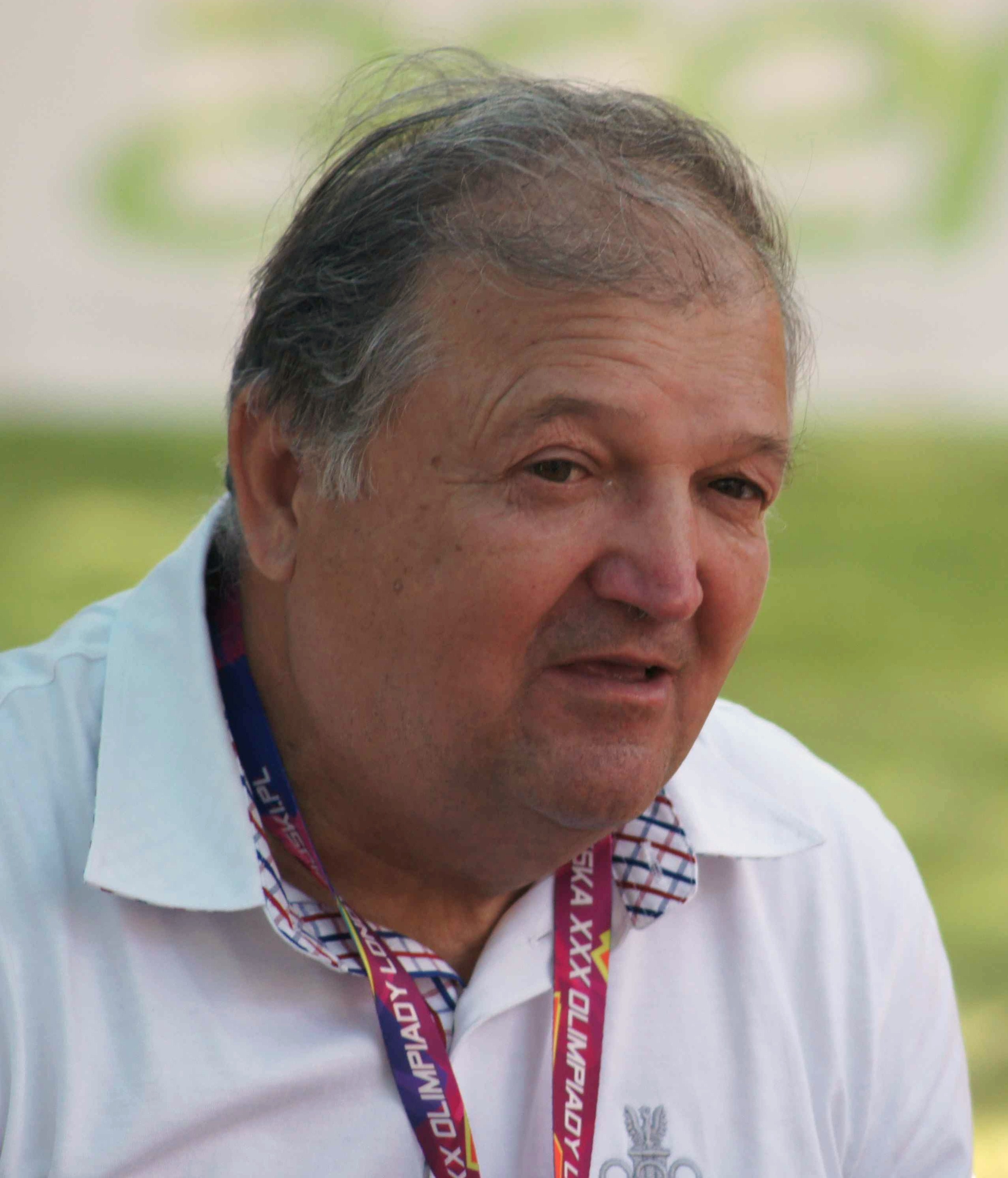

Personal information
- Full name: Hubert Jerzy Kostka
- Date of birth: 27 May 1940 (age 86)
- Place of birth: Racibórz, Poland
- Height: 1.79 m (5 ft 10 in)
- Position: Goalkeeper

Youth career
- 1950–1957: LZS Markowice

Senior career*
Years	Team	Apps	(Gls)
1958–1960	Unia Racibórz		
1960–1973	Górnik Zabrze	219	(0)

International career
1962–1972	Poland	32	(0)

Managerial career
- 1974: Poland (assistant)
- 1974–1976: Górnik Zabrze (youth)
- 1974–1976: Walka Makoszowy
- 1975: Poland (assistant)
- 1976–1977: Górnik Zabrze
- 1978–1983: Szombierki Bytom
- 1978: Poland (assistant)
- 1982: Poland (assistant)
- 1983: Zagłębie Sosnowiec
- 1983–1986: Górnik Zabrze
- 1988: FC Aarau
- 1989: Olimpia Poznań
- 1989–1993: FC Grenchen
- 1994: Górnik Zabrze
- 1995: Petrochemia Płock
- 1995–1996: Lechia/Olimpia Gdańsk
- 1997: Raków Częstochowa
- 2000: Włókniarz Kietrz
Medal record
Men's football
Representing Poland
Olympic Games
Gold medal – first place	1972 Munich	Team
- * Club domestic league appearances and goals

Hubert Jerzy Kostka (born 27 May 1940) is a Polish former footballer who played as a goalkeeper. Kostka participated in the 1972 Summer Olympics in Munich, where Poland won the men's football tournament. Kostka is not only a successful player, he also was a manager, and graduated as a mining engineer from the Silesian Polytechnic in Gliwice.

== Club career ==
His career began at small club LZS Markowice, but soon he was purchased by Unia Racibórz, and in the fall of 1960 he moved to Górnik Zabrze, a powerhouse of Polish football. He spent 14 years at the club, playing 301 games in all competitions. With Kostka in goal, Górnik won eight Ekstraklasa titles, and finished as runners-up in the 1970 Cup Winners' Cup final to Manchester City.

== International career ==
Kostka also was a starting goalkeeper for the Poland national team. In the 1972 Summer Olympics, Kostka won the gold medal in the men's football tournament, but soon afterwards the aging goalkeeper was replaced by another star, Jan Tomaszewski. Between 1962 and 1972, he played in 32 international matches, captaining the team on 4 occasions.

=== International statistics ===
Appearances, conceded goals and clean sheets by national team
National team	Year	Apps	Conceded Goals	Clean Sheets
Poland	1962	2	1	1
Poland	1967	3	6	1
Poland	1968	7	10	3
Poland	1969	6	8	1
Poland	1970	4	6	2
Poland	1972	10	7	5
Total		32	38	13

== Post-playing career ==
After retiring from playing, he started managing. He was the Poland national team assistant in 1974. His first job as the main manager was with Górnik Zabrze Youth. In 1976 he took over as manager of Górnik's first team. Later, he worked with Szombierki Bytom, winning the 1979–80 Ekstraklasa title. In the mid-1980s Kostka returned to Zabrze, winning the Ekstraklasa twice, in 1984–85 and 1985–86. He also helped Kazimierz Górski, Jacek Gmoch and Antoni Piechniczek with preparations for the 1970 FIFA World Cup. He graduated as a mining engineer from the Silesian Polytechnic University in Gliwice.

He continued managing until 2000, when he retired from Włókniarz Kietrz.

== Honours ==
=== Player ===
Górnik Zabrze

- Ekstraklasa: 1961, 1962–63, 1963–64, 1964–65, 1965–66, 1966–67, 1970–71, 1971–72
- Polish Cup: 1964–65, 1967–68, 1968–69, 1969–70, 1970–71, 1971–72

Poland

- Summer Olympic Games gold medal: 1972

Individual

- Ekstraklasa Hall of Fame: 2022

=== Manager ===
Szombierki Bytom

- Ekstraklasa: 1979–80

Górnik Zabrze

- Ekstraklasa: 1984–85, 1985–86

Individual

- Polish Coach of the Year: 1979, 1980, 1985
- Order of Polonia Restituta: 1972
