= Rudolf Wojtowicz =

Polish footballer

Personal information
- Date of birth: 9 June 1956 (age 70)
- Place of birth: Bytom, Poland
- Height: 1.80 m (5 ft 11 in)
- Positions: Defender; midfielder

Senior career*
Years	Team	Apps	(Gls)
1973–1982	Szombierki Bytom	199	(16)
1982–1986	Bayer Leverkusen	76	(2)
1986–1992	Fortuna Düsseldorf	144	(1)
Total		419	(19)

International career
1978	Poland	1	(0)

Managerial career
- 1996–1997: Fortuna Düsseldorf
- * Club domestic league appearances and goals

Rudolf Wojtowicz (born 9 June 1956) is a Polish former professional footballer, who in different periods of his career was a defender or midfielder.

Wojtowicz initially represented Szombierki Bytom, winning the Polish title in 1980. In the early 1980s, he left Poland and settled in Germany. Wojtowicz played for Bayer Leverkusen from 1982 to 1986, as well as Fortuna Düsseldorf, from 1986 to 1992. Between 1996 and 1997, he was the head coach of Fortuna.

Wojtowicz was capped once for Poland, in a game against Ireland on 12 April 1978.

== Honours ==
Szombierki Bytom

- Ekstraklasa: 1979–80
