= Russia national under-19 football team =

National association football team

Russia Under-19
- Nickname(s): Юноши (Boys); Юношеская Сборная (Youth Team)
- Association: Russian Football Union
- Confederation: UEFA (Europe)
- Head coach: Andrei Gordeyev
- FIFA code: RUS
First colours	Second colours

Biggest win
- Russia 7–0 Estonia (Moscow, Russia; 24 September 2007); Russia 7–0 Faroe Islands (Moscow, Russia; 9 October 2014)

Biggest defeat
- Russia 2–6 Serbia (Pasching, Austria; 18 July 2007)

UEFA U-19 Championship
- Appearances: 22 (first in 1962, as Soviet Union)
- Best result: Winners, 1966 (shared), 1967, 1976, 1978, 1988, 1990, as Soviet Union

The Russia national under-19 football team represents the Russian Football Union at the European Under-19 Football Championship and international friendly match fixtures at the under-19 age level.

On 28 February 2022, in accordance with a "recommendation" by the International Olympic Committee (IOC), FIFA and UEFA suspended the participation of Russia, including in the Qatar 2022 World Cup. The Russian Football Union unsuccessfully appealed the FIFA and UEFA bans to the Court of Arbitration for Sport, which upheld the bans.

== History ==
=== European Championships ===
Since the tournament was renamed to under-19 in 2002, the Russia under-19s have qualified for only two UEFA European Under-19 Football Championship. They have, however, reached the second, or elite, qualification stage in all campaigns with the exception of 2002 when they were knocked out at the preliminary qualification stage. They came closest to qualifying for the 2010 competition, when they finished one point behind group winners Italy in the elite qualification stage.

In the 2011 qualification campaign, Russia again narrowly missed out on the finals, finishing second in group five of the elite qualifying stage, having drawn two games and won one against Israel. The group winner was the Czech Republic. The joint top scorers for Russia in the qualification campaign for 2011 were Aleksandr Kozlov and Georgi Nurov, who both scored two goals in three games.

Russia's best performance at the European Championships was in 2015 in Greece. After being qualified to the final tournament for the first time since 2007, team Russia also stood at the top position of Group B of the Group Stage along with Spain. In the semifinals Russia beat hosts Greece 4–0. The team eventually became runners-up, after Spain made two goals to win the trophy.

== UEFA U-19 Championship Record ==
- FIFA considers Russia the direct successor to the Soviet Union, and therefore the inheritor to all its records.

Champions Runners-Up Third Place Fourth Place

Year	Result	GP	W	D	L	GS	GA
(Norway) 2002	First qualifying round						
(Liechtenstein) 2003	Second qualifying round						
(Switzerland) 2004	Second qualifying round						
(Northern Ireland) 2005	Elite round						
(Poland) 2006	Elite round						
(Austria) 2007	Group stage	3	0	1	2	4	9
(Czech Republic) 2008	Elite round						
(Ukraine) 2009	Elite round						
(France) 2010	Elite round						
(Romania) 2011	Elite round						
(Estonia) 2012	Elite round						
(Lithuania) 2013	Elite round						
(Hungary) 2014	Elite round						
(Greece) 2015	Runners-up	5	2	1	2	9	5
(Germany) 2016	Elite round						
(Georgia (country)) 2017	Qualifying round						
(Finland) 2018	Qualifying round						
(Armenia) 2019	Elite round						
(Northern Ireland) ~~2020~~	Cancelled						
(Romania) ~~2021~~	Cancelled						
(Slovakia) 2022	Disqualified						
(Malta) 2023	Suspended						
(Northern Ireland) 2024	Suspended						
(Romania) 2025	Suspended						
(Wales) 2026	Suspended						
(Czech Republic) 2027	Suspended						
Total	2/24	8	2	2	4	13	14

== Honours ==
- UEFA European Under-19 Football Championship (Under-18 before 2002)
  - (gold) Winners (6): 1966 (shared with Italy), 1967, 1976, 1978, 1988, 1990
  - (silver) Runners-up (2): 1984, 2015
- Granatkin Memorial
  - (gold) Winners (20): 1982, 1983, 1985, 1986, 1987, 1988, 1989, 1990, 1991, 2001, 2002, 2004, 2005, 2008, 2009, 2010, 2013, 2015, 2017, 2018
  - (silver) Runners-up (9): 1981, 1984, 1987, 1991, 1992, 2013, 2014, 2016, 2019

== Results and fixtures ==
The following is a list of match results in the last 12 months, as well as any future matches that have been scheduled.

Legend

Win Draw Lose Fixture
