= Paweł Janik =

Polish footballer

Personal information
- Date of birth: 4 April 1949 (age 77)
- Position: Midfielder

Senior career*
Years	Team	Apps	(Gls)
1964–1965	ŁTS Łabędy		
1965–1978	Polonia Bytom	259	(19)
1978–1981	Szombierki Bytom	130	(15)
1981–1982	Blois Football 41		
1983	CS Sedan		
1984–1985	Szombierki Bytom		

International career
1970	Poland	1	(0)
- * Club domestic league appearances and goals

Paweł Janik (born 4 April 1949) is a Polish former footballer who played as a midfielder.

He made a total of 389 Ekstraklasa appearances for two Bytom-based clubs, Polonia and Szombierki.

He earned one cap for the Poland national team in 1970.

== Honours ==
Szombierki Bytom

- Ekstraklasa: 1979–80
