= Lubomír Knapp =

Czech footballer

Personal information
- Date of birth: 19 November 1950 (age 75)
- Place of birth: Prostějov, Czechoslovakia
- Position: Attacking midfielder

Senior career*
Years	Team	Apps	(Gls)
1973–1983	Baník Ostrava	246	(43)
1983	Sigma Olomouc	11	(0)
1983–1985	Frýdek-Místek	41	(6)

International career
1974–1977	Czechoslovakia	10	(0)
- * Club domestic league appearances and goals

Lubomír Knapp (born 19 November 1950) is a Czech retired footballer who played as an attacking midfielder. He spent most of his career representing Czechoslovak club FC Baník Ostrava. Knapp won 3 Czechoslovak First League titles.

== Honours ==
FC Baník Ostrava

- Czechoslovak First League: 1975–76, 1979–80, 1980–81
