= Roman Ogaza =

Polish footballer (1952–2006)

Personal information
- Full name: Roman Grzegorz Ogaza
- Date of birth: 17 November 1952
- Place of birth: Katowice, Poland
- Date of death: 4 March 2006 (aged 53)
- Place of death: Forbach, France
- Position: Striker

Senior career*
Years	Team	Apps	(Gls)
1965–1968	Górnik Lędziny		
1968–1970	Górnik Zabrze		
1970–1975	Szombierki Bytom		
1975–1978	GKS Tychy		
1978–1983	Szombierki Bytom	114	(46)
1983–1984	Lens	63	(15)
1984–1986	Olympique Alès	30	(5)
1986	Francs Borains		
1987–1991	Forbach		
1991	SG Marienau		

International career
1974–1981	Poland	21	(6)
Medal record
Men's football
Representing Poland
Olympic Games
Silver medal – second place	1976 Montréal	Team
- * Club domestic league appearances and goals

Roman Grzegorz Ogaza (17 November 1952 – 4 March 2006) was a Polish footballer who played as a striker.

His first club was Górnik Lędziny (1965–1968). He then represented Górnik Zabrze (1968–1970), Szombierki Bytom (1970–1975 and 1978–1983), French teams such as Lens (1983–1984) and Olympique Alès (1984–1986), Forbach (1987–1991) and SG Marienau (1991) and Belgian Royal Francs Borains (1986).

He clinched Polish championship with Szombierki Bytom in 1980. His debut with the Poland national team was in Port-au-Prince on 13 April 1974 against Haiti. Ogaza's last appearance with the national team was against Portugal on 23 February 1981. Ogaza played 21 matches for the Poland national team, scoring 6 goals. With many great players to choose from, Kazimierz Górski did not pick Ogaza for the 1974 World Cup in West Germany. Two years later, Ogaza was a member of the Poland Olympic team which brought home silver from Montreal in 1976.

Ogaza died in Forbach, near Metz, on 4 March 2006, at the age of 53.

== Honours ==
Górnik Zabrze

- Polish Cup: 1969–70

Szombierki Bytom

- Ekstraklasa: 1979–80

Poland

- Olympic silver medal: 1976
