= Olaf Seier =

German footballer

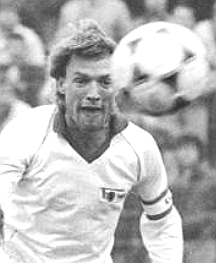
- Seier with Union Berlin in 1989

Personal information
- Date of birth: 25 November 1958 (age 67)
- Place of birth: Rostock, Bezirk Rostock, East Germany
- Height: 1.80 m (5 ft 11 in)
- Position: Midfielder

Youth career
- 1970–1972: SG Dynamo Rostock-Mitte
- 1972–1980: BFC Dynamo

Senior career*
Years	Team	Apps	(Gls)
1979–1983	BFC Dynamo	35	(4)
1983–1991	Union Berlin	196	(40)
1991–1994	Caracas		
1994–1995	1. FC Lübars		
1995–1997	SV Preußen Berlin		
1997–1998	Weißenseer FC		
- * Club domestic league appearances and goals

Olaf Seier (born 25 November 1958) is a German retired football player who became famous as a midfielder for 1. FC Union Berlin during the 1980s.

== Career ==
Olaf Seier, nicknamed "Leo" due to his long lion-like hair, started playing football with the Rostock based sports community SG Dynamo Rostock-Mitte (de) in 1970. He then joined the youth academy of football club BFC Dynamo in 1972, where he went through all age groups. Seier eventually achieved a place in first team of BFC Dynamo and made his first appearance with the first team of BFC Dynamo away against ASG Vorwärt Kemens in the second round of the 1979–80 FDGB-Pokal on 19 October 1979. He then made his debut for BFC Dynamo in the DDR-Oberliga during the second half of the 1979–80 season. Seier would then make his international debut for BFC Dynamo in the 1980–81 European Cup.

Seier had relatives in West Berlin, which would prove problematic for his career. He made several appearances with the first team of BFC Dynamo in the DDR-Oberliga, but would regularly be excluded from international matches. The official explanation for his exclusion was that he was too young and inexperienced. But another possible reason may have been that he was viewed as a risk by sports officials because of his relatives in the West. Seier claims that he had learned from behind the backs that people were afraid that he might defect.

Seier wanted to change club. He came at odds with the sports officials and was eventually threatened with a lifetime ban from playing in the top two tiers by a SED party secretary. With the help of the former BFC Dynamo coach Harry Nippert, he was allowed to change to 1. FC Union Berlin in 1983. Nippert was the coach of Union Berlin in the 1982–83 season. Seier played 35 matches in the DDR-Oberliga and scored four goals in the league until his last season with BFC Dynamo. He also made four appearances for BFC Dynamo in the European Cup. Seier became three times East German champion with BFC Dynamo.

Seier made his debut for Union Berlin in the DDR-Oberliga in 1983. Although he came from the traditional arch-enemy, he slowly became popular among his new fans. Already during his first days with Union Berlin he dominated the way the team played. His first season was marked by bad luck for Union Berlin, and the team was relegated to the DDR-Liga. The team achieved promotion back to the DDR-Oberliga one year later and eventually finished the 1985–86 DDR-Oberliga in 7th place.

Seier went to play for Caracas in Venezuela after German reunification. He returned home and played for the Berlin club 1. FC Lübars at the beginning of the 1994–95 season.
