= Mario Lička =

Czech footballer

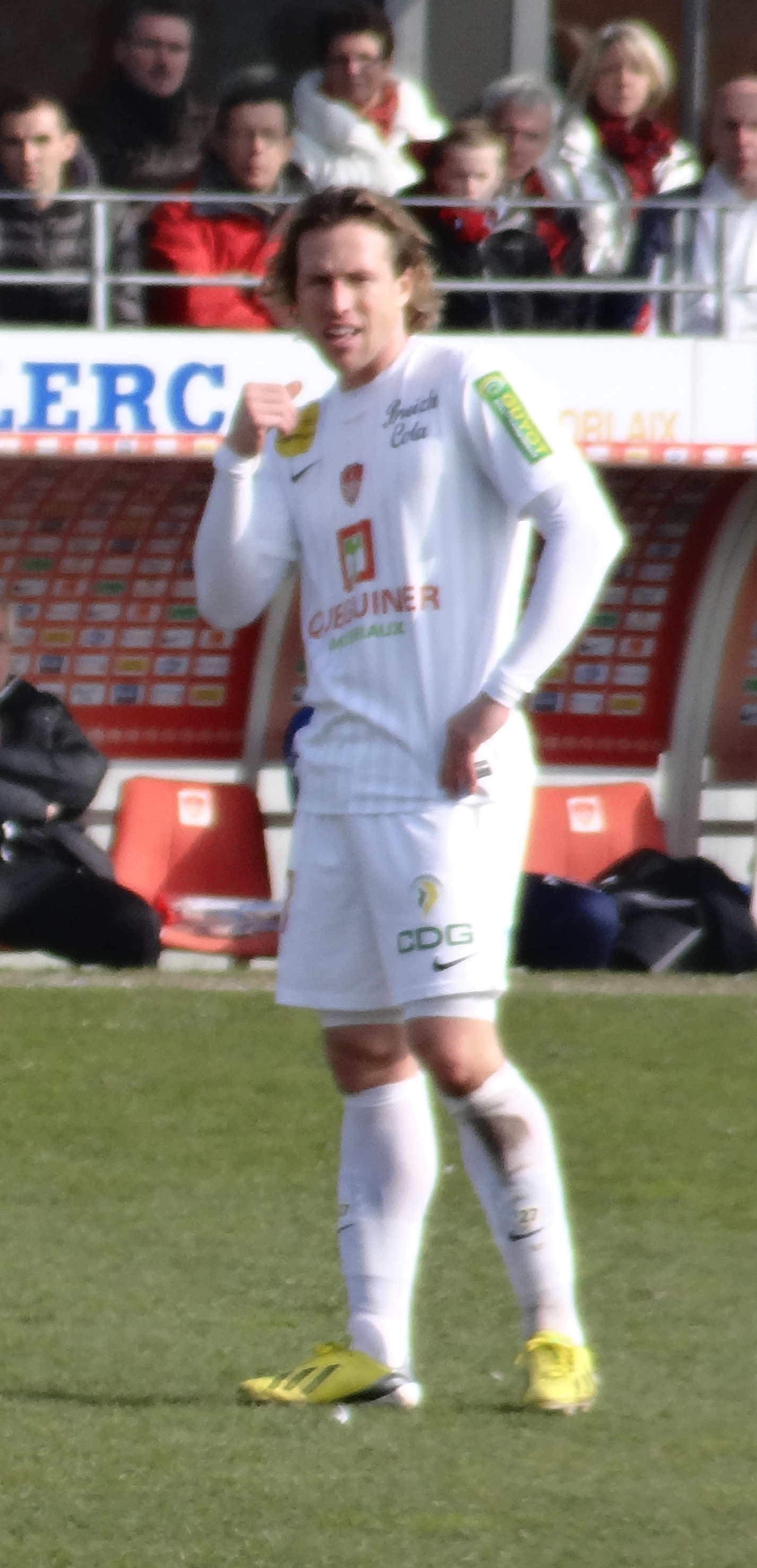

Personal information
- Date of birth: 30 April 1982 (age 44)
- Place of birth: Ostrava, Czechoslovakia
- Height: 1.78 m (5 ft 10 in)
- Position: Midfielder

Youth career
- 1986–1987: FC Grenoble
- 1987–1989: Berchem Sport Antwerpen
- 1988–1990: Calais RUFC
- 1990–1991: FC Grande-Synthe
- 1991–2002: Baník Ostrava

Senior career*
Years	Team	Apps	(Gls)
2002–2005	Baník Ostrava	65	(12)
2004	→ Livorno (loan)	4	(0)
2005–2006	1. FC Slovácko	28	(1)
2006–2008	Southampton	27	(1)
2008–2010	Baník Ostrava	58	(13)
2010–2013	Brest	84	(3)
2013–2014	SK Slavia Prague	13	(0)
2014–2015	FC Istres	28	(0)
2015–2016	Nieciecza	11	(0)
2016	FK Chmel Blšany		
2016–2020	FK Zbuzany 1953		
2020	Sokol Hostouň	1	(0)
2020–2021	SK Benešov	5	(1)

International career
2002–2003	Czech Republic U-21	16	(2)
2009–2010	Czech Republic	3	(0)

Managerial career
- SK Benešov (assistant)
- 2022: Sokol Hostouň (assistant)
- 2022–2023: FC Orenburg (assistant)
- 2023–2025: FC Dynamo Moscow (assistant)
- 2025: Fatih Karagümrük (assistant)
- * Club domestic league appearances and goals

Mario Lička (born 30 April 1982) is a Czech football coach and former player. He works as an assistant coach at FC Dynamo Moscow in Russian Premier League, where his brother Marcel Lička is serving as a manager.

== Career ==
=== Early career ===
Lička began his footballing career at Czech club Baník Ostrava in 2002. He played at Bazaly until January 2005, making sixty-five appearances. Lička was a member of the squad of Baník Ostrava in the 2003–2004 season, when Baník won the league title. He was sold to 1. FC Slovácko where he made 28 league appearances in 2005-06 and was released in July 2006.

=== Southampton ===
He had an unsuccessful trial at West Ham United and Leeds United before signing for Southampton F.C., following another trial. After an injury hit first couple of months at the club, Lička forced his way into manager George Burley's plans, scoring his first goal for the club in a 1–0 win over Stoke City on 21 October 2006. However, not long after he became surplus to Burley's requirements and found himself playing in the reserves. After the appointment of new manager Nigel Pearson in February 2008, Licka was given a new chance and after a series of good performances found himself playing regularly again. However, after the return of former Chairman Rupert Lowe, Pearson did not have his short-term contract renewed despite saving the club from relegation. Lowe did not offer Lička a new contract as he was also at the end of his contract.

=== Later career ===
Despite reported interest from Pearson at his new managerial post at Leicester City, Lička chose to return to his homeland to play for Baník Ostrava. In June 2010 he signed for the French club Stade Brestois for three seasons. Lička subsequently played for Slavia Prague.

== Coaching career ==
Lička served as an assistant in SK Benešov and Sokol Hostouň.

In 2022, he joined his brother Marcel as an assistant coach at FC Orenburg. In June 2023, he followed Marcel to FC Dynamo Moscow. In April 2025, he was released from the club alongside his brother.

== Personal life ==
His father Verner Lička was a very successful footballer, then manager. His brother Marcel is also a footballer, then manager.
