= Slobodan Petrović (footballer) =

Serbian footballer

Personal information
- Date of birth: 2 October 1948 (age 78)
- Place of birth: Belgrade, FPR Yugoslavia
- Position: Midfielder

Youth career
- Partizan

Senior career*
Years	Team	Apps	(Gls)
1966–1972	Partizan	98	(10)
1972–1978	1. FC Nürnberg	185	(23)
- * Club domestic league appearances and goals

Slobodan Petrović (Serbian Cyrillic: Слободан Петровић; born 2 October 1948) is a Serbian former professional footballer who played as a midfielder.

He was also known as Dane Petrović.

== Biography ==
Petrović was born in Belgrade on 2 October 1948. He became a member of the pioneer team of Partizan at the age of six where he was coached by Florijan Matekalo. He has a brother, Miodrag, who also played for Partizan. At the age of seventeen, he made his debut for the first team of Partizan against Radnički in Niš. He played a total of 209 matches for the club. He continued his career in 1. FC Nürnberg, for which he played about 400 matches overall in seven seasons and was the first foreign captain of a German team.

After the end of his playing career, he went into business and owns and operates a chicken farm.
