= Willy Geurts =

Belgian footballer (born 1954)

Personal information
- Date of birth: 30 January 1954 (age 72)
- Position: Forward

Senior career*
Years	Team	Apps	(Gls)
1974–1975	Hoeselt VV		
1975–1976	K.S.C. Hasselt		
1976–1980	Antwerp		
1980–1982	Anderlecht		
1982–1983	Standard Liège		
1983–1984	K.F.C. Winterslag		
1984–1986	RFC Liège		
1986–1987	FC Assent		
1988–1989	K.F.C. Diest		
1989–1991	Prayon FC		

International career
1978–1982	Belgium	6	(1)
- * Club domestic league appearances and goals

Willy Geurts (born 30 January 1954) is a Belgian former footballer who played as a forward. He made six appearances for the Belgium national team from 1978 to 1982.
