= Marcel Lička =

Czech footballer, coach, and manager

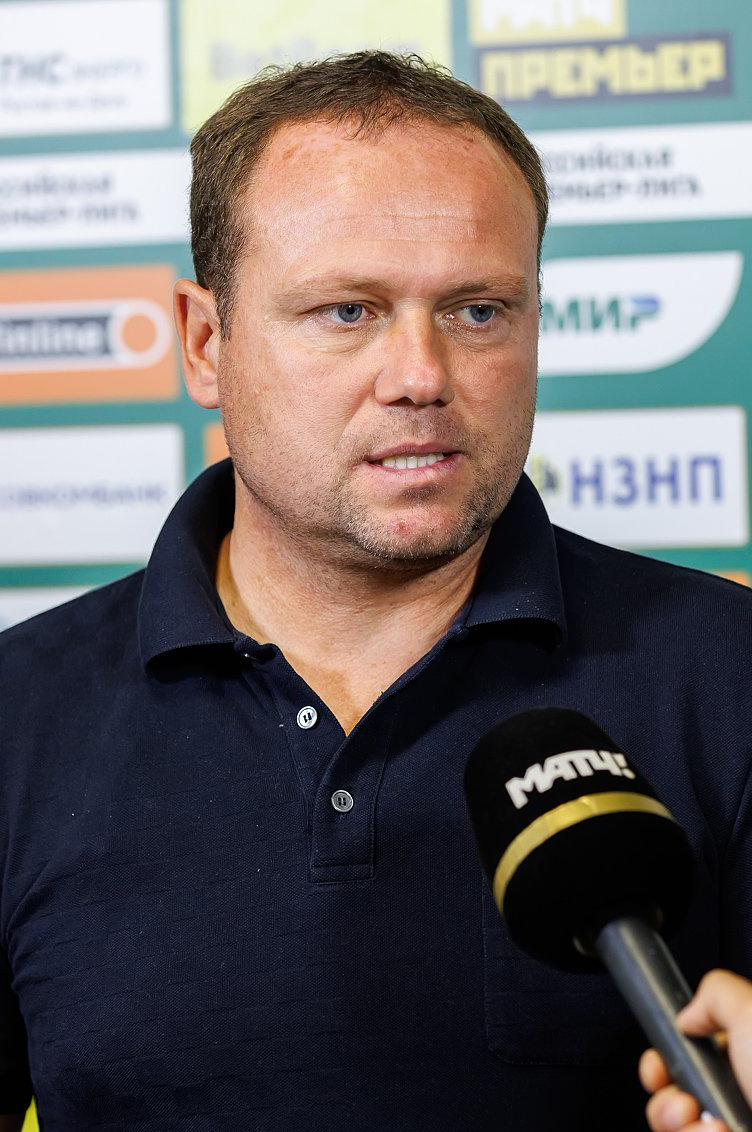
- Lička in 2022

Personal information
- Date of birth: 17 July 1977 (age 49)
- Place of birth: Ostrava, Czechoslovakia
- Height: 1.74 m (5 ft 9 in)
- Position: Midfielder

Youth career
- Grenoble
- K. Berchem Sport
- Calais
- Olympique Grande-Synthe
- Dukla Hranice

Senior career*
Years	Team	Apps	(Gls)
1997–2001	Baník Ostrava	86	(13)
2001–2003	Slavia Prague	14	(0)
2002	→ Chmel Blšany (loan)	9	(1)
2002–2003	→ Viktoria Žižkov (loan)	24	(4)
2003–2004	Tescoma Zlín	19	(0)
2004–2006	Górnik Zabrze	28	(5)
2006	Dyskobolia Grodzisk Wielkopolski	2	(0)
2006–2008	Horadada	72	(14)
2008–2009	Calais	7	(0)
2010	Kladno	12	(1)
Total		273	(38)

International career
1997–1999	Czech Republic U21	12	(0)

Managerial career
- 2015–2016: Chmel Blšany
- 2018–2019: Dynamo Brest
- 2020–2023: Orenburg
- 2023–2025: Dynamo Moscow
- 2025: Fatih Karagümrük
- * Club domestic league appearances and goals

Marcel Lička (born 17 July 1977) is a Czech professional football manager and former player. He was last the manager of Fatih Karagümrük.

== Playing career ==
He made over 171 appearances in the Czech First League and 37 appearances in Polish League. Lička played international football at under-21 level for Czech Republic U21.

== Coaching career ==
Lička was hired by Russian club Orenburg in August 2020.

On 28 May 2022, under Lička's management, Orenburg was promoted into the Russian Premier League.

On 22 June 2023, Lička signed a contract with Dynamo Moscow for the 2023–24 season, with options to extend for the 2024–25 and 2025–26 seasons, based on performance. Dynamo led the league before the last game of the 2023–24 season, but lost that game and dropped to 3rd place. Nevertheless, Lička was named coach of the season by the league. On 1 May 2025, Lička was sacked four matches before the end of the season with the team in 5th place, 11 points behind leaders Krasnodar.

On 1 July 2025, Lička signed a two-year contract with Turkish club Fatih Karagümrük. Lička was sacked in the second half of October after series of poor results.

== Personal life ==
His father Verner Lička and brother Mario are both former international footballers.

== Managerial statistics ==
As of 9 November 2025

Managerial record by team and tenure
Team	From	To	Record					Ref.
Team	From	To	P	W	D	L	Win %	Ref.
Dynamo Brest	12 August 2018	30 December 2018	15	9	2	4	60.00	
Dynamo Brest	31 December 2018	9 December 2019	33	26	6	1	78.79	
Orenburg	28 August 2020	30 June 2023	117	67	19	31	57.26	
Dynamo Moscow	1 July 2023	1 May 2025	78	40	17	21	51.28	
Fatih Karagümrük	1 July 2025	Present	12	2	1	9	16.67	
Total			255	144	45	66	56.47	

== Honours ==
=== Player ===
Slavia Prague

- Czech Cup: 2001–02

=== Manager ===
Dinamo Brest

- Belarusian Premier League: 2019
- Belarusian Super Cup: 2019

Individual

- Russian Premier League Manager of the Season: 2023–24
