= Hubert Meunier =

Luxembourgish footballer

Personal information
- Date of birth: 14 December 1959 (age 66)
- Position: Defender

Senior career*
Years	Team	Apps	(Gls)
1975–1982	Progrès Niederkorn		
1982–1985	Jeunesse Esch		
1985–1989	Avenir Beggen		
1989–1991	Progrès Niederkorn		

International career
1978–1989	Luxembourg	53	(0)
- * Club domestic league appearances and goals

Hubert Meunier (born 14 December 1959) is a retired Luxembourgish football defender.
