= Zbigniew Mikołajów =

Polish footballer (1953–2025)

Personal information
- Date of birth: 11 February 1953
- Place of birth: Klimontów, Sosnowiec, Poland
- Date of death: 20 December 2025 (aged 72)
- Place of death: Sosnowiec, Poland
- Height: 1.84 m (6 ft 0 in)
- Position: Forward

Youth career
- –1974: Górnik Klimontów

Senior career*
| Years | Team | Apps | (Gls) |
| 1974–1976 | Zagłębie Sosnowiec | | |
| 1977–1979 | Niwka Sosnowiec | | |
| 1979–1981 | Zagłębie Sosnowiec | | |
| 1982–1989 | Niwka Sosnowiec | | |

International career
| 1980 | Poland | 3 | (0) |
- * Club domestic league appearances and goals

Zbigniew Mikołajów (11 February 1953 – 20 December 2025) was a Polish footballer who played as a forward. Mikołajów made three appearances for the Poland national team in 1980. He died in Sosnowiec on 20 December 2025, at the age of 72.
