= Verner Lička =

Czech footballer and manager

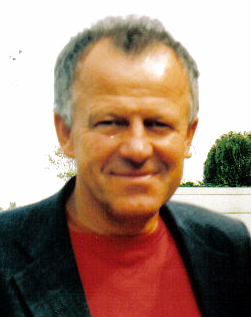

Personal information
- Date of birth: 15 September 1954 (age 72)
- Place of birth: Hlučín, Czechoslovakia
- Position: Striker

Youth career
- 1965–1972: Sokol Hlučín

Senior career*
Years	Team	Apps	(Gls)
1973–1974	Ostroj Opava		
1974–1975	Dukla Tachov		
1975	Ostroj Opava		
1976–1986	Baník Ostrava	260	(103)
1986–1987	Grenoble		
1987–1989	Berchem Sport		
1989	Germinal Ekeren		
1989–1991	Calais		
1991–1992	Olympique Grande–Synthe		

International career
1980–1981	Czechoslovakia	9	(1)

Managerial career
- 1993–1995: Baník Ostrava
- 1995–1996: FC Zlín
- 1997–2000: Baník Ostrava
- 2000–2001: Qatar SC
- 2000–2001: Baník Ostrava (caretaker)
- 2001–2002: Polonia Warsaw
- 2004: Górnik Zabrze
- 2004–2005: Wisła Kraków
- 2005–2006: Dyskobolia Grodzisk Wielkopolski
- 2009: Baník Ostrava (caretaker)
- 2010: Baník Ostrava (caretaker)
- 2016–2017: Radomiak Radom
Medal record
Representing Czechoslovakia
Men's football
Olympic Games
Gold medal – first place	1980 Moscow	Team
- * Club domestic league appearances and goals

Verner Lička (Czech pronunciation: [ˈvɛrnɛr ˈlitʃka]; often written as Werner) (born 15 September 1954) is a Czech professional football manager and former player. He played for Czechoslovakia, for which he played 9 matches and scored 1 goal.

== Career ==
In his country, he played for Baník Ostrava. At the end of his career he played abroad for clubs including FC Grenoble and Germinal Ekeren.

== Personal life ==
Lička is of German ancestry. He has two football playing sons Mario and Marcel.

=== International goals ===
Scores and results list. Czechoslovakia's goal tally first.

#	Date	Venue	Opponent	Score	Result	Competition
1.	9 September 1981	Stadion Evžena Rošického, Strahov	Wales	2–0	2–0	1982 FIFA World Cup Qualifying

== Honours ==
=== Player ===
Baník Ostrava

- Czechoslovak First League: 1975–76, 1979–80, 1980–81
- Czechoslovak Cup: 1977–78

Czechoslovakia

- Olympic Games gold medal: 1980

Individual

- Czechoslovak First League top scorer: 1979–80, 1983–84

=== Manager ===
Wisła Kraków

- Ekstraklasa: 2004–05
