= Nikolai Smolnikov =

Soviet Azerbaijani footballer (born 1949)

Personal information
- Full name: Nikolai Fyodorovich Smolnikov
- Date of birth: 10 March 1949 (age 77)
- Place of birth: Baku, USSR
- Position: Striker

Senior career*
Years	Team	Apps	(Gls)
1967–1979	Neftchi Baku	338	(80)

International career
1968	USSR	3	(0)
- * Club domestic league appearances and goals

Nikolai Fyodorovich Smolnikov (Russian: Николай Фёдорович Смольников; born 10 March 1949) is a former Soviet Azerbaijani footballer.

== International career ==
Smolnikov made his debut for USSR on 3 March 1968 in a friendly against Mexico and played his only two other national team games in the following week in two more friendlies against Mexico. He was selected for the UEFA Euro 1968 squad, but did not play in any games at the tournament.
