= 1979–80 Czechoslovak First League =

Czechoslovak First League
- Season: 1979–80
- Champions: Baník Ostrava
- Relegated: Jednota Trenčín; Škoda Plzeň
- European Cup: Baník Ostrava
- Cup Winners' Cup: Sparta Prague
- UEFA Cup: Zbrojovka Brno; Bohemians Prague
- Top goalscorer: Werner Lička (18 goals)

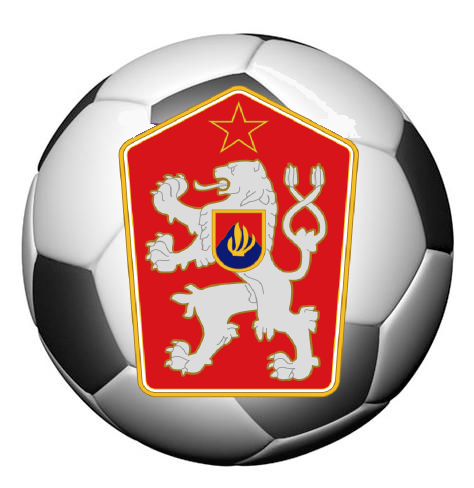
Czechoslovak football, 1960-90

Statistics of Czechoslovak First League in the 1979–80 season.

== Overview ==
It was contested by 16 teams, and FC Baník Ostrava won the championship. Werner Lička was the league's top scorer with 18 goals.

== Stadia and locations ==
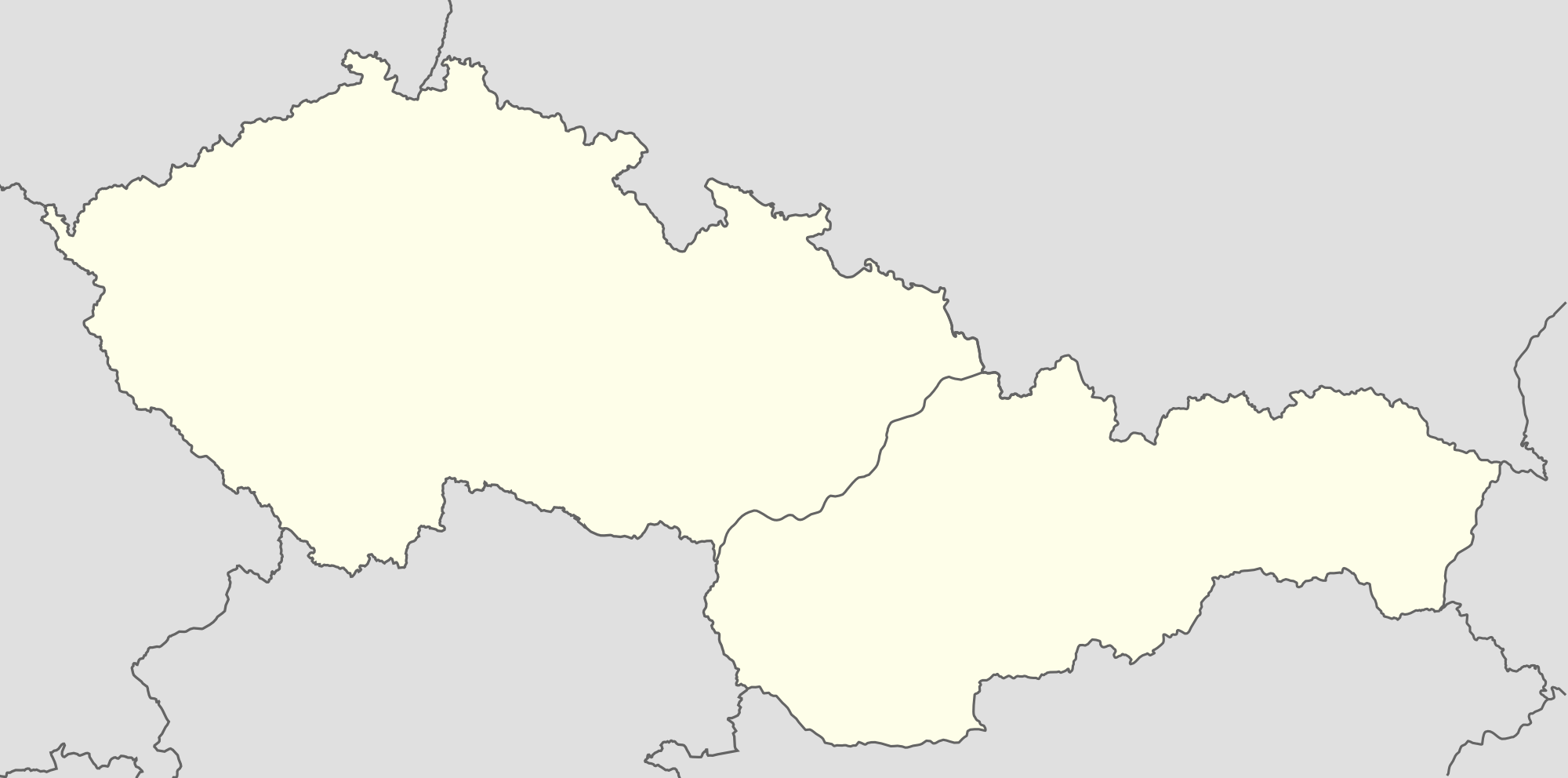
Location of clubs in the 1979–80 Czechoslovak First League

== League standings ==
Pos	Team	Pld	W	D	L	GF	GA	GD	Pts	Qualification or relegation
1	Baník Ostrava (C)	30	16	9	5	47	23	+24	41	Qualification for European Cup first round
2	Zbrojovka Brno	30	15	6	9	59	39	+20	36	Qualification for UEFA Cup first round
3	Bohemians Prague	30	13	8	9	35	35	0	34	Qualification for UEFA Cup first round
4	Dukla Prague	30	15	3	12	53	25	+28	33	
5	Inter Bratislava	30	12	9	9	33	23	+10	33	
6	Plastika Nitra	30	14	4	12	50	46	+4	32	
7	Spartak Trnava	30	11	10	9	35	35	0	32	
8	Lokomotíva Košice	30	12	7	11	40	32	+8	31	
9	Slavia Prague	30	12	6	12	43	42	+1	30	
10	Sparta Prague	30	10	10	10	39	42	−3	30	Qualification for Cup Winners' Cup first round
11	Slovan Bratislava	30	11	7	12	31	35	−4	29	
12	RH Cheb	30	9	10	11	36	43	−7	28	
13	Košice	30	11	4	15	35	42	−7	26	
14	Dukla Banská Bystrica	30	11	4	15	30	50	−20	26	
15	Jednota Trenčín (R)	30	8	4	18	27	63	−36	20	Relegation to Slovak National Football League
16	Škoda Plzeň (R)	30	5	9	16	25	43	−18	19	Relegation to Czech National Football League

Source: rsssf.com
(C) Champions; (R) Relegated

== Results ==
Home \ Away	OST	BOH	BB	DUK	INT	TRE	KOŠ	LOK	NIT	CHE	PLZ	SLA	SLO	SPA	TRN	BRN
Baník Ostrava		1–1	1–0	2–0	1–0	3–0	2–0	3–2	3–0	5–0	2–1	2–0	3–1	1–0	4–1	3–0
Bohemians Prague	3–1		2–1	1–0	0–0	5–1	2–1	2–1	2–1	0–3	1–2	2–3	2–1	0–0	1–0	2–0
Dukla Banská Bystrica	0–1	3–1		1–0	1–0	0–0	3–1	2–0	2–1	1–0	1–0	2–0	0–2	2–0	1–1	2–1
Dukla Prague	1–2	4–0	7–0		0–1	3–0	3–0	2–1	5–0	5–0	1–0	1–1	0–1	3–0	3–1	0–1
Inter Bratislava	3–3	1–0	5–0	0–3		2–0	3–0	0–0	2–0	0–0	1–0	1–0	0–0	3–1	0–0	4–2
Jednota Trenčín	1–0	0–0	2–1	0–2	1–2		1–0	2–1	1–4	3–0	1–1	2–1	2–1	0–2	1–5	1–1
Košice	2–1	0–0	3–1	1–0	3–1	2–1		1–1	3–0	0–0	1–0	2–3	3–0	3–0	4–0	1–0
Lokomotiva Košice	0–0	1–2	2–0	1–0	1–0	3–0	0–0		4–2	2–0	1–0	1–0	2–0	5–3	1–1	2–1
Plastika Nitra	0–0	3–0	3–0	3–1	2–1	4–1	3–0	0–3		0–0	4–0	2–0	1–0	1–1	2–2	2–1
RH Cheb	0–0	0–0	2–2	0–1	1–0	2–1	4–0	1–1	1–4		4–1	5–2	3–1	2–2	1–1	2–1
Škoda Plzeň	1–1	0–1	2–0	3–4	0–0	0–1	1–0	2–1	0–2	2–0		1–1	0–0	0–3	2–2	1–2
Slavia Prague	3–1	1–2	3–0	1–1	2–1	3–1	3–1	1–0	4–1	2–1	3–1		1–1	1–1	2–1	2–2
Slovan Bratislava	2–0	1–0	1–0	1–1	0–2	3–0	3–0	2–0	2–3	1–0	2–2	1–0		0–2	1–0	2–2
Sparta Prag	1–1	2–2	1–1	0–1	0–0	5–2	2–1	1–1	2–1	0–1	2–2	1–0	1–0		1–0	4–3
Spartak Trnava	0–0	2–0	3–2	1–0	0–0	2–0	1–0	2–1	2–1	1–1	1–0	1–0	1–1	2–0		1–3
Zbrojovka Brno	0–0	1–1	5–1	2–1	2–0	5–1	3–2	2–1	3–0	4–2	0–0	3–0	4–0	3–1	2–0	

Source: statistiky1ligy.fotbal.cz
Legend: Blue = home team win; Yellow = draw; Red = away team win.

== Attendances ==
#	Club	Average	Highest
1	Brno	13,453	21,151
2	Sparta Praha	10,890	21,310
3	Cheb	9,526	13,236
4	Ostrava	9,234	20,845
5	Nitra	8,220	13,270
6	Bohemians	7,750	13,862
7	Slavia Praha	6,730	15,391
8	Spartak Trnava	5,316	8,677
9	Slovan	4,968	12,918
10	Dukla Praha	4,465	21,310
11	Trenčín	4,073	8,936
12	Viktoria Plzeň	3,918	10,232
13	Lokomotíva Košice	3,906	6,851
14	Inter Bratislava	3,419	10,535
15	Dukla Banská Bystrica	3,164	5,652
16	ZŤS	2,999	8,221
