= 1980–81 Czechoslovak First League =

Czechoslovak First League
- Season: 1980–81
- Champions: Baník Ostrava
- Relegated: Spartak Hradec Králové; ZŤS Košice
- European Cup: Baník Ostrava
- Cup Winners' Cup: Dukla Prague
- UEFA Cup: Bohemians Prague; Sparta Prague
- Top goalscorer: Marián Masný (16 goals)

Statistics of Czechoslovak First League in the 1980–81 season.

== Overview ==
It was contested by 16 teams, and FC Baník Ostrava won the championship. Marián Masný was the league's top scorer with 16 goals.

== Stadia and locations ==
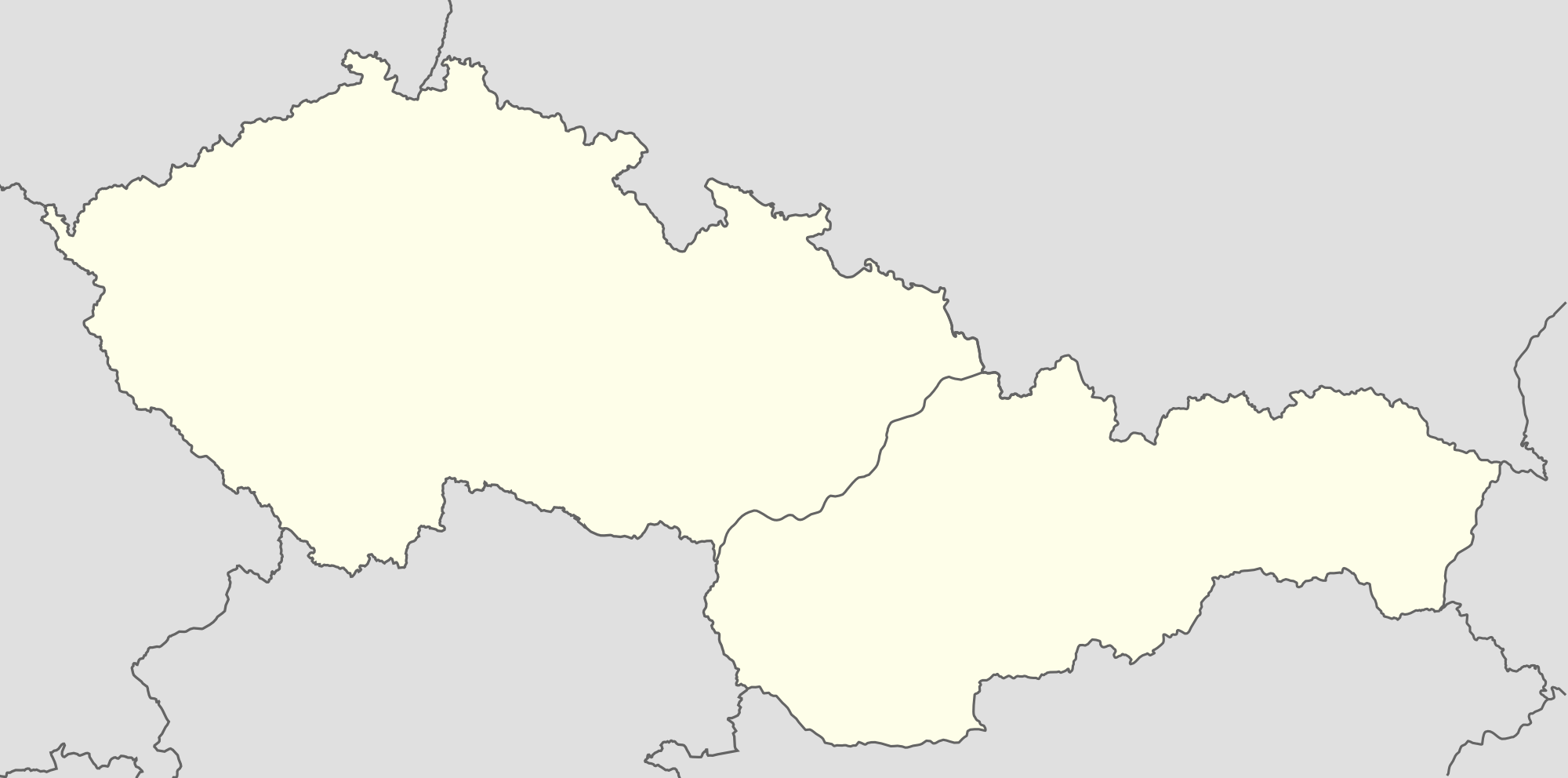
Location of clubs in the 1980–81 Czechoslovak First League

== League standings ==
Pos	Team	Pld	W	D	L	GF	GA	GD	Pts	Qualification or relegation
1	Baník Ostrava (C)	30	18	4	8	44	19	+25	40	Qualification for European Cup first round
2	Dukla Prague	30	16	6	8	51	30	+21	38	Qualification for Cup Winners' Cup first round
3	Bohemians Prague	30	16	4	10	54	30	+24	36	Qualification for UEFA Cup first round
4	Sparta Prague	30	15	6	9	40	26	+14	36	Qualification for UEFA Cup first round
5	Lokomotíva Košice	30	11	10	9	43	34	+9	32	
6	RH Cheb	30	12	8	10	41	36	+5	32	
7	Slavia Prague	30	13	6	11	40	48	−8	32	
8	Tatran Prešov	30	12	5	13	47	44	+3	29	
9	Slovan Bratislava	30	12	5	13	40	38	+2	29	
10	Spartak Trnava	30	13	3	14	36	43	−7	29	
11	Inter Bratislava	30	12	5	13	34	52	−18	29	
12	Zbrojovka Brno	30	10	8	12	42	45	−3	28	
13	Plastika Nitra	30	11	4	15	31	49	−18	26	
14	Dukla Banská Bystrica	30	10	5	15	31	43	−12	25	
15	Spartak Hradec Králové (R)	30	10	5	15	31	43	−12	25	Relegation to Czech National Football League
16	Košice (R)	30	5	4	21	29	54	−25	14	Relegation to Slovak National Football League

Source: rsssf.com
(C) Champions; (R) Relegated

== Results ==
Home \ Away	OST	BOH	BB	DUK	INT	KOŠ	LOK	NIT	CHE	SLA	SLO	SPA	HRK	TRN	PRE	BRN
Baník Ostrava		1–0	1–0	0–0	2–0	4–0	4–0	4–0	1–0	5–0	3–0	2–1	1–0	2–0	3–1	2–0
Bohemians Prague	4–1		3–0	3–2	9–1	4–1	3–0	1–0	3–1	1–1	3–0	2–1	2–1	3–0	1–0	2–0
Dukla Banská Bystrica	1–0	3–1		1–1	0–1	1–0	2–0	1–2	0–0	3–0	0–0	0–1	3–1	2–0	2–1	1–0
Dukla Prague	4–1	1–2	3–2		1–1	4–1	0–0	2–0	2–1	5–2	1–0	1–0	2–0	3–0	3–0	2–0
Inter Bratislava	1–0	1–0	3–1	0–2		2–0	2–0	3–5	1–0	1–0	3–1	0–0	1–2	2–1	2–2	2–2
Košice	0–1	2–0	3–1	1–2	2–1		1–3	5–1	2–1	0–0	0–2	0–1	0–0	2–5	0–1	1–2
Lokomotiva Košice	0–1	0–0	3–0	1–1	4–0	3–1		4–0	0–0	0–2	1–0	3–1	2–0	5–3	2–3	0–0
Plastika Nitra	0–1	1–0	2–0	1–2	2–0	3–1	1–1		0–2	0–1	1–1	2–1	3–1	1–0	0–0	2–0
RH Cheb	1–0	0–0	4–0	2–1	1–0	2–2	1–3	1–0		3–1	2–1	0–0	1–1	3–2	2–1	2–1
Slavia Prague	1–1	3–2	4–2	1–3	0–2	3–2	2–2	1–0	1–1		1–0	0–1	2–1	4–1	4–1	1–0
Slovan Bratislava	2–1	2–1	2–0	3–1	0–0	1–0	2–2	1–1	2–1	4–1		3–0	3–1	1–2	0–1	1–0
Sparta Prague	0–0	0–0	1–0	1–0	4–2	2–1	1–0	4–1	3–2	1–2	1–0		3–0	3–0	4–0	3–1
Spartak Hradec Králové	1–0	2–3	3–3	1–0	0–1	1–0	0–0	1–0	1–0	3–0	1–4	0–0		0–2	2–0	4–1
Spartak Trnava	0–0	1–0	2–0	2–1	2–0	1–0	1–3	0–2	0–0	0–1	3–1	1–0	1–0		1–0	4–0
Tatran Prešov	0–1	2–0	0–1	2–0	4–1	1–1	2–1	4–0	3–6	1–1	3–1	1–0	1–2	4–1		6–0
Zbrojovka Brno	2–1	2–1	1–1	1–1	5–0	1–0	0–0	6–0	4–1	2–0	3–2	2–2	4–1	0–0	2–2	

Source: statistiky1ligy.fotbal.cz
Legend: Blue = home team win; Yellow = draw; Red = away team win.

== Attendances ==
No.	Club	Average	Change	Highest
1	Sparta Praha	14,722	35,2%	27,692
2	Zbrojovka Brno	12,161	-9,6%	25,700
3	Spartak Hradec Králové	9,281	166,5%	17,215
4	Baník Ostrava	8,948	-3,1%	17,393
5	RH Cheb	7,664	-19,5%	9,852
6	Bohemians Praha	7,364	-5,0%	14,800
7	Slavia Praha	6,598	-2,0%	14,627
8	Spartak Trnava	4,611	-13,3%	8,173
9	Plastika Nitra	4,466	-45,7%	8,875
10	Slovan Bratislava	4,063	-18,2%	6,499
11	Dukla Praha	3,777	-15,4%	17,489
12	Lokomotíva Košice	3,592	-8,0%	10,203
13	Tatran Prešov	3,428	-	7,322
14	Dukla Banská Bystrica	3,010	-4,9%	6,250
15	Inter Bratislava	2,564	-25,0%	6,591
16	ZŤS	1,744	-41,9%	4,829
