= 1979–80 Ekstraklasa =

54th season of top-tier football league in Poland

Liga
- Season: 1979–80
- Champions: Szombierki Bytom (1st title)
- Relegated: GKS Katowice; Polonia Bytom
- Matches: 240
- Goals: 587 (2.45 per match)
- Top goalscorer: Kazimierz Kmiecik (24 goals)
- Average attendance: 11,082 ▲2.3%

Statistics for the 1979–80 season of the Ekstraklasa (the top tier of association football in Poland).

== Overview ==
It was contested by 16 teams, and Szombierki Bytom won the championship.

== League table ==
Pos	Team	Pld	W	D	L	GF	GA	GD	Pts	Qualification or relegation
1	Szombierki Bytom (C)	30	16	7	7	42	26	+16	39	Qualification to European Cup first round
2	Widzew Łódź	30	13	10	7	47	39	+8	36	Qualification to UEFA Cup first round
3	Legia Warsaw	30	14	8	8	38	31	+7	36	Qualification to Cup Winners' Cup first round
4	Śląsk Wrocław	30	15	6	9	40	34	+6	36	Qualification to UEFA Cup first round
5	Wisła Kraków	30	15	4	11	58	37	+21	34	
6	Górnik Zabrze	30	10	12	8	36	38	−2	32	
7	ŁKS Łódź	30	11	10	9	38	40	−2	32	
8	Arka Gdynia	30	13	5	12	35	32	+3	31	
9	Odra Opole	30	10	11	9	21	26	−5	31	
10	Lech Poznań	30	12	6	12	34	32	+2	30	
11	Ruch Chorzów	30	11	7	12	44	42	+2	29	
12	Zagłębie Sosnowiec	30	10	7	13	36	33	+3	27	
13	Stal Mielec	30	7	12	11	28	34	−6	26	
14	Zawisza Bydgoszcz	30	8	8	14	35	52	−17	24	
15	GKS Katowice (R)	30	7	7	16	32	44	−12	21	Relegated to II liga
16	Polonia Bytom (R)	30	3	10	17	23	47	−24	16	Relegated to II liga

Source: 90minut.pl (in Polish),
(C) Champions; (R) Relegated

== Results ==
Home \ Away	ARK	KAT	GÓR	LPO	LEG	ŁKS	OOP	BYT	RUC	STA	SZB	ŚLĄ	WID	WIS	ZSO	ZAW
Arka Gdynia		2–1	0–1	2–0	0–0	3–1	2–0	1–0	1–1	1–0	1–0	2–1	1–2	2–1	1–0	1–1
GKS Katowice	4–0		2–1	2–0	2–2	1–0	0–1	2–0	2–2	2–2	0–2	0–1	0–0	1–1	3–2	0–1
Górnik Zabrze	2–1	2–2		0–0	0–0	4–2	0–0	1–1	1–1	2–0	2–2	0–1	0–0	2–0	3–2	2–1
Lech Poznań	0–1	1–0	0–1		1–4	6–0	1–0	2–1	3–1	2–2	0–1	0–0	3–1	2–0	0–0	2–0
Legia Warsaw	2–1	0–1	2–0	1–0		0–1	2–1	2–1	4–1	0–2	2–0	1–0	1–1	2–0	1–1	0–0
ŁKS Łódź	1–0	2–1	1–1	0–2	2–0		0–1	1–1	3–1	0–0	0–0	2–1	1–1	2–1	3–2	3–0
Odra Opole	1–1	0–0	1–0	1–0	0–0	1–1		2–0	0–0	1–0	1–2	3–0	1–0	0–4	2–0	1–1
Polonia Bytom	0–2	3–1	0–2	0–0	0–2	1–1	4–0		3–1	0–0	0–2	0–0	1–1	2–2	2–3	1–2
Ruch Chorzów	1–0	2–0	1–3	5–0	3–2	0–3	0–0	4–0		4–0	0–1	3–1	1–2	2–1	0–0	5–1
Stal Mielec	1–4	1–0	0–0	0–1	4–2	3–1	0–0	1–0	0–0		0–0	1–2	1–3	2–0	2–0	0–0
Szombierki Bytom	1–0	3–2	3–1	0–0	5–0	1–2	3–0	1–1	3–0	2–1		1–2	3–0	1–1	1–0	1–0
Śląsk Wrocław	3–2	2–0	3–2	1–0	0–0	2–0	0–0	3–1	0–2	2–1	4–0		4–4	1–0	1–1	1–0
Widzew Łódź	1–1	3–2	6–1	0–3	1–0	1–1	1–1	2–0	2–1	1–1	2–0	1–2		0–2	1–0	3–1
Wisła Kraków	2–1	3–0	4–0	5–1	2–3	2–1	1–0	4–0	3–0	0–0	4–0	1–0	6–3		2–1	3–2
Zagłębie Sosnowiec	2–0	3–0	2–2	3–1	0–1	0–0	0–1	2–0	2–0	2–1	0–0	1–0	0–1	3–1		4–1
Zawisza Bydgoszcz	2–1	2–1	0–0	0–3	1–2	3–3	3–1	0–0	1–2	2–2	0–3	5–2	0–3	3–2	2–0	

Source: 90minut.pl (in Polish)
Legend: Blue = home team win; Yellow = draw; Red = away team win.

== Top goalscorers ==
Rank	Player	Club	Goals
1	(Poland) Kazimierz Kmiecik	Wisła Kraków	24
2	(Poland) Tadeusz Pawłowski	Śląsk Wrocław	16
3	(Poland) Zbigniew Mikolajow	Zagłębie Sosnowiec	12
3	(Poland) Roman Ogaza	Szombierki Bytom	12
5	(Poland) Tomasz Korynt	Arka Gdynia	11
5	(Poland) Albin Mikulski	Ruch Chorzów	11
5	(Poland) Bogdan Kwapisz	Zawisza Bydgoszcz	11
8	(Poland) Zbigniew Boniek	Widzew Łódź	10
8	(Poland) Eugeniusz Nagiel	Szombierki Bytom	10
8	(Poland) Marek Kusto	Legia Warsaw	10
8	(Poland) Tadeusz Małnowicz	Ruch Chorzów	10
8	(Poland) Romuald Chojnacki	Lech Poznań	10
8	(Poland) Andrzej Iwan	Wisła Kraków	10
8	(Poland) Pawel Janduda	Polonia Bytom	10

== Attendances ==
#	Club	Average
1	Zawisza Bydgoszcz	20,867
2	Lech Poznań	19,333
3	Górnik Zabrze	14,553
4	Arka Gdynia	13,000
5	Wisła Kraków	12,933
6	Widzew Łódź	12,733
7	Śląsk Wrocław	12,200
8	Legia Warszawa	11,800
9	Stal Mielec	11,733
10	Ruch Chorzów	10,867
11	Odra Opole	8,567
12	ŁKS	7,347
13	Zagłębie Sosnowiec	5,767
14	Szombierki Bytom	5,500
15	Katowice	5,467
16	Polonia Bytom	4,647
