= Szombierki Bytom =

Silesian football club

Coordinates: 50°19′50.69″N 18°53′51.15″E

- Full name: Towarzystwo Sportowe; Szombierki Bytom
- Nicknames: Zieloni (The Greens); Szombry
- Founded: November 1919; 106 years ago
- Ground: Stadion Szombierek
- Capacity: 20,000
- Chairman: Tomasz Buczyk
- Manager: Paweł Cygnar
- League: IV liga Silesia
- 2024–25: V liga Silesia I, 1st of 16 (promoted)
- Website: szombierkibytom.com
Home colours	Away colours

Szombierki Bytom (Polish pronunciation: [ʂɔmˈbjɛrkʲi ˈbɨtɔm]) is a Polish football club from the Szombierki district of Bytom. Szombierki currently competes in the IV liga Silesia.

Founded after World War I, their greatest achievement was winning the Polish championship during the 1979–80 season.

== Honours ==
Domestic

- Ekstraklasa
  - Champions: 1979–80
  - Runners-up: 1964–65
  - Third place: 1980–81
- Polish Cup
  - Semi-finalists: 1952, 1962–63, 1965–66 (reserves), 1972–73, 1979–80
- Polish U19 Championship
  - Runners-up: 1954, 1974

Europe

- European Cup
  - Second round: 1980–81
- UEFA Cup
  - First round: 1981–82

== European record ==
Season	Competition	Round	Country	Club	Home	Away	Aggregate/Position
1964–65	Intertoto Cup	Group B3	(Czechoslovakia)	MFK Košice	3–0	2–4	Winner/1st
1964–65	Intertoto Cup	Group B3	(East Germany)	Vorwärts Berlin	2–0	0–2	Winner/1st
1964–65	Intertoto Cup	Group B3	(Austria)	Wiener Sportclub	3–1	3–2	Winner/1st
1964–65	Intertoto Cup	1R	(Belgium)	RFC Liège	0–0	0–1	0–1
1980–81	European Cup	1R	(Turkey)	Trabzonspor	3–0	1–2	4–2
1980–81	European Cup	1/8	(Bulgaria)	CSKA Sofia	0–1	0–4	0–5
1981–82	UEFA Cup	1R	(Netherlands)	Feyenoord Rotterdam	1–1	0–2	1–3

== Fans ==
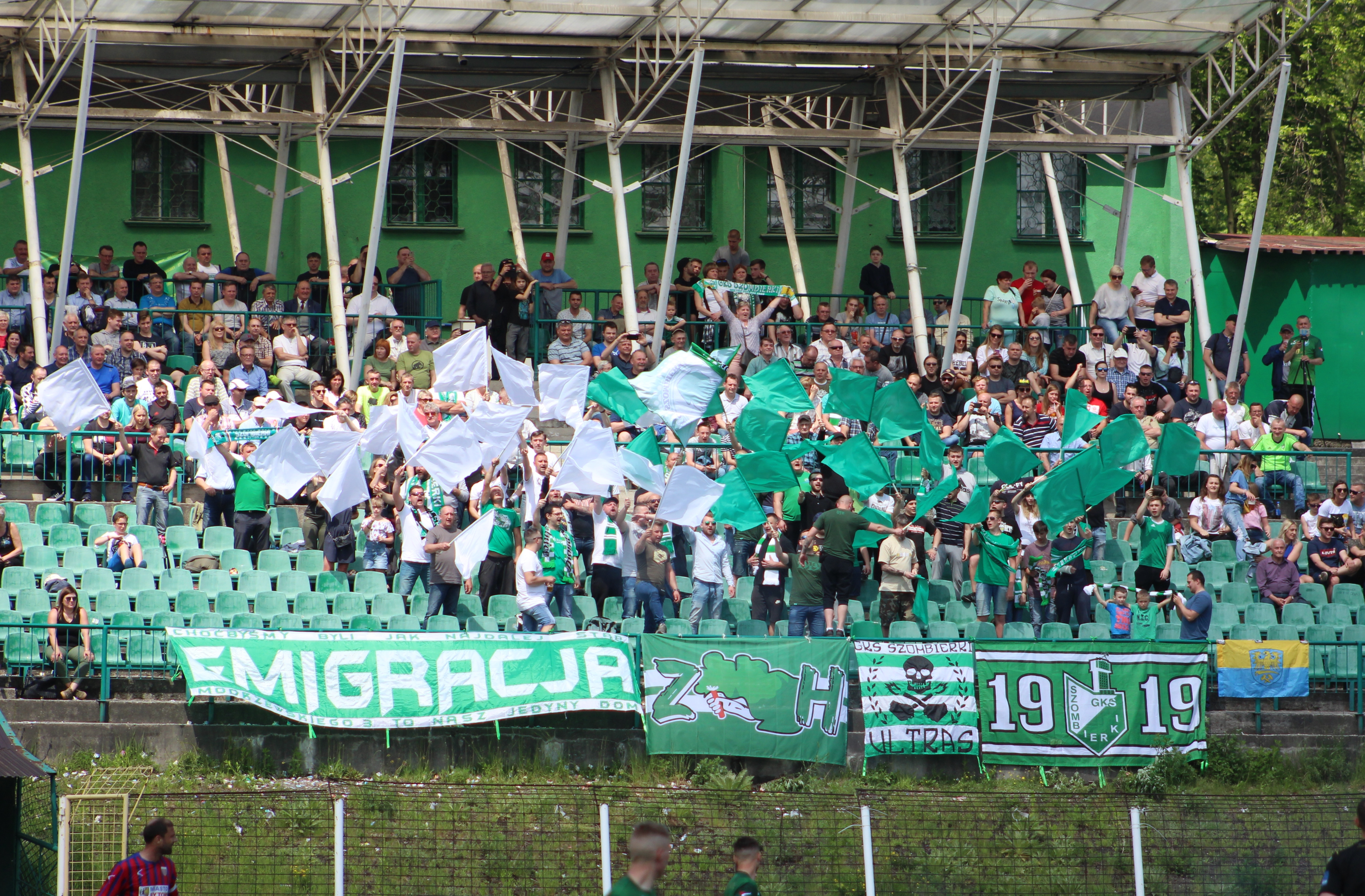
Szombierki fans during a Bytom derby match with Polonia Bytom in 2019.

Due to the number of large teams in close proximity the club has relatively modest support. The fans have strong cross-city rivalry with Polonia Bytom with whom they contest the Bytom derby. They used to have a strong friendship with fans of Szczakowianka Jaworzno.

== Bibliography ==
- Paweł Czado (2020). Zieloni. Szombierki, niezwykły śląski klub (in Polish). Wydawnictwo Żwakowskie. p. 1-240.
