= Sweden men's national under-19 football team =

National association football team

Sweden Under-19
- Nickname: Blågult (The Blue-Yellow)
- Association: Svenska Fotbollförbundet (SvFF)
- Confederation: UEFA (Europe)
- Head coach: Andreas Pettersson (Team 2006); Roger Franzén (Team 2007)
First colours	Second colours

First international
- Sweden 3–0 Finland (Helsingborg, Sweden; 1 August 1959)

UEFA U-19 Championship
- Appearances: 14 (first in 1963)
- Best result: Quarter-finals (1964, 1990)

FIFA U-20 World Cup
- Appearances: 1 (first in 1991)
- Best result: Group stage (1991)

The Sweden men's national under-19 football team (Swedish: svenska juniorlandslaget i fotboll) is the football team representing Sweden in competitions for under-19 year old players. Primarily, it competes to qualify for the annual UEFA European Under-19 Championship. Sweden made their first and so far only FIFA U-20 World Cup appearance in 1991, being knocked out in the group stage.

== Competitive record ==
Champions Runners-up Third place Fourth place Tournament held on home soil

=== FIFA U-20 World Cup ===
FIFA U-20 World Cup record									FIFA U-20 World Cup qualification record **					
Year	Round	Position	Pld	W	D	L	GF	GA	Pld	W	D	L	GF	GA
(Tunisia) 1977	Did not qualify								2	0	2	0	1	1
(Japan) 1979	Did not qualify								4	1	0	3	5	11
(Australia) 1981	Did not qualify								2	0	1	1	2	5
(Mexico) 1983	Did not qualify								2	0	1	1	1	2
(Soviet Union) 1985	Did not qualify								2	0	0	2	2	5
(Chile) 1987	Did not qualify								6	3	2	1	8	3
(Saudi Arabia) 1989	Did not qualify								6	2	3	1	10	10
(Portugal) 1991	Group stage	11th	3	1	0	2	4	6	8	4	2	2	21	7
(Australia) 1993	Did not qualify								6	0	4	2	10	14
(Qatar) 1995	Did not qualify								7	3	2	2	10	10
(Malaysia) 1997	Did not qualify								2	1	0	1	5	7
(Nigeria) 1999	Did not qualify								3	2	0	1	5	2
(Argentina) 2001	Did not qualify								3	1	1	1	7	5
(United Arab Emirates) 2003	Did not qualify								4	1	0	3	5	11
(Netherlands) 2005	Did not qualify								3	1	2	0	13	6
(Canada) 2007	Did not qualify								6	3	0	3	11	10
(Egypt) 2009	Did not qualify								6	2	0	4	7	10
(Colombia) 2011	Did not qualify								3	0	2	1	0	1
(Turkey) 2013	Did not qualify								3	0	2	1	1	2
(New Zealand) 2015	Did not qualify								6	4	0	2	16	6
(South Korea) 2017	Did not qualify								6	2	0	4	5	11
(Poland) 2019	Did not qualify								6	2	1	3	12	8
(Indonesia) ~~2021~~	Cancelled								3	1	1	1	7	4
(Argentina) 2023	Did not qualify								6	2	0	4	7	14
(Chile) 2025	Did not qualify								3	0	2	1	3	4
(Azerbaijan) (Uzbekistan) 2027	To be determined								To be determined					
(Armenia) (Georgia (country)) 2029	To be determined								To be determined					
Total	Best: Group stage	1/26	3	1	0	2	4	6	108	35	28	45	174	169

=== UEFA European Under-19 Championship ===
UEFA European Under-19 Championship record									UEFA European Under-19 Championship qualification record					
Year	Round	Position	Pld	W	D	L	GF	GA	Pld	W	D	L	GF	GA
(England) 1948	Did not enter								No qualification					
(Netherlands) 1949	Did not enter								No qualification					
(Austria) 1950	Did not enter								No qualification					
(France) 1951	Did not enter								No qualification					
(Spain) 1952	Did not enter								No qualification					
(Belgium) 1953	Did not enter								No qualification					
(West Germany) 1954	Did not enter								No qualification					
(Italy) 1955	Did not enter								No qualification					
(Hungary) 1956	Did not enter								No qualification					
(Spain) 1957	Did not enter								No qualification					
(Luxembourg) 1958	Did not enter								No qualification					
(Bulgaria) 1959	Did not enter								No qualification					
(Austria) 1960	Did not enter								No qualification					
(Portugal) 1961	Did not enter								No qualification					
(Romania) 1962	Did not enter								No qualification					
(England) 1963	Group stage	13th	3	0	1	2	6	9	1	1	0	0	2	0
(Netherlands) 1964	Quarter-finals	8th	3	1	0	2	3	3	No qualification					
(West Germany) 1965	Group stage	18th	2	0	1	1	3	7	No qualification					
(Socialist Federal Republic of Yugoslavia) 1966	Did not enter								Did not enter					
(Turkey) 1967	Group stage	11th	3	1	0	2	3	4	Automatically qualified					
(France) 1968	Did not enter								Did not enter					
(East Germany) 1969	Did not qualify								2	0	0	2	2	4
(Scotland) 1970	Group stage	12th	3	1	0	2	2	8	Automatically qualified					
(Czechoslovakia) 1971	Group stage	12th	3	0	1	2	3	5	2	2	0	0	9	1
(Spain) 1972	Did not qualify								2	0	1	1	3	7
(Italy) 1973	Did not qualify								2	0	0	2	1	3
(Sweden) 1974	Group stage	9th	3	1	1	1	4	4	Qualified as hosts					
(Switzerland) 1975	Did not qualify								2	0	0	2	2	4
(Hungary) 1976	Did not qualify								2	0	2	0	1	1
(Belgium) 1977	Group stage	7th	3	2	0	1	4	5	4	3	0	1	10	6
(Poland) 1978	Did not qualify								4	1	0	3	5	11
(Austria) 1979	Did not qualify								2	0	1	1	1	4
(East Germany) 1980	Did not qualify								2	0	1	1	2	5
(West Germany) 1981	Group stage	8th	3	0	3	0	3	3	2	1	1	0	2	1
(Finland) 1982	Did not qualify								2	0	1	1	1	2
(England) 1983	Group stage	14th	3	0	1	2	1	3	2	1	1	0	2	1
(Soviet Union) 1984	Did not qualify								2	0	0	2	2	5
(Socialist Federal Republic of Yugoslavia) 1986	Did not qualify								6	3	2	1	8	3
(Czechoslovakia) 1988	Did not qualify								6	2	3	1	10	10
(Hungary) 1990	Quarter-finals	5th	2	1	0	1	6	3	6	3	2	1	15	4
(Germany) 1992	Did not qualify								6	0	4	2	10	14
(England) 1993	Did not qualify								2	1	0	1	3	3
(Spain) 1994	Group stage	7th	3	0	1	2	2	6	4	3	1	0	8	4
(Greece) 1995	Did not qualify								4	2	1	1	3	1
(France) 1996	Did not qualify								2	1	0	1	5	7
(Iceland) 1997	Did not qualify								3	2	1	0	7	1
(Cyprus) 1998	Did not qualify								3	2	0	1	5	2
(Sweden) 1999	Group stage	7th	3	0	2	1	2	4	Qualified as hosts					
(Germany) 2000	Did not qualify								3	1	1	1	7	5
(Finland) 2001	Did not qualify								2	0	1	1	6	7
(Norway) 2002	Did not qualify								4	1	0	3	5	11
(Liechtenstein) 2003	Did not qualify								6	1	2	3	6	11
(Switzerland) 2004	Did not qualify								3	1	2	0	13	6
(Northern Ireland) 2005	Did not qualify								6	5	0	1	17	5
(Poland) 2006	Did not qualify								6	3	0	3	11	10
(Austria) 2007	Did not qualify								6	2	1	3	10	14
(Czech Republic) 2008	Did not qualify								6	2	0	4	7	10
(Ukraine) 2009	Did not qualify								6	1	2	3	10	14
(France) 2010	Did not qualify								3	0	2	1	0	1
(Romania) 2011	Did not qualify								3	0	0	3	2	8
(Estonia) 2012	Did not qualify								3	0	2	1	1	2
(Lithuania) 2013	Did not qualify								6	2	1	3	8	13
(Hungary) 2014	Did not qualify								6	4	0	2	16	6
(Greece) 2015	Did not qualify								6	2	2	2	10	9
(Germany) 2016	Did not qualify								6	2	0	4	5	11
(Georgia (country)) 2017	Group stage	7th	3	0	1	2	4	6	6	5	0	1	13	4
(Finland) 2018	Did not qualify								6	2	1	3	12	8
(Armenia) 2019	Did not qualify								3	1	1	1	5	5
(Northern Ireland) ~~2020~~	Cancelled								3	1	1	1	7	4
(Romania) ~~2021~~	Cancelled								Cancelled					
(Slovakia) 2022	Did not qualify								6	2	0	4	7	14
(Malta) 2023	Did not qualify								6	1	2	3	6	7
(Northern Ireland) 2024	Did not qualify								3	0	2	1	3	4
(Romania) 2025	Did not qualify								3	0	0	3	3	6
(Wales) 2026	Did not qualify								6	2	2	2	6	5
(Czech Republic) 2027	To be determined													
Total	Best: Quarter-finals	14/72	40	7	12	21	46	70	198	69	47	82	315	304

== Head-to-head record ==
The following table shows Sweden's head-to-head record in the FIFA U-20 World Cup.

Opponent	Pld	W	D	L	GF	GA	GD	Win %
Brazil	1	0	0	1	0	2	−2	0.00
Ivory Coast	1	1	0	0	4	1	+3	100.00
Mexico	1	0	0	1	0	3	−3	0.00
Total	3	1	0	2	4	6	−2	33.33

== See also ==
- Sweden men's national football team
- Sweden Olympic football team
- Sweden national under-21 football team
- Sweden men's national under-17 football team
- Sweden women's national under-19 football team
- FIFA U-20 World Cup
- UEFA European Under-19 Championship
