= Poland national under-18 football team =

National youth football team

Poland Under-18
- Nickname(s): Biało-czerwoni (The White and Reds); Białe Orły (The White Eagles)
- Association: Polish Football Association (Polski Związek Piłki Nożnej)
- Confederation: UEFA (Europe)
- Head coach: Łukasz Surma
- FIFA code: POL
First colours	Second colours

The Poland national under-18 football team represents Poland in international football at this age level and is controlled by Polish Football Association.

This team is for Polish players aged 18 or under at the start of a two-year UEFA European Under-19 Championship campaign.

== Competitive record ==
*Denotes draws include knockout matches decided on penalty kicks.
Gold background colour indicates that the tournament was won.
Silver background colour indicates second place finish.
Bronze background colour indicates third place finish.
Red border color indicates tournament was held on home soil.

=== FIFA Youth Tournament Under-18 ===
FIFA Youth Tournament Under-18 record
Year	Round	Pld	W	D*	L	GF	GA
(England) 1948	did not enter						
(Netherlands) 1949	did not enter						
(Austria) 1950	did not enter						
(France) 1951	did not enter						
(Spain) 1952	did not enter						
(Belgium) 1953	did not enter						
(West Germany) 1954	did not enter						
Total	Never entered	0	0	0	0	0	0

=== UEFA Youth Tournament Under-18 ===
UEFA Youth Tournament Under-18 record
Year	Round	Pld	W	D*	L	GF	GA
(Italy) 1955	Group stage	3	0	1	2	3	10
(Hungary) 1956	Group stage	3	1	1	1	4	4
(Spain) 1957	Group stage	3	1	1	1	4	6
(Luxembourg) 1958	Group stage	3	0	0	3	4	9
(Bulgaria) 1959	Group stage	3	0	2	1	5	9
(Austria) 1960	Group stage	3	1	0	2	5	8
(Portugal) 1961	Runners-up	4	2	1	1	8	8
(Romania) 1962	Group stage	3	1	1	1	4	6
(England) 1963	did not qualify						
(Netherlands) 1964	Group stage	2	1	1	0	2	1
(West Germany) 1965	Group stage	2	0	2	0	0	0
(Socialist Federal Republic of Yugoslavia) 1966	did not qualify						
(Turkey) 1967	Group stage	3	2	0	1	5	2
(France) 1968	did not qualify						
(East Germany) 1969	Group stage	3	0	1	2	0	4
(Scotland) 1970	did not qualify						
(Czechoslovakia) 1971	Group stage	3	0	2	1	2	6
(Spain) 1972	Third place	5	2	2	1	6	2
(Italy) 1973	did not qualify						
(Sweden) 1974	Group stage	3	1	0	2	3	4
(Switzerland) 1975	Group stage	3	1	0	2	1	4
(Hungary) 1976	did not qualify						
(Belgium) 1977	did not qualify						
(Poland) 1978	Third place	5	3	0	2	8	6
(Austria) 1979	Group stage	3	0	0	3	4	9
(East Germany) 1980	Runners-up	5	4	0	1	10	4
Total	Best: Runners-up	62	20	15	27	78	102

=== UEFA European U-18 Championship ===
UEFA European Under-18 Championship record
Year	Round	Pld	W	D*	L	GF	GA
(West Germany) 1981	Runners-up	5	2	2	1	7	4
(Finland) 1982	Fourth place	5	2	1	2	3	5
(England) 1983	did not qualify						
(Soviet Union) 1984	Third place	5	4	0	1	5	3
(Socialist Federal Republic of Yugoslavia) 1986	did not qualify						
(Czechoslovakia) 1988	did not qualify						
(Hungary) 1990	did not qualify						
(Germany) 1992	Quarter-final	2	0	0	2	3	6
(England) 1993	did not qualify						
(Spain) 1994	did not qualify						
(Greece) 1995	did not qualify						
(France) 1996	did not qualify						
(Iceland) 1997	did not qualify						
(Cyprus) 1998	did not qualify						
(Sweden) 1999	did not qualify						
(Germany) 2000	did not qualify						
(Finland) 2001	Champions	4	3	1	0	11	5
Total	Best: Champions	21	11	4	6	29	23

== Results and fixtures ==
The following is a list of match results from the last 12 months, as well as any future matches that have been scheduled.

Win Draw Loss Fixture

25 March 2026 2027 UEFA Euro Under-19 qualifying Round 1	Poland	1–1	Republic of Ireland	Glasgow, Scotland
12:00 CET (UTC+01:00)	Przybyłko 65'	Report	Finneran 13'	Stadium: Kirkintilloch Community Sports Complex; Attendance: 110; Referee: Rareș Vidican (Romania)

28 March 2026 2027 UEFA Euro Under-19 qualifying Round 1	Italy	1–1	Poland	Glasgow, Scotland
12:00 CEST (UTC+02:00)	Campaniello 16'	Report	Mozie 67'	Stadium: Kirkintilloch Community Sports Complex; Attendance: 83; Referee: Rareș Vidican (Romania)

31 March 2026 2027 UEFA Euro Under-19 qualifying Round 1	Scotland	3–0	Poland	Airdrie, Scotland
20:00 CEST (UTC+02:00)	McGrath 1'; Smith 35'; McCallion 80'	Report		Stadium: Excelsior Stadium; Referee: Sven Wolfensberger (Switzerland)

3 September 2026 Friendly	Poland	1–4	Sweden	Oliva Nova, Spain
15:00 CEST (UTC+02:00)	Kapusta 43'	Report	Eklund 38', 78' (pen.); Malki 54'; Persson 82'	Stadium: Oliva Nova Sports Center; Referee: Ignacio Sánchez-Ferragut (Spain)

6 September 2026 Friendly	Poland	0–1	Uruguay	Oliva Nova, Spain
10:00 CEST (UTC+02:00)		Report	Correia 83'	Stadium: Oliva Nova Sports Center

13 November 2026 Friendly	Czech Republic	0–3	Poland	Náchod, Czech Republic
12:00 CET (UTC+01:00)		Report	Bartczak 39'; Gliwa 52'; Pławiński 85'	Stadium: Stadion Běloves

16 November 2026 Friendly	Poland	1–0	Czech Republic	Kłodzko, Poland
12:00 CET (UTC+01:00)	Kapusta 29'	Report		Stadium: OSiR Stadium; Referee: Aleksander Borowiak (Poland)

== Selected coaches ==
- Władysław Stiasny (1960–1964)
- Andrzej Strejlau (1968–1970)
- Marian Szczechowicz
- Marek Janota (1974–1977)
- Edmund Zientara (1977–1978)
- Henryk Apostel (1977–1981)
- Mieczysław Broniszewski (1981–1988)
- Janusz Wójcik (1988)
- Mirosław Jabłoński (1990–1994)
- Michał Globisz (1996–2001, 2008–2009)
- Marcin Sasal (2013)
- Rafał Janas (2013–2016)
- Dariusz Dźwigała (2017–2018)
- Wojciech Tomaszewski (2018–2019)
- Wojciech Kobeszko (2022–2024)
- Łukasz Sosin (2024–2025)
- Radosław Sobolewski (2025–2026)
- Łukasz Surma (2026–present)

== Players ==
=== Current squad ===
The following players were called up for the friendly matches against Czech Republic on 13 and 17 November 2026.

Caps and goals updated as of 17 November 2026 after the match against Czech Republic.

No.	Pos.	Player	Date of birth (age)	Caps	Goals	Club
1	GK	Wiktor Żołneczko	29 April 2009 (age 17)	3	0	(Polish Football Association) Raków Częstochowa
12	GK	Kuba Bochniarz	5 March 2009 (age 17)	1	0	(Polish Football Association) Resovia
3	DF	Patrick Stachow	21 March 2009 (age 17)	2	0	(The Football Association) Arsenal
5	DF	Bartosz Korżyński	23 March 2009 (age 17)	4	0	(Polish Football Association) Legia Warsaw
11	DF	Piotr Bartczak	19 January 2009 (age 17)	4	1	(Polish Football Association) Lech Poznań II
16	DF	Hubert Janyszka	18 March 2009 (age 17)	3	0	(Polish Football Association) Lech Poznań
2	DF	Krystian Tymoszczuk	13 June 2009 (age 17)	2	0	(Polish Football Association) Jagiellonia Białystok II
6	MF	Philip Buchta	22 March 2009 (age 17)	4	0	(German Football Association) Eintracht Frankfurt
7	MF	Natan Ława	26 June 2009 (age 17)	4	0	(Polish Football Association) Pogoń Szczecin
8	MF	Patryk Prajsnar	5 February 2009 (age 17)	4	0	(Polish Football Association) Stal Mielec
10	MF	Bartosz Szywała	13 January 2009 (age 17)	4	0	(Football Association of the Czech Republic) Slavia Prague B
13	MF	Hubert Szulc	10 March 2009 (age 17)	1	0	(Polish Football Association) Raków Częstochowa II
15	MF	Bartłomiej Miąsko	20 April 2009 (age 17)	2	0	(Polish Football Association) Raków Częstochowa II
17	MF	Oliwier Pławiński	31 January 2009 (age 17)	3	1	(Polish Football Association) Wisła Kraków
18	MF	Aleksander Wołosowski	19 January 2009 (age 17)	3	0	(Polish Football Association) Śląsk Wrocław II
20	MF	Jakub Gliwa	14 April 2009 (age 17)	4	1	(Polish Football Association) Legia Warsaw II
21	MF	Antoni Kapusta	5 September 2009 (age 17)	3	2	(Polish Football Association) Polonia Warsaw
23	MF	Jan Konachowicz	24 April 2009 (age 17)	4	0	(Polish Football Association) Jagiellonia Białystok II
9	FW	Maciej Kucharski	17 April 2009 (age 17)	4	0	(Polish Football Association) Piast Gliwice
19	FW	Marcel Płocica	28 April 2009 (age 17)	2	0	(Polish Football Association) Sandecja Nowy Sącz

=== Recent call-ups ===
The following players (born in 2009 or later) have previously been called up to the Poland under-18 squad in the last 12 months and are still eligible to represent:

Pos.	Player	Date of birth (age)	Caps	Goals	Club	Latest call-up
DF	Adrian Lis-Zieliński	18 April 2009 (age 17)	2	0	(Spain) Atlético Madrid	v. Czech Republic, 13 November 2026 ^{INJ}
DF	Gabriel Sambou	25 November 2009 (age 16)	0	0	(England) Chelsea	v. Sweden, 3 October 2026 ^{WD}
DF	Kacper Cecuła	6 January 2009 (age 17)	0	0	(Poland) Cracovia	v. Sweden, 3 October 2026 ^{WD}
MF	Aleksander Klimkiewicz	1 March 2009 (age 17)	2	0	(Poland) Lech Poznań	v. Uruguay, 6 October 2026
MF	Filip Kołodziejski	21 July 2009 (age 17)	1	0	(Poland) Zagłębie Lubin II	v. Uruguay, 6 October 2026
MF	Sebastian Sopel	2 July 2009 (age 17)	0	0	(Poland) ŁKS Łódź	v. Sweden, 3 October 2026 ^{WD}
FW	Antoni Bartoszewicz	27 April 2009 (age 17)	1	0	(Poland) Znicz Pruszków	v. Uruguay, 6 October 2026
^{WD} Withdrew from the squad.

== See also ==
- Poland national football team
- Poland Olympic football team
- Poland national under-21 football team
- Poland national under-20 football team
- Poland national under-19 football team
- Poland national under-17 football team
- Poland national under-16 football team
