= Northern Ireland national under-19 football team =

National under-19 association football team representing Northern Ireland

Northern Ireland Under-19
- Nickname(s): The GAWA, Norn Iron
- Association: Irish Football Association
- Confederation: UEFA (Europe)
- Head coach: Gareth McAuley
- Home stadium: various
- FIFA code: NIR
First colours	Second colours

First international
- Ireland Youth 0–4 Wales (Solitude, Belfast; 10 January 1948)

European Championship
- Appearances: 14 (first in 1948)
- Best result: Runners-Up: 1963

The Northern Ireland national under-19 football team also known as Northern Ireland under-19s or Northern Ireland U19s represents Northern Ireland in association football at under-19 level. It is controlled by the Irish Football Association and began under the name of Ireland Youth when the Home Nations first held a round robin of friendly matches in 1948. The same year they entered the first International Youth Tournament, now the UEFA European Under-19 Football Championship. Their best performance was in 1963 when they finished as runner-up. The team evolved into the Northern Ireland under-18 team then the current under-19 team. As well as the UEFA Under-19 Championships the team also enters the annual Milk Cup (currently as an under-20 side). In addition, the team plays regular friendlies, sometimes as an under-20 or under-18 team by agreement of the opposing association.

== Competitive record ==
Champions Runners-up Third Place Fourth Place

=== European Championships ===
- 1948–1954 – FIFA Junior Tournament
- 1955–1980 – UEFA Junior Tournament
- 1981–2001 – UEFA European U-18 Championship
- 2002–present – UEFA European U-19 Championship

UEFA European Under-18/19 Championship Finals record									Qualification record						
Year*	Round	Pld	W	D	L	GF	GA	GD	Pld	W	D	L	GF	GA	GD
(England) 1948	First round	3	1	0	2	7	12	−5	No qualification needed						
(Netherlands) 1949	Fourth place	3	0	1	2	3	10	–7	No qualification needed						
(Austria) 1950	did not enter								did not enter						
(France) 1951	Fourth place	3	1	0	2	3	3	0	No qualification needed						
(Spain) 1952	did not enter								did not enter						
(Belgium) 1953	First round	4	1	0	3	11	16	−5	No qualification needed						
(West Germany) 1954	Group stage	5	0	0	5	4	22	−18	No qualification needed						
(Italy) 1955	Group stage	3	0	1	2	2	9	−7	No qualification needed						
(Hungary) 1956	did not enter								did not enter						
(Spain) 1957	did not enter								did not enter						
(Luxembourg) 1958	did not enter								did not enter						
(Bulgaria) 1959	did not enter								did not enter						
(Austria) 1960	did not enter								did not enter						
(Portugal) 1961	did not enter								did not enter						
(Romania) 1962	did not enter								did not enter						
(England) 1963	Runners-up	5	2	2	1	9	11	–2	2	1	1	0	4	3	+1
(Netherlands) 1964	Group stage	2	1	0	1	2	3	−1	No qualification needed						
(West Germany) 1965	did not enter								did not enter						
(Socialist Federal Republic of Yugoslavia) 1966	did not enter								did not enter						
(Turkey) 1967	did not enter								did not enter						
(France) 1968	did not enter								did not enter						
(East Germany) 1969	did not enter								did not enter						
(Scotland) 1970	did not enter								did not enter						
(Czechoslovakia) 1971	did not enter								did not enter						
(Spain) 1972	did not enter								did not enter						
(Italy) 1973	did not enter								did not enter						
(Sweden) 1974	did not enter								did not enter						
(Switzerland) 1975	Group stage	3	1	1	1	3	4	−1	2	2	0	0	5	2	+3
(Hungary) 1976	Group stage	3	0	0	3	3	10	−7	Walkover against Scotland						
(Belgium) 1977	Group stage	3	2	0	1	3	1	+2	2	1	0	1	2	1	+1
(Poland) 1978	did not qualify								2	0	0	2	2	9	−7
(Austria) 1979	did not qualify								4	1	1	2	4	6	−2
(Czechoslovakia) 1980	Group stage	3	0	1	2	2	4	−2	2	1	1	0	2	0	+2
(West Germany) 1981	did not qualify								2	0	0	2	0	4	−4
(Finland) 1982	did not qualify								2	1	0	1	1	2	−1
(England) 1983	did not qualify								4	0	1	3	2	9	−7
(Soviet Union) 1984	did not qualify								2	1	0	1	1	3	−2
(Socialist Federal Republic of Yugoslavia) 1986	did not qualify								6	0	2	4	5	12	−7
(Czechoslovakia) 1988	did not qualify								6	1	1	4	8	14	−6
(Hungary) 1990	did not enter								did not enter						
(Germany) 1992	did not qualify								6	0	3	3	4	10	−6
(England) 1993	did not qualify								4	0	1	3	8	14	−6
(Spain) 1994	did not qualify								2	0	2	0	1	1	0
(Greece) 1995	did not qualify								2	2	0	2	6	6	0
(France) 1996	did not qualify								2	1	0	1	4	3	+1
(Iceland) 1997	did not qualify								2	0	0	2	0	6	−6
(Cyprus) 1998	did not qualify								2	1	0	1	6	2	+4
(Sweden) 1999	did not qualify								5	3	0	2	9	5	+4
(Germany) 2000	did not qualify								5	3	1	1	12	5	+7
(Finland) 2001	did not qualify								2	0	0	2	1	4	−3
(Norway) 2002	did not qualify								3	1	1	1	2	2	0
(Liechtenstein) 2003	did not qualify								6	2	1	3	10	6	+4
(Switzerland) 2004	did not qualify								3	0	1	2	2	5	−3
(Northern Ireland) 2005	Group stage	3	0	0	3	1	4	−3	Qualified as hosts						
(Poland) 2006	did not qualify								6	2	1	3	10	9	+1
(Austria) 2007	did not qualify								3	0	0	3	2	8	−6
(Czech Republic) 2008	did not qualify								3	0	1	2	2	4	−2
(Ukraine) 2009	did not qualify								3	1	0	2	4	7	−3
(France) 2010	did not qualify								6	1	1	4	10	9	+1
(Romania) 2011	did not qualify								3	1	1	1	3	3	0
(Estonia) 2012	did not qualify								3	1	0	2	5	8	−3
(Lithuania) 2013	did not qualify								3	1	1	1	9	4	+5
(Hungary) 2014	did not qualify								3	1	0	2	1	4	−3
(Greece) 2015	did not qualify								3	1	0	2	5	7	−2
(Germany) 2016	did not qualify								6	1	1	4	4	9	−5
(Georgia (country)) 2017	did not qualify								3	1	0	2	2	5	−3
(Finland) 2018	did not qualify								3	0	1	2	2	9	−7
(Armenia) 2019	did not qualify								3	1	1	1	4	5	−1
(Northern Ireland) 2020	Cancelled due to COVID-19 pandemic								Qualified as hosts						
(Romania) 2021	Cancelled due to COVID-19 pandemic								Cancelled due to COVID-19 pandemic						
(Slovakia) 2022	did not qualify								3	1	0	2	2	5	−3
(Malta) 2023	did not qualify								6	1	2	3	7	11	−4
(Northern Ireland) 2024	Group stage	3	0	1	2	0	5	-5	Qualified as hosts						
(Romania) 2025	did not qualify								3	1	0	2	2	7	−5
(Wales) 2026	did not qualify								3	2	0	1	2	4	−2
(Czech Republic) 2027	To be determined														
Total	Runners-up	46	9	7	30	53	114	–61	146	39	27	82	177	252	–75
*Red border colour indicates tournament was held on home soil.

== Honours ==
=== Milk Cup Elite Section ===
- Winners: 1997, 2008, 2009, 2014

== Coaches ==
Coaches of the Northern Ireland youth/under-18/under-19 side include:

Manager	Career
(Northern Ireland) Billy Cook	
(Northern Ireland) Norman Kernaghan	
(Northern Ireland) Joe Kinkead	
(Northern Ireland) Tommy Casey	
(Northern Ireland) Jackie Cummings	1979–??
(Northern Ireland) Roy Millar	1983–1999
(Northern Ireland) Mal Donaghy	2000–2008
(England) Steve Beaglehole	2008–2011
(Northern Ireland) Stephen Robinson	2011–2013
(Northern Ireland) Stephen Craigan	2013–2016
(Scotland) Stephen Frail	2016–2020
(Northern Ireland) Gerard Lyttle	2021–2023
(Northern Ireland) Gareth McAuley	2023–

== Players ==
=== Current squad ===
Players born on or after 1 January 2008 will be eligible until the end of the 2027 UEFA European Under-19 Championship.

The following players were named in the squad for the friendly matches against Belgium on 2 October and Wales on 5 October 2026.

Caps and goals correct as of 5 October 2026, after the match against Wales.

No.	Pos.	Player	Date of birth (age)	Caps	Goals	Club
	GK	Finn McDonnell	10 January 2008 (age 18)	2	0	(Football Association of Ireland) Bohemians
	GK	Dan O'Keefe	21 December 2008 (age 17)	2	0	(Football Association of Wales) Wrexham
	DF	Broghan Sewell	13 October 2008 (age 18)	6	0	(The Football Association) Southampton
	DF	Callum Leacock	19 August 2008 (age 18)	6	0	(The Football Association) West Ham United
	DF	Alfie Wilson	14 March 2009 (age 17)	4	0	(Scottish Football Association) Heart of Midlothian
	DF	Shea McGarry	18 August 2009 (age 17)	4	1	(Scottish Football Association) Celtic
	DF	Coist Walker	30 October 2008 (age 18)	4	0	(The Football Association) Hull City
	DF	Calum Anderson	9 January 2009 (age 17)	3	0	(The Football Association) Southampton
	DF	Alfie McIlroy	7 September 2008 (age 18)	0	0	(The Football Association) Blackburn Rovers
	MF	Matthew Burns	16 September 2008 (age 18)	3	0	(The Football Association) Sunderland
	MF	Troy Savage	7 March 2008 (age 18)	3	0	(The Football Association) Burnley
	MF	Jahmi Kellyman	6 July 2009 (age 17)	2	0	(The Football Association) Aston Villa
	MF	Jay McEvoy	16 October 2008 (age 18)	2	0	(The Football Association) Manchester United
	MF	Ben Wilson	12 August 2008 (age 18)	2	0	(The Football Association) Brentford
	FW	George Feeney	19 January 2008 (age 18)	6	0	(The Football Association) Tottenham Hotpur
	FW	Joel Kerr	24 March 2009 (age 17)	5	0	(The Football Association) West Ham United
	FW	Sid Eldred	1 February 2008 (age 18)	3	1	(The Football Association) Ipswich Town
	FW	Coran Madden	5 February 2009 (age 17)	4	1	(The Football Association) Brentford
	FW	Luke Hawe	30 April 2009 (age 17)	2	0	(The Football Association) Southampton
	FW	Shay Reid	18 July 2008 (age 18)	1	0	(The Football Association) Preston North End
	FW	Eamonn Tohill	13 September 2009 (age 17)	1	0	(The Football Association) Middlesbrough
	FW	Emmett Morrison	23 March 2009 (age 17)	0	0	(The Football Association) Sheffield United

=== Recent call-ups ===
The following players have previously been called up to the Northern Ireland under-19 squad and remain eligible.

Pos.	Player	Date of birth (age)	Caps	Goals	Club	Latest call-up
DF	Alfie Mitchell	3 May 2008 (age 18)	-	-	(Northern Ireland) Bangor	v. Kazakhstan, 31 March 2026
DF	Noah McDonnell	16 June 2008 (age 18)	-	-	(Scotland) Aberdeen	v. Switzerland, 14 October 2025
MF	Ceadach O'Neill	10 April 2008 (age 18)	-	-	(England) Arsenal	v. Kazakhstan, 31 March 2026
MF	Kalum Thompson	27 September 2008 (age 18)	-	-	(England) Nottingham Forest	v. Czech Republic, 18 November 2025
MF	Brandon Downey	15 December 2008 (age 17)	-	-	(England) Portsmouth	v. Czech Republic, 18 November 2025
FW	Paul McGovern	9 January 2008 (age 18)	-	-	(Northern Ireland) Glenavon	v. Kazakhstan, 31 March 2026
^{COVID} = Player withdrew due to a positive COVID test or from being in close contact with someone with a positive COVID test.^{INJ} = Player withdrew from the squad before any games had been played.^{PRE} = Preliminary squad / standby.^{SEN} = Player withdrew from the squad due to a call up to the senior team.^{SUS} = Suspended from national team.^{WTD} = Withdrew due to other reasons.

== See also ==
- Northern Ireland national football team
- Northern Ireland national under-21 football team
- Northern Ireland national under-17 football team
