= Saarland national under-18 football team =

Saarland Under-18
1953–1956
- Association: Saarländischer Fußballbund (SFB)
- Confederation: UEFA (Europe)
- FIFA code: SAA

First international
- Spain 5–0 Saar (Mechelen, Belgium; 31 March 1953)

Last international
- Saar 2–2 Belgium (Győr, Hungary; 1 April 1956)

Biggest win
- Saar 3–0 France (Siegburg, West Germany; 18 April 1954)

Biggest defeat
- Argentina 7–0 Saar (Lier, Belgium; 2 April 1953)

UEFA European Under-18 Championship
- Appearances: 4 (first in 1953)
- Best result: 13th place (1953, 1954), group stage (1955, 1956)

The Saarland national under-18 football team represented the Saar Protectorate at the under-18 age level in men's international football. The team participated in the UEFA European Under-18 Championship (previously the FIFA International Youth Tournament) between 1953 and 1956. The team ceased to exist in 1957, when control of Saarland was given to West Germany.

== History ==
Saarland played their first under-18 match on 31 March 1953 in the 1953 FIFA Youth Tournament Under-18 against Spain, which finished as a 0–5 loss. They finished the tournament tied in 13th place, after they refused to play extra time in their match against Switzerland. They also finished in 13th place the following year, winning 3–0 against France for the team's best ever result. The following two editions only featured a group stage, with Saarland finishing third out of four teams in their group on both occasions. Their last match in the 1956 tournament was a 2–2 draw with Belgium on 1 April. The team played no further matches as the Saar Protectorate became a part of West Germany at the start of 1957.

== UEFA European Under-18 Championship record ==
Winners Runners-up Third place Tournament hosted

UEFA European Under-18 Championship
Year	Host	Position	Pld	W	D	L	F	A
1948 to 1950		Part of West Germany						
1951 to 1952		Did not enter						
1953	Belgium	13th place (Note: Saarland finished tied in 13th place, as they refused to play extra time in their match against Switzerland.)	4	1	1	2	8	19
1954	West Germany	13th place	6	3	1	2	9	14
1955	Italy	Group stage	3	1	0	2	4	6
1956	Hungary	Group stage	3	1	1	1	3	5
Total			16	6	3	7	24	44
