= Republic of Ireland national under-19 football team =

National under-19 association football team representing Republic of Ireland

Republic of Ireland Under-19
- Association: Football Association of Ireland
- Head coach: John Cotter
- Top scorer: Adam Rooney (11); Sam Byrne (11)
First colours	Second colours

Biggest win
- Gibraltar 0–13 Ireland (Republic of Ireland) (Straßwalchen, Austria; 16 November 2019)

Biggest defeat
- Spain 5–0 Ireland (Republic of Ireland) (Romania, 29 July 2011)

UEFA Under-19 Euros
- Appearances: 20 (first in 1948)
- Best result: Winner: 1998

FIFA World Youth Championship
- Appearances: 5 (first in 1985)
- Best result: Third (1997)

The Republic of Ireland national under-19 football team, is the national under-19 association football team of the Republic of Ireland, controlled by the Football Association of Ireland, and competes in the biennial European Under-19 Football Championship.

The team has competed in several championships.

== Competitive record ==
=== FIFA U-20 World Cup ===
The Republic of Ireland Under-19s have qualified for the FIFA U-20 World Cup (formerly the FIFA World Youth Championship) on 5 occasions, finishing 3rd in 1997.

Year	Round	Pld	W	D	L	GF	GA	Squad
FIFA World Youth Championship
(Tunisia) 1977 to (Mexico) 1983	Did not qualify							
(Soviet Union) 1985	Group stage	3	0	0	3	3	7	Squad
(Chile) 1987	Did not qualify							
(Saudi Arabia) 1989	Did not qualify							
(Portugal) 1991	Group stage	3	0	2	1	3	5	Squad
(Australia) 1993	Did not qualify							
(Qatar) 1995	Did not qualify							
(Malaysia) 1997	Third place play-off	7	4	1	2	9	7	Squad
(Nigeria) 1999	Round of 16	4	2	1	1	7	2	Squad
(Argentina) 2001	Did not qualify							
(United Arab Emirates) 2003	Round of 16	4	2	1	1	8	6	Squad
(Netherlands) 2005	Did not qualify							
FIFA U-20 World Cup
(Canada) 2007 to (Poland) 2019	Did not qualify							
(Indonesia) ~~2021~~	Cancelled due to COVID-19 pandemic							
(Argentina) 2023	Did not qualify							
(Chile) 2025	Did not qualify							
(Azerbaijan) (Uzbekistan) 2027	Did not qualify							
(Armenia) (Georgia (country)) 2029	To be determined							

=== UEFA European Under-19 Championship ===
The Republic of Ireland Under-19s have qualified for the UEFA European Under-19 Championship (formerly the UEFA European Under-18 Championship) 20 times, winning the competition in 1998.

Year	Round	Pld	W	D	L	GF	GA	Squad
FIFA Youth Tournament
(England) 1948	First Round (5th)	2	1	0	1	1	2	Squad
(Netherlands) 1949	Did not enter							
(Austria) 1950	Did not enter							
(France) 1951	Did not enter							
(Spain) 1952	Did not enter							
(Belgium) 1953	Quarter-final (6th)	4	2	0	2	4	8	Squad
(West Germany) 1954	Group Stage (16th)	5	0	1	4	4	12	Squad
UEFA European Under-18 Championship
(Italy) 1955 to (Romania) 1962	Did not enter							
(England) 1963	Did not qualify							
(Netherlands) 1964	Group Stage	2	0	0	2	0	7	Squad
(West Germany) 1965	Quarter-final (7th)	5	2	1	2	5	7	Squad
(Socialist Federal Republic of Yugoslavia) 1966	Did not enter							
(Turkey) 1967	Did not enter							
(France) 1968	Did not qualify							
(East Germany) 1969	Did not enter							
(Scotland) 1970	Did not qualify							
(Czechoslovakia) 1971	Did not enter							
(Spain) 1972	Group Stage	3	0	1	2	1	7	Squad
(Italy) 1973	Group Stage	3	1	0	2	3	5	Squad
(Sweden) 1974	Did not qualify							
(Switzerland) 1975	Group Stage	3	1	0	2	3	3	Squad
(Hungary) 1976	Did not qualify							
(Belgium) 1977	Group Stage	3	1	1	1	2	4	Squad
(Poland) 1978	Did not qualify							
(Austria) 1979	Did not qualify							
(East Germany) 1980	Did not qualify							
(West Germany) 1981	Did not qualify							
(Finland) 1982	Group Stage	3	0	0	3	2	7	Squad
(England) 1983	Group Stage	3	1	2	0	2	1	Squad
(Soviet Union) 1984	Third place play-off	5	2	1	2	9	7	Squad
(Socialist Federal Republic of Yugoslavia) 1986	Did not qualify							
(Czechoslovakia) 1988	Did not qualify							
(Hungary) 1990	Quarter-final	2	1	0	1	1	3	Squad
(Germany) 1992	Did not qualify							
(England) 1993	Did not qualify							
(Spain) 1994	Did not qualify							
(Greece) 1995	Did not qualify							
(France) (Luxembourg) 1996	Group Stage	3	0	2	1	1	2	Squad
(Iceland) 1997	Third place play-off	4	1	1	2	5	6	Squad
(Cyprus) 1998	Champions	4	2	1	1	9	4	Squad
(Sweden) 1999	Third place play-off	4	1	1	2	5	6	Squad
(Germany) 2000	Did not qualify							
(Finland) 2001	Did not qualify							
UEFA European Under-19 Championship
(Norway) 2002	Third place play-off	4	2	0	2	6	8	Squad
(Liechtenstein) 2003	Did not qualify							
(Switzerland) 2004	Did not qualify							
(Northern Ireland) 2005	Did not qualify (Elite round)							
(Poland) 2006	Did not qualify (Elite round)							
(Austria) 2007	Did not qualify (Elite round)							
(Czech Republic) 2008	Did not qualify							
(Ukraine) 2009	Did not qualify (Elite round)							
(France) 2010	Did not qualify (Elite round)							
(Romania) 2011	Semi-final	4	1	1	2	3	8	Squad
(Estonia) 2012	Did not qualify (Elite round)							
(Lithuania) 2013	Did not qualify (Elite round)							
(Hungary) 2014	Did not qualify (Elite round)							
(Greece) 2015	Did not qualify (Elite round)							
(Germany) 2016	Did not qualify							
(Georgia (country)) 2017	Did not qualify (Elite round)							
(Finland) 2018	Did not qualify (Elite round)							
(Armenia) 2019	Semi-final	4	1	1	2	3	7	Squad
(Northern Ireland) ~~2020~~	Cancelled due to COVID-19 pandemic							
(Romania) ~~2021~~	Cancelled due to COVID-19 pandemic							
(Slovakia) 2022	Did not qualify (Elite round)							
(Malta) 2023	Did not qualify (Elite round)							
(Northern Ireland) 2024	Did not qualify							
(Romania) 2025	Did not qualify (Elite round)							
(Wales) 2026	Did not qualify							
(Czech Republic) 2027	To be determined							

== Achievements ==
The Republic won the UEFA European Under-18 Football Championship in Cyprus in 1998 and that remains their best performance to date.

- U-18 European Championship in 1998 – 1st place (Coach Brian Kerr)

In July 2011 Republic of Ireland national under-19 football team reached the semi-finals of the 2011 UEFA European Under-19 Football Championship held in Romania where they were eliminated by Spain.

== Honours ==
- UEFA European Under-19 Football Championship
  - Under-19 era, 2002–present

Champions (0):
Runner-up (0):
Third Place (0):
Fourth Place (1): 2002
Semi-Finalist (1): 2011, 2019

  - Under-18 era, 1957–2001

Champions (1): 1998
Runner-up (0):
Third Place (1): 1999
Fourth Place (2): 1984, 1997

- FIFA U-20 World Cup

Champions (0):
Runner-up (0):
Third Place (1): 1997
Fourth Place (0):

== Results and fixtures ==
The following is a list of match results in the last 12 months, as well as any future matches that have been scheduled.

Legend

Win Draw Lose Fixture

=== 2025 ===
5 September Friendly	France	4–1	Republic of Ireland	Clairefontaine-en-Yvelines, France
15:00 (16:00 CET)	Enzo Molebe; Enzo Molebe; Zaid Seha; Quentin Ndjantou Mbitcha	Report	Alfie Lynskey 47'	Stadium: INF Clairefontaine

9 September Friendly	France	1–0	Republic of Ireland	Clairefontaine-en-Yvelines, France
10:00 (11:00 CET)	Axel Tape 57'	Report		Stadium: INF Clairefontaine

10 October Friendly	Albania	1–2	Republic of Ireland	Durrës, Albania
10:00 (11:00 CET)	Huqi Mattia 36'; Joi Nuredini 87' (pen.)	Report	Zak O'Sullivan 75'

12 October Friendly	Albania	2–2	Republic of Ireland	Durrës, Albania
10:00 (11:00 CET)	Bjorni Duka 62'; Joi Nuredini 70'	Report	Daniel Mare 52'; Pijus Otegbayo 90+2'

12 November 2026 UEFA European Under-19 Championship qualification	Republic of Ireland	0–1	Kazakhstan	Oldenzaal, Netherlands
18:00 GMT		Report	Azamat Tuyakbayev 56'; Karim Makhametzhan (yellow card) 90' (yellow-red card)	Stadium: Sportpark Vondersweijde; Referee: Bence Csonka (Hungary)

15 November 2026 UEFA European Under-19 Championship qualification	Republic of Ireland	1–0	Cyprus	Oldebroek, Netherlands
12:00 GMT	Alfie Lynskey 11'	Report	Michail Theodosiou (penalty missed) 56'	Stadium: Sportpark Bovenmolen; Referee: Danilo Nikolić (Serbia)

18 November 2026 UEFA European Under-19 Championship qualification	Netherlands	4–2	Republic of Ireland	Oldebroek, Netherlands
18:00 GMT	Nassim El Harmouz 11'; Shane Kluivert 79'; Luca Messori 83'; Tobias van den Elshout 90+2'	Report	Taylor McCarthy 37'; Adam Brennan 51'	Stadium: Sportpark Bovenmolen; Referee: Damian Kos (Poland)

=== 2026 ===
25 March 2027 UEFA European Under-19 Championship qualification	Poland	1–1	Republic of Ireland	Glasgow, Scotland
11:00 GMT	Filip Przybyłko 65'	Report	Rory Finneran 13'; Kian McMahon-Brown (penalty missed) 79'	Stadium: Kirkintilloch Community Sports Complex; Referee: Rares Vidican (Romania)

28 March 2027 UEFA European Under-19 Championship qualification	Republic of Ireland	3–3	Scotland	Glasgow, Scotland
15:30 GMT	Oisin McDonagh 39'; Kian McMahon-Brown 50'; Cillian Tollett 69'	Report	Aiden McCallion 30'; Tommy North 54'; Joseph Teasdale 81'	Stadium: Kirkintilloch Community Sports Complex; Referee: Karel Rouček (Czech Republic)

31 March 2027 UEFA European Under-19 Championship qualification	Republic of Ireland	1–2	Italy	Glasgow, Scotland
19:00 GMT	Kian McMahon-Brown 56'	Report	Antonio Arena 3'; Antonio Arena 46'	Stadium: Kirkintilloch Community Sports Complex; Referee: Karel Rouček (Czech Republic)

25 September Friendly	England	1–0	Republic of Ireland	Burton upon Trent, England
19:00 (16:00 CET)	Max Dowman 70'	Report		Stadium: St George's Park National Football Centre; Referee: Luke Hood (England)

28 September Friendly	Faroe Islands	0–5	Republic of Ireland	Preddvor, Slovenia
11:00 (12:00 CET)		Report	Cillian Tollett 30'; Cillian Tollett 36'; Charles Akinrintoyo 59'; Gavin McAteer 74'; Josh Cullen 84'	Stadium: Športni Park Preddvor; Referee: Jakob Sitar (Slovenia)

1 October Friendly	Qatar	1–1	Republic of Ireland	Kranjska Gora, Slovenia
16:00 (17:00 CET)	TBC	Report	Ramón Martos 42'	Stadium: Football Training Centre Kranjska Gora

3 October Friendly	Slovenia	1–2	Republic of Ireland	Kranjska Gora, Slovenia
11:00 (12:00 CET)	Blaz Kovac 11'	Report	Charles Akinrintoyo 12'; Ramón Martos 72'	Stadium: Football Training Centre Kranjska Gora; Referee: Vanja Jankovic (Slovenia)

11 November 2027 UEFA European Under-19 Championship qualification Round 2	Republic of Ireland	2–0	Greece	Plaintel, France
14:00 GMT	Michael Noonan 58'; Billy O'Neill 63'	Report		Stadium: Espace Oceane; Referee: Mihály Káprály (Hungary)

14 November 2027 UEFA European Under-19 Championship qualification Round 2	France	2–2	Republic of Ireland	Guingamp, France
17:00 GMT	Mohamed Chebbi 21'; Mohamed Chebbi 24'	Report	Vinnie Leonard 7'; Vinnie Leonard 64'	Stadium: Stade de Roudourou; Referee: Mihály Káprály (Hungary)

17 November 2027 UEFA European Under-19 Championship qualification Round 2	Norway	2–2	Republic of Ireland	Plaintel, France
14:00 GMT	Harald Woxen 56'; Sebastian Ademola 90+3'	Report	Gavin McAteer 31'; Billy O'Neill 60'; Oisin McDonagh (yellow card) 73' (yellow-red card)	Stadium: Espace Oceane; Referee: Klym Zabroda (Ukraine)

== Players ==
=== Current squad ===
Players born on or after 1 January 2008 are eligible for the 2027 UEFA European Under-19 Championship qualification campaign.

The following players were called up for the 2027 UEFA European Under-19 Championship qualification Round 2 matches against Greece, France & Norway on 11, 14 & 17 November 2026 respectively.

Caps and goals updated as of 18 November 2026, after the game vs Norway.

No.	Pos.	Player	Date of birth (age)	Caps	Goals	Club
1	GK	Alex Noonan	15 July 2008 (age 18)	8	0	(The Football Association) Ipswich Town
16	GK	Luke Cullen	10 December 2008 (age 17)	2	0	(Football Association of Ireland) St Patrick's Athletic
2	DF	Ryan Butler	15 January 2008 (age 18)	7	0	(Football Association of Ireland) Wexford
3	DF	Ade Solanke	9 January 2008 (age 18)	9	0	(The Football Association) Bournemouth
4	DF	Oisin McDonagh	27 June 2008 (age 18)	8	1	(The Football Association) Queens Park Rangers
5	DF	Sean Murphy	14 April 2008 (age 18)	9	0	(Football Association of Ireland) Shamrock Rovers
6	DF	Finn Sherlock (Captain)	4 July 2008 (age 18)	9	0	(German Football Association) 1899 Hoffenheim
13	DF	Vinnie Leonard	21 March 2008 (age 18)	1	2	(The Football Association) Norwich City
15	DF	Billy Canny	28 May 2008 (age 18)	4	0	(Football Association of Ireland) St Patrick's Athletic
20	DF	Josh Cullen	30 March 2008 (age 18)	8	1	(Football Association of Ireland) Finn Harps
7	MF	Rafe McCormack	14 December 2008 (age 17)	6	0	(The Football Association) Manchester United
8	MF	Gavin McAteer	2 July 2008 (age 18)	9	2	(Football Association of Ireland) Finn Harps
14	MF	Christopher Atherton	19 October 2008 (age 18)	7	0	(The Football Association) Ipswich Town
12	MF	Muhammad Oladiti	25 March 2008 (age 18)	9	0	(The Football Association) Fleetwood Town
17	MF	Goodness Ogbonna	2 January 2008 (age 18)	8	0	(Football Association of Ireland) UCD
9	FW	Michael Noonan	31 July 2008 (age 18)	6	1	(Football Association of Ireland) Shamrock Rovers
10	FW	Billy O'Neill	12 March 2008 (age 18)	7	2	(The Football Association) Bristol City
11	FW	Charles Akinrintayo	6 June 2008 (age 18)	9	2	(Football Association of Ireland) UCD
18	FW	Max Kovalevskis	9 February 2008 (age 18)	6	0	(Football Association of Ireland) Shamrock Rovers
19	FW	Billy Hayes	6 June 2008 (age 18)	1	0	(Football Association of Ireland) St Patrick's Athletic

Players in Bold have been capped at senior level

=== Recent call-ups ===
The following players have also been called up to the Republic of Ireland under-19 squad and remain eligible:

Pos.	Player	Date of birth (age)	Caps	Goals	Club	Latest call-up
GK	Corey Sheridan	6 June 2008 (age 18)	0	0	(Republic of Ireland) Finn Harps	v. Poland, 25 March 2026^{INJ}
MF	Ramón Martos	20 May 2008 (age 18)	7	2	(Spain) Almería	v. Slovenia, 3 October 2026
MF	Alex Flynn	19 July 2008 (age 18)	4	0	(Republic of Ireland) Shelbourne	v. Slovenia, 3 October 2026
MF	Jay McEvoy	16 October 2008 (age 18)	2	0	(England) Manchester United	v. England, 25 September 2026^{WD}
MF	Rory Finneran^{U21}	29 February 2008 (age 18)	3	1	(England) Notts County	v. Italy, 31 March 2026
MF	Grady McDonnell^{U21}	17 February 2008 (age 18)	3	0	(England) Nottingham Forest	v. Italy, 31 March 2026
MF	Daire Patton	15 January 2008 (age 18)	1	0	(Republic of Ireland) Sligo Rovers	v. Iceland, 19 November 2024
FW	Brody Lee	31 July 2008 (age 18)	2	0	(Republic of Ireland) Cork City	v. Greece, 11 November 2026^{INJ}
FW	Cillian Tollett	9 February 2008 (age 18)	5	3	(Italy) Bologna	v. Slovenia, 3 October 2026
FW	Sam Rooney	24 November 2008 (age 17)	3	0	(Republic of Ireland) St Patrick's Athletic	v. Slovenia, 3 October 2026
FW	Kian McMahon-Brown^{U21}	3 August 2008 (age 18)	3	2	(England) Shrewsbury Town	v. Italy, 31 March 2026
FW	Shay Reid	18 July 2008 (age 18)	1	0	(England) Preston North End	v. France, 9 September 2025
^{U21} With U21 squad^{INJ} Withdrew from latest squad due to injury^{WD} Withdrew from latest squad^{SUS} Player is suspended

Note: Names in italics denote players that have been capped for the senior team.

=== Coaching staff ===
Head Coaches
Name	Tenure
Brian Kerr	1997–2003
Sean McCaffrey	2003–2010
Paul Doolin	2010–2016
Tom Mohan	2016–2026
Noel Hunt	2026–

== Head-to-head record ==
The following table shows Republic of Ireland's head-to-head record in the FIFA U-20 World Cup.

Opponent	Pld	W	D	L	GF	GA	GD	Win %
Argentina	2	0	1	1	2	3	−1	0.00
Australia	1	1	0	0	4	0	+4	100.00
Brazil	1	0	0	1	1	2	−1	0.00
China	1	0	1	0	1	1	+0	0.00
Colombia	1	0	0	1	2	3	−1	0.00
Ghana	2	1	0	1	3	3	+0	50.00
Ivory Coast	1	0	1	0	2	2	+0	0.00
Korea	1	0	1	0	1	1	+0	0.00
Mexico	2	1	0	1	2	1	+1	50.00
Morocco	1	1	0	0	2	1	+1	100.00
Nigeria	1	0	1	0	1	1	+0	0.00
Portugal	1	0	0	1	0	2	−2	0.00
Saudi Arabia	3	2	0	1	4	2	+2	66.67
Spain	2	1	0	1	3	4	−1	50.00
United States	1	1	0	0	2	1	+1	100.00
Total	21	8	5	8	30	27	+3	38.10

== Records ==
- Top Goals: Sam Byrne & Adam Rooney 11 Goals
- Youngest Goal Scorer: Sean Moore – 16 years 7 months 6 days vs Faroe Islands (2023)
- Biggest Win: 13-0 vs Gibraltar (2019)
- Biggest Defeat: 0-5 vs Spain (2011)
- Youngest Player: Sam Curtis – 15 years 11 months 10 days vs Montenegro (2021)

== See also ==
- European Under-19 Football Championship
- Republic of Ireland men's national football team
- Republic of Ireland men's national under-21 football team
- Republic of Ireland men's national under-17 football team
- Republic of Ireland women's national football team
- Republic of Ireland women's national under-19 football team
- Republic of Ireland women's national under-17 football team
