= 1955 UEFA European Under-18 Championship =

Tournament details
- Host country: Italy
- Dates: 6–11 April
- Teams: 19

The UEFA European Under-18 Championship 1955 Final Tournament was held in Italy. During this edition, only group matches were played and no winner was declared. This was done to prevent an excess of competition. Romania, Italy, Bulgaria, Hungary and Czechoslovakia were the five group winners.

== Teams ==
The following teams entered the tournament:

- Austria
- Belgium
- Bulgaria
- Czechoslovakia
- England
- France
- West Germany
- Hungary
- Italy (host)
- Luxembourg
- Northern Ireland
- Poland
- Portugal
- Romania
- Saar
- Spain
- Switzerland
- Turkey
- Yugoslavia

== Group A ==
Teams	Pld	W	D	L	GF	GA	GD	Pts
Romania	3	2	1	0	3	1	+2	5
Austria	3	2	0	1	7	3	+4	4
France	3	1	0	2	4	6	–2	2
Belgium	3	0	1	2	1	5	–4	1

6 April	Stadio Artemio Franchi, Florence	Austria	2–0	Belgium
	Stadio Porta Elisa, Lucca	Romania	1–0	France
8 April	Stadio Artemio Franchi, Florence	Austria	5–2	France
	Stadio Armando Picchi, Livorno	Romania	1–1	Belgium
10 April	Stadio Artemio Franchi, Siena	Romania	1–0	Austria
	Arena Garibaldi – Stadio Romeo Anconetani, Pisa	France	2–0	Belgium

== Group B ==
Teams	Pld	W	D	L	GF	GA	GD	Pts
Italy	2	2	0	0	4	0	+4	4
West Germany	2	0	1	1	0	1	–1	1
Portugal	2	0	1	1	0	3	–3	1

7 April	Stadio Armando Picchi, Livorno	Italy	3–0	Portugal
9 April	Arena Garibaldi – Stadio Romeo Anconetani, Pisa	West Germany	0–0	Portugal
11 April	Stadio Artemio Franchi, Florence	Italy	1–0	West Germany

== Group C ==
Teams	Pld	W	D	L	GF	GA	GD	Pts
Bulgaria	3	2	1	0	13	4	+9	5
Spain	3	2	1	0	8	3	+5	5
Poland	3	0	1	2	3	10	–7	1
Northern Ireland	3	0	1	2	2	9	–7	1

7 April	Stadio Artemio Franchi, Florence	Spain	2–2	Bulgaria
	Arena Garibaldi – Stadio Romeo Anconetani, Pisa	Northern Ireland	1–1	Poland
9 April	Stadio Artemio Franchi, Siena	Bulgaria	5–1	Northern Ireland
	Stadio Porta Elisa, Lucca	Spain	3–1	Poland
11 April	Stadio Lungobisenzio, Prato	Bulgaria	6–1	Poland
	Stadio Armando Picchi, Livorno	Spain	3–0	Northern Ireland

== Group D ==
Teams	Pld	W	D	L	GF	GA	GD	Pts
Hungary	3	3	0	0	10	1	+9	6
Yugoslavia	3	2	0	1	8	2	+6	4
Turkey	3	1	0	2	4	6	–2	2
Luxembourg	3	0	0	3	3	16	–13	0

6 April 1955

Yugoslavia	1 – 0	Turkey
Zuban 26'	Report

Stadio Armando Picchi, Livorno
Attendance: 500
Referee: Antonio Clemente (Italy)
6 April 1955

Hungary	5 – 1	Luxembourg
Péter Ilku; László Jagodics; Povázsai; Lenkei		Schaack

Stadio Lungobisenzio, Prato
Attendance: 3,000
Referee: Giannini (Italy)
8 April 1955

Yugoslavia	7 – 0	Luxembourg
Ivan Popović; Čedomir Sentin; Đorđe Mugoša; Zuban

Arena Garibaldi, Pisa
Referee: ? (Italy)
8 April 1955

Hungary	3 – 0	Turkey
Keresztes 21', 51'; Lenkei 35'	Report

Stadio Artemio Franchi, Siena
Referee: Pierino Guidi (Italy)
10 April 1955

Hungary	2 – 0	Yugoslavia
Péter Ilku 9', 15'

Stadio Artemio Franchi, Florence
Attendance: 7.000
Referee: ? (Italy)
10 April 1955

Turkey	4 – 2	Luxembourg
Öztuna 27'; Coşkun Dağlıoğlu 32'; Şehmuz Eraslan 60'; Erol Topoyan 67'	Report	Jacques Hass 6'; René Becker 47' (pen.)

Stadio Porta Elisa, Lucca
Attendance: 200
Referee: ? (Italy)

== Group E ==
Teams	Pld	W	D	L	GF	GA	GD	Pts
Czechoslovakia	3	3	0	0	6	2	+4	6
England	3	1	1	1	3	2	+1	3
Saar	3	1	0	2	4	6	–2	2
Switzerland	3	0	1	2	3	6	–3	1

7 April	Stadio Porta Elisa, Lucca	Czechoslovakia	1–0	England
	Stadio Artemio Franchi, Siena	Saar	3–1	Switzerland
9 April	Stadio Lungobisenzio, Prato	England	3–1	Saar
	Stadio Armando Picchi, Livorno	Czechoslovakia	3–2	Switzerland
11 April	Stadio Artemio Franchi, Florence	England	0–0	Switzerland
	Stadio Carlo Castellani, Empoli	Czechoslovakia	2–0	Saar
