= 1976 UEFA European Under-18 Championship =

Tournament details
- Host country: Hungary
- Dates: 28 May – 6 June
- Teams: 16

Final positions
- Champions: Soviet Union (3rd title)
- Runners-up: Hungary
- Third place: Spain
- Fourth place: France

The UEFA European Under-18 Championship 1976 Final Tournament was held in Hungary. It also served as the European qualification for the 1977 FIFA World Youth Championship.

== Qualification ==
Team 1	Agg.	Team 2	1st leg	2nd leg
Republic of Ireland	0–1	Netherlands	0–0	0–1
Wales	(a)3–3	England	0–1	3–2
Luxembourg	0–2	Iceland	0–1	0–1
Northern Ireland	w.o.	Scotland		
Denmark	3–1	Poland	1–1	2–0
East Germany	1–3	Soviet Union	1–1	0–2
Norway	1–3	Finland	0–2	1–1
Sweden	1–1(a)	West Germany	1–1	0–0
Belgium	2–4	Italy	2–2	0–2
Switzerland	(a)1–1	Portugal	0–0	1–1
Malta	1–4	France	1–3	0–1
Liechtenstein	1–9	Spain	1–5	0–4
Romania	2–4	Czechoslovakia	1–1	1–3
Yugoslavia	4–4 (6-5p)	Bulgaria	2–2	2–2
Austria	1–2	Turkey	1–1	0–1

== Teams ==
The following teams qualified for the tournament:

- Czechoslovakia
- Denmark
- Finland
- France
- West Germany
- Hungary (host)
- Iceland
- Italy
- Netherlands
- Northern Ireland
- Soviet Union
- Spain
- Switzerland
- Turkey
- Wales
- Yugoslavia

== Group stage ==
=== Group A ===
Teams	Pld	W	D	L	GF	GA	GD	Pts
Hungary	3	2	0	1	6	5	+1	4
Wales	3	2	0	1	3	2	+1	4
Yugoslavia	3	1	0	2	6	7	–1	2
Italy	3	1	0	2	3	4	–1	2

28 May	Wales	2–1	Yugoslavia
	Hungary	2–1	Italy
30 May	Italy	2–1	Yugoslavia
	Hungary	1–0	Wales
1 June	Yugoslavia	4–3	Hungary
	Wales	1–0	Italy

=== Group B ===
Teams	Pld	W	D	L	GF	GA	GD	Pts
Spain	3	2	1	0	5	0	+5	5
Switzerland	3	1	2	0	1	0	+1	4
Iceland	3	0	2	1	0	3	–3	2
Turkey	3	0	1	2	0	3	–3	1

28 May	Spain	2–0	Turkey
	Switzerland	0–0	Iceland
30 May	Turkey	0–0	Iceland
	Spain	0–0	Switzerland
1 June	Spain	3–0	Iceland
	Switzerland	1–0	Turkey

=== Group C ===
Teams	Pld	W	D	L	GF	GA	GD	Pts
France	3	2	1	0	5	1	+4	5
West Germany	3	2	0	1	5	6	–1	4
Czechoslovakia	3	1	0	2	4	5	–1	2
Finland	3	0	1	2	1	3	–2	1

28 May	West Germany	2–1	Finland
	France	2–1	Czechoslovakia
30 May	France	3–0	West Germany
	Czechoslovakia	1–0	Finland
1 June	West Germany	3–2	Czechoslovakia
	France	0–0	Finland

=== Group D ===
Teams	Pld	W	D	L	GF	GA	GD	Pts
Soviet Union	3	3	0	0	8	0	+8	6
Denmark	3	2	0	1	8	7	+1	4
Netherlands	3	1	0	2	4	6	–2	2
Northern Ireland	3	0	0	3	3	10	–7	0

28 May	Soviet Union	3–0	Netherlands
	Denmark	5–3	Northern Ireland
30 May	Netherlands	3–0	Northern Ireland
	Soviet Union	3–0	Denmark
1 June	Denmark	3–1	Netherlands
	Soviet Union	2–0	Northern Ireland

== Semifinals ==
4 June 1976

Hungary	1 – 1	France
Penalties
	4 – 3

Budapest
4 June 1976

Soviet Union	3 – 0	Spain

Budapest

== Third place match ==
6 June 1976

Spain	3 – 0	France

Budapest

== Final ==
6 June 1976

Soviet Union	1 – 0	Hungary

Budapest

1976 UEFA European Under-18 Championship

Soviet Union
Third title

== Qualification to World Youth Championship ==
The following teams qualified for the 1977 FIFA World Youth Championship:
Semifinalists:

- France
- Hungary
- Soviet Union
- Spain

Qualification unclear:

- Austria
- Italy
