= 1975 UEFA European Under-18 Championship =

U-18-Fußball-Europameisterschaft 1975 Championnat d'Europe de football des moins de 18 ans 1975 Campionato di calcio europeo Under-18 1975 Campiunadis Europeans da ballape U18 1975

Tournament details
- Host country: Switzerland
- Dates: 9–19 May
- Teams: 16

Final positions
- Champions: England (7th title)
- Runners-up: Finland
- Third place: Hungary
- Fourth place: Turkey

The UEFA European Under-18 Championship 1975 Final Tournament was held in Switzerland.

== Qualification ==
Team 1	Agg.	Team 2	1st leg	2nd leg
Yugoslavia	0–4	East Germany	0–2	0–2
West Germany	3–2	Austria	3–1	0–1
England	2–1	Spain	1–1	1–0
Belgium	0–1	Republic of Ireland	0–1	0–0
Bulgaria	1–2	Hungary	0–1	1–1
Denmark	2–1	Scotland	0–0	2–1
Norway	0–1	Finland	0–0	0–1
Iceland	2–5	Northern Ireland	1–2	1–3
Italy	5–2	Portugal	3–1	2–1
Wales	4–1	Malta	4–0	0–1
Sweden	2–4	Poland	1–2	1–2
Romania	1–1(a)	Soviet Union	1–1	0–0
Czechoslovakia	2–3	Turkey	2–1	0–2
Netherlands	0–1	France	0–0	0–1
Liechtenstein	1–6	Luxembourg	1–2	0–4

== Teams ==
The following teams qualified for the tournament:

- Denmark
- East Germany
- England
- Finland
- France
- West Germany
- Hungary
- Italy
- Luxembourg
- Northern Ireland
- Poland
- Republic of Ireland
- Soviet Union
- Switzerland (host)
- Turkey
- Wales

== Group stage ==
=== Group A ===
Teams	Pld	W	D	L	GF	GA	GD	Pts
Turkey	3	1	2	0	5	3	+2	4
Denmark	3	1	2	0	6	5	+1	4
France	3	1	1	1	10	4	+6	3
Luxembourg	3	0	1	2	1	10	–9	1

9 May 1975

Luxembourg	1 – 1	Denmark
Adrien Koster 80' (pen.)		26' (pen.) Arnesen

Stade de Copet, Vevey
9 May 1975

France	1 – 1	Turkey
Zénier 70'	Report	72' Bülent Taşkın

Stade Olympique de la Pontaise, Lausanne
Attendance: 3,000
Referee: Siegfried Kirschen (East Germany)
11 May 1975

France	7 – 0	Luxembourg
Baronchelli 1', 35', 55'; Larios 21'; Tusseau 47'; Beinardet 69'; Jean-Louis Bassi 72'

Stade Municipal, Yverdon
11 May 1975

Denmark	2 – 2	Turkey
Berggreen 64' (pen.); Lennart Simonsen 76'	Report	15' Bilgetay; 28' Bülent Taşkın

Montreux
Referee: Bruno Della Bruna (Switzerland)
13 May 1975

Turkey	2 – 0	Luxembourg
Yaşar 24'; Çetiner 46'	Report

Stade de Copet, Vevey
Referee: Anatoliy Milchenko (Soviet Union)
13 May 1975

Denmark	3 – 2	France
Tom Jensen 14' (pen.); Thychosen 17' (pen.); Berggreen 53'		49' Zénier; 56' Van Straelen

Stade Olympique de la Pontaise, Lausanne

=== Group B ===
Teams	Pld	W	D	L	GF	GA	GD	Pts
England	3	3	0	0	8	0	+8	6
Northern Ireland	3	1	1	1	3	4	–1	3
Republic of Ireland	3	1	0	2	3	3	0	2
Switzerland	3	0	1	2	1	8	–7	1

9 May	Northern Ireland	1–1	Switzerland
	England	1–0	Republic of Ireland
11 May	Northern Ireland	2–0	Republic of Ireland
	England	4–0	Switzerland
13 May	England	3–0	Northern Ireland
	Republic of Ireland	3–0	Switzerland

=== Group C ===
Teams	Pld	W	D	L	GF	GA	GD	Pts
Finland	3	1	2	0	3	2	+1	4
East Germany	3	1	1	1	3	4	–1	3
West Germany	3	1	1	1	4	6	–2	3
Soviet Union	3	1	0	2	4	2	+2	2

9 May	West Germany	3–1	East Germany
	Finland	1–0	Soviet Union
11 May	East Germany	1–0	Soviet Union
	West Germany	1–1	Finland
13 May	Finland	1–1	East Germany
	Soviet Union	4–0	West Germany

=== Group D ===
Teams	Pld	W	D	L	GF	GA	GD	Pts
Hungary	3	2	0	1	6	1	+5	4
Wales	3	1	1	1	3	4	–1	3
Italy	3	1	1	1	1	2	–1	3
Poland	3	1	0	2	1	4	–3	2

9 May	Poland	1–0	Hungary
	Wales	0–0	Italy
11 May	Hungary	4–0	Wales
	Italy	1–0	Poland
13 May	Hungary	2–0	Italy
	Wales	3–0	Poland

== Semifinals ==
16 May 1975

Finland	1 – 0	Turkey
Koskinen 47'	Report

Stade de Bouleyres, Bulle
Referee: Giulio Ciacci (Italy)
16 May 1975

England	3 – 1	Hungary
Bertschin 3'; Sparrow 5', 51'		55' Bodonyi

Olten

== Third place match ==
19 May 1975

Hungary	2 – 2	Turkey
Kiss 13'; Májer 66'	Report	4' Çetiner; 46' Koç
Penalties
	5 – 4

Wankdorf Stadion, Bern
Referee: René Mathieu (Switzerland)

== Final ==
19 May 1975

England	1 – 0 (gg)	Finland
Wilkins 96'

Wankdorf Stadion, Bern

1975 UEFA European Under-18 Championship

England
Seventh title
