= 1953 FIFA Youth Tournament Under-18 =

Tournament details
- Host country: Belgium
- Dates: 31 March – 6 April
- Teams: 16

Final positions
- Champions: Hungary (1st title)
- Runners-up: Yugoslavia
- Third place: Turkey
- Fourth place: Spain

Tournament statistics
- Matches played: 32

The FIFA Youth Tournament Under-18 1953 Final Tournament was held in Belgium. Argentina was the first non-European team that entered.

== Teams ==
The following teams entered the tournament:

- Argentina (invited)
- Austria
- Belgium (host)
- England
- France
- West Germany
- Hungary
- Luxembourg
- Netherlands
- Northern Ireland
- Republic of Ireland
- Saar
- Spain
- Switzerland
- Turkey
- Yugoslavia

== First round ==
31 March 1953

England	2 – 0	Belgium

Brussels
31 March 1953

West Germany	3 – 2	Argentina

Liège
31 March 1953

Hungary	4 – 0	Switzerland

Ghent
31 March 1953

Republic of Ireland	1 – 0	Netherlands

Antwerp
31 March 1953

Luxembourg	4 – 3	Austria

Namur
31 March 1953

Spain	5 – 0	Saar

Mechelen
31 March 1953

Turkey	1 – 0	France
Kaçmaz 25'	Report

Kortrijk
31 March 1953

Yugoslavia	5 – 1	Northern Ireland

Bruges

== Quarterfinals ==
=== Places 9-16 ===
2 April 1953

France	2 – 1	Austria

Nivelles
2 April 1953

Netherlands	2 – 1	Switzerland

Halle
2 April 1953

Belgium	4 – 3	Northern Ireland

Aalst
2 April 1953

Argentina	7 – 0	Saar

Lier

=== Places 1-8 ===
2 April 1953

Hungary	4 – 0	Republic of Ireland

Brussels
2 April 1953

Spain	5 – 1	West Germany

Antwerp
2 April 1953

Turkey	3 – 0	Luxembourg
Taş 5'; Ertuğ 43'; Elma 47'	Report

Mons
2 April 1953

Yugoslavia	(c) 1 – 1 (aet)	England

Liège

== Semifinals ==
=== Places 13-16 ===
4 April 1953

Switzerland	3 – 1	Austria

Diest
4 April 1953

Saar	6 – 5	Northern Ireland

Brussels

=== Places 9-12 ===
4 April 1953

Netherlands	3 – 0	France

Tienen
4 April 1953

Argentina	4 – 1	Belgium

Termonde

=== Places 5-8 ===
4 April 1953

England	3 – 1	West Germany

Boom
4 April 1953

Republic of Ireland	3 – 2	Luxembourg

Mechelen

=== Places 1-4 ===
4 April 1953

Hungary	2 – 0	Turkey
Karácsonyi 31' (pen.), 80' (pen.)	Report

Brussels
Attendance: 6,000
4 April 1953

Yugoslavia	3 – 1	Spain

Verviers

== Final Matches ==
=== Fifteenth Place Match ===
5 April 1953

Northern Ireland	2 – 1	Austria

Brussels

=== Thirteenth Place Match ===
5 April 1953

Switzerland	2 – 2 Saar refused to play Extra Time	Saar

Vilvoorde

=== Eleventh Place Match ===
5 April 1953

Belgium	4 – 3	France

Brussels

=== Ninth Place Match ===
5 April 1953

Argentina	3 – 1	Netherlands

Brussels

=== Seventh-place match ===
5 April 1953

Luxembourg	3 – 2	West Germany

Ronse

=== Fifth-place match ===
5 April 1953

England	2 – 0	Republic of Ireland

Leuven

=== Third place match ===
6 April 1953

Turkey	3 – 2	Spain
Elma 28', 66'; Taş 70'	Report	Merodio 16'; Aniando 25'

Heysel Stadium, Brussels
Attendance: 10,000

== Final ==
6 April 1953

Hungary	2 – 0	Yugoslavia

Brussels

1953 FIFA Youth Tournament Under-18

Hungary
First title
