= 1979 UEFA European Under-18 Championship =

Tournament details
- Host country: Austria
- Dates: 24 May – 2 June
- Teams: 16

Final positions
- Champions: Yugoslavia (2nd title)
- Runners-up: Bulgaria
- Third place: England
- Fourth place: France

Tournament statistics
- Top scorer(s): (Socialist Federal Republic of Yugoslavia) Senad Merdanović (4 goals)

The UEFA European Under-18 Championship 1979 Final Tournament was held in Austria.

== Qualification ==
=== Group 2 ===
Teams	Pld	W	D	L	GF	GA	GD	Pts
Belgium	4	2	1	1	2	1	+1	5
Republic of Ireland	4	2	0	2	6	5	+1	4
Northern Ireland	4	1	1	2	4	6	–2	3

Republic of Ireland	0–1	Belgium
Northern Ireland	1–2	Republic of Ireland
Belgium	0–0	Northern Ireland
Belgium	1–0	Republic of Ireland
Republic of Ireland	4–2	Northern Ireland
Northern Ireland	1–0	Belgium

=== Group 12 ===
Teams	Pld	W	D	L	GF	GA	GD	Pts
Hungary	4	2	1	1	5	5	0	5
Soviet Union	4	1	2	1	6	4	+2	4
Romania	4	1	1	2	5	7	–2	3

Hungary	0–0	Soviet Union
Romania	0–3	Hungary
Soviet Union	4–0	Hungary
Hungary	2–1	Romania
Romania	3–1	Soviet Union
Soviet Union	1–1	Romania

=== Other groups ===
Team 1	Agg.	Team 2	1st leg	2nd leg
Norway	4–1	Wales	2–1	2–0
Iceland	0–2	Netherlands	0–1	0–1
Finland	0–5	Scotland	0–3	0–2
Sweden	1–4	Denmark	0–0	1–4
Spain	3–4	France	3–1	0–3
Malta	6–0	Liechtenstein	3–0	3–0
Italy	0–3	England	0–1	0–2
Luxembourg	2–8	West Germany	1–4	1–4
Portugal	3–3(a)	Switzerland	2–2	1–1
Cyprus	0–4	Yugoslavia	0–3	0–1
Poland	5–1	Turkey	5–0	0–1
Greece	1–3	Czechoslovakia	1–0	0–3
East Germany	2–2 (5–6p)	Bulgaria	1–1	1–1

== Teams ==
The following teams qualified for the tournament:

- Austria (host)
- Belgium
- Bulgaria
- Czechoslovakia
- Denmark
- England
- France
- West Germany
- Hungary
- Malta
- Netherlands
- Norway
- Poland
- Scotland
- Switzerland
- Yugoslavia

== Group stage ==
=== Group A ===
Teams	Pld	W	D	L	GF	GA	GD	Pts
France	3	2	1	0	8	3	+5	5
Belgium	3	2	0	1	7	7	0	4
Netherlands	3	1	0	2	4	5	–1	2
Switzerland	3	0	1	2	3	7	–4	1

24 May	France	5–1	Belgium
	Netherlands	2–1	Switzerland
26 May	France	1–1	Switzerland
	Belgium	2–1	Netherlands
28 May	France	2–1	Netherlands
	Belgium	4–1	Switzerland

=== Group B ===
Teams	Pld	W	D	L	GF	GA	GD	Pts
England	3	3	0	0	8	0	+8	6
Czechoslovakia	3	2	0	1	8	3	+5	4
West Germany	3	1	0	2	5	4	+1	2
Malta	3	0	0	3	0	14	–14	0

24 May	West Germany	5–0	Malta
	England	3–0	Czechoslovakia
26 May	England	3–0	Malta
	Czechoslovakia	2–0	West Germany
28 May	England	2–0	West Germany
	Czechoslovakia	6–0	Malta

=== Group C ===
Teams	Pld	W	D	L	GF	GA	GD	Pts
Yugoslavia	3	3	0	0	7	2	+5	6
Hungary	3	2	0	1	5	3	+2	4
Austria	3	1	0	2	3	5	–2	2
Norway	3	0	0	3	2	7	–5	0

24 May	Austria	2–0	Norway
	Yugoslavia	2–0	Hungary
26 May	Yugoslavia	2–1	Austria
	Hungary	2–1	Norway
28 May	Yugoslavia	3–1	Norway
	Hungary	3–0	Austria

=== Group D ===
Teams	Pld	W	D	L	GF	GA	GD	Pts
Bulgaria	3	3	0	0	7	1	+6	6
Scotland	3	2	0	1	5	5	0	4
Denmark	3	1	0	2	3	4	–1	2
Poland	3	0	0	3	4	9	–5	0

24 May	Scotland	3–2	Poland
	Bulgaria	1–0	Denmark
26 May	Denmark	2–1	Poland
	Bulgaria	2–0	Scotland
28 May	Bulgaria	4–1	Poland
	Scotland	2–1	Denmark

== Semifinals ==
31 May 1979

Bulgaria	1 – 0	England

Vienna
31 May 1979

Yugoslavia	3 – 0	France

Vienna

== Third place match ==
2 June 1979

England	0 – 0	France
Penalties
	4 – 3

Vienna

== Final ==
2 June 1979

Yugoslavia	1 – 0	Bulgaria

Vienna

1979 UEFA European Under-18 Championship

Yugoslavia
Second title
