= Josip Duvančić =

Yugoslav football manager and player

Personal information
- Full name: Josip Duvančić
- Date of birth: 1 October 1935
- Place of birth: Drniš, Kingdom of Yugoslavia
- Date of death: 17 April 2023 (aged 87)
- Place of death: Zemun, Serbia
- Height: 1.76 m (5 ft 9 in)
- Position: Forward

Youth career
- Partizan

Senior career*
Years	Team	Apps	(Gls)
1956–1958	Partizan	18	(2)
1959–1960	Vojvodina	19	(2)
1960–1966	Sloboda Tuzla	89	(27)
1967–1968	İzmirspor	51	(8)
Total		177	(39)

International career
1953	Yugoslavia U18	3	(0)

Managerial career
- 1969–1970: Sloboda Tuzla (assistant)
- 1970–1976: Sloboda Tuzla
- 1976–1977: Hajduk Split
- 1977–1979: Radnički Niš
- 1979–1980: Partizan
- 1980–1983: Osijek
- 1983–1984: Vojvodina
- 1984: Budućnost Titograd
- 1985: Napredak Kruševac
- 1985–1986: Radnički Niš
- 1986–1987: Sarıyer
- 1987–1988: Priština
- 1988: Sloboda Tuzla
- 1990: Napredak Kruševac
- 1993–1994: Radnički Beograd
- 1995: Radnički Niš
- 1996: Železnik
- 1998: Spartak Subotica
Medal record
Silver medal – second place	FIFA Youth Tournament Under-18	1953
- * Club domestic league appearances and goals

Josip "Mićo" Duvančić (Serbian Cyrillic: Јосип Дуванчић; 1 October 1935 – 17 April 2023) was a Yugoslav football manager and player.

== Club career ==
Born in Razvođe, a village near Drniš, Duvančić spent two seasons with Partizan from 1956 to 1958, making 18 league appearances and scoring two times. He also helped the club win the Yugoslav Cup in 1957, contributing with two goals in the process.

After a stint with Vojvodina, Duvančić joined Yugoslav Second League side Sloboda Tuzla in 1960. He helped the club win promotion to the Yugoslav First League in 1962. Before retiring, Duvančić also played abroad for İzmirspor in Turkey.

== International career ==
At international level, Duvančić represented Yugoslavia in the 1953 FIFA Youth Tournament Under-18, finishing as runners-up to Hungary.

== Managerial career ==
After hanging up his boots, Duvančić acted as an assistant to Sloboda Tuzla manager Dušan Varagić and later Munib Saračević. He replaced Saračević as manager in November 1970, managing to save the club from relegation and reaching the Yugoslav Cup final that season. In 1976, Duvančić left the position and took charge of Hajduk Split, going on to win the 1976–77 Yugoslav Cup.

In the summer of 1979, Duvančić was appointed as manager of Partizan, finishing the season in 13th place. He subsequently led three more Yugoslav First League clubs, namely Osijek, Vojvodina, and Budućnost Titograd.

In the 1986–87 season, Duvančić served as manager of Sarıyer in Turkey. He subsequently returned to his homeland and managed Priština during the 1987–88 Yugoslav First League, as the club eventually suffered relegation.

== Honours ==
=== Player ===
Partizan

- Yugoslav Cup: 1956–57

=== Manager ===
Hajduk Split

- Yugoslav Cup: 1976–77
