= 1954 FIFA Youth Tournament Under-18 =

Tournament details
- Host country: West Germany
- Dates: 10–20 April
- Teams: 18

Final positions
- Champions: Spain (2nd title)
- Runners-up: West Germany
- Third place: Argentina
- Fourth place: Turkey

The FIFA Youth Tournament Under-18 1954 Final Tournament was held in West Germany. It was the last time the FIFA was organiser, from next year on, the UEFA would take over.

== Teams ==
The following teams entered the tournament:

- Argentina (invited)
- Austria
- Belgium
- East Germany
- England
- France
- West Germany (host)
- Hungary
- Luxembourg
- Netherlands
- Northern Ireland
- Portugal
- Republic of Ireland
- Saar
- Spain
- Switzerland
- Turkey
- Yugoslavia

== Group stage ==
=== Group 1 ===
Teams	Pld	W	D	L	GF	GA	GD	Pts
Argentina	3	3	0	0	13	1	+12	6
East Germany	3	1	1	1	4	4	0	3
Netherlands	3	0	2	1	3	11	–8	2
France	3	0	1	2	4	8	–4	1

11 April	East Germany	3–1	France
12 April	Argentina	8–0	Netherlands
14 April	Netherlands	2–2	France
	Argentina	2–0	East Germany

15 April 1954

Argentina	3 – 1	France
Julio Nuín 7'; Héctor Molina 32', 43'		65' Bourdoncle

Westkampfbahn, Düren
15 April 1954

Netherlands	1 – 1	East Germany

=== Group 2 ===
Teams	Pld	W	D	L	GF	GA	GD	Pts
Spain	3	3	0	0	11	1	+10	6
Yugoslavia	3	1	1	1	3	4	–1	3
Portugal	3	0	2	1	3	9	–6	2
Republic of Ireland	3	0	1	2	4	7	–3	1

11 April	Spain	2–0	Yugoslavia
	Portugal	2–2	Republic of Ireland
13 April	Spain	3–1	Republic of Ireland
	Yugoslavia	1–1	Portugal
14 April	Spain	6–0	Portugal
	Yugoslavia	2–1	Republic of Ireland

=== Group 3 ===
Teams	Pld	W	D	L	GF	GA	GD	Pts
Turkey	4	3	1	0	7	1	+6	7
Belgium	4	2	1	1	5	7	–2	5
Luxembourg	4	1	2	1	4	4	0	4
Austria	4	1	1	2	8	8	0	3
Switzerland	4	0	1	3	3	7	–4	1

10 April	Belgium	0–0	Luxembourg
	Austria	4–2	Switzerland
11 April	Luxembourg	3–2	Austria
	Turkey	4–0	Belgium
12 April	Turkey	1–0	Switzerland
13 April	Belgium	3–2	Austria
	Luxembourg	0–0	Switzerland
14 April	Turkey	2–1	Luxembourg
15 April	Turkey	0–0	Austria
	Belgium	2–1	Switzerland

=== Group 4 ===
Teams	Pld	W	D	L	GF	GA	GD	Pts
West Germany	4	3	1	0	16	4	+12	7
Hungary	4	3	0	1	16	5	+11	6
England	4	1	2	1	9	6	–3	4
Saar	4	1	1	2	4	14	–10	3
Northern Ireland	4	0	0	4	4	20	–16	0

10 April	Hungary	6–0	Saar
	England	5–0	Northern Ireland
11 April	Hungary	3–1	England
	West Germany	6–1	Saar
12 April	West Germany	6–1	Northern Ireland
13 April	Hungary	7–2	Northern Ireland
	England	1–1	Saar
14 April	West Germany	2–0	Hungary
15 April	England	2–2	West Germany
	Saar	2–1	Northern Ireland

== Semifinals ==
=== Places 13-16 ===
17 April 1954

Saar	2 – 0	Austria

Olpe
17 April 1954

France	2 – 0	Republic of Ireland

Engers

=== Places 9-12 ===
17 April 1954

Luxembourg	2 – 0	England

Bad Neuenahr
17 April 1954

Netherlands	4 – 2	Portugal

Mechernich

=== Places 5-8 ===
17 April 1954

Hungary	3 – 1	Belgium

Köln-Kalk
17 April 1954

Yugoslavia	3 – 1	East Germany

Koblenz

=== Places 1-4 ===
17 April 1954

Spain	1 – 0	Argentina

Wuppertal
17 April 1954

West Germany	2 – 1	Turkey
Habig 41'; Seeler 57'	Report	Erol Topoyan 55'

Gelsenkirchen
Attendance: 40,000

== Final Matches ==
=== Seventeenth Place Match ===
19 April 1954

Switzerland	2 – 0	Northern Ireland

Bad Godesberg

=== Fifteenth Place Match ===
19 April 1954

Austria	3 – 0	Republic of Ireland

Bad Honnef

=== Thirteenth Place Match ===
19 April 1954

Saar	3 – 0	France

Siegburg

=== Eleventh Place Match ===
19 April 1954

Portugal	2 – 0	England

Bonn

=== Ninth Place Match ===
19 April 1954

Luxembourg	5 – 0 Regulatory Score	Netherlands

Bergisch Gladbach

=== Seventh-place match ===
19 April 1954

East Germany	3 – 2	Belgium

Limburg an der Lahn

=== Fifth-place match ===
19 April 1954

Hungary	1 – 0	Yugoslavia

Euskirchen

=== Third place match ===
19 April 1954

Argentina	1 – 0	Turkey

Köln Stadium, Köln

== Final ==
20 April 1954

Spain	2 – 2 (aet) Spain win based on better Goal Average during the group stage.	West Germany
Heliodoro Álvarez; Cela	Report	Seeler

Köln
Attendance: 65,000

1954 FIFA Youth Tournament Under-18

Spain
Second title
