= Claudio Castroni =

Italian footballer (born 1987)

Personal information
- Full name: Claudio Castroni
- Date of birth: 13 January 1987 (age 39)
- Place of birth: Rome, Italy
- Position: Defender

Youth career
- –2006: Lazio

Senior career*
Years	Team	Apps	(Gls)
2006–2007	Taranto	1	(0)
2007–2008	Cassino		
- Tevere Remo

International career
2005	Italy U18	2	(0)
- * Club domestic league appearances and goals as of 17:00, 5 November 2022 (UTC)

Claudio Castroni (born 13 January 1987) is an Italian former professional footballer who played as a defender.

== Club career ==
Castroni started his career in the youth academy of Lazio, but left the club in 2006 without making a single first team appearance.

He signed for Taranto following his departure from Stadio Olimpico. He made league one appearance for the club in a 2–1 defeat to Avellino on 13 May 2007.

In 2008, he had a trial with Scottish side Livingston but was not offered a permanent contract.

The Italian signed for Tevere Remo and was part of the side that won promotion to Serie C2 in 2015.

== International career ==
Castroni made two appearances for Italy U18 in 2005 against Switzerland and Austria.

== Honours ==
Tevere Remo

- Serie D runner-up: 2014-15
