= Spain national under-18 football team =

Spain Under-18
- Nickname: La Rojita (The Little Red One)
- Association: Royal Spanish Football Federation (Real Federación Española de Fútbol – RFEF)
- Confederation: UEFA (Europe)
- Head coach: Paco Gallardo
- Most caps: Javier Delgado; José Luis Gallardo; Sebastián Nadal (23 each)
- Top scorer: Chuzo (13)
- FIFA code: ESP
First colours	Second colours

First international
- Spain 4–1 England (Barcelona, Spain; 15 April 1952)

Biggest win
- Spain 9–0 Andorra (Cádiz, Spain; 12 March 1999)

Biggest defeat
- Romania 5–1 Spain (Graz, Austria; 20 April 1960); England 5–1 Spain (Walsall, England; 22 July 1993) Records for competitive matches only.

European Under-18 Championship
- Appearances: 14 (first in 1981)
- Best result: Winners (1995)

Spain national under-18 football team
Medal record

U-18 European Championship
Bronze medal – third place	1990 Hungary	Team
Bronze medal – third place	1993 England	Team
Bronze medal – third place	1994 Spain	Team
Gold medal – first place	1995 Greece	Team
Silver medal – second place	1996 France & Luxembourg	Team
Bronze medal – third place	1997 Iceland	Team
Bronze medal – third place	2001 Finland	Team

Spain national under-18 football team
Medal record

UEFA–CAF Meridian Cup
Silver medal – second place	1997 Portugal	Team
Gold medal – first place	1999 South Africa	Team
Gold medal – first place	2001 Italy	Team
Gold medal – first place	2003 Egypt	Team
Bronze medal – third place	2005 Turkey	Team

The Spain national under-18 football team represents Spain in international football at this age level and is controlled by Royal Spanish Football Federation, the governing body for football in Spain.

== Competitive record ==
=== FIFA Youth Tournament Under-18 record ===
Year	Round	GP	W	D*	L	GS	GA
(England) 1948	did not enter						
(Netherlands) 1949	did not enter						
(Austria) 1950	did not enter						
(France) 1951	did not enter						
(Spain) 1952	Champions	2	1	1	0	4	1
(Belgium) 1953	Fourth place	4	2	0	2	13	7
(West Germany) 1954	Champions	5	4	1	0	14	3
Total	3/7	11	7	2	2	31	11

=== UEFA Youth Tournament Under-18 record ===
Year	Round	GP	W	D*	L	GS	GA
(Italy) 1955	Group stage	3	2	1	0	8	3
(Hungary) 1956	did not enter						
(Spain) 1957	Runners-up	5	3	1	1	18	5
(Luxembourg) 1958	Group stage	3	2	1	0	7	4
(Bulgaria) 1959	Group stage	3	2	0	1	10	2
(Austria) 1960	Group stage	3	1	0	2	4	8
(Portugal) 1961	Fourth place	4	1	1	2	10	9
(Romania) 1962	Group stage	3	0	1	2	1	4
(England) 1963	Qualifying round	2	0	1	1	4	5
(Netherlands) 1964	Runners-up	5	4	0	1	10	7
(West Germany) 1965	Group stage	2	0	1	1	2	3
(Socialist Federal Republic of Yugoslavia) 1966	Fourth place	5	2	1	2	6	6
(Turkey) 1967	Group stage	5	1	0	4	6	8
(France) 1968	Qualifying round	2	0	1	1	1	2
(East Germany) 1969	Group stage	3	1	0	2	3	5
(Scotland) 1970	Qualifying round	4	2	0	2	7	10
(Czechoslovakia) 1971	Group stage	3	1	1	1	2	2
(Spain) 1972	Fourth place	5	2	3	0	11	4
(Italy) 1973	Qualifying round	4	1	1	2	7	7
(Sweden) 1974	Group stage	5	2	2	1	3	3
(Switzerland) 1975	Qualifying round	2	0	1	1	1	2
(Hungary) 1976	Third place	7	5	1	1	17	4
(Belgium) 1977	Qualifying round	4	1	2	1	5	3
(Poland) 1978	Group stage	5	3	1	1	7	3
(Austria) 1979	Qualifying round	2	1	0	1	3	4
(East Germany) 1980	Group stage	5	4	0	1	9	2
Total	18/26	94	41	21	32	162	115

=== UEFA European Under-18 Championship record ===
Year	Round	GP	W	D*	L	GS	GA
(West Germany) 1981	Fourth place	7	3	4	0	12	5
(Finland) 1982	Second round	5	1	1	3	7	6
(England) 1983	Second round	5	2	1	2	4	3
(Soviet Union) 1984	Second round	5	2	1	2	7	6
(Socialist Federal Republic of Yugoslavia) 1986	First round	6	2	2	2	7	8
(Czechoslovakia) 1988	Fourth place	9	7	0	2	22	4
(Hungary) 1990	Third place	9	6	1	2	17	9
(Germany) 1992	Qualifying round	6	0	3	3	2	9
(England) 1993	Third place	8	6	1	1	22	12
(Spain) 1994	Third place	4	3	0	1	14	8
(Greece) 1995	Champions	8	7	1	0	24	9
(France) (Luxembourg) 1996	Runners-up	8	4	3	1	12	3
(Iceland) 1997	Third place	8	5	2	1	13	7
(Cyprus) 1998	Group stage	9	7	0	2	18	10
(Sweden) 1999	Group stage	8	3	4	1	20	7
(Germany) 2000	Intermediary round	5	3	1	1	11	2
(Finland) 2001	Third place	8	6	1	1	19	8
Total	14/17	118	67	26	25	231	116

=== UEFA–CAF Meridian Cup record ===
Year	Round	GP	W	D*	L	GS	GA
(Portugal) 1997	Runners-up	5	2	2	1	9	6
(South Africa) 1999	Champions	5	4	1	0	14	3
(Italy) 2001	Champions	4	3	1	0	9	1
(Egypt) 2003	Champions	4	4	0	0	16	1
(Turkey) 2005	Third place	4	4	0	0	9	0
Total	5/5	22	17	4	1	57	11

=== Mediterranean Games ===
Mediterranean Games record
Year	Round	Position	Pld	W	D*	L	GF	GA
(Spain) 2018	Gold medalists	1st	4	4	0	0	11	5
Total	1 Title	1/1	4	4	0	0	11	5

- Denotes draws include knockout matches decided on penalty kicks.
- Gold background color indicates first-place finish. Silver background color indicates second-place finish. Bronze background color indicates third-place finish.
- Red border color indicates tournament was held on home soil.

== Current squad ==
- The following players were called up for as friendly against Italy.
- Match dates: 15 January 2025
- Caps and goals correct as of: 15 January 2025, after the match against Italy

No.	Pos.	Player	Date of birth (age)	Caps	Goals	Club
	GK	Simón García	19 April 2007 (age 19)	3	0	(Royal Spanish Football Federation) Athletic Bilbao
	GK	Eder Aller	4 April 2007 (age 19)	2	0	(Royal Spanish Football Federation) Barcelona
	DF	Davinchi	16 October 2007 (age 19)	4	0	(Royal Spanish Football Federation) Recreativo de Huelva
	DF	Jorge Salinas	2 April 2007 (age 19)	4	0	(Royal Spanish Football Federation) Racing de Santander
	DF	Landry Farré	7 January 2007 (age 19)	3	0	(Royal Spanish Football Federation) Barcelona
	DF	Romeo Hueso	3 April 2007 (age 19)	3	0	(Royal Spanish Football Federation) Atlético Madrid
	DF	Carlos Alós	10 February 2007 (age 19)	3	0	(Royal Spanish Football Federation) Valencia
	DF	Mario Rivas	16 March 2007 (age 19)	1	0	(Royal Spanish Football Federation) Real Madrid
	DF	Jesús Fortea	26 March 2007 (age 19)	1	0	(Royal Spanish Football Federation) Real Madrid
	DF	Jofre Torrents	28 January 2007 (age 19)	0	0	(Royal Spanish Football Federation) Barcelona
	MF	Quim Junyent	25 March 2007 (age 19)	7	1	(Royal Spanish Football Federation) Barcelona
	MF	Xavi Espart	21 May 2007 (age 19)	4	0	(Royal Spanish Football Federation) Barcelona
	MF	Andrés Antañón	1 January 2007 (age 19)	4	0	(Royal Spanish Football Federation) Celta de Vigo
	MF	Juan Hernández	21 July 2007 (age 19)	1	0	(Royal Spanish Football Federation) Barcelona
	MF	Beñat García	21 January 2007 (age 19)	1	0	(Royal Spanish Football Federation) Basconia
	MF	Alex Marchal	17 September 2007 (age 19)	1	0	(Royal Spanish Football Federation) Real Sociedad
	MF	Miguel Lodoño	1 January 2007 (age 19)	0	0	(Royal Spanish Football Federation) Espanyol
	FW	Ousmane Diallo	12 June 2007 (age 19)	4	2	(German Football Association) Borussia Dortmund
	FW	Daniel Yáñez	28 March 2007 (age 19)	4	0	(Royal Spanish Football Federation) Real Madrid
	FW	Adrián Arnu	4 March 2007 (age 19)	4	0	(Royal Spanish Football Federation) Real Valladolid
	FW	David Otorbi	16 October 2007 (age 19)	4	0	(Royal Spanish Football Federation) Valencia
	FW	Sergio Esteban	20 March 2007 (age 19)	1	0	(Royal Spanish Football Federation) Atlético Madrid

=== Recent call-ups ===
The following players have been called up within the last twelve months and are still eligible for selection.

Pos.	Player	Date of birth (age)	Caps	Goals	Club	Latest call-up

== Player records ==
=== Top appearances ===
Rank	Player	Club(s)	Year(s)	U-18 caps
1	Javier Delgado	Damm	1988–1990	23
1	José Luis Gallardo	Espanyol	1988–1990	23
1	Sebastián Nadal	Mallorca, Atlético Madrid	1979–1982	23
2	Luis Cuartero	Zaragoza	1993–1994	22
2	Mario Rosas	Barcelona	1996–1999	22
3	Juan Luis Bernal	Betis	1989–1991	21
3	Gonzalo Colsa	Racing de Santander	1996–1998	21
3	Gerardo García	Real Madrid	1991–1993	21
3	Míchel	Real Madrid	1980–1981	21
3	Javier López	Osasuna	1991–1994	21
3	Luis Márquez	Betis	1988–1990	21

Note: Club(s) represents the permanent clubs during the player's time in the Under-18s.

=== Top goalscorers ===
Rank	Player	Club(s)	Year(s)	U-18 goals
1	Chuzo	Atlético Madrid	1957–1958	13
2	Albert Aguilà	Real Madrid	1987–1988	12 Wellington phoenix
4	Javi Moreno	Barcelona	1992–1993	10
4	Fernando Morientes	Albacete	1993–1994	10
5	Jorge Perona	Barcelona	2000–2001	9
6	Abel Ruiz	Barcelona	2018	7
6	Carlitos	Sevilla	1994–1995	7
6	Pepe Gálvez	Mallorca	1991–1993	7
6	Gerardo	Real Madrid	1991–1993	7
6	Martín Criado	Real Madrid	1986–1988	7
6	Sebastián Nadal	Mallorca, Atlético Madrid	1979–1982	7
6	Alberto Rivera	Real Madrid	1995–1996	7

Note: Club(s) represents the permanent clubs during the player's time in the Under-18s.

== See also ==
- Spain national football team
- Spain national under-23 football team
- Spain national under-21 football team
- Spain national under-20 football team
- Spain national under-19 football team
- Spain national under-17 football team
- Spain national under-16 football team
- Spain national under-15 football team
- Spain national youth football team
