= 1959 UEFA European Under-18 Championship =

1959 Европейско първенство по лека атлетика на УЕФА

Tournament details
- Host country: Bulgaria
- Dates: 25 March – 6 April
- Teams: 17

Final positions
- Champions: Bulgaria (1st title)
- Runners-up: Italy
- Third place: Hungary
- Fourth place: East Germany

The UEFA European Under-18 Championship 1959 Final Tournament was held in Bulgaria.

== Teams ==
The following teams entered the tournament:

- Austria
- Bulgaria (host)
- Czechoslovakia
- East Germany
- England
- France
- West Germany
- Greece
- Hungary
- Italy
- Luxembourg
- Netherlands
- Poland
- Romania
- Spain
- Turkey
- Yugoslavia

== Group stage ==
=== Group A ===
Teams	Pld	W	D	L	GF	GA	GD	Pts
East Germany	3	2	0	1	8	3	+5	4
Czechoslovakia	3	1	1	1	2	2	0	3
France	3	1	1	1	5	6	–1	3
Poland	3	0	2	1	5	9	–4	2

29 March	East Germany	3–1	France
	Czechoslovakia	1–1	Poland
31 March	Poland	3–3	France
	Czechoslovakia	1–0	East Germany
2 April	East Germany	5–1	Poland
	France	1–0	Czechoslovakia

=== Group B ===
Teams	Pld	W	D	L	GF	GA	GD	Pts
Italy	4	3	1	0	9	1	+8	7
Romania	4	2	1	1	8	3	+5	5
Greece	4	2	0	2	4	7	–3	4
England	4	1	1	2	6	6	0	3
Turkey	4	0	1	3	3	13	–10	1

25 March	Italy	3–0	England
	Romania	5–0	Turkey
27 March	Italy	4–0	Turkey
	Greece	1–0	Romania
29 March	Turkey	1–1	England
	Italy	1–0	Greece
31 March	Romania	2–1	England
1 April	Greece	3–2	Turkey
2 April	Romania	1–1	Italy
3 April	England	4–0	Greece

=== Group C ===
Teams	Pld	W	D	L	GF	GA	GD	Pts
Bulgaria	3	3	0	0	9	1	+8	6
West Germany	3	2	0	1	2	2	0	4
Netherlands	3	1	0	2	3	5	–2	2
Yugoslavia	3	0	0	3	1	7	–6	0

28 March	Bulgaria	3–1	Netherlands
29 March	West Germany	1–0	Yugoslavia
31 March	Bulgaria	2–0	West Germany
1 April	Netherlands	2–1	Yugoslavia
2 April	Bulgaria	4–0	Yugoslavia
	West Germany	1–0	Netherlands

=== Group D ===
Teams	Pld	W	D	L	GF	GA	GD	Pts
Hungary	3	2	1	0	12	1	+11	5
Spain	3	2	0	1	10	2	+8	4
Austria	3	1	1	1	4	3	+1	3
Luxembourg	3	0	0	3	1	21	–20	0

29 March	Hungary	10–1	Luxembourg
	Spain	3–0	Austria
31 March	Austria	4–0	Luxembourg
1 April	Hungary	2–0	Spain
2 April	Hungary	0–0	Austria
	Spain	7–0	Luxembourg

== Semifinals ==
4 April 1959

Bulgaria	3 – 0	East Germany

Sofia
4 April 1959

Italy	1 – 0	Hungary

Pernik

== Third place match ==
6 April 1959

Hungary	6 – 1	East Germany

Sofia

== Final ==
6 April 1959

Bulgaria	1 – 0	Italy

Sofia

1959 UEFA European Under-18 Championship

Bulgaria
First title
