= Severin Hingsamer =

Austrian footballer

Personal information
- Date of birth: 20 March 2000 (age 26)
- Place of birth: Austria
- Height: 1.84 m (6 ft 0 in)
- Position: Centre back

Team information
- Current team: SV Ried II

Youth career
- 2015–2018: SV Ried

Senior career*
Years	Team	Apps	(Gls)
2017–2019	SV Ried	2	(0)
2019–	SV Ried II	20	(0)

International career
2018	Austria U-18	2	(0)
- * Club domestic league appearances and goals as of 26 October 2020

Severin Hingsamer (born 20 March 2000) is an Austrian footballer who plays for SV Ried II.
