= 1956 UEFA European Under-18 Championship =

Tournament details
- Host country: Hungary
- Dates: 28 March – 2 April
- Teams: 16

Tournament statistics
- Top scorer: (Hungary) László Povázsai (3 goals)

The UEFA European Under-18 Championship 1956 Final Tournament was held in Hungary. During this edition, only group matches were played and no winner was declared. This was done to prevent an excess of competition. Hungary, Italy, Romania and Czechoslovakia were the four group winners.

== Teams ==
The following teams entered the tournament:

- Austria
- Belgium
- Bulgaria
- Czechoslovakia
- East Germany
- England
- France
- West Germany
- Greece
- Hungary (host)
- Italy
- Poland
- Romania
- Saar
- Turkey
- Yugoslavia

== Group A ==
Teams	Pld	W	D	L	GF	GA	GD	Pts
Hungary	3	2	1	0	6	3	+3	5
West Germany	3	1	1	1	2	2	0	3
Bulgaria	3	1	0	2	3	4	–1	2
England	3	1	0	2	5	7	–2	2

28 March	Hungary	0–0	West Germany
	Bulgaria	2–1	England
30 March	West Germany	1–0	Bulgaria
	Hungary	4–2	England
1 April	Hungary	2–1	Bulgaria
	England	2–1	West Germany

== Group B ==
Teams	Pld	W	D	L	GF	GA	GD	Pts
Italy	3	2	0	1	5	2	+3	4
France	3	2	0	1	4	3	+1	4
Saar	3	1	1	1	3	5	–2	3
Belgium	3	0	1	2	5	7	–2	1

28 March	Saar	1–0	France
	Italy	2–1	Belgium
30 March	France	3–2	Belgium
	Italy	3–0	Saar
1 April	Saar	2–2	Belgium
	France	1–0	Italy

== Group C ==
Teams	Pld	W	D	L	GF	GA	GD	Pts
Romania	3	2	1	0	6	2	+4	5
Poland	3	1	1	1	4	4	0	3
Yugoslavia	3	0	2	1	2	3	–1	2
Austria	3	1	0	2	4	7	–3	2

29 March	Romania	1–1	Yugoslavia
	Poland	3–2	Austria
31 March	Austria	1–0	Yugoslavia
	Romania	1–0	Poland
2 April	Romania	4–1	Austria
	Poland	1–1	Yugoslavia

== Group D ==
Teams	Pld	W	D	L	GF	GA	GD	Pts
Czechoslovakia	3	2	1	0	4	1	+3	5
Turkey	3	1	1	1	3	2	+1	3
East Germany	3	0	3	0	3	3	0	3
Greece	3	0	1	2	1	5	–4	1

29 March 1956

Czechoslovakia	2 – 0	Greece
Zikán 22'; Jiří Sůra 72'

Budapest
Attendance: 2,000
Referee: Szilárd Sipos (Hungary)
29 March 1956

East Germany	1 – 1	Turkey
Tschöp 13'	Report	Altan Meral 78'

Városi Stadion, Tatabánya
Attendance: 6,000+
Referee: Andor Bánkuti (Hungary)
31 March 1956

Czechoslovakia	1 – 1	East Germany
Obert 28'		Albrecht Strohmeyer 66'

Kecskemét
Attendance: 7,000
Referee: László Major (Hungary)
31 March 1956

Turkey	2 – 0 Awarded (Note: Greece refused to play against Turkey, so Turkey were awarded a 2–0 walkover victory.)	Greece

2 April 1956

Czechoslovakia	1 – 0	Turkey
Zikán 79'	Report

Dorog Stadion, Dorog
Attendance: 5,000
Referee: Andor Bánkuti (Hungary)
2 April 1956

East Germany	1 – 1	Greece
Albrecht Strohmeyer 45'		Fotinos 80' (pen.)

Városi Stadion, Eger
Attendance: 6,000
Referee: Andor Dorogi (Hungary)
