= Emir Tintiş =

Turkish footballer

Personal information
- Date of birth: 12 January 2004 (age 22)
- Place of birth: Edirne, Turkey
- Height: 1.87 m (6 ft 2 in)
- Position: Left-back

Team information
- Current team: 1461 Trabzon
- Number: 3

Youth career
- 2014–2016: Beşiktaş
- 2016–2017: Edirne DSİspor
- 2017–2022: Galatasaray

Senior career*
Years	Team	Apps	(Gls)
2022–2025	Fatih Karagümrük	17	(0)
2025–	1461 Trabzon	12	(1)

International career^{‡}
2018–2019	Turkey U15	13	(0)
2019–2020	Turkey U16	15	(1)
2021–2022	Turkey U18	15	(0)
2022	Turkey U19	3	(0)
2025	Turkey U20	2	(0)
- * Club domestic league appearances and goals as of 9 November 2025 ‡ National team caps and goals as of 25 March 2025

Emir Tintiş (born 12 January 2004) is a Turkish professional footballer who plays as a left-back for TFF 2. Lig club 1461 Trabzon.

== Professional career ==
Tintiş is a youth product of the academies of Beşiktaş, Edirne DSİspor, and Galatasaray. After a strong season with the development side of Galatasaray, he was not offered a contract and decided to leave the club. On 14 June 2022 he signed a professional contract with Fatih Karagümrük in the Süper Lig.

He made his professional and Süper Lig debut as a starter in a 4–2 loss to Alanyaspor on 7 August 2022.

== International career ==
Tintiş is a youth international for Turkey, having played up to the Turkey U18s where he was the captain.
