= 1960 UEFA European Under-18 Championship =

Tournament details
- Host country: Austria
- Dates: 16–24 April
- Teams: 16

Final positions
- Champions: Hungary (2nd title)
- Runners-up: Romania
- Third place: Portugal
- Fourth place: Austria

The UEFA European Under-18 Championship 1960 Final Tournament was held in Austria.

== Teams ==
The following teams entered the tournament:

- Austria (host)
- Belgium
- Bulgaria
- East Germany
- England
- France
- West Germany
- Greece
- Hungary
- Italy
- Netherlands
- Poland
- Portugal
- Romania
- Spain
- Turkey

== Group stage ==
=== Group A ===
Teams	Pld	W	D	L	GF	GA	GD	Pts
Portugal	3	2	1	0	7	2	+5	5
Netherlands	3	2	0	1	3	2	+1	4
Italy	3	1	1	1	2	1	+1	3
Greece	3	0	0	3	1	8	–7	0

16 April	Netherlands	1–0	Greece
	Portugal	0–0	Italy
18 April	Italy	2–0	Greece
	Portugal	2–1	Netherlands
20 April	Portugal	5–1	Greece
	Netherlands	1–0	Italy

=== Group B ===
Teams	Pld	W	D	L	GF	GA	GD	Pts
Austria	3	2	1	0	5	2	+3	5
Bulgaria	3	1	1	1	3	3	0	3
England	3	1	0	2	4	4	0	2
Poland	3	1	0	2	5	8	–3	2

16 April	Bulgaria	1–0	England
	Austria	3–1	Poland
18 April	England	4–2	Poland
	Austria	1–1	Bulgaria
20 April	Austria	1–0	England
	Poland	2–1	Bulgaria

=== Group C ===
Teams	Pld	W	D	L	GF	GA	GD	Pts
Hungary	3	2	1	0	6	1	+5	5
West Germany	3	1	2	0	3	2	+1	4
Turkey	3	1	0	2	1	4	–3	2
East Germany	3	0	1	2	1	4	–3	1

16 April	Hungary	2–0	East Germany
	West Germany	1–0	Turkey
18 April	Turkey	1–0	East Germany
	West Germany	1–1	Hungary
20 April	Hungary	3–0	Turkey
	West Germany	1–1	East Germany

=== Group D ===
Teams	Pld	W	D	L	GF	GA	GD	Pts
Romania	3	3	0	0	12	2	+10	6
Belgium	3	2	0	1	4	5	–1	4
Spain	3	1	0	2	4	8	–4	2
France	3	0	0	3	3	8	–5	0

16 April	Spain	2–1	France
	Romania	3–0	Belgium
18 April	Belgium	2–1	Spain
	Romania	4–1	France
20 April	Romania	5–1	Spain
	Belgium	2–1	France

== Semifinals ==
22 April 1960

Romania	4 – 1	Austria

Vienna
22 April 1960

Hungary	2 – 1	Portugal

Vienna

== Third place match ==
24 April 1960

Portugal	2 – 1	Austria

Vienna

== Final ==
24 April 1960

Hungary	2 – 1	Romania

Vienna

1960 UEFA European Under-18 Championship

Hungary
Second title
