= Coşkun Taş =

Turkish footballer (1935–2024)

Personal information
- Date of birth: 23 April 1935
- Place of birth: Aydın, Turkey
- Date of death: 11 November 2024 (aged 89)
- Place of death: Cologne, North Rhine-Westphalia, Germany
- Height: 1.73 m (5 ft 8 in)
- Position: Striker

Youth career
- Aydinspor

Senior career*
Years	Team	Apps	(Gls)
1951–1959	Beşiktaş	98	(24)
1959–1961	1. FC Köln	18	(4)
1961–1963	Bonner SC		

International career
1954	Turkey	3	(0)
- * Club domestic league appearances and goals

Coşkun Taş (23 April 1935 – 11 November 2024) was a Turkish international footballer who participated at the 1954 FIFA World Cup. A striker, he played club football in Turkey and Germany for Aydinspor, Beşiktaş, 1. FC Köln and Bonner SC. He won two Turkish league titles with Beşiktaş in 1957 and 1958. He was the first Turkish footballer at 1. FC Köln.

Taş died in Cologne, Germany on 11 November 2024, at the age of 89.
