= Stadio Lungobisenzio =

Coordinates: 43.875727°N 11.109559°E

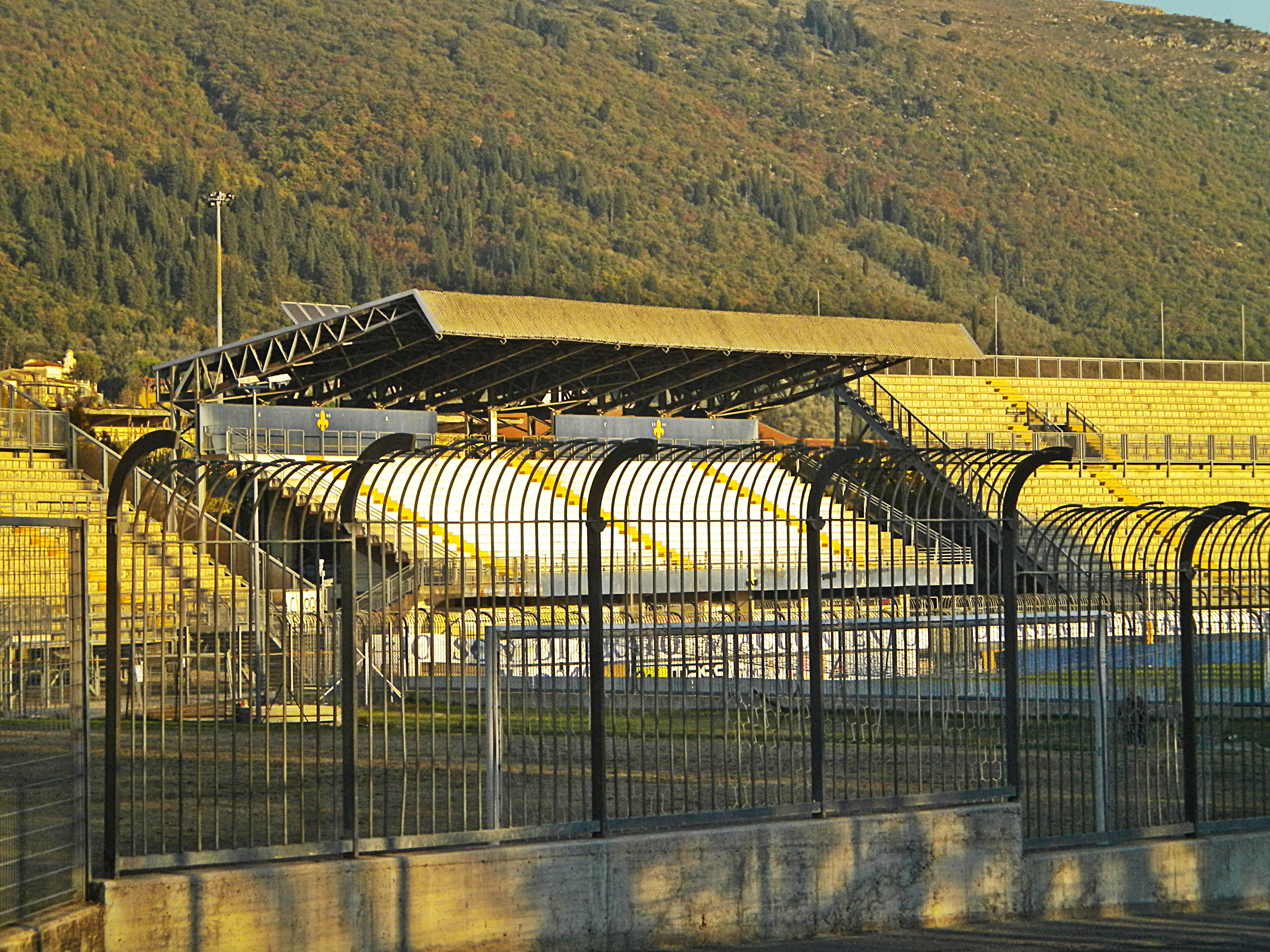
- Interactive map of Stadio Lungobisenzio
- Location: Prato, Italy
- Owner: Municipality of Prato
- Capacity: 6,750
- Surface: Grass

Construction
- Opened: 1941

Tenant
- A.C. Prato

Stadio Lungobisenzio is a municipal stadium in Prato, Italy. It is currently used mostly for football matches and is the home ground of A.C. Prato. The stadium holds 6,800 attendance. It is located in Via Firenze, 5 59100 Prato, along the Bisenzio river. The construction work began in 1939 and was finished in 1941, year of the inauguration.
