= Albert Schaack =

Luxembourgish footballer (1936–2016)

Personal information
- Date of birth: 7 July 1936
- Date of death: 12 September 2016 (aged 80)
- Position: Forward

Senior career*
Years	Team	Apps	(Gls)
- Jeunesse Esch

International career
1954–1959	Luxembourg	21	(4)
- * Club domestic league appearances and goals

Albert Schaack (7 July 1936 – 12 September 2016) was a Luxembourgish footballer who played as a forward for Jeunesse Esch. He made 21 appearances for the Luxembourg national team from 1954 to 1959.
