= Akgün Kaçmaz =

Turkish footballer (1935–2023)

Personal information
- Date of birth: 19 February 1935
- Place of birth: Ankara, Turkey
- Date of death: 12 November 2023 (aged 88)
- Place of death: Fethiye, Turkey
- Height: 1.69 m (5 ft 7 in)
- Position: Defender

Senior career*
Years	Team	Apps	(Gls)
1951–1961	Fenerbahçe	328	(?)
1961–1962	Karagümrükspor		

International career
- Turkey
- * Club domestic league appearances and goals

Akgün Kaçmaz (19 February 1935 – 12 November 2023) was a Turkish football defender who played for Turkey in the 1954 FIFA World Cup. He also played for Fenerbahçe between 1951 and 1961. He died in Fethiye on 12 November 2023, at the age of 88.
