= 1952 FIFA Youth Tournament Under-18 =

Tournament details
- Host country: Spain
- Dates: 13–17 April
- Teams: 6

Final positions
- Champions: Spain (1st title)
- Runners-up: Belgium
- Third place: Austria
- Fourth place: England

Tournament statistics
- Matches played: 7
- Goals scored: 33 (4.71 per match)

The FIFA Youth Tournament Under-18 1952 Final Tournament was held in Spain.

== Teams ==
The following teams entered the tournament:

- Austria
- Belgium
- England
- France
- Spain (host)
- Switzerland

== First round ==
For this round Belgium and Spain received a Bye.

England	4 – 0	Switzerland

Barcelona

Austria	(c) 2 – 2	France

Barcelona

== Semifinals ==
Spain	4 – 1	England

Barcelona

Belgium	(c) 2 – 2	Austria

Barcelona

== Fifth-place match ==
Switzerland	4 – 2	France

Barcelona

== Third place match ==
Austria	(c) 5 – 5	England

Barcelona

== Final ==
Spain	0 – 0 (aet) Spain win based on Goal Average in the semifinal	Belgium

Barcelona

1952 FIFA Youth Tournament Under-18

Spain
First title
