= 1951 FIFA Youth Tournament Under-18 =

Tournament details
- Host country: France
- Dates: 22–26 March
- Teams: 8

Final positions
- Champions: Yugoslavia (1st title)
- Runners-up: Austria
- Third place: Belgium
- Fourth place: Northern Ireland

Tournament statistics
- Matches played: 11
- Goals scored: 36 (3.27 per match)
- Top scorer: (Socialist Federal Republic of Yugoslavia) Miloš Milutinović
- Best player: (Socialist Federal Republic of Yugoslavia) Miloš Milutinović

The FIFA Youth Tournament Under-18 1951 Final Tournament was held in France.

== Teams ==
The following teams entered the tournament:

- Austria
- Belgium
- England
- France (host)
- Netherlands
- Northern Ireland
- Switzerland
- Yugoslavia

== First round ==
22 March 1951

Belgium	(c) 1 – 1	England

Cannes
22 March 1951

Yugoslavia	3 – 0	France

Nice
22 March 1951

Austria	3 – 1	Switzerland

Monaco
22 March 1951

Northern Ireland	2 – 0	Netherlands

Monaco

== Supplementary round ==
In this round the losing teams from the first round participated.

24 March 1951

England	3 – 1	Switzerland

Nice
24 March 1951

Netherlands	4 – 1	France

Cannes

== Semifinals ==
24 March 1951

Yugoslavia	2 – 1	Northern Ireland

Nice
24 March 1951

Austria	3 – 1	Belgium

Monaco

== Fifth-place match ==
26 March 1951

England	2 – 1	Netherlands

Cannes

== Third place match ==
26 March 1951

Belgium	1 – 0	Northern Ireland

Nice

== Final ==
26 March 1951

Yugoslavia	3 – 2	Austria

Cannes

1951 FIFA Youth Tournament Under-18

Yugoslavia
First title
