= 2027 UEFA European Under-19 Championship =

Mistrovství Evropy ve fotbale hráčů do 19 let 2027

Tournament details
- Host country: Czech Republic
- Dates: Summer 2027
- Teams: 8 (from 1 confederation)

The 2027 UEFA European Under-19 Championship will be the 24th edition of the UEFA European Under-19 Championship (74th edition if the Under-18 and Junior era is also included), the annual international youth football championship organised by UEFA for the men's under-19 national teams of Europe. Israel, which were originally selected by UEFA on 26 September 2023, to host the tournament, were replaced by Czech Republic on 4 December 2025 due to security concerns. A total of 8 teams will play in the tournament, with players born on or after 1 January 2008 eligible to participate.

== Venues ==
Vlašim

Prague

Mladá Boleslav

Ústí nad Labem

== Qualification ==
=== Qualified teams ===
The following teams qualified for the final tournament.

Note: All appearance statistics include only U-19 era (since 2002).

Team	Method of qualification	Finals appearance	Last appearance	Previous best performance
Czech Republic	Hosts	8th	2019	Runners-up (2011)
