= 1948 FIFA Youth Tournament Under-18 =

Tournament details
- Host country: England
- Dates: 15–17 April
- Teams: 8

Final positions
- Champions: England (1st title)
- Runners-up: Netherlands
- Third place: Belgium
- Fourth place: Italy

Tournament statistics
- Matches played: 11
- Goals scored: 44 (4 per match)

The 1948 FIFA Youth Tournament, was the first edition of what would later be called the UEFA European Under-19 Championship an annually international men's football tournament organised by FIFA. It was held in England from 15 to 17 April 1948 with five different venues holding the matches. Eight teams competed in a knockout competition with England defeating the Netherlands 3–2 in the final.

== Teams ==
The following teams entered the tournament:

- Austria
- Belgium
- England (host)
- Ireland (FAI)
- Italy
- Netherlands
- Ireland (IFA)
- Wales

== First round ==
15 April 1948

England	4–0	Wales

Loftus Road, London
15 April 1948

Belgium	8–1	Ireland

Selhurst Park, London
15 April 1948

Netherlands	2–0	Republic of Ireland

Vicarage Road, Watford
15 April 1948

Italy	2–0	Austria

Boleyn Ground, London

== Supplementary round ==
In this round the losing teams from the first round participated.

16 April 1948

Republic of Ireland	1–0	Austria

Selhurst Park, London
16 April 1948

Ireland	4–1	Wales

Vicarage Road, Watford

== Semi-finals ==
16 April 1948

England	3–1	Belgium

Boleyn Ground, London
16 April 1948

Netherlands	2–1	Italy

Loftus Road, London

== Fifth-place match ==
17 April 1948

Republic of Ireland	3–2	Ireland

White Hart Lane, London

== Third place match ==
17 April 1948

Belgium	3–1	Italy

White Hart Lane, London

== Final ==
17 April 1948

England	3–2	Netherlands
Darwin; Bannister		Peter Vergauwen; Pete de Jong

White Hart Lane, London

1948 FIFA Youth Tournament Under-18

England
First title
