= 1950 FIFA Youth Tournament Under-18 =

Tournament details
- Host country: Austria
- Dates: 25–28 May
- Teams: 6

Final positions
- Champions: Austria (1st title)
- Runners-up: France
- Third place: Netherlands
- Fourth place: Luxembourg

Tournament statistics
- Matches played: 7
- Goals scored: 32 (4.57 per match)

The FIFA Youth Tournament Under-18 1950 Final Tournament was held in Austria.

== Teams ==
The following teams entered the tournament:

- Austria (host)
- England
- France
- Luxembourg
- Netherlands
- Switzerland

== First round ==
For this round, Austria and France received a Bye.

25 May 1950

Luxembourg	2 – 1	England

Vienna
25 May 1950

Netherlands	3 – 1	Switzerland

Teplice

== Semifinals ==
26 May 1950

Austria	5 – 1	Luxembourg

Vienna
26 May 1950

France	4 – 1	Netherlands

Vienna

== Fifth-place match ==
26 May 1950

England	2 – 1	Switzerland

Stockerau

== Third place match ==
28 May 1950

Netherlands	6 – 0	Luxembourg

Vienna

== Final ==
28 May 1950

Austria	3 – 2	France

Vienna

1950 FIFA Youth Tournament Under-18

Austria
First title
