= Serbia national under-19 football team =

National association football team

Serbia U19
- Nickname: Орлићи / Orlići (The Young Eagles)
- Association: Football Association of Serbia
- Confederation: UEFA (Europe)
- Head coach: Slađan Nikolić
- Captain: Stefan Petrović
- Most caps: Ivan Kurtušić (25)
- Top scorer: Mihajlo Cvetković (13)
- FIFA code: SRB
First colours	Second colours

First international
- (Socialist Federal Republic of Yugoslavia) Yugoslavia 3–0 France (Nice, 22 March 1951)

Biggest win
- (Socialist Federal Republic of Yugoslavia) Yugoslavia 8–0 Luxembourg (Visoko, 26 March 1985)

Biggest defeat
- Bulgaria 4–0 Yugoslavia (Socialist Federal Republic of Yugoslavia) (Sofia, 2 April 1959) (Federal Republic of Yugoslavia) FR Yugoslavia 2–6 Spain (Helsinki, 29 July 2001); Serbia 0–4 Spain (Chiajna, 23 July 2011) Records of biggest win/defeat are for competitive matches only

U-19 European Championship
- Appearances: 30 (first in 1951)
- Best result: Winners 1951, 1979, 2013

The Serbia national under-19 football team (Serbian: Омладинска репрезентација Србије, romanized: Omladinska reprezentacija Srbije) is the national under-19 football team of Serbia and is controlled by the Football Association of Serbia. The team is considered the successor to the Serbia and Montenegro national under-19 football team, which in turn was the successor to the Yugoslavia national under-19 football team.

Serbia won their first U19 title as independent country at the 2013 UEFA European Under-19 Championship, where they beat France in the final 1–0.

== History ==
The Yugoslav U18 team represented the Socialist Federal Republic of Yugoslavia until the country dissolved in 1992.

From 1995, the under-18 team represented the Federal Republic of Yugoslavia. The FR Yugoslavia (and the team) changed its name to Serbia and Montenegro in 2003.

In 2006, Serbia and Montenegro separated and its governing body converted into the Football Association of Serbia.

== Competition history ==
Their first international competition was on the 1951 FIFA Youth Tournament Under-18 where they beat Austria 3–2 in the final.

They also won the 1979 UEFA European Under-18 Championship beating Bulgaria 1–0 in the final.

The biggest success on the intercontinental stage happened on the 1987 FIFA World Youth Championship in Chile, when they became the world youth champions by beating the West Germany 5–4 in the final on a penalty shootout in Santiago. Because of that achievement, that generation was nicknamed Čileanci (The Chileans).

Since the changes in 2001. made by UEFA, when the competition received its current name and level (U19), the Serbian squad has reached the semifinals in 2005, 2009, 2011, and 2014.

In the 2013 UEFA European Under-19 Championship, the Serbian team became the European champion by beating France 1–0 in the final played in Marijampolė.

The semifinal appearance in 2014 qualified them for the 2015 FIFA U-20 World Cup.

== Competitive Record ==
The Serbian Football Association is deemed the direct successor to both SFR Yugoslavia and Serbia and Montenegro by FIFA, and therefore the inheritor to all the records of the defunct nations.

Champions Runners-Up Third Place Fourth Place

=== UEFA European Under-19 Championship ===
UEFA European U-19 Championship Record as follows:

Played as	Year	Result	GP	W	D*	L	GS	GA
(Serbia and Montenegro) SCG	(Norway) 2002	Did not qualify						
(Serbia and Montenegro) SCG	(Liechtenstein) 2003	Did not qualify						
(Serbia and Montenegro) SCG	(Switzerland) 2004	Did not qualify						
(Serbia and Montenegro) SCG	(Northern Ireland) 2005	Semifinals	4	3	0	1	9	5
(Serbia and Montenegro) SCG	(Poland) 2006	Did not qualify						
Serbia	(Austria) 2007	Group stage	3	1	0	2	10	10
Serbia	(Czech Republic) 2008	Did not qualify						
Serbia	(Ukraine) 2009	Semifinals	4	2	1	1	5	5
Serbia	(France) 2010	Did not qualify						
Serbia	(Romania) 2011	Semifinals	4	1	1	2	5	9
Serbia	(Estonia) 2012	Group Stage	3	0	0	3	1	8
Serbia	(Lithuania) 2013	Champions	5	3	2	0	7	4
Serbia	(Hungary) 2014	Semifinals	4	1	3	0	4	3
Serbia	(Greece) 2015	Did not qualify						
Serbia	(Germany) 2016	Did not qualify						
Serbia	(Georgia (country)) 2017	Did not qualify						
Serbia	(Finland) 2018	Did not qualify						
Serbia	(Armenia) 2019	Did not qualify						
Serbia	(Northern Ireland) 2020	Canceled						
Serbia	(Romania) 2021	Canceled						
Serbia	(Slovakia) 2022	Group stage	3	0	1	2	4	9
Serbia	(Malta) 2023	Did not qualify						
Serbia	(Northern Ireland) 2024	Did not qualify						
Serbia	(Romania) 2025	Did not qualify						
Serbia	(Wales) 2026	Group stage	3	0	0	3	1	7
Serbia	(Czech Republic) 2027	To be determined						
Total:9/25		1 Title	32	11	8	13	46	57

* Draws include knockout matches decided by penalty shootout.

== Players ==
=== Current squad ===
The following players were called up for the 2027 UEFA European Under-19 Championship qualification matches against Montenegro, Azerbaijan and Faroe Islands in Pančevo,Serbia.

Caps and goals correct as of 14 November 2026, after the match against Azerbaijan.

No.	Pos.	Player	Date of birth (age)	Caps	Goals	Club
1	GK	Luka Petrić	22 March 2008 (age 18)	6	0	(Portuguese Football Federation) Sporting CP
12	GK	Strahinja Aleksić	9 June 2008 (age 18)	0	0	(Football Association of Serbia) Radnički 1923
2	DF	Ahmed Škrijelj	7 February 2008 (age 18)	1	0	(Football Association of Serbia) Voždovac
3	DF	Stefan Petrović	1 March 2008 (age 18)	12	0	(Football Association of Serbia) Partizan
4	DF	Đorđe Vranić	25 January 2008 (age 18)	5	0	(Football Association of Serbia) Red Star Belgrade
5	DF	Andrej Milanović	20 August 2008 (age 18)	5	0	(Football Association of Serbia) IMT
6	DF	Vukašin Topić	4 February 2008 (age 18)	2	0	(Football Association of Serbia) Vojvodina
14	DF	Nenad Radić	12 September 2008 (age 18)	5	0	(Football Association of Serbia) Mladost Lučani
16	DF	Leon Ivanović	6 January 2008 (age 18)	8	0	(Football Association of Serbia) OFK Beograd
22	DF	Miloš Soprenić	13 May 2008 (age 18)	4	0	(Football Association of Serbia) TSC
7	MF	David Milovanović	15 April 2008 (age 18)	7	4	(Football Association of Serbia) Vojvodina
8	MF	Jovan Ostojić	28 October 2008 (age 18)	7	2	(Football Association of Serbia) Vojvodina
10	MF	Dimitrije Šarić	4 November 2008 (age 18)	8	2	(Football Association of Serbia) Red Star Belgrade
11	MF	Dušan Jovanović	7 February 2008 (age 18)	2	0	(Football Association of Serbia) Teleoptik
17	MF	Luka Jovanović	10 January 2008 (age 18)	2	1	(Football Association of Serbia) Radnik Surdulica
18	MF	Đorđe Radivojević	9 October 2008 (age 18)	2	0	(Football Association of Serbia) IMT
20	MF	Ignjat Miletić	2 January 2008 (age 18)	2	0	(Football Association of Serbia) Red Star Belgrade
21	MF	Uroš Mihailović	7 June 2008 (age 18)	1	0	(Football Association of Serbia) TSC
9	FW	Aleksa Damjanović	4 December 2008 (age 17)	16	3	(German Football Association) Bayer Leverkusen
19	FW	Nikola Paunović	6 November 2008 (age 18)	2	0	(Football Association of Serbia) Jedinstvo Ub

=== Recent call-ups ===
The following players have also been called up to the Serbia under-19 squad within the last twelve months and remain eligible:

Pos.	Player	Date of birth (age)	Caps	Goals	Club	Latest call-up

== Former squads ==
- 2026 UEFA U-19 Football Championship squads – Serbia
- 2022 UEFA U-19 Football Championship squads – Serbia
- 2014 UEFA U-19 Football Championship squads – Serbia
- 2013 UEFA U-19 Football Championship squads – Serbia
- 2012 UEFA U-19 Football Championship squads – Serbia
- 2011 UEFA U-19 Football Championship squads – Serbia
- 2009 UEFA U-19 Football Championship squads – Serbia
- 2007 UEFA U-19 Football Championship squads – Serbia
- 2005 UEFA U-19 Football Championship squads – Serbia and Montenegro

== Management ==
Coaching staff
Position	Name
Head coach	(Serbia) Slađan Nikolić
Assistant coach(es)	(Serbia) Branislav Radulović (Serbia) Aleksandar Jović (Serbia) Branislav Vasiljević
Goalkeeping coach	(Serbia) Viborg Koceić
Analyst	(Serbia) Saša Savić

== Head coaches ==
Years	Name
2026–	(Serbia) Slađan Nikolić
2025–2026	(Serbia) Gordan Petrić
2023–2025	(Serbia) Aleksandar Luković
2023–2024	(Serbia) Radovan Krivokapić
2022	(Serbia) Aleksandar Jović
2021–2022	(Serbia) Dejan Branković
2021	(Serbia) Aleksandar Rogić
2019–2020	(Serbia) Milan Lešnjak
2019	(Serbia) Ivan Jević
2018–2019	(Serbia) Nenad Sakić
2017–2018	(Serbia) Miloš Velebit
2017	(Serbia) Milan Obradović
2016–2017	(Serbia) Milan Kosanović
2015–2016	(Serbia) Branislav Nikolić
2014–2015	(Serbia) Ivan Tomić
2013–2014	(Serbia) Veljko Paunović
2012–2013	(Serbia) Ljubinko Drulović
2011–2012	(Serbia) Zoran Marić
2011	(Serbia) Dejan Govedarica
2010	(Serbia) Tomislav Sivić
2008–2010	(Serbia) Aleksandar Stanojević
2007–2008	(Serbia) Zlatko Krmpotić
2006–2007	(Serbia) Zvonko Živković
2005–2006	(Serbia and Montenegro) Miodrag Radulović
2004–2005	(Serbia and Montenegro) Zvonko Živković
2003–2004	(Serbia and Montenegro) Miodrag Martać
2002–2003	(Federal Republic of Yugoslavia) Slobodan Pavković
2000–2002	(Federal Republic of Yugoslavia) Mile Tomić

== See also ==
- Serbia national football team
- Serbia national under-21 football team
- Serbia national under-20 football team
- Serbia national under-17 football team
- UEFA European Under-19 Championship
