= Turkey national under-18 football team =

National U-18 association football team

Turkey U-18
- Nickname: Genç Milliler
- Association: Turkish Football Federation (TFF)
- Confederation: UEFA (Europe)
- Head coach: Veli Kavlak
- Most caps: Nurettin Koç, Tarkan Alkan, Yetkin Akman (37)
- Top scorer: Oktay Derelioğlu (15)
- FIFA code: TUR
First colours	Second colours

First international
- Netherlands 3–1 Turkey (Saviniemi, Finland; 21 May 1982)

Biggest win
- Turkey 7–0 Gibraltar (Manavgat, Turkey; 24 March 2026)

Biggest defeat
- Romania 6–0 Turkey (Reading, England; 15 May 1983)

The Turkey national under-18 football team is the association football team that represents Turkey at the under-18 level.

== Recent results ==
24 March 2026 UEFA Euro 2027 qualification	Turkey	7–0	Gibraltar	Manavgat, Turkey
16:00	Thierry Darnel Karadeniz 33', 40'; Yusuf Can Karademir 53'; Hasan Ege Akdoğan 55' (pen.), 80'; Tuna Demir 77'; Boran Eligüzel 88'	Report		Stadium: Arslan Zeki Demirci Sports Complex; Attendance: 108; Referee: Matteo Marchetti (Italy)

27 March 2026 UEFA Euro 2027 qualification	Turkey	1–1	Armenia	Manavgat, Turkey
16:00	Yusuf Kahraman 34'	Report	Maykl Asiryan 17'	Stadium: Arslan Zeki Demirci Sports Complex; Attendance: 138; Referee: Matthew MacDermid (Scotland)

30 March 2026 UEFA Euro 2027 qualification	Kosovo	3–1	Turkey	Manavgat, Turkey
15:00	R. Ahmeti 8' (pen.); Mehmeti 20'; Gabrica 89'	Report	Demirbağ 51'	Stadium: Arslan Zeki Demirci Sports Complex; Attendance: 201; Referee: Matteo Marchetti (Italy)

== Current squad ==
- The following players were called up for the Football at the 2022 Mediterranean Games.
- Match dates: 26 June – 5 July 2022
- Caps and goals correct as of: 22 April 2022, after the match against North Macedonia

No.	Pos.	Player	Date of birth (age)	Caps	Goals	Club
	GK	Serhat Öztaşdelen	9 December 2004 (age 21)	0	0	(Turkish Football Federation) Altınordu
	GK	Jankat Yılmaz	16 August 2004 (age 22)	2	0	(Turkish Football Federation) Galatasaray
	DF	Mehmet Enes Gülalan	6 February 2004 (age 22)	0	0	(Turkish Football Federation) Karşıyaka
	DF	Yaşar Kavas	15 January 2004 (age 22)	8	2	(Turkish Football Federation) Konyaspor
	DF	Emir Ortakaya	22 June 2004 (age 22)	5	0	(Turkish Football Federation) Fenerbahçe
	DF	Emir Tintiş	12 January 2004 (age 22)	10	0	(Turkish Football Federation) Galatasaray
	DF	Eren Tunalı	29 April 2004 (age 22)	7	0	(Turkish Football Federation) Bursaspor
	DF	Ali Şahin Yılmaz	1 January 2004 (age 22)	8	1	(Turkish Football Federation) Trabzonspor
	MF	Teoman Gündüz	7 June 2004 (age 22)	0	0	(German Football Association) Hertha BSC
	MF	Mert Kabasakal	2 May 2004 (age 22)	6	0	(Turkish Football Federation) Gençlerbirliği
	MF	Mustafa Pınarcı	1 June 2004 (age 22)	8	2	(Turkish Football Federation) Trabzonspor
	MF	Sami Satılmış	16 June 2004 (age 22)	4	1	(Turkish Football Federation) Altınordu
	MF	Devran Şenyurt	22 August 2004 (age 22)	8	3	(Swiss Football Association) SV Höngg
	FW	Habib Biçer	2 February 2004 (age 22)	9	1	(Turkish Football Federation) Beyoğlu Yeni Çarşı
	FW	Mehmet Ali Büyüksayar	8 May 2004 (age 22)	4	0	(Turkish Football Federation) 1922 Konyaspor
	FW	Ahmet Karademir	2 April 2004 (age 22)	7	0	(Turkish Football Federation) Konyaspor
	FW	Yunus Emre Kefeli	7 May 2004 (age 22)	0	0	(Turkish Football Federation) Modafen
	FW	Ali Kılıç	11 March 2004 (age 22)	7	1	(Turkish Football Federation) Samsunspor
