= Switzerland national under-18 football team =

Switzerland
- Nickname: Schweizer Nati
- Association: Swiss Football Association
- Confederation: UEFA (Europe)
- Head coach: Claude Ryf
- FIFA code: SUI
First colours	Second colours

The Switzerland national under-18 football team is the national under-18 football team of Switzerland and is controlled by Swiss Football Association.

== Players ==
=== Current squad ===
The following players were called up for the friendly matches against Slovakia on 20 and 23 May 2025.

Caps and goals correct as of: 20 May 2025, after the match against Slovakia

No.	Pos.	Player	Date of birth (age)	Caps	Goals	Club
1	GK	Lionel Huwiler	17 February 2007 (age 19)	4	0	(Swiss Football Association) Luzern
12	GK	Bennett Hoch	14 November 2007 (age 18)	5	0	(Swiss Football Association) Basel
21	GK	Jan Uebersax	18 June 2007 (age 19)	4	0	(Swiss Football Association) Young Boys
2	DF	Shiloh Reinhard	3 October 2007 (age 19)	2	0	(Swiss Football Association) Neuchâtel Xamax
3	DF	Lazar Damnjanovic	17 January 2007 (age 19)	9	0	(Swiss Football Association) Young Boys
13	DF	Stevan Raicevic	10 April 2007 (age 19)	10	0	(Swiss Football Association) Young Boys
15	DF	Neil Volken	23 April 2007 (age 19)	11	0	(Swiss Football Association) Zürich
16	DF	Sambou Camara	20 April 2007 (age 19)	5	0	(Swiss Football Association) Winterthur
20	DF	Sirak Bein	7 August 2007 (age 19)	10	0	(French Football Federation) Monaco
5	MF	Gian Stork	12 March 2007 (age 19)	12	0	(Swiss Football Association) Zürich
6	MF	Elio Rufener	12 February 2007 (age 19)	12	1	(Swiss Football Association) Young Boys
7	MF	Aaron Tchamda	7 January 2007 (age 19)	2	1	(Swiss Football Association) Zürich
10	MF	Zidan Tairi	17 April 2007 (age 19)	9	1	(German Football Association) 1899 Hoffenheim
24	MF	Mio Zimmermann	8 August 2007 (age 19)	12	0	(Swiss Football Association) Luzern
26	MF	Max Corbon	13 February 2007 (age 19)	6	1	(French Football Federation) Marseille
9	FW	Dion Cakolli	7 June 2007 (age 19)	9	3	(Italian Football Federation) Atalanta
11	FW	Oscar Renovales	24 October 2007 (age 19)	6	0	(Swiss Football Association) Lausanne-Sport
17	FW	Agon Rexhaj	24 March 2007 (age 19)	4	1	(Swiss Football Association) Basel
18	FW	Ivan Parra	28 July 2007 (age 19)	5	1	(Swiss Football Association) Lausanne-Sport
19	FW	Andrej Vasovic	14 October 2007 (age 19)	12	4	(Swiss Football Association) Luzern
22	FW	Miguel Mardochée	22 May 2007 (age 19)	9	0	(Swiss Football Association) Servette
25	FW	Edin Etoski	2 April 2007 (age 19)	9	0	(Swiss Football Association) Young Boys

=== Recent call-up ===
The following players have also been called up to the squad in the last twelve months and are still eligible for selection.

Pos.	Player	Date of birth (age)	Caps	Goals	Club	Latest call-up

== Swiss national teams ==
- Switzerland national football team
- Switzerland national under-23 football team (also known as Swiss Olympic)
- Switzerland national under-21 football team
- Switzerland national under-20 football team
- Switzerland national under-19 football team
- Switzerland national under-17 football team
- Switzerland national under-16 football team
