= Austria national under-18 football team =

National U-18 association football team

Austria Under-18 or Osterreich U18
- Confederation: UEFA (Europe)
- Head coach: Andreas Heraf (Austria)
- Most caps: Gerald Krajic (25)
- Top scorer: Gerald Krajic (10)
- FIFA code: AUS

FIFA ranking
- Current: 55

The Austria national under-18 football team are a feeder team for the main Austria national football team.

The following players were named in the last squad for the friendly match against Italy U18s on 6 March 2013 & Montenegro U18s on 24 April 2013.

== Players ==
=== Current squad ===
The following players were called up for the friendly tournament matches against Portugal, Finland and Georgia between 24 and 28 March 2023.

Caps and goals correct as of 26 March 2023, after the match against Finland.

No.	Pos.	Player	Date of birth (age)	Caps	Goals	Club
1	GK	Kenan Jusić	10 May 2005 (age 21)	5	0	(Austrian Football Association) Austria Wien
21	GK	Benjamin Göschl	16 November 2005 (age 20)	3	0	(Austrian Football Association) Rapid Wien
23	GK	Valentin Oelz	24 April 2005 (age 21)	2	0	(Austrian Football Association) FC Liefering
2	DF	Luca Pazourek	4 February 2005 (age 21)	6	0	(Austrian Football Association) Austria Wien
3	DF	Jakob Schöller	9 December 2005 (age 20)	2	0	(Austrian Football Association) Admira Wacker Mödling
4	DF	Matteo Schablas	14 March 2005 (age 21)	5	0	(German Football Association) Bayern Munich
5	DF	Dejan Radonjić	25 September 2005 (age 21)	5	0	(Austrian Football Association) Austria Wien
16	DF	Kevin Lebersorger	9 June 2005 (age 21)	6	0	(Austrian Football Association) Red Bull Salzburg
18	DF	Marcel Moswitzer	26 February 2005 (age 21)	5	1	(Austrian Football Association) FC Liefering
20	DF	Mario Pejazić	21 January 2005 (age 21)	2	1	(Austrian Football Association) FC Liefering
22	DF	Filip Milojević	9 February 2005 (age 21)	1	0	(German Football Association) Bayer Leverkusen
6	MF	Alparslan Baran	25 March 2005 (age 21)	8	1	(Austrian Football Association) FC Liefering
7	MF	Florian Micheler	17 May 2005 (age 21)	3	0	(German Football Association) TSG Hoffenheim
8	MF	Benedict Scharner	12 April 2005 (age 21)	5	1	(Austrian Football Association) St. Pölten
10	MF	Emirhan Acar	25 July 2005 (age 21)	3	0	(Italian Football Federation) Torino
13	MF	Dominik Lechner	1 April 2005 (age 21)	4	1	(Austrian Football Association) Red Bull Salzburg
14	MF	Mücahit Ibrahimoglu	9 March 2005 (age 21)	8	0	(Austrian Football Association) Rapid Wien
15	MF	Tim Paumgartner	5 March 2005 (age 21)	5	0	(Austrian Football Association) FC Liefering
17	MF	Zeteny Jano	18 March 2005 (age 21)	5	2	(Austrian Football Association) FC Liefering
9	FW	Furkan Dursun	14 March 2005 (age 21)	8	3	(Austrian Football Association) Rapid Wien
11	FW	Moritz Neumann	25 February 2005 (age 21)	8	0	(Austrian Football Association) Red Bull Salzburg
12	FW	Tim Trummer	10 November 2005 (age 20)	6	0	(Austrian Football Association) Red Bull Salzburg
19	FW	Stefan Kordić	14 February 2005 (age 21)	3	2	(Austrian Football Association) SV Ried

=== Recent call-ups ===
Pos.	Player	Date of birth (age)	Caps	Goals	Club	Latest call-up
