= 1993 FIFA World Youth Championship squads =

FIFA championship roster

Following is a list of the 1993 FIFA World Youth Championship squads. The FIFA U-20 World Cup, until 2005 known as the FIFA World Youth Championship, is the world championship of football for male players under the age of 20 and is organized by Fédération Internationale de Football Association (FIFA). The Championship has been awarded every two years since the first tournament in 1977 held in Tunisia.

== Group A ==
=== Australia ===
Head coach: (Australia) Les Scheinflug

No.	Pos.	Player	Date of birth (age)	Caps	Club
1	GK	Frank Juric	28 October 1973 (aged 19)		(Australia) Melbourne Croatia
2	DF	Craig Moore	12 December 1975 (aged 17)		(Australia) Australian Institute of Sport
3	DF	Aaron Holst	6 March 1974 (aged 18)		(Australia) Marconi Stallions
4	DF	Ante Juric	11 November 1973 (aged 19)		(Australia) Canberra Metros
5	DF	Marc Wingell	3 October 1973 (aged 19)		(Australia) Perth Italia
6	DF	Kevin Muscat	7 August 1973 (aged 19)		(Australia) South Melbourne
7	MF	Sean Cranney	2 October 1973 (aged 19)		(Australia) Brisbane United
8	MF	Anthony Carbone	13 October 1974 (aged 18)		(Australia) Perth Italia
9	FW	Paul Agostino	9 June 1975 (aged 17)		(Switzerland) Young Boys
10	FW	Ante Milicic	4 April 1974 (aged 18)		(Australia) Sydney Croatia
11	MF	Peter Tsekenis	4 August 1973 (aged 19)		(Australia) Sydney Olympic
12	FW	Jimmy Tsekinis	8 May 1975 (aged 17)		(Australia) West Adelaide
13	MF	Ante Morić	19 April 1974 (aged 18)		(Australia) Sydney Croatia
14	FW	Fabio Marcolino	23 August 1974 (aged 18)		(Australia) Marconi Stallions
15	MF	Vasko Trpevski	7 March 1975 (aged 17)		(Australia) Preston Makedonia
16	MF	Darren Iocca	29 August 1974 (aged 18)		(Australia) Marconi Stallions
17	FW	Nicholas Radecki	27 December 1973 (aged 19)		(Australia) Sunshine George Cross
18	GK	Vincent Matassa	21 September 1973 (aged 19)		(Australia) Perth Italia

=== Cameroon ===
Head coach: (Cameroon) Jean Manga-Onguene

No.	Pos.	Player	Date of birth (age)	Caps	Club
1	GK	André-Joël Eboué	25 June 1974 (aged 18)		(Cameroon) Olympic Mvolyé
2	MF	Appolinaire Edjente	31 May 1976 (aged 16)		(Cameroon) MINEDUC Yaoundé
3	DF	Jeffrey Njuakam	17 December 1973 (aged 19)		(Cameroon) Union Douala
4	DF	Jean-Claude Mbvoumin	5 December 1973 (aged 19)		(Cameroon) Canon Yaoundé
5	MF	Bernard Tchoutang	2 September 1976 (aged 16)		(Cameroon) Fovu Baham
6	FW	Pius Ndiefi	5 July 1975 (aged 17)		(France) Lens
7	MF	Bleriot Tobit	27 November 1975 (aged 17)		(Cameroon) Union Douala
8	MF	Serge Mimpo	6 February 1974 (aged 19)		(Cameroon) Canon Yaoundé
9	FW	Patrick Suffo	17 January 1978 (aged 15)		(Cameroon) Tonnerre Yaoundé
10	MF	Cyrille Ndongo	16 February 1974 (aged 19)		(Cameroon) Tonnerre Yaoundé
11	DF	Frédéric Ndiba	4 January 1975 (aged 18)		(Cameroon) Victoria United
12	DF	Simon Moukoko	27 November 1976 (aged 16)		(Cameroon) Léopards Douala
13	FW	David Embé	13 November 1973 (aged 19)		(Cameroon) Racing Bafoussam
14	DF	Rigobert Song	1 July 1976 (aged 16)		(Cameroon) Tonnerre Yaoundé
15	MF	Marc-Vivien Foé	1 May 1975 (aged 17)		(Cameroon) Fogape
16	GK	Patrice Andomo	22 January 1974 (aged 19)		(Cameroon) Colombe Sangmélima
17	DF	Joseph Lewono	1 September 1976 (aged 16)		(Cameroon) Fovu Baham
18	FW	Barnabe Anya	15 August 1976 (aged 16)		(Cameroon) Panthère

=== Colombia ===
Head coach: (Colombia) Reinaldo Rueda

No.	Pos.	Player	Date of birth (age)	Caps	Club
1	GK	Daniel Vélez	8 October 1974 (aged 18)		(Colombia) Envigado
2	DF	Juan Carlos Quintero	20 February 1978 (aged 15)		(Colombia) Atlético Nacional
3	MF	John Tierradentro	15 August 1973 (aged 19)		(Colombia) Boca Juniors
4	MF	James Angulo	20 January 1974 (aged 19)		(Colombia) América de Cali
5	DF	Arley Dinas	16 May 1974 (aged 18)		(Colombia) América de Cali
6	MF	Carlos Montoya	28 October 1973 (aged 19)		(Colombia) América de Cali
7	FW	Henry Zambrano	7 August 1973 (aged 19)		(Colombia) Independiente Medellín
8	MF	Nixon Perea	15 August 1973 (aged 19)		(Colombia) Atlético Nacional
9	MF	Nelson Flórez	1 March 1974 (aged 19)		(Colombia) Independiente Santa Fe
10	FW	Arley Betancourth	4 March 1975 (aged 18)		(Colombia) Deportivo Cali
11	FW	Leonardo Fabio Moreno	2 November 1973 (aged 19)		(Colombia) América de Cali
12	MF	Jersson González	16 February 1975 (aged 18)		(Colombia) Boca Juniors
13	DF	Diego Álvarez	31 October 1974 (aged 18)		(Colombia) América de Cali
14	FW	Víctor Hugo Mafla	7 January 1974 (aged 19)		(Colombia) América de Cali
15	DF	Wilmer Ortegón	2 March 1974 (aged 19)		(Colombia) América de Cali
16	MF	Óscar Restrepo	2 January 1974 (aged 19)		(Colombia) Arcos Zaragoza
17	MF	Edinson Chávez	4 February 1974 (aged 19)		(Colombia) Deportivo Cali
18	GK	Calixto Chiquillo	23 November 1973 (aged 19)		(Colombia) Atlético Junior

=== Russia ===
Head coach: (Russia) Aleksandr Piskaryov

No.	Pos.	Player	Date of birth (age)	Caps	Club
1	GK	Sergei Aleksandrov	7 December 1973 (aged 19)		(Ukraine) Nyva Ternopil
2	DF	Dmitri Ananko	29 September 1973 (aged 19)		(Russia) Spartak Moscow
3	DF	Murad Magomedov	21 September 1973 (aged 19)		(Russia) Zhemchuzhnia Sochi
4	DF	Maksim Bokov	29 August 1973 (aged 19)		(Russia) Zenit St Petersburg
5	DF	Albert Oskolkov	9 August 1973 (aged 19)		(Russia) Lokomotiv Nizhny Novgorod
6	MF	Aleksandr Karatayev	22 November 1973 (aged 19)		(Russia) Lokomotiv Moscow
7	FW	Aleksei Savchenko	14 May 1975 (aged 17)		(Russia) Dynamo Moscow
8	MF	Igor Zazulin	13 April 1974 (aged 18)		(Russia) Zenit St Petersburg
9	MF	Denis Klyuyev	7 September 1973 (aged 19)		(Russia) Asmaral Moscow
10	FW	Vladimir Beschastnykh	1 April 1974 (aged 18)		(Russia) Spartak Moscow
11	FW	Yuri Petrov	18 July 1974 (aged 18)		(Russia) Lokomotiv Moscow
12	GK	Aleksandr Filimonov	15 October 1973 (aged 19)		(Russia) Fakel Voronezh
13	DF	Mikhail Murashov	27 October 1973 (aged 19)		(Russia) Torpedo Moscow
14	MF	Nikolai Golubkin	6 September 1974 (aged 18)		(Russia) Rostselmash Rostov
15	MF	Yevgeni Kharlachyov	20 January 1974 (aged 19)		(Russia) Krylia Sovetov
16	MF	Aleksandr Zernov	21 July 1974 (aged 18)		(Russia) Tekstilshchik Ivanovo
17	DF	Vasili Potekhin	17 September 1974 (aged 18)		(Russia) Shinnik Yaroslavl
18	FW	Sergei Chudin	24 November 1973 (aged 19)		(Russia) Spartak Moscow

- Beschastnykh was selected but Spartak Moscow did not release him.

== Group B ==
=== Germany ===
Head coach: (Germany) Rainer Bonhof

No.	Pos.	Player	Date of birth (age)	Caps	Club
1	GK	Dimo Wache	1 November 1973 (aged 19)		(Germany) Borussia Mönchengladbach
2	DF	Werner Protzel	5 October 1973 (aged 19)		(Germany) Bayern Munich
3	DF	Frank Meissner	14 September 1973 (aged 19)		(Germany) Werder Bremen
4	DF	Mirko Stark	28 September 1973 (aged 19)		(Germany) 1. FC Köln
5	DF	Markus Schwiderowski	12 December 1973 (aged 19)		(Germany) Schalke 04
6	DF	Max Eberl	21 September 1973 (aged 19)		(Germany) Bayern Munich
7	MF	Carsten Ramelow	20 March 1974 (aged 18)		(Germany) Hertha BSC
8	MF	Guido Jörres	7 March 1974 (aged 18)		(Germany) 1. FC Köln
9	FW	Carsten Jancker	28 August 1974 (aged 18)		(Germany) 1. FC Köln
10	MF	Dietmar Hamann	27 August 1973 (aged 19)		(Germany) Bayern Munich
11	FW	André Breitenreiter	2 October 1973 (aged 19)		(Germany) Hannover 96
12	GK	Dietmar Hummel	20 October 1973 (aged 19)		(Germany) SC Freiburg
13	DF	Torsten Lieberknecht	1 August 1973 (aged 19)		(Germany) 1. FC Kaiserslautern
14	FW	Thomas Reis	4 October 1973 (aged 19)		(Germany) Eintracht Frankfurt
15	MF	Manfred Burghartswieser	23 August 1973 (aged 19)		(Germany) Bayern Munich
16	MF	Sascha Lenhart	16 December 1973 (aged 19)		(Germany) 1. FC Köln
17	FW	Frank Schmidt	3 January 1974 (aged 19)		(Germany) 1. FC Nürnberg
18	MF	Andreas Bluhm	21 December 1973 (aged 19)		(Germany) Borussia Mönchengladbach

=== Ghana ===
Head coach: (Ghana) Fred Osam

No.	Pos.	Player	Date of birth (age)	Caps	Club
1	GK	Ben Owu	14 October 1974 (aged 18)		(Ghana) Great Olympics
2	DF	Emmanuel Asare	31 December 1972 (aged 20)		(Ghana) Okwawu United
3	DF	Kofi Nimo	1 October 1974 (aged 18)		(Ghana) Hearts of Oak
4	DF	Stephen Baidoo	25 September 1976 (aged 16)		(Ghana) Real Tamale United
5	DF	Isaac Asare	1 September 1974 (aged 18)		(Belgium) Anderlecht
6	MF	Mohammed Gargo	19 June 1975 (aged 17)		(Italy) Torino
7	MF	Kwabena Boateng	10 October 1974 (aged 18)		(Ghana) Neoplan Stars
8	MF	Nii Lamptey	10 December 1974 (aged 18)		(Belgium) Anderlecht
9	FW	Augustine Ahinful	30 November 1974 (aged 18)		(Ghana) Goldfields
10	FW	Nelson Mensah	7 December 1973 (aged 19)		(Romania) Dinamo București
11	FW	Emmanuel Duah	14 November 1976 (aged 16)		(Italy) Torino
12	GK	Frederick Ollenu	28 November 1975 (aged 17)		(Ghana) Dawu Youngsters
13	MF	Charles Akonnor	12 March 1974 (aged 18)		(Germany) Fortuna Köln
14	DF	Samuel Kuffour	3 September 1976 (aged 16)		(Italy) Torino
15	DF	Ransford Banini	15 October 1973 (aged 19)		(Ghana) Goldfields
16	GK	Jaraa Ali	4 October 1976 (aged 16)		(Ghana) Hearts of Oak
17	MF	Adjetey Adjei	31 December 1973 (aged 19)		(Ghana) Goldfields
18	MF	Daniel Addo	6 November 1976 (aged 16)		(Germany) Bayer Leverkusen

=== Portugal ===
Head coach: (Portugal) Agostinho Oliveira

No.	Pos.	Player	Date of birth (age)	Caps	Goals	Club
1	GK	Paulo Costinha	22 September 1973 (aged 19)	2	0	(Portuguese Football Federation) Boavista
2	MF	Zeca	7 February 1975 (aged 18)	1	0	(Portuguese Football Federation) Marítimo
3	DF	Pedro Henriques	16 October 1974 (aged 18)	2	0	(Portuguese Football Federation) Benfica
4	DF	Hugo Costa	4 November 1973 (aged 19)	0	0	(Portuguese Football Federation) Gil Vicente
5	DF	Litos	25 February 1974 (aged 19)	2	0	(Portuguese Football Federation) Campomaiorense
6	DF	Vítor Cardoso	1 December 1973 (aged 19)	2	0	(Portuguese Football Federation) Espinho
7	DF	Nélson Morais	24 March 1974 (aged 18)	2	0	(Portuguese Football Federation) Gil Vicente
8	DF	Nuno Afonso	6 October 1974 (aged 18)	2	0	(Portuguese Football Federation) Benfica
9	FW	Sérgio Ribeiro	11 January 1974 (aged 19)	2	0	(Portuguese Football Federation) Boavista
10	MF	Ricardo Nascimento	18 April 1974 (aged 18)	0	0	(Portuguese Football Federation) Leixões
11	FW	Tonanha	3 February 1974 (aged 19)	2	0	(Portuguese Football Federation) Freamunde
12	GK	Paulo Morais	10 August 1974 (aged 18)	1	0	(Portuguese Football Federation) Sporting CP
13	FW	Bambo	22 October 1974 (aged 18)	2	1	(Portuguese Football Federation) Boavista
14	MF	Poejo	14 September 1973 (aged 19)	2	0	(Portuguese Football Federation) Sporting CP
15	MF	Paulo Ferreira	14 September 1973 (aged 19)	1	0	(Portuguese Football Federation) Estrela da Amadora
16	MF	Costa	18 November 1973 (aged 19)	1	0	(Portuguese Football Federation) Nacional
17	FW	Hugo Porfírio	28 September 1973 (aged 19)	2	0	(Portuguese Football Federation) Sporting CP
18	MF	Luís Andrade	30 September 1973 (aged 19)	1	1	(Portuguese Football Federation) Estoril

=== Uruguay ===
Head coach: (Uruguay) Angel Castelnoble

No.	Pos.	Player	Date of birth (age)	Caps	Club
1	GK	Sergio Martínez	13 October 1974 (aged 18)		(Uruguay) Sud América
2	DF	Marcos Madruga	23 August 1974 (aged 18)		(Uruguay) Danubio
3	DF	Nelson Olivera	19 June 1974 (aged 18)		(Uruguay) Fénix
4	DF	Diego López	22 August 1974 (aged 18)		(Uruguay) River Plate
5	DF	Tabaré Silva	30 August 1974 (aged 18)		(Uruguay) Defensor Sporting
6	DF	Edgardo Adinolfi	27 March 1974 (aged 18)		(Uruguay) River Plate
7	MF	Sergio Sena Lamela	15 August 1973 (aged 19)		(Uruguay) Nacional
8	FW	Fabián O'Neill	14 October 1973 (aged 19)		(Uruguay) Nacional
9	MF	Rodrigo Lemos	3 October 1973 (aged 19)		(Uruguay) Nacional
10	MF	Alejandro Márquez	2 January 1974 (aged 19)		(Uruguay) River Plate
11	FW	Fernando Correa	6 January 1974 (aged 19)		(Uruguay) River Plate
12	GK	Javier Menéndez	21 July 1974 (aged 18)		(Uruguay) Wanderers
13	FW	Nestor Correa	23 August 1974 (aged 18)		(Uruguay) Liverpool
14	DF	Alejandro Traversa	8 September 1974 (aged 18)		(Uruguay) Defensor Sporting
15	FW	Gabriel Álvez	26 December 1974 (aged 18)		(Uruguay) Defensor Sporting
16	MF	Javier Delgado	8 July 1975 (aged 17)		(Uruguay) Danubio
17	DF	Marcelo Dapueto	29 July 1974 (aged 18)		(Uruguay) Racing Club
18	DF	Fernando Rodríguez	20 March 1974 (aged 18)		(Uruguay) Nacional

== Group C ==
=== England ===
Head coach: (England) David Burnside

No.	Pos.	Player	Date of birth (age)	Caps	Club
1	GK	Simon Sheppard	7 August 1973 (aged 19)		(England) Watford
2	DF	Steve Watson	1 April 1974 (aged 18)		(England) Newcastle United
3	DF	David Unsworth	16 October 1973 (aged 19)		(England) Everton
4	DF	Marvin Harriott	20 April 1974 (aged 18)		(England) Luton Town
5	DF	Ian Pearce	7 May 1974 (aged 18)		(England) Chelsea
6	DF	Andy Myers	3 November 1973 (aged 19)		(England) Chelsea
7	FW	Chris Bart-Williams	16 June 1974 (aged 18)		(England) Sheffield Wednesday
8	MF	Darren Caskey	21 August 1974 (aged 18)		(England) Tottenham Hotspur
9	FW	Nick Barmby	11 February 1974 (aged 19)		(England) Tottenham Hotspur
10	MF	Jamie Pollock	16 February 1974 (aged 19)		(England) Middlesbrough
11	FW	Alan Thompson	22 December 1973 (aged 19)		(England) Newcastle United
12	MF	Andy Johnson	2 May 1974 (aged 18)		(England) Norwich City
13	GK	David Watson	10 November 1973 (aged 19)		(England) Barnsley
14	MF	Nicky Butt	21 January 1975 (aged 18)		(England) Manchester United
15	FW	Julian Joachim	20 September 1974 (aged 18)		(England) Leicester City
16	FW	Adrian Mike	16 November 1973 (aged 19)		(England) Manchester City
17	MF	Ian Selley	14 June 1974 (aged 18)		(England) Arsenal
18	DF	Anthony Hughes	3 October 1973 (aged 19)		(England) Crewe Alexandra

=== South Korea ===
Head coach: (South Korea) Park Sang-in

No.	Pos.	Player	Date of birth (age)	Caps	Club
1	GK	Kim Hae-woon	25 December 1973 (aged 19)		(South Korea) Daegu University
2	DF	Yoo Sang-soo	28 August 1973 (aged 19)		(South Korea) Korea University
3	DF	Kim Jin-woo	9 October 1975 (aged 17)		(South Korea) Daegu University
4	DF	Lee Ki-hyung	28 September 1974 (aged 18)		(South Korea) Korea University
5	DF	Kim Jae-shin	30 August 1973 (aged 19)		(South Korea) Konkuk University
6	DF	Park Chul	20 August 1973 (aged 19)		(South Korea) Daegu University
7	FW	Kim Dae-eui	30 May 1974 (aged 18)		(South Korea) Korea University
8	MF	Hwang Jae-pil	9 September 1973 (aged 19)		(South Korea) Yonsei University
9	MF	Lee Ho-sung	12 September 1974 (aged 18)		(South Korea) Chung-Ang University
10	FW	Choi Yong-soo	10 September 1973 (aged 19)		(South Korea) Yonsei University
11	FW	Cho Hyun-doo	23 November 1973 (aged 19)		(South Korea) Hanyang University
12	DF	Choi Sung-yong	25 December 1975 (aged 17)		(South Korea) Korea University
13	MF	Cho Hyun	24 February 1974 (aged 19)		(South Korea) Dongguk University
14	MF	Cho Jin-ho	2 August 1973 (aged 19)		(South Korea) Kyung Hee University
15	MF	Lee Kyung-soo	28 October 1973 (aged 19)		(South Korea) Soongsil University
16	FW	Seo Dong-won	12 December 1973 (aged 19)		(South Korea) Korea University
17	FW	Jeon Kyung-joon	10 September 1973 (aged 19)		(South Korea) POSCO Atoms
18	GK	Choi Ik-hyung	5 August 1973 (aged 19)		(South Korea) Korea University

=== Turkey ===
Head coach: (Turkey) Serpil Hamdi Tüzün

No.	Pos.	Player	Date of birth (age)	Caps	Club
1	GK	Yetkin Akman	2 March 1974 (aged 19)		(Turkey) Trabzonspor
2	DF	Bülent Kapıcı	29 August 1973 (aged 19)		(Turkey) Marmaris Belediyespor
3	DF	Hakan Şenol Ensari	17 February 1974 (aged 19)		(Netherlands) Ajax
4	DF	Emre Aşık	13 December 1973 (aged 19)		(Turkey) Balıkesirspor
5	DF	Sinan Demircioğlu	23 April 1975 (aged 17)		(Turkey) Beşiktaş
6	DF	Seyfettin Kurtulmuş	19 August 1975 (aged 17)		(Turkey) Galatasaray
7	MF	Hayati Köse	1 October 1973 (aged 19)		(Turkey) Boluspor
8	MF	Yusuf Tokaç	2 December 1973 (aged 19)		(Turkey) Beşiktaş
9	FW	Oktay Derelioğlu	17 December 1975 (aged 17)		(Turkey) Trabzonspor
10	FW	Mustafa Kocabey	6 October 1974 (aged 18)		(Turkey) Galatasaray
11	MF	Turan Ilçıktay	19 March 1975 (aged 17)		(Turkey) Beşiktaş
12	GK	Murat Türksoy	1 December 1974 (aged 18)		(Turkey) Ankaragücü
13	MF	Dursun Karaman	8 May 1975 (aged 17)		(Turkey) Fenerbahçe
14	DF	Hasan Özer	1 October 1974 (aged 18)		(Turkey) Gaziantepspor
15	MF	Serkan Reçber	18 October 1975 (aged 17)		(Turkey) Zeytinburnuspor
16	DF	Tarkan Alkan	1 August 1974 (aged 18)		(Turkey) Fatih Karagümrük
17	FW	Tekin Sazlog	21 March 1976 (aged 16)		(Germany) Hertha Zehlendorf
18	MF	Bülent Yılmaz	29 November 1973 (aged 19)		(Turkey) Bakırköyspor

=== United States ===
Head coach: (England) Bobby Howe

No.	Pos.	Player	Date of birth (age)	Caps	Club
1	GK	Richard Koczak	31 August 1973 (aged 19)		(United States) Oakwood
2	DF	Matt McKeon	24 September 1974 (aged 18)		(United States) Scott Gallagher SC
3	DF	Gregg Berhalter	1 August 1973 (aged 19)		(United States) University of North Carolina
4	FW	Chris Faklaris	30 October 1973 (aged 19)		(United States) University of South Carolina
5	DF	Brian Johnson	7 March 1974 (aged 18)		(United States) Fresno State
6	MF	Kerry Zavagnin	2 July 1974 (aged 18)		(United States) Metro Magic
7	DF	Mike Gentile	24 May 1974 (aged 18)		(United States) University of Wisconsin–Madison
8	MF	Rob Smith	20 August 1973 (aged 19)		(United States) University of South Carolina
9	MF	Brian Kelly	6 October 1974 (aged 18)		(United States) FC Delco
10	FW	Nelson Vargas	6 August 1974 (aged 18)		(United States) Inter Juventus
11	MF	Miles Joseph	2 May 1974 (aged 18)		(United States) Clemson University
12	DF	Brandon Pollard	9 October 1973 (aged 19)		(United States) University of Virginia
13	MF	Matt Beavers	8 August 1973 (aged 19)		(United States) University of San Francisco
14	DF	Dana Quick	6 December 1974 (aged 18)		(United States) Rochester Mavericks
15	MF	Robert Labelle	16 August 1973 (aged 19)		(United States) UCLA
16	MF	William Lanza	18 July 1974 (aged 18)		(United States) Notre Dame
17	MF	Imad Baba	15 March 1974 (aged 18)		(United States) Clemson University
18	GK	Jeff Cassar	2 February 1974 (aged 19)		(United States) Florida International University

== Group D ==
=== Brazil ===
Head coach: (Brazil) Júlio César Leal

No.	Pos.	Player	Date of birth (age)	Caps	Club
1	GK	Dida	7 October 1973 (aged 19)		(Brazil) Vitória
2	DF	Bruno Carvalho	26 March 1974 (aged 18)		(Brazil) Vasco da Gama
3	DF	Gélson Baresi	11 May 1974 (aged 18)		(Brazil) Flamengo
4	DF	Juárez	25 September 1973 (aged 19)		(Brazil) Portuguesa
5	MF	Marcelinho Paulista	13 September 1973 (aged 19)		(Brazil) Corinthians
6	DF	Wagner	28 December 1973 (aged 19)		(Brazil) Vitória
7	FW	Catê	7 November 1973 (aged 19)		(Brazil) São Paulo
8	MF	Emerson Pereira	21 August 1973 (aged 19)		(Brazil) São Paulo
9	FW	Gian	25 August 1974 (aged 18)		(Brazil) Vasco da Gama
10	FW	Adriano	20 September 1974 (aged 18)		(Switzerland) Neuchâtel Xamax
11	MF	Yan	1 May 1975 (aged 17)		(Brazil) Vasco da Gama
12	GK	Fábio Noronha	12 October 1975 (aged 17)		(Brazil) Flamengo
13	DF	André Luís	15 February 1974 (aged 19)		(Brazil) Guarani
14	DF	Argel Fuchs	4 September 1974 (aged 18)		(Brazil) Internacional
15	MF	Hermes	19 September 1974 (aged 18)		(Brazil) Corinthians
16	MF	Caíco	15 August 1975 (aged 17)		(Brazil) Internacional
17	FW	Roberto	29 March 1974 (aged 18)		(Brazil) Corinthians
18	FW	Mário Jardel	18 September 1973 (aged 19)		(Brazil) Vasco da Gama

=== Mexico ===
Head coach: (Mexico) Juan de Dios Castillo

No.	Pos.	Player	Date of birth (age)	Caps	Club
1	GK	Oswaldo Sánchez	21 September 1973 (aged 19)		(Mexico) Atlas
2	DF	Francisco Amante	3 June 1974 (aged 18)		(Mexico) Atlas
3	DF	Juan Solis	19 July 1974 (aged 18)		(Mexico) Tigres UANL
4	DF	Duilio Davino	21 March 1976 (aged 16)		(Mexico) San Sebastián de León
5	DF	Carlos González	5 November 1973 (aged 19)		(Mexico) Tampico
6	MF	Rubén González	5 November 1973 (aged 19)		(Mexico) Toluca
7	MF	Joel Sánchez	17 August 1974 (aged 18)		(Mexico) Tecos UAG
8	FW	Gabriel García	16 February 1974 (aged 19)		(Mexico) Tecos UAG
9	FW	Jesús Olalde	5 May 1974 (aged 18)		(Mexico) UNAM
10	MF	José García	14 August 1974 (aged 18)		(Mexico) UNAM
11	FW	Alan Guadarrama	22 September 1974 (aged 18)		(Mexico) Cruz Azul
12	GK	Ángel Maldonado	8 September 1973 (aged 19)		(Mexico) América
13	DF	Ricardo Munguía	5 June 1975 (aged 17)		(Mexico) Veracruz
14	MF	Jorge Cruz	14 January 1974 (aged 19)		(Mexico) Tampico
15	DF	Rafael Astivia	9 April 1974 (aged 18)		(Mexico) América
16	MF	Manuel Sol	31 August 1973 (aged 19)		(Mexico) UNAM
17	MF	Vicente Nieto	6 January 1974 (aged 19)		(Mexico) UNAM
18	FW	Luis Salazar	28 November 1973 (aged 19)		(Mexico) Coras de Tepic

=== Norway ===
Head coach: (Norway) Bjørn Hansen

No.	Pos.	Player	Date of birth (age)	Caps	Club
1	GK	Thomas Myhre	16 October 1973 (aged 19)		(Norway) Viking
2	DF	Stian Tobiassen	31 December 1974 (aged 18)		(Norway) Moss
3	DF	Odd Arild Skonhoft	26 September 1973 (aged 19)		(Norway) Start
4	MF	Thomas Østvold	18 October 1973 (aged 19)		(Norway) Lyn Oslo
5	DF	Hai Ngoc Tran	10 January 1975 (aged 18)		(Norway) Kongsvinger
6	DF	Torjus Hansén	29 October 1973 (aged 19)		(Norway) Odd Grenland
7	DF	Tarje Nordstrand Jacobsen	5 May 1974 (aged 18)		(Norway) Molde
8	MF	Tommy Svindal Larsen	11 August 1973 (aged 19)		(Norway) Start
9	MF	Lars Vestrum Olsson	8 September 1973 (aged 19)		(Norway) Strømsgodset
10	MF	Thomas Hafstad	13 March 1974 (aged 18)		(Norway) Mjølner
11	MF	Harald Lødemel	1 December 1974 (aged 18)		(Norway) Sogndal
12	GK	Lars Engebråten	6 February 1974 (aged 19)		(Norway) Mercantile
13	FW	Børge Rannestad	16 August 1973 (aged 19)		(Norway) Viking
14	DF	Brede Skorve	14 November 1973 (aged 19)		(Norway) Sogndal
15	FW	Rune Nordengen	12 May 1974 (aged 18)		(Norway) Lillestrøm
16	FW	Espen Daland	14 May 1974 (aged 18)		(Norway) Start
17	MF	Petter Rudi	17 September 1973 (aged 19)		(Norway) Molde
18	GK	Jon Knudsen	20 November 1974 (aged 18)		(Norway) Lillestrøm

=== Saudi Arabia ===
Head coach: (Brazil) Carlos Roberto Cabral

No.	Pos.	Player	Date of birth (age)	Caps	Club
1	GK	Hussein Al-Sadiq	15 October 1973 (aged 19)		(Saudi Arabia) Al-Qadisiya
2	DF	Mohammed Sheliah	28 September 1974 (aged 18)		(Saudi Arabia) Al-Ahli
3	MF	Khalid Al-Rashaid	3 August 1974 (aged 18)		(Saudi Arabia) Al-Hilal
4	DF	Kamal Hawsawi	21 September 1974 (aged 18)		(Saudi Arabia) Al-Ittihad
5	DF	Abdullah Al-Takrouni	15 November 1973 (aged 19)		(Saudi Arabia) Al-Ahli
6	MF	Ahmed Al-Maghrabi	20 September 1975 (aged 17)		(Saudi Arabia) Al-Ahli
7	FW	Fahad Al-Ghesheyan	1 August 1973 (aged 19)		(Saudi Arabia) Al-Hilal
8	DF	Jarei Al-Garni	17 October 1974 (aged 18)		(Saudi Arabia) Al-Ittihad
9	FW	Abdulaziz Al-Dosari	17 November 1973 (aged 19)		(Saudi Arabia) Al-Ahli
10	MF	Mohamed Al-Orami	27 November 1974 (aged 18)		(Saudi Arabia) Al-Hilal
11	FW	Obeid Al-Dosari	2 October 1975 (aged 17)		(Saudi Arabia) Al-Wahda
12	DF	Waleed Al-Gamdi	1 September 1973 (aged 19)		(Saudi Arabia) Al-Nasr
13	MF	Abdul Sabyani	3 September 1973 (aged 19)		(Saudi Arabia) Al-Hilal
14	MF	Ahmed Saeedan	10 December 1975 (aged 17)		(Saudi Arabia) Al Ahli
15	FW	Nasser Al-Ghatani	5 December 1973 (aged 19)		(Saudi Arabia) Rowadah
16	MF	Khamis Al-Owairan	8 September 1973 (aged 19)		(Saudi Arabia) Al-Hilal
17	DF	Mesfer Al-Shamrany	21 July 1974 (aged 18)		(Saudi Arabia) Al Ahli
18	GK	Mansour Al-Halwah	29 July 1974 (aged 18)		(Saudi Arabia) Al-Hilal
