= 1992–93 in Australian soccer =

Soccer in Australia
- Season: 1992–93

Men's soccer
- NSL Premiership: South Melbourne
- NSL Championship: Marconi Fairfield
- NSL Cup: Heidelberg United

The 1992–93 season was the 24th season of national competitive soccer in Australia and 110th overall.

== National teams ==
=== Men's senior ===
==== Results and fixtures ====
===== Friendlies =====
5 July 1992	Australia	1–0	Croatia	Melbourne, Australia
	Marth 62'	Report		Stadium: Olympic Park; Attendance: 11,000; Referee: John Fraser (Australia)

8 July 1992	Australia	3–1	Croatia	Adelaide, Australia
	Tapai 10'; Spink 14'; van Blerk 80'	Report	Weber 31'	Stadium: Hindmarsh Stadium; Attendance: 2,500; Referee: Tom McRoe (Australia)

12 July 1992	Australia	0–0	Croatia	Sydney, Australia
		Report		Stadium: Sydney Football Stadium; Attendance: 12,735; Referee: Gary Power (Australia)

15 April 1993	Kuwait	0–1	Australia	Woodlands, Singapore
		Report	Trimboli 10'	Stadium: Woodlands Stadium

15 April 1993	Kuwait	3–1	Australia	Woodlands, Singapore
	Ashour 57'; Habashi 60', 79'	Report	Wade 16' (pen.)	Stadium: Woodlands Stadium

===== 1994 FIFA World Cup qualification =====
====== First round ======
Pos	Team	Pld	W	D	L	GF	GA	GD	Pts	Qualification	Australia	French Polynesia	Solomon Islands
1	Australia	4	4	0	0	13	2	+11	8	Advance to Second round	—	2–0	6–1
2	Tahiti	4	1	1	2	5	8	−3	3		0–3	—	4–2
3	Solomon Islands	4	0	1	3	5	13	−8	1		1–2	1–1	—

Source: RSSSF

4 September 1992	Solomon Islands	1–2	Australia	Honiara, Solomon Islands
	Vato 83'	Report	Veart 8'; McCulloch 86'	Stadium: Lawson Tama Stadium; Attendance: 8,000; Referee: Gary Fleet (New Zealand)

11 September 1992	Tahiti	0–3	Australia	Papeete, French Polynesia
		Report	Mori 2'; Veart 44'; Wade 59'	Stadium: Stade Olympique Territorial; Attendance: 3,185; Referee: Lennox Sharp (New Zealand)

20 September 1992	Australia	2–0	Tahiti	Brisbane, Australia
	Veart 11'; Duraković 75'	Report		Stadium: Perry Park; Referee: Kaltatak Kalokis (Vanuatu)

26 September 1992	Australia	6–1	Solomon Islands	Newcastle, Australia
	Tobin 5'; Gray 55'; Wade 60'; Veart 83'; Brown 84'; Duraković 87'	Report		Stadium: Austral Park; Referee: Kaltatak Kalokis (Vanuatu)

====== Second round ======
30 May 1993	New Zealand	0–1	Australia	Auckland, New Zealand
		Report	Arnold 55'	Attendance: 10,952; Referee: Bo Karlsson (Sweden)

6 June 1993	Australia	3–0 (4–0 agg.)	New Zealand	Melbourne, Australia
	Veart 1'; Vidmar 3'; Zelic 49'	Report		Stadium: Olympic Park; Referee: Jacobs Ullenberg (Sweden)

===== 1992 Indonesia Independence Cup =====
Pos	Team	Pld	W	D	L	GF	GA	GD	Pts	Qualification
1	South Korea U-19	4	4	0	0	5	1	+4	8	Advance to Final
2	Malaysia	4	2	1	1	4	2	+2	5	Advance to Final
3	Australia	4	2	0	2	4	2	+2	4	
4	Indonesia	4	1	1	2	5	6	−1	3	
5	Thailand Olympic	4	0	0	4	2	9	−7	0	

Source: RSSSF

11 August 1992	Malaysia	1–0	Australia	Jakarta, Indonesia
	Ravindran 70'	Report		Stadium: Senayan Main Stadium

14 August 1992	Indonesia	0–3	Australia	Jakarta, Indonesia
		Report	Edwards 63'; Gray 71'; Wade 84'	Stadium: Senayan Main Stadium

=== Men's under-23 ===
==== Results and fixtures ====
===== 1992 Summer Olympics =====
====== Group D ======
Pos	Team	Pld	W	D	L	GF	GA	GD	Pts	Qualification
1	Ghana	3	1	2	0	4	2	+2	4	Advance to knockout stage
2	Australia	3	1	1	1	5	4	+1	3	Advance to knockout stage
3	Mexico	3	0	3	0	3	3	0	3	
4	Denmark	3	0	2	1	1	4	−3	2	

Source: RSSSF

26 July 1992	Ghana	3–1	Australia	Sabadell, Spain
	Gargo 12'; Ayew 83', 89'	Report	Vidmar 90+1'	Stadium: Nova Creu Alta Stadium; Attendance: 4,000; Referee: Ali Bujsaim (United Arab Emirates)

28 July 1992	Mexico	1–1	Australia	Barcelona, Spain
	Castañeda 63'	Report	Arambasic 20'	Stadium: Sarrià Stadium; Attendance: 4,000; Referee: Kiichiro Tachi (Japan)

30 July 1992	Denmark	0–3	Australia	Zaragoza, Spain
		Report	Markovski 32'; Mori 60'; Vidmar 75'	Stadium: La Romareda; Attendance: 4,000; Referee: Fabio Baldas (Italy)

====== Knockout stage ======
2 August 1992 Quarter-finals	Sweden	1–2	Australia	Barcelona, Spain
		Report	Markovski 32'; Mori 60'; Vidmar 75'	Stadium: Camp Nou; Attendance: 30,000; Referee: Arturo Brizio Carter (Mexico)

5 August 1992 Semi-finals	Poland	6–1	Australia	Barcelona, Spain
	Kowalczyk 27', 88'; Juskowiak 43', 52', 78'; Murphy 67' (o.g.)	Report	Veart 35'	Stadium: Camp Nou; Attendance: 45,000; Referee: Márcio Rezende de Freitas (Brazil)

7 August 1992 Bronze medal match	Australia	0–1	Ghana	Barcelona, Spain
		Report	Asare 19'	Stadium: Camp Nou; Attendance: 15,000; Referee: Manuel Díaz Vega (Spain)

=== Men's under-20 ===
==== Results and fixtures ====
===== 1993 FIFA World Youth Championship =====
====== Group D ======
Pos	Team	Pld	W	D	L	GF	GA	GD	Pts	Qualification
1	Russia	3	2	0	1	6	4	+2	4	Advance to knockout stage
2	Australia (H)	3	2	0	1	5	4	+1	4	Advance to knockout stage
3	Cameroon	3	1	0	2	4	5	−1	2	
4	Colombia	3	1	0	2	5	7	−2	2	

Source: RSSSF
(H) Hosts

5 March 1993	Australia	2–1	Colombia	Sydney, Australia
20:30 AEDT	Milicic 39'; Muscat 78'	Report	Zambrano 35'	Stadium: Sydney Football Stadium; Attendance: 31,883; Referee: Kim Milton Nielsen (Denmark)

8 March 1993	Australia	3–1	Russia	Sydney, Australia
20:30 AEDT	Magomedov 12' (o.g.); Milicic 69'; Agostino 81'	Report	Chudin 18'	Stadium: Sydney Football Stadium; Attendance: 18,982; Referee: Rodrigo Badilla (Costa Rica)

11 March 1993	Australia	0–2	Cameroon	Sydney, Australia
20:30 AEDT		Report	Tchoutang 44'; Embé 90'	Stadium: Sydney Football Stadium; Attendance: 27,581; Referee: Renato Marsiglia (Brazi)

====== Knockout stage ======
13 March 1993 Quarter-finals	Uruguay	1–2 (a.e.t.)	Australia	Brisbane, Australia
18:15 AEST	Sena Lamela 21'	Report	Agostino 59'; Carbone 99'	Stadium: Lang Park; Attendance: 14,000; Referee: Rémi Harrel (France)

17 March 1993 Semi-finals	Australia	0–2	Brazil	Melbourne, Australia
18:30 AEDT		Report	Marcelinho 77'; Catê 89'	Stadium: Olympic Park; Attendance: 22,100; Referee: Hellmut Krug (Germany)

20 March 1993 Third place play-off	England	2–1	Australia	Sydney, Australia
16:30 AEDT	Unsworth 39'; Joachim 85'	Report	Milicic 52'	Stadium: Sydney Football Stadium; Attendance: 40,015; Referee: Letchmanasamy Kathirveloo (Malaysia)

== Domestic soccer ==
=== National Soccer League ===
Pos	Team	Pld	W	D	L	GF	GA	GD	Pts	Qualification or relegation
1	South Melbourne	26	18	4	4	51	23	+28	58	Qualification for the Finals series
2	Marconi Fairfield (C)	26	17	2	7	57	31	+26	53	Qualification for the Finals series
3	Adelaide City	26	12	5	9	37	34	+3	41	Qualification for the Finals series
4	Wollongong City	26	11	6	9	33	27	+6	39	Qualification for the Finals series
5	West Adelaide	26	12	3	11	43	39	+4	39	Qualification for the Finals series
6	Parramatta Eagles	26	11	6	9	39	41	−2	39	Qualification for the Finals series
7	Sydney CSC	26	12	3	11	36	41	−5	39	
8	Newcastle Breakers	26	10	8	8	38	29	+9	38	
9	Sydney Olympic	26	10	4	12	36	31	+5	34	
10	Melbourne Croatia	26	10	4	12	38	39	−1	34	
11	Heidelberg United	26	7	9	10	30	40	−10	30	
12	Morwell Falcons	26	7	7	12	29	43	−14	28	
13	Preston Makedonia (R)	26	6	4	16	28	45	−17	18 (Note: Preston Makedonia deducted 4 points for crowd disturbances.)	Relegation to the Victorian Premier League
14	Brisbane United	26	5	3	18	32	64	−32	18	

Updated to match(es) played on unknown. Source: rsssf.com
Rules for classification: 1) points; 2) goal difference; 3) number of goals scored.
(C) Champions; (R) Relegated

=== NSL Cup ===
==== Final ====
18 April 1993

Heidelberg United	2–1	Parramatta Eagles
Scott 3'; Souris 87' (o.g.)	Report	Reda 80'

Marconi Stadium, Sydney
Attendance: 2,596
Referee: Rob Davies
