= Arild (given name) =

Arild is a common masculine Norwegian given name. Notable people with the name include:

- Arild Amundsen (1910–1988), Norwegian sailor
- Arild Andersen (born 1945), Norwegian jazz musician bassist
- Arild Andersen (cyclist) (1928–1997), Norwegian professional racing cyclist
- Arild Andersen (footballer) (born 1972), Norwegian footballer
- Arild Andresen (sportsman) (1928–2008), Norwegian football and ice hockey player
- Arild Andresen (director) (born 1967), Norwegian film director
- Arild Arnardo (1942–2020), Norwegian circus director
- Arild Aspøy (born 1958), Norwegian journalist, writer, director and editor
- Arild Berg (1975–2019), Norwegian footballer
- Arild Gulden (1941–2024), Norwegian international handball and football player
- Arild Haugen (born 1985), Norwegian strength athlete and boxer
- Arild Hermstad (born 1966), Norwegian politician
- Arild Hetleøen (1942–2023), Norwegian footballer
- Arild Hiim (1945–2024), Norwegian politician
- Arild Holm (1942–2024), Norwegian alpine skier
- Arild Huitfeldt (1546–1609), Danish historian and state official
- Arild Kristo (1939–2010), Norwegian photographer, graphic designer, actor, and filmmaker
- Arild Linneberg (born 1952), Norwegian researcher of literature, literary critic, essayist, and translator
- Arild Mathisen (born 1942), Norwegian footballer
- Arild Mentzoni (born 1945), Norwegian meteorologist and weather presenter
- Arild Midthun (born 1964), Norwegian illustrator, cartoonist, and comics artist
- Arild Moe (born 1955), Norwegian political scientist
- Arild Monsen (born 1962), Norwegian cross-country skier
- Arild Nyquist (1937–2004), Norwegian novelist, poet, writer of children's books, and musician
- Arild Olsen (born 1952), Norwegian footballer
- Arild Østbø (born 1991), Norwegian footballer
- Arild Østin Ommundsen (born 1969), Norwegian film director and screenwriter
- Arild Retvedt Øyen (born 1946), Norwegian veterinarian, and diplomat
- Arild Rosenkrantz (1870–1964), Danish nobleman painter, sculptor, stained glass artist, and illustrator
- Arild Rypdal (1934–2015), Norwegian author, pilot and engineer
- Arild Sibbern (1785–1863), Norwegian military officer and representative at the Norwegian Constituent Assembly
- Arild Stavrum (born 1972), Norwegian novelist, football coach and former player
- Arild Stokkan-Grande (born 1978), Norwegian politician
- Arild Sundgot (born 1978), Norwegian footballer
- Arild Underdal (1946–2025), Norwegian political scientist

== Middle name ==
- Bjørn Arild Gram (born 1972), Norwegian politician
- Knut Arild Hareide (born 1972), Norwegian politician
- Finn Arild Hvistendahl (born 1942), Norwegian businessperson
- Odd Arild Kvaløy (born 1948), Norwegian politician
- Stig Arild Råket (born 1978), Norwegian footballer
- Odd Arild Skonhoft (born 1973), Norwegian footballer
- Stig Arild Slørdahl (born 1959), Norwegian physician
