= 1992 UEFA European Under-18 Championship =

U-18-Fußball-Europameisterschaft 1992

Tournament details
- Host country: Germany
- Dates: 20–25 July
- Teams: 8

Final positions
- Champions: Turkey (1st title)
- Runners-up: Portugal
- Third place: Norway
- Fourth place: England

Tournament statistics
- Matches played: 10
- Goals scored: 38 (3.8 per match)

The UEFA European Under-18 Championship 1992 Final Tournament was held in Germany. It also served as the European qualification for the 1993 FIFA World Youth Championship. Players born on or after 1 August 1973 were eligible to participate in this competition.

== Teams ==
The following teams qualified for the tournament:

- CIS (qualified as Soviet Union)
- England
- Germany (host, but still qualified)
- Hungary
- Norway
- Poland
- Portugal
- Turkey

== Quarterfinals ==
20 July 1992

Portugal	4 – 0	Germany
Kenedy 21'; Bambo 72'; Cardoso 75'; Nilton 90'	Report

Nürnberg
Referee: Pat Kelly (Republic of Ireland)
20 July 1992

Turkey	3 – 0	Hungary
Derelioğlu 40'; Kocabey 52', 59'	Report

Nördlingen
Referee: Ilkka Koho (Finland)
20 July 1992

England	3 – 1	Poland

Regensburg
Referee: Loizos Loizou (Cyprus)
20 July 1992

Norway	4 – 4	CIS
Penalties
	3 – 1

Hassfurt
Referee: Vassilios Nikakis (Greece)

== Semifinals ==
=== Places 5-8 ===
22 July 1992

Germany	3 – 2	Poland

Bamberg
Referee: Ilkka Koho (Finland)
22 July 1992

CIS	3 – 1	Hungary

Vestenbergsgreuth
Referee: Ion Craciunescu (Romania)

=== Places 1-4 ===
22 July 1992

Turkey	2 – 1	Norway
Köse 36'; Kocabey 44'	Report	30' Rannestad

Sepp Simon Stadion, Schwandorf
Referee: Eric Blareau (Belgium)
22 July 1992

Portugal	1 – 1	England
Kenedy 45'	Report	46' Pollock
Penalties
Andrade (penalty scored); Bambo (penalty scored); Paulo Ferreira (penalty scored); Pedro Henriques (penalty scored); Hugo Costa (penalty scored); Kenedy (penalty scored); Moisés (penalty scored); Nélson Morais (penalty scored); Nilton (penalty scored); Nuno Afonso (penalty scored); Poejo (penalty scored); Porfírio (penalty scored)	12 – 11	(penalty scored) Marvin Harriott; (penalty scored) Ian Pearce; (penalty scored) Andy Myers; (penalty scored) Jamie Pollock; (penalty scored) Darren Caskey; (penalty scored) Nick Barmby; (penalty scored) Chris Bart-Williams; (penalty scored) David Watson; (penalty scored) David Unsworth; (penalty scored) Jamie Pollock; (penalty scored) Alan Thompson (penalty missed)

Sachs-Stadion, Schweinfurt
Referee: Vassilios Nikakis (Greece)

== Third place match ==
25 July 1992

Norway	1 – 1	England
Penalties
	8 – 7

Amberg
Referee: Pat Kelly (Republic of Ireland)

== Final ==
25 July 1992

Turkey	2 – 1 (gg)	Portugal
Kocabey 18'; Alkan 98'	Report	43' Cardoso

Hans-Walter-Wild-Stadion, Bayreuth
Referee: Ion Craciunescu (Romania)

1992 UEFA European Under-18 Championship

Turkey
First title

== Qualification to World Youth Championship ==
The six best performing teams qualified for the 1993 FIFA World Youth Championship.

- CIS (as Russia)
- England
- Germany
- Norway
- Portugal
- Turkey

== See also ==
- 1992 UEFA European Under-18 Championship qualifying
