= List of Norway international footballers born outside Norway =

This is a list of Norway international footballers who were born or grew up outside Norway. Players born in or raised in other countries may qualify for the Norway national team through parents or grandparents, or through 8-years residency and subsequent naturalization as Norwegian citizens.

== Men ==
=== Naturalized citizens of Norway ===
Players in bold are currently playing for Norway. The list is updated as 24 September 2026.

No.	Name	Born	Place of birth	Origin	National career	Caps	Goals
1	Sigurd Wathne	1898	(Denmark) Copenhagen	Denmark	1918–1922	14	0
2	Espen Baardsen	1977	(United States) San Rafael	United States	1998–2000	4	0
3	Hai Ngoc Tran	1975	(Vietnam) Phan Thiết (Note: Born in Vietnam, when it was still part of South Vietnam)	Vietnam	1999	1	0
4	Karl Petter Løken	1966	(Sweden) Karlskoga	Sweden	1987–1995	36	1
5	Pa-Modou Kah	1967	(The Gambia) Banjul	Gambia	2001–2008	10	1
6	Ardian Gashi (Note: He switched to Kosovo in 2014)	1981	(Kosovo) Gjakova (Note: Born in Kosovo, when it was still part of Yugoslavia)	Kosovo	2004–2013	36	4
7	Runar Berg	1970	(Netherlands) The Hague (Note: Born in The Netherlands, when his father played professionally there at the time)	Norway	1994–2003	5	0
8	Hassan El Fakiri	1977	(Morocco) Amezzaourou	Morocco	2004–2006	6	0
9	Brede Hangeland	1981	(United States) Houston	United States	2002–2014	91	4
10	Tomasz Sokolowski	1985	(Poland) Szczecin	Poland	2006	1	0
11	Alexander Tettey	1986	(Ghana) Accra	Ghana	2007–2016	34	3
12	Tarik Elyounoussi	1969	(Morocco) Al Hoceima	Morocco	2008–2019	60	10
14	Lars-Christopher Vilsvik	1988	(Germany) West Berlin (Note: Born in Germany, when it was still part of West Germany)	Germany	2012–2013	5	0
15	Bjørn Johnsen	1991	(United States) New York City	United States	2017–2020	16	5
16	Mohamed Elyounoussi	1994	(Morocco) Al Hoceima	Morocco	2014–2024	55	10
17	**Erling Haaland**	2000	(England) Leeds (Note: Born in England, when his father played professionally there at the time)	England	2019–	55	62
18	**Brice Wembangomo**	1996	(Democratic Republic of the Congo) Kinshasa (Note: Born in Democratic Republic of the Congo, when it was still part of Zaire)	Democratic Republic of the Congo	2023–	1	0
19	**Colin Rösler**	2000	(Germany) Berlin	Germany	2024–	1	0
20	**Thelo Aasgaard**	2002	(England) Liverpool	England	2025–	9	6

The following players have chosen to represent Norwegian men's national team with this already being their primary nationality or gain their Norwegian citizenship through their parents who hold the latter nationality, although born elsewhere and eligible to represent other countries (i.e. parent's original country, nation of birth, etc.).

No.	Name	Born	Place of birth	Background(s)	National career	Caps	Goals
1	Vadim Demidov	1986	(Latvia) Riga (Note: Born in Latvia, when it was still part of Soviet Union)	Russia	2008–2014	16	0
3	Valon Berisha (Note: He switched to Kosovo in 2016)	1993	(Sweden) Malmö	Kosovo	2012–2016	20	0
3	**Tokmac Nguen**	1993	(Kenya) Kakuma	South Sudan; Ethiopia	2021–	1	9
4	**Hugo Vetlesen**	2000	(Belgium) Braine-l'Alleud	Belgium; France	2022–	6	1

=== Stats by country of birth ===
Country	Players
Morocco	3
United States	3
England	2
Sweden	2
Germany	2
Gambia	1
Ghana	1
Kenya	1
Kosovo	1
Latvia	1
Democratic Republic of the Congo	1
Vietnam	1
Netherlands	1
Belgium	1
Poland	1
