= Potekhin =

Potekhin (Russian: Потехин) is a surname. It may refer to:

- Aleksei Potekhin (born 1972), Russian pop musician
- Alexei Potekhin (1829–1908), Russian dramatist and novelist
- Bogdan Potekhin (born 1992), Russian professional ice hockey player
- Vasili Potekhin (born 1974), retired Russian professional footballer
