= Yan Razera =

Brazilian football manager

Yan
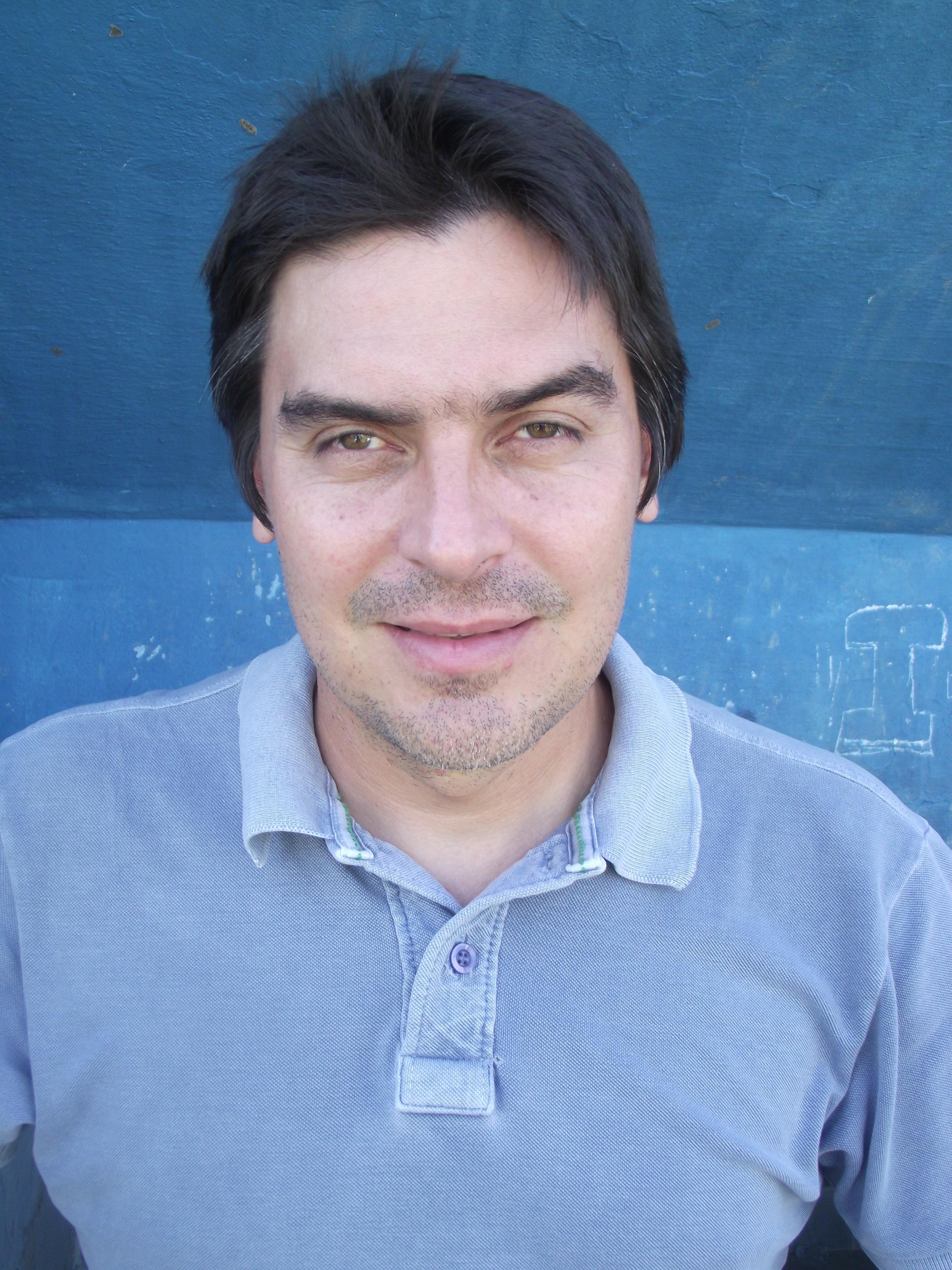

Personal information
- Full name: Yan Cleiton de Lima Razera
- Date of birth: 1 May 1975 (age 51)
- Place of birth: Pinhalzinho, Brazil
- Height: 1.72 m (5 ft 8 in)
- Position: Midfielder

Youth career
- 1989–1993: Vasco da Gama

Senior career*
Years	Team	Apps	(Gls)
1993–1995	Vasco da Gama	81	(7)
1996	Internacional	24	(5)
1997–2002	Fluminense	113	(18)
1998–1999	→ Coritiba (loan)	27	(4)
2003	Náutico		
2003	Flamengo	7	(0)
2004	Al Khaleej		
2004	Grêmio	13	(0)
2005	Avaí		
2006	Penafiel	2	(0)
2006	Macaé		
2007	Jataiense		
2007	Bacabal		
2008	América de Natal		
2008	Bacabal		
2009	Tigres do Brasil	3	(0)
2010	Votoraty	8	(0)

International career
1991	Brazil U17		
1992–1993	Brazil U20		
1995	Brazil	1	(0)

Managerial career
- 2010: Votoraty (assistant)
- 2011: Botafogo-SP (assistant)
- 2012: São Pedro-RJ
- Chapecoense U13
- Chapecoense U15
- 2019–2020: Chapecoense U17
- 2021: Chapecoense U17
- 2021: Santos (assistant)
- 2021: Vasco da Gama (assistant)
- * Club domestic league appearances and goals

Yan Cleiton de Lima Razera (born 1 May 1975), simply known as Yan, is a Brazilian football manager and former player who played as a midfielder.

== Playing career ==
=== Club ===
Born in Pinhalzinho, Santa Catarina, Yan finished his formation with Vasco da Gama. After making his first team debut in 1993, he was a regular starter in the following years before joining Internacional in 1996.

Yan signed for Fluminense in 1997, but was loaned to Coritiba in the following year. Back at Flu in 1999, he helped the club in their Campeonato Brasileiro Série C win and remained at the club until 2002.

After leaving Fluminense, Yan never settled for a club, representing Náutico, Flamengo, Al Khaleej, Grêmio, Avaí, Penafiel, Macaé, Jataiense, Bacabal (two spells), América de Natal, Tigres do Brasil and Votoraty. He retired with the latter in 2010, aged 35.

=== International ===
Yan represented Brazil at under-17 and under-20 levels, winning the 1993 FIFA World Youth Championship with the latter. He made his full international debut on 22 February 1995, replacing Souza in a 5–0 friendly routing of Slovakia.

== Post-playing career ==
Immediately after retiring, Yan became Fernando Diniz's assistant coach at his last club Votoraty. After being Diniz's assistant at Botafogo-SP, he was named manager of São Pedro-RJ in the place of Valdir Bigode in March 2012.

Subsequently, Yan was a manager of Chapecoense's under-13, under-15 and under-17 categories. On 18 July 2021, he reunited with Diniz after being named his assistant at Santos.

== Career statistics ==
Club	Season	League			State League		Cup		Continental		Other		Total	
Club	Season	Division	Apps	Goals	Apps	Goals	Apps	Goals	Apps	Goals	Apps	Goals	Apps	Goals
Vasco da Gama	1993	Série A	9	1	10	0	—		1 (Note: Appearance(s) in Copa CONMEBOL)	0	2 (Note: Appearance(s) in Torneio Rio – São Paulo)	0	22	1
Vasco da Gama	1994	Série A	18	0	11	3	8	0	—		—		37	3
Vasco da Gama	1995	Série A	9	0	24	3	8	1	—		—		41	4
Vasco da Gama	Total		36	1	45	6	16	0	1	0	2	0	99	8
Internacional	1996	Série A	9	1	15	4	3	0	—		—		27	4
Fluminense	1997	Série A	21	5	14	2	2	0	—		—		37	7
Fluminense	1998	Série B	0	0	10	2	2	0	—		6	0	18	2
Fluminense	1999	Série C	15	3	—		—		—		—		15	3
Fluminense	2000	Copa João Havelange	12	0	8	1	6	1	—		2	0	28	2
Fluminense	2001	Série A	6	2	9	2	2	0	—		3	0	17	4
Fluminense	2002	Série A	18	1	0	0	0	0	—		0	0	18	1
Fluminense	Total		72	11	41	7	12	1	—		11	0	136	19
Coritiba (loan)	1998	Série A	8	0	—		—		—		—		8	0
Coritiba (loan)	1999	Série A	5	1	14	3	2	0	—		—		21	4
Coritiba (loan)	Total		13	1	14	3	2	0	—		—		29	4
Flamengo	2003	Série A	7	0	—		—		—		—		7	0
Grêmio	2004	Série A	13	0	—		—		1 (Note: Appearance(s) in Copa Sudamericana)	0	—		14	0
Penafiel	2005–06	Primeira Liga	2	0	—		—		—		—		2	0
Tigres do Brasil	2009	Carioca	—		3	0	—		—		—		3	0
Votoraty	2010	Paulista A2	—		8	0	—		—		—		8	0
Career total			28	2	91	5	3	0	0	0	5	0	127	7

== Honours ==
=== Player ===
Vasco da Gama

- Campeonato Carioca: 1993, 1994

Coritiba

- Campeonato Paranaense: 1999

Fluminense

- Campeonato Brasileiro Série C: 1999
- Campeonato Carioca: 2002

=== Internacional ===
Brazil U20

- FIFA U-20 World Cup: 1993
