= Sergey Aleksandrov =

Sergey Aleksandrov may refer to:

- Sergey Alexandrov (politician), the First Secretary of the Communist Party of the Soviet Union (2001)
- Sergei Aleksandrov (footballer, born 1973), Russian association football player
- Sergey Alexandrov (ice hockey) (born 1978), Kazakhstani ice hockey player
- Serghei Alexandrov (born 1965), Moldovan international footballer
