= Rune Nordengen =

Norwegian footballer (born 1974)

Rune Nordengen (born 12 May 1974) is a retired Norwegian football midfielder.

He represented Norway U19 and U20 in 1992 and 1993, being a squad member for the 1993 FIFA World Youth Championship.

Hailing from Gjerdrum and Gjerdrum IL, he went to Lillestrøm SK while a youth player. He was drafted into the first-team squad in 1993, but only recorded a single league game, in 1994. In 1995 he was loaned out to Åndalsnes IF. In 1996 and 1997 he played for Lyn without establishing himself in the starting eleven. He then retired from professional football, featuring for Gjerdrum IL lowly in the league pyramid.
