= Daniel Vélez =

Colombian footballer (1973–2021)

Personal information
- Full name: Daniel Antonio Vélez Maya
- Date of birth: 8 October 1973
- Place of birth: Medellín, Colombia
- Date of death: 23 June 2021 (aged 47)
- Place of death: Medellín, Colombia
- Height: 1.80 m (5 ft 11 in)
- Position: Goalkeeper

Senior career*
Years	Team	Apps	(Gls)
1993	Once Caldas		
1994–1995	Independiente Medellín		
2006	Atlético Bucaramanga		
2008	Alianza Petrolera		
2009–2010	Santa Fe	2	(0)
- Deportivo Pereira
- Envigado
- Portuguesa
- Guaros

International career
1993	Colombia U20		
- * Club domestic league appearances and goals

Daniel Vélez (8 October 1973 – 23 June 2021) was a Colombian professional footballer who played as a goalkeeper.

== Career ==
Born in Medellín, Vélez played for Once Caldas, Independiente Medellín, Atlético Bucaramanga, Alianza Petrolera, Santa Fe (winning the 2009 Copa Colombia), Deportivo Pereira and Envigado, as well as two clubs in Venezuela, Portuguesa and Guaros.

He also represented the Colombia under-20 team, playing for them at the 1992 South American U-20 Championship and the 1993 FIFA World Youth Championship.

On 23 June 2021, Vélez died of COVID-19.
