= Nikolai Golubkin =

Russian footballer

Personal information
- Full name: Nikolai Nikolayevich Golubkin
- Date of birth: 6 September 1974 (age 52)
- Place of birth: Magnitogorsk, Russian SFSR
- Height: 1.85 m (6 ft 1 in)
- Position: Defender

Youth career
- RO UOR Rostov-on-Don

Senior career*
Years	Team	Apps	(Gls)
1991–1993	FC Rostselmash Rostov-on-Don	18	(0)
1992–1993	→ FC Rostselmash-2 Rostov-on-Don (loan)	19	(1)
1994	FC Lada Tolyatti	3	(0)
1995–1996	FC Rostselmash Rostov-on-Don	21	(1)
1996	→ FC Rostselmash-2 Rostov-on-Don (loan)	10	(1)
1997	FC Magnitka Magnitogorsk	25	(5)
1998–1999	FC Kuban Krasnodar	19	(2)
1999	FC Nemkom Krasnodar		
2003–2005	FC Dynamo Krasnodar		
2006–2007	FC Dynamo Stavropol	52	(2)
2008	FC Stavros Vityazevo		
2011–2012	FC Yubileyny Krasnodar		
- * Club domestic league appearances and goals

Nikolai Nikolayevich Golubkin (Russian: Николай Николаевич Голубкин; born 6 September 1974) is a former Russian football player.

He represented Russia at the 1993 FIFA World Youth Championship.
