= List of English football transfers winter 2003–04 =

This is a list of English football transfers for the 2003–04 winter transfer window. Only moves featuring at least one Premier League or First Division club are listed.

The winter transfer window opened on 1 January 2004, although a few transfers took place prior to that date. Players without a club could join one at any time, either during or in between transfer windows. Clubs below Premier League level could also sign players on loan at any time. If need be, clubs could sign a goalkeeper on an emergency loan, if all others were unavailable.

== Post-window signings ==
1 September

- (Scotland) Neil Sullivan from Tottenham Hotspur to Chelsea, free
- (Scotland) James McFadden from (Scotland) Motherwell to Everton, £1.25m
- (England) Nigel Martyn from Leeds United to Everton, Nominal
- (Republic of Ireland) Kevin Kilbane from Sunderland to Everton, £750,000
- (Wales) Mark Pembridge from Everton to Fulham, £500,000

== January transfers ==
The transfer window re-opened on 1 January 2004 for clubs in the top two divisions. It remained open until 00:00 GMT on 1 September 2004.

Date	Name	Nat	Moving from	Moving to	Fee

1 January 2004

- (England) Michael Brown from Sheffield United to Tottenham Hotspur, £100,000

2 January 2004

- (France) Fabien Barthez from Manchester United to (France) Olympique de Marseille, season-long loan
- (Greece) Nikos Dabizas from Newcastle United to Leicester City, free

6 January 2004

- (Finland) Peter Enckelman from Aston Villa to Blackburn Rovers, £150,000

9 January 2004

- (Israel) Eyal Berkovic from Manchester City to Portsmouth, free

12 January 2004

- (England) Alan Wright from Middlesbrough to Sheffield United, free

14 January 2004

- (England) David James from West Ham United to Manchester City, £2m

17 January 2004

- (Wales) Andy Melville from Fulham to West Ham United, swap deal with Ian Pearce

20 January 2004

- (England) Ian Pearce from West Ham United to Fulham, swap deal with Andy Melville

23 January 2004

- (France) Louis Saha from Fulham to Manchester United, £12.82m

21 January 2004

- (Germany) Moritz Volz from Arsenal to Fulham, Nominal

22 January 2004

- (England) Nigel Reo-Coker from Wimbledon to West Ham United, Undisclosed

25 January 2004

- (England) Carl Cort from Newcastle United to Wolverhampton Wanderers, £2m

27 January 2004

- (Spain) José Antonio Reyes from (Spain) Sevilla to Arsenal, £10.5m
- (England) Michael Gray from Sunderland to Blackburn Rovers, free

29 January 2004

- (Peru) Nolberto Solano from Newcastle United to Aston Villa, £1.5m

30 January 2004

- (England) Scott Parker from Charlton Athletic to Chelsea, £10m
- (Croatia) Ivica Mornar from (Belgium) RSC Anderlecht to Portsmouth, Undisclosed
- (Brazil) Ricardinho from (Brazil) Sao Pãulo to Middlesbrough, Free

2 February 2004

- (England) Jerome Thomas from Arsenal to Charlton Athletic, £100,000
- (England) Martin Taylor from Blackburn Rovers to Birmingham City, £1.25m
- (England) Jon Stead from Huddersfield Town to Blackburn Rovers, £1.25m
- (England) Jermain Defoe from West Ham United to Tottenham Hotspur, £7m
- (England) Bobby Zamora from Tottenham Hotspur to West Ham United, Swap for Defoe
