= Brede Skorve =

Norwegian footballer (born 1973)

Personal information
- Date of birth: 14 November 1973 (age 52)
- Position: Defender

Youth career
- Sogndal

Senior career*
Years	Team	Apps	(Gls)
1992–1996	Sogndal		
1997	Manglerud Star		
1998–1999	Nest-Sotra		
2001–2002	Frøya		

International career
1989	Norway u-16	4	(0)
1990	Norway u-17	3	(1)
1991	Norway u-18	9	(0)
1992	Norway u-19	4	(0)
1993	Norway u-20	4	(0)
- * Club domestic league appearances and goals

Brede Skorve (born 16 August 1973) is a retired Norwegian football defender.

He came up in the club Sogndal IL and represented Norway numerous times from u-16 through u-20 level, including as a squad member at the 1993 FIFA World Youth Championship. He was drafted into the first-team squad in 1992, and got 8 Eliteserien matches in 1992 and 1994.

After the 1996 season he started studying and played briefly for Manglerud Star before joining IL Nest-Sotra in 1998. He retired ahead of the 2000 season, but in 2001 he made an amateur comeback with IL Frøya, staying a couple of seasons there.
