= Dietmar Hummel =

German footballer

Personal information
- Date of birth: 20 October 1973 (age 53)
- Place of birth: Germany
- Height: 1.90 m (6 ft 3 in)
- Position: Goalkeeper

Team information
- Current team: FSV Rot-Weiss Stegen

Youth career
- –1986: FSV Rot-Weiss Stegen
- 1986–1993: SC Freiburg

Senior career*
Years	Team	Apps	(Gls)
1993–1998	SC Freiburg	9	(0)
1998–1999	Karlsruher SC	0	(0)
1999–2000	Dynamo Dresden	0	(0)
2000–2002	VfR Mannheim	6	(0)
Total		15	(0)

International career
- Germany U-20
- * Club domestic league appearances and goals

Dietmar Hummel (born 20 October 1973) is a German former professional footballer who played as a goalkeeper.
