= Manfred Burghartswieser =

German former footballer

Personal information
- Date of birth: 23 August 1973 (age 53)
- Place of birth: Burghausen, West Germany
- Height: 1.80 m (5 ft 11 in)
- Position: Defensive midfielder

Youth career
- –1992: Bayern Munich

Senior career*
Years	Team	Apps	(Gls)
1992–1994	Bayern Munich (A)		
1994–1995	1860 Munich (A)		
1995–1999	FC Augsburg	102	(8)
1999–2003	Wacker Burghausen	91	(4)
2003–2010	TSV 1860 Rosenheim		

International career
1992–1993	Germany U-19	7	(0)
1994	Germany U-21	2	(0)

Managerial career
- 2007–2010: TSV 1860 Rosenheim (player-coach)
- 2012–2013: SB Rosenheim
- * Club domestic league appearances and goals

Manfred Burghartswieser (born 23 August 1973) is a German former professional footballer who played as a midfielder.
