= Carlos Montoya (footballer) =

Peruvian footballer (born 2002)

Personal information
- Full name: Carlos Joao Montoya García
- Date of birth: 4 May 2002 (age 24)
- Place of birth: Lima, Peru
- Height: 1.78 m (5 ft 10 in)
- Position: Defender

Team information
- Current team: Alianza Lima
- Number: 26

Youth career
- –2017: Sporting Cristal
- 2018–2019: Cantolao
- 2019–2020: Alianza Lima

Senior career*
Years	Team	Apps	(Gls)
2020–	Alianza Lima	4	(0)

International career^{‡}
2019	Peru U17	9	(0)
2022–	Peru U23	1	(0)
- * Club domestic league appearances and goals as of 05:00, 1 October 2020 (UTC) ‡ National team caps and goals as of 05:00, 1 September 2022 (UTC)

Carlos Joao Montoya García (born 4 May 2002) is a Peruvian footballer who plays as a defender for Alianza Lima.

== Career statistics ==
=== Club ===
As of 23 September 2023.

Club	Division	League			Cup		Continental		Total	
Club	Division	Season	Apps	Goals	Apps	Goals	Apps	Goals	Apps	Goals
Alianza Lima	Peruvian Primera División	2020	11	0	0	0	1	0	12	0
Alianza Lima	Peruvian Primera División	2021	9	0	0	0	0	0	9	0
Alianza Lima	Peruvian Primera División	2022	1	0	0	0	0	0	1	0
Alianza Lima	Peruvian Primera División	2023	4	0	0	0	1	0	5	0
Alianza Lima	Total		25	0	0	0	2	0	27	0
Cantolao	Peruvian Primera División	2023	12	0	0	0	0	0	12	0
Career total			37	0	0	0	2	0	39	0
