= Paulo Morais =

Portuguese footballer

Personal information
- Full name: Paulo Jorge Matos Morais
- Date of birth: 10 August 1974 (age 52)
- Place of birth: Portugal
- Position: Goalkeeper

Youth career
- Benfica Corvense
- 1986-1993: Sporting CP

Senior career*
Years	Team	Apps	(Gls)
1993-1994	Sporting CP	0	(0)
1994-1996	G.D. Estoril Praia	51	(0)
1996-1997	C.D. Beja	15	(0)
1997-2001	S.C. Braga	6	(0)
2001-2002	S.C. Campomaiorense	2	(0)
2002-2003	F.C. Marco	0	(0)
2003-2004	Moura AC		
2004-2005	F.C. da Madalena		
2005	GD Peniche		
2006	F.C. Oliveira do Hospital	15	(0)
2006	A.D. Carregado		
2007	Estrela de Vendas Novas	7	(0)
2008–2009	F.C. da Madalena	4	(0)
2009-2012	Operário FC Lisboa		
2012-2013	Fayal		
2013-2014	GD Cedrense		
2014-2015	Fayal		
2015-2016	Futebol Clube dos Flamengos		
- * Club domestic league appearances and goals

Paulo Morais (born 10 August 1974) is a Portuguese retired footballer.
