= São Pedro Atlético Clube =

Brazilian multi-sports club based in Rio de Janeiro (state)

São Pedro
- Full name: São Pedro Atlético Clube
- Nickname: Camarão
- Founded: 16 May 2011; 14 years ago
- Stadium: Estádio Waldemar Tadio

The São Pedro Atlético Clube is a Brazilian multi-sports club, founded on May 16, 2011, based in São Pedro da Aldeia, in the state of Rio de Janeiro.

== History ==
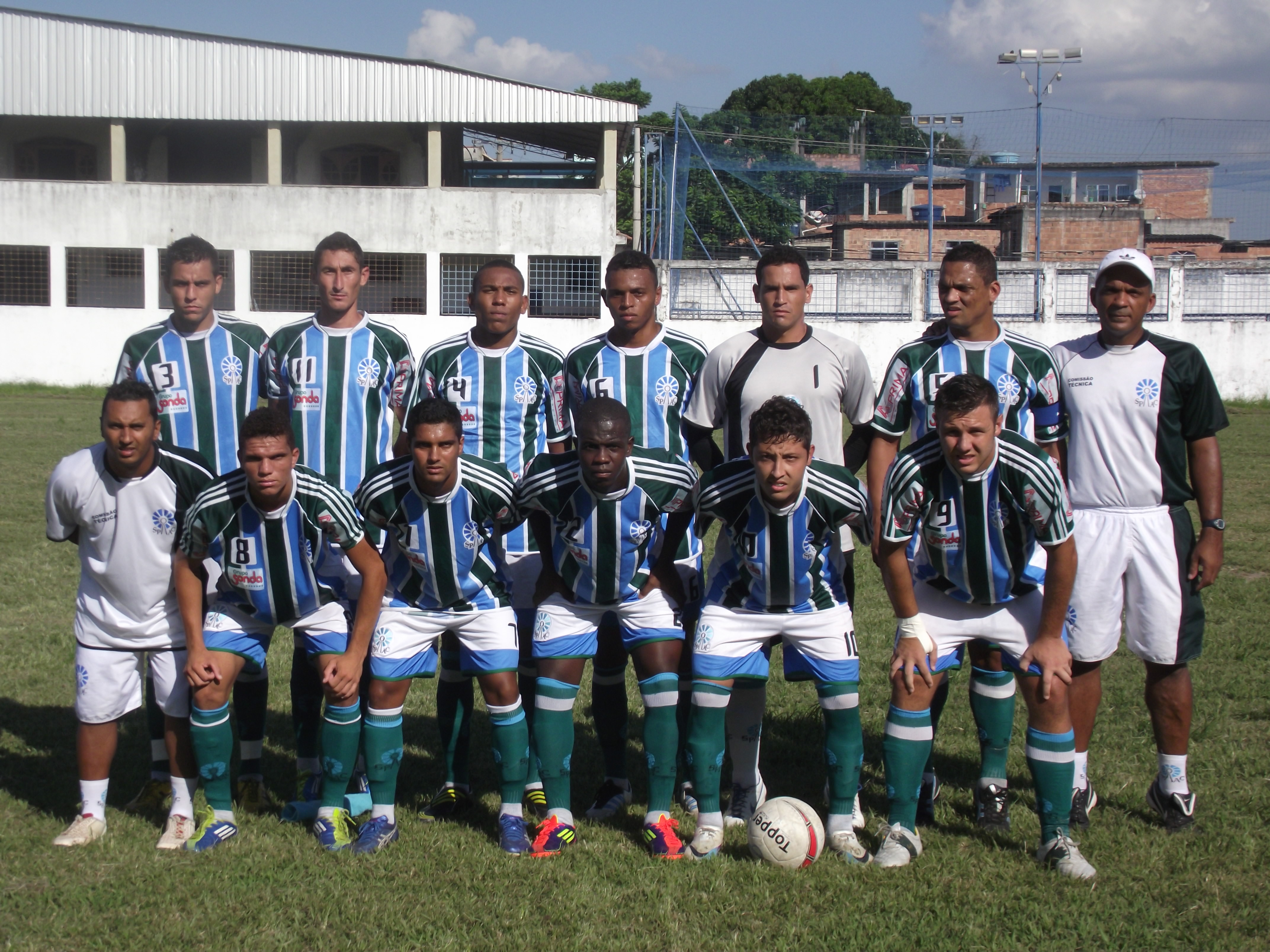
São Pedro's squad in 2012

São Pedro Atlético Clube, from the city of São Pedro da Aldeia (Região dos Lagos do Rio de Janeiro), was founded in the first half of 2011. The project debuted on June 29, Saint Peter's Day, with a friendly match at which some football stars who shone for a long time on the national scene, led by Valdir Bigode (who would become the first coach in the club's history) helped to brighten the celebrations of the city's patron saint. Held at the Waldemar Tadio Stadium, owned by São Pedro Esporte Clube, the event was attended by then-mayor Carlindo Filho, who promised that the city council would "spare no effort to create a good squad".

He debuted in professional football in Serie C of the 2012 Campeonato Carioca (currently Serie B1). In the first three matches, the team was led by Valdir Bigode, recording two wins and a draw. However, after a meeting with the board, the former player chose to leave the club after disagreeing with the ideology presented by the directors, who sought to clarify the roles of the administrative part and the coach, in order to avoid the accumulation of functions. Under Yan's command, São Pedro continued in Serie C and finished first in its group in both the first and second phases, but ended up being eliminated in the third phase after a goalless draw, in the last round, against Paduano.

In the following season, now led by Gilson Gênio, the São Pedro team narrowly missed out on gaining access: with the best campaign in the first phase, the Aldeense team advanced to the playoffs. In the first knockout match, they beat Mangaratibense 2–0, with two goals from Rafael Di María, and only needed a draw in the return game to be promoted. However, they ended up defeated 2–1 in Mangaratiba in normal time. As the Serie C regulations did not provide for goal difference as a tiebreaker, access was decided in a penalty shootout and the home team ended up winning 2–1. After the disappointment, coach Gilson Gênio was not approached by the board to renew and ended up leaving the club.

In the 2014 Serie C, the team finished in 8th place and, after the end of the competition, president Robson Maciel publicly considered the professional football license, citing a lack of resources and revealing that there was never a formal agreement with the city council. Despite the imminent crisis, São Pedro confirmed its ability to participate in the 2015 edition. Two weeks before the start of the tournament, however, the club had no squad, board, technical committee or even president: after the end of Maciel's term, no one took over afterwards. The first scheduled game, against Juventus, was suspended, but later, the club confirmed its withdrawal from the championship and was declared the loser of all matches by W.O..

Without competing in official competitions since then, São Pedro Atlético Clube was disaffiliated from the Federação de Futebol do Estado do Rio de Janeiro (FERJ) in November 2017, due to inactivity for a period of more than two years.

== See also ==
- Football in Rio de Janeiro
- Campeonato Carioca
