= Arild Mentzoni =

Norwegian meteorologist and weather presenter

Arild Øystein Mentzoni (born 20 September 1945) is a Norwegian meteorologist and weather presenter.

He was hired by the Norwegian Meteorological Institute, and became a prime-time weather presenter for the Norwegian Broadcasting Corporation in 1977. He retired in 2010, but continued working part-time for the Meteorological Institute.

He resides in Lørenskog.
