= Khalid Al-Rashaid =

Saudi Arabian footballer

Personal information
- Date of birth: 3 August 1974 (age 52)
- Position: Midfielder

International career
Years	Team	Apps	(Gls)
- Saudi Arabia

Khalid bin Nasser Al-Rashaid (Arabic: خالد بن ناصر الرشيد; born 3 August 1974) is a Saudi Arabian former footballer. He competed in the men's tournament at the 1996 Summer Olympics.
