= Arild Linneberg =

- Born: 26 January 1952 (age 73)
- Occupation: Researcher

Arild Linneberg (born 26 January 1952) is a Norwegian researcher of literature, literary critic, essayist and translator.

== Early life and career ==
He was born in Oslo, and is a Doctor of Philosophy by education. He became a lecturer at the University of Bergen in 1985, and was promoted to professor in 1992. In addition to his academic works, he has published essays as well as the satirical novel Ubehaget i kulturen together with Vigdis Hjorth in 1995.
