= Valdir Bigode =

Brazilian footballer

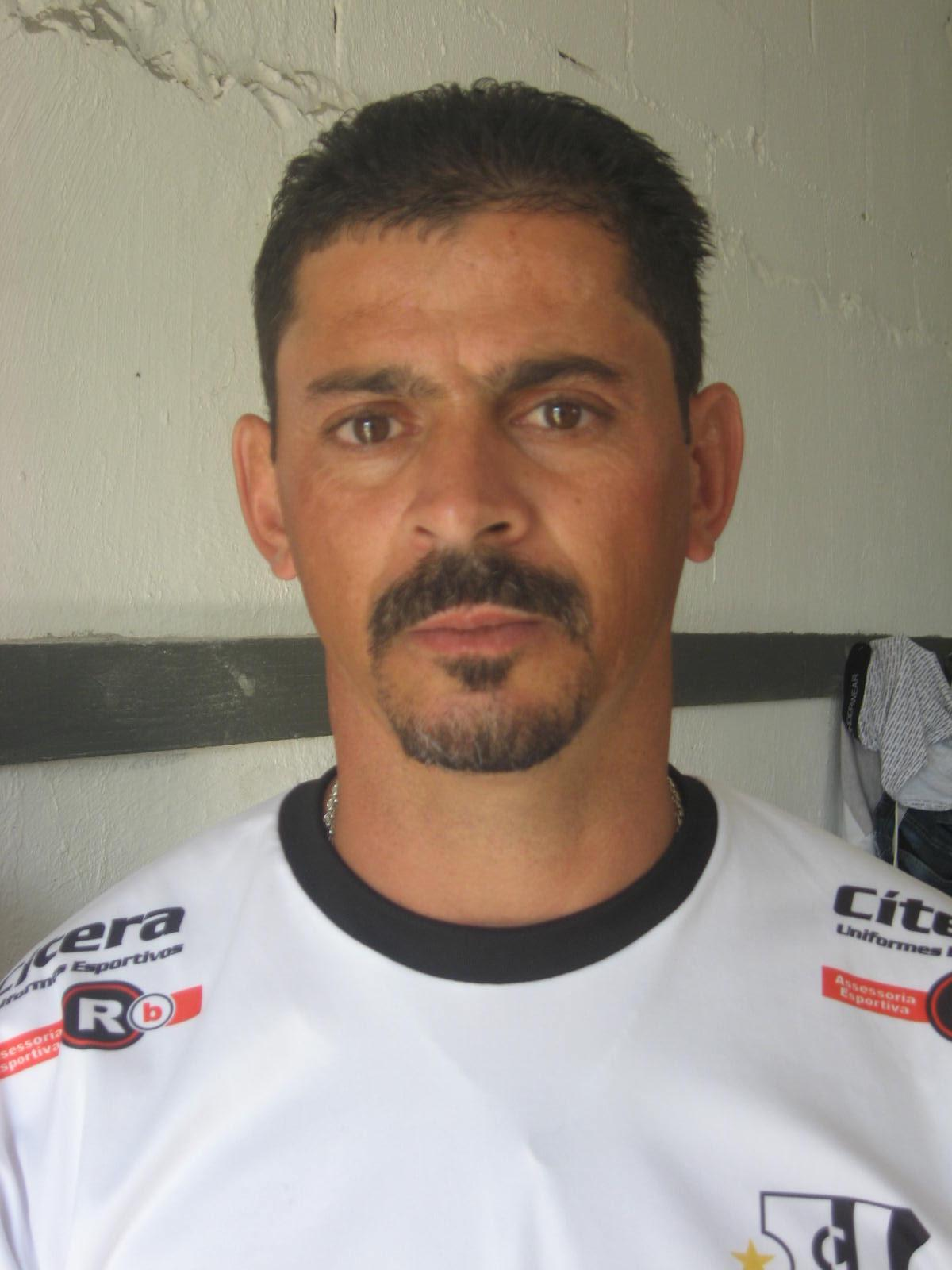

Personal information
- Full name: Valdir de Moraes Filho
- Date of birth: 15 March 1972 (age 54)
- Place of birth: Rio de Janeiro, Brazil
- Height: 1.80 m (5 ft 11 in)
- Position: Striker

Team information
- Current team: Vitória-ES (manager)

Youth career
- 1991: Campo Grande
- 1991−1992: Vasco da Gama

Senior career*
Years	Team	Apps	(Gls)
1992−1995	Vasco da Gama	292	(144)
1996	São Paulo	16	(10)
1997	→ Benfica (loan)	10	(3)
1997−1998	Atlético Mineiro	50	(33)
1999	Botafogo	20	(6)
2000	Santos		
2000−2001	Atlético Mineiro	9	(2)
2002−2004	Vasco da Gama	49	(18)
2004−2006	Al-Nasr SC	26	(25)
2006−2007	Dubai Club		
Total		237	(112)

Managerial career
- 2010–2011: Campo Grande
- 2011: Itaboraí
- 2012: São Pedro
- 2015−2018: Vasco da Gama (assistant)
- 2017−2018: Vasco da Gama (interim)
- 2019: Cabofriense
- 2019–: Vitória-ES
- * Club domestic league appearances and goals

Valdir de Moraes Filho (born 15 March 1972), commonly known as Valdir Bigode, is a Brazilian former football manager and former player.

A prolific striker, Valdir is the twelfth highest goalscorer of Vasco da Gama, with 135 goals in 267 matches, while also being a part of Atlético Mineiro history with 57 goals in 111 appearances.

== Career ==
Born in Rio de Janeiro, Valdir started at Campo Grande Atlético Clube, moving in the same year to Vasco da Gama. There, he was an important part in the conquest of the 1992 to 1994 editions of the Campeonato Carioca, often partnering with Mário Jardel.

In 1997, he passed through Portugal, scoring 5 goals in 13 appearances in the two and half months at Benfica, before returning to Brazil and being the top scorer of the 1997 Copa CONMEBOL won by Atlético Mineiro, partnering with Marques.

After that, he passed through Botafogo and Santos, without major success, before moving back to Atletico Mineiro in 2000. He then returned to Vasco da Gama, spending two seasons there and winning another Campeonato Carioca in 2003.

He then moved abroad again, joining Al-Nasr in Dubai, winning the topscorer award in 2004–05. His final year was in Saudi Arabia. Afterwards, he embarked on a managerial career, mainly at Vasco da Gama.
