= Sergei Aleksandrov (footballer, born 1973) =

Russian footballer (1973–2018)

Personal information
- Full name: Sergei Leonidovich Aleksandrov
- Date of birth: 7 December 1973
- Place of birth: Cheboksary, Russian SFSR
- Date of death: 21 February 2018 (aged 44)
- Height: 1.87 m (6 ft 1 1/2 in)
- Position: Goalkeeper

Senior career*
Years	Team	Apps	(Gls)
1990	FC Stal Cheboksary	2	(0)
1991–1993	FC Nyva Ternopil	13	(0)
1993	FC Lokomotiv Moscow	0	(0)
1993	→ FC Lokomotiv-d Moscow	16	(0)
1994	PFC Pirin Gotse Delchev		
1996	FC Kristall Sergach	19	(0)
1997–1998	FC Gazovik Orenburg	53	(0)
2000–2001	FC Luch Vladivostok	42	(0)
2003	FC Metallurg-Metiznik Magnitogorsk	12	(0)
2003	FC Torpedo Volzhsky	16	(0)
2004	FC Metallurg-Metiznik Magnitogorsk (D4)		
2005	FC Shakhtyor Peshelan		
2006	FC ZEiM-LAYN Cheboksary		
2006–2007	FC Shakhtyor Peshelan		
2008	FC Shakhtyor-Volga-D Peshelan (D4)		
2013–2014	FC Chuvashiya-DYuSSh Cheboksary (D4)		

International career
1992	Ukraine U21	1	(0)
1993	Russia U19	?	(?)
- * Club domestic league appearances and goals as of 30 April 2015

Sergei Leonidovich Aleksandrov (Russian: Сергей Леонидович Александров; Ukrainian: Сергій Леонідович Александров; 7 December 1973 – 21 February 2018) was a Russian football player.

In 1992, when a player of FC Nyva Ternopil, Aleksandrov represented Ukraine as part of Ukraine national under-21 football team in its first game on October 28 against Belarus in Ternopil.

He represented Russia at the 1993 FIFA World Youth Championship.
