= Hai Ngoc Tran =

Vietnamese-born Norwegian footballer (born 1975)

Personal information
- Full name: Hai Ngoc Tran
- Date of birth: 10 January 1975 (age 51)
- Place of birth: Phan Thiết, South Vietnam
- Height: 1.72 m (5 ft 7 1/2 in)
- Position: Defender

Senior career*
Years	Team	Apps	(Gls)
1992–1998	Kongsvinger IL	92	(0)
1998–2001	Vålerenga	54	(0)
2002	Kongsvinger IL	6	(1)
Total		152	(1)

International career
1989–1990	Norway U15	9	(0)
1990	Norway U16	7	(2)
1991–1992	Norway U17	11	(0)
1992–1994	Norway U18	9	(1)
1993	Norway U20	3	(0)
1994–1997	Norway U21	38	(0)
1998	Norway U23	2	(0)
1999	Norway	1	(0)
- * Club domestic league appearances and goals

Hai Ngoc Tran (Vietnamese: Trần Ngọc Hải, born 10 January 1975) is a Norwegian former footballer who played as a defender.

== Club career ==
He played professionally in Norway for Kongsvinger IL and Vålerenga.

== International career ==
Tran was a youth international for Norway, whom he represented at the 1993 FIFA World Youth Championship. He earned one cap for the senior team in 1999.

== Personal life ==
Born in Phan Thiết, South Vietnam four months before the Fall of Saigon, Tran came to Norway as a refugee in 1982. He now owns a restaurant in Kongsvinger.
