= Paulo Ferreira (footballer, born 1973) =

Portuguese footballer

Personal information
- Full name: Paulo Alexandre Marques Ferreira
- Date of birth: 14 September 1973 (age 53)
- Place of birth: Lisbon, Portugal
- Height: 1.80 m (5 ft 11 in)
- Position: Forward

Youth career
- 1985–1988: Sporting
- 1988–1989: Damaiense
- 1989–1992: Estrela da Amadora

Senior career*
Years	Team	Apps	(Gls)
1992–1999	Estrela da Amadora	127	(10)
1999–2000	Porto B	5	(1)
2000	→ Farense (loan)	14	(2)
2000–2001	Estrela da Amadora	16	(1)
2001–2002	Farense	24	(0)
2002–2004	Varzim	6	(0)
2004–2007	9 Abril Trajouce		

International career
1991–1992	Portugal U-18	3	(0)
1993	Portugal U-20	3	(0)
1993	Portugal U-21	4	(0)
- * Club domestic league appearances and goals

Paulo Alexandre Marques Ferreira (born 14 September 1973) is a former Portuguese football player.

He played 10 seasons and 181 games in the Primeira Liga for Estrela da Amadora, Farense and Varzim.

== Club career ==
He made his Primeira Liga debut for Estrela da Amadora on 22 August 1993 in a game against Vitória Setúbal.
