= Bambo =

Portuguese footballer of Bissau-Guinean descent

Personal information
- Full name: Luis António Soares Cassamá
- Date of birth: 22 October 1974 (age 52)
- Place of birth: Bissau, Guinea-Bissau
- Height: 1.84 m (6 ft 0 in)
- Position: Forward

Youth career
- 1990–1992: Boavista

Senior career*
Years	Team	Apps	(Gls)
1992–1994	Boavista	11	(0)
1994–1995	União de Leiria	17	(1)
1995–1996	Estrela da Amadora	23	(3)
1996	Farense	6	(1)
1997	Felgueiras	18	(7)
1997–1998	Nacional	7	(0)
1998–1999	Esposende	20	(4)
1999–2000	Naval	16	(1)
2000	Ribeira Brava		
2000–2001	GF38		
- * Club domestic league appearances and goals

Luis António Soares Cassamá, known as Bambo (born 22 October 1974) is a Portuguese former professional footballer who played as a forward.

== Career ==
Bambo made his professional debut in the Primeira Liga for Boavista on 30 August 1992 as a late substitute in a 4–1 victory against Paços de Ferreira.

He represented Portugal at the 1992 UEFA European Under-18 Championship, 1993 UEFA European Under-18 Championship and the 1993 FIFA World Youth Championship.

== Personal life ==
Bambo of Bissau-Guinean descent.
