= Marvin Harriott =

English footballer (born 1974)

Personal information
- Full name: Marvin Lee Harriott
- Date of birth: 20 April 1974 (age 52)
- Place of birth: Dulwich, England
- Position: Right-back

Youth career
- West Ham Utd

Senior career*
Years	Team	Apps	(Gls)
1992–1993	Luton Town	0	(0)
1993	Barnsley	0	(0)
1993–1996	Bristol City	36	(0)
1996–1997	Fortuna Düsseldorf	4	(0)
1997–1998	Cardiff City	0	(0)
1998–1999	Aylesbury		
1999–2000	Scarborough	30	(1)
2000–?	Kingstonian		
- * Club domestic league appearances and goals

Marvin Lee Harriott (born 20 April 1974) is an English former professional footballer who played as a right-back.

== Career ==
Harriott spent the 1992–93 season with Luton Town, and after a brief spell with Barnsley, joined Bristol City, where he made 36 appearances in the Football League. Harriott later played for Grays Athletic, Cardiff City, Aylesbury, Gloucester City, Scarborough and Kingstonian.

Harriott also participated at the 1993 FIFA World Youth Championship, making five appearances in the tournament.
