= Ian Pearce (footballer) =

English footballer (born 1974)

Personal information
- Full name: Ian Anthony Pearce
- Date of birth: 7 May 1974 (age 52)
- Place of birth: Bury St Edmunds, England
- Height: 6 ft 3 in (1.91 m)
- Position: Defender

Team information
- Current team: West Bromwich Albion (Head of Recruitment)

Youth career
- Oxted & District

Senior career*
Years	Team	Apps	(Gls)
1991–1993	Chelsea	4	(0)
1993–1997	Blackburn Rovers	63	(2)
1997–2004	West Ham United	142	(9)
2004–2008	Fulham	57	(1)
2008	→ Southampton (loan)	1	(0)
2008–2009	Oxted & District		
2009	Kingstonian	1	(0)
2009–2010	Lincoln City	14	(0)
2011–2012	Kingstonian	3	(0)
Total		285	(12)

International career
- England U20
1995	England U21	3	(0)
- * Club domestic league appearances and goals

Ian Anthony Pearce (born 7 May 1974) is an English football coach and former professional footballer who is the head of recruitment at West Bromwich Albion.

As a player he was defender from 1990 until 2012, notably in the Premier League for Blackburn Rovers where he won the title in 1995. He also played top flight football for Chelsea, West Ham United and Fulham. He played in the Football League for Southampton and Lincoln City, as well as for non-league sides Oxted & District, Kingstonian and Lingfield. He was capped three times by the England U21 team in 1995.

Since retiring he has since worked on the coaching staff at Lincoln City and worked as a scout for Brighton & Hove Albion before taking up his current role with West Brom.

== Club career ==
=== Chelsea ===
Pearce started his career at Oxted & District FC before signing for Chelsea during the 1990–91 season. He made his debut on 11 May 1991 in a 2–2 draw with Aston Villa. He made five substitute appearances in three seasons for the west London club, before moving to Blackburn Rovers in October 1993 for a fee of £300,000.

=== Blackburn Rovers ===
Pearce's Blackburn debut was in a League Cup third-round replay against Shrewsbury Town on 9 Nov 1993, in which Pearce scored the winning goal in extra time. He scored his first League goal in April 1994 after coming on as a substitute in a 2–1 win at West Ham United, a result which guaranteed Rovers a place in Europe for the first time in their history. He moved to centre-half the following season, forming a formidable partnership with Colin Hendry, and won a Premier League medal in the 1994–95 season.

=== West Ham United ===
Pearce moved to West Ham United for £2.3 million on 9 October 1997. After playing regularly in his first two seasons with the club, and being named as runner-up in the 1999 Hammer of the Year award, he played just 37 minutes in 1999–2000 after injuring knee ligaments in a clash with teammate Stuart Pearce. Pearce was out for 14 months, returning on 28 October 2000 against Newcastle United. He failed to find his true fitness, and only made 17 appearances in the 2000–01 season. He was able to take part in pre-season training for the first time in five years in 2002–03, and despite some further niggling injuries, made 33 appearances in all competitions. He continued his form into the 2003–04, registering 26 starts in the First Division, before moving to Fulham in the January transfer window.

=== Fulham ===
Pearce signed for Fulham in January 2004 in a deal which involved an undisclosed transfer fee and Andy Melville moving to West Ham. He started nine games of that season as Fulham's first choice centre back. He made his debut in a match against Tottenham Hotspur at Loftus Road on 31 January 2004.

However, in his 2004–05 season, he was hampered with a back injury sustained in December 2004. He did manage to play a few reserve games at the end of the season, but did not play for the first team. In August 2005, he was close to signing for Norwich City, but pulled out because of family reasons.

Pearce was praised as 'Best player in pre season' by then Fulham manager Chris Coleman. His admirable resolve was demonstrated when in a 1–1 draw against Portsmouth he played through a painful foot injury only to score an equaliser before time and secure a critical point for Fulham.

On 22 February 2008, he joined Southampton on a 30-day loan deal. Injury restricted him to one appearance, in a 1–1 draw against Scunthorpe United.

Pearce had a trial for Brentford and played against Staines Town in a 3–0 win.

=== Later career ===
Pearce joined Surrey South Eastern Combination side Oxted & District, the club where his career began, in September 2008 and scored on his debut. Pearce signed for Kingstonian of the Isthmian League Premier Division on 21 August 2009 as an attacking midfielder and forward and made his competitive debut for the club against Aveley. He left the club on 27 September.

On 9 October 2009, in addition to his contract as assistant manager, Pearce signed a playing contract with Lincoln City. On 17 October, Pearce made his playing debut for Lincoln, coming on as a substitute in their 1–0 away defeat to Northampton Town. He was sent off as an unused substitute in a match against Cheltenham Town on 14 November 2009. He returned for Kingstonian on 19 March 2011, in the 2–0 win over Lowestoft Town. He also played for Lingfield in 2011, where he linked up with fellow ex-pro Nicky Forster.

== International career ==
Pearce was part of the England under-20 team that came third in the 1993 FIFA World Youth Championship, playing in all six matches and scoring one goal. He was capped three times for England at under-21 level in the mid-1990s, but never made the senior national side.

== Coaching career ==
On 30 September 2009, Pearce signed for Lincoln City as the club's assistant manager to newly appointed Chris Sutton, a former teammate at Blackburn Rovers. He left when Sutton resigned on 29 September 2010.

In 2014, he joined Brighton & Hove Albion as a scout. On 1 November 2018, he joined West Bromwich Albion as head of recruitment.

== Career statistics ==
Appearances and goals by club, season and competition
Club	Season	League			FA Cup		League Cup		Continental		Total	
Club	Season	Division	Apps	Goals	Apps	Goals	Apps	Goals	Apps	Goals	Apps	Goals
Chelsea	1990–91	First Division	1	0	0	0	0	0	–		1	0
Chelsea	1991–92	First Division	2	0	0	0	0	0	–		2	0
Chelsea	1992–93	Premier League	1	0	0	0	0	0	–		1	0
Blackburn Rovers	1993–94	Premier League	5	1	2	0	2	1	–		9	2
Blackburn Rovers	1994–95	Premier League	28	0	1	0	1	0	2 (Note: Appearances in UEFA Cup and Charity Shield)	0	32	0
Blackburn Rovers	1995–96	Premier League	12	1	0	0	3	0	5 (Note: Appearances in UEFA Champions League and Charity Shield)	0	20	1
Blackburn Rovers	1996–97	Premier League	12	0	0	0	0	0	–		12	0
Blackburn Rovers	1997–98	Premier League	5	0	0	0	0	0	–		5	0
West Ham United	1997–98	Premier League	30	1	4	1	1	0	–		35	2
West Ham United	1998–99	Premier League	33	2	0	0	0	0	–		33	2
West Ham United	1999–2000	Premier League	1	0	0	0	0	0	1 (Note: Appearances in the UEFA Intertoto Cup.)	0	2	0
West Ham United	2000–01	Premier League	15	1	1	0	1	0	–		17	1
West Ham United	2001–02	Premier League	9	2	0	0	0	0	–		9	2
West Ham United	2002–03	Premier League	30	2	2	0	1	0	–		33	2
West Ham United	2003–04	First Division	24	1	1	0	1	0	–		26	1
Fulham	2003–04	Premier League	13	0	0	0	0	0	–		13	0
Fulham	2004–05	Premier League	12	0	0	0	1	0	–		13	0
Fulham	2005–06	Premier League	10	0	1	0	1	0	–		12	0
Fulham	2006–07	Premier League	22	1	1	0	0	0	–		23	1
Fulham	2007–08	Premier League	1	0	0	0	1	0	–		2	0
Southampton	2007–08	Championship	1	0	0	0	0	0	–		1	0
Lincoln City	2009–10	League Two	10	0	1	0	0	0	–		11	0
Career total			277	12	14	1	13	1	8	0	312	14

== Honours ==
Blackburn Rovers

- Premier League: 1994–95

== Cricket ==
In 2009 Ian Pearce made his debut for Oxted and Limpsfield Cricket Club (Sunday XI) who compete in the Surrey League. As of 2020, Pearce has a top score of 89, with an average of 16.12, and in the field has affected 4 run outs and taken 18 catches.
