= Henry Zambrano =

Colombian footballer (born 1973)

Personal information
- Full name: Henry Zambrano Sandoval
- Date of birth: 7 August 1973 (age 53)
- Place of birth: Soledad, Atlántico, Colombia
- Height: 1.67 m (5 ft 6 in)
- Position: Forward

Senior career*
Years	Team	Apps	(Gls)
1993	Independiente Medellín	48	(16)
1994–1996	América de Cali		
1996	Independiente Medellín		
1997	América de Cali		
1997	LDU Quito		
1998–1999	Atlético Nacional	59	(22)
1999	MetroStars	14	(3)
2000	Colorado Rapids	17	(2)
2001	Junior Barranquilla	24	(4)
2002	Millonarios	7	(1)
2002	D.C. United	5	(1)
2003–2004	Deportes Tolima	42	(8)
2005	Deportes La Serena	16	(3)
2005	Deportes Quindío	5	(0)
2006–2007	Boyacá Chicó	59	(7)

International career
1994–1999	Colombia	11	(0)
- * Club domestic league appearances and goals

Henry Zambrano Sandoval (born August 7, 1973) is a retired soccer player who played as a forward for the Colombia national team. He first made his name at the 1993 World Youth Cup where he was the Golden Shoe winner—the award for the best player in the tournament. He later moved onward to senior national team, where he played between 1994 and 1999. For his club career, he played for Atlético Nacional, MetroStars, D.C. United, Colorado Rapids and Deportes Quindío.

== Career statistics ==
=== International ===
Appearances and goals by national team and year
National team	Year	Apps	Goals
Colombia	1994	2	0
Colombia	1995	–	
Colombia	1996	–	
Colombia	1997	–	
Colombia	1998	–	
Colombia	1999	9	0
Total		11	0
