= Aleksandr Karatayev =

Russian footballer

Personal information
- Full name: Aleksandr Yevgenyevich Karatayev
- Date of birth: 22 November 1973 (age 52)
- Place of birth: Taganrog, Russian SFSR
- Height: 1.80 m (5 ft 11 in)
- Positions: Forward; midfielder

Senior career*
Years	Team	Apps	(Gls)
1990	FC Rostselmash Rostov-on-Don	1	(0)
1990–1992	FC Spartak Moscow	2	(0)
1993	FC Lokomotiv-d Moscow	2	(0)
1993–1994	FC Bayern Munich	0	(0)
1995	FC KAMAZ-Chally Naberezhnye Chelny	16	(0)
1996–1997	1. FSV Mainz 05	6	(0)
1998	FC Neftekhimik Nizhnekamsk	13	(0)
1998	FC Gazovik-Gazprom Izhevsk	3	(0)
1999	FC Lada-Simbirsk Dimitrovgrad	31	(0)
2000–2001	FC Khimki	56	(10)
2002	FC SKA Rostov-on-Don	5	(0)
2002	FC Progress Kamensk	1	(0)
2002	FC Mir-Dongazdobycha Sulin	1	(0)
2002	FC Nika Krasny Sulin	10	(5)
2003	FC Trud Tikhoretsk		
2004	FC Amur Blagoveshchensk	23	(0)
2005	FC Shakhtyor Likhoy		
2006	FC Ordabasy		
2006–2007	FC Nika Krasny Sulin		
2008	FC MITOS Novocherkassk		

Managerial career
- 2009: FC MITOS Novocherkassk
- * Club domestic league appearances and goals

Aleksandr Yevgenyevich Karatayev (Russian: Александр Евгеньевич Каратаев; born 22 November 1973) is a Russian professional football coach and a former player. In 2009, he managed an Amateur Football League side FC MITOS Novocherkassk. He made his professional debut in the Soviet First League in 1990 for FC Rostselmash Rostov-on-Don.

He played one game for FC Bayern Munich Amateure in the DFB-Pokal and some league matches for this team.

== Honours ==
- Soviet Top League runner-up: 1991
- Russian Premier League champion: 1992
- Soviet Cup winner: 1992
