= Igor Zazulin =

Russian footballer and coach

Personal information
- Full name: Igor Petrovich Zazulin
- Date of birth: 13 April 1974 (age 52)
- Place of birth: Leningrad, Russian SFSR
- Height: 1.81 m (5 ft 11 1/2 in)
- Position: Midfielder

Youth career
- Svetlana St. Petersburg
- FC Zenit St. Petersburg

Senior career*
Years	Team	Apps	(Gls)
1991–1999	FC Zenit St. Petersburg	206	(42)
2000	FC Fakel Voronezh	14	(1)
2001–2002	FC Zenit-2 St. Petersburg	40	(7)
2003–2004	FC Petrotrest St. Petersburg	50	(11)
2005	FC Zenit-2 St. Petersburg	30	(6)

International career
1993	Russia U-20	4	(1)
1993	Russia U-21	1	(0)

Managerial career
- 2010: FC Dynamo St. Petersburg (assistant)
- 2010: FC Dynamo St. Petersburg
- 2011: FC Baltika Kaliningrad (assistant)
- 2012–2013: FC Avangard Kursk (assistant)
- 2013–2014: FC Avangard Kursk (caretaker)
- 2014–2015: FC Dynamo St. Petersburg (assistant)
- * Club domestic league appearances and goals

Igor Petrovich Zazulin (Russian: Игорь Петрович Зазулин; born 13 April 1974) is a Russian professional football coach and a former player.

== Club career ==
He made his professional debut in the Soviet First League in 1991 for FC Zenit Leningrad.

== Honours ==
- Russian Cup winner: 1999.
