= Odd Arild Skonhoft =

Norwegian football player (born 1973)

Personal information
- Date of birth: 26 September 1973 (age 53)
- Place of birth: Norway
- Position: Defender

Senior career*
Years	Team	Apps	(Gls)
-1993	IK Start	1	(0)
1996/1997	Raith Rovers F.C.	1	(0)
	FK Mandalskameratene	21+	(2+)

International career
1989	Norway U15	3	(0)
1990	Norway U16	3	(0)
1991	Norway U17	9	(0)
1992	Norway U18	4	(0)
1993	Norway U20	4	(0)
- * Club domestic league appearances and goals

Odd Arild Skonhoft (born 26 September 1973) is a Norwegian retired footballer.

== Career ==
He was capped 23 times for Norway as a youth international.

Skonhoft's only appearance for Scottish top flight side Raith Rovers came in the league against Dunfermline Athletic, where he picked up a yellow card, fell over the ball, and took a foul throw.
