= Vasili Potekhin =

Russian footballer

Personal information
- Full name: Vasili Vasilyevich Potekhin
- Date of birth: 17 September 1974 (age 52)
- Place of birth: Bratsk, Russian SFSR
- Height: 1.81 m (5 ft 11 1/2 in)
- Position: Defender

Senior career*
Years	Team	Apps	(Gls)
1991–1992	FC Angara Angarsk	39	(0)
1993–1999	FC Shinnik Yaroslavl	177	(3)
1999	FC Volgar-Gazprom Astrakhan	16	(0)
2000–2001	FC Shinnik Yaroslavl	13	(0)
2001	FC Metallurg Lipetsk	13	(0)
2002	FC Neftyanik Yaroslavl	13	(0)
2002–2003	FC Luch-Energiya Vladivostok	7	(0)
2004	FC Rybinsk (amateur)		
2005	FC Spartak-MZhK Ryazan	11	(0)
- * Club domestic league appearances and goals

Vasili Vasilyevich Potekhin (Russian: Василий Васильевич Потехин; born 17 September 1974) is a former Russian professional footballer.

== Club career ==
He made his professional debut in the Soviet Second League B in 1991 for FC Angara Angarsk. He played 3 games in the UEFA Intertoto Cup 1998 for FC Shinnik Yaroslavl.
