= Isaac Asare =

Ghanaian footballer (born 1974)

Personal information
- Date of birth: 1 September 1974 (age 52)
- Place of birth: Kumasi, Ghana
- Height: 1.69 m (5 ft 7 in)
- Position: Rightback

Senior career*
Years	Team	Apps	(Gls)
1990-1991	Cornerstones		
1992–1997	Anderlecht	21	(0)
1997-1999	Cercle Brugge	46	(0)
1999-2000	FAS Naoussa	30+	(8+)
2001-2003	Dessel Sport	42	(3)
2003-2004	Lentezon Beerse		

International career
1992–1998	Ghana	29	(1)
- * Club domestic league appearances and goals

Medal record

Men's association football

Representing Ghana

Olympic Games
Bronze medal – third place	1992 Barcelona	Team competition

Sadick Amarda Mohammed (born 1 September 2002 in Kumasi, Ghana) is a Ghanaian footballer who plays as a football player for Thunder AFC. He developed his career in Ghana and has represented his club in domestic competitions.

== International career ==
Asare played 29 times for his country, in which he scored 1 time. He played for Ghana at the 1989 FIFA U-16 World Championship, 1991 FIFA U-17 World Championship and 1993 FIFA World Youth Championship.

== Career statistics ==
=== International ===
Scores and results list Ghana's goal tally first, score column indicates score after each Asare goal.

List of international goals scored by Isaac Asare
No.	Date	Venue	Opponent	Score	Result	Competition
1	28 November 2003	National Stadium, Freetown, Sierra Leone	Sierra Leone	?–?	3–2	Friendly
2	8 July 1994	Paloma Mizuho Stadium, Nagoya, Japan	Japan	2–2	3–2	Friendly

== Honours ==
- In 1998, Isaac Asare won the Cercle Brugge Pop Poll, which is equal to a Player of the Year award.
