= Anthony Carbone =

Australian soccer player

Tony Carbone
Personal information
- Full name: Anthony Carbone
- Date of birth: 13 October 1974 (age 52)
- Place of birth: Australia
- Position: Midfielder

Senior career*
Years	Team	Apps	(Gls)
- Perth SC
–1996	Nottingham Forest	0	(0)
1996/97–1998	Perth Glory FC	27	(2)
1998	Sorrento FC		
1998–1999	Perth Glory FC	6	(0)
2001	Hougang United FC		
- * Club domestic league appearances and goals

Anthony Carbone (born 13 October 1974) is an Australian former soccer player.

== Career ==
Carbone scored the first ever golden goal in football history against Uruguay at the 1993 FIFA World Youth Championship, helping him earn a move to Nottingham Forest in the English Premier League.

In 2001, he played professionally for Hougang United in the Singaporean S.League.
