= Sergei Chudin =

Russian professional footballer and coach

Personal information
- Full name: Sergei Sergeyevich Chudin
- Date of birth: 24 November 1973 (age 52)
- Place of birth: Moscow, Russian SFSR
- Height: 1.90 m (6 ft 3 in)
- Positions: Defender; midfielder

Senior career*
Years	Team	Apps	(Gls)
1990–1996	FC Spartak Moscow (reserves)	168	(57)
1991–1996	FC Spartak Moscow	21	(1)
1997–1998	FC Lokomotiv Nizhny Novgorod	36	(3)
1999–2003	FC Baltika Kaliningrad	128	(1)
2004	FC Almaz Moscow	15	(6)
2006	FC Fortuna Mytishchi	33	(10)
2007	FC Znamya Truda Orekhovo-Zuyevo	18	(4)
2008–2009	FC Fortuna Mytishchi		

Managerial career
- 2017–2018: FC Veles Moscow (assistant)
- * Club domestic league appearances and goals

Sergei Sergeyevich Chudin (Russian: Серге́й Серге́евич Чудин; born 24 November 1973) is a Russian professional football coach and a former player.

== Club career ==
He made his debut in the Soviet Top League in 1991 for FC Spartak Moscow.

== Honours ==
- Soviet Top League runner-up: 1991.
- Soviet Cup winner: 1992.
- Russian Premier League champion: 1992, 1993, 1994, 1996.
- Russian Premier League bronze: 1995.
- Russian Cup winner: 1994.
- Russian Cup finalist: 1996.

== European club competitions ==
- UEFA Champions League 1994–95 with FC Spartak Moscow: 1 game.
- UEFA Champions League 1995–96 with FC Spartak Moscow: 1 game.
- UEFA Intertoto Cup 1997 with FC Lokomotiv Nizhny Novgorod: 4 games.
