= 1993 FIFA World Youth Championship =

FIFA Youth World Cup Australia 1993

Tournament details
- Host country: Australia
- Dates: 5–20 March
- Teams: 16 (from 6 confederations)
- Venues: 5 (in 5 host cities)

Final positions
- Champions: Brazil (3rd title)
- Runners-up: Ghana
- Third place: England
- Fourth place: Australia

Tournament statistics
- Matches played: 32
- Goals scored: 82 (2.56 per match)
- Attendance: 478,003 (14,938 per match)
- Top scorer(s): (Brazil) Gian (Brazil) Adriano (Australia) Ante Milicic (Mexico) Nieto (United States) Chris Faklaris (Colombia) Henry Zambrano (Ghana) Augustine Ahinful (3 goals)
- Best player: (Brazil) Adriano
- Fair play award: England

The 1993 FIFA World Youth Championship, known as the 1993 FIFA/Coca-Cola World Youth Championship for sponsorship purposes, was the 9th edition FIFA World Youth Championship. U20 Brazil defeated Ghana, 2–1 for its third title. It took place across five cities in Australia. The tournament was originally to be held in Yugoslavia, but due to the Yugoslav Wars, was moved to Australia.

== Venues ==
Sydney	Melbourne	Adelaide
Sydney Football Stadium	Olympic Park Stadium	Football Park
Capacity: 45,500	Capacity: 18,500	Capacity: 51,240
1993 FIFA World Youth Championship is located in Australia
Brisbane		Canberra
Lang Park		Bruce Stadium
Capacity: 52,500		Capacity: 25,011

== Qualification ==
For the first time ever, Russia competed after the dissolution of Soviet Union. It was also the first time Germany played after the reunification. However, as they are designated as descendant of East Germany and West Germany respectively, they are not considered as tournament debutants.

Confederation	Qualifying Tournament	Qualifier(s)
AFC (Asia)	1992 AFC Youth Championship	Saudi Arabia; South Korea
CAF (Africa)	1993 African Youth Championship	Cameroon; Ghana^{1}
CONCACAF (North, Central America & Caribbean)	1992 CONCACAF U-20 Tournament	Mexico; United States
CONMEBOL (South America)	1992 South American Youth Championship	Brazil; Colombia; Uruguay
OFC (Oceania)	Host nation	Australia
UEFA (Europe)	1992 UEFA European Under-18 Football Championship	England; Germany^{2} Norway; Portugal; Russia^{3} Turkey^{1}

1.Teams that made their debut.
2.Germany made their debut as a unified nation. They were chosen as the descendant of the now-defunct West Germany, which qualified in 1981 and 1987 tournaments. The now-defunct East Germany qualified in 1987 and 1989 tournaments.
3.Russia made their debut as independent nation. They were chosen as the descendant of the now-defunct Soviet Union, which qualified in 1977, 1979, 1983, 1985, 1989, and 1991 tournaments.

== Group stage ==
The 16 teams were split into four groups of four teams. Four group winners, and four second-place finishers qualify for the knockout round.

=== Group A ===
Pos	Team	Pld	W	D	L	GF	GA	GD	Pts	Group stage result
1	Russia	3	2	0	1	6	4	+2	4	Advance to knockout stage
2	Australia (H)	3	2	0	1	5	4	+1	4	Advance to knockout stage
3	Cameroon	3	1	0	2	4	5	−1	2	
4	Colombia	3	1	0	2	5	7	−2	2	

(H) Hosts
5 March 1993
20:30

Australia	2–1	Colombia
Milicic 39'; Muscat 78'	Report	Zambrano 35'

Sydney Football Stadium, Sydney
Attendance: 31,883
Referee: Kim Milton Nielsen (Denmark)

6 March 1993
20:30

Russia	2–0	Cameroon
Zazulin 1'; Karataev 37'	Report

Bruce Stadium, Canberra
Attendance: 5,362
Referee: Renato Marsiglia (Brazil)

8 March 1993
18:15

Colombia	3–2	Cameroon
Zambrano 43', 83'; Restrepo 45'	Report	Foé 12'; Ndiefi 44'

Bruce Stadium, Canberra
Attendance: 3,749
Referee: Essa Rashed Al Jassas (Kuwait)

8 March 1993
20:30

Australia	3–1	Russia
Magomedov 12' (o.g.); Milicic 69'; Agostino 81'	Report	Chudin 18'

Sydney Football Stadium, Sydney
Attendance: 18,982
Referee: Rodrigo Badilla (Costa Rica)

11 March 1993
18:15

Colombia	1–3	Russia
Betancourth 63' (pen.)	Report	Karataev 6' (pen.); Ananko 19'; Savchenko 86'

Sydney Football Stadium, Sydney
Attendance: 27,581
Referee: Kim Milton Nielsen (Denmark)

11 March 1993
20:30

Australia	0–2	Cameroon
	Report	Tchoutang 44'; Embe 90'

Sydney Football Stadium, Sydney
Attendance: 27,581
Referee: Renato Marsiglia (Brazil)

=== Group B ===
Pos	Team	Pld	W	D	L	GF	GA	GD	Pts	Group stage result
1	Uruguay	3	2	1	0	5	3	+2	5	Advance to knockout stage
2	Ghana	3	1	2	0	5	3	+2	4	Advance to knockout stage
3	Germany	3	1	1	1	4	4	0	3	
4	Portugal	3	0	0	3	1	5	−4	0	

6 March 1993
18:15

Portugal	0–1	Germany
	(Report)	Jancker 86'

Lang Park, Brisbane
Attendance: 15,000
Referee: Rémi Harrel (France)

6 March 1993
20:30

Uruguay	1–1	Ghana
Correa 22'	(Report)	Ahinful 72'

Lang Park, Brisbane
Attendance: 15,000
Referee: Ahmet Çakar (Turkey)

9 March 1993
18:15

Germany	2–2	Ghana
Breitenreiter 39'; Jancker 80'	(Report)	Kuffour 36'; Duah 70'

Lang Park, Brisbane
Attendance: 6,000
Referee: Letchmanasamy Kathirveloo (Malaysia)

9 March 1993
20:30

Portugal	1–2	Uruguay
Bambo 32'	(Report)	O'Neill 8', 87'

Lang Park, Brisbane
Attendance: 6,000
Referee: Fredy Burgos Escobar (Guatemala)

11 March 1993
18:15

Germany	1–2	Uruguay
Breitenreiter 74'	(Report)	López 2'; Correa 65'

Lang Park, Brisbane
Attendance: 7,000
Referee: Ahmet Çakar (Turkey)

11 March 1993
20:30

Portugal	0–2	Ghana
	(Report)	Lamptey 5'; Akonnor 42'

Lang Park, Brisbane
Attendance: 7,000
Referee: Letchmanasamy Kathirveloo (Malaysia)

=== Group C ===
Pos	Team	Pld	W	D	L	GF	GA	GD	Pts	Group stage result
1	England	3	2	1	0	3	1	+2	5	Advance to knockout stage
2	United States	3	1	1	1	8	3	+5	3	Advance to knockout stage
3	South Korea	3	0	3	0	4	4	0	3	
4	Turkey	3	0	1	2	1	8	−7	1	

7 March 1993
18:15

South Korea	1–1	England
Watson 32' (o.g.)	(Report)	Pearce 82'

Olympic Park Stadium, Melbourne
Attendance: 15,732
Referee: Hellmut Krug (Germany)

7 March 1993
20:30

Turkey	0–6	United States
	(Report)	Baba 22'; Joseph 26', 72'; Faklaris 28', 46', 90'

Olympic Park Stadium, Melbourne
Attendance: 15,732
Referee: Jorge Nieves (Uruguay)

9 March 1993
18:15

England	1–0	United States
Bart-Williams 69'	(Report)

Olympic Park Stadium, Melbourne
Attendance: 9,274
Referee: Jorge Nieves (Uruguay)

9 March 1993
20:30

South Korea	1–1	Turkey
Cho Jin-ho 32'	(Report)	Reçber 85'

Olympic Park Stadium, Melbourne
Attendance: 9,274
Referee: Dodji Mawuk Hounnake Kouassi (Togo)

11 March 1993
18:15

England	1–0	Turkey
Joachim 12'	(Report)

Olympic Park Stadium, Melbourne
Attendance: 12,972
Referee: Jorge Nieves (Uruguay)

11 March 1993
20:30

South Korea	2–2	United States
Lee Ki-hyung 39', 52'	(Report)	Kelly 37'; Zavagnin 78'

Olympic Park Stadium, Melbourne
Attendance: 12,972
Referee: Hellmut Krug (Germany)

=== Group D ===
Pos	Team	Pld	W	D	L	GF	GA	GD	Pts	Group stage result
1	Brazil	3	2	1	0	4	1	+3	5	Advance to knockout stage
2	Mexico	3	2	0	1	6	3	+3	4	Advance to knockout stage
3	Saudi Arabia	3	0	2	1	1	2	−1	2	
4	Norway	3	0	1	2	0	5	−5	1	

7 March 1993
18:15

Mexico	3–0	Norway
Nieto 45', 71'; Olalde 84'	(Report)

Football Park, Adelaide
Attendance: 10,000
Referee: Richard Lorenc (Australia)

7 March 1993
20:30

Brazil	0–0	Saudi Arabia
	(Report)

Football Park, Adelaide
Attendance: 10,000
Referee: Sergei Khusainov (Russia)

9 March 1993
18:15

Norway	0–0	Saudi Arabia
	(Report)

Football Park, Adelaide
Attendance: 10,000
Referee: Omer Yengo (Congo)

9 March 1993
20:30

Mexico	1–2	Brazil
Nieto 80'	(Report)	Adriano 22' (pen.); Gian 56' (pen.)

Football Park, Adelaide
Attendance: 10,000
Referee: Armando Pérez Hoyos (Colombia)

11 March 1993
18:15

Norway	0–2	Brazil
	(Report)	Gian 59'; Adriano 62'

Football Park, Adelaide
Attendance: 7,000
Referee: Sergei Khusainov (Russia)

11 March 1993
20:30

Mexico	2–1	Saudi Arabia
Salazar 60', 72'	(Report)	Al Takrouni 5'

Football Park, Adelaide
Attendance: 7,000
Referee: Richard Lorenc (Australia)

== Knockout stage ==
Quarter-finals
13 March - Sydney
Russia	0
Ghana	3
14 March - Melbourne
England (p)	0 (4)
Mexico	0 (3)
13 March - Brisbane
Uruguay	1
Australia (a.e.t.)	2
14 March - Adelaide
Brazil	3
United States	0

Semi-finals
17 March - Sydney
Ghana	2
England	1
17 March - Melbourne
Australia	0
Brazil	2

Final
20 March - Sydney
Ghana	1
Brazil	2
Third place
20 March - Sydney
England	2
Australia	1

=== Quarter-finals ===
13 March 1993
18:15

Uruguay	1–2 (a.e.t.)	Australia
Sena Lamela 21'	(Report)	Agostino 59'; Carbone 99'

Lang Park, Brisbane
Attendance: 14,000
Referee: Rémi Harrel (France)

13 March 1993
20:30

Russia	0–3	Ghana
	(Report)	Ahinful 72'; Addo 75'; Asare 83'

Sydney Football Stadium, Sydney
Attendance: 16,710
Referee: Rodrigo Badilla (Costa Rica)

14 March 1993
18:15

England	0–0 (a.e.t.)	Mexico
	(Report)
Penalties
Pollock (penalty scored); Caskey (penalty scored); Thompson (penalty scored); Bart-Williams (penalty scored)	4–3	(penalty missed) Olalde; (penalty scored) Amante; (penalty scored) Astivia; (penalty scored) C. González; (penalty missed) Solis

Olympic Park Stadium, Melbourne
Attendance: 11,000
Referee: Hellmut Krug (Germany)

14 March 1993
20:30

Brazil	3–0	United States
Bruno 32', 90'; Adriano 51'	(Report)

Football Park, Adelaide
Attendance: 12,000
Referee: Kim Milton Nielsen (Denmark)

=== Semi-finals ===
17 March 1993
18:30

Australia	0–2	Brazil
	(Report)	Marcelinho 77'; Catê 89'

Olympic Park Stadium, Melbourne
Attendance: 22,100
Referee: Hellmut Krug (Germany)

17 March 1993
20:30

Ghana	2–1	England
Ahinful 14' (pen.); Gargo 24'	(Report)	Pollock 49' (pen.)

Sydney Football Stadium, Sydney
Attendance: 21,069
Referee: Armando Pérez Hoyos (Colombia)

=== Third place play-off ===
20 March 1993
16:30

England	2–1	Australia
Unsworth 39'; Joachim 85'	(Report)	Milicic 52'

Sydney Football Stadium, Sydney
Attendance: 40,015
Referee: Letchmanasamy Kathirveloo (Malaysia)

=== Final ===
20 March 1993
19:00

Ghana	1–2	Brazil
Duah 15'	(Report)	Yan 50'; Gian 88'

Sydney Football Stadium, Sydney
Attendance: 40,015
Referee: Ahmet Çakar (Turkey)

== Result ==
FIFA World Youth Championship 1993 winners

Brazil
Third title

== Awards ==
Golden Shoe	Golden Ball	Fair Play Award
(Colombia) Henry Zambrano	(Brazil) Adriano	England

== Goalscorers ==
Henry Zambrano of Colombia won the Golden Boot award for scoring three goals. In total, 82 goals were scored by 56 different players, with two of them credited as own goals.

3 goals

- (Australia) Ante Milicic
- (Brazil) Gian
- (Brazil) Adriano
- (Colombia) Henry Zambrano
- (Ghana) Augustine Ahinful
- (Mexico) Vicente Nieto
- (United States) Chris Faklaris

2 goals

- (Australia) Paul Agostino
- (England) Julian Joachim
- (Germany) André Breitenreiter
- (Germany) Carsten Jancker
- (Ghana) Emmanuel Duah
- (Mexico) Luis Salazar
- (Russia) Aleksandr Karatayev
- (South Korea) Lee Ki-hyung
- (United States) Miles Joseph
- (Uruguay) Fabián O'Neill
- (Uruguay) Fernando Correa

1 goal

- (Australia) Anthony Carbone
- (Australia) Kevin Muscat
- (Brazil) Bruno Carvalho
- (Brazil) Catê
- (Brazil) Marcelinho Paulista
- (Brazil) Yan Razera
- (Cameroon) Bernard Tchoutang
- (Cameroon) David Embé
- (Cameroon) Marc-Vivien Foé
- (Cameroon) Pius Ndiefi
- (Colombia) Arley Betancourth
- (Colombia) Oscar Restrepo
- (England) Chris Bart-Williams
- (England) David Unsworth
- (England) Ian Pearce
- (England) Jamie Pollock
- (Ghana) Charles Akonnor
- (Ghana) Daniel Addo
- (Ghana) Isaac Asare
- (Ghana) Mohammed Gargo
- (Ghana) Nii Lamptey
- (Ghana) Samuel Kuffour
- (Mexico) Jesús Olalde
- (Portugal) Bambo
- (Russia) Aleksei Savchenko
- (Russia) Dmitri Ananko
- (Russia) Igor Zazulin
- (Russia) Sergei Chudin
- (Saudi Arabia) Abdullah Al Takrouni
- (South Korea) Cho Jin-ho
- (Turkey) Serkan Reçber
- (United States) Brian Kelly
- (United States) Imad Baba
- (United States) Kerry Zavagnin
- (Uruguay) Diego López
- (Uruguay) Sergio Sena Lamela

Own goal

- (England) Steve Watson (playing against South Korea)
- (Russia) Murad Magomedov (playing against Australia)

== Final ranking ==
Pos	Team	Pld	W	D	L	GF	GA	GD	Pts	Final result
1	Brazil	6	5	1	0	11	2	+9	11	Champions
2	Ghana	6	3	2	1	11	6	+5	8	Runners-up
3	England	6	3	2	1	6	4	+2	8	Third place
4	Australia (H)	6	3	0	3	8	9	−1	6	Fourth place
5	Mexico	4	2	1	1	6	3	+3	5	Eliminated in Quarter-finals
6	Uruguay	4	2	1	1	6	5	+1	5	Eliminated in Quarter-finals
7	Russia	4	2	0	2	6	7	−1	4	Eliminated in Quarter-finals
8	United States	4	1	1	2	8	6	+2	3	Eliminated in Quarter-finals
9	Germany	3	1	1	1	4	4	0	3	Eliminated in Group stage
10	South Korea	3	0	3	0	4	4	0	3	Eliminated in Group stage
11	Cameroon	3	1	0	2	4	5	−1	2	Eliminated in Group stage
12	Colombia	3	1	0	2	5	7	−2	2	Eliminated in Group stage
13	Saudi Arabia	3	0	2	1	1	2	−1	2	Eliminated in Group stage
14	Norway	3	0	1	2	0	5	−5	1	Eliminated in Group stage
15	Turkey	3	0	1	2	1	8	−7	1	Eliminated in Group stage
16	Portugal	3	0	0	3	1	5	−4	0	Eliminated in Group stage

Source: rsssf.com
(H) Hosts
