= Murad Magomedov =

Russian footballer

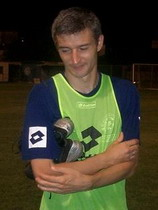
- Murad Magomedov

Personal information
- Full name: Murad Magomedov
- Date of birth: 25 September 1973 (age 53)
- Place of birth: Makhachkala, USSR
- Height: 1.80 m (5 ft 11 in)
- Position: Defender

Senior career*
Years	Team	Apps	(Gls)
1990–1991	Dynamo Makhachkala	62	(0)
1992–1993	Zhemchuzhina-Sochi	56	(0)
1993	Torpedo Adler	1	(1)
1994	Zhemchuzhina-Sochi	15	(0)
1995–2011	Maccabi Petah Tikva	442	(6)
2012–2013	Maccabi Petah Tikva	23	(0)
2013–2015	Maccabi Amishav Petah Tikva	50	(2)
2016	Ironi Beit Dagan	9	(1)

International career
1992–1993	Russia U21	4	(0)

Managerial career
- 2011–: Maccabi Petah Tikva (assistant)
- * Club domestic league appearances and goals

Murad Magomedov (born 25 September 1973) is a Russian former footballer.

== Early life ==
Murad was born in Makhachkala, Soviet Russia, to a Kumyk family.

== Honours ==
- Toto Cup:
  - Winner (2): 1999–00, 2003–04
- Israel State Cup:
  - Runner-up (1): 2001
- Israeli Premier League:
  - Runner-up (1): 2004–05
