= Marcelinho Paulista =

Brazilian footballer

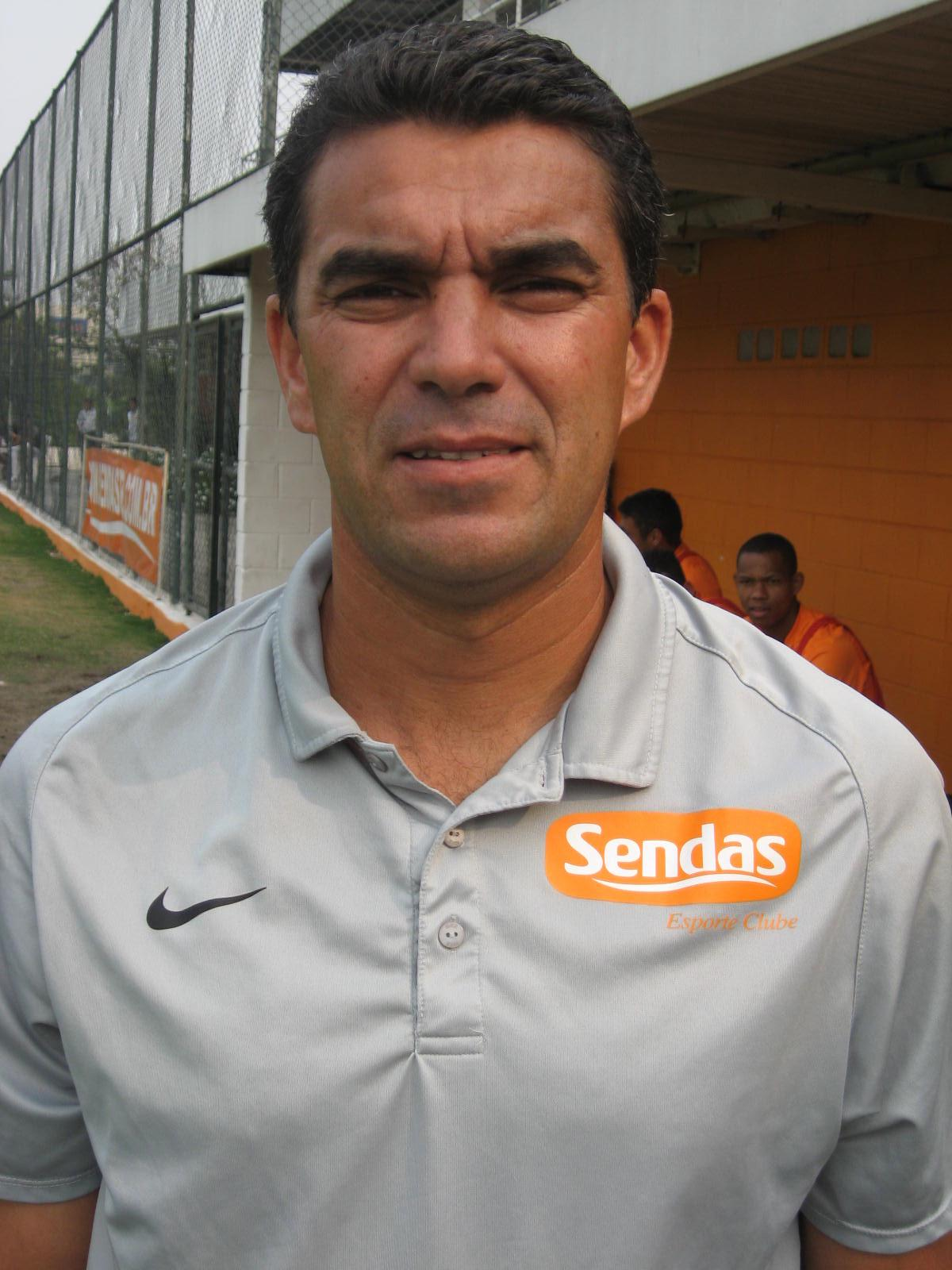

Personal information
- Full name: Marcelo José de Souza
- Date of birth: 13 September 1973 (age 53)
- Place of birth: Cotia, Brazil
- Height: 1.75 m (5 ft 9 in)
- Position: Midfielder

Team information
- Current team: Água Santa (youth coordinator)

Youth career
- 1991–1992: Corinthians

Senior career*
Years	Team	Apps	(Gls)
1992–1996	Corinthians	124	(10)
1997	Botafogo	23	(0)
1998	Corinthians	0	(0)
1998	Guarani	18	(0)
1999	Fluminense	0	(0)
1999–2001	Botafogo	33	(0)
2001–2002	Panionios	6	(1)
2002–2003	Juventude	5	(0)
2003–2004	Almería	3	(1)
2004	Cabofriense		
2005	Estácio de Sá		

International career
1993	Brazil U20	6	(1)
1994	Brazil	1	(0)
1996	Brazil U23	1	(0)

Managerial career
- 2010: Sendas
- 2025: Água Santa U20
- 2025: Água Santa (interim)
Medal record
Representing Brazil
Men's Football
Bronze medal – third place	1996 Atlanta	Team competition
- * Club domestic league appearances and goals

Marcelo José de Souza (born 13 September 1973), commonly known as Marcelinho Paulista, is a Brazilian football coach and former player who played as a midfielder. He is the youth coordinator of Água Santa.

He made his debut for the Brazil national team in 1994, and played four additional matches in the run-up to the 1996 Olympic Games. At the Olympics he only played against Portugal in what would be his final international match.
