= 2016 UEFA European Under-19 Championship qualification =

Tournament details
- Dates: Qualifying round: 18 September – 18 November 2015; Elite round: 23–30 March 2016
- Teams: 53 (from 1 confederation)

Tournament statistics
- Matches played: 120
- Goals scored: 352 (2.93 per match)
- Top scorer: Ivan Šaponjić (6 goals)

The 2016 UEFA European Under-19 Championship qualification was a men's under-19 football competition organised by UEFA to determine the seven national teams joining the automatically qualified hosts Germany in the 2016 UEFA European Under-19 Championship final tournament.

A total of 53 national teams entered this qualifying competition, which was played in two rounds between September 2015 and March 2016. Players born on or after 1 January 1997 were eligible to participate.

== Format ==
The qualifying competition consisted of two rounds:

- Qualifying round: Apart from Spain, which received a bye to the elite round as the team with the highest seeding coefficient, the remaining 52 teams were drawn into 13 groups of four teams. Each group was played in single round-robin format at one of the teams selected as hosts after the draw. The 13 group winners, the 13 runners-up, and the third-placed team with the best record against the first- and second-placed teams in its group advanced to the elite round.
- Elite round: The 28 teams were drawn into seven groups of four teams. Each group was played in single round-robin format at one of the teams selected as hosts after the draw. The seven group winners qualified for the final tournament.

=== Tiebreakers ===
The teams were ranked according to points (3 points for a win, 1 point for a draw, 0 points for a loss). If two or more teams were equal on points on completion of a mini-tournament, the following tie-breaking criteria were applied, in the order given, to determine the rankings:

1. Higher number of points obtained in the mini-tournament matches played among the teams in question;
2. Superior goal difference resulting from the mini-tournament matches played among the teams in question;
3. Higher number of goals scored in the mini-tournament matches played among the teams in question;
4. If, after having applied criteria 1 to 3, teams still had an equal ranking, criteria 1 to 3 were reapplied exclusively to the mini-tournament matches between the teams in question to determine their final rankings. If this procedure did not lead to a decision, criteria 5 to 9 applied;
5. Superior goal difference in all mini-tournament matches;
6. Higher number of goals scored in all mini-tournament matches;
7. If only two teams had the same number of points, and they were tied according to criteria 1 to 6 after having met in the last round of the mini-tournament, their rankings were determined by a penalty shoot-out (not used if more than two teams had the same number of points, or if their rankings were not relevant for qualification for the next stage).
8. Lower disciplinary points total based only on yellow and red cards received in the mini-tournament matches (red card = 3 points, yellow card = 1 point, expulsion for two yellow cards in one match = 3 points);
9. Drawing of lots.

To determine the best third-placed team from the qualifying round, the results against the teams in fourth place were discarded. The following criteria were applied:

1. Higher number of points;
2. Superior goal difference;
3. Higher number of goals scored;
4. Lower disciplinary points total based only on yellow and red cards received (red card = 3 points, yellow card = 1 point, expulsion for two yellow cards in one match = 3 points);
5. Drawing of lots.

== Qualifying round ==
=== Draw ===
The draw for the qualifying round was held on 3 December 2014, 09:50 CET (UTC+1), at the UEFA headquarters in Nyon, Switzerland.

The teams were seeded according to their coefficient ranking, calculated based on the following:

- 2012 UEFA European Under-19 Championship final tournament and qualifying competition (qualifying round and elite round)
- 2013 UEFA European Under-19 Championship final tournament and qualifying competition (qualifying round and elite round)
- 2014 UEFA European Under-19 Championship final tournament and qualifying competition (qualifying round and elite round)

Each group contained two teams from Pot A and two teams from Pot B. For political reasons, Armenia and Azerbaijan (due to the disputed status of Nagorno-Karabakh), as well as Russia and Ukraine (due to the Russian military intervention in Ukraine), could not be drawn in the same group.

Bye to elite round
Team	Coeff	Rank
Spain	13.667	1

Pot A
Team	Coeff	Rank
Portugal	11.833	2
Serbia	11.000	3
France	10.333	4
England	9.833	5
Turkey	9.500	6
Georgia	8.500	7
Austria	8.333	8
Ukraine	8.167	9
Denmark	7.667	10
Netherlands	7.500	11
Croatia	7.167	12
Greece	6.833	13
Czech Republic	6.167	14
Belgium	6.000	15
Republic of Ireland	6.000	16
Switzerland	6.000	17
Norway	5.833	18
Israel	5.833	19
Italy	5.667	20
Romania	5.500	21
Bulgaria	5.167	22
Hungary	5.000	23
Sweden	4.833	24
Russia	4.667	25
Scotland	4.667	26
Cyprus	4.167	27

Pot B
Team	Coeff	Rank
Montenegro	4.167	28
Bosnia and Herzegovina	4.167	29
Slovenia	4.167	30
Slovakia	4.167	31
Macedonia	4.000	32
Poland	3.667	33
Iceland	3.167	34
Armenia	3.000	35
Estonia	3.000	36
Albania	3.000	37
Wales	2.833	38
Northern Ireland	2.667	39
Latvia	2.333	40
Finland	2.333	41
Belarus	2.000	42
Lithuania	1.833	43
Azerbaijan	1.667	44
Malta	1.333	45
Luxembourg	1.000	46
Faroe Islands	1.000	47
Kazakhstan	0.333	48
Moldova	0.333	49
San Marino	0.000	50
Andorra	0.000	51
Liechtenstein	0.000	52
Gibraltar	0.000	53

Notes

- Germany (Coeff: 8.833) qualified automatically for the final tournament as hosts.

=== Groups ===
Times up to 24 October 2015 were CEST (UTC+2), thereafter times were CET (UTC+1).

==== Group 1 ====
Pos	Team	Pld	W	D	L	GF	GA	GD	Pts	Qualification
1	Slovenia	3	2	1	0	2	0	+2	7	Elite round
2	Scotland	3	2	0	1	6	1	+5	6	Elite round
3	Republic of Ireland (H)	3	1	0	2	3	5	−2	3	
4	Latvia	3	0	1	2	0	5	−5	1	

Source: UEFA
Rules for classification: Qualification tiebreakers
(H) Hosts
13 November 2015
15:30

Scotland	2–0	Latvia
Nesbitt 22'; Sammut 44'	Report

Markets Field, Limerick
Attendance: 20
Referee: Gunnar Jarl Jónsson (Iceland)
13 November 2015
17:00

Republic of Ireland	0–1	Slovenia
	Report	Rokavec 32'

Eamonn Deacy Park, Galway
Attendance: 171
Referee: Antti Munukka (Finland)

15 November 2015
15:30

Slovenia	1–0	Scotland
Ivkič 73'	Report

Markets Field, Limerick
Attendance: 50
Referee: Gunnar Jarl Jónsson (Iceland)
15 November 2015
20:30

Republic of Ireland	3–0	Latvia
Mulhern 9', 64'; Kelly 56'	Report

Eamonn Deacy Park, Galway
Attendance: 107
Referee: Alan Mario Sant (Malta)

18 November 2015
16:30

Scotland	4–0	Republic of Ireland
Hardie 2'; Nesbitt 24'; Ros. McCrorie 30'; Kiltie 67'	Report

Markets Field, Limerick
Attendance: 200
Referee: Antti Munukka (Finland)
18 November 2015
16:30

Latvia	0–0	Slovenia
	Report

Eamonn Deacy Park, Galway
Attendance: 29
Referee: Alan Mario Sant (Malta)

==== Group 2 ====
Pos	Team	Pld	W	D	L	GF	GA	GD	Pts	Qualification
1	Croatia (H)	3	2	1	0	5	2	+3	7	Elite round
2	Montenegro	3	2	0	1	6	4	+2	6	Elite round
3	Hungary	3	1	1	1	5	4	+1	4	
4	Kazakhstan	3	0	0	3	1	7	−6	0	

Source: UEFA
Rules for classification: Qualification tiebreakers
(H) Hosts
18 September 2015
14:00

Hungary	4–0	Kazakhstan
Haris 7' (pen.); Petró 32'; Szatmári 83' (pen.); Rózsahegyi 87'	Report

Stadion Veli Jože, Poreč
Referee: Alexandre Boucaut (Belgium)
18 September 2015
16:00

Croatia	3–1	Montenegro
Matić 36', 45+1'; Božić 78'	Report	Perović 40'

Stadion Veruda, Pula
Referee: Jakob Kehlet (Denmark)

20 September 2015
14:00

Montenegro	3–0	Hungary
Camaj 45+1'; Banović 83'; Perović 88'	Report

Stadion Veruda, Pula
Referee: Alexandre Boucaut (Belgium)
20 September 2015
16:00

Croatia	1–0	Kazakhstan
Brekalo 31'	Report

Stadion Veli Jože, Poreč
Referee: Enea Jorgji (Albania)

23 September 2015
16:00

Hungary	1–1	Croatia
Korozmán 15'	Report	Knežević 49' (pen.)

Stadion Veruda, Pula
Referee: Jakob Kehlet (Denmark)
23 September 2015
16:00

Kazakhstan	1–2	Montenegro
Zyabko 15'	Report	Rašo 55'; Vukicević 73'

Stadion Veli Jože, Poreč
Referee: Enea Jorgji (Albania)

==== Group 3 ====
Pos	Team	Pld	W	D	L	GF	GA	GD	Pts	Qualification
1	Poland	3	2	1	0	6	2	+4	7	Elite round
2	Bulgaria	3	1	1	1	5	5	0	4 (Note: Ranked by head-to-head record (Bulgaria: 3 pts; Luxembourg: 0 pts).)	Elite round
3	Luxembourg	3	1	1	1	5	5	0	4	
4	Cyprus (H)	3	0	1	2	4	8	−4	1	

Source: UEFA
Rules for classification: Qualification tiebreakers
(H) Hosts
Notes:
11 November 2015
13:30

Bulgaria	0–1	Poland
	Report	Świderski 90+3'

Pafiako Stadium, Paphos
Referee: Sergei Lapochkin (Russia)
11 November 2015
13:30

Cyprus	1–2	Luxembourg
Charalambous 6'	Report	Muratovic 13'; Da Silva 67'

Koukila Community Stadium, Paphos
Referee: Andrew Dallas (Scotland)

13 November 2015
13:30

Bulgaria	2–1	Luxembourg
Bohnert 6' (o.g.); Al. Georgiev 21'	Report	Muratovic 63'

Pafiako Stadium, Paphos
Referee: Svein-Erik Edvartsen (Norway)
13 November 2015
13:30

Poland	3–0	Cyprus
Ryczkowski 7', 17'; Świderski 88'	Report

Koukila Community Stadium, Paphos
Referee: Andrew Dallas (Scotland)

16 November 2015
13:30

Cyprus	3–3	Bulgaria
G. Christodoulou 29'; Malekkides 47'; Kallis 82'	Report	Kraev 41'; Al. Georgiev 58', 63'

Koukila Community Stadium, Paphos
Referee: Sergei Lapochkin (Russia)
16 November 2015
13:30

Luxembourg	2–2	Poland
Muratovic 3', 17'	Report	Świderski 7'; Janicki 63'

Pafiako Stadium, Paphos
Referee: Svein-Erik Edvartsen (Norway)

==== Group 4 ====
Pos	Team	Pld	W	D	L	GF	GA	GD	Pts	Qualification
1	England	3	2	1	0	3	0	+3	7	Elite round
2	Italy	3	1	2	0	4	3	+1	5	Elite round
3	Finland	3	1	1	1	3	3	0	4	
4	Macedonia (H)	3	0	0	3	3	7	−4	0	

Source: UEFA
Rules for classification: Qualification tiebreakers
(H) Hosts
8 October 2015
15:00

Italy	1–1	Finland
Vido 26' (pen.)	Report	Väisänen 33'

Boris Trajkovski Stadium, Skopje
Referee: Alejandro Hernandez (Spain)
8 October 2015
15:00

England	2–0	Macedonia
Armstrong 67'; Maitland-Niles 90+4'	Report

Training Centre Petar Miloševski, Skopje
Referee: Mete Kalkavan (Turkey)

10 October 2015
13:00

Finland	0–1	England
	Report	Abraham 73'

Training Centre Petar Miloševski, Skopje
Referee: Mete Kalkavan (Turkey)
10 October 2015
15:00

Italy	3–2	Macedonia
Vido 11' (pen.), 69', 71'	Report	Alomeroviс 16'; Jevtoski 34' (pen.)

Training Centre Petar Miloševski, Skopje
Referee: Nicolas Laforge (Belgium)

13 October 2015
15:00

England	0–0	Italy
	Report

Philip II Arena, Skopje
Referee: Alejandro Hernandez (Spain)
13 October 2015
15:00

Macedonia	1–2	Finland
Petkovski 84' (pen.)	Report	Peiponen 56'; Jakonen 69'

Training Centre Petar Miloševski, Skopje
Referee: Nicolas Laforge (Belgium)

==== Group 5 ====
Pos	Team	Pld	W	D	L	GF	GA	GD	Pts	Qualification
1	Turkey	3	2	0	1	6	5	+1	6 (Note: Ranked by head-to-head record (Turkey: 3 pts; Ukraine: 0 pts).)	Elite round
2	Ukraine	3	2	0	1	10	5	+5	6	Elite round
3	Azerbaijan (H)	3	1	0	2	1	5	−4	3 (Note: Ranked by head-to-head record (Azerbaijan: 3 pts; Bosnia and Herzegovina: 0 pts).)	
4	Bosnia and Herzegovina	3	1	0	2	3	5	−2	3	

Source: UEFA
Rules for classification: Qualification tiebreakers
(H) Hosts
Notes:
10 November 2015
11:00

Turkey	1–2	Bosnia and Herzegovina
Özcan 13'	Report	Mustedanagić 50'; Gojak 79'

Bayil Stadium, Baku
Referee: Nicolas Rainville (France)
10 November 2015
15:00

Ukraine	4–0	Azerbaijan
Shevchenko 47'; Schebetun 62'; Pikhalyonok 87' (pen.); Hutsulyak 90+4'	Report

Bayil Stadium, Baku
Referee: Tore Hansen (Norway)

12 November 2015
11:00

Bosnia and Herzegovina	1–3	Ukraine
Hadžiahmetović 10'	Report	Hutsulyak 45', 83'; Schebetun 64'

Bayil Stadium, Baku
Referee: Tore Hansen (Norway)
12 November 2015
15:00

Turkey	1–0	Azerbaijan
Balıkçı 57'	Report

Bayil Stadium, Baku
Referee: Eiko Saar (Estonia)

15 November 2015
15:00

Ukraine	3–4	Turkey
Shved 3'; Schebetun 15'; Pikhalyonok 29'	Report	Canlı 49'; Ünder 70' (pen.); Özcan 76'; Beşir 78'

Dalga Arena, Baku
Referee: Nicolas Rainville (France)
15 November 2015
15:00

Azerbaijan	1–0	Bosnia and Herzegovina
Mustafazade 41'	Report

Bayil Stadium, Baku
Referee: Eiko Saar (Estonia)

==== Group 6 ====
Pos	Team	Pld	W	D	L	GF	GA	GD	Pts	Qualification
1	Israel	3	2	1	0	7	2	+5	7	Elite round
2	Denmark	3	1	2	0	4	1	+3	5	Elite round
3	Iceland	3	1	1	1	3	5	−2	4	
4	Malta (H)	3	0	0	3	1	7	−6	0	

Source: UEFA
Rules for classification: Qualification tiebreakers
(H) Hosts
10 November 2015
14:00

Israel	3–1	Malta
Mahamid 37', 48'; Sfuri 90+4'	Report	J. Grech 15' (pen.)

Victor Tedesco Stadium, Ħamrun
Referee: Neil Doyle (Republic of Ireland)
10 November 2015
14:00

Denmark	1–1	Iceland
Dolberg 4'	Report	Halldorsson 90+1'

Hibernians Ground, Paola
Referee: Daniel Stefański (Poland)

12 November 2015
11:30

Israel	4–1	Iceland
Mahamid 14', 16', 51'; Yerushalmi 56' (pen.)	Report	Guðjohnsen 67'

Victor Tedesco Stadium, Ħamrun
Referee: Tihomir Pejin (Croatia)
12 November 2015
14:45

Malta	0–3	Denmark
	Report	Duelund 21' (pen.), 61'; Thychosen 60'

Victor Tedesco Stadium, Ħamrun
Referee: Daniel Stefański (Poland)

15 November 2015
14:00

Denmark	0–0	Israel
	Report

Victor Tedesco Stadium, Ħamrun
Referee: Neil Doyle (Republic of Ireland)
15 November 2015
14:00

Iceland	1–0	Malta
Guðmundsson 85' (pen.)	Report

Hibernians Ground, Paola
Referee: Tihomir Pejin (Croatia)

==== Group 7 ====
Pos	Team	Pld	W	D	L	GF	GA	GD	Pts	Qualification
1	Portugal (H)	3	3	0	0	10	0	+10	9	Elite round
2	Greece	3	2	0	1	3	5	−2	6	Elite round
3	Lithuania	3	1	0	2	1	6	−5	3	
4	Moldova	3	0	0	3	1	4	−3	0	

Source: UEFA
Rules for classification: Qualification tiebreakers
(H) Hosts
10 November 2015
14:00

Greece	1–0	Lithuania
Lamprou 12'	Report

Estádio Municipal Doutor Orlando Mendes, Santa Comba Dão
Referee: Ján Valášek (Slovakia)
10 November 2015
16:00

Portugal	1–0	Moldova
Ferro 25'	Report

Estádio Municipal de Nelas, Nelas
Referee: John Beaton (Scotland)

12 November 2015
14:00

Greece	2–1	Moldova
Megaritis 2'; Stathopoulos 49'	Report	Vidalis 41' (o.g.)

Estádio Municipal de Mangualde, Mangualde
Referee: Nikola Popov (Bulgaria)
12 November 2015
16:00

Lithuania	0–5	Portugal
	Report	Carvalho 25'; G. Rodrigues 52'; Buta 67', 88'; Sanches 70'

Estádio do Fontelo, Viseu
Referee: Ján Valášek (Slovakia)

15 November 2015
16:00

Portugal	4–0	Greece
G. Rodrigues 15'; Dias 33'; Sanches 70'; A. Silva 87'	Report

Estádio do Fontelo, Viseu
Referee: John Beaton (Scotland)
15 November 2015
16:00

Moldova	0–1	Lithuania
	Report	Laučys 17'

Estádio Municipal de Nelas, Nelas
Referee: Nikola Popov (Bulgaria)

==== Group 8 ====
Pos	Team	Pld	W	D	L	GF	GA	GD	Pts	Qualification
1	Austria	3	2	1	0	5	0	+5	7	Elite round
2	Georgia (H)	3	1	1	1	3	3	0	4	Elite round
3	Albania	3	1	0	2	3	8	−5	3 (Note: Ranked by head-to-head record (Albania: 3 pts; Wales: 0 pts).)	
4	Wales	3	1	0	2	5	5	0	3	

Source: UEFA
Rules for classification: Qualification tiebreakers
(H) Hosts
Notes:
12 November 2015
10:00

Austria	3–0 Awarded	Albania
Posch 4'; Krainz 90+5'	Report	Toli 49'

Mikheil Meskhi Stadium-2, Tbilisi
Referee: Alain Bieri (Switzerland)

The match was completed with a 2–1 scoreline before a 3–0 default victory was awarded to Austria due to Albania fielding an ineligible player.

12 November 2015
11:00

Georgia	0–3	Wales
	Report	Abbruzzese 34'; James 44'; G. Thomas 45+3'

Mikheil Meskhi Stadium, Tbilisi
Referee: Srđan Jovanović (Serbia)

14 November 2015
10:00

Austria	2–0	Wales
Schlager 54'; Pavlović 66'	Report

Mikheil Meskhi Stadium-2, Tbilisi
Referee: Hugo Miguel (Portugal)
14 November 2015
11:00

Albania	0–3 Awarded	Georgia
	Report	Goshteliani 86'

Mikheil Meskhi Stadium, Tbilisi
Referee: Srđan Jovanović (Serbia)

The match was completed with a 0–1 scoreline before a 0–3 default victory was awarded to Georgia due to Albania fielding an ineligible player.

17 November 2015
11:00

Georgia	0–0	Austria
	Report

Mikheil Meskhi Stadium, Tbilisi
Referee: Alain Bieri (Switzerland)
17 November 2015
11:00

Wales	2–3	Albania
J. Thomas 34'; G. Thomas 50'	Report	Zenuni 10', 36'; Krasniqi 42'

Mikheil Meskhi Stadium-2, Tbilisi
Referee: Hugo Miguel (Portugal)

==== Group 9 ====
Pos	Team	Pld	W	D	L	GF	GA	GD	Pts	Qualification
1	Slovakia	3	1	2	0	5	3	+2	5	Elite round
2	Northern Ireland	3	1	1	1	3	4	−1	4	Elite round
3	Russia (H)	3	0	3	0	3	3	0	3	Elite round
4	Norway	3	0	2	1	4	5	−1	2	

Source: UEFA
Rules for classification: Qualification tiebreakers
(H) Hosts

Matches on the first matchday, originally to be played on 11 November (Norway v Northern Ireland at 12:00 and Russia v Slovakia at 15:00), were postponed to 12 November due to heavy rain in Sochi. Matches on the second matchday were also pushed back from 13 November to 14 November as a result.

12 November 2015
12:00

Russia	1–1	Slovakia
Obolsky 69'	Report	Greif 90+3'

Sochi Central Stadium, Sochi
Attendance: 700
Referee: Sebastian Colțescu (Romania)
12 November 2015
12:00

Norway	1–2	Northern Ireland
Bjørdal 56'	Report	Kennedy 12'; Newberry 54'

Sputnik-Sport, Sochi
Attendance: 25
Referee: Ilias Spathas (Greece)

14 November 2015
12:00

Slovakia	2–2	Norway
Balaj 57'; Bénes 65' (pen.)	Report	Samuelsen 21' (pen.), 86' (pen.)

Sputnik-Sport, Sochi
Attendance: 25
Referee: Sebastian Colțescu (Romania)
14 November 2015
15:00

Russia	1–1	Northern Ireland
Mironov 74'	Report	Kennedy 6'

Sochi Central Stadium, Sochi
Attendance: 150
Referee: Jovan Kaludjerović (Montenegro)

16 November 2015
12:00

Norway	1–1	Russia
Svendsen 63'	Report	Obolsky 25'

Sochi Central Stadium, Sochi
Attendance: 100
Referee: Ilias Spathas (Greece)
16 November 2015
12:00

Northern Ireland	0–2	Slovakia
	Report	Laczkó 26'; Bénes 89'

Sputnik-Sport, Sochi
Attendance: 25
Referee: Jovan Kaludjerović (Montenegro)

==== Group 10 ====
Pos	Team	Pld	W	D	L	GF	GA	GD	Pts	Qualification
1	France (H)	3	2	1	0	13	2	+11	7	Elite round
2	Netherlands	3	2	1	0	12	1	+11	7	Elite round
3	Liechtenstein	3	0	1	2	2	6	−4	1	
4	Gibraltar	3	0	1	2	1	19	−18	1	

Source: UEFA
Rules for classification: Qualification tiebreakers
(H) Hosts
7 October 2015
15:00

France	3–1	Liechtenstein
Augustin 1'; Lusamba 52'; Thuram 67'	Report	Frick 50'

Stade Municipal, Saint-Paul-lès-Dax
Referee: Tim Marshall (Northern Ireland)
7 October 2015
18:30

Netherlands	9–0	Gibraltar
Bergwijn 7', 74'; Lammers 26', 30', 58'; Schuurman 60', 84'; Dekker 75'; Nouri 79'	Report

Stade de l'Argenté, Mont-de-Marsan
Referee: Zbynek Proske (Czech Republic)

9 October 2015
15:00

Netherlands	2–0	Liechtenstein
Bergwijn 67'; Göppel 87' (o.g.)	Report

Stade Municipal, Saint-Paul-lès-Dax
Referee: Ivaylo Stoyanov (Bulgaria)
9 October 2015
18:30

Gibraltar	0–9	France
	Report	Augustin 3', 6', 24'; Diop 36'; Gelin 41'; Perraud 46'; Boscagli 58'; Thuram 59'; Lusamba 72'

Stade André Darrigade, Dax
Referee: Zbynek Proske (Czech Republic)

12 October 2015
15:00

France	1–1	Netherlands
Augustin 19'	Report	Van de Beek 41'

Stade de l'Argenté, Mont-de-Marsan
Referee: Ivaylo Stoyanov (Bulgaria)
12 October 2015
15:00

Liechtenstein	1–1	Gibraltar
Frick 10'	Report	Clinton 45+2'

Stade André Darrigade, Dax
Referee: Tim Marshall (Northern Ireland)

==== Group 11 ====
Pos	Team	Pld	W	D	L	GF	GA	GD	Pts	Qualification
1	Switzerland	3	3	0	0	8	1	+7	9	Elite round
2	Romania (H)	3	2	0	1	5	3	+2	6	Elite round
3	Andorra	3	0	1	2	1	4	−3	1	
4	Faroe Islands	3	0	1	2	1	7	−6	1	

Source: UEFA
Rules for classification: Qualification tiebreakers
(H) Hosts
12 November 2015
10:00

Switzerland	1–0	Andorra
Alpsoy 3'	Report

Stadionul Iuliu Bodola, Oradea
Referee: Johnny Casanova (San Marino)
12 November 2015
14:00

Romania	2–0	Faroe Islands
Stoica 42'; Petre 82'	Report

Stadionul Iuliu Bodola, Oradea
Referee: Peter Kralović (Slovakia)

14 November 2015
10:00

Faroe Islands	0–4	Switzerland
	Report	Duah 34', 39', 65'; Zeqiri 75'

Stadionul Iuliu Bodola, Oradea
Referee: Peter Kralović (Slovakia)
14 November 2015
14:00

Romania	2–0	Andorra
Ene 19', 51'	Report

Stadionul Iuliu Bodola, Oradea
Referee: Orel Grinfeld (Israel)

17 November 2015
10:00

Switzerland	3–1	Romania
Alpsoy 54'; Gjorgjev 71'; Cani 84' (pen.)	Report	Petre 20'

Stadionul Iuliu Bodola, Oradea
Referee: Orel Grinfeld (Israel)
17 November 2015
10:00

Andorra	1–1	Faroe Islands
Nazzaro 5'	Report	Olsen 74'

Paleu Stadium, Paleu
Referee: Johnny Casanova (San Marino)

==== Group 12 ====
Pos	Team	Pld	W	D	L	GF	GA	GD	Pts	Qualification
1	Czech Republic	3	3	0	0	10	3	+7	9	Elite round
2	Serbia	3	2	0	1	11	4	+7	6	Elite round
3	Estonia (H)	3	1	0	2	3	7	−4	3	
4	Armenia	3	0	0	3	0	10	−10	0	

Source: UEFA
Rules for classification: Qualification tiebreakers
(H) Hosts
8 October 2015
12:00

Czech Republic	4–0	Armenia
Mihálik 6', 20'; Kuchta 15'; Pulkrab 56'	Report

Kalevi Keskstaadion, Tallinn
Referee: Bojan Pandžić (Sweden)
8 October 2015
14:30

Serbia	5–0	Estonia
Jović 30', 50', 55' (pen.); Glavčić 35'; Šaponjić 39'	Report

Kadriorg Stadium, Tallinn
Referee: Tobias Stieler (Germany)

10 October 2015
12:00

Armenia	0–4	Serbia
	Report	Šaponjić 22', 44'; Senić 56'; Jović 62'

Kalevi Keskstaadion, Tallinn
Referee: Bojan Pandžić (Sweden)
10 October 2015
14:30

Czech Republic	2–1	Estonia
Mihálik 17'; Kuchta 78'	Report	Riiberg 66' (pen.)

Kadriorg Stadium, Tallinn
Referee: Anatolii Zhabchenko (Ukraine)

13 October 2015
14:30

Serbia	2–4	Czech Republic
Šaponjić 36', 47'	Report	Klíma 15', 19' (pen.); Ladra 63'; Kuchta 83'

Kalevi Keskstaadion, Tallinn
Referee: Tobias Stieler (Germany)
13 October 2015
14:30

Estonia	2–0	Armenia
Riiberg 21' (pen.); Mutso 51'	Report

Kadriorg Stadium, Tallinn
Referee: Anatolii Zhabchenko (Ukraine)

==== Group 13 ====
Pos	Team	Pld	W	D	L	GF	GA	GD	Pts	Qualification
1	Belgium (H)	3	2	1	0	13	2	+11	7	Elite round
2	Sweden	3	2	0	1	3	2	+1	6	Elite round
3	Belarus	3	1	1	1	8	5	+3	4	
4	San Marino	3	0	0	3	1	16	−15	0	

Source: UEFA
Rules for classification: Qualification tiebreakers
(H) Hosts
7 October 2015
15:00

Sweden	2–0	Belarus
Nilsson 82'; Larsson 90+3'	Report

Puyenbeke Stadion, Sint-Niklaas
Referee: Vadims Direktorenko (Latvia)
7 October 2015
19:00

Belgium	9–0	San Marino
Schryvers 6', 22'; Dimata 11' (pen.), 16'; Mmaee 19', 45+1'; Tshimanga 51'; Callebaut 77', 88'	Report

Puyenbeke Stadion, Sint-Niklaas
Referee: Georgi Vadachkoria (Georgia)

9 October 2015
15:00

San Marino	0–1	Sweden
	Report	Nikolić 37'

Burgemeester Van de Wielestadion, Deinze
Referee: Georgi Vadachkoria (Georgia)
9 October 2015
19:00

Belgium	2–2	Belarus
Dimata 14', 90+4'	Report	Yuzepchuk 33', 58'

Burgemeester Van de Wielestadion, Deinze
Referee: Ognjen Valjić (Bosnia and Herzegovina)

12 October 2015
19:00

Sweden	0–2	Belgium
	Report	Djim 18'; Dimata 77'

Burgemeester Van de Wielestadion, Deinze
Referee: Ognjen Valjić (Bosnia and Herzegovina)
12 October 2015
19:00

Belarus	6–1	San Marino
Ivanow 31'; Antilevsky 51', 69'; Gromyko 57'; Yuzepchuk 72'; Bakhar 78'	Report	Carlini 38'

Puyenbeke Stadion, Sint-Niklaas
Referee: Vadims Direktorenko (Latvia)

=== Ranking of third-placed teams ===
To determine the best third-placed team from the qualifying round advancing to the elite round, only the results of the third-placed teams against the first and second-placed teams in their group were taken into account.

Pos	Grp	Team	Pld	W	D	L	GF	GA	GD	Pts	Qualification
1	9	Russia	2	0	2	0	2	2	0	2	Elite round
2	3	Luxembourg	2	0	1	1	3	4	−1	1	
3	4	Finland	2	0	1	1	1	2	−1	1	
4	13	Belarus	2	0	1	1	2	4	−2	1	
5	6	Iceland	2	0	1	1	2	5	−3	1	
6	2	Hungary	2	0	1	1	1	4	−3	1	
7	11	Andorra	2	0	0	2	0	3	−3	0	
8	10	Liechtenstein	2	0	0	2	1	5	−4	0	
9	1	Republic of Ireland	2	0	0	2	0	5	−5	0 (Note: Tie broken by disciplinary points.)	
10	5	Azerbaijan	2	0	0	2	0	5	−5	0	
11	12	Estonia	2	0	0	2	1	7	−6	0	
12	7	Lithuania	2	0	0	2	0	6	−6	0	
13	8	Albania	2	0	0	2	0	6	−6	0	

Source: UEFA
Rules for classification: 1) points; 2) goal difference; 3) goals scored; 4) disciplinary points; 5) drawing of lots.

== Elite round ==
=== Draw ===
The draw for the elite round was held on 3 December 2015, 11:00 CET (UTC+1), at the UEFA headquarters in Nyon, Switzerland.

The teams were seeded according to their results in the qualifying round. Spain, which received a bye to the elite round, were automatically seeded into Pot A. Each group contained one team from Pot A, one team from Pot B, one team from Pot C, and one team from Pot D. Teams from the same qualifying round group could not be drawn in the same group. For political reasons, Russia and Ukraine (due to the Russian military intervention in Ukraine) could not be drawn in the same group.

Pos	Grp	Team	Pld	W	D	L	GF	GA	GD	Pts	Seeding
1	—	Spain	0	0	0	0	0	0	0	0	Pot A
2	7	Portugal	3	3	0	0	10	0	+10	9	Pot A
3	12	Czech Republic	3	3	0	0	10	3	+7	9	Pot A
4	11	Switzerland	3	3	0	0	8	1	+7	9	Pot A
5	13	Belgium	3	2	1	0	13	2	+11	7 (Note: Tie broken by disciplinary points.)	Pot A
6	10	France	3	2	1	0	13	2	+11	7	Pot A
7	10	Netherlands	3	2	1	0	12	1	+11	7	Pot A
8	6	Israel	3	2	1	0	7	2	+5	7	Pot B
9	3	Poland	3	2	1	0	6	2	+4	7	Pot B
10	2	Croatia	3	2	1	0	5	2	+3	7	Pot B
11	8	Austria	3	2	1	0	4	1	+3	7 (Note: The draw was held before 3–0 default victories were awarded to Austria and Georgia due to Albania fielding an ineligible player. Neither the qualified teams nor the seeding pots were affected by the changed scorelines.)	Pot B
12	4	England	3	2	1	0	3	0	+3	7	Pot B
13	1	Slovenia	3	2	1	0	2	0	+2	7	Pot B
14	12	Serbia	3	2	0	1	11	4	+7	6	Pot B
15	5	Ukraine	3	2	0	1	10	5	+5	6	Pot C
16	1	Scotland	3	2	0	1	6	1	+5	6	Pot C
17	2	Montenegro	3	2	0	1	6	4	+2	6	Pot C
18	11	Romania	3	2	0	1	5	3	+2	6	Pot C
19	5	Turkey	3	2	0	1	6	5	+1	6	Pot C
20	13	Sweden	3	2	0	1	3	2	+1	6	Pot C
21	7	Greece	3	2	0	1	3	5	−2	6	Pot C
22	6	Denmark	3	1	2	0	4	1	+3	5	Pot D
23	9	Slovakia	3	1	2	0	5	3	+2	5	Pot D
24	4	Italy	3	1	2	0	4	3	+1	5	Pot D
25	3	Bulgaria	3	1	1	1	5	5	0	4	Pot D
26	9	Northern Ireland	3	1	1	1	3	4	−1	4	Pot D
27	8	Georgia	3	1	1	1	1	3	−2	4	Pot D
28	9	Russia	3	0	3	0	3	3	0	3	Pot D

Source: UEFA
Rules for classification: 1) points; 2) goal difference; 3) goals scored; 4) disciplinary points; 5) coefficient; 6) drawing of lots.

=== Groups ===
Times up to 26 March 2016 were CET (UTC+1), thereafter times were CEST (UTC+2).

==== Group 1 ====
Pos	Team	Pld	W	D	L	GF	GA	GD	Pts	Qualification
1	England	3	2	1	0	5	2	+3	7	Final tournament
2	Spain (H)	3	1	1	1	3	3	0	4 (Note: Ranked by head-to-head record (Spain: 3 pts; Greece: 0 pts).)	
3	Greece	3	1	1	1	3	4	−1	4	
4	Georgia	3	0	1	2	3	5	−2	1	

Source: UEFA
Rules for classification: Qualification tiebreakers
(H) Hosts
Notes:
24 March 2016
12:00

Spain	2–0	Greece
Martín 22'; Mayoral 26' (pen.)	Report

Estadio Ciudad de Lepe, Lepe
Referee: Frank Schneider (France)
24 March 2016
17:00

England	2–1	Georgia
Abraham 8'; Onomah 10'	Report	Goshteliani 84'

Estadio Luis Rodríguez Salvador, Cartaya
Referee: Dominik Ouschan (Austria)

26 March 2016
12:00

Spain	1–1	Georgia
Mayoral 42'	Report	Bidzinashvili 8'

Estadio Luis Rodríguez Salvador, Cartaya
Referee: Fyodor Zammit (Malta)
26 March 2016
17:00

Greece	1–1	England
Lamprou 51'	Report	Armstrong 49' (pen.)

Estadio Ciudad de Lepe, Lepe
Referee: Dominik Ouschan (Austria)

29 March 2016
17:00

England	2–0	Spain
Onomah 6'; Armstrong 66'	Report

Estadio Ciudad de Lepe, Lepe
Referee: Frank Schneider (France)
29 March 2016
17:00

Georgia	1–2	Greece
Mikeltadze 60'	Report	Dimitriadis 42', 72'

Estadio Luis Rodríguez Salvador, Cartaya
Referee: Fyodor Zammit (Malta)

==== Group 2 ====
Pos	Team	Pld	W	D	L	GF	GA	GD	Pts	Qualification
1	Italy (H)	3	2	1	0	8	2	+6	7	Final tournament
2	Turkey	3	2	1	0	7	3	+4	7	
3	Israel	3	1	0	2	2	5	−3	3	
4	Switzerland	3	0	0	3	1	8	−7	0	

Source: UEFA
Rules for classification: Qualification tiebreakers
(H) Hosts
25 March 2016
12:00

Switzerland	1–4	Turkey
Sow 5'	Report	Günaslan 40'; Ünder 49' (pen.), 60'; Karakoç 52'

Stadio Comunale di Caldogno, Caldogno
Referee: Kevin Clancy (Scotland)
25 March 2016
15:30

Israel	0–4	Italy
	Report	Panico 9'; Felicioli 29'; Favilli 44'; Coppolaro 73'

Stadio Euganeo, Padua
Referee: Fran Jović (Croatia)

27 March 2016
12:00

Turkey	1–0	Israel
Demiral 56'	Report

Stadio Romeo Menti, Vicenza
Referee: Fran Jović (Croatia)
27 March 2016
18:00

Switzerland	0–2	Italy
	Report	Ghiglione 75'; Dimarco 81' (pen.)

Stadio Euganeo, Padua
Referee: João Pinheiro (Portugal)

30 March 2016
15:00

Israel	2–0	Switzerland
Galili 38'; Loosli 65' (o.g.)	Report

Stadio Euganeo, Padua
Referee: Kevin Clancy (Scotland)
30 March 2016
15:00

Italy	2–2	Turkey
Favilli 59'; Edera 88'	Report	Kanatsızkuş 89'; Özcan 90+2'

Stadio Comunale di Caldogno, Caldogno
Referee: João Pinheiro (Portugal)

==== Group 3 ====
Pos	Team	Pld	W	D	L	GF	GA	GD	Pts	Qualification
1	Austria (H)	3	3	0	0	10	2	+8	9	Final tournament
2	Slovakia	3	2	0	1	6	5	+1	6	
3	Czech Republic	3	1	0	2	5	5	0	3	
4	Romania	3	0	0	3	1	10	−9	0	

Source: UEFA
Rules for classification: Qualification tiebreakers
(H) Hosts
24 March 2016
11:00

Czech Republic	3–0	Romania
Mihálik 5' (pen.); Pulkrab 22'; Trubač 34'	Report

Thermenstadion, Bad Waltersdorf
Referee: Sergey Ivanov (Russia)
24 March 2016
18:00

Austria	3–1	Slovakia
Jakupović 10' (pen.), 52'; Prokop 11'	Report	Hancko 73'

Gansbärenstadion, Rohrbach an der Lafnitz
Referee: Jari Järvinen (Finland)

26 March 2016
11:00

Czech Republic	1–2	Slovakia
Štěpánek 41'	Report	Kopičár 5' (pen.); Mráz 30'

Solarstadion Gleisdorf, Gleisdorf
Referee: Zaven Hovhannisyan (Armenia)
26 March 2016
15:30

Romania	0–4	Austria
	Report	Prokop 13', 37'; Malicsek 67'; Jakupović 82' (pen.)

Thermenstadion, Bad Waltersdorf
Referee: Jari Järvinen (Finland)

29 March 2016
18:00

Austria	3–1	Czech Republic
Prokop 34'; Grabovac 78'; Posch 84'	Report	Pulkrab 55'

Solarstadion Gleisdorf, Gleisdorf
Referee: Sergey Ivanov (Russia)
29 March 2016
18:00

Slovakia	3–1	Romania
Šalata 30'; Špalek 43'; Jirka 69'	Report	Ene 38'

Gansbärenstadion, Rohrbach an der Lafnitz
Referee: Zaven Hovhannisyan (Armenia)

==== Group 4 ====
Pos	Team	Pld	W	D	L	GF	GA	GD	Pts	Qualification
1	Netherlands (H)	3	2	1	0	4	2	+2	7	Final tournament
2	Poland	3	1	2	0	2	1	+1	5	
3	Ukraine	3	1	1	1	4	3	+1	4	
4	Northern Ireland	3	0	0	3	1	5	−4	0	

Source: UEFA
Rules for classification: Qualification tiebreakers
(H) Hosts
24 March 2016
16:30

Poland	2–1	Northern Ireland
Świderski 14', 84'	Report	Lavery 33'

Sportpark Parkzicht, Uden
Referee: Alain Durieux (Luxembourg)
24 March 2016
19:30

Netherlands	3–2	Ukraine
Lammers 8'; Van de Beek 26'; Nouri 71' (pen.)	Report	Fursov 36'; Shved 38'

Sportpark Zuid, Groesbeek
Referee: Juan Martínez Munuera (Spain)

26 March 2016
13:00

Ukraine	0–0	Poland
	Report

Sportpark Zuid, Groesbeek
Referee: Alain Durieux (Luxembourg)
26 March 2016
16:00

Netherlands	1–0	Northern Ireland
Eiting 59'	Report

Sportpark Parkzicht, Uden
Referee: Rahim Hasanov (Azerbaijan)

29 March 2016
19:30

Poland	0–0	Netherlands
	Report

Sportpark Zuid, Groesbeek
Referee: Juan Martínez Munuera (Spain)
29 March 2016
19:30

Northern Ireland	0–2	Ukraine
	Report	Pikhalyonok 29'; Tsygankov 83'

Sportpark Parkzicht, Uden
Referee: Rahim Hasanov (Azerbaijan)

==== Group 5 ====
Pos	Team	Pld	W	D	L	GF	GA	GD	Pts	Qualification
1	Croatia (H)	3	3	0	0	8	0	+8	9	Final tournament
2	Belgium	3	2	0	1	3	4	−1	6	
3	Scotland	3	1	0	2	2	6	−4	3	
4	Bulgaria	3	0	0	3	1	4	−3	0	

Source: UEFA
Rules for classification: Qualification tiebreakers
(H) Hosts
23 March 2016
12:30

Belgium	2–0	Scotland
Van Landschoot 5'; Mmaee 85'	Report

Stadion Žuknica, Kostrena
Referee: Anatoliy Abdula (Ukraine)
23 March 2016
16:00

Croatia	1–0	Bulgaria
Brekalo 53'	Report

Stadion Kantrida, Rijeka
Referee: Petr Ardeleánu (Czech Republic)

25 March 2016
13:00

Belgium	1–0	Bulgaria
Cuypers 81'	Report

Stadion Žuknica, Kostrena
Referee: Jørgen Burchardt (Denmark)
25 March 2016
16:00

Scotland	0–3	Croatia
	Report	Brodić 36'; Turčin 47'; Brekalo 77'

Stadion Kantrida, Rijeka
Referee: Petr Ardeleánu (Czech Republic)

28 March 2016
16:00

Croatia	4–0	Belgium
Benković 37'; Brodić 45'; Lovren 76'; Knežević 90'	Report

Stadion Rujevica, Rijeka
Referee: Anatoliy Abdula (Ukraine)
28 March 2016
16:00

Bulgaria	1–2	Scotland
Al. Georgiev 38'	Report	Hardie 15'; Kiltie 78' (pen.)

Stadion Žuknica, Kostrena
Referee: Jørgen Burchardt (Denmark)

==== Group 6 ====
Pos	Team	Pld	W	D	L	GF	GA	GD	Pts	Qualification
1	Portugal (H)	3	2	1	0	8	2	+6	7	Final tournament
2	Slovenia	3	2	0	1	5	4	+1	6	
3	Russia	3	1	1	1	3	3	0	4	
4	Sweden	3	0	0	3	2	9	−7	0	

Source: UEFA
Rules for classification: Qualification tiebreakers
(H) Hosts
24 March 2016
15:00

Slovenia	1–0	Russia
Elšnik 87'	Report

Complexo Desportivo Clube de Futebol de Fão, Apúlia e Fão
Referee: Dejan Jakimovski (Macedonia)
24 March 2016
17:00

Portugal	4–0	Sweden
A. Silva 13'; Buta 23', 24'; Rodrigues 64'	Report

Estádio do Rio Ave FC, Vila do Conde
Referee: Padraig Sutton (Republic of Ireland)

26 March 2016
15:00

Sweden	1–3	Slovenia
Drešević 82'	Report	Elšnik 36'; Kramarič 38', 46'

Estádio do Varzim SC, Póvoa de Varzim
Referee: Dejan Jakimovski (Macedonia)
26 March 2016
17:00

Portugal	1–1	Russia
Delgado 41'	Report	Obolsky 90'

Estádio Cidade de Barcelos, Barcelos
Referee: Alexandros Aretopoulos (Greece)

29 March 2016
17:00

Slovenia	1–3	Portugal
Tijanić 79'	Report	Dias 17'; Costa 18'; Delgado 72'

Estádio do Rio Ave FC, Vila do Conde
Referee: Padraig Sutton (Republic of Ireland)
29 March 2016
17:00

Russia	2–1	Sweden
Melkadze 63' (pen.); Zhamaletdinov 78'	Report	Nilsson 15'

Estádio do Varzim SC, Póvoa de Varzim
Referee: Alexandros Aretopoulos (Greece)

==== Group 7 ====
Pos	Team	Pld	W	D	L	GF	GA	GD	Pts	Qualification
1	France	3	3	0	0	6	0	+6	9	Final tournament
2	Denmark	3	1	1	1	9	7	+2	4	
3	Serbia (H)	3	1	1	1	6	4	+2	4	
4	Montenegro	3	0	0	3	2	12	−10	0	

Source: UEFA
Rules for classification: Qualification tiebreakers
(H) Hosts
24 March 2016
14:30

France	1–0	Montenegro
Blas 53'	Report

Jagodina City Stadium, Jagodina
Referee: Robert Madley (England)
24 March 2016
14:30

Serbia	2–2	Denmark
Šaponjić 60'; Mijailović 84'	Report	Duelund 56' (pen.); Bruun Larsen 76'

Čika Dača Stadium, Kragujevac
Referee: Alper Ulusoy (Turkey)

26 March 2016
14:30

France	4–0	Denmark
Mbappé 9'; Onguéné 13'; Diop 53'; Thuram 56'	Report

Jagodina City Stadium, Jagodina
Referee: Georgios Kominis (Greece)
26 March 2016
14:30

Montenegro	1–4	Serbia
O. Sarkic 21'	Report	Jović 33' (pen.); Duronjić 37', 51'; Milenković 54'

Metalac Stadium, Gornji Milanovac
Referee: Alper Ulusoy (Turkey)

29 March 2016
14:30

Serbia	0–1	France
	Report	Mbappé 41'

Čika Dača Stadium, Kragujevac
Referee: Robert Madley (England)
29 March 2016
14:30

Denmark	7–1	Montenegro
Veber 4', 19', 53', 67'; Rasmussen 30'; Laursen 49'; Duelund 59'	Report	Vorotović 17'

Jagodina City Stadium, Jagodina
Referee: Georgios Kominis (Greece)

== Qualified teams ==
The following eight teams qualified for the final tournament:

Team	Qualified as	Qualified on	Previous appearances in tournament^{1} only U-19 era (since 2002)
Germany	Hosts	20 March 2012	7 (2002, 2004, 2005, 2007, **2008**, **2014**, 2015)
England	Elite round Group 1 winners	29 March 2016	7 (2002, 2003, 2005, 2008, 2009, 2010, 2012)
Italy	Elite round Group 2 winners	30 March 2016	4 (**2003**, 2004, 2008, 2010)
Austria	Elite round Group 3 winners	29 March 2016	6 (2003, 2006, 2007, 2010, 2014, 2015)
Netherlands	Elite round Group 4 winners	29 March 2016	3 (2010, 2013, 2015)
Croatia	Elite round Group 5 winners	28 March 2016	2 (2010, 2012)
Portugal	Elite round Group 6 winners	29 March 2016	7 (2003, 2006, 2007, 2010, 2012, 2013, 2014)
France	Elite round Group 7 winners	29 March 2016	8 (2003, **2005**, 2007, 2009, **2010**, 2012, 2013, 2015)

^{1} Bold indicates champion for that year. Italic indicates host for that year.

== Top goalscorers ==
The following players scored four goals or more in the qualifying competition:

6 goals

- (Serbia) Ivan Šaponjić

5 goals

- (Belgium) Nany Dimata
- (France) Jean-Kévin Augustin
- (Israel) Anas Mahamid
- (Poland) Karol Świderski
- (Serbia) Luka Jović

4 goals

- (Austria) Dominik Prokop
- (Bulgaria) Aleksandar Georgiev
- (Czech Republic) Ondřej Mihálik
- (Denmark) Mikkel Duelund
- (Denmark) Kristian Veber
- (Italy) Luca Vido
- (Luxembourg) Edvin Muratovic
- (Netherlands) Sam Lammers
- (Portugal) Aurélio Buta
