= 2015 Panda Cup =

Tournament details
- Host country: China
- City: Chengdu, Sichuan
- Dates: 24–28 June 2015
- Teams: 4 (from 2 confederations)
- Venue: 1 (in 1 host city)

Final positions
- Champions: Japan (1st title)
- Runners-up: Slovakia
- Third place: China
- Fourth place: Kyrgyzstan

Tournament statistics
- Matches played: 6
- Goals scored: 24 (4 per match)
- Top scorer(s): (Japan) Koki Ogawa (5 goals)
- Best player: (Japan) Takumi Sasaki
- Best goalkeeper: (China) Zhang Yan

The 2015 Panda Cup was the second edition of Panda Cup, an under-19 association football competition. The tournament was hosted in Chengdu between 24 and 28 June 2015. Players born on or after 1 January 1997 are eligible to compete in the tournament.

== Participating teams ==
Team	Confederation
China (host)	AFC
Japan	AFC
Kyrgyzstan	AFC
Slovakia	UEFA

== Venues ==
Chengdu	Shuangliu Sports Centre is located in China
Chengdu Shuangliu Sports Center	Shuangliu Sports Centre is located in China
30.5704°N 103.8957°E	Shuangliu Sports Centre is located in China
Capacity: 25,000	Shuangliu Sports Centre is located in China

== Standings ==
Pos	Team	Pld	W	D	L	GF	GA	GD	Pts
1	Japan (C)	3	3	0	0	13	2	+11	9
2	Slovakia	3	2	0	1	6	4	+2	6
3	China	3	1	0	2	4	7	−3	3
4	Kyrgyzstan	3	0	0	3	1	11	−10	0

Source: Unknown
Rules for classification: 1) Points; 2) Head to head; 3) Goal difference; 4) Number of goals scored;
(C) Champions

== Matches ==
All times are China Standard Time (UTC+08:00)

24 June 2015
16:00

China	1–2	Slovakia
Yang Liyu 38'		Kopičár 10' (pen.); Balaj 85'

Chengdu Shuangliu Sports Center
Referee: Shi Zhenlu (China)
24 June 2015
19:30

Japan	6–0	Kyrgyzstan
Ogawa 8', 54'; Urata 18'; Ichimi 60', 89'; Iwasaki 90+3'

Chengdu Shuangliu Sports Center

26 June 2015
16:00

Slovakia	3–1	Kyrgyzstan
Horník 9'; Šalata 35'; Zagidulin 70' (o.g.)		Mambetaliev 14'

Chengdu Shuangliu Sports Center
26 June 2015
19:30

China	1–5	Japan
Yang Liyu 34'		Kishimoto 6', 53', 67', 69'; Ogawa 83'

Chengdu Shuangliu Sports Center
Referee: Fu Ming (China)

28 June 2015
16:00

Japan	2–1	Slovakia
Ogawa 17', 20'		Kopičár 68' (pen.)

Chengdu Shuangliu Sports Center
28 June 2015
19:30

Kyrgyzstan	0–2	China
		Murzashev 20' (o.g.); Yang Liyu 77'

Chengdu Shuangliu Sports Center
Referee: Shi Zhenlu (China)

== Goalscorers ==
5 goals

- (Japan) Koki Ogawa

4 goals

- (Japan) Takeru Kishimoto

3 goals

- (China) Yang Liyu

2 goals

- (Japan) Kazunari Ichimi
- (Slovakia) Adrián Kopičár

1 goal

- (Japan) Yuto Iwasaki
- (Japan) Itsuki Urata
- (Kyrgyzstan) Aidar Mambetaliev
- (Slovakia) Filip Balaj
- (Slovakia) Denis Horník
- (Slovakia) Tomáš Šalata

Own goals

- (Kyrgyzstan) Azat Murzashev (against China PR)
- (Kyrgyzstan) Danislam Zagidulin (against Slovakia)
