= 2018 Panda Cup =

Tournament details
- Host country: China
- City: Chengdu
- Dates: 23–27 May 2018
- Teams: 4 (from 3 confederations)
- Venue: 1 (in 1 host city)

Final positions
- Champions: China (1st title)
- Runners-up: England
- Third place: Hungary
- Fourth place: Uruguay

Tournament statistics
- Matches played: 6
- Goals scored: 17 (2.83 per match)
- Top scorer(s): (China) Guo Tianyu (England) Nya Kirby (Uruguay) Nicolás Schiappacasse (2 goals each)
- Best player: (England) Ian Poveda-Ocampo
- Best goalkeeper: (China) Peng Peng

The 2018 Panda Cup was the fifth edition of the under-19 association football competition.

The tournament was hosted in Chengdu between 23 and 27 May. Players born on or after 1 January 1999 are eligible to compete in the tournament.

== Participating teams ==
In May 2018, it was announced that hosts China would join England, Hungary and Uruguay by participating in the 2018 Panda Cup.

Team	Confederation
China (host)	AFC
England	UEFA
Hungary	UEFA
Uruguay	CONMEBOL

== Venues ==
Chengdu	Shuangliu Sports Centre is located in China
Chengdu Shuangliu Sports Center	Shuangliu Sports Centre is located in China
30.5704°N 103.8957°E	Shuangliu Sports Centre is located in China
Capacity: 25,000	Shuangliu Sports Centre is located in China

== Matches ==
Pos	Team	Pld	W	D	L	GF	GA	GD	Pts
1	China (C)	3	3	0	0	8	1	+7	9
2	England	3	1	1	1	3	3	0	4
3	Hungary	3	1	0	2	2	6	−4	3
4	Uruguay	3	0	1	2	4	7	−3	1

Source: www.fa.org.cn
Rules for classification: 1) Points; 2) Head to head; 3) Goal difference; 4) Number of goals scored;
(C) Champions

All times are China Standard Time (UTC+08:00)

23 May 2018
15:00

England	2–2	Uruguay
Kirby 63' (pen.); Nmecha 72'	Report	Vecino 15'; Schiappacasse 78'

Chengdu Shuangliu Sports Center
Referee: Tang Shunqi (China)
23 May 2018
19:00

China	4–0	Hungary
Jiang Shenglong 36'; Guo Tianyu 42'; Xu Lei 82'; Tao Qianglong 87'	Report (in Chinese)

Chengdu Shuangliu Sports Center
Referee: Ai Kun (China)

25 May 2018
15:00

Uruguay	1–2	Hungary
Ferrares 78'	Report (in Hungarian)	Krebsz 41'; Daróczi 70'

Chengdu Shuangliu Sports Center
Referee: Jin Jingyuan (China)
25 May 2018
19:00

England	0–1	China
	Report (in Chinese)	Guo Tianyu 79'

Chengdu Shuangliu Sports Center
Referee: Shen Yinhao (China)

27 May 2018
15:00

Hungary	0–1	England
	Report (in Hungarian)	Kirby 11'

Chengdu Shuangliu Sports Center
Referee: Jin Jingyuan (China)
27 May 2018
19:00

China	3–1	Uruguay
Zhu Chenjie 4'; Liu Ruofan 80'; Xu Haoyang 87'	Report (in Chinese)	Schiappacasse 17' (pen.)

Chengdu Shuangliu Sports Center
Referee: Tang Shunqi (China)

== Goalscorers ==
2 goals

- (China) Guo Tianyu
- (England) Nya Kirby
- (Uruguay) Nicolás Schiappacasse

1 goals

- (China) Jiang Shenglong
- (China) Liu Ruofan
- (China) Tao Qianglong
- (China) Xu Haoyang
- (China) Xu Lei
- (China) Zhu Chenjie
- (England) Felix Nmecha
- (Hungary) Máté Krebsz
- (Hungary) Zoltán Daróczi
- (Uruguay) Brian Ferrares
- (Uruguay) Thiago Vecino
