= Petar Pavlović =

Petar Pavlović may refer to:

- Petar Pavlović (footballer, born 1987), Serbian football player
- Petar Pavlović (footballer, born 1997), Austrian football player
- Petar Pavlović (geologist) (1864–1938), Serbian geologist
- Petar I Pavlović (died 1420), Grand Duke of Bosnia
- Petar II Pavlović (1425–1463), Grand Duke of Bosnia
