= 2014 Panda Cup =

Tournament details
- Host country: China
- City: Chengdu, Sichuan
- Dates: 4–8 June 2014
- Teams: 4 (from 4 confederations)
- Venue: 2 (in 1 host city)

Final positions
- Champions: Brazil (1st title)
- Runners-up: Croatia
- Third place: China
- Fourth place: New Zealand

Tournament statistics
- Matches played: 6
- Goals scored: 15 (2.5 per match)
- Top scorer: (Brazil) Ewandro (3 goals)
- Best player: (Brazil) Gabriel Boschilia

The 2014 Panda Cup was the inaugural edition of Panda Cup, an under-19 association football competition. The tournament was hosted in Chengdu between 4 and 8 June 2014. Players born on or after 1 January 1995 are eligible to compete in the tournament.

== Participating teams ==
Team	Confederation
Brazil	CONMEBOL
China (host)	AFC
Croatia	UEFA
New Zealand	OFC

== Venues ==
China
Chengdu		2014 Panda Cup is located in China
Shuangliu Sports Centre	Dujiangyan Phoenix Stadium	2014 Panda Cup is located in China
30.5704°N 103.8957°E	30.9763°N 103.6499°E	2014 Panda Cup is located in China
Capacity: 25,000	Capacity: 12,700	2014 Panda Cup is located in China

== Standings ==
Pos	Team	Pld	W	D	L	GF	GA	GD	Pts
1	Brazil (C)	3	2	1	0	8	2	+6	7
2	Croatia	3	2	0	1	4	5	−1	6
3	China	3	1	0	2	2	5	−3	3
4	New Zealand	3	0	1	2	1	3	−2	1

Source: Unknown
Rules for classification: 1) Points; 2) Head to head; 3) Goal difference; 4) Number of goals scored;
(C) Champions

== Matches ==
All times are China Standard Time (UTC+08:00)

4 June 2014
15:00

China	1–0	New Zealand
Liu Haidong 24' (pen.)

Dujiangyan Phoenix Stadium
Referee: Fu Ming (China)
4 June 2014
19:00

Brazil	4–1	Croatia
Leandro 3'; Ewandro; Gerson		Mance 48'

Chengdu Shuangliu Sports Center

6 June 2014
15:00

Brazil	0–0	New Zealand

Chengdu Shuangliu Sports Center
6 June 2014
19:00

China	0–1	Croatia
		Faletar 76'

Chengdu Shuangliu Sports Center
Referee: Tan Hai (China)

8 June 2014
15:00

Croatia	2–1	New Zealand
Ćaleta-Car 41'; Faletar 62'		Ćaleta-Car 6' (o.g.)

Chengdu Shuangliu Sports Center
8 June 2014
19:00

China	1–4	Brazil
Liu Haidong 89'		Ewandro 7', 9'; Boschilia 32', 48'

Chengdu Shuangliu Sports Center
Referee: Fu Ming (China)

== Goalscorers ==
3 goals

- (Brazil) Ewandro

2 goals

- (Brazil) Gabriel Boschilia
- (Brazil) Gerson
- (China) Liu Haidong
- (Croatia) Filip Faletar

1 goal

- (Brazil) Leandro
- (Croatia) Duje Ćaleta-Car
- (Croatia) Antonio Mance

Own goal

- (Croatia) Duje Ćaleta-Car (against New Zealand)
