= Xu Lei =

Xu Lei may refer to:

- Xu Lei (ice hockey)
- Xu Lei (footballer)
