= Federico Zenuni =

Footballer (born 1997)

Personal information
- Date of birth: 19 January 1997 (age 29)
- Place of birth: Turin, Italy
- Height: 1.82 m (6 ft 0 in)
- Position: Midfielder

Team information
- Current team: ASD Sambiase 2023
- Number: 21

Youth career
- 2003–2016: Torino

Senior career*
Years	Team	Apps	(Gls)
2016–2018	Torino	0	(0)
2016–2017	→ Tuttocuoio (loan)	24	(1)
2017–2018	→ Viterbese Castrense (loan)	19	(0)
2018–2019	Teramo	7	(0)
2019–2021	Virtus Francavilla	76	(4)
2021–2022	Potenza	29	(1)
2023–2024	Chieri	32	(4)
2024	Bylis	0	(0)
2024–2025	Luese Cristo Alessandria		
2025–2026	Reggina	1	(0)
2026	Lucchese		
2026–	ASD Sambiase 2023	0	(0)

International career
2011	Italy U15	1	(0)
2013–2014	Albania U17	5	(0)
2015	Albania U19	3	(2)
2016	Albania U21	1	(0)
- * Club domestic league appearances and goals as of 27 September 2026

Federico Zenuni (born 19 January 1997) is a professional footballer who plays as a midfielder for Serie D club ASD Sambiase 2023. Born in Italy, he represented for the Albania at youth level.

== Club career ==
=== Early career ===
Zenuni started his youth career aged 6 with Torino In 2014 he advanced at the Primavera team and won the 2014–15 Campionato Nazionale Primavera beating Lazio Primavera in the final. He was part of the team also in the next season and participated in the 2015–16 UEFA Youth League Domestic Champions Path.

=== Loan to Tuttocuoio ===
On 25 July 2016, Torino decided to loan Zenuni at Lega Pro side Tuttocuoio for the 2016–17 season.

He made it his professional debut at Tuttocuoio on 11 September 2016 against Lupa Roma coming on as a substitute in the 69th minute in place of Marco Berardi.

=== Loan to Viterbese Castrense ===
Zenuni was loaned one more time at Serie C moving on 27 July 2017 to Viterbese Castrense.

=== Teramo ===
On 11 July 2018, he moved on a permanent basis to the Serie C club Teramo.

=== Virtus Francavila ===
On 14 January 2019, he signed with Virtus Francavilla.

== International career ==
=== Italy U15 ===
Zenuni was gathered with Italy U15 national team in 2011.

=== Albania U19 ===
Zenuni was called up to the Albania U19 national team by coach Arjan Bellaj to participate in the 2016 UEFA European Under-19 Championship qualification from 12 to 17 November 2015. He played two full 90-minute matches, in the opening one against Austria U19 which finished as a 2–1 loss and against Georgia U19 two days later which ended 1–0. In the closing game against Wales U19, Zenuni scored twice to send Albania U19 in advantage in both cases and following a goal later by Ardian Krasniqi in the 42nd minute, Albania U19 ended by taking the 3–2 victory.

=== Albania U21 ===
Zenuni received his first call up at the Albania U21 by coach Skënder Gega to participate in the Antalya Cup developed in Antalya, Turkey against Saudi Arabia U21 on 22 January 2016, Bahrain U21 on 24 January, Azerbaijan U21 on 26 January, Kosovo U21 on 28 January and Ukraine U21 on 30 January.

Zenuni was called up by coach Alban Bushi for the friendly match against France U21 on 5 June 2017 and the 2019 UEFA European Under-21 Championship qualification opening match against Estonia U21 on 12 June 2017. He was not part of the 18-man squad which featured in the opening match of the qualifiers against Estonia U21.

== Career statistics ==
=== Club ===
As of 19 January 2018

Appearances and goals by club, season and competition
Club	Season	League			Cup		Europe		Other		Total	
Club	Season	Division	Apps	Goals	Apps	Goals	Apps	Goals	Apps	Goals	Apps	Goals
Tuttocuoio	2016–17	Lega Pro	24	1	3	0	—		—		27	1
Viterbese Castrense	2017–18	Serie C	10	0	3	0	—		—		13	0
Career total			34	1	6	0	—		—		40	1

=== International ===
As of 17 November 2015. Albania score listed first, score column indicates score after each Zenuni's goal.

International goals by date, venue, cap, opponent, score, result and competition
No.	Date	Venue	Cap	Opponent	Score	Result	Competition
1	17 November 2015	Mikheil Meskhi Stadium, Tbilisi, Georgia	3	Wales	1–0	3–2	2016 UEFA European Under-19 Championship qualifying round
2	17 November 2015	Mikheil Meskhi Stadium, Tbilisi, Georgia	3	Wales	2–1	3–2	2016 UEFA European Under-19 Championship qualifying round
