= Roman Yuzepchuk =

Belarusian footballer

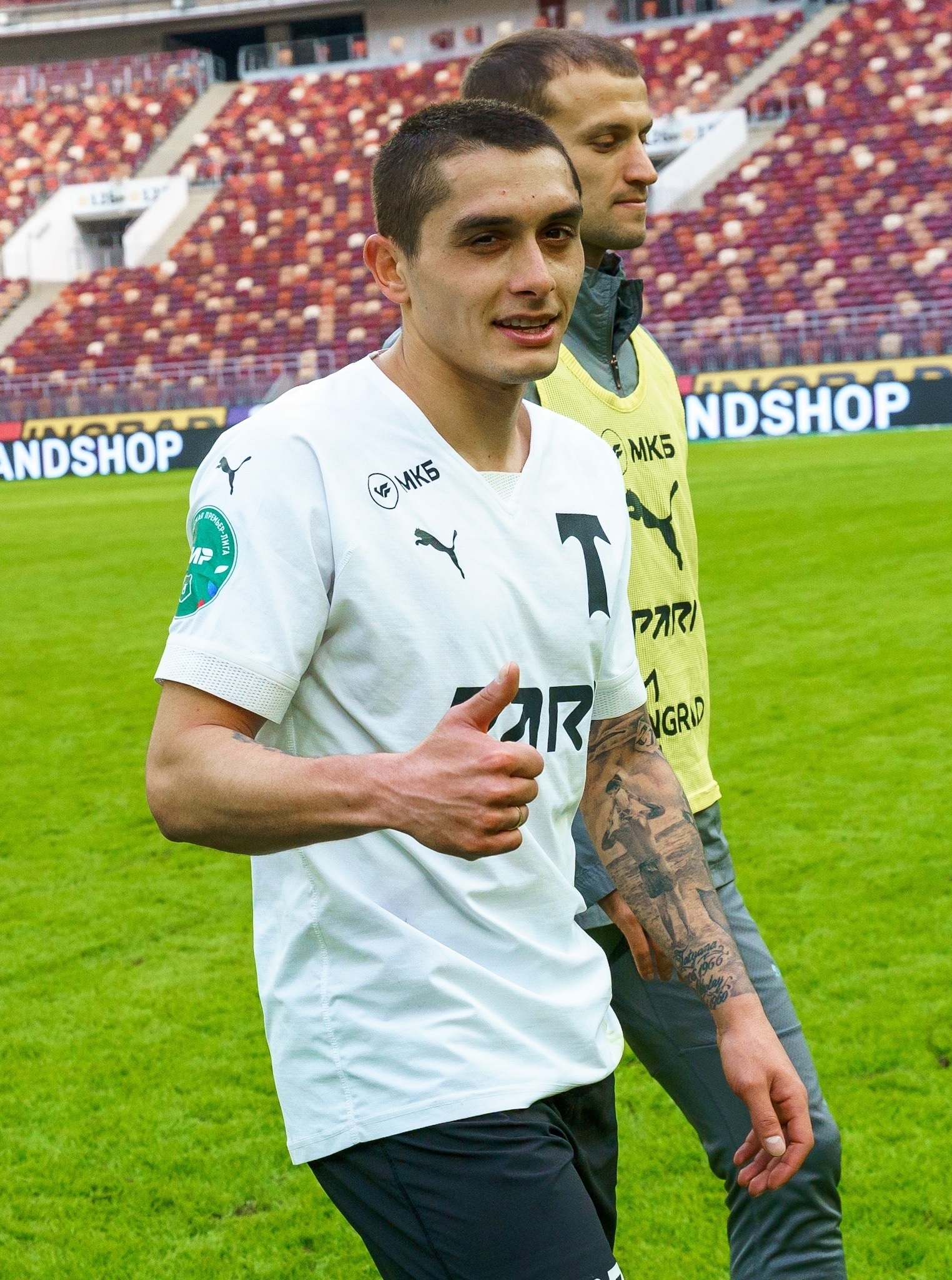
- Yuzepchuk with Torpedo Moscow in 2023

Personal information
- Full name: Roman Nikolayevich Yuzepchuk
- Date of birth: 24 July 1997 (age 29)
- Place of birth: Mogilev, Belarus
- Height: 1.72 m (5 ft 8 in)
- Position: Right-back

Team information
- Current team: Dynamo Brest
- Number: 77

Youth career
- –2013: SDYuShOR №7 Mogilev
- 2014: Dinamo Minsk

Senior career*
Years	Team	Apps	(Gls)
2015–2017	Dinamo Minsk	0	(0)
2015	→ Bereza-2010 (loan)	21	(2)
2017–2020	Dynamo Brest	56	(4)
2021	Rukh Brest	29	(0)
2022	Shakhtyor Soligorsk	24	(0)
2023	Torpedo Moscow	29	(2)
2024–2025	Khimki	12	(0)
2024–2025	→ Sokol Saratov (loan)	25	(0)
2025–	Dynamo Brest	29	(2)

International career^{‡}
2015	Belarus U-18	5	(1)
2015	Belarus U-19	5	(4)
2017–2018	Belarus U-21	5	(0)
2020–2024	Belarus	23	(1)
- * Club domestic league appearances and goals as of 6 July 2026 ‡ National team caps and goals as of 11 June 2024

Roman Nikolayevich Yuzepchuk (Belarusian: Раман Мікалаевіч Юзапчук; Russian: Роман Николаевич Юзепчук; born 24 July 1997) is a Belarusian footballer who plays as a right-back or right midfielder for Dynamo Brest and the Belarus national team.

== Club career ==
On 3 February 2023, Yuzepchuk signed with Torpedo Moscow in the Russian Premier League.

== International career ==
He has made 3 appearances and scored 3 goals playing for the Belarus national under-19 football team at the 2016 UEFA European Under-19 Championship qualification. Yuzepchuk earned his first cap for the senior team on 26 February 2020, playing as a starter for 60 minutes in the 1–0 away win over Bulgaria in a friendly match.

== Honours ==
Dinamo Brest

- Belarusian Premier League champion: 2019
- Belarusian Cup winner: 2017–18
- Belarusian Super Cup winner: 2019, 2020

== Career statistics ==
As of 25 May 2024

Club	Season	League			Cup		Continental		Other		Total	
Club	Season	Division	Apps	Goals	Apps	Goals	Apps	Goals	Apps	Goals	Apps	Goals
Bereza-2010 (loan)	2015	Belarusian First League	21	2	1	0	–		–		22	2
Dynamo Brest	2017	Belarusian Premier League	0	0	0	0	–		–		0	0
Dynamo Brest	2018	Belarusian Premier League	17	2	2	2	3 (Note: Appearances in the UEFA Europa League)	0	0	0	22	4
Dynamo Brest	2019	Belarusian Premier League	15	1	2	1	–		0	0	17	2
Dynamo Brest	2020	Belarusian Premier League	24	1	7	0	4 (Note: Three appearances in the UEFA Champions League, one appearance in the UEFA Europa League)	0	1 (Note: Appearance in the Belarusian Super Cup)	0	36	1
Dynamo Brest	Total		56	4	11	3	7	0	1	0	75	7
Rukh Brest	2021	Belarusian Premier League	29	0	2	0	–		–		31	0
Shakhtyor Soligorsk	2022	Belarusian Premier League	24	0	1	0	4 (Note: Two appearances in the UEFA Champions League, two appearances in the UEFA Europa Conference League)	0	–		29	0
Torpedo Moscow	2022–23	Russian Premier League	12	0	1	0	–		–		13	0
Torpedo Moscow	2023–24	Russian First League	17	2	0	0	–		–		17	2
Torpedo Moscow	Total		29	2	1	0	0	0	0	0	30	2
Khimki	2023–24	Russian First League	12	0	2	0	–		–		14	0
Career total			171	8	18	3	11	0	1	0	201	11

=== International ===
As of match played 11 June 2024

Appearances and goals by national team and year
National team	Year	Apps	Goals
Belarus	2020	6	1
Belarus	2021	8	0
Belarus	2022	2	0
Belarus	2023	6	0
Belarus	2024	1	0
Total		23	1

Scores and results list Belarus's goal tally first, score column indicates score after each Yuzepchuk goal.

List of international goals scored by Roman Yuzepchuk
No.	Date	Venue	Opponent	Score	Result	Competition
1	14 October 2020	Dinamo Stadium, Minsk, Belarus	Kazakhstan	2–0	2–0	2020–21 UEFA Nations League C
