= 2023 Panda Cup =

Tournament details
- Host country: China
- City: Chengdu
- Dates: TBA
- Teams: 4 (from 1 confederation)
- Venue: 1 (in 1 host city)

The 2023 Panda Cup is the seventh edition of the international youth association football competition.

Previously held as an annual under-18 and under-19 event, the tournament was cancelled between 2020 and 2022 due to the COVID-19 pandemic in China. In April 2023, Chengdu Football Association announced that the 2023 Panda Cup would take place after 4 years and will be an under-22 event to prepare for the 2024 AFC U-23 Asian Cup qualification and the 2022 Asian Games. Players born on or after 1 January 2001 are eligible to compete in the tournament.

The tournament was originally planned to be held in Chengdu between 14 and 18 June 2023. Meanwhile, on 26 May 2023, the Chinese Football Association announced that the tournament will be postponed to a later date in the year due to maintenance work at the host stadium.

== Participating teams ==
In April 2023, it was announced that hosts China had invited the under-22 team of Bahrain, Uzbekistan and Vietnam to participate in the 2023 Panda Cup.

Team	Confederation
China (host)	AFC
Bahrain	AFC
Uzbekistan	AFC
Vietnam	AFC

== Venues ==
Chengdu	Shuangliu Sports Centre is located in China
Shuangliu Sports Centre	Shuangliu Sports Centre is located in China
30.5704°N 103.8957°E	Shuangliu Sports Centre is located in China
Capacity: 26,000	Shuangliu Sports Centre is located in China

== Matches ==
Pos	Team	Pld	W	D	L	GF	GA	GD	Pts
1	Bahrain	0	0	0	0	0	0	0	0
2	China (H)	0	0	0	0	0	0	0	0
3	Uzbekistan	0	0	0	0	0	0	0	0
4	Vietnam	0	0	0	0	0	0	0	0

Source: www.thecfa.cn
Rules for classification: 1) Points; 2) Head to head; 3) Goal difference; 4) Number of goals scored;
(H) Hosts

All times are China Standard Time (UTC+08:00)

TBA
15:00

Uzbekistan	v	Vietnam

Chengdu Shuangliu Sports Center
TBA
19:00

Bahrain	v	China

Chengdu Shuangliu Sports Center

TBA
15:00

Vietnam	v	Bahrain

Chengdu Shuangliu Sports Center
TBA
19:00

China	v	Uzbekistan

Chengdu Shuangliu Sports Center

TBA
15:00

Bahrain	v	Uzbekistan

Chengdu Shuangliu Sports Center
TBA
19:00

China	v	Vietnam

Chengdu Shuangliu Sports Center
