= 2016 Panda Cup =

Tournament details
- Host country: China
- City: Chengdu, Sichuan
- Dates: 15–19 June 2016
- Teams: 4 (from 2 confederations)
- Venue: 1 (in 1 host city)

Final positions
- Champions: Japan (2nd title)
- Runners-up: Croatia
- Third place: China
- Fourth place: Czech Republic

Tournament statistics
- Matches played: 6
- Goals scored: 18 (3 per match)
- Top scorer(s): (Croatia) Josip Špoljarić (4 goals)
- Best player: (Japan) Daisuke Sakai
- Best goalkeeper: (China) Zhang Yan

The 2016 Panda Cup was the third edition of Panda Cup, an under-19 association football competition. The tournament was hosted in Chengdu between 15 and 19 June 2016. Players born on or after 1 January 1997 are eligible to compete in the tournament.

== Participating teams ==
Team	Confederation
China (host)	AFC
Croatia	UEFA
Czech Republic	UEFA
Japan	AFC

== Venues ==
Chengdu	Shuangliu Sports Centre is located in China
Chengdu Shuangliu Sports Center	Shuangliu Sports Centre is located in China
30.5704°N 103.8957°E	Shuangliu Sports Centre is located in China
Capacity: 25,000	Shuangliu Sports Centre is located in China

== Standings ==
Pos	Team	Pld	W	D	L	GF	GA	GD	Pts
1	Japan (C)	3	2	1	0	7	1	+6	7
2	Croatia	3	2	0	1	8	7	+1	6
3	China	3	0	2	1	0	3	−3	2
4	Czech Republic	3	0	1	2	3	7	−4	1

Source: Unknown
Rules for classification: 1) Points; 2) Head to head; 3) Goal difference; 4) Number of goals scored;
(C) Champions

== Matches ==
All times are China Standard Time (UTC+08:00)

15 June 2016
15:00

Japan	5–0	Croatia
Ogawa 55'; Doan 69'; Sugimori 80'; Kishimoto 82', 84'

Chengdu Shuangliu Sports Center
Referee: Tang Shunqi (China)
15 June 2016
19:00

China	0–0	Czech Republic

Chengdu Shuangliu Sports Center
Referee: Tan Hai (China)

17 June 2016
15:00

Czech Republic	1–2	Japan
Šrain 47'		Iwasaki 9'; Urata 45+1'

Chengdu Shuangliu Sports Center
Referee: Memetjan Ahmet (China)
17 June 2016
19:00

Croatia	3–0	China
Špoljarić 13', 51', 90+4'

Chengdu Shuangliu Sports Center
Referee: He Xiaohu (China)

19 June 2016
15:00

China	0–0	Japan

Chengdu Shuangliu Sports Center
Referee: Jin Jingyuan (China)
19 June 2016
19:00

Czech Republic	2–5	Croatia
Ondřej 66'; Kuchta 73' (pen.)		Martinović 10'; Čabraja 49'; Uremović 58'; Balić 87'; Špoljarić 90+4'

Chengdu Shuangliu Sports Center
Referee: Li Sicheng (China)

== Goalscorers ==
4 goals

- (Croatia) Josip Špoljarić

2 goals

- (Japan) Takeru Kishimoto

1 goal

- (Croatia) Andrija Balić
- (Croatia) Marijan Čabraja
- (Croatia) Dominik Martinović
- (Croatia) Filip Uremović
- (Czech Republic) Jan Kuchta
- (Czech Republic) Badocha Ondřej
- (Czech Republic) Jan Šrain
- (Japan) Ritsu Doan
- (Japan) Yuto Iwasaki
- (Japan) Koki Ogawa
- (Japan) Koki Sugimori
- (Japan) Itsuki Urata
