= 2019 Panda Cup =

Tournament details
- Host country: China
- City: Chengdu
- Dates: 25–29 May 2019
- Teams: 4 (from 2 confederations)
- Venue: 1 (in 1 host city)

Final positions
- Champions: South Korea
- Runners-up: Thailand
- Third place: New Zealand
- Fourth place: China

Tournament statistics
- Matches played: 6
- Goals scored: 15 (2.5 per match)
- Top scorer: (South Korea) Hwang Jae-hwan (3 goals)

The 2019 Panda Cup was the sixth edition of the international youth association football competition.

The tournament was hosted in Chengdu between 25 and 29 May 2019, and was include an international youth football development forum as part of the event. Previously held as an under-19 event, Chengdu Football Association announced that the 2019 edition would be an under-18 event.

South Korea finished top of the standings for the tournament but were later stripped of the title following prizegiving celebrations which were considered offensive and disrespectful to both the tournament hosts and the Chinese people.

== Participating teams ==
In May 2018, it was announced that hosts China had invited South Korea, New Zealand and Thailand to participate in the 2019 Panda Cup. Thailand opted to name an U-18 side in preparation for the 2019 AFF Under-18 Cup., as did China and South Korea, while New Zealand elected to send their U17 side in preparation for the 2019 FIFA U-17 World Cup later in the year,

Team	Confederation
China (host)	AFC
South Korea	AFC
New Zealand	OFC
Thailand	AFC

== Venues ==
Chengdu	Shuangliu Sports Centre is located in China
Shuangliu Sports Centre	Shuangliu Sports Centre is located in China
30.5704°N 103.8957°E	Shuangliu Sports Centre is located in China
Capacity: 26,000	Shuangliu Sports Centre is located in China

== Matches ==
Pos	Team	Pld	W	D	L	GF	GA	GD	Pts
1	South Korea	3	3	0	0	9	1	+8	9
2	Thailand	3	2	0	1	4	1	+3	6
3	New Zealand	3	1	0	2	2	5	−3	3
4	China	3	0	0	3	0	7	−7	0

Source: www.thecfa.cn
Rules for classification: 1) Points; 2) Head to head; 3) Goal difference; 4) Number of goals scored;

All times are China Standard Time (UTC+08:00)

25 May 2019
15:00

South Korea	2–1	Thailand
Heo Yool 3'; Cho Hyun-taek 10'		Anatcha Thepsiri 84'

Chengdu Shuangliu Sports Center
25 May 2019
19:00

China	0–2	New Zealand
		43' Jesse Randall; 72' (pen.) Matthew Garbett

Chengdu Shuangliu Sports Center

27 May 2019
15:00

New Zealand	0–4	South Korea
		Kim Geon-oh 36'; Lee Jin-yong 38'; Kwon Hyeok-kyu 49'; An Jae-jun 90'

Chengdu Shuangliu Sports Center
27 May 2019
19:00

Thailand	2–0	China
Achitpol Keereerom 4'; Sitthinan Rungrueang 42'

Chengdu Shuangliu Sports Center

29 May 2019
15:00

New Zealand	0–1	Thailand
		Achitpol Keereerom 2'

Chengdu Shuangliu Sports Center
29 May 2019
19:00

South Korea	3–0	China
Hwang Jae-hwan 52', 56', 79'

Chengdu Shuangliu Sports Center

== Goalscorers ==
3 goals

- (South Korea) Hwang Jae-hwan

2 goals

- (Thailand) Achitpol Keereerom

1 goal

- (South Korea) Heo Yool
- (South Korea) Cho Hyun-taek
- (South Korea) Kim Geon-oh
- (South Korea) Lee Jin-yong
- (South Korea) Kwon Hyeok-kyu
- (South Korea) An Jae-jun
- (Thailand) Anatcha Thepsiri
- (Thailand) Sitthinan Rungrueang
- (New Zealand) Jesse Randall
- (New Zealand) Matthew Garbett

== Controversies ==
Following the completion of the competition, the South Korea team was criticised for disrespecting the trophy. A South Korean player was seen to place the trophy on the ground and place his foot on it. The Panda Cup organising committee issued a formal statement on the issue and demanded an apology from the players and the South Korean representatives. South Korea were subsequently stripped of the title despite the apology.
