= Panda Cup =

- Organiser(s): CFA and Chengdu Football Association
- Founded: 2014
- Region: International
- Teams: 4
- Current champions: China (2nd title)
- Most championships: Japan and China (2 titles)
- 2026 Panda Cup

The Panda Cup International Youth Football Tournament (Chinese: 熊猫杯国际青年足球邀请赛) is an annual international youth football tournament that is held in the city of Chengdu, China.

The tournament was first announced in April 2014.

The original logo was designed by a Los Angeles–based Chinese student; it was inspired by a Chinese dragon, a giant panda and the Olympic rings.

Originally an under-19 event, the tournament format began as a single round league format. Prior to the 2019 event tournament the Chinese Football Association announced the intention to expand the format in future years to include more teams or multiple age groups. An international youth football development seminar and other events run in conjunction with the Panda Cup.

== Previous Tournaments ==
Years	Champions	Runners-up	Third-place	Fourth-place	Number of teams
2014; Details	Brazil	Croatia	China	New Zealand	4
2015; Details	Japan	Slovakia	China	Kyrgyzstan	4
2016; Details	Japan	Croatia	China	Czech Republic	4
2017; Details	Hungary	Slovakia	Iran	China	4
2018; Details	China	England	Hungary	Uruguay	4
2019; Details	~~South Korea~~ (Note: South Korea were stripped of the title by the tournament organisers on 30 May 2019, following an incident in which a South Korean player stepped on the championship trophy during the team's victory celebrations, despite the team's subsequent public apology.)	Thailand	New Zealand	China	4
2023; Details	Cancelled				4
2024; Details	Australia	Kyrgyzstan	China	Mongolia	4
2025; Details	South Korea	China	Uzbekistan	Vietnam	4
2026; Details	China	South Korea	Tajikistan	Vietnam	4
