= 2020–21 UEFA Nations League C =

Tournament details
- Dates: League phase: 3 September – 18 November 2020; Relegation play-outs: 24–29 March 2022
- Teams: 16
- Promoted: Albania; Armenia; Montenegro; Slovenia
- Relegated: Estonia; Moldova

Tournament statistics
- Matches played: 52
- Goals scored: 103 (1.98 per match)
- Attendance: 34,866 (671 per match)
- Top scorer(s): (Albania) Sokol Cikalleshi (Estonia) Rauno Sappinen (Montenegro) Stevan Jovetić (Slovenia) Haris Vučkić (4 goals each)

The 2020–21 UEFA Nations League C was the third division of the 2020–21 edition of the UEFA Nations League, the second season of the international football competition involving the men's national teams of the 55 member associations of UEFA.

== Format ==
Following a format change from the first season, League C was expanded from 15 to 16 teams. The league consisted of UEFA members ranked from 33 to 48 in the 2018–19 UEFA Nations League overall ranking, split into four groups of four. Each team played six matches within their group, using the home-and-away round-robin format on double matchdays in September, October and November 2020. The winners of each group were promoted to the 2022–23 UEFA Nations League B, and the fourth-placed team of each group advanced to the relegation play-outs.

As League C had four groups while League D had only two, the two League C teams that were to be relegated to the 2022–23 UEFA Nations League D were determined by play-outs in March 2022. Based on the Nations League overall ranking, the best-ranked team faced the fourth-ranked team, and the second-ranked team faced the third-ranked team. Two ties were played over two legs, with the higher-ranked team hosted the second leg. The team that scored more goals on aggregate over the two legs remained in League C, while the loser was relegated to League D. If the aggregate score was level, extra time was played (the away goals rule was not applied). If still tied after extra time, a penalty shoot-out was used to decide the winner. The away goals rule was originally to be used, but was abolished by the UEFA Executive Committee on 16 December 2021.

== Teams ==
=== Team changes ===
The following were the team changes of League C from the 2018–19 season:

Incoming
Promoted from Nations League D
Group winners: Belarus; Georgia; Kosovo; North Macedonia	Following format change: Armenia; Azerbaijan; Kazakhstan; Luxembourg; Moldova

Outgoing
Promoted to Nations League B
Group winners: Finland; Norway; Scotland; Serbia	Following format change: Bulgaria; Hungary; Israel; Romania

The following team changes were initially set to occur in League C, but did not after no teams were relegated due to the format change by UEFA:

Incoming
Initially relegated from
Nations League B
- Northern Ireland
- Republic of Ireland
- Slovakia
- Turkey

Outgoing
Initially relegated to
Nations League D
- Cyprus
- Estonia
- Lithuania
- Slovenia

=== Seeding ===
In the 2020–21 access list, UEFA ranked teams based on the 2018–19 Nations League overall ranking, with a slight modification: teams that were originally relegated in the previous season were ranked immediately below teams promoted prior to the format change. The seeding pots for the league phase were confirmed 4 December 2019, and were based on the access list ranking.

Pot 1
Team	Rank
Greece	33
Albania	34
Montenegro	35
Georgia	36

Pot 2
Team	Rank
North Macedonia	37
Kosovo	38
Belarus	39
Cyprus	40

Pot 3
Team	Rank
Estonia	41
Slovenia	42
Lithuania	43
Luxembourg	44

Pot 4
Team	Rank
Armenia	45
Azerbaijan	46
Kazakhstan	47
Moldova	48

The draw for the league phase took place at the Beurs van Berlage Conference Centre in Amsterdam, Netherlands on 3 March 2020, 18:00 CET. Each group contained one team from each pot.

== Groups ==
The original fixture list was confirmed by UEFA on 3 March 2020 following the draw. On 17 June 2020, the UEFA Executive Committee adjusted the league phase schedule for October and November 2020 to allow for the completion of the UEFA Euro 2020 qualifying play-offs. Following the change, a revised schedule for the October and November 2020 fixtures was released by UEFA on 26 June 2020.

Times are CET/CEST, (Note: CEST (UTC+2) for matchdays 1–4 (September and October 2020), CET (UTC+1) for matchdays 5–6 (November 2020).) as listed by UEFA (local times, if different, are in parentheses).

=== Group 1 ===
Pos	Team	Pld	W	D	L	GF	GA	GD	Pts	Promotion or qualification	(Montenegro)	(Luxembourg)	(Azerbaijan)	(Cyprus)
1	Montenegro (P)	6	4	1	1	10	2	+8	13	Promotion to League B	—	1–2	2–0	4–0
2	Luxembourg	6	3	1	2	7	5	+2	10		0–1	—	0–0	2–0
3	Azerbaijan	6	1	3	2	2	4	−2	6		0–0	1–2	—	0–0
4	Cyprus (O)	6	1	1	4	2	10	−8	4	Qualification to relegation play-outs	0–2	2–1	0–1	—

Source: UEFA
Rules for classification: Tiebreakers
(O) Play-off winners; (P) Promoted
5 September 2020
18:00 (20:00 UTC+4)

Azerbaijan	1–2	Luxembourg
Sheydayev 43'	Report	Krivotsyuk 48' (o.g.); Rodrigues 72' (pen.)

Olympic Stadium, Baku
Attendance: 0 (Note: Due to the COVID-19 pandemic in Europe, all matches scheduled for September 2020 were played behind closed doors.)
Referee: Chris Kavanagh (England)
5 September 2020
18:00 (19:00 UTC+3)

Cyprus	0–2	Montenegro
	Report	Jovetić 60', 73'

GSP Stadium, Nicosia
Attendance: 0
Referee: Harm Osmers (Germany)

8 September 2020
20:45 (21:45 UTC+3)

Cyprus	0–1	Azerbaijan
	Report	Medvedev 29'

GSP Stadium, Nicosia
Attendance: 0
Referee: Filip Glova (Slovakia)
8 September 2020
20:45

Luxembourg	0–1	Montenegro
	Report	Bećiraj 90+3' (pen.)

Stade Josy Barthel, Luxembourg City
Attendance: 0
Referee: Lawrence Visser (Belgium)

10 October 2020
15:00

Luxembourg	2–0	Cyprus
Sinani 12', 26'	Report

Stade Josy Barthel, Luxembourg City
Attendance: 1,334
Referee: Don Robertson (Scotland)
10 October 2020
15:00

Montenegro	2–0	Azerbaijan
Jovetić 9'; Ivanović 71'	Report

City Stadium, Podgorica
Attendance: 0 (Note: Due to the COVID-19 pandemic in Europe, the match was played behind closed doors.)
Referee: Ricardo de Burgos Bengoetxea (Spain)

13 October 2020
18:00

Azerbaijan	0–0	Cyprus
	Report

Elbasan Arena, Elbasan (Albania) (Note: The Azerbaijan v Cyprus match, originally scheduled to be played at Olympic Stadium, Baku, was later moved to the neutral Elbasan Arena, Elbasan, due to the Nagorno-Karabakh conflict.)
Attendance: 0
Referee: Fran Jović (Croatia)
13 October 2020
20:45

Montenegro	1–2	Luxembourg
Ivanović 34'	Report	Muratović 42'; Sinani 86'

City Stadium, Podgorica
Attendance: 0
Referee: Sascha Stegemann (Germany)

14 November 2020
18:00

Azerbaijan	0–0	Montenegro
	Report

Ivan Laljak-Ivić Stadium, Zaprešić (Croatia) (Note: The Azerbaijan v Montenegro match, originally scheduled to be played at Olympic Stadium, Baku, was later moved to the neutral Ivan Laljak-Ivić Stadium, Zaprešić, as UEFA announced on 20 October 2020 to temporarily suspend all UEFA matches taking place in Armenia and Azerbaijan until further notice due to the Nagorno-Karabakh conflict.)
Attendance: 0
Referee: Sergei Ivanov (Russia)
14 November 2020
18:00 (19:00 UTC+2)

Cyprus	2–1	Luxembourg
Kastanos 34' (pen.), 71'	Report	Kousoulos 5' (o.g.)

GSP Stadium, Nicosia
Attendance: 0
Referee: Mattias Gestranius (Finland)

17 November 2020
20:45

Luxembourg	0–0	Azerbaijan
	Report

Stade Josy Barthel, Luxembourg City
Attendance: 100
Referee: Felix Zwayer (Germany)
17 November 2020
20:45

Montenegro	4–0	Cyprus
Jovetić 14'; Boljević 25', 28'; Mugoša 60'	Report

City Stadium, Podgorica
Attendance: 0
Referee: Eitan Shemeulevitch (Israel)

=== Group 2 ===
Pos	Team	Pld	W	D	L	GF	GA	GD	Pts	Promotion or qualification	(Armenia)	(North Macedonia)	(Georgia (country))	(Estonia)
1	Armenia (P)	6	3	2	1	9	6	+3	11	Promotion to League B	—	1–0	2–2	2–0
2	North Macedonia	6	2	3	1	9	8	+1	9		2–1	—	1–1	2–1
3	Georgia	6	1	4	1	6	6	0	7		1–2	1–1	—	0–0
4	Estonia (R)	6	0	3	3	5	9	−4	3	Qualification to relegation play-outs	1–1	3–3	0–1	—

Source: UEFA
Rules for classification: Tiebreakers
(P) Promoted; (R) Relegated
5 September 2020
15:00

North Macedonia	2–1	Armenia
Alioski 5' (pen.); Nestorovski 38' (pen.)	Report	Barseghyan 90+4' (pen.)

Toše Proeski Arena, Skopje
Attendance: 0
Referee: Irfan Peljto (Bosnia and Herzegovina)
5 September 2020
18:00 (19:00 UTC+3)

Estonia	0–1	Georgia
	Report	Kacharava 32'

A. Le Coq Arena, Tallinn
Attendance: 0
Referee: Donatas Rumšas (Lithuania)

8 September 2020
18:00 (20:00 UTC+4)

Armenia	2–0	Estonia
Karapetian 43'; Wbeymar 65'	Report

Vazgen Sargsyan Republican Stadium, Yerevan
Attendance: 0
Referee: David Coote (England)
8 September 2020
18:00 (20:00 UTC+4)

Georgia	1–1	North Macedonia
Okriashvili 13' (pen.)	Report	Ristovski 33'

Boris Paichadze Dinamo Arena, Tbilisi
Attendance: 0
Referee: Peter Kjærsgaard-Andersen (Denmark)

11 October 2020
18:00

Armenia	2–2	Georgia
Bayramyan 6'; Mkhitaryan 89' (pen.)	Report	Kacharava 46'; Okriashvili 74'

City Stadium, Tychy (Poland) (Note: The Armenia v Georgia match, originally scheduled to be played at Vazgen Sargsyan Republican Stadium, Yerevan, was later moved to the neutral City Stadium, Tychy, due to the Nagorno-Karabakh conflict.)
Attendance: 0
Referee: Ivan Bebek (Croatia)
11 October 2020
18:00 (19:00 UTC+3)

Estonia	3–3	North Macedonia
Sappinen 33', 61'; Liivak 76' (pen.)	Report	Kuusk 3' (o.g.); Pandev 80'; Zajkov 88'

A. Le Coq Arena, Tallinn
Attendance: 908
Referee: Mohammed Al-Hakim (Sweden)

14 October 2020
20:45 (21:45 UTC+3)

Estonia	1–1	Armenia
Sappinen 14'	Report	K. Hovhannisyan 8'

A. Le Coq Arena, Tallinn
Attendance: 1,007
Referee: Luis Godinho (Portugal)
14 October 2020
20:45

North Macedonia	1–1	Georgia
Alioski 90+3' (pen.)	Report	Kvaratskhelia 74'

Toše Proeski Arena, Skopje
Attendance: 0
Referee: Bartosz Frankowski (Poland)

15 November 2020
15:00

North Macedonia	2–1	Estonia
Trichkovski 29'; Stojanovski 68'	Report	Sappinen 52'

Toše Proeski Arena, Skopje
Attendance: 0
Referee: Marius Avram (Romania)
15 November 2020
18:00 (21:00 UTC+4)

Georgia	1–2	Armenia
Qazaishvili 65' (pen.)	Report	Ghazaryan 33'; Adamyan 86'

Boris Paichadze Dinamo Arena, Tbilisi
Attendance: 0
Referee: Marco Guida (Italy)

18 November 2020
18:00 (19:00 UTC+2)

Armenia	1–0	North Macedonia
Hambardzumyan 55'	Report

GSP Stadium, Nicosia (Cyprus) (Note: The Armenia v North Macedonia match, originally scheduled to be played at Vazgen Sargsyan Republican Stadium, Yerevan, was later moved to a neutral GSP Stadium, Nicosia, as UEFA announced on 20 October 2020 to temporarily suspend all UEFA matches taking place in Armenia and Azerbaijan until further notice due to the Nagorno-Karabakh conflict.)
Attendance: 0
Referee: Bobby Madden (Scotland)
18 November 2020
18:00 (21:00 UTC+4)

Georgia	0–0	Estonia
	Report

Boris Paichadze Dinamo Arena, Tbilisi
Attendance: 0
Referee: Irfan Peljto (Bosnia and Herzegovina)

=== Group 3 ===
Pos	Team	Pld	W	D	L	GF	GA	GD	Pts	Promotion or qualification	(Slovenia)	(Greece)	(Kosovo)	(Moldova)
1	Slovenia (P)	6	4	2	0	8	1	+7	14	Promotion to League B	—	0–0	2–1	1–0
2	Greece	6	3	3	0	6	1	+5	12		0–0	—	0–0	2–0
3	Kosovo	6	1	2	3	4	6	−2	5		0–1	1–2	—	1–0
4	Moldova (R)	6	0	1	5	1	11	−10	1	Qualification to relegation play-outs	0–4	0–2	1–1	—

Source: UEFA
Rules for classification: Tiebreakers
(P) Promoted; (R) Relegated
3 September 2020
20:45

Moldova	1–1	Kosovo
Nicolaescu 20'	Report	Kololli 71'

Stadio Ennio Tardini, Parma (Italy) (Note: The match between Moldova and Kosovo was played on neutral venue as there were no diplomatic relations between the two countries.)
Attendance: 0
Referee: Kai Erik Steen (Norway)
3 September 2020
20:45

Slovenia	0–0	Greece
	Report

Stožice Stadium, Ljubljana
Attendance: 0
Referee: Bobby Madden (Scotland)

6 September 2020
18:00

Slovenia	1–0	Moldova
Bohar 28'	Report

Stožice Stadium, Ljubljana
Attendance: 0
Referee: Jérôme Brisard (France)
6 September 2020
20:45

Kosovo	1–2	Greece
B. Berisha 82'	Report	Limnios 2'; Siovas 51'

Fadil Vokrri Stadium, Pristina
Attendance: 0
Referee: Pavel Královec (Czech Republic)

11 October 2020
20:45 (21:45 UTC+3)

Greece	2–0	Moldova
Bakasetas 45+3' (pen.); Mantalos 50'	Report

Olympic Stadium, Athens
Attendance: 0
Referee: Dennis Higler (Netherlands)
11 October 2020
20:45

Kosovo	0–1	Slovenia
	Report	Vučkić 22'

Fadil Vokrri Stadium, Pristina
Attendance: 0
Referee: Andrew Madley (England)

14 October 2020
20:45 (21:45 UTC+3)

Greece	0–0	Kosovo
	Report

Olympic Stadium, Athens
Attendance: 0
Referee: Roi Reinshreiber (Israel)
14 October 2020
20:45 (21:45 UTC+3)

Moldova	0–4	Slovenia
	Report	Lovrić 8'; Vučkić 37' (pen.), 42', 55' (pen.)

Zimbru Stadium, Chișinău
Attendance: 0
Referee: João Pinheiro (Portugal)

15 November 2020
20:45 (21:45 UTC+2)

Moldova	0–2	Greece
	Report	Fortounis 32'; Bakasetas 41'

Zimbru Stadium, Chișinău
Attendance: 0
Referee: Fran Jović (Croatia)
15 November 2020
20:45

Slovenia	2–1	Kosovo
Kurtić 63'; Iličić 90+4' (pen.)	Report	Muriqi 58'

Stožice Stadium, Ljubljana
Attendance: 0
Referee: Bartosz Frankowski (Poland)

18 November 2020
20:45 (21:45 UTC+2)

Greece	0–0	Slovenia
	Report

Georgios Kamaras Stadium, Athens
Attendance: 0
Referee: Carlos del Cerro Grande (Spain)
18 November 2020
20:45

Kosovo	1–0	Moldova
Kastrati 31'	Report

Fadil Vokrri Stadium, Pristina
Attendance: 0
Referee: Roomer Tarajev (Estonia)

=== Group 4 ===
Pos	Team	Pld	W	D	L	GF	GA	GD	Pts	Promotion or qualification	(Albania)	(Belarus)	(Lithuania)	(Kazakhstan)
1	Albania (P)	6	3	2	1	8	4	+4	11	Promotion to League B	—	3–2	0–1	3–1
2	Belarus	6	3	1	2	10	8	+2	10		0–2	—	2–0	2–0
3	Lithuania	6	2	2	2	5	7	−2	8		0–0	2–2	—	0–2
4	Kazakhstan (O)	6	1	1	4	5	9	−4	4	Qualification to relegation play-outs	0–0	1–2	1–2	—

Source: UEFA
Rules for classification: Tiebreakers
(O) Play-off winners; (P) Promoted
4 September 2020
18:00 (19:00 UTC+3)

Lithuania	0–2	Kazakhstan
	Report	Zaynutdinov 3'; Kuat 86'

LFF Stadium, Vilnius
Attendance: 0
Referee: Rade Obrenovič (Slovenia)
4 September 2020
20:45 (21:45 UTC+3)

Belarus	0–2	Albania
	Report	Cikalleshi 23'; Bare 78'

Dinamo Stadium, Minsk
Attendance: 0
Referee: Kristoffer Karlsson (Sweden)

7 September 2020
16:00 (20:00 UTC+6)

Kazakhstan	1–2	Belarus
Aimbetov 62'	Report	Bardachow 53'; Lisakovich 86'

Central Stadium, Almaty
Attendance: 0
Referee: Giorgi Kruashvili (Georgia)
7 September 2020
20:45

Albania	0–1	Lithuania
	Report	Kazlauskas 51'

Arena Kombëtare, Tirana
Attendance: 0
Referee: Serhiy Boyko (Ukraine)

11 October 2020
15:00 (19:00 UTC+6)

Kazakhstan	0–0	Albania
	Report

Central Stadium, Almaty
Attendance: 0
Referee: Dumitru Muntean (Moldova)
11 October 2020
18:00 (19:00 UTC+3)

Lithuania	2–2	Belarus
Novikovas 7'; Laukžemis 75'	Report	Lisakovich 59' (pen.); Sachywka 66'

LFF Stadium, Vilnius
Attendance: 963
Referee: Julian Weinberger (Austria)

14 October 2020
18:00 (19:00 UTC+3)

Lithuania	0–0	Albania
	Report

LFF Stadium, Vilnius
Attendance: 696
Referee: Karim Abed (France)
14 October 2020
20:45 (21:45 UTC+3)

Belarus	2–0	Kazakhstan
Yablonskiy 36'; Yuzepchuk 90+3'	Report

Dinamo Stadium, Minsk
Attendance: 2,074
Referee: Aleksandar Stavrev (North Macedonia)

15 November 2020
18:00

Albania	3–1	Kazakhstan
Cikalleshi 16'; Ismajli 23'; Manaj 63' (pen.)	Report	Abiken 25'

Arena Kombëtare, Tirana
Attendance: 0
Referee: Xavier Estrada Fernández (Spain)
15 November 2020
18:00 (20:00 UTC+3)

Belarus	2–0	Lithuania
Yablonskiy 5'; Ebong 20'	Report

Dinamo Stadium, Minsk
Attendance: 1,985
Referee: Chris Kavanagh (England)

18 November 2020
16:00

Albania	3–2	Belarus
Cikalleshi 20', 27' (pen.); Manaj 44'	Report	Skavysh 35'; Ebong 80'

Arena Kombëtare, Tirana
Attendance: 0
Referee: Radu Petrescu (Romania)
18 November 2020
16:00 (21:00 UTC+6)

Kazakhstan	1–2	Lithuania
Aimbetov 38'	Report	Vorobjovas 40'; Novikovas 90+4'

Central Stadium, Almaty
Attendance: 0
Referee: Hüseyin Göçek (Turkey)

== Relegation play-outs ==
The fourth-placed teams of League C participated in the relegation play-outs to determine the two teams which would be relegated. The relegation play-outs were scheduled on the same dates as the 2022 FIFA World Cup qualifying play-offs. If at least one of the teams due to participate in the relegation play-outs had also qualified for the World Cup qualifying play-offs (none ultimately did), the relegation play-outs would have been cancelled, and the teams in League C ranked 47th and 48th in the Nations League overall ranking would have been automatically relegated.

The play-out ties were as follows, with the higher-ranked teams hosting the second leg:

- Team ranked first vs. team ranked fourth
- Team ranked second vs. team ranked third

Times are CET/CEST, (Note: CET (UTC+1) for the first leg matches (24–25 March 2022), and CEST (UTC+2) for the second leg matches (28–29 March 2022).) as listed by UEFA (local times, if different, are in parentheses).

=== Ranking ===
Pos	Grp	Team	Pld	W	D	L	GF	GA	GD	Pts
1	C4	Kazakhstan	6	1	1	4	5	9	−4	4
2	C1	Cyprus	6	1	1	4	2	10	−8	4
3	C2	Estonia	6	0	3	3	5	9	−4	3
4	C3	Moldova	6	0	1	5	1	11	−10	1

Source: UEFA
Rules for classification: Ranking criteria

=== Summary ===
Team 1	Agg.	Team 2	1st leg	2nd leg
Moldova	2–2 (4–5 p)	Kazakhstan	1–2	1–0 (a.e.t.)
Estonia	0–2	Cyprus	0–0	0–2

=== Matches ===
24 March 2022
18:00 (19:00 UTC+2)

Moldova	1–2	Kazakhstan
Nicolaescu 45+1'	Report	Malyi 63'; Posmac 79' (o.g.)

Zimbru Stadium, Chișinău
Attendance: 5,387
Referee: Anastasios Sidiropoulos (Greece)
29 March 2022
16:00 (20:00 UTC+6)

Kazakhstan	0–1 (a.e.t.)	Moldova
	Report	Armaș 13'
Penalties
Abiken (penalty scored); Beysebekov (penalty missed); Dosmagambetov (penalty scored); Zaynutdinov (penalty scored); Zhaksylykov (penalty scored); Zhukov (penalty scored)	5–4	(penalty scored) Caimacov; (penalty scored) Armaș; (penalty scored) Mandrîcenco; (penalty scored) Crăciun; (penalty missed) Nicolaescu; (penalty missed) Revenco

Astana Arena, Nur-Sultan
Attendance: 12,582
Referee: Ivan Kružliak (Slovakia)

2–2 on aggregate. Kazakhstan won 5–4 on penalties and remained in League C, while Moldova were relegated to League D.

24 March 2022
18:00 (19:00 UTC+2)

Estonia	0–0	Cyprus
	Report

A. Le Coq Arena, Tallinn
Attendance: 5,366
Referee: Willie Collum (Scotland)
29 March 2022
18:00 (19:00 UTC+3)

Cyprus	2–0	Estonia
Tzionis 19'; Sotiriou 51'	Report

AEK Arena – Georgios Karapatakis, Larnaca
Attendance: 2,464
Referee: Artur Soares Dias (Portugal)

Cyprus won 2–0 on aggregate and remained in League C, while Estonia were relegated to League D.

== Goalscorers ==
There were 103 goals scored in 52 matches, for an average of 1.98 goals per match.

4 goals

- (Albania national football team) Sokol Cikalleshi
- (Estonia national football team) Rauno Sappinen
- (Montenegro national football team) Stevan Jovetić
- (Slovenia national football team) Haris Vučkić

3 goals

- (Luxembourg national football team) Danel Sinani

2 goals

- (Albania national football team) Rey Manaj
- (Belarus national football team) Max Ebong
- (Belarus national football team) Vitaly Lisakovich
- (Belarus national football team) Yevgeniy Yablonskiy
- (Cyprus national football team) Grigoris Kastanos
- (Georgia national football team) Nika Kacharava
- (Georgia national football team) Tornike Okriashvili
- (Greece national football team) Anastasios Bakasetas
- (Kazakhstan national football team) Abat Aimbetov
- (Lithuania national football team) Arvydas Novikovas
- (Moldova national football team) Ion Nicolaescu
- (Montenegro national football team) Aleksandar Boljević
- (Montenegro national football team) Igor Ivanović
- (North Macedonia national football team) Ezgjan Alioski

1 goal

- (Albania national football team) Keidi Bare
- (Albania national football team) Ardian Ismajli
- (Armenia national football team) Sargis Adamyan
- (Armenia national football team) Tigran Barseghyan
- (Armenia national football team) Khoren Bayramyan
- (Armenia national football team) Gevorg Ghazaryan
- (Armenia national football team) Hovhannes Hambardzumyan
- (Armenia national football team) Kamo Hovhannisyan
- (Armenia national football team) Aleksandre Karapetian
- (Armenia national football team) Henrikh Mkhitaryan
- (Armenia national football team) Wbeymar
- (Azerbaijan national football team) Maksim Medvedev
- (Azerbaijan national football team) Ramil Sheydayev
- (Belarus national football team) Maksim Bardachow
- (Belarus national football team) Alyaksandr Sachywka
- (Belarus national football team) Maksim Skavysh
- (Belarus national football team) Roman Yuzepchuk
- (Cyprus national football team) Pieros Sotiriou
- (Cyprus national football team) Marinos Tzionis
- (Estonia national football team) Frank Liivak
- (Georgia national football team) Khvicha Kvaratskhelia
- (Georgia national football team) Valeri Qazaishvili
- (Greece national football team) Kostas Fortounis
- (Greece national football team) Dimitris Limnios
- (Greece national football team) Petros Mantalos
- (Greece national football team) Dimitris Siovas
- (Kazakhstan national football team) Aybol Abiken
- (Kazakhstan national football team) Islambek Kuat
- (Kazakhstan national football team) Serhiy Malyi
- (Kazakhstan national football team) Baktiyar Zaynutdinov
- (Kosovo national football team) Bernard Berisha
- (Kosovo national football team) Lirim Kastrati
- (Kosovo national football team) Benjamin Kololli
- (Kosovo national football team) Vedat Muriqi
- (Lithuania national football team) Donatas Kazlauskas
- (Lithuania national football team) Karolis Laukžemis
- (Lithuania national football team) Modestas Vorobjovas
- (Luxembourg national football team) Edvin Muratović
- (Luxembourg national football team) Gerson Rodrigues
- (Moldova national football team) Igor Armaș
- (Montenegro national football team) Fatos Bećiraj
- (Montenegro national football team) Stefan Mugoša
- (North Macedonia national football team) Ilija Nestorovski
- (North Macedonia national football team) Goran Pandev
- (North Macedonia national football team) Stefan Ristovski
- (North Macedonia national football team) Vlatko Stojanovski
- (North Macedonia national football team) Ivan Trichkovski
- (North Macedonia national football team) Gjoko Zajkov
- (Slovenia national football team) Damjan Bohar
- (Slovenia national football team) Josip Iličić
- (Slovenia national football team) Jasmin Kurtić
- (Slovenia national football team) Sandi Lovrić

1 own goal

- (Azerbaijan national football team) Anton Krivotsyuk (against Luxembourg)
- (Cyprus national football team) Ioannis Kousoulos (against Luxembourg)
- (Estonia national football team) Märten Kuusk (against North Macedonia)
- (Moldova national football team) Veaceslav Posmac (against Kazakhstan)

== Overall ranking ==
The 16 League C teams were ranked 33rd to 48th overall in the 2020–21 UEFA Nations League according to the following rules:

- The teams finishing first in the groups were ranked 33rd to 36th according to the results of the league phase.
- The teams finishing second in the groups were ranked 37th to 40th according to the results of the league phase.
- The teams finishing third in the groups were ranked 41st to 44th according to the results of the league phase.
- The teams finishing fourth in the groups were ranked 45th to 48th according to the results of the league phase.

Rnk	Grp	Team	Pld	W	D	L	GF	GA	GD	Pts
33	C3	Slovenia	6	4	2	0	8	1	+7	14
34	C1	Montenegro	6	4	1	1	10	2	+8	13
35	C4	Albania	6	3	2	1	8	4	+4	11
36	C2	Armenia	6	3	2	1	9	6	+3	11
37	C3	Greece	6	3	3	0	6	1	+5	12
38	C4	Belarus	6	3	1	2	10	8	+2	10
39	C1	Luxembourg	6	3	1	2	7	5	+2	10
40	C2	North Macedonia	6	2	3	1	9	8	+1	9
41	C4	Lithuania	6	2	2	2	5	7	−2	8
42	C2	Georgia	6	1	4	1	6	6	0	7
43	C1	Azerbaijan	6	1	3	2	2	4	−2	6
44	C3	Kosovo	6	1	2	3	4	6	−2	5
45	C4	Kazakhstan	6	1	1	4	5	9	−4	4
46	C1	Cyprus	6	1	1	4	2	10	−8	4
47	C2	Estonia	6	0	3	3	5	9	−4	3
48	C3	Moldova	6	0	1	5	1	11	−10	1

Source: UEFA
Rules for classification: Ranking criteria
