= Denis Horník =

Slovak footballer

Personal information
- Full name: Denis Horník
- Date of birth: 13 July 1997 (age 29)
- Place of birth: Galanta, Slovakia
- Height: 1.80 m (5 ft 11 in)
- Position: Defender

Team information
- Current team: Petržalka
- Number: 5

Youth career
- Spartak Trnava

Senior career*
Years	Team	Apps	(Gls)
2016–2018	Spartak Trnava	18	(0)
2017–2018	→ ViOn Zlaté Moravce (loan)	19	(0)
2019–2025	Petržalka	29	(4)
2020-	Galanta	?	(?)

International career
2014–2015	Slovakia U18	19	(2)
2015–2016	Slovakia U19	11	(1)
- * Club domestic league appearances and goals as of 7 January 2020

Denis Horník (born 13 July 1997) is a Slovak footballer who plays for Galanta as a defender.

== Career ==
=== Spartak Trnava ===
As youth player of its academy, Horník signed a three-and-a-half-year professional contract with Spartak Trnava in February 2016. He made his professional debut for Trnava against Zemplín Michalovce on 27 February 2016.
