= Filip Faletar =

Croatian-Austrian football player

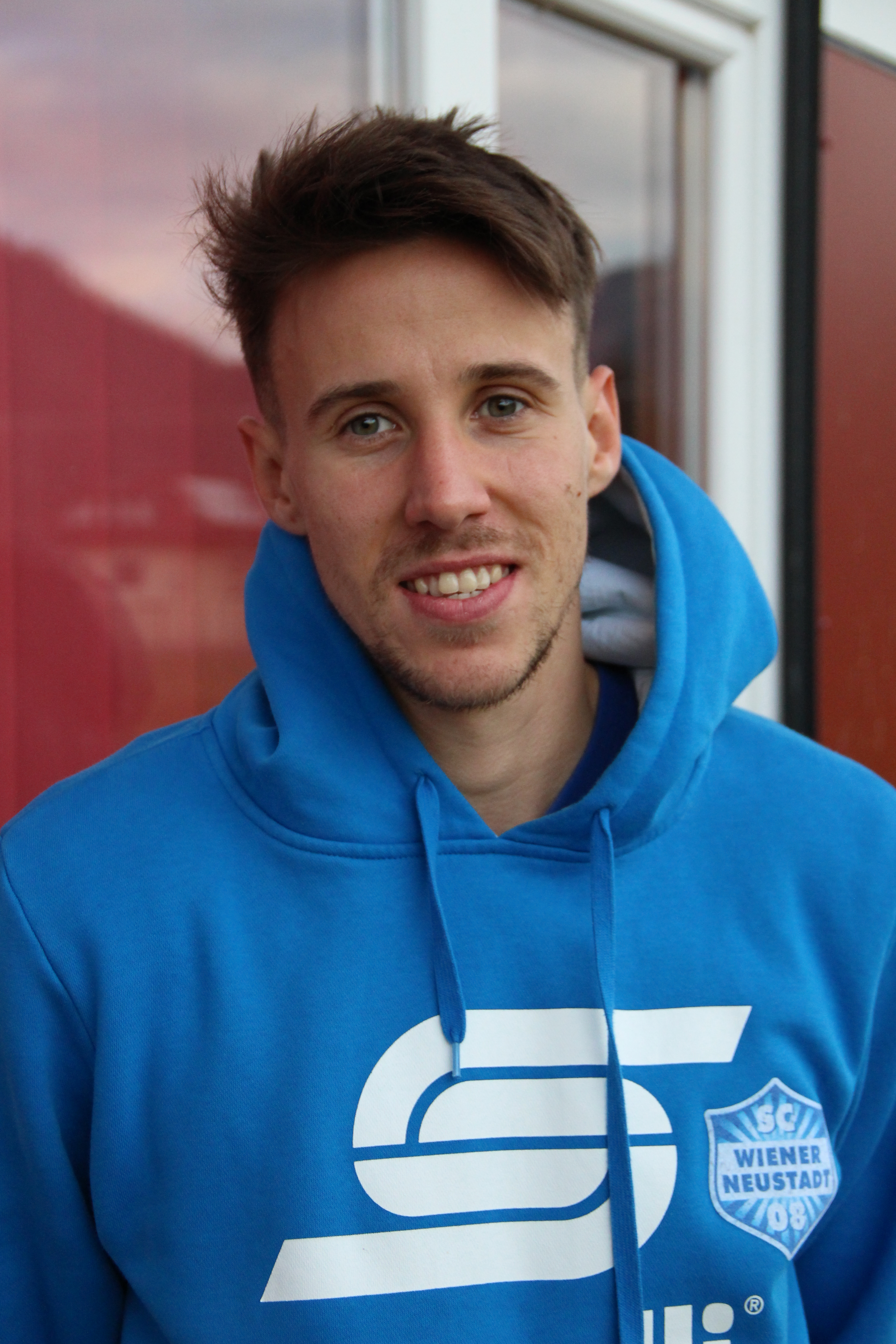
- Faletar in 2018

Personal information
- Date of birth: 2 April 1995 (age 31)
- Place of birth: Austria
- Positions: Midfielder; winger

Senior career*
Years	Team	Apps	(Gls)
2009-2014	Villarreal CF	0	(0)
2014/15-2015/16	RNK Split	2	(0)
2014/2015	NK Imotski→(loan)	13	(2)
2015/2016	NK Imotski	15	(3)
2014-2017	FC Schalke 04	0	(0)
2018-2019	SC Wiener Neustadt	30	(2)
2019-	SV Horn	23	(1)
- * Club domestic league appearances and goals

Filip Faletar (born 2 April 1995 in Austria) is an Austrian footballer.
