= Stadion Veruda =

Stadium in Pula, Croatia

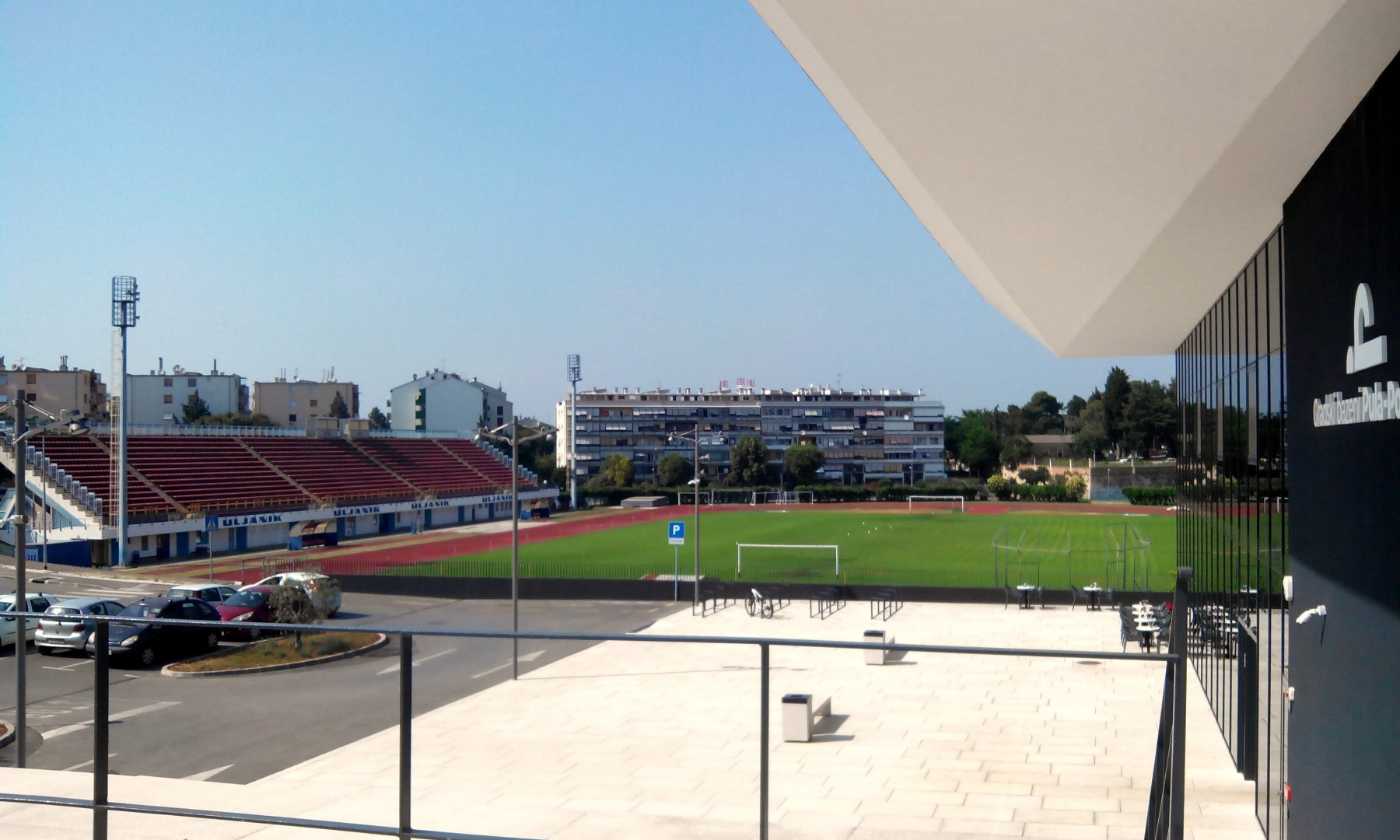
- Interactive map of Stadion Veruda
- Location: Pula, Croatia
- Coordinates: 44°51′30″N 13°50′3″E
- Capacity: 2,500

Tenants
- NK Uljanik Pula; NK Istra 1961 (until 2011)

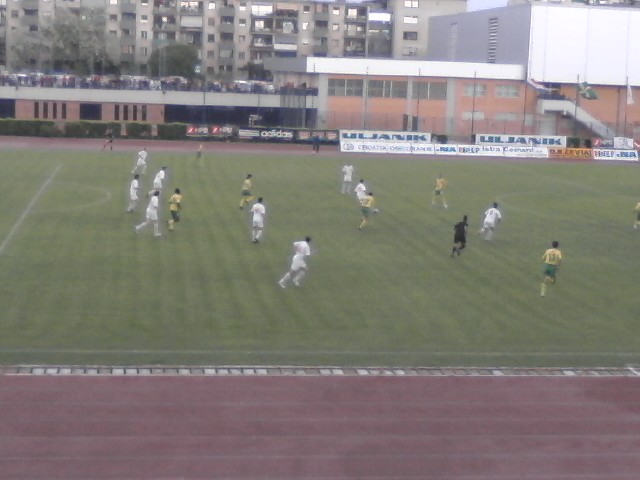
Istra 1961 in action at Stadion Veruda

Stadion Veruda is a multi-use stadium in Pula, Croatia. With a seating capacity of 2,500, it is Pula's second largest stadium. It served as the home stadium for football club NK Istra 1961 until the completed renovation of Stadion Aldo Drosina in 2011, and the current home stadium of NK Uljanik Pula.
