= Mika Mario Rokavec =

Slovenian footballer

Personal information
- Date of birth: 5 January 1997 (age 29)
- Place of birth: Maribor, Slovenia
- Height: 1.75 m (5 ft 9 in)
- Position: Midfielder

Team information
- Current team: Limbuš
- Number: 8

Youth career
- 2010–2013: GAK
- 2013–2016: Lazio

Senior career*
Years	Team	Apps	(Gls)
2017	Radomlje	8	(0)
2017–2019	Fužinar	27	(8)
2019	Rogaška	9	(0)
2019	Wolfsberger AC	14	(2)
2020–2022	Rogaška	32	(3)
2023	FC Leibnitz	0	(0)
2023–	Limbuš	3	(0)

International career
2015–2016	Slovenia U-19	6	(1)
- * Club domestic league appearances and goals as of 12 January 2024

Mika Mario Rokavec (born 5 January 1997) is a Slovenian football player.

== Club career ==
He made his Slovenian PrvaLiga debut for Radomlje on 25 February 2017 in a game against Aluminij.
