= Brian Ferrares =

Uruguayan footballer (born 2000)

Personal information
- Full name: Brian Ferrares Fernández
- Date of birth: 1 March 2000 (age 26)
- Place of birth: Montevideo, Uruguay
- Height: 1.80 m (5 ft 11 in)
- Position: Centre back

Team information
- Current team: Cerro Largo
- Number: 4

Youth career
- –2018: Danubio

Senior career*
Years	Team	Apps	(Gls)
2018–2019	Danubio	6	(0)
2020–	Cerro Largo	58	(3)
2020–2022	→ Celta B (loan)	12	(0)

International career
2017	Uruguay U17	3	(0)
- * Club domestic league appearances and goals as of 1 October 2025

Brian Ferrares Fernández (born 1 March 2000) is a Uruguayan footballer who plays as centre back for Cerro Largo.

== Club career ==
On 7 October 2020, Ferrares joined Celta B on loan.

== Career statistics ==
=== Club ===
As of match played 14 February 2021

Appearances and goals by club, season and competition
Club	Season	League			National Cup		Continental		Total	
Club	Season	Division	Apps	Goals	Apps	Goals	Apps	Goals	Apps	Goals
Danubio	2018	Uruguayan Primera División	2	0	0	0	0	0	2	0
Danubio	2019	Uruguayan Primera División	4	0	0	0	0	0	4	0
Danubio	Total		6	0	0	0	0	0	6	0
Cerro Largo	2020	Uruguayan Primera División	7	1	0	0	0	0	7	1
Celta B (loan)	2020–21	Segunda División B	12	0	—		—		12	0
Career total			25	1	0	0	0	0	25	1
