= Edvin Muratović =

Luxembourgish-Montenegrin footballer

Personal information
- Date of birth: 15 February 1997 (age 29)
- Place of birth: Dudelange, Luxembourg
- Height: 1.85 m (6 ft 1 in)
- Position: Forward

Youth career
- Jeunesse Esch
- F91 Dudelange
- –2015: Metz
- 2015–2016: 1. FC Saarbrücken
- 2016: Virton

Senior career*
Years	Team	Apps	(Gls)
2016–2018	Virton	24	(6)
2018–2022	F91 Dudelange	57	(19)
2018–2019	→ FC Differdange 03 (loan)	21	(7)
2022–2024	Racing FC	37	(13)
2024	→ Resovia (loan)	9	(3)
2024–2025	Odra Opole	29	(7)
2026	Panevėžys	16	(3)

International career^{‡}
2013	Luxembourg U17	3	(0)
2014–2015	Luxembourg U19	6	(4)
2015	Montenegro U19	2	(0)
2016–2018	Luxembourg U21	14	(3)
2020–	Luxembourg	22	(1)
- * Club domestic league appearances and goals as of 29 June 2026 (UTC) ‡ National team caps and goals as of 16:08, 6 June 2026 (UTC)

Edvin Muratović (Luxembourgish pronunciation: [ˈetvin muˈʀaːtovitʃ]; Montenegrin: Едвин Муратовић, pronounced [ědvin murǎːtovitɕ]; born 15 February 1997) is a Luxembourgish professional footballer who plays as a forward for Lithuanian A Lyga club Panevėžys and the Luxembourg national team.

== Career ==
Muratović played for the youth national teams of both Luxembourg and Montenegro. He made his senior international debut for Luxembourg on 7 October 2020 in a friendly match against Liechtenstein, which finished as a 2–1 home loss.

On 13 October 2020, he scored his first international goal, curiously, against the country of his origin, Montenegro. Luxembourg won the away game 2–1.

== Career statistics ==
=== International ===
As of match played 6 June 2026

Appearances and goals by national team and year
National team	Year	Apps	Goals
Luxembourg
Luxembourg	2020	5	1
Luxembourg	2021	5	0
Luxembourg	2022	1	0
Luxembourg	2023	2	0
Luxembourg	2024	4	0
Luxembourg	2025	4	0
Luxembourg	2026	1	0
Total		22	1

Scores and results list Luxembourg's goal tally first, score column indicates score after each Muratović goal.

List of international goals scored by Edvin Muratović
No.	Date	Venue	Opponent	Score	Result	Competition
1	13 October 2020	Podgorica City Stadium, Podgorica, Montenegro	Montenegro	1–1	2–1	2020–21 UEFA Nations League C

== Honours ==
Dudelange

- Luxembourg National Division: 2017–18, 2021–22
