= Aleksandar Georgiev =

Bulgarian footballer (born 1997)

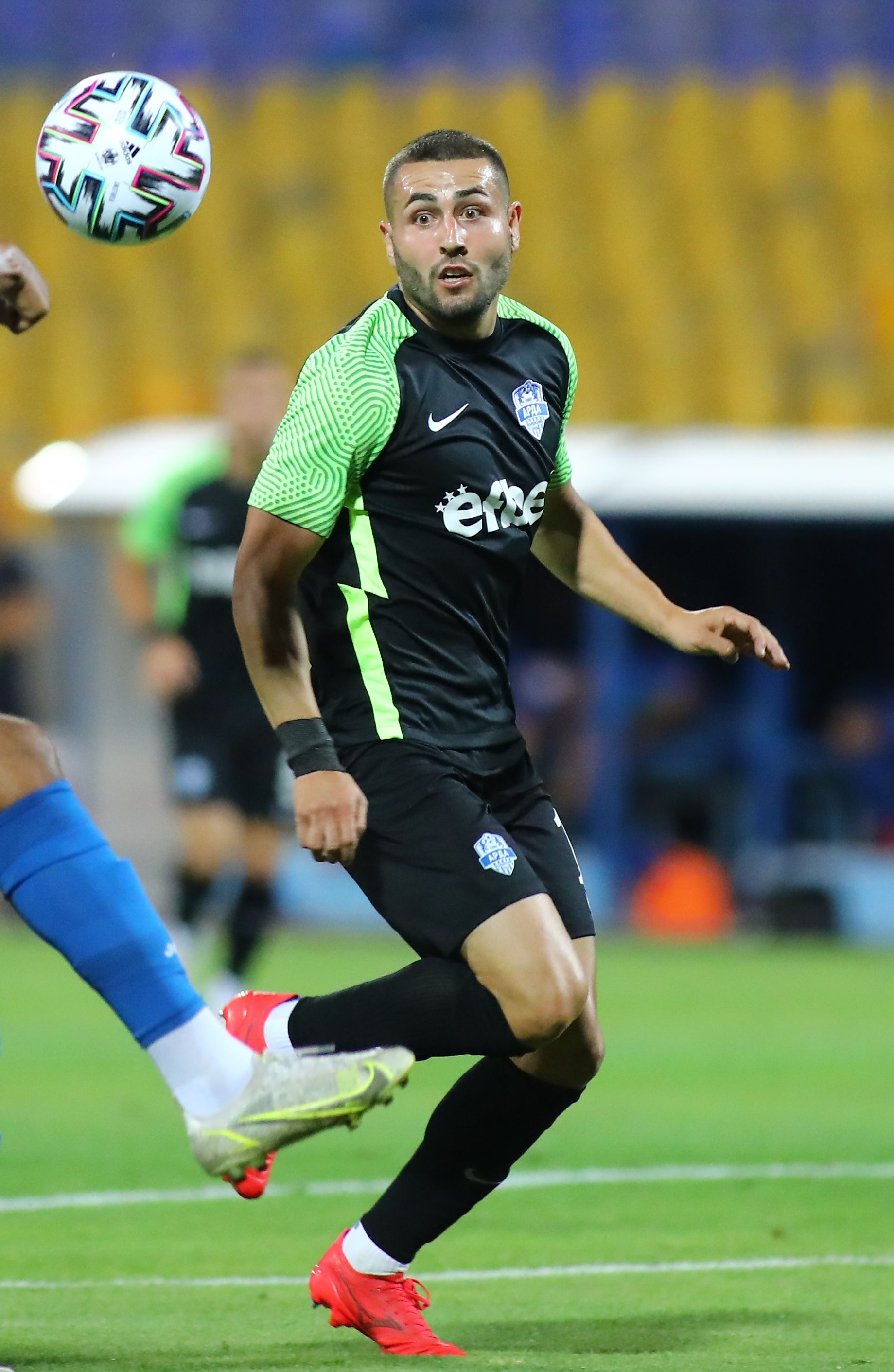

Personal information
- Full name: Aleksandar Veselinov Georgiev
- Date of birth: 10 November 1997 (age 29)
- Place of birth: Targovishte, Bulgaria
- Height: 1.76 m (5 ft 9 1/2 in)
- Positions: Left back; winger

Youth career
- –2008: Svetkavitsa Targovishte
- 2008–2009: Vilafranca
- 2009–2015: Litex Lovech

Senior career*
Years	Team	Apps	(Gls)
2015–2016	Litex Lovech II	13	(4)
2015–2016	Litex Lovech	5	(0)
2016–2017	CSKA Sofia II	15	(3)
2016–2019	CSKA Sofia	19	(1)
2018	→ Septemvri Sofia (loan)	9	(0)
2019	→ Etar (loan)	4	(0)
2019–2023	Arda Kardzhali	89	(1)
2023–2025	Krumovgrad	21	(0)
2025–2026	Spartak Varna	21	(0)
2026	Yantra Gabrovo	4	(0)

International career^{‡}
2013	Bulgaria U17	3	(0)
2014–2016	Bulgaria U19	12	(6)
2016–2018	Bulgaria U21	13	(1)
- * Club domestic league appearances and goals as of 31 October 2026 ‡ National team caps and goals as of 27 March 2018

Aleksandar Georgiev (Bulgarian: Александър Георгиев; born 10 October 1997) is a Bulgarian footballer who plays as a winger.

== Career ==
=== Early career ===
Georgiev was a youth player of hometown team Svetkavitsa Targovishte. He spent one year in Hristo Stoichkov's academy in Vilafranca football club. After that he joined Litex Lovech's academy.

=== Litex Lovech ===
Georgiev made his debut coming on as a substitute in the 42nd minute for Litex in a match against Ludogorets Razgrad won by Litex.

=== CSKA Sofia ===
On 10 June he and 15 others Litex players joined the refounded CSKA Sofia club. He began the season in the reserve team of the club, which plays in the Bulgarian Second League. He made his debut for the first team on 18 September 2016 against Cherno More Varna coming on as a substitute in the 73rd minute.

=== Krumovgrad ===
In June 2023, Georgiev signed a contract with newly promoted Krumovgrad.

=== Spartak Varna ===
In February 2025, he joined Spartak Varna.

== International career ==
On 13 May 2016 he was included in the Bulgaria U21 team for the 2016 Toulon Tournament. He scored his first goal for the U21 side on 11 October 2016 in a match against Romania U21 won by Bulgaria with 2–0.

== Career statistics ==
=== Club ===
As of 23 November 2020

Club performance			League		Cup		Continental		Other		Total	
Club	League	Season	Apps	Goals	Apps	Goals	Apps	Goals	Apps	Goals	Apps	Goals
Bulgaria			League		Bulgarian Cup		Europe		Other (Note: Includes Bulgarian Supercup matches and First League playoffs.)		Total	
Litex Lovech	A Group	2014–15	2	0	0	0	0	0	–		2	0
Litex Lovech II	B Group	2015–16	13	4	–		–		–		13	4
Litex Lovech	A Group	2015–16	3	0	3	0	2	0	–		8	0
Litex Lovech	Total		5	0	3	0	2	0	0	0	10	0
CSKA Sofia II	Second League	2016–17	15	3	–		–		–		15	3
CSKA Sofia	First League	2016–17	6	0	1	0	–		–		7	0
CSKA Sofia	First League	2017–18	13	1	1	0	–		–		14	1
CSKA Sofia	Total		19	1	2	0	0	0	0	0	21	1
Septemvri Sofia (loan)	First League	2018–19	9	0	0	0	0	0	–		9	0
Etar (loan)	First League	2018–19	4	0	0	0	0	0	–		4	0
Arda Kardzhali	First League	2019–20	18	0	2	1	–		1	0	21	1
Arda Kardzhali	First League	2020–21	5	0	1	0	–		–		6	0
Arda Kardzhali	Total		23	0	3	1	0	0	1	0	27	1
Career statistics			88	8	8	1	2	0	1	0	99	9
