= Xu Lei (footballer) =

Chinese association football player

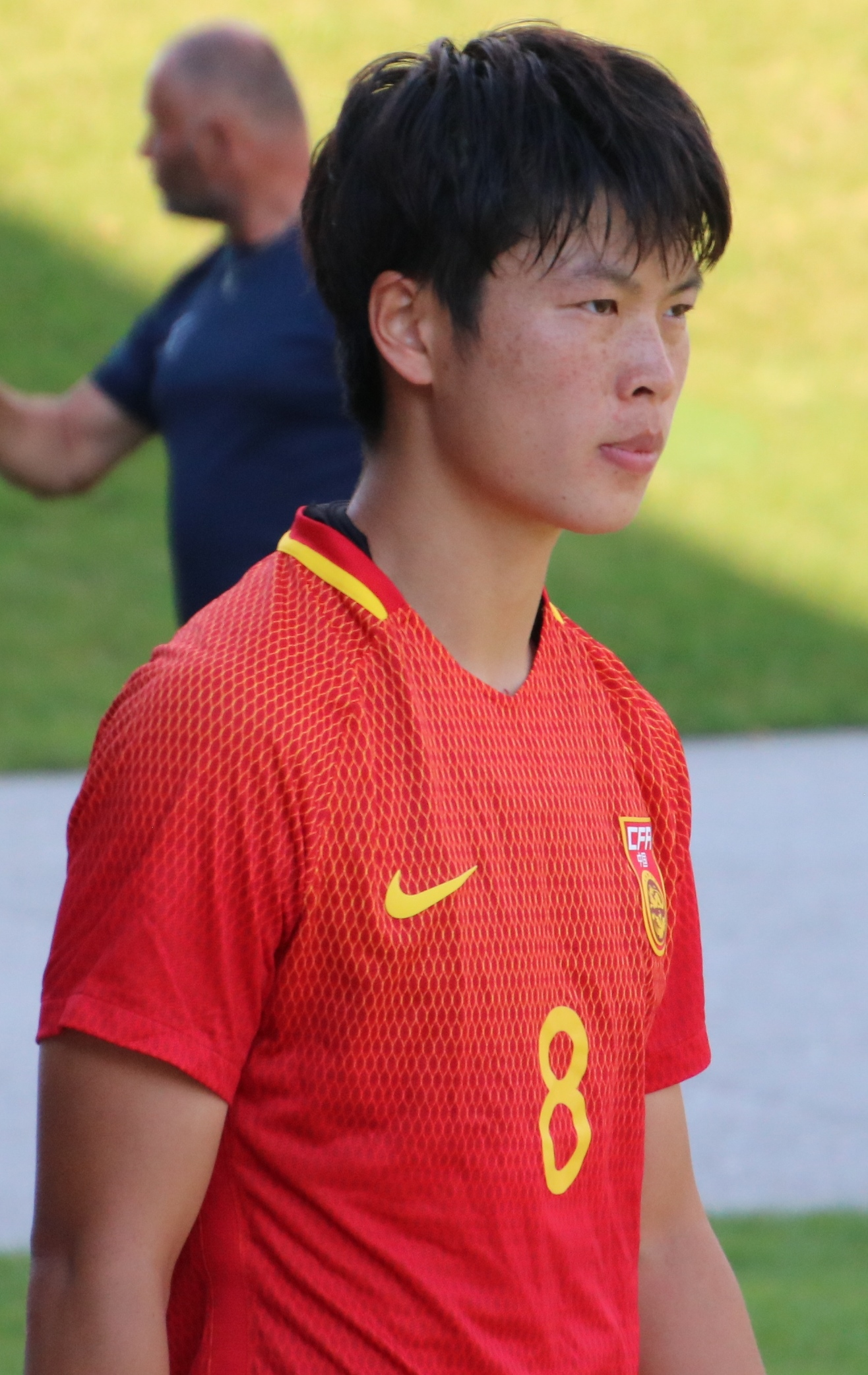

Personal information
- Date of birth: 11 January 2000 (age 26)
- Place of birth: Wuhu, Anhui
- Height: 1.78 m (5 ft 10 in)
- Position: Midfielder

Team information
- Current team: Shanghai Second

Youth career
- –2018: Genbao Football Base
- 2018–2020: Shanghai Shenhua

Senior career*
Years	Team	Apps	(Gls)
2020–2021	Shanghai Shenhua	0	(0)
2020	→ Inner Mongolia Zhongyou (loan)	10	(0)
2021	→ Meizhou Hakka (loan)	16	(0)
2022	Meizhou Hakka	3	(0)
2023	Dongguan United	5	(0)
2023–2024	Hunan Billows	12	(0)
2024	Shenzhen Shengqing	4	(0)
2024–2025	Shanxi TYUT Changsheng	6	(0)
2025–2026	Jiangxi Lushan	22	(1)
2026–	Shanghai Second	0	(0)

International career^{‡}
2018	China U19	8	(1)
2019	China U20	2	(0)
- * Club domestic league appearances and goals as of 17:43, 8 March 2026 (UTC) ‡ National team caps and goals as of 14:01, 26 July 2021 (UTC)

Xu Lei (Chinese: 徐磊; born 11 January 2000) is a Chinese footballer who plays as a midfielder for China League Two club Shanghai Second.

== Club career ==
Xu Lei would play for the Shanghai Shenhua youth team before being loaned out to second-tier club Inner Mongolia Zhongyou on 30 July 2020. He would make his debut on 13 September 2020, in a league game against Beijing Sport University that ended in a 1–0 defeat. The following season he was loaned out again to another second-tier club in Meizhou Hakka on 14 April 2021. He would make his debut on 25 April 2021, in a league game against Xinjiang Tianshan Leopard that ended in a 2–1 victory. He would be part of the squad that gained promotion to the top tier after coming second within the division at the end of the 2021 China League One campaign.

== Career statistics ==
As of 31 December 2022.

Club	Season	League			Cup		Continental		Other		Total	
Club	Season	Division	Apps	Goals	Apps	Goals	Apps	Goals	Apps	Goals	Apps	Goals
Shanghai Shenhua	2020	Chinese Super League	0	0	0	0	–		0	0	0	0
Shanghai Shenhua	2021	Chinese Super League	0	0	0	0	–		0	0	0	0
Shanghai Shenhua	Ttotal		0	0	0	0	0	0	0	0	0	0
Inner Mongolia Zhongyou (loan)	2020	China League One	10	0	0	0	–		0	0	10	0
Meizhou Hakka (loan)	2021	China League One	16	0	0	0	–		0	0	16	0
Meizhou Hakka	2022	Chinese Super League	3	0	1	0	–		0	0	4	0
Career total			29	0	1	0	0	0	0	0	30	0
