= Adrián Kopičár =

Slovak footballer

Personal information
- Full name: Adrián Kopičár
- Date of birth: 13 January 1997 (age 29)
- Place of birth: Čadca, Slovakia
- Height: 1.83 m (6 ft 0 in)
- Position: Midfielder

Team information
- Current team: Púchov
- Number: 13

Youth career
- –2010: FK Tatran Turzovka
- 2010: → Čadca (loan)
- 2011–2014: Žilina

Senior career*
Years	Team	Apps	(Gls)
2014–2016	Žilina B	17	(1)
2016	Slovan Bratislava B	15	(3)
2016	Slovan Bratislava	1	(0)
2016–2017	Senica	18	(1)
2017–2018	Podbrezová B	15	(0)
2017–2018	Podbrezová	15	(0)
2019	Šamorín	11	(1)
2019–2021	Blansko	34	(4)
2021–2022	Púchov	16	(1)
2022	Viktoria Žižkov	11	(2)
2022–	Púchov	96	(20)

International career
- Slovakia U–15
- Slovakia U–16
2013	Slovakia U–17	3	(0)
- Slovakia U–18
2015–2016	Slovakia U–19	6	(1)
- * Club domestic league appearances and goals as of 25 May 2026

Adrián Kopičár (born 13 January 1997) is a Slovak footballer who plays for Púchov as a midfielder.

== Club career ==
=== ŠK Slovan Bratislava ===
Kopičár made his professional debut for Slovan Bratislava against FO ŽP Šport Podbrezová on 20 May 2016, as a substitute in the 65th minute of the match.
