= Petar Pavlović (footballer, born 1997) =

Austrian footballer

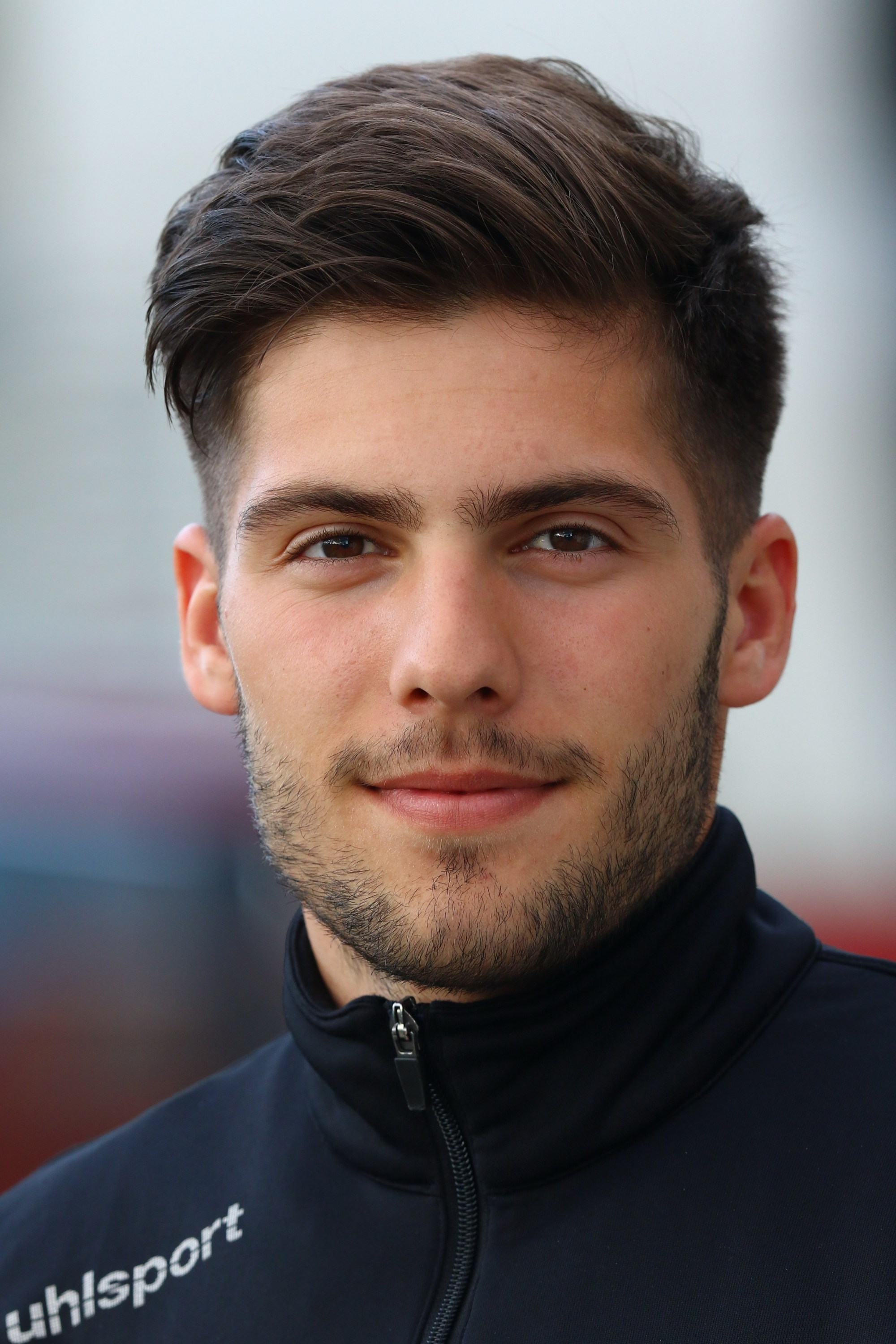

Personal information
- Date of birth: 28 July 1997 (age 29)
- Height: 1.74 m (5 ft 8 1/2 in)
- Position: Forward

Youth career
- FC Frastanz
- FC Teufen
- –2017: St. Gallen

Senior career*
Years	Team	Apps	(Gls)
2015–2016	St. Gallen	23	(5)
2016–2017	St. Gallen U21	23	(8)
2017–2019	Austria Lustenau	18	(2)
2019–2020	Gossau	12	(0)
2020–2022	Brühl	45	(7)

International career
2015	Austria U-19	3	(1)
- * Club domestic league appearances and goals

Petar Pavlović (born 28 July 1997) is an Austrian former football player.

== Club career ==
He made his Austrian Football First League debut for SC Austria Lustenau on 12 September 2017 in a game against Floridsdorfer AC and scored on his debut.

He retired from playing football at the end of the 2021–22 season at the age of 25 to attend medical school.
