= Tomáš Šalata =

Slovak footballer

Personal information
- Date of birth: 8 February 1997 (age 29)
- Place of birth: Šaľa, Slovakia
- Height: 1.93 m (6 ft 4 in)
- Position: Centre-back

Team information
- Current team: Wieselburg
- Number: 15

Youth career
- Šaľa
- Trenčín

Senior career*
Years	Team	Apps	(Gls)
2014–2018	Trenčín	3	(0)
2016–2017	→ Inter Bratislava (loan)		
2018	→ Inter Bratislava (loan)	11	(0)
2018–2019	Inter Bratislava	29	(2)
2019–2020	Mauerwerk	18	(0)
2020	Senica	6	(0)
2021	Rohrbach/Gölsen		
2022–	Wieselburg	23	(1)
- * Club domestic league appearances and goals as of 20:17, 9 March 2023 (UTC)

Tomáš Šalata (born 8 February 1997) is a Slovak footballer who last played for SC Wieselburg as a centre-back.

== Club career ==
=== AS Trenčín ===
Šalata made his professional debut for AS Trenčín against FK Železiarne Podbrezová on August 12, 2017.
