= 2013 UEFA European Under-19 Championship squads =

Player listings in youth football competition

This article displays the squads for the 2013 UEFA European Under-19 Championship. Only players born on or after 1 January 1994 were eligible to play.

Every team had to submit a list of 18 players. Two of them had to be goalkeepers.

Players in boldface have been capped at full international level since the tournament.

Age, caps and goals are as of the start of the tournament, 20 July 2013.

== Group A ==
=== Lithuania ===
Head coach: Antanas Vingilys

No.	Pos.	Player	Date of birth (age)	Caps	Goals	Club
1	GK	**Tomas Švedkauskas**	22 June 1994 (aged 19)	6	0	(Italian Football Federation) Roma
2	DF	Džiugas Petrauskas	21 March 1994 (aged 19)	1	0	(Lithuanian Football Federation) Baltija
3	DF	Julius Aleksandravičius	13 January 1995 (aged 18)	1	0	(Lithuanian Football Federation) Lietava
4	DF	Lukas Artimavičius	12 August 1994 (aged 18)	1	1	(Lithuanian Football Federation) Atlantas
5	DF	Lukas Čerkauskas	12 March 1994 (aged 19)	1	0	(Lithuanian Football Federation) Ekranas
6	MF	**Rolandas Baravykas**	23 August 1995 (aged 17)	1	0	(Lithuanian Football Federation) Atlantas
7	MF	**Deimantas Petravičius**	2 September 1995 (aged 17)	1	0	(The Football Association) Nottingham Forest
8	FW	Klaudijus Upstas	30 October 1994 (aged 18)	0	0	(Lithuanian Football Federation) Tauras Tauragė
9	MF	Lukas Narbutas	10 May 1994 (aged 19)	1	0	(Lithuanian Football Federation) Ekranas
10	FW	**Simonas Stankevičius**	13 June 1995 (aged 18)	4	1	(The Football Association) Leicester City
11	FW	**Donatas Kazlauskas**	3 October 1995 (aged 17)	12	3	(Lithuanian Football Federation) Atlantas
12	GK	**Edvinas Gertmonas**	1 June 1996 (aged 17)	0	0	(Lithuanian Football Federation) Tauras Tauragė
13	FW	**Lukas Spalvis**	27 July 1994 (aged 18)	3	0	(Danish Football Association) AaB
14	MF	**Vykintas Slivka**	29 April 1995 (aged 18)	1	0	(Lithuanian Football Federation) Ekranas
15	DF	Justinas Januševskis	26 March 1994 (aged 19)	1	0	(Lithuanian Football Federation) Trakai
17	MF	**Gratas Sirgedas**	17 December 1994 (aged 18)	7	1	(Lithuanian Football Federation) Ekranas
19	MF	Gabrielius Judickas	4 July 1995 (aged 18)	0	0	(Italian Football Federation) Novara
20	DF	Klaidas Jaškus	22 April 1994 (aged 19)	0	0	(Lithuanian Football Federation) Atletas Kaunas

=== Netherlands ===
Head coach: Wim van Zwam

No.	Pos.	Player	Date of birth (age)	Caps	Goals	Club
1	GK	Mickey van der Hart	13 June 1994 (aged 19)	5	0	(Royal Dutch Football Association) Ajax
2	DF	**Kenny Tete**	9 October 1995 (aged 17)	2	0	(Royal Dutch Football Association) Ajax
3	DF	Sven van Beek	28 July 1994 (aged 18)	7	0	(Royal Dutch Football Association) Feyenoord
4	DF	**Terence Kongolo**	14 February 1994 (aged 19)	9	0	(Royal Dutch Football Association) Feyenoord
5	DF	Lucas Woudenberg	25 April 1994 (aged 19)	8	0	(Royal Dutch Football Association) Feyenoord
6	MF	Michael Chacón	11 April 1994 (aged 19)	5	0	(Royal Dutch Football Association) Heerenveen
7	MF	Bilal Başaçıkoğlu	26 March 1995 (aged 18)	2	0	(Royal Dutch Football Association) Heerenveen
8	MF	Yassine Ayoub	6 March 1994 (aged 19)	6	0	(Royal Dutch Football Association) Utrecht
9	FW	Anass Achahbar	13 January 1994 (aged 19)	17	11	(Royal Dutch Football Association) Feyenoord
10	MF	**Mimoun Mahi**	13 March 1994 (aged 19)	7	0	(Royal Dutch Football Association) Sparta Rotterdam
11	MF	Brahim Darri	14 September 1994 (aged 18)	9	1	(Royal Dutch Football Association) Vitesse
12	FW	**Danzell Gravenberch**	13 February 1994 (aged 19)	4	0	(Royal Dutch Football Association) Ajax
13	DF	**Wesley Hoedt**	6 March 1994 (aged 19)	0	0	(Royal Dutch Football Association) AZ
14	MF	Huseyin Dogan	22 January 1994 (aged 19)	7	0	(Royal Dutch Football Association) Sparta Rotterdam
15	MF	Clint Leemans	15 September 1995 (aged 17)	0	0	(Royal Dutch Football Association) PSV
16	GK	Nick Olij	1 August 1995 (aged 17)	0	0	(Royal Dutch Football Association) AZ
17	FW	Rai Vloet	8 May 1995 (aged 18)	2	2	(Royal Dutch Football Association) PSV
18	FW	Roy Talsma	31 August 1994 (aged 18)	2	0	(Royal Dutch Football Association) Vitesse

=== Spain ===
Head coach: Luis de la Fuente

No.	Pos.	Player	Date of birth (age)	Caps	Goals	Club
1	GK	Alfonso Herrero	21 April 1994 (aged 19)	3	0	(Royal Spanish Football Federation) Real Madrid
2	DF	**Héctor Bellerín**	10 March 1995 (aged 18)	4	0	(The Football Association) Arsenal
3	DF	**José Gayà**	25 May 1995 (aged 18)	2	0	(Royal Spanish Football Federation) Valencia
4	DF	Pablo Íñiguez	20 January 1994 (aged 19)	5	0	(Royal Spanish Football Federation) Villarreal
5	DF	Borja López	2 February 1994 (aged 19)	6	0	(Royal Spanish Football Federation) Sporting Gijón
6	MF	José Rodríguez	16 December 1994 (aged 18)	6	0	(Royal Spanish Football Federation) Real Madrid
7	MF	Álvaro Vadillo	12 September 1994 (aged 18)	5	0	(Royal Spanish Football Federation) Real Betis
8	MF	Álex Serrano	6 February 1995 (aged 18)	3	1	(Royal Spanish Football Federation) Sporting Gijón
9	FW	Iker Hernández	8 April 1994 (aged 19)	5	2	(Royal Spanish Football Federation) Real Sociedad
10	MF	Fede Vico	4 July 1994 (aged 19)	6	2	(Royal Belgian Football Association) Anderlecht
11	MF	Moi Gómez	20 October 1994 (aged 18)	6	1	(Royal Spanish Football Federation) Villarreal
12	FW	Sandro Ramírez	9 July 1995 (aged 18)	2	1	(Royal Spanish Football Federation) Barcelona
13	GK	Rubén Blanco	25 July 1995 (aged 17)	5	0	(Royal Spanish Football Federation) Celta Vigo
14	MF	Lucas Torró	5 July 1994 (aged 19)	1	0	(Royal Spanish Football Federation) Real Madrid
15	DF	Julio Rodríguez	7 December 1995 (aged 17)	1	0	(Royal Spanish Football Federation) Sporting Gijón
16	DF	Rubén Duarte	18 October 1995 (aged 17)	4	0	(Royal Spanish Football Federation) Espanyol
17	FW	**Adama Traoré**	25 January 1996 (aged 17)	4	0	(Royal Spanish Football Federation) Barcelona
18	DF	Jaime Sánchez	11 March 1995 (aged 18)	5	0	(Royal Spanish Football Federation) Real Madrid

=== Portugal ===
Head coach: Emílio Peixe

Emílio Peixe named his final 18-man squad on 5 July 2013. On 14 July, Rui Silva replaced José Costa.

No.	Pos.	Player	Date of birth (age)	Caps	Goals	Club
1	GK	**Bruno Varela**	4 November 1994 (aged 18)	7	0	(Portuguese Football Federation) Benfica
2	DF	**João Cancelo**	27 May 1994 (aged 19)	21	1	(Portuguese Football Federation) Benfica
3	DF	Tobias Figueiredo	2 February 1994 (aged 19)	6	0	(Portuguese Football Federation) Sporting CP
4	DF	**Rudinilson Silva**	20 August 1994 (aged 18)	14	0	(Portuguese Football Federation) Benfica
5	DF	Rafa Soares	9 May 1995 (aged 18)	11		(Portuguese Football Federation) Porto
6	MF	João Teixeira	6 February 1994 (aged 19)	14	2	(Portuguese Football Federation) Benfica
7	FW	**Carlos Mané**	11 March 1994 (aged 19)	13	3	(Portuguese Football Federation) Sporting CP
8	DF	Leandro Silva	4 May 1994 (aged 19)	13	1	(Portuguese Football Federation) Porto
9	MF	**Ricardo Horta**	15 September 1994 (aged 18)	13		(Portuguese Football Federation) Vitória de Setúbal
10	MF	**Bernardo Silva**	10 August 1994 (aged 18)	9	1	(Portuguese Football Federation) Benfica
11	FW	**Hélder Costa**	12 January 1994 (aged 19)	8	4	(Portuguese Football Federation) Benfica
12	GK	**Rui Silva**	7 February 1994 (aged 19)	3	0	(Portuguese Football Federation) Nacional
13	DF	**Edgar Ié**	1 May 1994 (aged 19)	5	1	(Royal Spanish Football Federation) Barcelona
14	DF	Fábio Cardoso	19 April 1994 (aged 19)	6	0	(Portuguese Football Federation) Benfica
15	DF	Pedro Rebocho	23 January 1995 (aged 18)	14	0	(Portuguese Football Federation) Benfica
16	MF	Tomás Podstawski	30 January 1995 (aged 18)	15	0	(Portuguese Football Federation) Porto
17	MF	**Marcos Lopes**	12 December 1995 (aged 17)	9	7	(The Football Association) Manchester City
18	FW	Alexandre Guedes	11 February 1994 (aged 19)	0	0	(Portuguese Football Federation) Sporting CP

== Group B ==
=== Serbia ===
Head coach: Ljubinko Drulović

No.	Pos.	Player	Date of birth (age)	Caps	Goals	Club
1	GK	**Predrag Rajković**	31 October 1995 (aged 17)	3	0	(Football Association of Serbia) Jagodina
2	DF	Petar Golubović	13 July 1994 (aged 19)	1	0	(Football Association of Serbia) OFK Beograd
3	DF	**Slobodan Urošević**	15 April 1994 (aged 19)	1	0	(Football Association of Serbia) Rad
4	MF	**Sergej Milinković-Savić**	27 February 1995 (aged 18)	1	0	(Football Association of Serbia) Vojvodina
5	DF	Nikola Antić	4 January 1994 (aged 19)	1	1	(Football Association of Serbia) Rad
6	DF	Aleksandar Filipović	20 December 1994 (aged 18)	1	0	(Football Association of Serbia) Jagodina
7	FW	**Ognjen Ožegović**	9 June 1994 (aged 19)	1	0	(Football Association of Serbia) Red Star Belgrade
8	MF	Dejan Meleg	20 January 1994 (aged 19)	0	0	(Royal Dutch Football Association) Ajax
9	FW	**Uroš Đurđević**	2 March 1994 (aged 19)	3	2	(Football Association of Serbia) Rad
10	MF	Marko Pavlovski	7 February 1994 (aged 19)	6	0	(Football Association of Serbia) OFK Beograd
11	MF	Andrija Luković	24 October 1994 (aged 18)	5	1	(Football Association of Serbia) Rad
12	GK	Stefan Čupić	7 May 1994 (aged 19)	2	0	(Football Association of Serbia) OFK Beograd
13	MF	**Mijat Gaćinović**	8 February 1995 (aged 18)	0	0	(Football Association of Serbia) Vojvodina
14	FW	**Aleksandar Mitrović**	16 September 1994 (aged 18)	5	2	(Football Association of Serbia) Partizan
15	DF	**Miloš Veljković**	26 September 1995 (aged 17)	3	0	(The Football Association) Tottenham Hotspur
16	MF	Milan Vojvodić	20 January 1994 (aged 19)	0	0	(Football Association of Serbia) Spartak Zlatibor Voda
17	FW	Aleksandar Čavrić	29 January 1994 (aged 19)	5	0	(Football Association of Serbia) OFK Beograd
18	MF	**Nemanja Maksimović**	26 March 1995 (aged 18)	1	0	Free agent

=== Turkey ===
Head coach: Okan Buruk

No.	Pos.	Player	Date of birth (age)	Caps	Goals	Club
1	GK	Onurcan Piri	28 September 1994 (aged 18)	2	0	(Turkish Football Federation) Giresunspor
2	DF	Serdar Yazıcı	21 April 1994 (aged 19)	12	0	(Turkish Football Federation) Eskişehirspor
3	DF	İlkay Durmuş	1 May 1994 (aged 19)	9	0	(Turkish Football Federation) Gençlerbirliği
4	DF	Hakan Çinemre	14 February 1994 (aged 19)	2	0	(Turkish Football Federation) Fenerbahçe
5	DF	**Ahmet Yılmaz Çalık**	26 February 1994 (aged 19)	16	2	(Turkish Football Federation) Gençlerbirliği
6	MF	**Salih Uçan**	6 January 1994 (aged 19)	9	0	(Turkish Football Federation) Fenerbahçe
7	MF	Cenk Şahin	22 September 1994 (aged 18)	20	3	(Turkish Football Federation) İstanbul BB
8	MF	**Okay Yokuşlu**	9 March 1994 (aged 19)	11	2	(Turkish Football Federation) Kayserispor
9	FW	İbrahim Yılmaz	6 February 1994 (aged 19)	15	5	(Turkish Football Federation) İstanbul BB
10	FW	Recep Niyaz	1 January 1995 (aged 18)	9	3	(Turkish Football Federation) Fenerbahçe
11	FW	Okan Aydın	8 May 1994 (aged 19)	8	1	(German Football Association) Bayer Leverkusen
12	GK	Cantuğ Temel	10 June 1994 (aged 19)	0	0	(Turkish Football Federation) Orduspor
13	MF	İsmail Güven	16 April 1994 (aged 19)	1	0	(Turkish Football Federation) Torku Konyaspor
14	DF	Süheyl Çetin	22 June 1995 (aged 18)	1	0	(Turkish Football Federation) Bursaspor
15	DF	**Ozan Tufan**	23 March 1995 (aged 18)	3	0	(Turkish Football Federation) Bursaspor
16	FW	Okan Deniz	20 May 1994 (aged 19)	2	0	(Turkish Football Federation) Bursaspor
17	MF	İbrahim Coşkun	3 March 1995 (aged 18)	6	0	(French Football Federation) Auxerre
18	FW	Sinan Bakış	22 April 1994 (aged 19)	4	0	(German Football Association) Bayer Leverkusen

=== Georgia ===
Head coach: Giorgi Tsetsadze

No.	Pos.	Player	Date of birth (age)	Caps	Goals	Club
1	GK	Gabriel Tebidze	10 November 1994 (aged 18)	3	0	(Georgian Football Federation) Metalurgi Rustavi
2	DF	Davit Mtivlishvili	26 October 1994 (aged 18)	3	0	(Georgian Football Federation) Torpedo Kutaisi
3	DF	**Lasha Dvali**	14 May 1995 (aged 18)	3	0	(Latvian Football Federation) Skonto
4	DF	Nika Sandokhadze	20 February 1994 (aged 19)	5	0	(Georgian Football Federation) Torpedo Kutaisi
5	DF	Levan Gegetchkori	5 June 1994 (aged 19)	5	0	(Georgian Football Federation) Merani Martvili
6	MF	Davit Ubilava	27 January 1994 (aged 19)	2	0	(Georgian Football Federation) Torpedo Kutaisi
7	MF	Guram Samushia	5 September 1994 (aged 18)	5	1	(Georgian Football Federation) Zestaponi
8	MF	Avto Endeladze	17 September 1994 (aged 18)	3	0	(Georgian Football Federation) Zestaponi
9	FW	Teimuraz Markozashvili	21 April 1994 (aged 19)	5	0	(Georgian Football Federation) Torpedo Kutaisi
10	FW	**Bachana Arabuli**	5 January 1994 (aged 19)	15	4	(Georgian Football Federation) Dila Gori
11	FW	**Nika Kacharava**	13 January 1994 (aged 19)	5	0	(Russian Football Union) Rubin Kazan
12	GK	Bacho Mikava	12 January 1994 (aged 19)	1	0	(Georgian Football Federation) Torpedo Kutaisi
13	DF	Nika Tchanturia	19 January 1995 (aged 18)	3	0	(Georgian Football Federation) Torpedo Kutaisi
14	FW	Giorgi Pantsulaia	6 January 1994 (aged 19)	7	2	(Georgian Football Federation) Torpedo Kutaisi
15	MF	Dachi Tsnobiladze	28 January 1994 (aged 19)	2	0	(Georgian Football Federation) Metalurgi Rustavi
16	DF	Aleksandre Gureshidze	23 April 1995 (aged 18)	1	0	(Georgian Football Federation) Dinamo Tbilisi
17	FW	**Budu Zivzivadze**	10 March 1994 (aged 19)	1	0	(Georgian Football Federation) Dinamo Tbilisi
18	FW	**Luka Zarandia**	17 February 1996 (aged 17)	2	0	(Georgian Football Federation) Torpedo Kutaisi

=== France ===
Head coach: Francis Smerecki

No.	Pos.	Player	Date of birth (age)	Caps	Goals	Club
1	GK	Quentin Beunardeau	27 February 1994 (aged 19)	11	0	(French Football Federation) Le Mans
2	DF	**Jordan Ikoko**	3 February 1994 (aged 19)	9	0	(French Football Federation) Paris Saint-Germain
3	DF	**Benjamin Mendy**	17 July 1994 (aged 19)	12	0	(French Football Federation) Marseille
4	DF	**Antoine Conte**	29 January 1994 (aged 19)	7	1	(French Football Federation) Paris Saint-Germain
5	DF	Lucas Rougeaux	10 March 1994 (aged 19)	10	2	(French Football Federation) Nice
6	MF	**Larry Azouni**	23 March 1994 (aged 19)	11	0	(French Football Federation) Marseille
7	MF	**Kévin Rodrigues**	5 March 1994 (aged 19)	3	1	(French Football Federation) Toulouse
8	MF	Adrien Hunou	19 January 1994 (aged 19)	12	3	(French Football Federation) Rennes
9	FW	**Yassine Benzia**	8 September 1994 (aged 18)	13	6	(French Football Federation) Lyon
10	FW	**Lenny Nangis**	24 March 1994 (aged 19)	12	1	(French Football Federation) Caen
11	MF	**Adrien Rabiot**	3 April 1995 (aged 18)	11	2	(French Football Federation) Paris Saint-Germain
12	DF	**Steven Moreira**	13 August 1994 (aged 18)	5	0	(French Football Federation) Rennes
13	DF	**Aymeric Laporte**	27 May 1994 (aged 19)	9	1	(Royal Spanish Football Federation) Athletic Bilbao
14	FW	**Anthony Martial**	5 December 1995 (aged 17)	2	0	(French Football Federation) Monaco
15	DF	**Jean-Philippe Gbamin**	25 May 1995 (aged 18)	1	0	(French Football Federation) Lens
16	GK	**Mouez Hassen**	5 March 1995 (aged 18)	0	0	(French Football Federation) Nice
17	FW	Corentin Jean	15 July 1995 (aged 18)	0	0	(French Football Federation) Troyes
18	FW	**Opa Nguette**	8 July 1994 (aged 19)	7	1	(French Football Federation) Valenciennes

== Player representation ==
=== By club ===
Players	Clubs
8	(Portugal) Benfica, (Georgia (country)) Torpedo Kutaisi
4	(Netherlands) Ajax, (Netherlands) Feyenoord, (Lithuania) Ekranas, (Serbia) OFK Beograd, (Serbia) Rad, (Spain) Real Madrid
3	(Spain) Barcelona, (Turkey) Bursaspor, (Turkey) Fenerbahçe, (Lithuania) Atlantas, (France) Paris Saint-Germain, (Portugal) Porto, (Portugal) Sporting CP, (Spain) Sporting Gijón
2	(Netherlands) AZ, (Germany) Bayer Leverkusen, (Georgia (country)) Dinamo Tbilisi, (Georgia (country)) Metalurgi Rustavi, (Georgia (country)) Zestaponi, (Lithuania) Tauras Tauragė, (Turkey) Gençlerbirliği, (Turkey) İstanbul BB, (Serbia) Jagodina, (Netherlands) PSV, (France) Marseille, (Netherlands) Heerenveen, (Netherlands) Sparta Rotterdam, (France) Rennes, (Spain) Villarreal, (Netherlands) Vitesse, (Serbia) Vojvodina
1	(Denmark) AaB, (France) Auxerre, (Belgium) Anderlecht, (England) Arsenal, (France) Monaco, (Italy) Roma, (Spain) Athletic Bilbao, (Spain) Celta Vigo, (Turkey) Eskişehirspor, (Spain) Espanyol, (Georgia (country)) Dila Gori, (Georgia (country)) Merani Martvili, (Russia) Rubin Kazan, (Netherlands) Utrecht, (Lithuania) Atletas Kaunas, (Lithuania) Baltija, (Lithuania) Lietava, (Lithuania) Trakai, (Turkey) Giresunspor, (Turkey) Kayserispor, (England) Leicester City, (France) Le Mans, (England) Manchester City, (Portugal) Nacional, (England) Nottingham Forest, (Italy) Novara, (France) Nice, (France) Lyon, (Turkey) Orduspor, (Serbia) Partizan, (France) Lens, (Spain) Real Betis, (Spain) Real Sociedad, (Serbia) Red Star Belgrade, (Latvia) Skonto FC, (France) Caen, (Serbia) Spartak Zlatibor Voda, (Turkey) Torku Konyaspor, (England) Tottenham Hotspur, (France) Toulouse, (France) Troyes, (Spain) Valencia, (France) Valenciennes, (Portugal) Vitória de Setúbal

=== By club nationality ===
Players	Clubs
19	Netherlands
18	Spain, France
16	Georgia, Portugal
15	Serbia, Turkey
13	Lithuania
5	England
2	Germany, Italy
1	Belgium, Denmark, Latvia, Russia

Nations in italics are not represented by their national teams in the finals.
