= 2013 UEFA European Under-19 Championship elite qualification =

The 2013 UEFA European Under-19 Championship elite round is the second round of qualification for the 2013 UEFA European Under-19 Championship final tournament. The 25 teams that advanced from the first qualification round, plus three teams that received byes to the elite round, were distributed into seven groups of four teams, with one of the teams hosting all six group matches in a round-robin format. The seven group-winning teams will qualify automatically for the final tournament.

== Seeds ==
A total of 28 participating teams were divided in four draw pots based on the coefficient ranking list established by taking into account only the results of the qualifying round. Spain, Serbia and Turkey received byes to the elite round and were seeded in the first pot. The draw was held on 5 December 2012 in Nyon.

Pot A	Pot B	Pot C	Pot D
Spain; Serbia; Turkey; Austria; Netherlands; Denmark; Scotland	Germany; England; Croatia; Ukraine; France; Portugal; Republic of Ireland	Czech Republic; Russia; Poland; Norway; Bosnia and Herzegovina; Slovakia; Belgium	Switzerland; Bulgaria; Italy; Greece; Sweden; Georgia; Cyprus

== Tiebreakers ==
If two or more teams are equal on points on completion of the group matches, the following criteria are applied to determine the rankings.

1. Higher number of points obtained in the group matches played among the teams in question
2. Superior goal difference from the group matches played among the teams in question
3. Higher number of goals scored in the group matches played among the teams in question
4. If, after applying criteria 1) to 3) to several teams, two teams still have an equal ranking, the criteria 1) to 3) will be reapplied to determine the ranking of these teams. If this procedure does not lead to a decision, criteria 5) and 6) will apply
5. Results of all group matches:
  1. Superior goal difference
  2. Higher number of goals scored
6. Drawing of lots

Additionally, if two teams which have the same number of points and the same number of goals scored and conceded play their last group match against each other and are still equal at the end of that match, their final rankings are determined by the penalty shoot-out and not by the criteria listed above. This procedure is applicable only if a ranking of the teams is required to determine the group winner.

== Group 1 ==
Pos	Team	Pld	W	D	L	GF	GA	GD	Pts	Qualification
1	France	3	3	0	0	5	0	+5	9	Final tournament
2	Austria (H)	3	2	0	1	9	1	+8	6	
3	Sweden	3	1	0	2	3	8	−5	3	
4	Bosnia and Herzegovina	3	0	0	3	2	10	−8	0	

(H) Hosts
5 June 2013
11:00

France	3–0	Sweden
Hunou 8', 77'; Rabiot 56'	Report

Lindabrunn, Lindabrunn
Referee: Stavros Tritsonis (Greece)
5 June 2013
18:00

Austria	6–0	Bosnia and Herzegovina
Murg 29', 78'; Wimmer 53'; Sabitzer 66'; Schöpf 70'; Geissler 90+2'	Report

Sport- und Freizeitzentrum Traiskirchen, Traiskirchen
Referee: Daniel Stefański (Poland)

7 June 2013
11:00

Bosnia and Herzegovina	0–1	France
	Report	Benzia 25' (pen.)

Lindabrunn, Lindabrunn
Referee: Daniel Stefański (Poland)
7 June 2013
18:00

Austria	3–0	Sweden
Sabitzer 33', 37', 62'	Report

Sport- und Freizeitzentrum Traiskirchen, Traiskirchen
Referee: Dumitri Muntean (Moldova)

10 June 2013
18:00

France	1–0	Austria
Benzia 28'	Report

Sport- und Freizeitzentrum Traiskirchen, Traiskirchen
Referee: Stavros Tritsonis (Greece)
10 June 2013
18:00

Sweden	3–2	Bosnia and Herzegovina
Tanković 12', 87'; Lundholm 25'	Report	Hodžić 57'; Marić 77'

Lindabrunn, Lindabrunn
Referee: Dumitri Muntean (Moldova)

== Group 2 ==
Pos	Team	Pld	W	D	L	GF	GA	GD	Pts	Qualification
1	Serbia (H)	3	1	1	1	4	1	+3	4	Final tournament
2	Switzerland	3	1	1	1	3	4	−1	4	
3	Slovakia	3	1	1	1	4	6	−2	4	
4	Republic of Ireland	3	0	3	0	4	4	0	3	

(H) Hosts
6 June 2013
17:30

Serbia	4–0	Slovakia
Đurđević 42' (pen.), 43'; Luković 48'; Antić 57'	Report

Karađorđe Stadium, Novi Sad
Referee: Orel Greenfeld (Israel)
6 June 2013
17:30

Republic of Ireland	2–2	Switzerland
Byrne 16'; Sadlier 23'	Report	Frey 43'; Campo 52'

FK Obilić Stadium, Belgrade
Referee: Sergey Lapochkin (Russia)

8 June 2013
17:30

Serbia	0–1	Switzerland
	Report	Alesevic 66'

Karađorđe Stadium, Novi Sad
Referee: Nerijus Dunauskas (Lithuania)
8 June 2013
17:30

Slovakia	2–2	Republic of Ireland
Marcin 54'; Rusnák 90'	Report	Byrne 24'; Smith 90+2'

FK Obilić Stadium, Belgrade
Referee: Orel Greenfeld (Israel)

11 June 2013
17:30

Republic of Ireland	0–0	Serbia
	Report

Karađorđe Stadium, Novi Sad
Referee: Nerijus Dunauskas (Lithuania)
11 June 2013
17:30

Switzerland	0–2	Slovakia
	Report	Duda 24'; Rusnák 62' (pen.)

FK Obilić Stadium, Belgrade
Referee: Sergey Lapochkin (Russia)

== Group 3 ==
Pos	Team	Pld	W	D	L	GF	GA	GD	Pts	Qualification
1	Portugal (H)	3	3	0	0	12	1	+11	9	Final tournament
2	Denmark	3	2	0	1	10	1	+9	6	
3	Czech Republic	3	1	0	2	3	10	−7	3	
4	Bulgaria	3	0	0	3	1	14	−13	0	

(H) Hosts
4 June 2013
17:00

Denmark	5–0	Czech Republic
Zohore 21', 47'; Hýbl 38' (o.g.); Amankwaa 43'; Da Silva 82'	Report

Sports Center CF Fão, Fão
Referee: Mete Kalkavan (Turkey)
4 June 2013
19:00

Portugal	7–0	Bulgaria
Silva 6'; Paciência 18', 26', 90+2'; Costa 31'; Bruma 45+2'; Cancelo 88'	Report

Estádio do Mar, Matosinhos
Referee: Andreas Ekberg (Sweden)

6 June 2013
17:00

Denmark	5–0	Bulgaria
Lindberg 35', 42' (pen.), 64'; Nørgaard 61'; Nielsen 88'	Report

Póvoa de Varzim Municipal Stadium, Povoa do Varzim
Referee: Serdar Gözübüyük (Netherlands)
6 June 2013
19:00

Czech Republic	1–4	Portugal
Juliš 31'	Report	Bruma 20', 64', 87' (pen.); Teixeira 79'

Estádio Cidade de Barcelos, Barcelos
Referee: Mete Kalkavan (Turkey)

9 June 2013
19:00

Portugal	1–0	Denmark
Bruma 88' (pen.)	Report

Estádio Cidade de Barcelos, Barcelos
Referee: Serdar Gözübüyük (Netherlands)
9 June 2013
19:00

Bulgaria	1–2	Czech Republic
Vejmola 33' (o.g.)	Report	Svoboda 54'; Hýbl 67'

Póvoa de Varzim Municipal Stadium, Povoa do Varzim
Referee: Andreas Ekberg (Sweden)

== Group 4 ==
Pos	Team	Pld	W	D	L	GF	GA	GD	Pts	Qualification
1	Spain	3	2	1	0	4	1	+3	7	Final tournament
2	Croatia	3	1	2	0	4	2	+2	5	
3	Greece	3	0	2	1	2	4	−2	2	
4	Poland (H)	3	0	1	2	1	4	−3	1	

(H) Hosts
5 June 2013
13:00

Croatia	1–1	Greece
Kiš 66' (pen.)	Report	Goutas 12'

Stadion Miejski, Gdynia
Referee: Tore Hansen (Norway)
5 June 2013
18:00

Spain	1–0	Poland
Vico 28'	Report

Stadion Miejski, Gdynia
Referee: Anatolii Zhabchenko (Ukraine)

7 June 2013
13:00

Spain	2–0	Greece
Serrano 90+2'; Vico 90+3'	Report

Stadion Miejski im. Kazimierza Deyny, Starogard Gdański
Referee: Anthony Taylor (England)
7 June 2013
18:00

Poland	0–2	Croatia
	Report	Ivančić 53'; Alvir 79'

Stadion Miejski im. Kazimierza Deyny, Starogard Gdański
Referee: Anatolii Zhabchenko (Ukraine)

10 June 2013
18:00

Croatia	1–1	Spain
Brlek 55'	Report	Gómez 77'

Stadion Miejski im. Kazimierza Deyny, Starogard Gdański
Referee: Anthony Taylor (England)
10 June 2013
18:00

Greece	1–1	Poland
Sounas 56'	Report	Kurowski 45+1'

Stadion MOSiR, Gdańsk
Referee: Tore Hansen (Norway)

== Group 5 ==
Pos	Team	Pld	W	D	L	GF	GA	GD	Pts	Qualification
1	Netherlands	3	2	0	1	3	2	+1	6	Final tournament
2	Norway (H)	3	2	0	1	7	3	+4	6	
3	Germany	3	1	0	2	4	5	−1	3	
4	Cyprus	3	1	0	2	2	6	−4	3	

(H) Hosts
5 June 2013
14:00

Germany	3–1	Cyprus
Schnellhardt 43'; Werner 67'; Pledl 87' (pen.)	Report	Kyriakou 80'

Nedre Eiker Stadion, Mjøndalen
Referee: Petr Ardeleánu (Czech Republic)
5 June 2013
19:00

Netherlands	2–1	Norway
Darri 69'; Achahbar 84'	Report	Finne 62'

Nedre Eiker Stadion, Mjøndalen
Referee: Hugo Miguel (Portugal)

7 June 2013
14:00

Netherlands	0–1	Cyprus
	Report	Djamas 19'

Idrettsparken, Notodden
Referee: Petr Ardeleánu (Czech Republic)
7 June 2013
19:00

Norway	3–1	Germany
Omijuanfo 11'; Ovenstad 28'; Selnæs 49'	Report	Pledl 36' (pen.)

Idrettsparken, Notodden
Referee: Padraig Sutton (Republic of Ireland)

10 June 2013
18:00

Germany	0–1	Netherlands
	Report	Haye 90+2'

Idrettsparken, Notodden
Referee: Padraig Sutton (Republic of Ireland)
10 June 2013
18:00

Cyprus	0–3	Norway
	Report	Elyounoussi 56', 77'; Finne 80'

Nedre Eiker Stadion, Mjøndalen
Referee: Hugo Miguel (Portugal)

== Group 6 ==
Pos	Team	Pld	W	D	L	GF	GA	GD	Pts	Qualification
1	Georgia	3	2	1	0	6	2	+4	7	Final tournament
2	England	3	1	2	0	5	2	+3	5	
3	Belgium (H)	3	0	2	1	3	5	−2	2	
4	Scotland	3	0	1	2	3	8	−5	1	

(H) Hosts
24 May 2013
18:00

Scotland	2–2	Belgium
Beck 19'; Macleod 24'	Report	Verstraete 48'; De Sart 55'

De Leunen, Geel
Referee: Emir Alečković (Bosnia and Herzegovina)
24 May 2013
18:00

England	1–1	Georgia
Clayton 38'	Report	Pantsulaia 8'

KSV Bornem Stadion, Bornem
Referee: Sascha Amhof (Switzerland)

26 May 2013
15:00

Scotland	1–3	Georgia
Fraser 76'	Report	Kacharava 28'; Zivzivadze 66'; Endeladze 72'

KFC Oosterzonen Stadion, Westerlo
Referee: Carlos del Cerro (Spain)
26 May 2013
19:00

Belgium	1–1	England
Foket 27'	Report	Baker 90+5'

De Leunen, Geel
Referee: Emir Alečković (Bosnia and Herzegovina)

29 May 2013
18:00

England	3–0	Scotland
Coulthirst 17'; Baker 33' (pen.); Akpom 74'	Report

KFC Oosterzonen Stadion, Westerlo
Referee: Carlos del Cerro (Spain)
29 May 2013
18:00

Georgia	2–0	Belgium
Pantsulaia 56'; Samushia 78'	Report

KSV Bornem Stadion, Bornem
Referee: Sascha Amhof (Switzerland)

== Group 7 ==
Pos	Team	Pld	W	D	L	GF	GA	GD	Pts	Qualification
1	Turkey	3	3	0	0	9	2	+7	9	Final tournament
2	Italy	3	1	1	1	5	8	−3	4	
3	Ukraine	3	1	0	2	2	4	−2	3	
4	Russia (H)	3	0	1	2	5	7	−2	1	

(H) Hosts
22 May 2013
16:00

Ukraine	0–1	Italy
	Report	Rozzi 74'

FC Krasnodar Academy Stadium, Krasnodar
Referee: Harald Lechner (Austria)
22 May 2013
19:00

Turkey	2–1	Russia
Yılmaz Çalık 74', 82'	Report	Ovsyannikov 19' (pen.)

FC Krasnodar Academy Stadium, Krasnodar
Referee: Georgi Kabakov (Bulgaria)

24 May 2013
16:00

Turkey	5–1	Italy
Yokuşlu 9'; Çalhanoğlu 49' (pen.), 71' (pen.); İ. Yılmaz 55'; Uçan 67'	Report	Rozzi 27'

FC Krasnodar Academy Stadium, Krasnodar
Referee: Tobias Welz (Germany)
24 May 2013
19:00

Russia	1–2	Ukraine
Bolov 69'	Report	Khoblenko 11'; Yurchenko 31'

FC Krasnodar Academy Stadium, Krasnodar
Referee: Harald Lechner (Austria)

27 May 2013
19:00

Ukraine	0–2	Turkey
	Report	İ. Yılmaz 38', 76'

FC Krasnodar Academy Stadium, Krasnodar
Referee: Tobias Welz (Germany)
27 May 2013
19:00

Italy	3–3	Russia
Garritano 18'; Benassi 45'; Moroni 80'	Report	Panyukov 37', 46'; Efremov 52'

Kuban Stadium, Krasnodar
Referee: Georgi Kabakov (Bulgaria)

== Qualified teams ==
Country	Qualified as	Previous appearances in tournament^{1}
Lithuania	Hosts	0 (debut)
France	Group 1 winner	6 (2003, **2005**, 2007, 2009, **2010**, 2012)
Serbia	Group 2 winner	5 (2005, 2007, 2009, 2011, 2012)
Portugal	Group 3 winner	5 (2003, 2006, 2007, 2010, 2012)
Spain	Group 4 winner	9 (**2002**, **2004**, **2006**, **2007**, 2008, 2009, 2010, **2011**, **2012**)
Netherlands	Group 5 winner	1 (2010)
Georgia	Group 6 winner	0 (debut)
Turkey	Group 7 winner	4 (2004, 2006, 2009, 2011)

^{1} Only counted appearances for under-19 era (bold indicates champion for that year, while italic indicates hosts)
