= Dachi Tsnobiladze =

Georgian association football player

Personal information
- Date of birth: 28 January 1994 (age 32)
- Place of birth: Georgia
- Height: 1.81 m (5 ft 11 in)
- Position: Midfielder

Team information
- Current team: Sioni Bolnisi
- Number: 12

Senior career*
Years	Team	Apps	(Gls)
2012–2013	Metalurgi	2	(0)
2013–2014	Locomotive	13	(0)
2014–2015	Metalurgi	20	(5)
2014–2015	Sioni Bolnisi	10	(1)
2015–2016	Samtredia	36	(2)
2017–2018	Saburtalo	29	(3)
2018	Locomotive	8	(0)
2018–2022	Saburtalo	66	(5)
2023–2026	Telavi	87	(6)
2026–	Sioni Bolnisi	14	(0)

International career^{‡}
2010–2011	Georgia U17	4	(0)
2013	Georgia U19	6	(0)
2015–2016	Georgia U21	8	(0)
- * Club domestic league appearances and goals as of 11 July 2026 ‡ National team caps and goals as of 10 April 2025

Dachi Tsnobiladze (Georgian: დაჩი ცნობილაძე, born 28 January 1994) is a Georgian footballer who plays as a midfielder for Erovnuli Liga 2 club Sioni Bolnisi.

Tsnobiladze is the two-time winner of the Erovnuli Liga. He has also won the national cup and Supercup, and represented his country in each of the national youth teams.

== Club career ==
Dachi Tsnobiladze started his professional career at Metalurgi Rustavi. On 19 April 2013, he made his first Umaglesi Liga appearance in a goalless draw against Kolkheti 1913. The next year, Tsnobiladze scored his first goal which turned out to be a winner against Dinamo Batumi. In 2014, he established himself as one of the leaders at Metalurgi, scoring five times in 15 league appearances. He was at the same time studying law at Tbilisi State University.

In January 2015, Tsnobiladze joined Sioni under coach Lado Burduli for a half season and then moved to Samtredia where he would secure his first champion's title in 2016. In the same year, Tsnobiladze made his European debut in a UEFA Europa League tie against Gabala.

In 2017, Tsnobiladze signed for Saburtalo. Apart from a six-month period spent on loan at Locomotive, during the next five seasons he won another league title as well as two cups and one Supercup with Saburtalo.

In January 2023, Telavi announced the signing of ten new players, including Tsnobiladze. He was named the team captain for 2025.

== International career ==
Tsnobiladze was called up to national youth teams. He took part in four games of the 2011 UEFA European Under-17 Championship qualification campaign. As a U19 player, he was a member of the squad that qualified for 2013 UEFA European Under-19 Championship held in Lithuania. As Georgia failed to reach the quarterfinal stage, Tsnobiladze played all three group ties.

On 3 September 2015, he made his debut for the U21 team against Croatia. Subsequently, Tsnobiladze played in 2017 UEFA European Championship qualifying matches.

== Honours ==
Samtredia

- Umaglesi Liga: 2016

Saburtalo

- Erovnuli Liga: 2018
- Georgian Cup: 2019, 2021
- Supercup: 2020
