= Alexandre Guedes =

Portuguese footballer (born 1994)

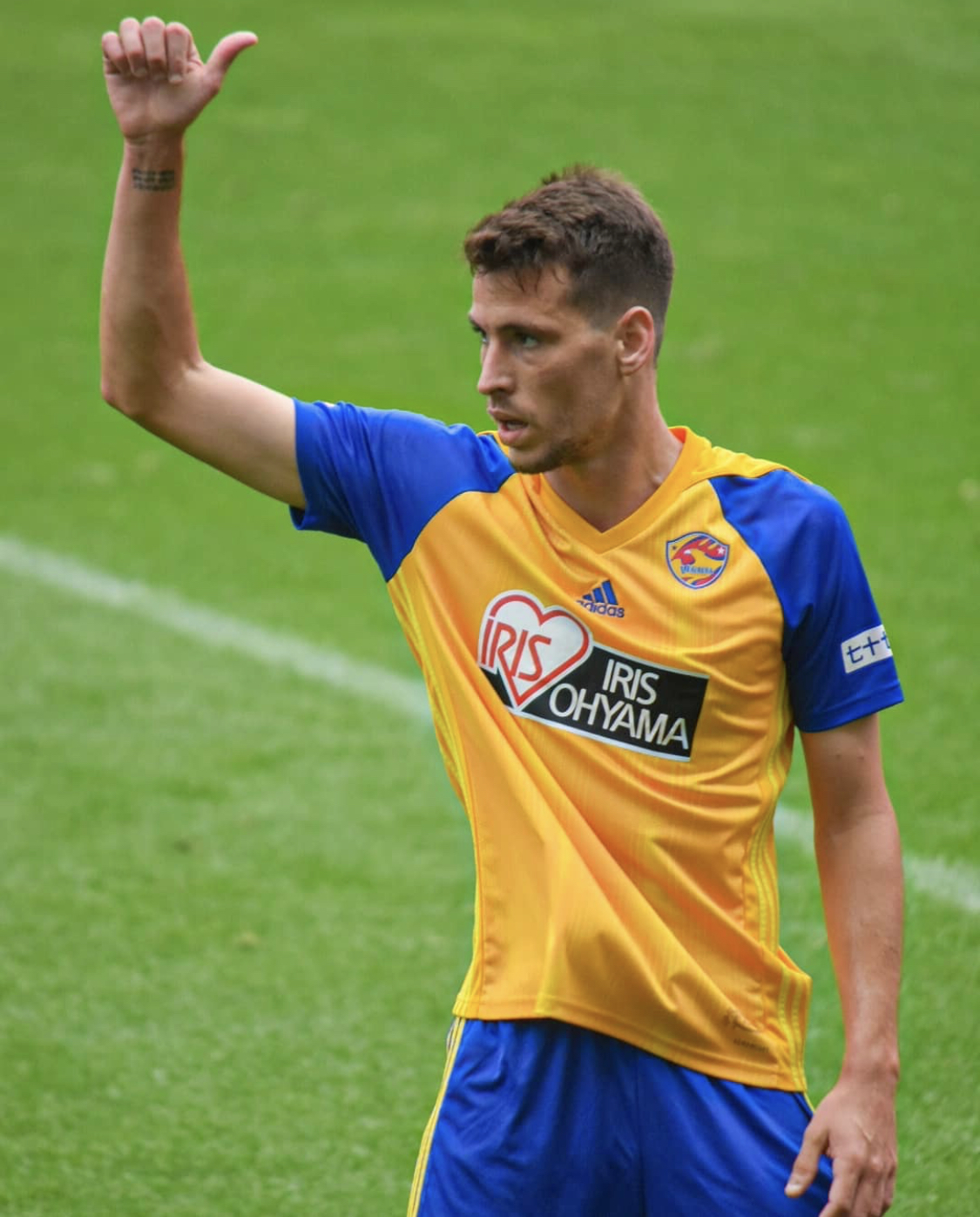
- Guedes with Vegalta Sendai

Personal information
- Full name: Alexandre Xavier Pereira Guedes
- Date of birth: 11 February 1994 (age 32)
- Place of birth: Arcozelo, Portugal
- Height: 1.85 m (6 ft 1 in)
- Position: Striker

Team information
- Current team: Feirense
- Number: 19

Youth career
- 2002–2005: São Félix Marinha
- 2005–2013: Sporting CP

Senior career*
Years	Team	Apps	(Gls)
2012–2014	Sporting CP B	3	(0)
2014–2015	Reus	26	(0)
2015–2018	Aves	94	(29)
2018–2021	Vitória Guimarães	31	(7)
2020	→ Vegalta Sendai (loan)	26	(5)
2021	Famalicão	14	(0)
2021	Raków Częstochowa	8	(0)
2022	Albirex Niigata	11	(2)
2023	Paços Ferreira	16	(1)
2023–2024	Petro Atlético	19	(7)
2024–2025	Al-Faisaly	16	(2)
2025–2026	Marítimo	23	(4)
2026–	Feirense	3	(0)

International career
2009	Portugal U15	2	(1)
2009–2010	Portugal U16	11	(4)
2010	Portugal U17	7	(3)
2011	Portugal U18	2	(0)
2013	Portugal U19	4	(3)
2014	Portugal U20	5	(0)
- * Club domestic league appearances and goals as of 18:45, 6 October 2026 (UTC)

Alexandre Xavier Pereira Guedes (born 11 February 1994) is a Portuguese professional footballer who plays as a striker for Liga Portugal 2 club Feirense.

== Club career ==
=== Sporting CP ===
Born in Arcozelo (Vila Nova de Gaia), Guedes joined Sporting CP's youth system in 2005, aged 11, and went on to score 53 goals for its various teams. On 16 December 2012, still a junior, he made his senior debut with the B side, coming on as a substitute for Bruma in the last minute of a 2–1 away win against C.D. Tondela in the Segunda Liga.

On 29 January 2014, Guedes was sold to Spanish club CF Reus Deportiu until June, alongside teammate Tobias Figueiredo (who was loaned). He failed to find the net during his one-and-a-half-year stint in the Segunda División B with the Catalans.

=== Aves ===
In August 2015, Guedes agreed to a two-year deal at C.D. Aves in his country's second tier. He scored 13 goals in each of his first two seasons in Aves, helping to Primeira Liga promotion at the end of 2016–17 and subsequently renewing his contract.

Guedes made his debut in the top flight on 6 August 2017, playing the full 90 minutes in a 0–2 home loss to former club Sporting. On 5 May 2018, he was one of the scorers as the team won 3–0 at Moreirense F.C. in the penultimate round of games to ensure another year at the top tier. Fifteen days later, he netted twice to help to a 2–1 defeat of Sporting in the final of the Taça de Portugal.

=== Vitória Guimarães ===
Guedes left for Vitória S.C. on 4 July 2018 for a €500.000 fee on a five-year contract, with Aves maintaining 50% of his economic rights. He scored his first goals on 8 October, a brace in a 3–1 away victory over C.S. Marítimo. His team finished the campaign in fifth, and qualified for the UEFA Europa League.

In January 2020, Guedes was loaned to Vegalta Sendai of the Japanese J1 League.

=== Famalicão ===
Guedes returned to the Portuguese top division on 8 January 2021, signing a three-and-a-half-year deal with F.C. Famalicão. He failed to find the net during his spell, in eight starts.

=== Raków Częstochowa ===
On 23 July 2021, Guedes joined Polish Ekstraklasa club Raków Częstochowa on a three-year contract with an option to extend for a further two seasons. He made 11 appearances before leaving by mutual consent on 14 December.

=== Later career ===
Guedes returned to Japan in March 2022, agreeing to a deal at J2 League's Albirex Niigata. He went back to Portugal in the 2023 January transfer window, with F.C. Paços de Ferreira who were last in the top flight. He scored his only goal on 21 May in the 3–1 home defeat of Rio Ave FC, not being able to prevent relegation as second-bottom.

On 27 July 2023, Guedes signed for Atlético Petróleos de Luanda, reigning champions of the Angolan Girabola. In July 2024, he moved to the Saudi First Division League on a contract at Al-Faisaly FC.

Guedes returned to Portugal in January 2025, on a one-and-a-half-year deal at second-tier club C.S. Marítimo. He spent most of his spell in Madeira on the sidelines, due to an ankle injury.

Guedes remained in the division in the 2026–27 campaign, joining C.D. Feirense.

== International career ==
While in representation of the Portugal under-19 side, Guedes was one of three top scorers at the 2013 UEFA European Championship in Lithuania with his tally of three goals. He recorded two in a 4–1 group win over the Netherlands and one more in a 2–2 draw with Serbia in the semi-finals, though his attempt was saved by Predrag Rajković as the Serbs won on penalties.

== Career statistics ==
As of match played 5 December 2023

Appearances and goals by club, season and competition
Club	Season	League			National cup (Note: Includes Taça de Portugal, Polish Cup, Emperor's Cup)		League cup (Note: Includes Taça da Liga)		Continental		Other		Total	
Club	Season	Division	Apps	Goals	Apps	Goals	Apps	Goals	Apps	Goals	Apps	Goals	Apps	Goals
Sporting CP B	2012–13	Segunda Liga	1	0	—		—		—		—		1	0
Sporting CP B	2013–14	Segunda Liga	2	0	—		—		—		—		2	0
Sporting CP B	Total		3	0	—		—		—		—		3	0
Reus	2013–14	Segunda División B	15	0	—		—		—		—		15	0
Reus	2014–15	Segunda División B	11	0	—		—		—		2 (Note: Appearances in Segunda División B play-offs)	0	13	0
Reus	Total		26	0	—		—		—		2	0	28	0
Aves	2015–16	LigaPro	37	13	2	1	0	0	—		—		39	14
Aves	2016–17	LigaPro	37	13	0	0	1	0	—		—		38	13
Aves	2017–18	Primeira Liga	20	3	2	2	1	0	—		—		23	5
Aves	Total		94	29	4	3	2	0	—		—		100	32
Vitória Guimarães	2018–19	Primeira Liga	29	6	3	1	1	0	—		—		33	7
Vitória Guimarães	2019–20	Primeira Liga	2	1	0	0	1	0	5 (Note: Appearances in UEFA Europa League)	1	—		8	2
Vitória Guimarães	Total		31	7	3	1	2	0	5	1	—		41	9
Vegalta Sendai (loan)	2020	J1 League	26	5	—		—		—		—		26	5
Famalicão	2020–21	Primeira Liga	14	0	0	0	0	0	—		—		14	0
Raków Częstochowa	2021–22	Ekstraklasa	8	0	1	0	—		2 (Note: Appearances in UEFA Europa Conference League)	0	—		11	0
Albirex Niigata	2022	J2 League	11	2	1	0	—		—		—		12	2
Paços Ferreira	2022–23	Primeira Liga	16	1	0	0	0	0	—		—		16	1
Petro Atlético	2023–24	Girabola	4	0	0	0	0	0	4	3	3	0	11	3
Career total			233	44	9	4	4	0	11	4	5	0	262	52

== Honours ==
Aves

- Taça de Portugal: 2017–18

Raków Częstochowa

- Polish Cup: 2021–22

Albirex Niigata

- J2 League: 2022

Marítimo

- Liga Portugal 2: 2025–26

Individual

- UEFA European Under-19 Championship top scorer: 2013 (shared with Gratas Sirgėdas and Anass Achahbar)
