= Aleksei Kulbakov =

Belarusian football referee (born 1979)

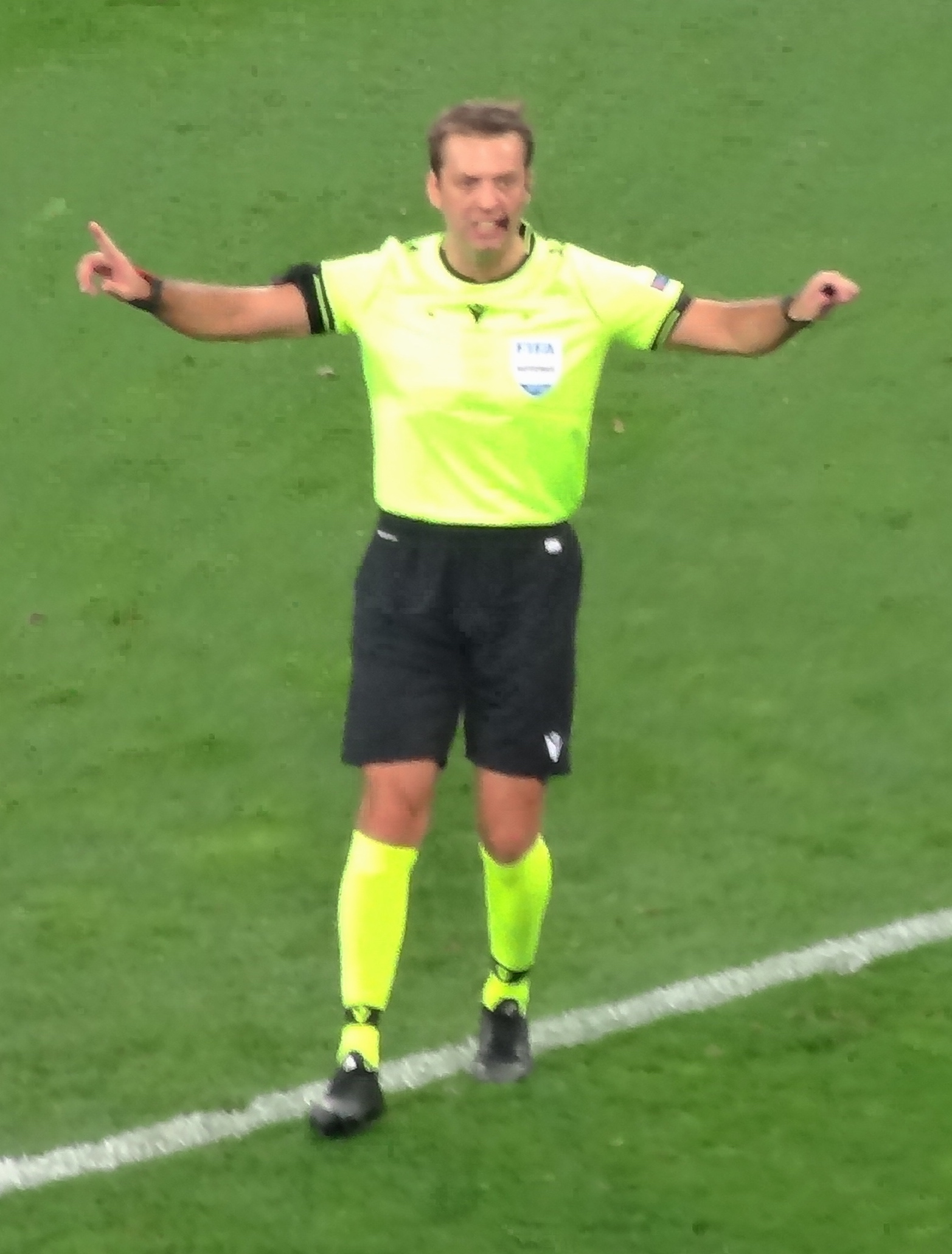
- Full name: Alyaksey Mikalayevich Kulbakow
- Born: 17 December 1979 (age 46); Gomel, Belarus, Soviet Union

International
Years	League	Role
2005–2024	FIFA	Referee

Alyaksey Mikalayevich Kulbakow (Belarusian: Аляксей Мікалаевіч Кульбакоў; born 27 December 1979) is a Belarusian former football referee, who is a listed international referee since 2005 until 2024. He is a FIFA-licensed and UEFA elite group referee. He is the only Belarusian official who regularly takes part in the group stages of UEFA club competitions.

Kulbakov started his refereeing career very early – at the age of 16. He went through all Belarusian divisions quite quickly and has officiated his first top league match in Belarus in 2003 when he was only 23. It happened quite often those times that Kulbakov was the youngest man on the pitch. Kulbakow became a FIFA-licensed referee just two years later, in 2005 until 2024, at the age of 25 (minimal possible age for FIFA referees).

His debut in international A-team level took place 12 September 2007 when Cyprus won 3–0 against San-Marino in EURO 2008 qualifier. In 2008, he was selected as one of the 19 participants of the UEFA Talents and Mentors program for perspective European referees. During the next two years (2008 and 2009) in the framework of this program Alexey officiated all his UEFA matches under supervision of the same referee observer Andreas Schluchter from Switzerland. Starting from the season 2009/2010 Kulbakov regularly officiates matches in the UEFA Europa League group stage. His first match at this level took place 17 September 2009 CFR Cluj won 2–0 against København in Cluj-Napoca.

He is also in charge in A-team international matches, including 2010 and 2014 World Cup qualifiers as well as 2008 and 2012 UEFA EURO qualifiers.

Kulbakov has missed the first half of 2013 national championship due to injury. In June 2013 Kulbakov together with 5 other referees was selected to officiate the final tournament of UEFA U-19 EURO 2013 which took place in Lithuania in July 2013.
