= Milan Vojvodić =

Serbian footballer

Personal information
- Full name: Milan Vojvodić
- Date of birth: 20 January 1994 (age 32)
- Place of birth: Kikinda, FR Yugoslavia
- Height: 1.75 m (5 ft 9 in)
- Position: Midfielder

Team information
- Current team: Kozara Banatsko Veliko Selo

Senior career*
Years	Team	Apps	(Gls)
2012–2014	Spartak Subotica	20	(0)
2014	→ Bačka 1901 (loan)		
2015	SPG Mötz/Silz	14	(0)
2015	Polet Nakovo		
2016	Senta		
2017	Pobeda Prilep		
2017–2018	Blaubeuren		
2018–2019	Sloboda Novi Kozarci		
2019–	Kozara Banatsko Veliko Selo		

International career^{‡}
2013	Serbia U19	3	(0)
Medal record
Gold medal – first place	UEFA Under-19 Championship	2013
- * Club domestic league appearances and goals as of 27 September 2014 ‡ National team caps and goals as of 2 June 2014

Milan Vojvodić (Serbian Cyrillic: Милан Војводић; born 20 January 1994) is a Serbian footballer who plays for Kozara Banatsko Veliko Selo.
