= Estadio Merkatondoa =

Spanish stadium

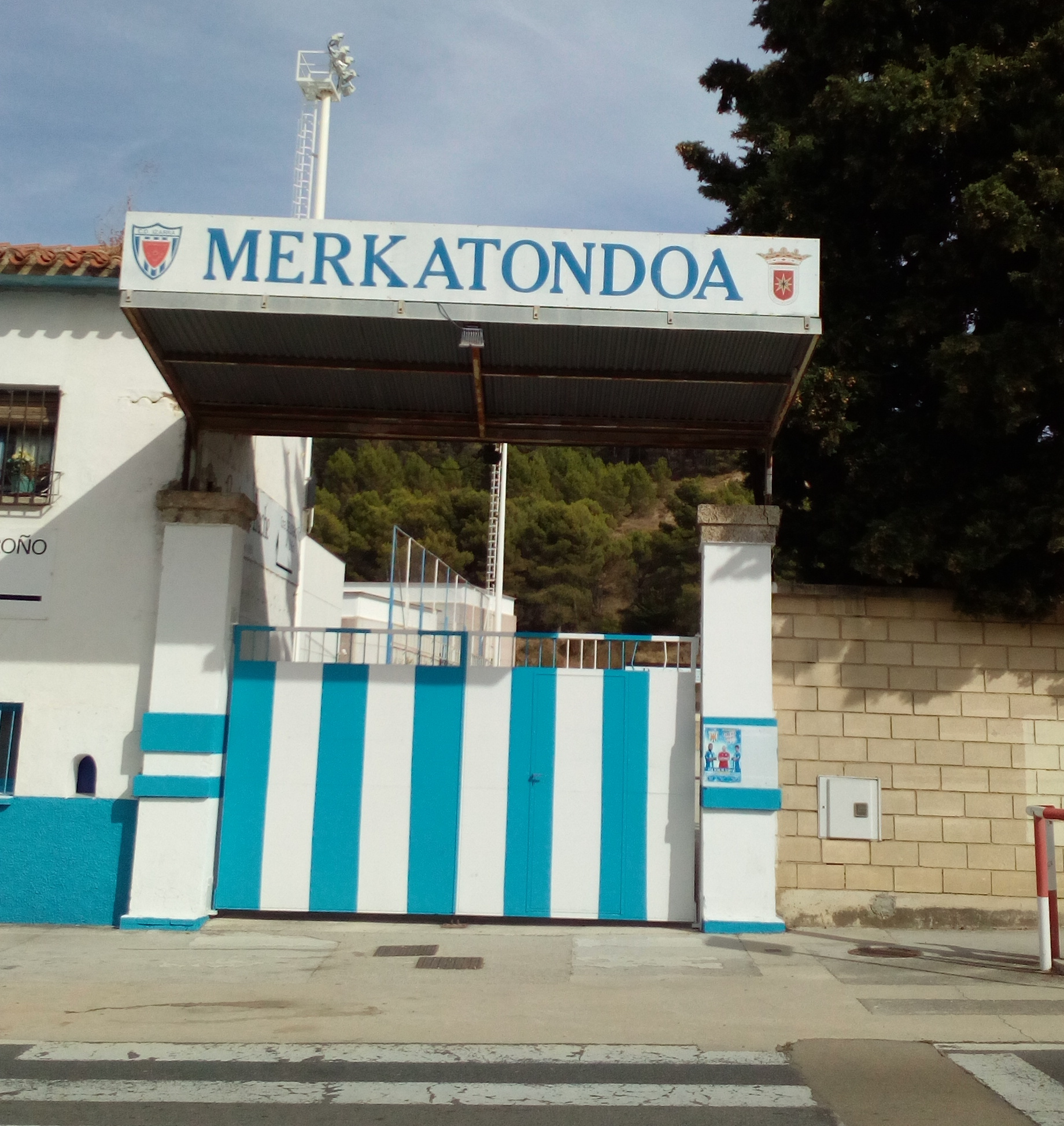
- Interactive map of Estadio Merkatondoa
- Full name: Estadio Merkatondoa
- Location: Estella-Lizarra, Navarra, Spain
- Coordinates: 42°39′39″N 2°1′45″W
- Owner: City Council Estella
- Operator: CD Izarra
- Capacity: 3,500
- Surface: cesped artificial
- Record attendance: 3,000 (CD Izarra vs CF Palencia, 24 May 2009)
- Field size: 102 x 65 m

Construction
- Built: 1928
- Opened: 1928
- Renovated: 2008

Tenant
- CD Izarra

Estadio Merkatondoa, is a stadium in Estella-Lizarra, Navarra, Spain. It has a capacity of 3,500 spectators and opened in 1929. It is the home of CD Izarra of the Segunda División B.

== History ==
Merkatondoa opened on 11 November 1928 and much of what you see is as a result of building that took place in the 1987. And in 2009 an artificial surface was installed.

=== Stadium background ===
Stadium Merkatondoa (1928 – 1941)
Estadio San Andrés (1941 – 1978)
Estadio Merkatondoa (1978 – Present)
