= Julio Iricibar =

Spanish footballer

Personal information
- Full name: Julio Iricibar Bayarri
- Date of birth: 24 October 1993 (age 33)
- Place of birth: Valladolid, Spain
- Height: 1.82 m (6 ft 0 in)
- Position: Goalkeeper

Team information
- Current team: Zamora

Youth career
- 2002–2012: Valladolid

Senior career*
Years	Team	Apps	(Gls)
2012–2016	Valladolid B	106	(0)
2014–2016	Valladolid	3	(0)
2017	Ciudad Lucena	1	(0)
2017–2019	Izarra	77	(0)
2019–2020	UCAM Murcia	22	(0)
2020–2021	Izarra	17	(0)
2021–	Calahorra	7	(0)
- * Club domestic league appearances and goals as of 9 October 2021

Julio Iricibar Bayarri (born 24 October 1993) is a Spanish footballer who plays as a goalkeeper for Zamora CF.

== Football career ==
Born in Valladolid, Castile and León, Iricibar graduated with Real Valladolid's youth ranks. He made his senior debuts with the reserves in the 2012–13 campaign, in Tercera División.

Iricibar played his first match as a professional on 7 September 2014, replacing field player Omar Ramos in the 76th minute of a 3–1 home win against Racing de Santander in the Segunda División. Always a third-choice, his spell was mainly limited to B-team appearances until his departure in 2016.

On 7 March 2017, after eight months without a club, Iricibar signed for CD Ciudad de Lucena in the regional leagues. On 16 May, he returned to the third division after agreeing to a contract with CD Izarra.
