= Gorka Laborda =

Spanish footballer

Personal information
- Full name: Gorka Laborda García
- Date of birth: 13 April 1989 (age 37)
- Place of birth: Pamplona, Spain
- Height: 1.77 m (5 ft 10 in)
- Position: Forward

Team information
- Current team: Doneztebe (manager)

Youth career
- Osasuna
- Lagunak

Senior career*
Years	Team	Apps	(Gls)
2008–2010	Benidorm	40	(2)
2010–2012	Bilbao Athletic	14	(1)
2012–2013	Peña Sport	15	(3)
2013	Alavés	21	(5)
2016–2017	Mutilvera	28	(7)
2017–2024	Izarra	199	(34)

Managerial career
- 2025–: Doneztebe
- * Club domestic league appearances and goals

Gorka Laborda García (born 13 April 1989) is a Spanish former footballer who played as a forward, and the current manager of Doneztebe FT.

== Football career ==
Laborda finished his formation with local SD Lagunak, and made his senior debuts with Benidorm CF in the 2008–09 season. In 2010, he left the club and joined Athletic Bilbao, being assigned to the reserves also in Segunda División B. However, after appearing sparingly in his first season and being left out of the squad in the second, he was released.

In July 2012 Laborda signed for another club in the third level, Peña Sport FC. On 7 January 2013 he joined Deportivo Alavés, and achieved promotion at the end of the campaign, scoring five goals in 17 matches.

On 16 August 2013 Laborda played his first professional match, in a 0–1 away defeat against Girona FC in the Segunda División championship. On 30 December, he was deemed surplus to requirements and was subsequently released.

Laborda remained as a free agent until July 2016, signing for UD Mutilvera in the third division.
