= Martín Bengoa =

Spanish footballer

Personal information
- Full name: Martín Bengoa Díez
- Date of birth: 21 November 1994 (age 31)
- Place of birth: Otxandio, Spain
- Height: 1.76 m (5 ft 9 1/2 in)
- Position: Midfielder

Youth career
- 2008–2012: Athletic Bilbao

Senior career*
Years	Team	Apps	(Gls)
2012–2014	Basconia	72	(3)
2014–2017	Bilbao Athletic	65	(9)
2017–2018	Deportivo B	25	(0)
2018	Leioa	15	(0)
2019	CR Al Hoceima	14	(5)
2019–2021	Moghreb Tétouan	23	(1)
2021–2022	Anagennisi Karditsa	26	(3)
2022–2023	Gernika	17	(3)
2023–2024	Izarra	27	(1)
- * Club domestic league appearances and goals as of 14 April 2024

Martín Bengoa Díez (born 21 November 1994) is a Spanish professional footballer who plays as a central midfielder.

== Club career ==
Born in Otxandio, Biscay, Basque Country, Bengoa joined Athletic Bilbao's youth setup in 2008, aged 13. He made his debut as a senior with the farm team in the 2012–13 campaign, in Tercera División.

On 26 May 2014, Bengoa was promoted to the reserves in Segunda División B. He contributed with 28 appearances and four goals during the season, as the B-side returned to Segunda División after a 19-year absence.

Bengoa made his professional debut on 16 January 2016, coming on as a second-half substitute for Mikel Vesga in a 0–2 away loss against CD Tenerife. He featured rarely during that campaign, but after they were relegated, he remained with the reserves in the following season, this time playing in most of the matches (34, with five goals).

In May 2017, Bengoa left Athletic after his contract expired, and moved to another reserve team, Deportivo Fabril also in the third division, on 3 July. On 21 August 2018, he signed for fellow league team SD Leioa.

On 19 December 2018, Bengoa signed for CR Al Hoceima in Morocco on a contract until June 2019. He then joined another club in the same country, Moghreb Tétouan on a two-year contract, after rejecting offers from clubs in Morocco and Saudi Arabia.
