= Doneztebe FT =

Association football club in Spain

Doneztebe
- Full name: Doneztebe Futbol Taldea
- Founded: 26 June 2003; 23 years ago
- Ground: Iñaki Indart, Doneztebe, Navarre, Spain
- Capacity: 300
- President: Garaikoiz Urroz
- Manager: Gorka Laborda
- League: Tercera Federación – Group 15
- 2025–26: Primera Autonómica, 1st of 18 (champions)
- Website: www.doneztebefutboltaldea.com
Home colours	Away colours

Doneztebe Futbol Taldea is a Spanish football team based in Doneztebe, in the autonomous community of Navarre. Founded in 2003, it plays in Tercera Federación – Group 15, holding home matches at Campo de Fútbol Iñaki Indart.

== History ==
With young people having to go to nearby towns such as Elizondo or Lesaka to play football, a group of parents founded Doneztebe on 26 June 2003. Registered in July, the club started playing youth tournaments in the following year.

In 2007, Doneztebe started a senior team in the Primera Regional, and achieved promotion to the Regional Preferente in 2016. Promoted to Primera Autonómica in June 2021, the club suffered immediate relegation.

Promoted to the Primera Autonómica in 2025, Doneztebe achieved a first-ever promotion to a national division on 25 April 2026, reaching the Tercera Federación despite a 1–0 loss to CD Baztán.

== Season to season ==
Season	Tier	Division	Place	Copa del Rey
2007–08	6	1ª Reg.	8th	
2008–09	6	1ª Reg.	4th	
2009–10	6	1ª Reg.	11th	
2010–11	6	1ª Reg.	8th	
2011–12	6	1ª Reg.	14th	
2012–13	6	1ª Reg.	14th	
2013–14	6	1ª Reg.	8th	
2014–15	6	1ª Reg.	5th	
2015–16	7	1ª Reg.	1st	
2016–17	6	Reg. Pref.	3rd	
2017–18	6	Reg. Pref.	3rd	
2018–19	6	Reg. Pref.	4th	
2019–20	6	Reg. Pref.	7th	
2020–21	6	Reg. Pref.	2nd	
2021–22	6	1ª Aut.	8th	
2022–23	7	Reg. Pref.	8th	
2023–24	7	Reg. Pref.	7th	
2024–25	7	Reg. Pref.	1st	
2025–26	6	1ª Aut.	1st	
2026–27	5	3ª Fed.		

- 1 season in Tercera Federación
