= 2013 UEFA European Under-19 Championship =

2013 m. Europos U-19 futbolo čempionatas

Tournament details
- Host country: Lithuania
- Dates: 20 July – 1 August
- Teams: 8 (from 1 confederation)
- Venues: 3 (in 3 host cities)

Final positions
- Champions: Serbia (1st title)
- Runners-up: France

Tournament statistics
- Matches played: 15
- Goals scored: 47 (3.13 per match)
- Attendance: 56,169 (3,745 per match)
- Top scorer(s): (Lithuania) Gratas Sirgėdas (Netherlands) Anass Achahbar (Portugal) Alexandre Guedes (3 goals)
- Best player: (Serbia) Aleksandar Mitrović

The 2013 UEFA European Under-19 Championship was the 12th edition of the UEFA European Under-19 Championship, since its reclassification from an under-18 tournament in 2002, and the 62nd since the tournament was created in 1948. It was hosted in Lithuania from 20 July to 1 August 2013, in three cities. Only players born after 1 January 1994 were eligible to participate.

The qualification matches began in September 2012 and concluded in June 2013, with seven teams joining the Lithuanian hosts in the final tournament. Spain were the two-time defending champions, after defeating Greece in the final of the previous edition, but were eliminated by France in the semi-finals. In the final, France were beaten 1–0 by Serbia.

== Bids ==
Eight national associations showed interest in hosting the final tournament, but only Lithuania, Germany, Hungary, and Slovenia reached the final bidding stage. On 4 October 2010, Lithuania were announced as the hosts in a meeting of the UEFA Executive Committee in Minsk, Belarus.

== Venues ==
Location map of the final tournament host cities

The final round matches were held in three stadium venues located in three Lithuanian cities:

Stadium	Location	Capacity	Matches	Ref
Alytus Stadium	Alytus	3,748	4 group matches and 1 semi-final	
Darius and Girėnas Stadium	Kaunas	9,280	4 group matches and 1 semi-final	
ARVI Football Arena	Marijampolė	6,250	4 group matches and the final	

== Qualification ==
Qualification for the final tournament occurred in two phases: a qualifying round and an elite round. During these rounds, 51 national teams competed to determine the seven teams that would join the automatically qualified host nation, Lithuania.

The qualifying round was played between 26 September and 26 November 2012, following a draw that took place on 29 November 2011 at the UEFA headquarters in Nyon, Switzerland. According to the UEFA under-19 national team coefficient ranking, the top three teams – Spain, Serbia and Turkey – were given a bye to the elite round, whereas the remaining 48 teams were divided into two pots and drawn into 12 groups of four teams. Each group included two teams from both pots and was contested as a round-robin tournament, hosted in the country of one of the teams. The group winners and runners-up, along with the best third-placed team, qualified for the next round.

The elite round was played between 22 May and 11 June 2012 and was contested by the 25 teams advancing from the qualifying round plus the three teams which received byes. The draw took place on 5 December 2012 at the UEFA headquarters and allocated the 28 teams – previously arranged into four seeding pots according to their qualifying round coefficient (teams with bye were automatically seeded in the first pot) – into seven groups of four. Each group was contested similarly to the qualifying round, with the seven group winners securing qualification for the final tournament.

=== Qualified teams ===
The following eight teams qualified for the final tournament:

Country	Qualified as	Previous appearances in final tournament^{1} only U-19 era (since 2002)
Lithuania	Hosts	0 (debut)
France	Winner of Group 1	6 (2003, **2005**, 2007, 2009, **2010**, 2012)
Serbia	Winner of Group 2	5 (2005^{2}, 2007, 2009, 2011, 2012)
Portugal	Winner of Group 3	5 (2003, 2006, 2007, 2010, 2012)
Spain	Winner of Group 4	9 (**2002**, **2004**, **2006**, **2007**, 2008, 2009, 2010, **2011**, **2012**)
Netherlands	Winner of Group 5	1 (2010)
Georgia	Winner of Group 6	0 (debut)
Turkey	Winner of Group 7	4 (2004, 2006, 2009, 2011)

^{1} Bold indicates champion for that year. Italic indicates host for that year.
^{2} As Serbia and Montenegro

== Match officials ==
UEFA named six referees and eight assistant referees to officiate matches at the final tournament. Additionally, two referees from the host nation were chosen as fourth officials.

Referees

- Aleksei Kulbakov (Belarus)
- Emir Alečković (Bosnia and Herzegovina) (Note: Bosnian referee Emir Alečković was officially suspended from this tournament.)
- Michael Oliver (England)
- Felix Zwayer (Germany)
- Orel Grinfeld (Israel)
- Martin Strömbergsson (Sweden)

Assistant referees

- Mubariz Hashimov (Azerbaijan)
- (Republic of Ireland) Dermot Broughton (Ireland)
- Stelios Nikita (Cyprus)
- Derya Oguz (Denmark)
- Michael Karsiotis (Greece)
- Mitchell Scerri (Malta)
- Nikola Razić (Montenegro)
- Leif Erik Opland (Norway)

Fourth officials

- Gediminas Mažeika (Lithuania)
- Sergejus Slyva (Lithuania)

== Group stage ==
2013 UEFA European Under-19 Championship teams and final classification

The draw for the group stage was held on 14 June 2013 in Kaunas, at the Town Hall, and was conducted by the UEFA Youth and Amateur Football Committee chairman, Jim Boyce, who was assisted by final tournament ambassadors Vaida Česnauskienė and Marius Stankevičius. The eight finalists were drawn into two groups of four teams and played matches against each other in a round-robin system. The top two teams from each group advanced to the semi-finals.

If two or more teams are equal on points on completion of the group matches, the following tie-breaking criteria are applied:

1. Higher number of points obtained in the matches played between the teams in question;
2. Superior goal difference resulting from the matches played between the teams in question;
3. Higher number of goals scored in the matches played between the teams in question;
4. If two teams are still tied after criteria 1–3 have been applied, the criteria are reapplied on those teams. If the tie is not broken, criteria 5–8 are applied;
5. Superior goal difference in all group matches;
6. Higher number of goals scored in all group matches;
7. Fair play conduct of the teams (final tournament);
8. Drawing of lots.

If two teams are tied after having met in the last round of the group stage, their final ranking is determined instead by a penalty shoot-out. This method is only valid when determining which team qualifies for the next round or for another competition.

All times are in Eastern European Summer Time (UTC+03:00).

=== Group A ===
Pos	Team	Pld	W	D	L	GF	GA	GD	Pts	Qualification
1	Spain	3	3	0	0	6	2	+4	9	Knockout stage
2	Portugal	3	2	0	1	8	4	+4	6	Knockout stage
3	Netherlands	3	1	0	2	6	9	−3	3	
4	Lithuania (H)	3	0	0	3	4	9	−5	0	

(H) Hosts
20 July 2013
18:30

Lithuania	2–3	Netherlands
Artimavičius 38'; Sirgėdas 83'	Report	Achahbar 10', 29'; Vloet 90+6'

Darius and Girėnas Stadium, Kaunas
Attendance: 7,436
Referee: Martin Strömbergsson (Sweden)
20 July 2013
21:15

Spain	1–0	Portugal
Ramírez 19'	Report

ARVI Arena, Marijampolė
Attendance: 2,900
Referee: Felix Zwayer (Germany)

23 July 2013
16:30

Netherlands	1–4	Portugal
Vloet 90+1'	Report	Guedes 32', 89'; L. Silva 73'; Horta 87'

Alytus Stadium, Alytus
Attendance: 3,170
Referee: Michael Oliver (England)
23 July 2013
18:30

Lithuania	0–2	Spain
	Report	Hernández 6', 74'

Darius and Girėnas Stadium, Kaunas
Attendance: 8,900
Referee: Aleksei Kulbakov (Belarus)

26 July 2013
21:00

Portugal	4–2	Lithuania
Lopes 8'; Petrauskas 45' (o.g.); Figueiredo 51' (pen.); Mané 65'	Report	Sirgėdas 53', 90+2'

Darius and Girėnas Stadium, Kaunas
Attendance: 8,075
Referee: Orel Grinfeld (Israel)
26 July 2013
21:00

Netherlands	2–3	Spain
Mahi 36'; Achahbar 90+1' (pen.)	Report	Ramírez 68'; Vadillo 81'; Vico 83'

Alytus Stadium, Alytus
Attendance: 3,618
Referee: Aleksei Kulbakov (Belarus)

=== Group B ===
Pos	Team	Pld	W	D	L	GF	GA	GD	Pts	Qualification
1	Serbia	3	2	1	0	4	2	+2	7	Knockout stage
2	France	3	1	2	0	3	2	+1	5	Knockout stage
3	Turkey	3	1	0	2	6	6	0	3	
4	Georgia	3	0	1	2	2	5	−3	1	

20 July 2013
17:00

Serbia	2–1	Turkey
Luković 17'; Mitrović 54'	Report	Niyaz 88'

ARVI Arena, Marijampolė
Attendance: 450
Referee: Michael Oliver (England)
20 July 2013
19:00

Georgia	0–0	France
	Report

Alytus Stadium, Alytus
Attendance: 2,500
Referee: Emir Alečković (Bosnia and Herzegovina)

23 July 2013
18:30

Serbia	1–0	Georgia
Meleg 74'	Report

ARVI Arena, Marijampolė
Attendance: 1,100
Referee: Orel Grinfeld (Israel)
23 July 2013
20:45

Turkey	1–2	France
Yılmaz 87' (pen.)	Report	Hunou 6'; Benzia 64'

Alytus Stadium, Alytus
Attendance: 1,915
Referee: Martin Strömbergsson (Sweden)

26 July 2013
16:30

France	1–1	Serbia
Hunou 31'	Report	Pavlovski 77'

Darius and Girėnas Stadium, Kaunas
Attendance: 1,228
Referee: Felix Zwayer (Germany)
26 July 2013
16:30

Turkey	4–2	Georgia
Deniz 16', 18'; Niyaz 58'; Şahin 80'	Report	Endeladze 3'; Kacharava 50'

ARVI Arena, Marijampolė
Attendance: 950
Referee: Gediminas Mažeika (Lithuania)

== Knockout stage ==
=== Bracket ===
Semi-finals
29 July – Alytus
Serbia (p)	2 (3)
Portugal	2 (2)
29 July – Kaunas
Spain	1
France (a.e.t.)	2

Final
1 August – Marijampolė
Serbia	1
France	0

=== Semifinals ===
29 July 2013
16:30

Serbia	2–2 (a.e.t.)	Portugal
Đurđević 6'; Gaćinović 85'	Report	B. Silva 55'; Guedes 79'
Penalties
Pavlovski (penalty missed); Milinković-Savić (penalty scored); Meleg (penalty missed); Gaćinović (penalty scored); Mitrović (penalty scored)	3–2	(penalty scored) Ié; (penalty scored) Horta; (penalty missed) Guedes; (penalty missed) Rafa; (penalty missed) Teixeira

Alytus Stadium, Alytus
Attendance: 3,280
Referee: Michael Oliver (England)

29 July 2013
21:00

Spain	1–2 (a.e.t.)	France
Rodríguez 27' (pen.)	Report	Benzia 29'; Conte 105'

Darius and Girėnas Stadium, Kaunas
Attendance: 4,436
Referee: Orel Grinfeld (Israel)

=== Final ===
1 August 2013
21:45

France	0–1	Serbia
	Report	Luković 57'

ARVI Football Arena, Marijampolė
Attendance: 6,211
Referee: Aleksei Kulbakov (Belarus)

== Goalscorers ==
3 goals

- (Netherlands) Anass Achahbar
- (Lithuania) Gratas Sirgėdas
- (Portugal) Alexandre Guedes

2 goals

- (France) Yassine Benzia
- (France) Adrien Hunou
- (Netherlands) Rai Vloet
- (Serbia) Andrija Luković
- (Spain) Iker Hernández
- (Spain) Sandro Ramírez
- (Turkey) Okan Deniz
- (Turkey) Recep Niyaz

1 goal

- (France) Antoine Conte
- (Georgia (country)) Avto Endeladze
- (Georgia (country)) Nika Kacharava
- (Lithuania) Lukas Artimavičius
- (Netherlands) Mimoun Mahi
- (Portugal) Tobias Figueiredo
- (Portugal) Ricardo Horta
- (Portugal) Rony Lopes
- (Portugal) Carlos Mané
- (Portugal) Bernardo Silva
- (Portugal) Leandro Silva
- (Serbia) Uroš Đurđević
- (Serbia) Mijat Gaćinović
- (Serbia) Dejan Meleg
- (Serbia) Aleksandar Mitrović
- (Serbia) Marko Pavlovski
- (Spain) José Rodríguez
- (Spain) Álvaro Vadillo
- (Spain) Fede Vico
- (Turkey) Enver Cenk Şahin
- (Turkey) İbrahim Yılmaz

Own goals

- (Lithuania) Džiugas Petrauskas (against Portugal)

== Awards ==
- Golden Player: (Serbia) Aleksandar Mitrović
- Golden Boot: (Lithuania) Gratas Sirgėdas, Anass Achahbar, Alexandre Guedes

Name	Goals Scored	Assists	Minutes played
(Lithuania) Gratas Sirgėdas	3	0	141
(Netherlands) Anass Achahbar	3	0	255
(Portugal) Alexandre Guedes	3	0	390

=== Team of the Tournament ===
After the final, the UEFA technical team selected 23 players to integrate the "team of the tournament".

Goalkeepers

- (Georgia (country)) Bacho Mikava
- (Serbia) Predrag Rajković
- (Spain) Alfonso Herrero

Defenders

- (France) Antoine Conte
- (France) Aymeric Laporte
- (Portugal) Tobias Figueiredo
- (Portugal) Rafa
- (Serbia) Miloš Veljković
- (Spain) Héctor Bellerín
- (Spain) Borja López

Midfielders

- (France) Anthony Martial
- (France) Adrien Rabiot
- (Netherlands) Bilal Başaçıkoğlu
- (Netherlands) Rai Vloet
- (Portugal) Bernardo Silva
- (Serbia) Marko Pavlovski
- (Spain) José Rodríguez
- (Spain) Álvaro Vadillo
- (Turkey) Recep Niyaz

Forwards

- (France) Yassine Benzia
- (Lithuania) Gratas Sirgėdas
- (Portugal) Hélder Costa
- (Serbia) Aleksandar Mitrović
