= Eduardo Conget =

Spanish footballer

Personal information
- Full name: Eduardo Conget Salvatierra
- Date of birth: 22 June 1977 (age 49)
- Place of birth: Tudela, Spain
- Height: 1.78 m (5 ft 10 in)
- Position: Midfielder

Youth career
- Osasuna

Senior career*
Years	Team	Apps	(Gls)
1995–1999	Osasuna B	101	(5)
1998–1999	Osasuna	4	(0)
1999–2001	Ourense	60	(11)
2001–2002	Burgos	30	(0)
2002	Gimnàstic	12	(0)
2003–2004	Ourense	48	(5)
2004–2006	Cartagena	54	(4)
2006–2008	Puertollano	57	(7)
2008–2009	Melilla	28	(1)
2009–2012	Izarra	?	(19)
Total		394	(52)
- * Club domestic league appearances and goals

Eduardo Conget Salvatierra (born 22 June 1977 in Tudela, Navarre) is a Spanish retired footballer who played as a midfielder.
