= Gratas Sirgėdas =

Lithuanian footballer

Personal information
- Full name: Gratas Sirgėdas
- Date of birth: 17 December 1994 (age 31)
- Place of birth: Panevėžys, Lithuania
- Position: Midfielder

Team information
- Current team: Kauno Žalgiris
- Number: 10

Youth career
- Panevėžys Football Academy
- –2013: National Football Academy

Senior career*
| Years | Team | Apps | (Gls) |
| –2013 | National Football Academy | | (5) |
| 2013–2015 | VfB Stuttgart II | 6 | (0) |
| 2015–2016 | Stuttgarter Kickers | 1 | (0) |
| 2016–2017 | FC Amberg | 13 | (3) |
| 2017–2018 | Kauno Žalgiris | 29 | (5) |
| 2017 | Kauno Žalgiris B | 1 | (1) |
| 2019 | Sūduva | 5 | (0) |
| 2020– | Kauno Žalgiris | 175 | (27) |

International career^{‡}
| 2010–2011 | Lithuania U17 | 8 | (0) |
| 2011–2012 | Lithuania U18 | 8 | (3) |
| 2012–2013 | Lithuania U19 | 10 | (3) |
| 2013– | Lithuania U21 | 2 | (0) |
| 2013– | Lithuania | 27 | (3) |
- * Club domestic league appearances and goals as of 20 July 2026 ‡ National team caps and goals as of 11:00, 14 November 2025 (UTC)

Gratas Sirgėdas (born 17 December 1994) is a Lithuanian professional footballer who plays as a midfielder for Toplyga club Kauno Žalgiris.

== Club career ==
Sirgėdas scored five goals for the National Football Academy in the I Lyga. On 20 August 2013, he moved to VfB Stuttgart II.

Sirgėdas returned to Lithuania in August 2017, signing a contract with A Lyga side Kauno Žalgiris.

In December 2018, he signed with Sūduva.

On 16 January 2020, Kauno Žalgiris announced that Sirgėdas would be rejoining them.

== International career ==
Sirgėdas made his debut for the Lithuania national senior team on 10 September 2013 in a 2014 FIFA World Cup qualification match against Liechtenstein.

== Career statistics ==
=== International ===
Scores and results list Lithuania's goal tally first, score column indicates score after each Sirgėdas goal.

List of international goals scored by Gratas Sirgėdas
| No. | Date | Venue | Opponent | Score | Result | Competition |
|---|---|---|---|---|---|---|
| 1 | 7 October 2020 | A. Le Coq Arena, Tallinn, Estonia | Estonia | 2–0 | 3–1 | Friendly |
| 2 | 11 November 2020 | LFF Stadium, Vilnius, Lithuania | Faroe Islands | 1–0 | 2–0 | Friendly |
| 3 | 11 November 2020 | LFF Stadium, Vilnius, Lithuania | Faroe Islands | 2–0 | 2–0 | Friendly |

== Honours ==
Kauno Žalgiris

- Toplyga: 2025, 2026
- Lithuanian Cup: 2026
- Lithuanian Supercup: 2026

Individual

- UEFA European Under-19 Championship Golden Boot: 2013
- UEFA European Under-19 Championship Team of the Tournament: 2013
