= CD Izarra =

Spanish football team

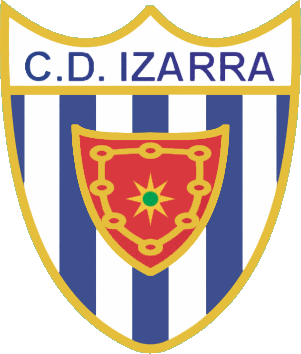
- Full name: Club Deportivo Izarra
- Founded: 1924
- Ground: Merkatondoa, Estella, Navarre, Spain
- Capacity: 3,500
- President: (Spain) Alfonso Canela
- Head coach: (Spain) Andoni Alonso
- League: Tercera Federación – Group 15
- 2025–26: Tercera Federación – Group 15, 3rd of 18
Home colours	Away colours

Club Deportivo Izarra is a Spanish football team, based in Estella-Lizarra, in the autonomous community of Navarre. Founded in 1924 it plays in Tercera Federación – Group 15, holding home matches at Estadio Merkatondoa, with a capacity of 3,500 seats.

== History ==
In the 1920s several clubs appeared in the town of Estella; The Sport Club Estellés, C.D. Iberia, Unión Deportiva Estellesa and C.D. La Estrella which they faced together with soldiers of the Military Orders disputing local tournaments.

Finally, the C.D Izarra appeared. The club was founded on January 6, 1924, and joined the other teams in the tournament dispute. In 1943 its first ascent to Tercera Division takes place. After several decades playing between national and regional division. From the season 1983/84 it consolidated in Third Division, it came second in 1984/85 and in 1989/90 was champion of the group and managed to ascend to Segunda Division B. It managed to stay in Segunda Division B for 8 seasons during the 1990s. It descended again to Third Division in 1999/2000. After irregular seasons, it twice become champion of group 15 of the Third Division. From season 2009/10 it returned to play in Segunda Division B. That season was not successful as the club finished 18th and returned to Tercera.
Another step for Segunda Division B, in 2012 and as of 2015, the team sits again in the bronze category of Spanish football for six consecutive seasons.

== Season to season ==
Season	Tier	Division	Place	Copa del Rey
1928–29	4	1ª Reg.	3rd	
1929–36	—	Regional	—	
1939–40	4	1ª Reg.	4th	
1940–41	4	1ª Reg.	4th	
1941–42	3	1ª Reg.	4th	
1942–43	3	1ª Reg.	3rd	
1943–44	3	3ª	9th	First round
1944–45	3	3ª	10th	
1945–46	3	3ª	9th	
1946–47	3	3ª	10th	
1947–48	3	3ª	13th	Second round
1948–49	4	1ª Reg.	4th	
1949–50	3	3ª	15th	
1950–51	3	3ª	7th	
1951–52	3	3ª	11th	
1952–53	3	3ª	8th	
1953–54	3	3ª	17th	
1954–55	3	3ª	7th	
1955–56	3	3ª	10th	
1956–57	4	1ª Reg.	1st	

Season	Tier	Division	Place	Copa del Rey
1957–58	3	3ª	17th	
1958–59	4	1ª Reg.	4th	
1959–60	4	1ª Reg.	1st	
1960–61	3	3ª	16th	
1961–62	4	1ª Reg.	2nd	
1962–63	4	1ª Reg.	7th	
1963–64	4	1ª Reg.	2nd	
1964–65	4	1ª Reg.	5th	
1965–66	4	1ª Reg.	6th	
1966–67	4	1ª Reg.	6th	
1967–68	4	1ª Reg.	1st	
1968–69	4	1ª Reg.	13th	
1969–70	4	1ª Reg.	9th	
1970–71	4	1ª Reg.	13th	
1971–72	4	1ª Reg.	7th	
1972–73	4	1ª Reg.	9th	
1973–74	4	Reg. Pref.	13th	
1974–75	4	Reg. Pref.	6th	
1975–76	4	Reg. Pref.	3rd	
1976–77	4	Reg. Pref.	3rd	

Season	Tier	Division	Place	Copa del Rey
1977–78	4	3ª	20th	
1978–79	5	Reg. Pref.	4th	
1979–80	5	Reg. Pref.	5th	
1980–81	5	Reg. Pref.	5th	
1981–82	5	Reg. Pref.	13th	
1982–83	5	Reg. Pref.	1st	
1983–84	4	3ª	14th	
1984–85	4	3ª	2nd	
1985–86	4	3ª	10th	First round
1986–87	4	3ª	7th	
1987–88	4	3ª	14th	
1988–89	4	3ª	8th	
1989–90	4	3ª	1st	
1990–91	3	2ª B	16th	Third round
1991–92	4	3ª	2nd	First round
1992–93	3	2ª B	6th	Second round
1993–94	3	2ª B	12th	Third round
1994–95	3	2ª B	7th	
1995–96	3	2ª B	12th	
1996–97	3	2ª B	6th	

Season	Tier	Division	Place	Copa del Rey
1997–98	3	2ª B	19th	
1998–99	4	3ª	3rd	
1999–2000	3	2ª B	20th	Prelim. round
2000–01	4	3ª	4th	
2001–02	4	3ª	12th	
2002–03	4	3ª	9th	
2003–04	4	3ª	9th	
2004–05	4	3ª	17th	
2005–06	5	Reg. Pref.	1st	
2006–07	4	3ª	5th	
2007–08	4	3ª	1st	
2008–09	4	3ª	1st	First round
2009–10	3	2ª B	18th	First round
2010–11	4	3ª	2nd	
2011–12	4	3ª	2nd	
2012–13	3	2ª B	20th	
2013–14	4	3ª	1st	
2014–15	4	3ª	3rd	Third round
2015–16	3	2ª B	12th	
2016–17	3	2ª B	13th	

Season	Tier	Division	Place	Copa del Rey
2017–18	3	2ª B	16th	
2018–19	3	2ª B	13th	
2019–20	3	2ª B	19th	
2020–21	3	2ª B	9th / 3rd	
2021–22	4	2ª RFEF	10th	
2022–23	4	2ª Fed.	10th	
2023–24	4	2ª Fed.	13th	
2024–25	4	2ª Fed.	18th	
2025–26	5	3ª Fed.	3rd	
2026–27	5	3ª Fed.		

- 16 seasons in Segunda División B
- 4 seasons in Segunda Federación/Segunda División RFEF
- 36 seasons in Tercera División
- 2 seasons in Tercera Federación

== Honours ==
- Tercera División: 1989–90, 2007–08, 2008–09, 2013–14
- Regional Championships: 1956–57, 1959–60, 1967–68, 1982–83, 2005–06

== Current squad ==
As of 5 February 2024

Note: Flags indicate national team as defined under FIFA eligibility rules; some limited exceptions apply. Players may hold more than one non-FIFA nationality.

No.	Pos.	Nation	Player
1	GK	ESP	Ángel Fraga
2	DF	ESP	Eneko Martínez (captain)
3	DF	ESP	Endika Irigoyen
4	DF	ESP	Karlos Mahugo
5	DF	ESP	Oier Ayerdi
6	DF	ESP	Marcos Isla
7	FW	ESP	Iván Martínez (on loan from Tudelano)
8	MF	ESP	José Hualde
9	FW	ESP	Julen Madariaga
10	MF	ESP	Javier Albín
11	FW	COL	Mauri Rivera

No.	Pos.	Nation	Player
12	MF	ESP	Martín Bengoa
13	GK	SVK	Viliam Hynek
14	MF	ESP	Mikel Arbeloa
15	DF	ESP	Urko Ardanaz
16	MF	ESP	Cristian Sanz
17	FW	ESP	Fermín Merchan "Perdi"
18	FW	ESP	Gorka Laborda
19	MF	ESP	Javi Gómez
20	MF	ESP	Rúper
22	DF	ESP	Dani Rodriguez

== Notable players ==
Note: this list includes players that have played at least 100 league games and/or have reached international status.

- (Spain) Juan Arza (youth)
- (Spain) Carlos Gurpegui (youth)
- (Spain) Javi Martínez (youth)
- (Spain) José Javier Basarte
- (Spain) Enrique Jurío
- (Spain) Jorge Barbarín
- (Spain) Eugenio Bustingorri
- (Spain) Roberto Toledo
- (Spain) José Javier Belloso
- (Spain) Jorge Barrena
- (Spain) Eduardo Conget
- (Spain) José Javier Etxarri
- (Spain) Sergio Valencia
- (Spain) Iñaki Casado
- (Spain) Alex Guembe
- (Spain) David Lizoain
- (Spain) Alejandro Palacios
- (Spain) Mikel Ziganda
- (Spain) Ibai Ardanaz
- (Canada) Samuel Piette
- (Spain) Bruno Araiz
- (Spain) Pito Camacho
- (Spain) Javier Briñol
- (Spain) Alex Maestresalas
- (Spain) Alex Cacho
- (Spain) Juan Antonio Cabrera
- (Spain) Eneko Martínez
- (Spain) Alex Hinojosa
- (Spain) Aritz Eguaras
- (Spain) Gorka Laborda
- (Spain) Julio Iricibar
- (Spain) Yoel Sola
