= Iker Hernández =

Spanish footballer

Personal information
- Full name: Iker Hernández Ezkerro
- Date of birth: 8 April 1994 (age 32)
- Place of birth: Urnieta, Spain
- Height: 1.81 m (5 ft 11 1/2 in)
- Position: Striker

Team information
- Current team: Palencia

Youth career
- 2004–2008: Antiguoko
- 2008–2011: Real Sociedad

Senior career*
Years	Team	Apps	(Gls)
2011–2015	Real Sociedad B	107	(25)
2014–2016	Real Sociedad	1	(0)
2015–2016	→ Barakaldo (loan)	35	(5)
2016–2017	Bilbao Athletic	15	(0)
2017–2018	Burgos	38	(5)
2018	Den Bosch	4	(0)
2019	Bolívar	0	(0)
2019	→ San José (loan)	39	(9)
2020–2021	Royal Pari	25	(6)
2021–2022	Melilla	47	(10)
2022	Santiago Wanderers	10	(1)
2023	Ibiza Islas Pitiusas	17	(1)
2023	Vestri	11	(2)
2024	Calahorra	16	(5)
2024–2025	Izarra	33	(7)
2025–	Palencia	10	(4)

International career
2009–2010	Spain U17	8	(6)
2012	Spain U18	2	(1)
2013	Spain U19	6	(2)
2012	Spain U20	5	(0)
- * Club domestic league appearances and goals as of 8 November 2025

Iker Hernández Ezkerro (born 8 April 1994) is a Spanish professional footballer who plays for Tercera Federación club Palencia as a striker. Besides Spain, he has played in the Netherlands, Bolivia, Chile and Iceland.

== Club career ==
Born in Urnieta, Gipuzkoa, Basque Country, Hernández graduated from Real Sociedad's youth system. On 30 June 2011 he signed his first professional deal, running until 2016.

Hernández made his debut as a senior on 26 November 2011, appearing with the reserves in a 0–3 home loss against SD Ponferradina in the Segunda División B championship. On 10 June of the following year he was definitely promoted to the B-team, and went on to appear regularly for the side in the following campaigns.

On 17 December Hernández made his first team debut, replacing Alfreð Finnbogason in a 2–0 home win against Real Oviedo, for the campaign's Copa del Rey. He made his La Liga debut four days later, again from the bench in a 1–1 away draw against Levante UD.

On 14 August 2015 Hernández was loaned to Barakaldo CF, in a season-long deal. On 1 July of the following year he signed for another reserve team, Bilbao Athletic also in the third division.

On 31 August 2018, after a one-season spell at Burgos CF, Hernández moved abroad for the first time in his career and joined Eerste Divisie side FC Den Bosch.

Hernández signed with Bolivian club Bolívar on 31 January 2018. After only one month in his new club, he was loaned out to San José because he didn't impress the coach at Bolívar. In January 2020, he moved to fellow league club Royal Pari.

On 28 January 2021. Hernández returned to Spain and joined to UD Melilla on Segunda División B.

On 23 June 2022, Hernández joined Santiago Wanderers in the Primera B de Chile, his fourth experience playing for a South American club after Bolívar, San José and Royal Pari in Bolivia.
