= Michele Moroni =

Italian footballer

Personal information
- Date of birth: 23 August 1994 (age 32)
- Place of birth: Parma, Italy
- Height: 1.78 m (5 ft 10 in)
- Position: Midfielder

Team information
- Current team: Fiorenzuola

Youth career
- –2013: Parma
- 2011–2012: → Crociati Noceto (loan)

Senior career*
Years	Team	Apps	(Gls)
2013–2015	Parma	0	(0)
2013–2014	→ Gubbio (loan)	14	(1)
2014–2015	→ Cremonese (loan)	22	(0)
2015–2018	Cremonese	1	(0)
2017	→ Maceratese (loan)	3	(0)
2017–2018	→ Santarcangelo (loan)	19	(2)
2018–2019	Santarcangelo	24	(3)
2019–2020	Cattolica San Marino	8	(0)
2020	Borgo San Donnino		
2020–	Fiorenzuola	0	(0)

International career
2013	Italy U-19	4	(2)
2013	Italy U-20	3	(0)
- * Club domestic league appearances and goals as of 18:08, 12 October 2020 (UTC)

Michele Moroni (born 23 August 1994) is an Italian football player. He plays for Serie D club Fiorenzuola.

== Club career ==
He made his Serie C debut for Gubbio on 8 September 2013 in a game against Perugia.

On 17 August 2018, Santarcangelo announced that Moroni will join them in Serie D on permanent basis, after playing for them in the previous Serie C season on loan.

In January 2020, Moroni moved to Borgo San Donnino FC. He then joined U.S. Fiorenzuola 1922 S.S. in August 2020.
