= Okan Deniz =

Turkish footballer

Personal information
- Date of birth: 20 May 1994 (age 32)
- Place of birth: Korkut, Muş, Turkey
- Height: 1.74 m (5 ft 9 in)
- Position: Winger

Team information
- Current team: İnegölspor
- Number: 77

Youth career
- 2007–2010: Bursaspor

Senior career*
Years	Team	Apps	(Gls)
2010–2014	Bursaspor A2	36	(21)
2011–2014	Bursaspor	10	(0)
2014	→ Balıkesirspor (loan)	6	(0)
2014–2015	İnegölspor	36	(4)
2015–2017	Pendikspor	49	(9)
2017–2019	İnegölspor	33	(8)
2019–2020	Osmanlıspor	31	(1)
2020–2021	Sarıyer	35	(6)
2021–2023	Amed	64	(5)
2023–	İnegölspor	3	(0)

International career
2010	Turkey U16	8	(2)
2010–2011	Turkey U17	10	(4)
2011	Turkey U18	1	(0)
2012–2013	Turkey U19	5	(4)
2012	Turkey U20	4	(1)
2012	Turkey U21	1	(0)
- * Club domestic league appearances and goals as of 1 October 2023

Okan Deniz (born 20 May 1994) is a Turkish footballer who plays as a winger for İnegölspor.

Deniz began his career with Bursaspor in 2007 and made his professional debut during the 2011-12 season. Deniz is also a youth international with caps at the under-16, 17 and 18 levels.

== International career ==
Deniz represented Turkey at the 2013 UEFA European Under-19 Championship.

== Personal life ==
Deniz is one of ten children. His footballing idol is Didier Drogba.
