= Marko Pavlovski =

Serbian footballer

Personal information
- Date of birth: 7 February 1994 (age 32)
- Place of birth: Belgrade, FR Yugoslavia
- Height: 1.74 m (5 ft 8 1/2 in)
- Position: Attacking midfielder

Youth career
- 2004–2006: Radnički Jugopetrol
- 2006–2011: OFK Beograd

Senior career*
Years	Team	Apps	(Gls)
2011–2013	OFK Beograd	31	(3)
2013–2017	Apollon Limassol	0	(0)
2013–2015	→ Porto B (loan)	30	(2)
2015	→ Mouscron-Péruwelz (loan)	3	(0)
2016	→ OFK Beograd (loan)	9	(1)
2016–2017	→ RNK Split (loan)	24	(1)
2017–2018	Voždovac	9	(0)
2018–2019	Varzim	28	(1)
2020	Dinamo Minsk	13	(0)
2021	Riteriai	34	(5)
2022	Sūduva	31	(0)
2023	Budućnost	15	(1)
2024	Aksu	0	(0)
2024–2025	Ararat Yerevan	0	(0)
2025	DFK Dainava	12	(1)

International career
2011–2013	Serbia U19	19	(6)
2015	Serbia U21	2	(0)
Medal record
Gold medal – first place	UEFA Under-19 Championship	2013
- * Club domestic league appearances and goals as of 12 January 2026

Marko Pavlovski (Serbian Cyrillic: Марко Павловски, born 7 February 1994) is a Serbian professional footballer who plays as an attacking midfielder for DFK Dainava.

== Club career ==
Born in Belgrade, he played with the youth team of OFK Beograd until the season 2010–11 when he made his debut for the main team in the SuperLiga. On 29 August 2013, it was announced that Pavlovski signed for FC Porto on a one-year loan, with the Portuguese side having an option to buy out Pavlovski afterwards. His rights were in fact purchased by Apollon Limassol, who proceeded to loan him out to other clubs.

In August 2024, he was about to sign a contract with the Indonesian club PSMS Medan, but the deal was not completed.

== International career ==
Marko Pavlovski has been member of the Serbian U19 team since 2011 and was a member of the Serbian squad at the 2012 UEFA European Under-19 Football Championship.

On 25 May 2013, Pavlovski received a call from Čedomir Janevski to represent Macedonia national football team in the friendly matches to be played on 3 and 11 June against Sweden and Norway respectively. He did not respond to this invitation. Months later, Pavlovski captained the Serbia U19 team that won the 2013 UEFA European Under-19 Championship.

== Career statistics ==
=== Club ===
As of 15 March 2023.

Appearances and goals by club, season and competition
Club	Season	League			Cup		Continent		Total	
Club	Season	Division	Apps	Goals	Apps	Goals	Apps	Goals	Apps	Goals
OFK Beograd	2010–11	Serbian SuperLiga	1	0	0	0	0	0	1	0
OFK Beograd	2011–12	Serbian SuperLiga	14	0	2	0	0	0	16	0
OFK Beograd	2012–13	Serbian SuperLiga	13	3	1	0	0	0	14	3
OFK Beograd	2013–14	Serbian SuperLiga	3	0	0	0	0	0	3	0
OFK Beograd	Total		31	3	3	0	0	0	34	3
Apollon Limassol FC	2013–14	Cypriot First Division	0	0	0	0	0	0	0	0
Apollon Limassol FC	Total		0	0	0	0	0	0	0	0
FC Porto B (loan)	2013–14	Segunda Liga	8	0	0	0	0	0	8	0
FC Porto B (loan)	2014–15	Segunda Liga	22	2	0	0	0	0	22	2
FC Porto B (loan)	Total		22	2	0	0	0	0	30	2
Royal Excel Mouscron (loan)	2015–16	Belgian Pro League	3	0	1	0	0	0	4	0
Royal Excel Mouscron (loan)	Total		3	0	1	0	0	0	4	0
OFK Beograd (loan)	2015–16	Serbian SuperLiga	9	1	1	0	0	0	10	1
OFK Beograd (loan)	Total		9	1	1	0	0	0	10	1
RNK Split	2016–17	Croatian First Football League	24	1	3	0	0	0	27	1
RNK Split	Total		24	1	3	0	0	0	27	1
FK Voždovac	2017–18	Serbian SuperLiga	9	0	1	0	0	0	10	0
FK Voždovac	Total		9	0	1	0	0	0	10	0
Varzim S.C.	2018–19	LigaPro	27	1	2	0	0	0	29	1
Varzim S.C.	2019–20	LigaPro	1	0	1	0	0	0	2	0
Varzim S.C.	Total		28	1	3	0	0	0	31	1
FC Dinamo Minsk	2020	Belarusian Premier League	13	0	2	0	0	0	15	0
FC Dinamo Minsk	Total		13	0	2	0	0	0	15	0
FK Riteriai	2021	A Lyga	34	5	1	0	0	0	35	5
FK Riteriai	Total		34	5	1	0	0	0	35	5
FK Sūduva	2022	A Lyga	31	0	4	0	2	0	37	0
FK Sūduva	Total		31	0	4	0	2	0	37	0
FK Budućnost Podgorica	2022–23	Montenegrin First League	14	1	0	0	0	0	14	1
FK Budućnost Podgorica	2023–24	Montenegrin First League	1	0	0	0	3	0	4	0
FK Budućnost Podgorica	Total		15	1	0	0	3	0	18	1
Career total			0	0	0	0	0	0	0	0

== Honours ==
=== International ===
Serbia U-19

- UEFA European U-19 Championship: 2013

Super Cup - Suduva 2022

Super Cup - FC Porto 2014

=== Individual ===
- UEFA European Under-19 Championship Team of the Tournament: 2013

Best XI in Alyga 2021

Most valuables XI in Alyga 2022
