= Georgia national under-19 football team =

National youth association football team

Georgia Under-19
- Nickname: ჯვაროსნები Jvarosnebi (Crusaders)
- Association: Georgian Football Federation
- Confederation: UEFA
- Head coach: Zurab Khizanishvili
- Home stadium: Various
- FIFA code: GEO
First colours	Second colours

First international
- Israel 0–1 Georgia (Georgia (country)) (Tel Aviv, 16 November 1993)

Biggest win
- Estonia 1–8 Georgia (Georgia (country)) (Tallinn, 12 October 2003) (Georgia (country)) Georgia 7–0 Liechtenstein (Tbilisi, 14 November 2018)

Biggest defeat
- (Georgia (country)) Georgia 0–6 Turkey (Dubnica, 19 May 2006); England 6–0 Georgia (Georgia (country)) (Hjørring, 24 September 2022)

UEFA European Under-19 Football Championship
- Appearances: 3 (first in 1999)
- Best result: Group stage (1999, 2013, 2017)

FIFA U-20 World Cup
- Appearances: 1 (first in 2029)

The Georgia national under-19 football team is the national under-19 football team of Georgia and is controlled by the Football Federation, the governing body for football in Georgia. Primarily, it competes to qualify for the annual UEFA European Under-19 Championship.

Zurab Khizanishvili took charge of the team in December 2025.

In 2029, Georgia will co-host the FIFA U-20 World Cup along with Armenia, marking their first time taking part in the tournament. The team also earned an automatic qualification as co-host.

== Competitive record ==
=== FIFA U-20 World Cup ===
FIFA U-20 World Cup record
Year	Result	Pld	W	D	L	GF	GA	Squad
(Tunisia) 1977	Part of Soviet Union							
(Japan) 1979	Part of Soviet Union							
(Australia) 1981	Part of Soviet Union							
(Mexico) 1983	Part of Soviet Union							
(Soviet Union) 1985	Part of Soviet Union							
(Chile) 1987	Part of Soviet Union							
(Saudi Arabia) 1989	Part of Soviet Union							
(Portugal) 1991	Part of Soviet Union							
(Australia) 1993	Did not qualify							
(Qatar) 1995	Did not qualify							
(Malaysia) 1997	Did not qualify							
(Nigeria) 1999	Did not qualify							
(Argentina) 2001	Did not qualify							
(United Arab Emirates) 2003	Did not qualify							
(Netherlands) 2005	Did not qualify							
(Canada) 2007	Did not qualify							
(Egypt) 2009	Did not qualify							
(Colombia) 2011	Did not qualify							
(Turkey) 2013	Did not qualify							
(New Zealand) 2015	Did not qualify							
(South Korea) 2017	Did not qualify							
(Poland) 2019	Did not qualify							
(Argentina) 2023	Did not qualify							
(Chile) 2025	Did not qualify							
(Azerbaijan) (Uzbekistan) 2027	Did not qualify							
(Armenia) (Georgia (country)) 2029	Qualified as co-host							
Total	TBD	—	—	—	—	—	—	—

=== UEFA European Under-19 Championship ===
Year	Round	W	D	L	GS	GA	Players
(Sweden) 1999	Group Stage	0	1	2	4	9	–
(Lithuania) 2013	Group Stage	0	1	2	2	5	Squad
(Georgia (country)) 2017	Group Stage	1	0	2	2	4	Squad

=== UEFA European Under-19 Championship Qualifying Rounds ===
Year	Round	GP	W	D	L	GS	GA
(Norway) 2002	First Round	3	0	1	1	2	5
(Liechtenstein) 2003	First Round	**3**	**2**	**0**	**1**	**4**	**1**
(Switzerland) 2004	First Round	3	1	0	2	8	5
(Northern Ireland) 2005	First Round	3	1	1	1	7	6
(Poland) 2006	First and Elite Rounds	6	3	1	2	10	14
(Austria) 2007	First and Elite Rounds	6	2	2	2	6	8
(Czech Republic) 2008	First Round	3	0	0	3	1	5
(Ukraine) 2009	First Round	3	0	1	2	2	3
(France) 2010	First round	3	0	2	1	1	2
(Romania) 2011	First round	3	0	1	2	1	6
(Estonia) 2012	First and Elite Rounds	**6**	**4**	**1**	**1**	**13**	**8**
(Lithuania) 2013	First and Elite Rounds	6	3	2	1	9	5
(Hungary) 2014	First and Elite Rounds	6	5	0	1	16	4
(Greece) 2015	First Round	3	2	0	1	6	4
(Germany) 2016	First Round	3	1	1	1	3	3
(Georgia (country)) 2017	Qualified as hosts						
(Finland) 2018	First Round	3	0	2	1	2	3
(Armenia) 2019	First Round	3	1	1	1	9	3
2020 and 2021 were cancelled due to COVID-19 pandemic
(Slovakia) 2022	First and Elite rounds	6	3	0	3	5	6
(Malta) 2023	First Round	3	0	0	3	2	12
(Northern Ireland) 2024	First and Elite rounds	6	3	0	3	7	13
(Romania) 2025	First and Elite rounds	6	2	1	3	8	11
(Wales) 2026	First round	3	1	0	2	2	5
(Czech Republic) 2027	Two rounds, League B	5	1	1	3	6	12

Notes:

- **Bold** indicates qualification for the championship.

== Fixtures and results 2025–26 season ==
Win Draw Loss Fixture

=== 2027 UEFA European Championship qualifiers, League B ===
3 June 2026	Montenegro	1–1	Georgia	Davit Petriashvili Arena, Tbilisi
	Vukoje 58'	Report	Bartishvili 56' (pen.)	Referee: Joakim Sars (Sweden)

9 June 2026	Georgia	2–3	Iceland	Davit Petriashvili Arena, Tbilisi
	Kharebashvili 86'; Bartishvili 90+6'	Report	Karason 52'; Arnarsson 90+3'; Gurnarsson 90+8'	Referee: Karl Koppel (Estonia)

11 November 2026	Georgia	2–5	Denmark	Dogana
	Mikautadze 40'; Shatirishvili 68'	Report	Bunten 7'; Ambæk 9'; Faber 34'; Shatirishvili 50' o.g; Gammelgaard 56'	Stadium: Stadio Ezio Conti di Dogana; Referee: Alexandros Tsakalidis (Greece)

14 November 2026	Bosnia and Herzegovina	3–0	Georgia	Dogana
	Nišić 48', 70' (pen.); Mustafić 50'	Report		Referee: Alexandros Tsakalidis (Greece)

17 November 2026	San Marino	0–1	Georgia	Dogana
		Report	Zavoli 26' o.g	Referee: Bulat Sariyev (Kazakhstan)

=== Friendlies ===
6 June 2025	Moldova	2–1	Georgia	Nisporeni stadium, Nisporeni
20:30	Bulmaga 90+3'; Sava 90+5'	Report	Gvasalia 45'

8 June 2025	Georgia	0–0	Moldova U20	Stadionul CPSM, Vadul lui Vodă
18:30		Report

10 June 2025	Georgia	4–0	Armenia	Chișinău
18:30	Chikovani 5', 20'; Gogilashvili 29', 32'	Report

7 September 2025	Georgia	0–0	Greece	Davit Petriashvili Arena, Tbilisi
19:00		Report

9 September 2025	Georgia	0–0	Greece	Davit Petriashvili Arena, Tbilisi
19:00		Report

10 October 2025	Bosnia and Herzegovina	2–1	Georgia	Zenica
18:00	Dimitric 46' Gojak 70'	Report	Elisashvili 26' (pen.)

12 October 2025	Bosnia and Herzegovina	1–3	Georgia	Zenica
17:00	Savic 47'	Report	Doltmurziev 49'; Murvanidze 57'; Danelia 82'

28 March 2026	Georgia	6–2	Kazakhstan Kazakhstan U18	Mikheil Meskhi reserve stadium, Tbilisi
16:00	Shalikiani; Bendeliani; Berikashvili; Chkhetiani ((pen.)); Nebulishvili; Diakonidze		Arturuly; Arakelyants

30 March 2026	Georgia	0–2	Kazakhstan Kazakhstan U18	Mikheil Meskhi reserve stadium, Tbilisi
14:00			Makhmudov; Valikhan

2 October 2026	Georgia	2–2	Latvia	Davit Petriashvili Arena, Tbilisi
18:00	Shatirishvili 5' Barikhashvili 21' (pen.)	Report	Menniks 25' Kuprava 73' (o.g.)

5 October 2026	Georgia	1–1	Latvia	Davit Petriashvili Arena, Tbilisi
18:00	Barikhashvili 57'	Report	Gomins 36'

== Current squad ==
The following players were called up for 2027 UEFA European Under-19 Championship League B Round 2 qualifying matches against Denmark, Bosnia and San Marino played respectively on 11, 14 and 17 November 2026 in San Marino.

No.	Pos.	Player	Date of birth (age)	Club
	GK	Mate Chelidze	18 April 2009 (age 17)	(Georgian Football Federation) Dinamo Tbilisi
	GK	Saba Asanidze	7 October 2008 (age 18)	(Georgian Football Federation) Locomotive
	DF	Saba Marsagishvili	27 June 2008 (age 18)	(Georgian Football Federation) Iberia 1999
	DF	Shotiko Diakonidze	18 May 2008 (age 18)	(Georgian Football Federation) Dinamo Tbilisi
	DF	Mate Shatirishvili	25 May 2008 (age 18)	(Georgian Football Federation) Samgurali
	DF	Giorgi Lomidze	17 February 2008 (age 18)	(Georgian Football Federation) Dinamo Tbilisi
	DF	Luka Kuprava	12 February 2008 (age 18)	(Georgian Football Federation) Torpedo Kutaisi
	DF	Luka Chabradze	1 September 2008 (age 18)	(Georgian Football Federation) Locomotive
	DF	Erekle Dzerkorashvili	3 January 2009 (age 17)	(Georgian Football Federation) Locomotive
	MF	Luka Tsikolia	3 February 2008 (age 18)	(Georgian Football Federation) Dinamo Tbilisi
	MF	Saba Avdoevi	31 August 2009 (age 17)	(Georgian Football Federation) Iberia 1999
	MF	Nikoloz Shalikiani	22 May 2008 (age 18)	(Georgian Football Federation) Iberia 1999
	MF	Koba Kakashvili	4 October 2008 (age 18)	(Georgian Football Federation) Dinamo Tbilisi
	MF	Giorgi Kobakhidze	30 July 2008 (age 18)	(Georgian Football Federation) Dila
	MF	Nikoloz Barikhashvili-Sheklashvili	20 June 2008 (age 18)	(Royal Spanish Football Federation) Atletico Osasuna
	MF	Nikoloz Aduashvili	28 May 2008 (age 18)	(Georgian Football Federation) Dinamo Tbilisi
	MF	Tornike Kvaratskhelia	7 February 2010 (age 16)	(Georgian Football Federation) Dinamo Tbilisi
	MF	Luka Gurchiani	18 May 2008 (age 18)	(Georgian Football Federation) Gagra
	FW	Sandro Mikautadze	3 June 2009 (age 17)	(Georgian Football Federation) Dinamo Tbilisi
	FW	Dato Melashvili	7 February 2007 (age 19)	(Georgian Football Federation) Locomotive

== Statistics ==
=== Players with most appearances ===
Last updated: 24 April 2026

#	Name	Career	Caps
1	Nikoloz Chikovani	2024–	17
1	Tsotne Berelidze	2023–2025	17
3	Saba Geguchadze	2023–2025	16
4	Saba Samushia	2023–2025	15

=== Topscorers ===
#	Name	Career	Caps
1	Giorgi Guliashvili	2018–2020	7
2	Valeri Qazaishvili	2010–2011	6
3	Zuriko Davitashvili	2017–2018	4
3	Giorgi Chanturia	2010–2012	4
3	Guram Goshteliani	2015–2018	4

Note: Official UEFA matches only

=== Record against opponents ===
As of 18 November 2026

Opponent	Matches	Wins	Draws	Losses	GF	GA
Albania	3	2	0	1	2	1
Andorra	1	0	1	0	1	1
Armenia	1	1	0	0	4	0
Australia	2	1	1	0	2	1
Azerbaijan	4	0	1	3	3	8
Belarus	4	1	1	2	4	5
Belgium	4	2	0	2	5	6
Bosnia and Herzegovina	6	2	0	4	9	11
Bulgaria	4	2	1	1	4	2
Croatia	4	2	0	3	4	7
Cyprus	6	3	3	0	11	3
Czech Republic	5	0	0	5	2	10
Denmark	4	0	1	3	5	13
England	4	0	1	3	3	13
Estonia	4	4	1	0	15	3
Faroe Islands	1	1	0	0	2	0
Finland	2	2	0	0	4	1
France	4	1	2	1	4	5
Germany	1	0	0	1	0	2
Gibraltar	1	1	0	0	1	0
Greece	2	1	0	1	2	2
Hungary	2	1	1	0	5	3
Iceland	3	1	1	1	5	4
Republic of Ireland	2	1	1	0	3	2
Israel	8	2	4	2	8	7
Italy	5	1	1	3	4	11
Kazakhstan	3	2	0	1	9	5
Kosovo	1	1	0	0	1	0
Latvia	6	1	3	2	8	9
Liechtenstein	1	1	0	0	7	0
Lithuania	6	3	2	1	11	5
Luxembourg	1	1	0	0	2	0
Malta	1	0	1	0	1	1
Moldova	3	2	0	1	5	3
Montenegro	6	1	2	4	6	12
Netherlands	3	1	0	2	3	4
North Macedonia	4	3	1	0	11	4
Northern Ireland	2	1	1	0	2	1
Norway	3	1	0	2	3	4
Poland	5	2	0	3	6	11
Portugal	8	0	1	7	3	19
Romania	3	1	0	2	4	9
Russia	3	3	0	0	3	0
San Marino	1	1	0	0	1	0
Scotland	3	2	0	1	7	5
Serbia	6	2	1	4	7	10
Slovakia	6	2	1	2	9	9
Slovenia	1	0	1	0	1	1
Spain	4	0	1	3	2	12
Sweden	3	2	1	0	4	2
Switzerland	3	2	1	0	5	2
Turkey	5	1	2	2	6	13
Ukraine	5	1	1	2	2	4
Wales	3	1	1	1	5	4

== Managerial history ==
- (Georgia (country)) Gela Gomelauri (2000–2001)
- (Georgia (country)) Otar Korgalidze (2002–2003)
- (Georgia (country)) Koba Zhorzhikashvili (2003–2004)
- (Georgia (country)) Vakhtang Kopaleishvili (2004–2005)
- (Georgia (country)) Koba Zhorzhikashvili (2005–2006)
- (Germany) Heinz Toppmöller (2006–2008)
- (Georgia (country)) Zaur Svanadze (2008–2009)
- (Georgia (country)) Gela Shekiladze (2009–2010)
- (Georgia (country)) Vladimer Gutsaev (2010–2011)
- (Georgia (country)) Giorgi Devdariani (2011–2012)
- (Georgia (country)) Otar Korgalidze (2012)
- (Georgia (country)) Kakha Kacharava (2012–2013)
- (Georgia (country)) Giorgi Tsetsadze (2013)
- (Georgia (country)) Vasil Maisuradze (2013–2014)
- (Georgia (country)) Giorgi Devdariani (2014–2015)
- (Georgia (country)) Vasil Maisuradze (2015–2016)
- (Georgia (country)) Giorgi Kipiani (2016–2017)
- (Georgia (country)) Giorgi Mikadze (2018)
- (Georgia (country)) Ramaz Svanadze (2019–2021)
- (Georgia (country)) Vasil Maisuradze (2021–2024)
- (Georgia (country)) Lasha Pirtskhalaishvili (2024–2025)
- (Georgia (country)) Vasil Maisuradze (2025)
