= Nika Kacharava =

Georgian football player (born 1994)

Personal information
- Full name: Nikoloz Kacharava
- Date of birth: 13 January 1994 (age 32)
- Place of birth: Nicosia, Cyprus
- Height: 1.98 m (6 ft 6 in)
- Position: Forward

Team information
- Current team: Bukhara
- Number: 9

Youth career
- 2011–2012: Dinamo Tbilisi
- 2012–2013: Gagra
- 2013–2014: Rubin Kazan

Senior career*
Years	Team	Apps	(Gls)
2014–2016	Tskhinvali	41	(25)
2016–2018	Rostov	0	(0)
2016–2017	→ Ethnikos Achna (loan)	27	(16)
2017–2018	→ Korona Kielce (loan)	26	(7)
2018–2022	Anorthosis Famagusta	51	(11)
2020–2021	→ Lech Poznań (loan)	7	(1)
2022	Jeonnam Dragons	10	(2)
2023	Torpedo Kutaisi	14	(3)
2023–2024	Panevėžys	17	(2)
2024–2025	Spartakos Kitiou	9	(2)
2025	Gagra	10	(0)
2025	Gareji	15	(3)
2026–	Bukhara	8	(0)

International career
2012–2013	Georgia U19	8	(2)
2013–2016	Georgia U21	10	(6)
2016–2020	Georgia	24	(3)
- * Club domestic league appearances and goals as of 28 July 2026

Nikoloz "Nika" Kacharava (Georgian: ნიკოლოზ "ნიკა" კაჭარავა, romanized: nik'oloz "nik'a" k'ach'arava, pronounced [nikʼoloz nikʼa kʼatʃʼaɾava]; born 13 January 1994) is a Georgian professional footballer who plays as a forward for Uzbekistan Super League club Bukhara. Born in Cyprus, he played for the Georgia national team.

== Club career ==
Kacharava started his career in the second team of Dinamo Tbilisi. A promising youth, he found it hard finding opportunities to break into the Tbilisi first team and signed a contract with Rubin Kazan. Kacharava played several matches with the Rubin Kazan youth squads, but found it hard to break into the first team squad. Kacharava got his first official contract with Rubin Kazan, but became frustrated with the lack of first team opportunities.

Kacharava moved back to Georgia and signed a contract with FC Tskhinvali. In his first season, Kacharava scored only one goal - however, in the following seasons Kacharava cemented his spot in the first team, becoming a prolific scorer and one of the top forwards in the league. He attracted attention throughout Europe, eventually transferring to Rostov during one of their most successful seasons.

He spent the 2016–17 season on loan in Cyprus at Ethnikos Achna, scoring 16 goals and becoming the third-best scorer of the 2016–17 Cypriot First Division.

On 18 June 2017, he signed another year-long loan deal, joining the Polish club Korona Kielce.

On 6 June 2018, Kacharava signed a two-year contract with the Cypriot club Anorthosis Famagusta. On 24 January 2020, he signed a two-year contract extension, with a buy-out clause of €500,000.

On 8 February 2022, Kacharava joined South Korean K League 2 club Jeonnam Dragons. A year later he returned to Georgia and moved to Torpedo Kutaisi, but left the club by mutual consent after three months.

In August 2023, Kacharava signed a contract with Lithuanian club Panevėžys until the end of the season with an option of its extension.

In July 2024, the newly promoted second-division Cypriot club, Spartakos Kitiou, announced the signing of Kacharava. In February 2025, he reunited with Gagra where he had spent a part of his youth career.

== International career ==
Kacharava was born in Cyprus to parents of Georgian descent – his father Kakhaber Kacharava was a member of the Georgia national team and his mother Lia Mikadze was a basketball player. Kacharava had successful stints with the Georgian youth national teams, and made his debut for the senior Georgian national team in a friendly 0–0 tie with Kazakhstan.

== Career statistics ==
=== Club ===
As of match played 28 July 2026

Appearances and goals by club, season and competition
Club	Season	League			National cup (Note: Includes Georgian Cup, Cypriot Cup, Polish Cup, Lithuanian Cup)		Continental		Other		Total	
Club	Season	Division	Apps	Goals	Apps	Goals	Apps	Goals	Apps	Goals	Apps	Goals
Tskhinvali	2013–14	Umaglesi Liga	1	0	0	0	—		—		1	0
Tskhinvali	2014–15	Umaglesi Liga	25	12	6	5	—		—		31	17
Tskhinvali	2015–16	Umaglesi Liga	15	13	2	1	2 (Note: Appearances in UEFA Europa League)	1	—		19	15
Tskhinvali	Total		41	25	8	6	2	1	—		51	32
Rostov	2015–16	Russian Premier League	0	0	0	0	—		—		0	0
Ethnikos Achna (loan)	2016–17	Cypriot First Division	27	16	2	0	—		—		29	16
Korona Kielce (loan)	2017–18	Ekstraklasa	26	7	3	2	—		—		29	9
Anorthosis Famagusta	2018–19	Cypriot First Division	23	4	3	2	1	0	—		27	6
Anorthosis Famagusta	2019–20	Cypriot First Division	18	6	3	0	—		—		21	6
Anorthosis Famagusta	2020–21	Cypriot First Division	2	0	0	0	0	0	—		2	0
Anorthosis Famagusta	2021–22	Cypriot First Division	8	1	—		5 (Note: Appearances in UEFA Europa Conference League)	0	—		13	1
Anorthosis Famagusta	Total		51	11	6	2	6	0	—		63	13
Lech Poznań (loan)	2020–21	Ekstraklasa	7	1	1	0	6	0	—		14	1
Jeonnam Dragons	2022	K League 2	10	2	0	0	5 (Note: Appearances in AFC Champions League)	1	—		15	3
Torpedo Kutaisi	2023	Erovnuli Liga	14	3	—		—		—		14	3
Panevėžys	2023	A Lyga	7	2	—		—		—		7	2
Panevėžys	2024	A Lyga	10	0	1	1	—		1 (Note: Appearance in Lithuanian Supercup)	0	12	1
Panevėžys	Total		17	2	1	1	0	0	1	0	19	3
Spartakos Kitiou	2024–25	Cypriot Second Division	7	2	—		—		—		7	2
Gagra	2025	Erovnuli Liga	10	0	0	0	—		—		10	0
Gareji Sagarejo	2025	Erovnuli Liga	15	3	0	0	—		—		15	3
Bukhara	2026	Uzbekistan Super League	8	0	0	0	—		—		8	0
Career total			233	72	21	11	19	2	1	0	274	85

=== International ===
Appearances and goals by national team and year
National team	Year	Apps	Goals
Georgia
Georgia	2016	3	0
Georgia	2017	6	1
Georgia	2018	7	0
Georgia	2019	1	0
Georgia	2020	7	2
Total		24	3

Scores and results list Georgia's goal tally first, score column indicates score after each Kacharava goal.

List of international goals scored by Nika Kacharava
No.	Date	Venue	Opponent	Score	Result	Competition
1	24 March 2017	Boris Paichadze Dinamo Arena, Tbilisi, Georgia	Serbia	1–0	1–3	2018 FIFA World Cup qualification
2	5 September 2020	A. Le Coq Arena, Tallinn, Estonia	Estonia	1–0	1–0	2020–21 UEFA Nations League C
3	11 October 2020	Stadion Miejski, Tychy, Poland	Armenia	1–1	2-2	2020–21 UEFA Nations League C

== Honours ==
Panevėžys

- A Lyga: 2023
- Lithuanian Supercup: 2024
