= Emir Alečković =

Bosnian football referee

- Full name: Emir Alečković
- Born: 14 August 1979 (age 47); SR Bosnia and Herzegovina, SFR Yugoslavia

Domestic
Years	League	Role

International
Years	League	Role
2010–	FIFA listed	Referee

Emir Alečković (born 14 August 1979) is a Bosnian international referee who refereed at 2014 FIFA World Cup qualifiers. He is the first referee from independent Bosnia and Herzegovina that has judged at a group stage of a European team competition, the UEFA Europa League game between PSV Eindhoven – AIK on 25 October 2012.
