= Andrija Luković =

Serbian footballer

Andrija Luković Андрија Луковић
Personal information
- Date of birth: 24 October 1994 (age 32)
- Place of birth: Belgrade, FR Yugoslavia
- Height: 1.89 m (6 ft 2 in)
- Position: Central midfielder

Team information
- Current team: Chania
- Number: 23

Youth career
- Red Star Belgrade
- Čukarički
- Rad

Senior career*
Years	Team	Apps	(Gls)
2012–2014	Rad	35	(5)
2012	→ BASK (loan)	3	(0)
2014–2016	PSV	0	(0)
2014–2016	Jong PSV	35	(1)
2016–2018	Red Star Belgrade	5	(0)
2017–2018	→ Voždovac (loan)	25	(9)
2018–2019	Voždovac	33	(7)
2019–2020	Raków Częstochowa	7	(0)
2020–2021	Famalicão	14	(1)
2021–2022	Belenenses SAD	18	(0)
2022–2024	Zira	35	(0)
2024	Radnički Niš	15	(0)
2024–2025	Napredak Kruševac	9	(1)
2025	Shanghai Jiading Huilong	13	(0)
2026–	Chania	4	(0)

International career
2013	Serbia U19	7	(3)
2015–2016	Serbia U21	4	(2)
Medal record
Men's football
Representing Serbia
UEFA European Under-19 Championship
Winner	2013 Lithuania
- * Club domestic league appearances and goals as of 21 April 2026

Andrija Luković (Serbian Cyrillic: Андрија Луковић; born 24 October 1994) is a Serbian professional footballer who plays as a central midfielder for Super League Greece 2 club Chania.

== Club career ==
=== Rad ===
Luković made his professional debut on 9 March 2013, in a match against Smederevo under coach Marko Nikolić at the age of 18. In November 2013, he went on trial with Anderlecht and played in a friendly against NAC Breda, after which it was announced that Anderlecht would consider signing Luković in the upcoming winter transfer window.

=== PSV ===
On 2 August 2014, Luković signed a three-year deal with Dutch Eredivisie side PSV Eindhoven.

=== Red Star Belgrade ===
On 21 June 2016, Luković signed a three-year deal with Red Star Belgrade.

=== Voždovac ===
On 30 August 2017, Luković joined Voždovac on a one season long loan.

=== Famalicão ===
On 5 August 2020, Luković joined Famalicão, at zero cost, by signing a three-year contract (ending at the end of the 2022–23 season, 30 June 2023) with the Portuguese club in the 2020–21 season.

=== Belenenses SAD ===
On 29 July 2021, he moved to Belenenses SAD.

== International career ==
In his first major international tournament, Luković scored a total of two goals in the 2013 UEFA European Under-19 Football Championship. He scored against Turkey U19 on 20 July 2013, and then scored the game-winning goal in the 2013 UEFA European U19 Final match against France U19.

== Honours ==
Serbia U19

- UEFA European Under-19 Championship: 2013
