= Anass Achahbar =

Dutch-Moroccan footballer (born 1994)

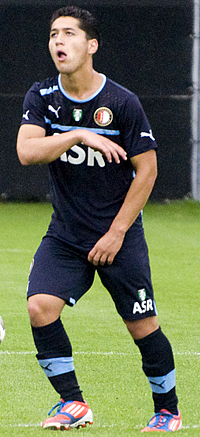
- Achahbar with Feyenoord in 2014

Personal information
- Date of birth: 13 January 1994 (age 32)
- Place of birth: The Hague, Netherlands
- Height: 1.73 m (5 ft 8 in)
- Positions: Attacking midfielder; forward

Team information
- Current team: Westlandia
- Number: 14

Youth career
- –2001: Kranenburg
- 2001–2002: VCS
- 2002–2011: Feyenoord

Senior career*
Years	Team	Apps	(Gls)
2011–2016	Feyenoord	33	(6)
2013–2014	→ Arminia Bielefeld (loan)	11	(1)
2013–2014	→ Arminia Bielefeld II (loan)	8	(5)
2016–2019	PEC Zwolle	19	(0)
2017–2019	→ NEC (loan)	45	(22)
2019	Dordrecht	14	(1)
2020–2023	Sepsi OSK	73	(5)
2023	Aiolikos	2	(0)
2023–	Westlandia		

International career
2008–2009	Netherlands U15	4	(1)
2009–2011	Netherlands U17	12	(6)
2011–2013	Netherlands U19	19	(13)
2013–2015	Netherlands U20	2	(1)
Medal record
Men's football
Representing Netherlands
UEFA European Under-17 Championship
Winner	2011 Serbia
- * Club domestic league appearances and goals as of 12:47, 8 December 2023 (UTC)

Anass Achahbar (Arabic: أنس أشهبار; born 13 January 1994) is a Dutch professional footballer who plays as a midfielder for Vierde Divisie club Westlandia.

== Career ==
=== Feyenoord ===
Born in The Hague, Achahbar made his professional debut for Feyenoord on 28 August 2011, as he replaced Kelvin Leerdam in the 81st minute of the Eredivisie home match against Heerenveen (2–2).

Achahbar scored his first goal for Feyenoord in the 93rd minute of the first leg of the UEFA Europa League qualifier against Sparta Prague in De Kuip, an important equalizer that meant that Feyenoord came away with a 2–2 draw.

==== Arminia Bielefeld (loan) ====
On 22 August 2013, Achahbar was sent on loan at Arminia Bielefeld until the end of the season. He made 11 appearances in the 2. Bundesliga for the club, and also played in the Oberliga Westfalen for the second team. After his loan, he returned to Feyenoord for the 2014–15 season.

=== PEC Zwolle ===
On 21 May 2016, Achahbar signed a four-year contract with Eredivisie side PEC Zwolle. In his first season at the club, he made 20 total appearances in which he scored one goal.

==== NEC (loan) ====
On 28 June 2017, Achahar joined second-tier Eerste Divisie club NEC on loan. He made his debut on 8 September 2017 in the 3–0 loss to Den Bosch. He came on for Janio Bikel after 65 minutes. He suffered a number of injuries during his first period at the club. He had five stitches placed in his foot, broke a finger and had an injury to his shoulder. On 24 November, he made his return against Jong Ajax. On 27 November, he scored his first goal of the season against Telstar. On 22 December, he scored the first hat-trick of his career against Jong AZ (7–2 victory). In the following game against Go Ahead Eagles (5–1 win), he scored another hat-trick. Achahbar was loaned out to NEC for a second season in the 2018–19 season. In January 2019, after an argument with trainer Jack de Gier during the away match against Eindhoven, he was demoted to the second team together with Brahim Darri and did not return to the first team after that.

In the summer of 2019 Achahbar would return to PEC Zwolle, but eventually PEC Zwolle and Achahbar decided to terminate the ongoing contract.

=== Dordrecht ===
After practicing with Dordrecht for three weeks, he joined the club on 9 September for the 2019–20 season. After four months, in which he made 16 appearances, he left the club.

=== Sepsi OSK ===
On 18 January 2020, Achahbar signed a contract with Liga I side Sepsi OSK. He was part of the team losing the 2019–20 Cupa României to FCSB. In the semi-finals, Achahbar had contributed with two goals as Sepsi won 5–1 over Politehnica Iași to advance to the final.

=== Aiolikos ===
On 15 September 2023, Achahbar signed for Super League Greece 2 club Aiolikos.

=== Westlandia ===
On 28 December 2023, Achabar signed for Vierde Divisie team Westlandia for the remainder of the season.

== Career statistics ==
As of 28 February 2023

Club	Season	League			Cup (Note: Includes KNVB Cup, Cupa României)		Continental		Other		Total	
Club	Season	Division	Apps	Goals	Apps	Goals	Apps	Goals	Apps	Goals	Apps	Goals
Feyenoord	2011–12	Eredivisie	7	0	2	1	—		—		9	1
Feyenoord	2012–13	Eredivisie	7	0	2	0	2 (Note: Appearances in UEFA Europa League)	1	—		11	1
Feyenoord	2014–15	Eredivisie	12	4	0	0	2	0	2 (Note: Appearances in Eredivisie European Competition play-offs)	1	16	5
Feyenoord	2015–16	Eredivisie	7	2	0	0	—		—		7	2
Feyenoord	Total		33	6	4	1	4	1	2	1	43	9
Arminia Bielefeld (loan)	2013–14	2. Bundesliga	11	1	0	0	—		—		11	1
PEC Zwolle	2016–17	Eredivisie	19	0	1	1	—		—		20	1
NEC (loan)	2017–18	Eerste Divisie	25	15	1	0	—		2 (Note: Appearances in Eredivisie promotion/relegation play-offs)	2	28	17
NEC (loan)	2018–19	Eerste Divisie	20	7	2	1	—		0	0	22	8
NEC (loan)	Total		45	22	3	1	—		2	2	50	25
Dordrecht	2019–20	Eerste Divisie	14	1	2	3	—		—		16	4
Sepsi OSK	2019–20	Liga I	14	0	4	3	—		—		18	3
Sepsi OSK	2020–21	Liga I	28	2	1	0	—		1 (Note: appearance in Liga I play-offs for UEFA Europa Conference League)	0	30	2
Sepsi OSK	2021–22	Liga I	17	2	2	0	2	0	—		21	2
Sepsi OSK	2022–23	Liga I	14	1	3	0	1	0	0	0	17	1
Sepsi OSK	Total		73	5	10	3	3	0	1	0	87	8
Aiolikos	2023–24	Super League Greece 2	0	0	0	0	—		—		0	0
Career total			195	35	20	9	7	1	5	3	227	48

== Honours ==
=== Club ===
Feyenoord

- KNVB Cup: 2015–16

Sepsi OSK

- Cupa României: 2021–22, 2022–23
- Supercupa României: 2022

Netherlands U17

- UEFA European Under-17 Football Championship: 2011

Individual

- 2011 UEFA European Under-17 Championship Team of the Tournament
- 2013 UEFA European Under-19 Championship Golden Boot: 2013
