= Lithuania national under-19 football team =

National U-19 association football team

Lithuania
- Association: Lithuanian Football Federation
- Confederation: UEFA (Europe)
- Head coach: (Lithuania) Mindaugas Čepas
- FIFA code: LTU
First colours	Second colours

First international
- Lithuania 1–0 Russia

Biggest win
- Armenia 0–5 Lithuania (Vilnius, Lithuania; 16 October 2002)

Biggest defeat
- Lithuania 1–7 Germany (Larnaca, Cyprus; 19 July 1998)

European Championship
- Appearances: 2 (first in 1998)
- Best result: Group stage (1998, 2013)

The Lithuania national under-19 football team represents Lithuania in international football at the under-19 age level and is governed by the Lithuanian Football Federation.

== Competitive record ==
*Denotes draws include knockout matches decided on penalty kicks.
Gold background colour indicates that the tournament was won.
Silver background colour indicates second-place finish.
Bronze background colour indicates third-place finish.
Red border color indicates tournament was held on home soil.

=== UEFA European U-19 Championship ===
UEFA European Under-19 Championship record
Year	Round	Pld	W	D *	L	GF	GA
(Norway) 2002	did not qualify						
(Liechtenstein) 2003	did not qualify						
(Switzerland) 2004	did not qualify						
(Northern Ireland) 2005	did not qualify						
(Poland) 2006	did not qualify						
(Austria) 2007	did not qualify						
(Czech Republic) 2008	did not qualify						
(Ukraine) 2009	did not qualify						
(France) 2010	did not qualify						
(Romania) 2011	did not qualify						
(Estonia) 2012	did not qualify						
(Lithuania) 2013	Group stage	3	0	0	3	4	9
(Hungary) 2014	did not qualify						
(Greece) 2015	did not qualify						
(Germany) 2016	did not qualify						
(Georgia (country)) 2017	did not qualify						
(Finland) 2018	did not qualify						
(Armenia) 2019	did not qualify						
(Northern Ireland) 2020	cancelled						
(Romania) 2021	cancelled						
(Slovakia) 2022	did not qualify						
(Malta) 2023	did not qualify						
(Northern Ireland) 2024	did not qualify						
(Romania) 2025	did not qualify						
(Wales) 2026	did not qualify						
(Israel) 2027	TBD						
Total	1/22	3	0	0	3	4	9

== Recent results ==
2026

25 March 2026 2027 UEFA U-19 Championship qualification, I round	Azerbaijan	0:4	Lithuania	(Lithuania) Raudondvaris, Raudondvario stadionas
17:00		Report	Dovas Grudzinskas 29' 45'; Rodion Piazenko 74'; Jugas Turčinskas 82'	Attendance: 250; Referee: Ion Orlic (Moldova)

31 March 2026 2027 UEFA U-19 Championship qualification, I round	Lithuania	0:0	Northern Ireland	(Lithuania) Raudondvaris, Raudondvario stadionas
17:00		Report		Attendance: 175; Referee: Viktor Kopiievskyi (Ukraine)

4 June 2026 2026 U-19 Baltic Cup	Lithuania	1:0	Latvia	(Latvia) Jāņa Skredeļa stadions, Riga
17:00	Žygimantas Jurevičius 59'	Report		Attendance: 163; Referee: Valters Zandreiters (Latvia)

6 June 2026 2026 U-19 Baltic Cup	Estonia	3:1	Lithuania	(Latvia) Daugavgrīva Sports Base, Riga
17:00	Remo Valdmets 22'; Kaspar Anton 44'; Artjom Truuväärt 51'	Report	Joris Petravičius 14'	Attendance: 84; Referee: Artemijs Judins (Latvia)

30 September 2026 Friendly	Albania	3:2	Lithuania	(Albania) Vora Stadium, Vorë
	Oliver Blini 18'; Jokūbas Žiedelis 90+1' (o.g.); Armend Muslika 90+6' (pen.)		Tomas Gudaitis 66'; Darko Mališanovič 87'	Referee: Albano Stolaj (Albania)

2025

Date	Venue	Opponent	Result	Competition
12 November 2025	(Lithuania) Raudondvaris	England U-19	0:2	2026 UEFA European Under-19 Championship qualification
15 November 2025	(Lithuania) Raudondvaris	Scotland U-19	2:1	2026 UEFA European Under-19 Championship qualification
18 November 2025	(Lithuania) Raudondvaris	Latvia U-19	1:2	2026 UEFA European Under-19 Championship qualification

=== Achievements ===
- Under-19 Baltic Cup winners
  - 2010, 2015, 2017
- UEFA European Under-19 Championship group stage
  - 1998 (U-18 format), 2013 (hosts)

== Players ==
=== Current squad ===
The following players were called up to the squad for the friendly games against Albania U-19 on 30 September and 2 October 2026.

Caps and goals correct as of 30 September 2026, after the match against Albania U-19.

No.	Pos.	Player	Date of birth (age)	Caps	Goals	Club
1	GK	Kristupas Čepulis	2 August 2008 (age 18)	2		(Lithuanian Football Federation) Vilnius Football Academy
12	GK	Dominykas Čekavičius	12 March 2008 (age 18)	3		(Lithuanian Football Federation) FK Žalgiris
4	DF	Tomas Jonyla	7 January 2009 (age 17)	3		(The Football Association) West Ham United FC
4	DF	Jokūbas Žiedelis	14 January 2008 (age 18)	5	1	(Italian Football Federation) SS Monopoli 1966
5	DF	Jugas Turčinskas	17 January 2008 (age 18)	8	1	(Italian Football Federation) SS Monopoli 1966
15	DF	Martynas Stambrauskas		2		(Lithuanian Football Federation) Vilnius Football Academy
	DF	Nojus Stelmokas	14 March 2008 (age 18)			(Lithuanian Football Federation) FC Hegelmann
	DF	Dominykas Zubavičius	24 November 2009 (age 16)			(Lithuanian Football Federation) FK Kauno Žalgiris
2	MF	Paulius Stankus	15 December 2008 (age 17)	5		(Lithuanian Football Federation) FK Be1
8	MF	Klemensas Gustas	22 July 2008 (age 18)	5		(Lithuanian Football Federation) FA Šiauliai
13	MF	Deividas Česnauskis	23 July 2008 (age 18)	3		(Italian Football Federation) US Catanzaro 1929
16	MF	Tomas Gudaitis	4 November 2008 (age 18)	3	1	(Lithuanian Football Federation) FK Be1
17	MF	Dominykas Liepis		5		(Lithuanian Football Federation) Vilnius Football Academy
19	MF	Žygimantas Jurevičius	16 July 2008 (age 18)	3	1	(Lithuanian Football Federation) BFA
20	MF	Norbert Diugevič	8 January 2008 (age 18)	4		(Lithuanian Football Federation) Vilnius Football Academy
	MF	Adomas Buikus	11 June 2008 (age 18)	8		(Italian Football Federation) Bologna FC 1909
	MF	Deividas Lukas	23 April 2008 (age 18)	1		(Lithuanian Football Federation) FK Banga
	MF	Domas Sinkevičius	17 March 2008 (age 18)	1		(Lithuanian Football Federation) FC Hegelmann
	MF	Kajus Čepas	9 September 2009 (age 17)			(The Football Association) Blackburn Rovers FC
9	FW	Rodion Piazenko	1 March 2008 (age 18)	7	1	(French Football Federation) AS Monaco
	FW	Darko Mališanovič	2 February 2009 (age 17)	1		(German Football Association) SC Freiburg

== See also ==
- Lithuania national football team
- Lithuania national under-21 football team
- Lithuania national under-17 football team
