= 2007 UEFA European Under-19 Championship squads =

Player listings in youth football competition

Players born on or after 1 January 1988 were eligible to participate in the tournament. Players' age as of 16 July 2007 – the tournament's opening day. Players in bold have later been capped at full international level.

== Group A ==
=== Austria ===
Head coach: (Austria) Hermann Stadler

No.	Pos.	Player	Date of birth (age)	Caps	Club
1	GK	David Schartner	6 April 1988 (aged 19)		(Austria) Seekirchen
2	DF	Georg Margreitter	10 February 1988 (aged 19)		(Austria) LASK Linz
3	DF	Rene Seebacher	6 January 1988 (aged 19)		(Austria) Kärnten
4	MF	Dominic Purcher	21 June 1988 (aged 19)		(Austria) Sturm Graz
5	DF	Christian Ramsebner	21 March 1989 (aged 18)		Austria Wien
6	MF	**Julian Baumgartlinger**	16 April 1988 (aged 19)		(Germany) 1860 München
7	MF	Haris Bukva	2 November 1988 (aged 18)		Austria Kärnten
8	FW	**Daniel Beichler**	13 October 1988 (aged 18)		(Austria) Sturm Graz
9	FW	Marc Sand	14 April 1988 (aged 19)		(Germany) VfL Bochum
10	FW	Christoph Mattes	16 April 1988 (aged 19)		(Netherlands) Heerenveen
11	DF	Manuel Salomon	9 July 1988 (aged 19)		(Austria) Lustenau
12	FW	**Rubin Okotie**	6 June 1988 (aged 19)		Austria Wien
13	MF	Thomas Hinum	24 July 1987 (aged 19)		Austria Kärnten
14	DF	Michael Glauninger	18 January 1988 (aged 19)		(Austria) Grazer AK
15	MF	Clemens Walch	10 July 1987 (aged 20)		(Austria) Red Bull Salzburg
16	MF	Peter Hackmair	6 June 1987 (aged 20)		(Austria) Ried
17	FW	**Marko Arnautović**	19 April 1989 (aged 18)		(Netherlands) Twente
18	GK	Michael Zaglmair	7 December 1987 (aged 19)		(Austria) LASK Linz

=== Greece ===
Head coach: (Greece) Nikos Nioplias

No.	Pos.	Player	Date of birth (age)	Caps	Club
1	GK	Ilias Vouras	20 February 1988 (aged 19)		(Greece) Kerkyra
2	DF	Michalis Boukouvalas	14 January 1988 (aged 19)		(Greece) AEL
3	DF	Vassilios Apostolopoulos	13 August 1988 (aged 18)		(Greece) Atromitos
4	DF	**Sokratis Papastathopoulos**	9 June 1988 (aged 19)		(Greece) AEK Athens
5	DF	Manolis Moniakis	9 November 1988 (aged 19)		(Greece) OFI Crete
6	MF	Georgios Siakkas	23 March 1988 (aged 19)		(Greece) Panserraikos
7	DF	**Sotiris Ninis**	3 April 1990 (aged 17)		(Greece) Panathinaikos
8	DF	Georgios Ioannidis	4 May 1988 (aged 19)		(Greece) Iraklis
9	FW	**Athanasios Papazoglou**	30 March 1988 (aged 19)		(Greece) Aris
10	MF	Andreas Lampropoulos	30 July 1988 (aged 19)		(Greece) AEL
11	FW	**Kostantinos Mitroglou**	12 March 1988 (aged 19)		(Greece) Olympiacos
12	GK	Kiriakos Stratilatis	6 April 1988 (aged 18)		(Greece) Aris
13	MF	Vasilios Koutsianikoulis	24 July 1988 (aged 19)		(Greece) Ergotelis
14	MF	**Vasileios Pliatsikas**	18 January 1988 (aged 19)		(Greece) AEK Athens
15	DF	Anastasios Papazoglou	10 July 1988 (aged 19)		(Greece) Panserraikos
16	MF	**Giannis Papadopoulos**	9 March 1989 (aged 18)		(Greece) Iraklis
17	FW	**Elini Dimoutsos**	18 August 1988 (aged 18)		(Greece) Panathinaikos
18	DF	**Dimitris Siovas**	16 September 1988 (aged 19)		(Greece) Panionios

=== Portugal ===
Head coach: (Portugal) Edgar Borges

No.	Pos.	Player	Date of birth (age)	Caps	Club
1	GK	Hugo Ventura	14 January 1988 (aged 19)		(Portugal) Porto
2	DF	Luís Portela	28 January 1988 (aged 19)		(Portugal) Vitória de Setúbal
3	DF	Bura	17 December 1988 (aged 18)		(Portugal) Ribeirão
4	DF	**Daniel Carriço** ((captain))	4 August 1988 (aged 18)		(Portugal) Estrela da Amadora
5	DF	Rúben Lima	3 October 1989 (aged 17)		(Portugal) Desportivo das Aves
6	MF	João Martins	30 June 1988 (aged 19)		(Portugal) Olhanense
7	FW	**Ukra**	16 March 1988 (aged 19)		(Portugal) Porto
8	MF	André Castro	2 April 1988 (aged 19)		(Portugal) Porto
9	FW	Daniel Candeias	23 February 1988 (aged 19)		(Portugal) Varzim
10	MF	Fábio Paím	15 February 1988 (aged 19)		(Portugal) Sporting CP
11	FW	João Gonçalves	18 January 1988 (aged 19)		(Portugal) Olivais e Moscavide
12	GK	Marco Pinto	22 March 1988 (aged 19)		(Portugal) Belenenses
13	MF	**Stélvio Cruz**	24 January 1989 (aged 18)		(Portugal) Braga
14	FW	Ivan Santos	22 September 1988 (aged 18)		(Portugal) Boavista
15	DF	Tiago Pinto	1 February 1988 (aged 19)		(Portugal) Olivais e Moscavide
16	FW	Pedro Ribeiro	24 May 1988 (aged 19)		(Portugal) Académica
17	FW	**Orlando Sá**	26 May 1988 (aged 19)		(Portugal) Braga
18	DF	Yago Fernández	5 January 1988 (aged 19)		(Spain) Valencia Mestalla

=== Spain ===
Head coach: (Spain) Juan Santisteban

No.	Pos.	Player	Date of birth (age)	Caps	Club
1	GK	Felipe Ramos	1 October 1988 (aged 18)		(Spain) Real Madrid Castilla
2	DF	Víctor Díaz	12 June 1988 (aged 19)		(Spain) Sevilla Atlético
3	DF	Javi Cantero	22 January 1988 (aged 19)		(Spain) Barcelona B
4	MF	Javier Modrego	19 January 1988 (aged 19)		(Spain) Real Madrid Castilla
5	DF	Ion Echaide	5 January 1988 (aged 19)		(Spain) Osasuna
6	MF	Ángel Montoro	25 June 1988 (aged 19)		(Spain) Valencia
7	DF	**César Azpilicueta**	28 August 1989 (aged 17)		(Spain) Osasuna
8	DF	**Javi Martínez** (c)	2 September 1988 (aged 18)		(Spain) Athletic Bilbao
9	FW	**Emilio Nsue**	30 September 1989 (aged 17)		(Spain) Mallorca
10	MF	Aarón	26 April 1989 (aged 18)		(Spain) Xerez
11	FW	Carles Coto	11 February 1988 (aged 19)		(Belgium) Mouscron
12	DF	Pablo Gil	8 October 1988 (aged 18)		(Spain) Albacete
13	GK	**Sergio Asenjo**	28 June 1989 (aged 18)		(Spain) Real Valladolid
14	DF	**Mikel San José**	16 May 1989 (aged 18)		(Spain) Athletic Bilbao
15	MF	**Dani Parejo**	16 April 1989 (aged 18)		(Spain) Real Madrid Castilla
16	FW	Carlos Martínez	29 March 1988 (aged 19)		(Spain) Albacete
17	MF	José Zamora	20 August 1988 (aged 18)		(Spain) Eibar
18	FW	Jesús Berrocal	5 February 1988 (aged 19)		(Spain) Real Madrid Castilla
19	GK	Isaac Becerra	18 June 1988 (aged 19)		(Spain) Espanyol

- Only 19 players in Spain squad.

== Group B ==
=== France ===
Head coach: (France) Guy Ferrier

No.	Pos.	Player	Date of birth (age)	Caps	Club
1	GK	Johann Carrasso	7 May 1988 (aged 19)		(France) Montpellier
2	DF	William Vainqueur	19 November 1988 (aged 18)		(France) Nantes
3	DF	Paul Baysse	18 May 1988 (aged 19)		(France) Sedan
4	DF	Garry Bocaly	19 April 1988 (aged 19)		(France) Libourne
5	DF	Guillaume Borne	12 October 1988 (aged 18)		(France) Rennes
6	DF	Jean-Alain Fanchone	2 September 1988 (aged 18)		(France) Strasbourg
7	FW	**Étienne Capoue**	11 July 1988 (aged 19)		(France) Toulouse
8	MF	Malaury Martin	25 August 1988 (aged 18)		(France) Monaco
9	FW	**Rudy Gestede**	10 October 1988 (aged 18)		(France) Metz
10	MF	**Bakary Sako**	26 April 1988 (aged 19)		(France) Châteauroux
11	FW	Steve Pinau	11 March 1988 (aged 19)		(France) Monaco
12	FW	**Frédéric Nimani**	8 October 1988 (aged 18)		(France) Monaco
13	MF	**Granddi Ngoyi**	17 May 1988 (aged 19)		(France) Paris Saint-Germain
14	FW	Kevin Monnet-Paquet	19 August 1988 (aged 18)		(France) Lens
15	MF	Damien Plessis	5 March 1988 (aged 19)		(England) Liverpool
16	GK	Simon Pontdemé	4 May 1988 (aged 19)		(France) Niort
17	MF	Quentin Othon	27 March 1988 (aged 19)		(France) Strasbourg
18	DF	Jean-Yves Mvoto	6 September 1988 (aged 18)		(France) Paris Saint-Germain

=== Germany ===
Head coach: (Germany) Frank Engel

No.	Pos.	Player	Date of birth (age)	Caps	Club
1	GK	Martin Männel	16 March 1988 (aged 19)		(Germany) Energie Cottbus
2	MF	Daniel Schwaab	28 August 1988 (aged 18)		(Germany) SC Freiburg
3	DF	Arne Feick	1 April 1988 (aged 19)		(Germany) Energie Cottbus
4	MF	**Benedikt Höwedes**	22 February 1988 (aged 19)		(Germany) Schalke 04
5	DF	Alexander Eberlein	14 January 1988 (aged 19)		(Germany) 1860 Munich
6	MF	Sergej Evljuskin	4 January 1988 (aged 19)		(Germany) VfL Wolfsburg
7	DF	**Jérôme Boateng**	3 September 1988 (aged 18)		(Germany) Hertha BSC
8	FW	**Sidney Sam**	31 January 1988 (aged 19)		(Germany) Hamburger SV
9	FW	Dennis Schmidt	18 April 1988 (aged 19)		(Germany) Bayer Leverkusen
10	MF	**Änis Ben-Hatira**	18 July 1988 (aged 18)		(Germany) Hamburger SV
11	MF	**Max Kruse**	19 March 1988 (aged 19)		(Germany) Werder Bremen
12	GK	Ralf Fährmann	27 September 1988 (aged 18)		(Germany) Schalke 04
13	MF	Manuel Konrad	14 April 1988 (aged 19)		(Germany) SC Freiburg
14	FW	**Sebastian Tyrala**	22 February 1988 (aged 19)		(Germany) Borussia Dortmund
15	DF	Christian Sauter	11 February 1988 (aged 19)		(Germany) VfB Stuttgart
16	FW	**Nils Petersen**	6 December 1988 (aged 18)		(Germany) Carl Zeiss Jena
17	FW	**Mesut Özil**	15 October 1988 (aged 18)		(Germany) Schalke 04
18	DF	Kim Falkenberg	10 April 1988 (aged 19)		(Germany) Bayer Leverkusen

=== Russia ===
Head coach: (Russia) Ravil Sabitov

No.	Pos.	Player	Date of birth (age)	Caps	Club
1	GK	Sergei Borodin	19 October 1988 (aged 18)		(Russia) Krylia Sovetov Dimitrovgrad
2	DF	Artyom Pershin	6 February 1988 (aged 19)		(Russia) Lokomotiv Moscow
3	DF	**Ruslan Kambolov**	1 April 1988 (aged 19)		(Russia) Lokomotiv Moscow
4	MF	Rushan Khasyanov	27 January 1988 (aged 19)		(Russia) Dynamo Moscow
5	DF	Sergei Golyatkin	4 May 1988 (aged 19)		(Russia) Vityaz Podolsk
6	DF	Andrei Kuznetsov	4 January 1988 (aged 19)		(Russia) Lokomotiv Moscow
7	MF	Ruslan Balov	3 September 1988 (aged 18)		(Russia) Spartak Nalchik
8	FW	Vladimir Dyadyun	27 September 1988 (aged 18)		(Russia) Rubin Kazan
9	MF	Kirill Kurochkin	30 January 1988 (aged 19)		(Russia) Mordovia Saransk
10	FW	**Artyom Dzyuba**	18 July 1988 (aged 18)		(Russia) Spartak Moscow
11	MF	**Pavel Mamaev**	19 March 1988 (aged 19)		(Russia) CSKA Moscow
12	GK	Sergei Pesyakov	16 December 1988 (aged 18)		(Russia) Tekstilshchik-Telekom Ivanovo
13	DF	Valeri Sokolov	14 April 1988 (aged 19)		(Russia) Saturn Moscow Oblast
14	MF	**Igor Smolnikov**	22 February 1988 (aged 19)		(Russia) Lokomotiv Moscow
15	FW	Maksim Andreyev	19 January 1988 (aged 19)		(Russia) Zenit Saint Petersburg
16	FW	Aleksandr Salugin	6 December 1988 (aged 18)		(Russia) CSKA Moscow
17	DF	Andrei Ivanov	15 October 1988 (aged 18)		(Russia) Spartak Moscow
18	FW	Nikita Andreyev	22 September 1988 (aged 18)		(Estonia) Levadia

=== Serbia ===
Head coach: (Serbia) Zvonko Živković

No.	Pos.	Player	Date of birth (age)	Caps	Club
1	GK	Branislav Danilović	24 June 1988 (aged 19)		(Serbia) Rad
2	DF	Nenad Adamović	12 January 1989 (aged 18)		(Serbia) Teleoptik
3	DF	Nemanja Zlatković	21 August 1988 (aged 18)		(Serbia) Zemun
4	DF	Miloš Karišik	27 November 1988 (aged 18)		(Serbia) Teleoptik
5	DF	**Jagoš Vuković**	21 August 1988 (aged 18)		(Serbia) Rad
6	DF	Nikola Gulan	23 March 1989 (aged 18)		(Serbia) Partizan
7	DF	**Ljubomir Fejsa**	14 August 1988 (aged 18)		(Serbia) Hajduk Kula
8	MF	Miloš Bosančić	22 May 1988 (aged 19)		(Serbia) Partizan
9	FW	Rodoljub Marjanović	21 January 1988 (aged 19)		(Serbia) Rad
10	FW	**Miralem Sulejmani**	5 December 1988 (aged 18)		(Serbia) Partizan
11	MF	**Dušan Tadić**	20 November 1988 (aged 18)		(Serbia) Vojvodina
12	GK	Živko Živković	14 April 1989 (aged 18)		(Serbia) Teleoptik
13	DF	Zoran Milovac	29 October 1988 (aged 18)		(Serbia) OFK Beograd
14	DF	**Ivan Radovanović**	29 August 1988 (aged 18)		(Serbia) Partizan
15	MF	Dragomir Vukobratović	12 May 1988 (aged 19)		(Serbia) Voždovac
16	FW	Miloš Živanović	11 June 1988 (aged 19)		(Serbia) Partizan
17	MF	Nenad Srećković	11 April 1988 (aged 19)		(Serbia) Red Star Belgrade
18	FW	Nenad Marinković	28 September 1988 (aged 18)		(Serbia) Partizan
