= 2007 UEFA European Under-19 Championship qualification =

UEFA U-19 Championship 2007 (qualifying round) was the first round of qualifications for the final tournament of UEFA U-19 Championship 2007. 48 teams are split into 12 groups of 4 and teams in each group play each other once. The top two teams in each group and the best third-placed team will enter UEFA U-19 Championship 2007 (Elite Round).

== Matches ==
=== Group 1 ===
Team	Pld	W	D	L	GF	GA	GD	Pts
Greece	3	2	0	1	6	5	+1	6
Bulgaria (H)	3	1	1	1	4	2	+2	4
Ukraine	3	1	1	1	3	2	+1	4
Kazakhstan	3	1	0	2	4	8	−4	3

(H) Hosts

2006-10-20

Ukraine	2–0	Kazakhstan
Kurilov 45'; Lysenko 78'

Gradski Stadium, Nesebar
Referee: Hermansen (Denmark)

2006-10-20

Greece	2–0	Bulgaria
Labropoulos 67'; Vallianos 75'

Naftex Stadium, Burgas
Referee: Van Der Velde (Belgium)

2006-10-22

Ukraine	0–0	Bulgaria

Naftex Stadium, Burgas
Referee: Hermansen (Denmark)

2006-10-22

Kazakhstan	4–2	Greece
Kukeyev 47'; Zhumahanov 48' (pen.), 60' (pen.); Bassenko 90+4'		Mitroglou 73'; Pliatsikas 80'

Gradski Stadium, Nesebar
Referee: Sipailo (Latvia)

2006-10-25

Greece	2–1	Ukraine
Pliatsikas 12'; Labropoulos 29'		Lysenko 13'

Gradski Stadium, Nesebar
Referee: Van Der Velde (Belgium)

2006-10-25

Bulgaria	4–0	Kazakhstan
Iliev 24'; Baltanov 72', 86', 88'

Naftex Stadium, Burgas
Referee: Sipailo (Latvia)

=== Group 2 ===
Team	Pld	W	D	L	GF	GA	GD	Pts
Israel	3	3	0	0	11	1	+10	9
Switzerland	3	2	0	1	6	3	+3	6
Slovenia (H)	3	1	0	2	6	5	+1	3
Liechtenstein	3	0	0	3	0	14	−14	0

(H) Hosts

2006-10-06

Israel	2–1	Switzerland
Biton 77'; Chekol 87'		Klingler 45'

NK Aluminij, Kidričevo
Referee: Zografos (Greece)

2006-10-06

Slovenia	5–0	Liechtenstein
Matavž 8', 49'; Velikonja 17'; Mihelič 81'; Vračko 90+2'

Ob Jezeru, Velenje
Referee: Banari (Moldova)

2006-10-08

Israel	6–0	Liechtenstein
Bar Buzaglo 10'; Azriel 11', 35'; Natcho 13'; Biton 30'; Rikan 90'

City Stadium, Ptuj
Referee: Hietala (Finland)

2006-10-08

Switzerland	2–1	Slovenia
Derdiyok 36'; Rakitić 57'		Matavž 41'

Ljudski vrt, Maribor
Referee: Zografos (Greece)

2006-10-11

Slovenia	0–3	Israel
		Kapiloto 51'; Roash 85'; Biton 87'

NK Aluminij, Kidričevo
Referee: Banari (Moldova)

2006-10-11

Liechtenstein	0–3	Switzerland
		Derdiyok 10', 64', 78'

Ob Jezeru, Velenje
Referee: Banari (Moldova)

=== Group 3 ===
Team	Pld	W	D	L	GF	GA	GD	Pts
Republic of Ireland	3	3	0	0	8	1	+7	9
Netherlands	3	2	0	1	4	3	+1	6
Belarus	3	1	0	2	3	7	−4	3
Macedonia (H)	3	0	0	3	0	4	−4	0

(H) Hosts

2006-10-06

Netherlands	3–1	Belarus
Buijs 40', 69'; Anita 88'		Bubnow 68'

Mladost Stadium, Strumica
Referee: Matejek (Czech Republic)

2006-10-06

Republic of Ireland	2–0	Macedonia
Judge 41'; Rooney 72'

FC Turnovo, Strumica
Referee: Laursen (Denmark)

2006-10-09

Netherlands	1–0	Macedonia
Goossens 90+3'

Mladost Stadium, Strumica
Referee: Trattou (Cyprus)

2006-10-09

Belarus	1–4	Republic of Ireland
Rekish 37'		Rooney 2', 51', 72'; Spillane 57'

FC Turnovo, Strumica
Referee: Laursen (Denmark)

2006-10-11

Republic of Ireland	2–0	Netherlands
Dennehy 22'; Rooney 37'

Mladost Stadium, Strumica
Referee: Matejek (Czech Republic)

2006-10-11

Macedonia	0–1	Belarus
		Kalatsey 58'

FC Turnovo, Strumica
Referee: Trattou (Cyprus)

=== Group 4 ===
Team	Pld	W	D	L	GF	GA	GD	Pts
Romania (H)	3	3	0	0	10	2	+8	9
Georgia	3	2	0	1	4	5	−1	6
Belgium	3	1	0	2	8	9	−1	3
Northern Ireland	3	0	0	3	2	8	−6	0

(H) Hosts

2006-10-04

Belgium	2–4	Romania
Pollet 36'; Villano 45' (pen.)		Ganea 25', 90+1' (pen.); Cojocnean 30'; Rusescu 48'

Conpet Stadium, Strejnic
Referee: Zrnić (Bosnia and Herzegovina)

2006-10-04

Georgia	1–0	Northern Ireland
Benashvili 43'

Astra Stadium, Ploieşti
Referee: Strahonja (Croatia)

2006-10-06

Belgium	4–2	Northern Ireland
Cherlet 22'; Vossen 33', 78'; Villano 88'		McGaw 29', 47'

Astra Stadium, Ploieşti
Referee: Demirlek (Turkey)

2006-10-06

Romania	3–0	Georgia
Ochirosii 25'; Cojocnean 55', 87'

Conpet Stadium, Strejnic
Referee: Strahonja (Croatia)

2006-10-09

Georgia	3–2	Belgium
Tsinamdzgvrishvili 57'; Benashvili 85'; Khidesheli 90+2'		Vossen 72'; Pollet 90+3'

Astra Stadium, Ploieşti
Referee: Zrnić (Bosnia and Herzegovina)

2006-10-09

Northern Ireland	0–3	Romania
		Buhaescu 14'; Marcu 75'; Rusescu 89'

Conpet Stadium, Strejnic
Referee: Demirlek (Turkey)

=== Group 5 ===
Team	Pld	W	D	L	GF	GA	GD	Pts
Russia	3	2	0	1	4	1	+3	6
Slovakia	3	2	0	1	6	3	+3	6
Albania	3	2	0	1	5	4	+1	6
Andorra (H)	3	0	0	3	0	7	−7	0

(H) Hosts

2006-09-27

Russia	2–0	Andorra
Dzyuba 38' (pen.); Andreev 58'

Estadi Comunal d'Andorra la Vella, Andorra la Vella
Referee: Constantin (Romania)

2006-09-27

Slovakia	2–3	Albania
Duris 11', 28'		Shiba 27'; Hyka 55'; Malindi 75'

Estadi Comunal d'Andorra la Vella, Andorra la Vella
Referee: Toussaint (Luxembourg)

2006-09-29

Russia	2–0	Albania
Andreev 66'; Dzyuba 83'

Estadi Comunal d'Andorra la Vella, Andorra la Vella
Referee: Collum (Scotland)

2006-09-29

Andorra	0–3	Slovakia
		Zápotoka 18', 29'; Duris 38'

Estadi Comunal d'Andorra la Vella, Andorra la Vella
Referee: Constantin (Romania)

2006-10-02

Slovakia	1–0	Russia
Grendel 31'

Estadi Comunal d'Andorra la Vella, Andorra la Vella
Referee: Collum (Scotland)

2006-10-02

Albania	2–0	Andorra
Çota 11' (pen.); Malindi 90+3'

Estadi Comunal d'Andorra la Vella, Andorra la Vella
Referee: Toussaint (Luxembourg)

=== Group 6 ===
Team	Pld	W	D	L	GF	GA	GD	Pts
Poland	3	2	0	1	5	4	+1	6
Sweden (H)	3	2	0	1	7	4	+3	6
Iceland	3	2	0	1	5	3	+2	6
Faroe Islands	3	0	0	3	3	9	−6	0

(H) Hosts

2006-10-06

Sweden	4–1	Faroe Islands
Avdić 13', 61'; Karlsson 21'; Holmqvist 39'		Mouritsen 37'

Markaryd Stadion, Markaryd
Referee: Malzinskas (Lithuania)

2006-10-06

Poland	0–2	Iceland
		Gislason 21'; Pavlov 46'

Ljungby Stadion, Ljungby
Referee: Circhetta (Switzerland)

2006-10-08

Sweden	2–0	Iceland
Holmqvist 15'; Nilsson 49'

Alvesta Stadion, Alvesta
Referee: Berezka (Ukraine)

2006-10-08

Faroe Islands	1–2	Poland
Mouritsen 54'		Oziemczuk 65', 86'

Markaryd Stadion, Markaryd
Referee: Malzinskas (Lithuania)

2006-10-11

Poland	3–1	Sweden
Rys 6' (pen.); Augustyn 13', 75'		Holmqvist 11'

Ljungby Stadion, Ljungby
Referee: Circhetta (Switzerland)

2006-10-11

Iceland	3–1	Faroe Islands
Jonsson 45'; Smarason 60'; Gislason 62'		Sam Jacobsen 81'

Alvesta Stadion, Alvesta
Referee: Berezka (Ukraine)

=== Group 7 ===
Team	Pld	W	D	L	GF	GA	GD	Pts
Hungary	3	3	0	0	12	2	+10	9
Azerbaijan	3	1	1	1	3	7	−4	4
Armenia	3	1	0	2	3	6	−3	3
Cyprus (H)	3	0	1	2	2	5	−3	1

(H) Hosts

2006-10-27

Hungary	3–1	Cyprus
Németh 38', 69'; Farkas 42'		Markou 59'

Ammochostos Stadium, Larnaca
Referee: Olšiak (Slovakia)

2006-10-27

Armenia	1–2	Azerbaijan
Muradyan 44'		Hashimzadeh 49'; Hajiyev 52'

Antonis Papadopoulos Stadium, Larnaca
Referee: Gomes (Portugal)

2006-10-29

Hungary	5–0	Azerbaijan
Farkas 14'; Németh 44', 71', 82'; Filkor 68'

Dasaki Stadium, Famagusta
Referee: Olšiak (Slovakia)

2006-10-29

Cyprus	0–1	Armenia
		Bareghamyan 66'

Tasos Markou Stadium, Paralimni
Referee: Mckeon (Republic of Ireland)

2006-11-01

Armenia	1–4	Hungary
Ghazaryan 72'		Németh 46', 51'; Mészáros 61'; Farkas 68'

Antonis Papadopoulos Stadium, Larnaca
Referee: Mckeon (Republic of Ireland)

2006-11-01

Azerbaijan	1–1	Cyprus
Hajiyev 29'		Kalos 61'

Gyunas Syllogos Zenon, Larnaca
Referee: Gomes (Portugal)

=== Group 8 ===
Team	Pld	W	D	L	GF	GA	GD	Pts
France	3	3	0	0	8	2	+6	9
Denmark (H)	3	1	1	1	5	4	+1	4
Malta	3	0	2	1	4	6	−2	2
Finland	3	0	1	2	3	8	−5	1

(H) Hosts

2006-10-15

France	3–0	Finland
Martin 21' (pen.) da Silva 55'; Pinau 90+1'

Ikast Stadion, Ikast
Referee: Blom (Netherlands)

2006-10-15

Denmark	1–1	Malta
Nielsen 23'		Camilleri 43'

Vejle Stadion, Vejle
Referee: Silagava (Georgia)

2006-10-17

France	4–2	Malta
Pinau 12'; Martin 22'; Ngoyi 43'; Heurtaux 47'		Camilleri 62' (pen.), 75'

Vejle Stadion, Vejle
Referee: Silagava (Georgia)

2006-10-17

Finland	2–4	Denmark
Ojala 5'; Kolehmainen 51'		Andersen 7'; Jensen 13', 48', 88' (pen.)

Haderslev Fodboldstadion, Haderslev
Referee: Stokes (Republic of Ireland)

2006-10-20

Denmark	0–1	France
		Andersen 51' (o.g.)

Fredericia Ny Stadion, Fredericia
Referee: Blom (Netherlands)

2006-10-20

Malta	1–1	Finland
B. Camilleri 43'		Bäckman 87'

Haderslev Fodboldstadion, Haderslev
Referee: Stokes (Republic of Ireland)

=== Group 9 ===
Team	Pld	W	D	L	GF	GA	GD	Pts
Scotland (H)	3	3	0	0	11	0	+11	9
Germany	3	2	0	1	12	3	+9	6
Estonia	3	1	0	2	5	12	−7	3
Bosnia and Herzegovina	3	0	0	3	1	14	−13	0

(H) Hosts

2006 – 10-05

Scotland	6–0	Bosnia and Herzegovina
Goodwillie 11', 32', 44'} Lennon 20'; McLaren 71'; Cameron 79'

Forthbank Stadium, Stirling
Referee: Daniel Stålhammar (Sweden)

2006 – 10-05

Germany	7–2	Estonia
Fischer 6'; Tyrala 12', 37'; Evljuskin 41' (pen.); Schmidt 60'; Kruse 88', 90+1'		Saag 20'; Kallaste 85'

Recreation Park, Alloa
Referee: Peter Rasmussen (Denmark)

2006 – 10-07

Scotland	4–0	Estonia
McDonald 52', 57'; McCormack 65'; Lennon 89'

Falkirk Stadium, Falkirk
Referee: Marek Mikołajewski (Poland)

2006 – 10-0

Bosnia and Herzegovina	0–5	Germany
		Halfar 54'; Schmidt 64', 77'; Özil 75'; Kruse 88'

Forthbank Stadium, Stirling
Referee: Peter Rasmussen (Denmark)

2006 – 10–10

Germany	0–1	Scotland
		Goodwillie 23'

Falkirk Stadium, Falkirk
Referee: Daniel Stålhammar (Sweden)

2006 – 10–10

Estonia	3–1	Bosnia and Herzegovina
Mosnikov 48'; Puri 55'; Saag 71'		Vidović 14'

Recreation Park, Alloa
Referee: Marek Mikołajewski (Poland)

=== Group 10 ===
Team	Pld	W	D	L	GF	GA	GD	Pts
Czech Republic	3	2	1	0	8	1	+7	7
Turkey	3	2	0	1	8	4	+4	6
Luxembourg (H)	3	1	1	1	3	5	−2	4
Wales	3	0	0	3	1	10	−9	0

(H) Hosts

2006 – 10–31

Czech Republic	5–0	Wales
Blažek 29', 45', 49'; Dočkal 51'; Nečas 53'

Grengewald, Hostert
Referee: Svein Oddvar Moen (Norway)

2006 – 10–31

Turkey	4–1	Luxembourg
Caner 27'; Aydın 47'; Tevfik 49', 85'		Sagramola 7'

La Frontière, Esch-sur-Alzette
Referee: Tsvetan Georgiev (Bulgaria)

2006 – 11-02

Turkey	4–1	Wales
Ferhat 4'; Aydın 10'; Tevfik 28'; Özgürcan 69'		Williams 40'

Communal, Mondercange
Referee: Tsvetan Georgiev (Bulgaria)

2006 – 11-02

Luxembourg	1–1	Czech Republic
Scholer 51'		Blažek 42'

Grengewald, Hostert
Referee: Vusal Aliyev (Azerbaijan)

2006 – 11-05

Czech Republic	2–0	Turkey
Necid 3', 25'

La Frontière, Esch-sur-Alzette
Referee: Svein Oddvar Moen (Norway)

2006 – 11-05

Wales	0–1	Luxembourg
		Pjanić 79'

Communal, Mondercange
Referee: Vusal Aliyev (Azerbaijan)

=== Group 11 ===
Team	Pld	W	D	L	GF	GA	GD	Pts
Norway (H)	3	2	1	0	9	3	+6	7
Portugal	3	2	1	0	8	2	+6	7
Latvia	3	1	0	2	6	3	+3	3
San Marino	3	0	0	3	0	15	−15	0

(H) Hosts

2006 – 10-04

Norway	5–0	San Marino
Elyonuoussi 4', 50'; Parr 32'; Roberts 60', 81'

Nadderud, Oslo
Referee: Stanislav Todorov (Bulgaria)

2006 – 10-04

Portugal	1–0	Latvia
F. Coentrão 47'

Bislett, Oslo
Referee: Mark Clattenburg (England)

2006 – 10-06

Norway	2–1	Latvia
Lekven 18'; Roberts 23'		Gauracs 51'

Bislett, Oslo
Referee: Libor Kovařík (Czech Republic)

2006 – 10-06

San Marino	0–5	Portugal
		Rui Pedro 22'; Nogueira 23', 58', 82'; F. Coentrão 77'

Nadderud, Oslo
Referee: Stanislav Todorov (Bulgaria)

2006 – 10-09

Portugal	2–2	Norway
F. Coentrão 27' (pen.); Lourenço 82'		Roberts 24'; Parr 61'

Nadderud, Oslo
Referee: Mark Clattenburg (England)

2006 – 10-09

Latvia	5–0	San Marino
Solovjovs 10'; Gauracs 34'; Turkovs 54'; Kazura 64'; Tarasovs 73'

Bislett, Oslo
Referee: Libor Kovařík (Czech Republic)

=== Group 12 ===
Team	Pld	W	D	L	GF	GA	GD	Pts
Serbia	3	2	1	0	10	3	+7	7
Croatia	3	2	1	0	7	2	+5	7
Moldova	3	1	0	2	3	7	−4	3
Lithuania (H)	3	0	0	3	0	8	−8	0

(H) Hosts

2006 – 10–17

Serbia	4–1	Moldova
Ubiparip 4'; Karišik 33'; Živanović 62', 90+1'		Bondarciuc 55'

S. Darius & S. Girenas, Kaunas
Referee: Mark Steven Whitby (Wales)

2006 – 10–17

Croatia	2–0	Lithuania
Kalinić 16'; Savickas 45' (o.g.)

Sūduva Stadium, Marijampolė
Referee: Thorsten Kinhöfer (Germany)

2006 – 10–19

Croatia	3–0	Moldova
Kalinić 51' (pen.), 71', 90'

S. Darius & S. Girenas, Kaunas
Referee: Mark Steven Whitby (Wales)

2006 – 10–19

Lithuania	0–4	Serbia
		Sulejmani 39'; Bosančić 68'; Milovac 75'; Ubiparip 79'

Sūduva Stadium, Marijampolė
Referee: Johannes Valgeirsson (Iceland)

2006 – 10–22

Serbia	2–2	Croatia
Sulejmani 40'; Bosančić 74'		Rašić 35'; Turkalj 59'

S. Darius & S. Girenas, Kaunas
Referee: Thorsten Kinhöfer (Germany)

2006 – 10–22

Moldova	2–0	Lithuania
Livandovschi 41'; Potlog 84'

Sūduva Stadium, Marijampolė
Referee: Johannes Valgeirsson (Iceland)

== 3rd place table ==
The best third-placed team was determined by the results against the top two teams of the same group.

Grp	Team	Pld	W	D	L	GF	GA	GD	Pts
6	Iceland	2	1	0	1	2	2	0	3
5	Albania	2	1	0	1	3	4	−1	3
1	Ukraine	2	0	1	1	1	2	−1	1
8	Malta	2	0	1	1	3	5	−2	1
10	Luxembourg	2	0	1	1	2	5	−3	1
11	Latvia	2	0	0	2	1	3	−2	0
4	Belgium	2	0	0	2	4	7	−3	0
7	Armenia	2	0	0	2	2	6	−4	0
2	Slovenia	2	0	0	2	1	5	−4	0
3	Belarus	2	0	0	2	2	7	−5	0
12	Moldova	2	0	0	2	1	7	−6	0
9	Estonia	2	0	0	2	2	11	−9	0
