= 2007 UEFA European Under-19 Championship elite qualification =

UEFA U-19 Championship 2007 (Elite Round) is the second round of qualification for the final tournament of the 2007 UEFA European Under-19 Championship. Spain, Italy, and England automatically qualified for this round. The winners of each group joined hosts Austria at the final tournament.

== Matches ==
=== Group 1 ===
Team	Pld	W	D	L	GF	GA	GD	Pts
Germany	3	2	1	0	3	0	+3	7
Republic of Ireland (H)	3	2	0	1	5	1	+4	6
Hungary	3	0	2	1	1	3	−2	2
Bulgaria	3	0	1	2	1	6	−5	1

(H) Hosts
14 May 2007

Hungary	0–0	Germany

Carlisle Grounds, Dublin
Referee: Kevin Blom (Netherlands)

14 May 2007

Republic of Ireland	3–0	Bulgaria
Rooney 2', 6', 15'

United Park, Drogheda
Referee: Bruno Miguel Duarte Paixao (Portugal)

16 May 2007

Hungary	1–1	Bulgaria
Németh 55'		Baltanov 49'

Belfield Park, Dublin
Referee: Kevin Blom (Netherlands)

16 May 2007

Germany	1–0	Republic of Ireland
Ben-Hatira 17' (pen.)

Dalymount Park, Dublin
Referee: Paolo Tagliavento (Italy)

19 May 2007

Republic of Ireland	2–0	Hungary
Sheridan 85'; Ryan 90'

United Park, Drogheda
Referee: Bruno Miguel Duarte Paixão (Portugal)

19 May 2007

Bulgaria	0–2	Germany
		Schmidt 23'; Sam 29'

Belfield Park, Dublin
Referee: Paolo Tagliavento (Italy)

=== Group 2 ===
Team	Pld	W	D	L	GF	GA	GD	Pts
Greece (H)	3	2	1	0	8	2	+6	7
Croatia	3	1	2	0	6	4	+2	5
Italy	3	1	0	2	6	7	−1	3
Sweden	3	0	1	2	3	10	−7	1

(H) Hosts
1 June 2007

Italy	5–2	Sweden
Carbonaro 4'; Hellman 39' (o.g.); Cia 58' 90+2'; Forestieri 89'	Report	Elm 3'; Almebäck 21'

FC Katerini, Katerini
Referee: Felix Brych (Germany)

1 June 2007

Croatia	2–2	Greece
Bagarić 13'; Hudorović 89'		Mitroglou 56', 69'

Municipal, Litochoro
Referee: Martin Atkinson (England)

3 June 2007

Italy	0–2	Greece
	Report	Siovas 61'; Mitroglou 75'

Municipal, Litochoro
Referee: Alexei Nikolaev (Russia)

3 June 2007

Sweden	1–1	Croatia
Olsson 90+3'		Bodul 86'

FC Katerini, Katerini
Referee: Martin Atkinson (England)

6 June 2007

Croatia	3–1	Italy
Jusufi 69'; Ljubičić 79'; Turkalj 89'	Report	Forestieri 38'

FC Katerini, Katerini
Referee: Felix Brych (Germany)

6 June 2007

Greece	4–0	Sweden
Papastathopoulos 53'; Mitroglou 81'; Papazoglou 82'; Bahtiri 89'

Municipal, Litochoro
Referee: Alexei Nikolaev (Russia)

=== Group 3 ===
Team	Pld	W	D	L	GF	GA	GD	Pts
Russia	3	2	1	0	5	1	+4	7
Netherlands	3	2	1	0	4	1	+3	7
England (H)	3	1	0	2	3	4	−1	3
Czech Republic	3	0	0	3	1	7	−6	0

(H) Hosts
15 May 2007

Czech Republic	0–2	Netherlands
		Brouwer 26', 35'

Pirelli Stadium, Burton-on-Trent
Referee: Peter Rasmussen (Denmark)

15 May 2007

England	0–2	Russia
		Mamaev 31'; Dzyuba 74'

Bescot, Walsall
Referee: Antonio Rubinos Perez (Spain)

17 May 2007

Russia	3–1	Czech Republic
Salugin 51'; Kuznetsov 86'; Andreev 88'		Necid 69'

The Lane, Worcester
Referee: Claudio Circhetta (Switzerland)

17 May 2007

England	1–2	Netherlands
Ephraim 90+1'		Golbourne 30' (o.g.); Buijs 71' (pen.)

Ricoh Arena, Coventry
Referee: Antonio Rubinos Perez (Spain)

20 May 2007

Czech Republic	0–2	England
		Lindfield 12'; Martin 49' (pen.)

Sixfields Stadium, Northampton
Referee: Claudio Circhetta (Switzerland)

20 May 2007

Netherlands	0–0	Russia

Ricoh Arena, Coventry
Referee: Peter Rasmussen (Denmark)

=== Group 4 ===
Team	Pld	W	D	L	GF	GA	GD	Pts
Portugal	3	2	1	0	5	2	+3	7
Turkey	3	1	1	1	3	3	0	4
Scotland (H)	3	1	0	2	5	7	−2	3
Georgia	3	0	2	1	2	3	−1	2

(H) Hosts
23 May 2007

Scotland	1–2	Turkey
Pearce 79'		Ceylan 61'; Köse 81'

Dens Park, Dundee
Referee: Tony Chapron (France)

23 May 2007

Portugal	0–0	Georgia

McDiarmid Park, Perth
Referee: Svein Oddvar Moen (Norway)

25 May 2007

Scotland	2–1	Georgia
McLaren 36'; Pearce 88'		Barabadze 6'

McDiarmid Park, Perth
Referee: Svein Oddvar Moen (Norway)

25 May 2007

Turkey	0–1	Portugal
		Coentrão 60'

Dens Park, Dundee
Referee: Pavel Olsiak (Slovakia)

28 May 2007

Portugal	4–2	Scotland
Coentrão 60'; Rui Pedro 45+1'; Santos 79'; Candeias 90+7'		Pearce 78'; Smith 88'

McDiarmid Park, Perth
Referee: Tony Chapron (France)

28 May 2007

Georgia	1–1	Turkey
Tsinamdzgvrishvili 79'		Keles 90'

Dens Park, Dundee
Referee: Pavel Olsiak (Slovakia)

=== Group 5 ===
Team	Pld	W	D	L	GF	GA	GD	Pts
Spain	3	3	0	0	12	4	+8	9
Iceland	3	1	0	2	10	9	+1	3
Norway (H)	3	1	0	2	7	10	−3	3
Azerbaijan	3	1	0	2	4	10	−6	3

(H) Hosts
30 May 2007

Spain	3–2	Iceland
Adrián L. 49'; Mata 73', 79' (pen.)		Friðgeirsson 23'; Viðarsson 90+2' (pen.)

Halden Stadium, Halden
Referee: Marijo Strahonja (Croatia)

30 May 2007

Norway	1–2	Azerbaijan
Parr 41'		Staw 56' (o.g); Hajiyev 90+2'

Sarpsborg Stadion, Sarpsborg
Referee: Thomas Einwaller (Austria)

1 June 2007

Spain	4–0	Azerbaijan
Aarón 40'; Mata 77', 90+3'; Adrián G. 89'

Sarpsborg Stadion, Sarpsborg
Referee: Andrejs Sipailo (Latvia)

1 June 2007

Iceland	3–4	Norway
Smárason 15'; Friðgeirsson 30'; Viðarsson 52' (pen.)		Roberts 11', 13', 55'; Kleiven 27'

Halden Stadium, Halden
Referee: Marijo Strahonja (Croatia)

4 June 2007

Norway	2–5	Spain
Lekven 37'; Knudtzon 50'		Aarón 31'; Mata 66'; Adrián L. 78', 88' (pen.); Adrián G. 85'

Fredrikstad Stadion, Fredrikstad
Referee: Thomas Einwaller (Austria)

4 June 2007

Azerbaijan	2–5	Iceland
Amirguliyev 54' (pen.); Mammadov 74'		Viðarsson 37', 41' (pen.); Smárason 45'; Gíslason 49', 76'

Halden Stadium, Halden
Referee: Andrejs Sipailo (Latvia)

=== Group 6 ===
Team	Pld	W	D	L	GF	GA	GD	Pts
France	3	2	0	1	6	3	+3	6
Israel (H)	3	2	0	1	11	4	+7	6
Poland	3	1	0	2	4	8	−4	3
Slovakia	3	1	0	2	2	8	−6	3

(H) Hosts
8 May 2007

Israel	6–0	Slovakia
Buzaglo 4'; Tamuz 17'; Azriel 50'; Natcho 59'; Biton 86', 90'

Ness Ziona Stadium, Ness Ziona
Referee: César Muñiz Fernández (Spain)

8 May 2007

France	3–1	Poland
Pinau 6'; Capoue 82'; Gestede 85'		Grosicki 26'

Haberfeld Stadium, Rishon LeZion
Referee: Sascha Kever (Switzerland)

10 May 2007

Israel	4–1	Poland
Tamuz 16'; Kayal 56'; Azriel 66', 90+2'		Grosicki 35'

Ness Ziona Stadium, Ness Ziona
Referee: Fırat Aydınus (Turkey)

10 May 2007

Slovakia	1–0	France
Grendel 58'

Haberfeld Stadium, Rishon LeZion
Referee: César Muñiz Fernández (Spain)

13 May 2007

France	3–1	Israel
Monnet-Paquet 4', 73'; N'Goyi 12'		Buzaglo 76'

Ness Ziona Stadium, Ness Ziona
Referee: Sascha Kever (Switzerland)

13 May 2007

Poland	2–1	Slovakia
Grosicki 60' (pen.); Kostrubała 87'		Hlohovski 77'

Haberfeld Stadium, Rishon LeZion
Referee: Fırat Aydınus (Turkey)

=== Group 7 ===
Team	Pld	W	D	L	GF	GA	GD	Pts
Serbia	3	3	0	0	5	1	+4	9
Romania	3	2	0	1	7	5	+2	6
Switzerland (H)	3	1	0	2	4	5	−1	3
Denmark	3	0	0	3	2	7	−5	0

(H) Hosts
31 May 2007

Romania	4–2	Switzerland
Buhăescu 23'; Rusescu 59' (pen.); Bicfalvi 70'; Ganea 89' (pen.)		Derdiyok 14'; Shkelzen 42'

Brühl Stadium, Grenchen
Referee: Nicola Rizzoli (Italy)

31 May 2007

Serbia	2–1	Denmark
Sulejmani 13'; Tadić 22'		Nielsen 10'

Gurzelen Stadium, Biel
Referee: Olivier Thual (France)

2 June 2007

Switzerland	0–1	Serbia
		Sulejmani 34'

St. Léonard Stadium, Fribourg
Referee: Nicola Rizzoli (Italy)

2 June 2007

Romania	3–1	Denmark
Buhăescu 4'; Ganea 8', 38' (pen.)		Andersen 90+3'

Brühl Stadium, Grenchen
Referee: Mark Courtney (Northern Ireland)

5 June 2007

Serbia	2–0	Romania
Fejsa 8'; Bosančić 13'

St. Léonard Stadium, Fribourg
Referee: Mark Courtney (Northern Ireland)

5 June 2007

Denmark	0–2	Switzerland
		Derdiyok 82'; Shkelzen 84'

Gurzelen Stadium, Biel
Referee: Olivier Thual (France)

== See also ==
- 2007 UEFA European Under-19 Championship
- 2007 UEFA European Under-19 Championship qualification
