= 2007 Copa del Rey Juvenil =

Tournament details
- Country: Spain
- Teams: 16

Final positions
- Champions: Albacete
- Runners-up: Valencia

Tournament statistics
- Matches played: 29
- Goals scored: 74 (2.55 per match)

The 2007 Copa del Rey Juvenil was the 57th staging of the tournament. The competition began on May 6, 2007 and ended on June 24, 2007 with the final.

Albacete defeated Valencia in the final.

== First round ==
Team 1	Agg.	Team 2	1st leg	2nd leg
Espanyol	1–2	Valencia	1–1	0–1
Albacete	3–2	FC Barcelona	2–1	1–1
Danok Bat	2–5	Deportivo	0–3	2–2
Antiguoko	2–5	Racing de Santander	2–1	0–4
Celta de Vigo	2–4	Real Sociedad	1–2	1–2
Gáldar	2–4	Málaga	2–0	0–4
Sevilla	6–2	Atlético Madrileño	4–0	2–2
Real Madrid	1–2	Betis	0–1	1–1

== Quarterfinals ==
Team 1	Agg.	Team 2	1st leg	2nd leg
Betis	2–3	Real Sociedad	1–0	1–3
Málaga	2–2 (a)	Albacete	2–1	0–1
Racing de Santander	4–2	Sevilla	3–0	1–2
Valencia	2–0	Deportivo	1–0	1–0

== Semifinals ==
Team 1	Agg.	Team 2	1st leg	2nd leg
Albacete	4–2	Real Sociedad	3–1	1–1
Racing de Santander	1–2	Valencia	1–0	0–2

== Final ==
24 June 2007
12:00

Valencia	1–2	Albacete
Pierrick 81'	Report	Gil 19'; Carletes 82'

Fernando Ruiz Hierro, Vélez-Málaga
Referee: José Luis Parada Romero

Valencia FC:
GK	(Spain) Salva
DF	(Spain) Lillo (substituted off) 85'
DF	(Spain) Alexis Villar (yellow card)
DF	(Spain) Arturo Navarro
DF	(Spain) Yago (substituted off) 48'
MF	(Spain) Carles (substituted off) 60'
MF	(Spain) Ximo Navarro
MF	(Spain) Ángel Montoro (yellow card)
FW	(Cameroon) Aser Pierrick
FW	(Spain) Daniel Olcina
FW	(Spain) Moraga (substituted off) 48'
Substitutes:
DF	(Spain) Jaume Costa (substituted on) 48'
FW	(Spain) Juan Carlos (substituted on) 48'
MF	(Spain) Ximo Forner (substituted on) 60'
MF	(Spain) David Timor (substituted on) 85'
Manager:
(Spain) Óscar Fernández

Albacete Balompié:
GK	(Spain) Pablo
DF	(Spain) Joaquín
DF	(Spain) López
DF	(Spain) Omar
DF	(Spain) Pablo Gil (yellow card)
MF	(Spain) Javier Matilla
MF	(Spain) Ritchie Kitoko (yellow card)
MF	(Spain) Chema (substituted off) 49'
MF	(Spain) Rubén (red card) 30'
FW	(Spain) Carletes (yellow card) (substituted off) 88'
FW	(Spain) Isma (substituted off) 85'
Substitutes:
MF	(Spain) Carrasco (substituted on) 88'
MF	(Spain) Arturo (substituted on) 49'
MF	(Spain) Juanjo (substituted on) 85'
Manager:
(Spain) Antonio Gómez

Copa del Generalísimo
Winners
Albacete
