= 2007 UEFA European Under-19 Championship =

U-19-Fußball-Europameisterschaft 2007

Tournament details
- Host country: Austria
- Dates: 16–27 July
- Teams: 8 (from 1 confederation)
- Venue: 4 (in 4 host cities)

Final positions
- Champions: Spain (7th title)
- Runners-up: Greece

Tournament statistics
- Top scorer(s): (Germany) Änis Ben-Hatira (Greece) Kostas Mitroglou (France) Kévin Monnet-Paquet (3 goals)
- Best player: (Greece) Sotiris Ninis

The UEFA U-19 Championship 2007 Final Tournament was held in Austria with matches played from 16–27 July 2007. Players born after 1 January 1988 were eligible to participate in this competition.

The draw was made on 13 June 2007. The venues were the Linzer Stadion in Linz, the Waldstadion in Pasching, the Fill Metallbau Stadion in Ried im Innkreis and the Vorwärts-Stadion in Steyr.

== Qualification ==
Qualification for the final tournament was played over two stages:

- 2007 UEFA European Under-19 Championship qualification – 1 July 2006 – 21 December 2006
- 2007 UEFA European Under-19 Championship elite qualification – 8 May 2007 – 6 June 2007

== Squads ==
For the complete list of players, see 2007 UEFA European Under-19 Championship squads

== Finals group stage ==
In the following tables:

Key: Pld Matches played, W Won, D Drawn, L Lost, GF Goals for, GA Goals against, GD Goal Difference, Pts Points

Legend
Advanced to semi-finals

All times are Central European Time (UTC+2)

=== Group A ===
| Team | Pld | W | D | L | GF | GA | GD | Pts |
|---|---|---|---|---|---|---|---|---|
| Spain | 3 | 1 | 2 | 0 | 3 | 1 | +2 | 5 |
| Greece | 3 | 1 | 2 | 0 | 2 | 1 | +1 | 5 |
| Portugal | 3 | 1 | 1 | 1 | 3 | 2 | +1 | 4 |
| Austria | 3 | 0 | 1 | 2 | 1 | 5 | −4 | 1 |

16 July 2007
17:15

| Greece | 1–0 | Portugal |
|---|---|---|
| Mitroglou 52' | Report |

Linzer Stadion, Linz
Referee: Oleh Oriekhov (Ukraine)
16 July 2007
20:00

| Austria | 0–2 | Spain |
|---|---|---|
| | Report | Azpilicueta 52'; Aarón 55' |

Linzer Stadion, Linz
Referee: Kevin Blom (Netherlands)

18 July 2007
18:00

| Spain | 1–1 | Portugal |
|---|---|---|
| Aarón 54' (pen.) | Report | Carriço 71' |

Vorwärts-Stadion, Steyr
Referee: Cüneyt Çakır (Turkey)
18 July 2007
20:00

| Austria | 1–1 | Greece |
|---|---|---|
| Beichler 61' (pen.) | Report | Mitroglou 15' |

Waldstadion, Pasching
Referee: Claudio Circhetta (Switzerland)

21 July 2007
18:00

| Spain | 0–0 | Greece |
|---|---|---|
| | Report |

Linzer Stadion, Linz
Referee: Peter Rasmussen (Denmark)
21 July 2007
18:00

| Portugal | 2–0 | Austria |
|---|---|---|
| Bura 51'; Carriço 70' | Report |

Fill Metallbau Stadion, Ried
Referee: Pavel Královec (Czech Republic)

=== Group B ===
| Team | Pld | W | D | L | GF | GA | GD | Pts |
|---|---|---|---|---|---|---|---|---|
| Germany | 3 | 2 | 1 | 0 | 7 | 5 | +2 | 7 |
| France | 3 | 1 | 2 | 0 | 6 | 3 | +3 | 5 |
| Serbia | 3 | 1 | 0 | 2 | 10 | 10 | 0 | 3 |
| Russia | 3 | 0 | 1 | 2 | 4 | 9 | −5 | 1 |

16 July 2007
18:00

| France | 5–2 | Serbia |
|---|---|---|
| Monnet-Paquet 37', 44', 76'; Martin 51', 90+2' (pen.) | Report | Sulejmani 23' (pen.); Marjanović 35' |

Fill Metallbau Stadion, Ried
Referee: Cüneyt Çakır (Turkey)
16 July 2007
18:00

| Germany | 3–2 | Russia |
|---|---|---|
| Petersen 11'; Özil 14'; Kruse 66' | Report | Dzyuba 58', 90+2' |

Vorwärts-Stadion, Steyr
Referee: Peter Rasmussen (Denmark)

18 July 2007
17:15

| Russia | 2–6 | Serbia |
|---|---|---|
| Dyadyun 42', 60' | Report | Marjanović 11'; Bosančić 24'; Tadić 47', 57'; Marinković 80', 88' |

Waldstadion, Pasching
Referee: Pavel Královec (Czech Republic)
18 July 2007
20:00

| Germany | 1–1 | France |
|---|---|---|
| Özil 5' | Report | Baysse 72' |

Fill Metallbau Stadion, Ried
Referee: Oleh Oriekhov (Ukraine)

21 July 2007
20:00

| Serbia | 2–3 | Germany |
|---|---|---|
| Bosančić 2'; Feick 90+2' (o.g.) | Report | Ben-Hatira 53'; Kruse 84'; Sam 90+3' |

Waldstadion, Pasching
Referee: Claudio Circhetta (Switzerland)
21 July 2007
20:00

| Russia | 0–0 | France |
|---|---|---|
| | Report |

Vorwärts-Stadion, Steyr
Referee: Kevin Blom (Netherlands)

== Knockout stage ==
Semi-finals
24 July — Steyr
Germany | 2
Greece | 3
24 July — Pasching
Spain (pen.) | 0 (4)
France | 0 (2)

Final
27 July — Linz
Greece | 0
Spain | 1

=== Semi-finals ===
24 July 2007
17:30

| Germany | 2–3 | Greece |
|---|---|---|
| Ben-Hatira 25', 65' (pen.) | Report | Ninis 40'; Mitroglou 58'; Lampropoulos 90' |

Vorwärts-Stadion, Steyr
Referee: Kevin Blom (Netherlands)

24 July 2007
20:30

| Spain | 0–0 (a.e.t.) | France |
|---|---|---|
| | Report |
Penalties
| Aarón (penalty scored); Martínez (penalty scored); Cantero (penalty scored); San José (penalty scored) | 4–2 | (penalty scored) Plessis; (penalty scored) N'Goyi; (penalty missed) Monnet-Paquet; (penalty missed) Othon |

Waldstadion, Pasching
Referee: Pavel Královec (Czech Republic)

=== Final ===
27 July 2007
20:30

| Greece | 0–1 | Spain |
|---|---|---|
| | Report | Parejo 38' |

Linzer Stadion, Linz
Attendance: 7,200
Referee: Claudio Circhetta (Switzerland)

=== Teams ===
GREECE :
| GK | 12 | Kiriakos Stratilatis |
| RB | 2 | Michail Boukouvalas |
| CB | 3 | Vasilis Apostolopoulos |
| CB | 5 | Manolis Moniakis |
| LB | 8 | Giorgos Ioannidis |
| RWB | 7 | Sotiris Ninis | (substituted off) 51' |
| CM | 6 | Georgios Siakkas |
| CM | 10 | Andreas Lampropoulos | (substituted off) 75' |
| CM | 16 | Giannis Papadopoulos |
| LWB | 17 | Elini Dimoutsos | (substituted off) 48' |
| CF | 11 | Kostas Mitroglou |
Substitutes:
| GK | 1 | Ilias Vouras |
| DF | 18 | Dimitris Siovas | (substituted on) 48' |
| MF | 15 | Anastasios Papazoglou |
| MF | 13 | Vasilios Koutsianikoulis | (substituted on) 75' |
| FW | 9 | Athanasios Papazoglou | (substituted on) 51' |
Manager:
Nikos Nioplias

SPAIN:
| GK | 13 | Sergio Asenjo |
| CB | 2 | Víctor Díaz |
| CB | 3 | Javi Cantero |
| CB | 5 | Ion Echaide |
| RWB | 12 | Pablo Gil |
| CM | 14 | Mikel San José |
| CM | 7 | César Azpilicueta |
| CM | 11 | Carles Coto | (substituted off) 64' |
| LWB | 15 | Dani Parejo | (substituted off) 81' |
| CF | 9 | Emilio Nsue | (substituted off) 64' |
| CF | 10 | Aarón |
Substitutes:
| GK | 19 | Isaac Becerra |
| DF | 17 | José Zamora | (substituted on) 64' |
| MF | 4 | Javier Modrego |
| MF | 16 | Carlos Martínez | (substituted on) 64' |
| FW | 18 | Jesús Berrocal | (substituted on) 81' |
Manager:
Juan Santisteban

== Winners ==
2007 UEFA U-19 European champions

Spain
Seventh title

== Top goalscorers ==
| Scorer | Goals | Nation |
|---|---|---|
| Kostas Mitroglou | 3 | Greece |
| Änis Ben-Hatira | 3 | Germany |
| Kévin Monnet-Paquet | 3 | France |
| Malaury Martin | 2 | France |
| Mesut Özil | 2 | Germany |
| Max Kruse | 2 | Germany |
| Daniel Carriço | 2 | Portugal |
| Aarón | 2 | Spain |
| Miloš Bosančić | 2 | Serbia |
| Nenad Marinković | 2 | Serbia |
| Rodoljub Marjanović | 2 | Serbia |
| Dušan Tadić | 2 | Serbia |
| Artyom Dzyuba | 2 | Russia |
| Vladimir Dyadyun | 2 | Russia |
