= Rodoljub =

Rodoljub (Serbian: Родољуб) is a Serbian masculine given name. It may refer to:

- Rodoljub Čolaković (1900–1983), communist politician
- Rodoljub Marjanović (born 1988), footballer
- Rodoljub Paunović (born 1985), footballer
- Rodoljub "Roki" Vulovic (born 1955), singer
