= Christian Sánchez =

Christian Sánchez may refer to:

- Christian Sánchez (footballer) (born 1989), Mexican football defender
- Christian Nava Sánchez (born 1982), Mexican politician

== See also ==
- Cristián Sánchez (disambiguation)
