= Cristián Sánchez =

Cristián Sánchez may refer to:

- Cristián Sánchez (director) (born 1951), Chilean film director
- Cristián Sánchez (footballer) (born 1991), Argentine footballer
- Cristián Sánchez (presenter) (born 1972), Chilean presenter

== See also ==
- Christian Sánchez (disambiguation)
