= Javier Modrego =

Spanish footballer

Personal information
- Full name: Javier Modrego Casado
- Date of birth: 19 January 1988 (age 38)
- Place of birth: Soria, Spain
- Height: 1.78 m (5 ft 10 in)
- Position: Midfielder

Youth career
- Valladolid

Senior career*
Years	Team	Apps	(Gls)
2006–2007	Valladolid B	35	(1)
2007–2010	Real Madrid B	25	(0)
2010	→ Villarreal B (loan)	1	(0)
2010–2011	Getafe B	18	(0)
2011–2012	Rayo Majadahonda	?	(1)

International career
2006–2007	Spain U19	12	(1)
- * Club domestic league appearances and goals as of 3 June 2012

Javier Modrego Casado (also known as ‘Modre’) (born 19 January 1988 in Soria, Castile and León, Spain) is a retired Spanish footballer who played as a midfielder. He is working as Technical Director of Numancia.

== Honours ==
Spain U19

- UEFA U-19 Championship: 2007
