= Christian Nava Sánchez =

Mexican politician

- Born: 10 December 1982 (age 43); Cuautla, Morelos, Mexico
- Other name: El Mantecas
- Education: None
- Occupation: Politician
- Political party: PRI

Christian Alejandro Nava Sánchez (born 10 December 1982) is a Mexican politician from the Institutional Revolutionary Party. In 2012 he served as Deputy of the LXI Legislature of the Mexican Congress representing Morelos.
