= Pablo Gil =

Spanish footballer

Personal information
- Full name: Pablo Gil Sarrión
- Date of birth: 8 October 1988 (age 38)
- Place of birth: Murcia, Spain
- Height: 1.75 m (5 ft 9 in)
- Position: Defender

Team information
- Current team: Colmenar Viejo (Manager)

Youth career
- 1995–2007: Albacete

Senior career*
Years	Team	Apps	(Gls)
2007–2010	Albacete	37	(1)
2010–2012	Real Madrid B	22	(1)
2012–2013	Sparta Prague	2	(0)
2013	→ Albacete (loan)	13	(0)
2013–2014	→ Caudal (loan)	18	(1)
2015	Alcobendas Sport	7	(0)
2015–2016	Mérida	11	(0)
2016–2017	Internacional Madrid	26	(3)
2017–2018	FC 08 Villingen	24	(3)
2018–2020	TSG Balingen	22	(0)
2020–2022	Colmenar Viejo		

International career
2007	Spain U19	5	(0)

Managerial career
- 2023–: Colmenar Viejo
- * Club domestic league appearances and goals

Pablo Gil Sarrión (born 8 October 1988) is a retired Spanish footballer who played as a central defender, and current manager of Spanish club Colmenar Viejo.

He played 37 Segunda División matches for Albacete at the start of his career, followed by 87 in Segunda División B for four teams, and also had a brief spell with Sparta Prague in the Czech Republic.

== Club career ==
Born in Murcia, Gil joined Albacete Balompié at the age of six, going on to represent all of its youth leagues. In 2007, he was promoted to the first team, eventually appearing in three full Segunda División seasons with the club; his debut in the competition was on 26 August 2007, playing 28 minutes in a 0–1 home loss against Elche CF.

Even though he initially denied it in March 2010, Gil signed for two years with Real Madrid Castilla and, in the ensuing off-season, played two Segunda División B campaigns with Real Madrid's reserves. He was featured in just 15 games in his second one (14 in the regular season plus one in playoffs, as he returned to the second level after five years.

Gil agreed to a three-year contract with AC Sparta Prague in the summer of 2012, becoming the first Spaniard to ever play for the team. He returned to his country and Albacete in the following transfer window, however, only on loan; in 2017, Czech news site iSport named him as second worst foreign player to appear in the Czech First League.

In September 2013 Gil was again loaned to his country's third tier, this time to Caudal Deportivo, and played four matches (one start) as they were relegated. He left halfway through their Tercera División campaign for Fútbol Alcobendas Sport in January 2015, before stepping up a level to Mérida AD that August.

After a year back in the fourth tier with CF Internacional de Madrid, Gil went abroad again in June 2017 to join FC 08 Villingen of the Oberliga Baden-Württemberg (fifth German level) alongside compatriot Cristián Sánchez. A year later, he was signed by TSG Balingen in the Regionalliga, one step higher.

== International career ==
Gil's only international caps for Spain were all five matches for the under-19 team at the 2007 UEFA European Championship in Austria. The team won the title with a single goal in the final against Greece at the Linzer Stadion on 27 July.

== Coaching career ==
In August 2020, alongside playing a bit for Spanish club Colmenar Viejo, Gil worked as head coach for Getafe CF's U-19 varsity team and later also at the Escuela de Fútbol AFE.

In October 2022 it was confirmed, that Gil, from January 2023, would take charge of German club FC Bad Dürrheim. However, it emerged in early January 2023 that Gil would not be the club's new coach after all, as he had received a professional coaching job offer in Spain. In March 2023, he was hired as manager of Colmenar Viejo.

== Honours ==
=== Club ===
Real Madrid Castilla

- Segunda División B: 2011–12

=== International ===
Spain U19

- UEFA European Under-19 Championship: 2007
