= Isma (footballer) =

Spanish footballer

Personal information
- Full name: Ismael Rangel León
- Date of birth: 2 June 1988 (age 38)
- Place of birth: Villarrobledo, Spain
- Height: 1.55 m (5 ft 1 in)
- Position: Winger

Team information
- Current team: Villarrobledo

Youth career
- Villarrobledo
- Fundación Albacete
- Albacete

Senior career*
Years	Team	Apps	(Gls)
2007–2011	Albacete B	72	(7)
2008–2009	→ Alcorcón (loan)	18	(0)
2009–2010	Albacete	4	(0)
2011–2014	Villarrobledo	87	(12)
2014–2015	Arandina	29	(3)
2015–	Villarrobledo	33	(5)
- * Club domestic league appearances and goals as of 30 April 2017

Ismael Rangel León (born 2 June 1988 in Villarrobledo, Albacete), commonly known as Isma, is a Spanish footballer who plays for CP Villarrobledo as a right winger.

== Football career ==
After arriving in the club's youth system, Isma spent several seasons associated with the reserve team in the fourth division. He made his debut with the main squad on 7 November 2009, playing the last minute of a 3–1 away win against Gimnàstic de Tarragona in the second level championship.

In the 2011 summer, after only three more league appearances with the first team (totalling a further 26 minutes), Isma left Alba and joined amateurs CP Villarrobledo also in his native Castile-La Mancha, going on to remain with the club several seasons.
