= Carlos Martínez (footballer, born August 1989) =

Spanish footballer

Personal information
- Full name: Carlos Martínez Aibar
- Date of birth: 29 August 1989 (age 37)
- Place of birth: Cádiz, Spain
- Height: 1.76 m (5 ft 9 in)
- Position: Midfielder

Team information
- Current team: Abano

Youth career
- Cádiz

Senior career*
Years	Team	Apps	(Gls)
2006–2008	Cádiz B	30	(14)
2007	Cádiz	1	(0)
2008–2009	Vöcklabrucker SC	2	(0)
2009–2010	Guijuelo	0	(0)
2010–2012	Chiclana	8	(0)
2013	Bazán	6	(1)
2013–2014	Firpo	8	(0)
2014–2015	Sūduva	15	(3)
2015–2016	Coquimbo Unido	1	(0)
2017	Oliva	1	(0)
2017–	Abano	0	(0)
- * Club domestic league appearances and goals as of 26 November 2017

Carlos Martínez Aibar (born 29 August 1989) is a Spanish footballer who plays as a midfielder for Italian club Abano Calcio.

== Club career ==
Born in Cádiz, Andalusia, Martínez finished his development at local Cádiz CF. On 29 September 2007, at the age of 18, he made his debut with the first team, coming in as a 77th-minute substitute in a 0–2 away loss against CD Castellón.

Martínez moved abroad in 2013, signing with C.D. Luis Ángel Firpo in the Salvadoran Primera División and competing in the CONCACAF Champions League. He switched clubs and countries the following year, joining FK Sūduva in the Lithuanian A Lyga.

In the 2015–16 season, Martínez represented Coquimbo Unido, featuring rarely and also being relegated from the Primera B de Chile. He returned to his homeland on 26 November 2017 and signed with amateurs UD Oliva but, less than one month later, moved to the Italian Serie D with Abano Calcio.

== Personal life ==
Martínez's grandfather, Ramoní, was also a footballer. He represented mainly Sevilla FC.
