= Sebastian Cojocnean =

Romanian footballer

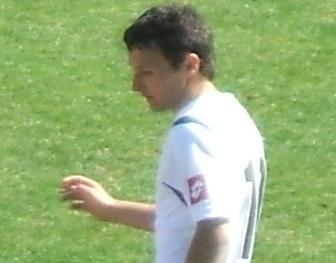
- Cojocnean in 2008.

Personal information
- Full name: Sebastian Cristian Cojocnean
- Date of birth: 11 July 1989 (age 37)
- Place of birth: Câmpia Turzii, Romania
- Height: 1.80 m (5 ft 11 in)
- Position: Midfielder

Youth career
- –2004: Gloria Bistrița

Senior career*
| Years | Team | Apps | (Gls) |
| 2004–2007 | Otopeni | 16 | (3) |
| 2007–2009 | Politehnica II Timișoara | 10 | (1) |
| 2008 | → Sportul Studențesc (loan) | 15 | (2) |
| 2008 | → Buftea (loan) | 9 | (0) |
| 2009 | → Gloria Buzău (loan) | 12 | (0) |
| 2009–2012 | Universitatea Cluj | 43 | (7) |
| 2012–2013 | Petrolul Ploiești | 2 | (0) |
| 2013–2014 | Gaz Metan Mediaș | 7 | (0) |
| 2014–2015 | Rapid București | 8 | (0) |
| 2015 | Monza | 11 | (0) |
| 2015–2016 | Ethnikos Achna | 12 | (0) |
| 2016–2017 | Enosis | 8 | (1) |
- * Club domestic league appearances and goals as of 16 March 2018

Sebastian Cristian Cojocnean (born 11 July 1989) is a Romanian footballer who plays as a midfielder. Cojocnean began his football career at Gloria Bistrița II and during the summer of 2004 he was transferred to Otopeni.

Cojocnean has played in several Romanian national youth teams, up to and including U-21 level. Since his debut he was monitored by many powerful clubs in the Romanian Liga I and from abroad. The player signed a 3-year contract with Politehnica Timișoara in September 2007, after a two-month-long delay, during which he was conflicted with the management at Otopeni.

CS Otopeni received around EUR 400.000 for the player
