= Karol Kostrubała =

Polish footballer

Personal information
- Date of birth: 12 July 1988 (age 38)
- Place of birth: Zamość, Poland
- Height: 1.83 m (6 ft 0 in)
- Position: Midfielder

Youth career
- Hetman Zamość

Senior career*
Years	Team	Apps	(Gls)
2005	Hetman Zamość		
2005–2012	Cracovia	19	(0)
2009	→ Wisła Płock (loan)	4	(0)
2010	→ Dolcan Ząbki (loan)	6	(0)
2011	→ KSZO Ostrowiec (loan)	11	(0)
2012–2013	Motor Lublin	29	(3)
2013–2021	Garbarnia Kraków	151	(9)
- * Club domestic league appearances and goals

Karol Kostrubała (born 12 July 1988) is a Polish former professional footballer who played as a midfielder. He currently works as a scout for Garbarnia Kraków.

== Honours ==
Garbarnia Kraków

- III liga: 2015–16 (Lesser Poland–Świętokrzyskie), 2016–17 (group IV)
