= Valeri Sokolov (footballer) =

Russian footballer (born 1988)

Personal information
- Full name: Valeri Andreyevich Sokolov
- Date of birth: 29 January 1988 (age 38)
- Place of birth: Sverdlovsk, Russian SFSR
- Height: 1.85 m (6 ft 1 in)
- Position: Defender

Youth career
- FC Spartak Moscow

Senior career*
Years	Team	Apps	(Gls)
2005–2006	FC Spartak Moscow	0	(0)
2006	FC Spartak-UGP Anapa	3	(0)
2007	FC Saturn Ramenskoye	0	(0)
2008	FC Torpedo Moscow	8	(0)
2009	FC Rubin-2 Kazan	24	(0)
2010	FC Gornyak Uchaly	12	(0)
- * Club domestic league appearances and goals

Valeri Andreyevich Sokolov (Russian: Валерий Андреевич Соколов; born 29 January 1988) is a former Russian professional football player.

== Club career ==
He played in the Russian Football National League for FC Torpedo Moscow in 2008.
