= Carletes =

Spanish footballer (born 1988)

Personal information
- Full name: Carlos Martínez Arribas
- Date of birth: 26 May 1988 (age 38)
- Place of birth: Albacete, Spain
- Height: 1.73 m (5 ft 8 in)
- Position: Forward

Team information
- Current team: Atlético Ibañés

Youth career
- 1995–2007: Albacete

Senior career*
Years	Team	Apps	(Gls)
2007–2012	Albacete B	55	(12)
2008–2011	Albacete	2	(0)
2011	→ La Gineta (loan)	10	(2)
2012–2013	Hellín	33	(3)
2014	La Gineta	6	(0)
2015–	Atlético Ibañés	13	(3)

International career
2007	Spain U19	2	(0)
Medal record
Representing Spain
UEFA European Under-19 Championship
Winner	2007 Austria
- * Club domestic league appearances and goals as of 1 June 2016

Carlos Martínez Arribas (born 26 May 1988 in Albacete, Castile-La Mancha), a.k.a. Carletes, is a Spanish footballer who plays for Club Atlético Ibañés as a forward.

== Honours ==
Spain U19

- UEFA U-19 Championship: 2007
