= David Schartner =

Austrian footballer

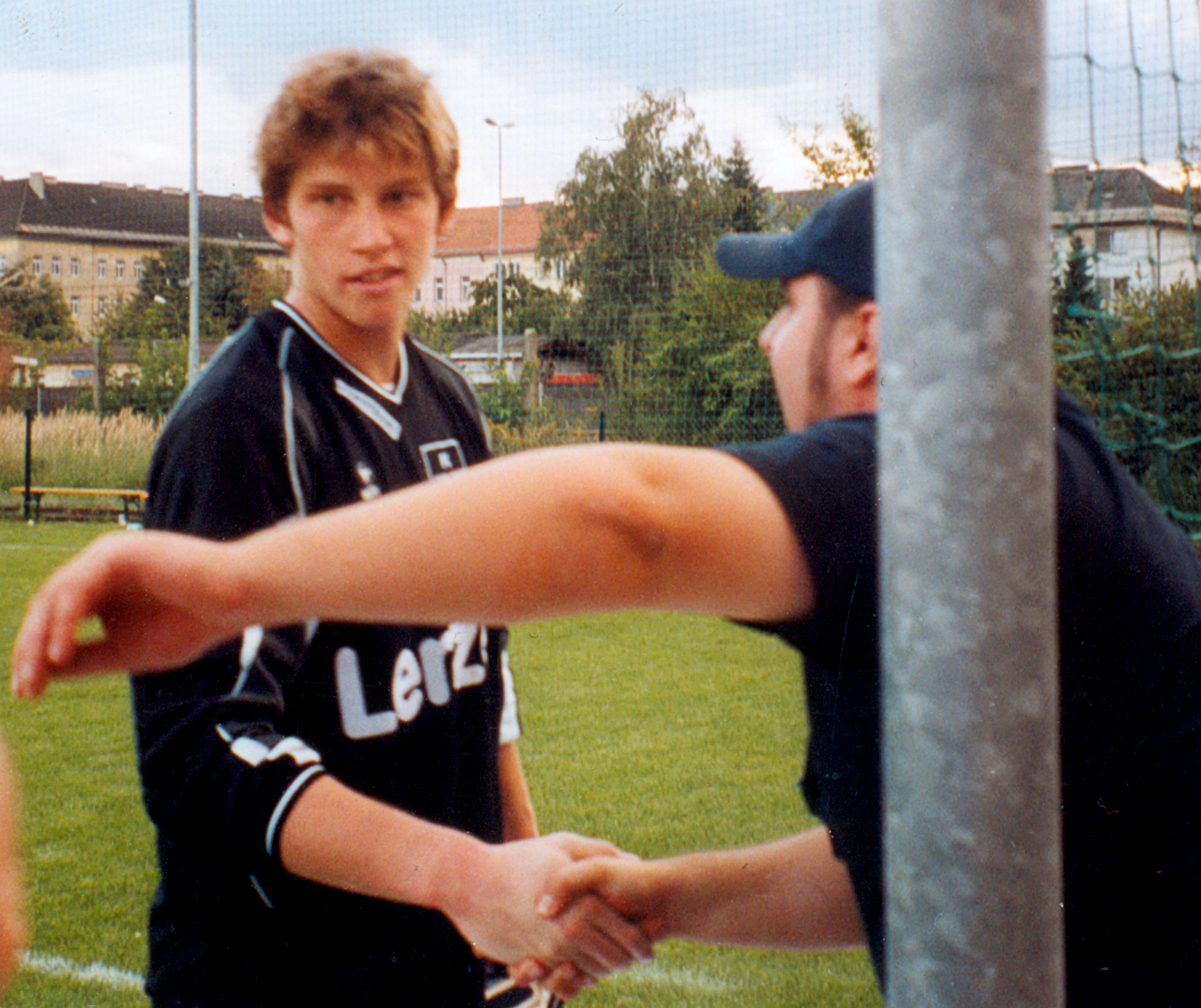
- Schartner (left) in 2005

Personal information
- Full name: David Schartner
- Date of birth: 7 September 1988 (age 38)
- Place of birth: Salzburg, Austria
- Height: 1.93 m (6 ft 4 in)
- Position: Goalkeeper

Team information
- Current team: Red Bull Salzburg (U18 goalkeeping coach)

Youth career
- 2002–2005: Red Bull Salzburg
- 2005–2006: Blau-Weiß Linz
- 2006–2008: Red Bull Salzburg

Senior career*
Years	Team	Apps	(Gls)
2009–2010	Red Bull Salzburg	0	(0)
2010–2013	SV Mattersburg	9	(0)
2012–2013	→ SV Grödig (loan)	0	(0)
2013–2018	TSV Neumarkt		
2019	TSV Neumarkt		
- * Club domestic league appearances and goals

David Schartner (born 7 September 1988) is an Austrian former professional footballer who played as a goalkeeper. He currently works as a goalkeeping coach for Red Bull Salzburg's under-18 team.
