= Arkadiusz Ryś =

Polish footballer (born 1988)

Personal information
- Full name: Arkadiusz Marek Ryś
- Date of birth: 18 June 1988 (age 38)
- Place of birth: Zielona Góra, Poland
- Height: 1.83 m (6 ft 0 in)
- Position: Defender

Youth career
- 2001–2005: UKP Zielona Góra
- 2005–2008: Auxerre

Senior career*
Years	Team	Apps	(Gls)
2008–2009	Auxerre B		
2009–2012	GKS Katowice	19	(0)
2012–2013	Garbarnia Kraków	30	(1)
2013–2015	Okocimski KS Brzesko	58	(0)
2016	KS Raszyn		
2016–2020	Sparta Jazgarzew		

International career
- Poland U17
2006	Poland U19	3	(0)
2007	Poland U21	3	(0)
- * Club domestic league appearances and goals

Arkadiusz Marek Ryś (born 18 June 1988) is a Polish former professional footballer who played as a defender.

== Career ==
Ryś began his career at UKP Zielona Góra, before moving to AJ Auxerre in June 2005. Atter four years, Ryś left the club, and had a trial with SO Châtellerault in July 2009. In the summer of 2009, he joined Polish second-tier club GKS Katowice.
