= Skuli Jonsson =

Canadian ice hockey player (1892–1943)

- Born: September 14, 1892 Selkirk, Manitoba, Canada
- Died: December 28, 1943 (aged 51)
- Position: Forward
- Played for: Quebec Bulldogs
- Playing career: 1908–1920

Skuli Gudmundur "Skull" Jonsson (September 14, 1892 – December 28, 1943) was a Canadian professional ice hockey player. He played with the Quebec Bulldogs of the National Hockey Association (NHA) during the 1915–16 and 1916–17 seasons.
