= Dominic Pürcher =

Austrian footballer (born 1988)

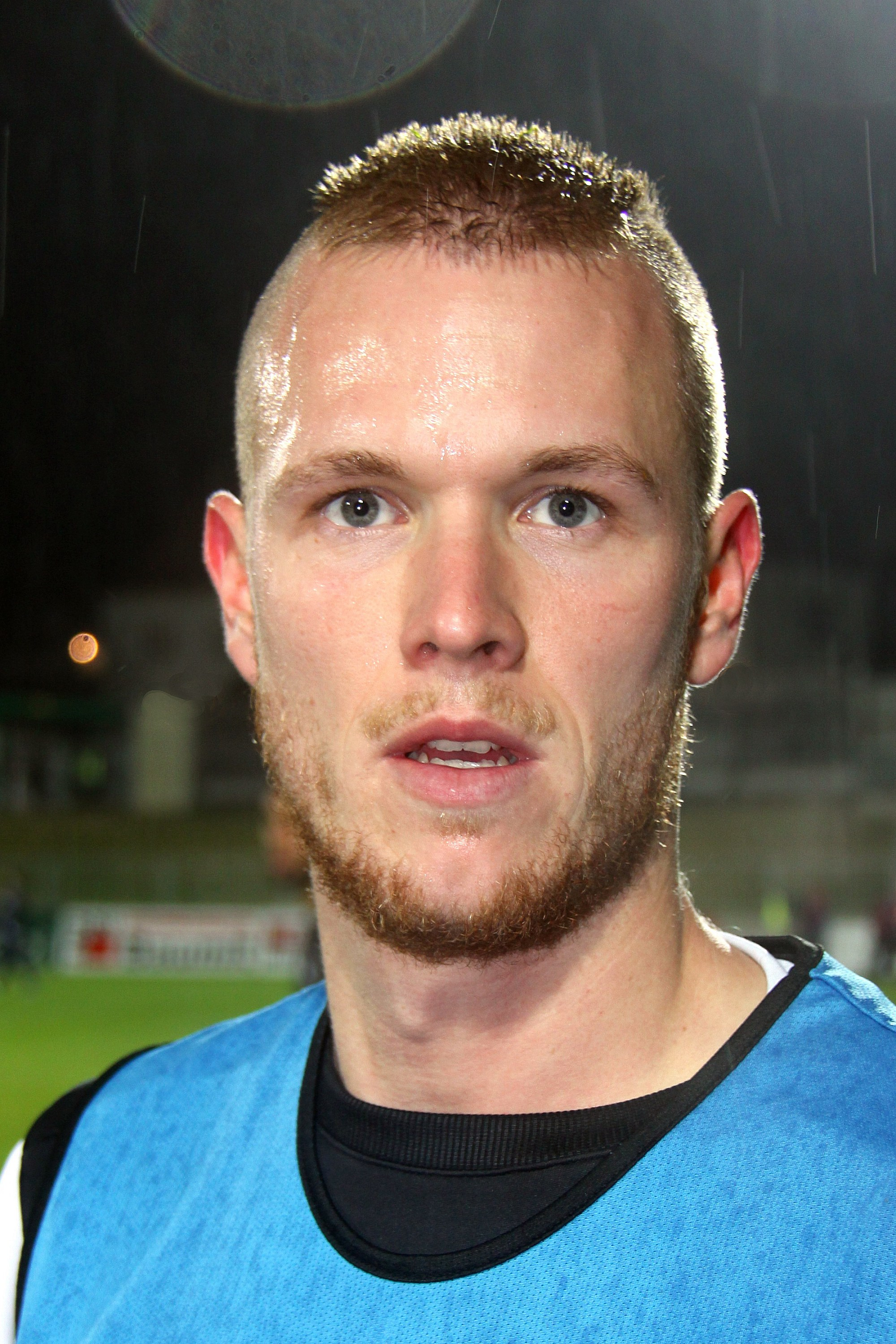

Personal information
- Full name: Dominic Pürcher
- Date of birth: 24 June 1988 (age 38)
- Place of birth: Schladming, Austria
- Height: 1.85 m (6 ft 1 in)
- Position: Defender

Team information
- Current team: SK Austria Klagenfurt
- Number: 4

Youth career
- –2002: FC Schladming Jugend
- 2002–2007: SK Sturm Graz

Senior career*
Years	Team	Apps	(Gls)
2007–2012	Sturm Graz	26	(0)
2008–2009	→ SV Grodig (loan)	25	(1)
2009–2010	→ TSV Hartberg (loan)	29	(1)
2012–2013	Kapfenberger SV	24	(2)
2013–2015	SC Austria Lustenau	54	(1)

International career^{‡}
	Austria U17	10	(0)
2006–2007	Austria U19	15	(0)
2008	Austria U20	4	(0)
2009	Austria U21	2	(0)
- * Club domestic league appearances and goals as of 31 May 2016 ‡ National team caps and goals as of 31 May 2016

Dominic Pürcher (born 24 June 1988 in Schladming) is an Austrian footballer who plays for SC Austria Lustenau.
