= Anastasios Papazoglou =

Greek footballer

Tasos Papazoglou
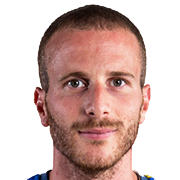

Personal information
- Full name: Anastasios Papazoglou
- Date of birth: 24 September 1988 (age 38)
- Place of birth: Serres, Greece
- Height: 1.80 m (5 ft 11 in)
- Position: Centre-back

Youth career
- 2004–2007: Panserraikos

Senior career*
Years	Team	Apps	(Gls)
2007–2011	Panserraikos	79	(5)
2011–2014	Olympiacos	31	(1)
2014–2015	APOEL	9	(0)
2015	Xanthi	8	(1)
2015–2017	Panetolikos	28	(1)
2017–2018	Apollon Smyrnis	26	(1)
2018–2019	OFI	18	(0)
2019–2020	Zira	10	(0)
2020–2022	Xanthi	42	(1)
2022–2023	Panserraikos	11	(1)

International career^{‡}
2006–2008	Greece U19	3	(0)
2008–2011	Greece U21	8	(1)

Managerial career
- 2023–2024: Panserraikos (sporting director)
- * Club domestic league appearances and goals as of 31 May 2023 ‡ National team caps and goals as of 22 September 2011

Anastasios "Tasos" Papazoglou (Greek: Αναστάσιος "Τάσος" Παπάζογλου; born 24 September 1988) is a Greek former professional footballer who played as a centre-back.

== Club career ==
=== Panserraikos ===
Papazoglou's first football steps were taken at the age of six in football academies of Giorgos Koudas in Thessaloniki, but soon after he moved to an amateur club AS Neapoli. From there he moved to Panserraikos, making his senior team debut during the 2006–07 season. He stayed to the club for over five years, managing also to wear captain's armband. During his spell with Panserraikos, he was also converted from midfielder to central defender.

=== Olympiacos ===
His performances impressed the technical staff of Olympiacos and on 30 August 2010, he signed a five-year contract with the Greek giants. However, due to Olympiacos' completeness in this position, he was immediately given on loan back to Panserraikos for the 2010–11 season. After a remarkable presence during his loan to Panserraikos (24 appearances, 2 goals), apart from the positive feedback received from the media, he secured his return to Olympiacos in the summer of 2011. Papazoglou had a three-year presence at Olympiacos, appearing in 46 matches and scoring two goals in all competitions, managing to win three championships and two cups. On 23 July 2014, his contract with the club was terminated, as he was not among Olympiacos's plans for the 2014–15 season.

=== APOEL ===
On 23 July 2014, Papazoglou signed a one-year contract, with the option of a further season with Cypriot champions APOEL. He made his debut against HJK Helsinki at GSP Stadium on 6 August 2014, in APOEL's 2–0 victory for the third qualifying round of the 2014–15 UEFA Champions League. He made his only 2014–15 UEFA Champions League group stage appearance with APOEL on 10 December 2014, playing the full 90 minutes in APOEL's 4–0 defeat against Ajax at Amsterdam Arena. On 1 February 2015, his contract with APOEL was terminated.

=== Xanthi ===
At the end of January transfer period, Xanthi proceeded to the acquisition of Papazoglou. At the end of the season, Papazoglou solved his contract with the club.

=== Panetolikos ===
On 11 August 2015, Panetolikos announced a two-year contract with the player for an undisclosed fee. On 6 September 2016, Papazoglou suffered a meniscus rupture, ruptured medial collateral ligament and anterior cruciate rupture in a friendly game against AEL, in a nasty tackle from Nico Varela. From February 25, 2017, he has returned in the team, while, on April 5, in the last Super League Greece game against Xanthi was a starter.

=== Apollon Smyrnis ===
On 17 July 2017, Apollon Smyrnis officially announced the signing of central defender for an undisclosed fee.

=== OFI ===
On 20 July 2018, OFI officially announced the signing of central defender for an undisclosed fee.

On 28 May 2019, the team announced that his contract would not be renewed.

=== Zira ===
On 17 July 2019, Papazoglou signed one-year contract with Zira FK.

=== Second spell at Xanthi ===
On 1 October 2020, Papazoglou signed a contract with Xanthi F.C.

== International career ==
Papazoglou was a part of the Greek national under-19 team squad that reached the final of the 2007 UEFA European Under-19 Championship and managed to win the 2nd place. Then he became a member of the Greek national under-21 team, contributing significantly to his team's qualification for the play-offs of the 2011 UEFA European Under-21 Championship.

== Career statistics ==
As of 19 May 2021

Club	Season	League			National Cup		Super Cup		Europe		Total	
Club	Season	Division	Apps	Goals	Apps	Goals	Apps	Goals	Apps	Goals	Apps	Goals
Panserraikos	2006–07	Beta Ethniki	1	0	0	0	–	–	–	–	1	0
Panserraikos	2007–08	Beta Ethniki	1	0	0	0	–	–	–	–	1	0
Panserraikos	2008–09	Super League Greece	8	1	4	0	–	–	–	–	12	1
Panserraikos	2009–10	Beta Ethniki	35	2	3	0	–	–	–	–	38	2
Panserraikos (loan)	2010–11	Super League Greece	24	2	1	0	–	–	–	–	25	2
Panserraikos (loan)	Total		69	5	8	0	–	–	–	–	77	5
Olympiacos	2011–12	Super League Greece	4	0	2	0	–	–	2	0	8	0
Olympiacos	2012–13	Super League Greece	15	1	7	1	–	–	0	0	22	2
Olympiacos	2013–14	Super League Greece	12	0	4	0	–	–	0	0	16	0
Olympiacos	Total		31	1	13	1	–	–	2	0	46	2
APOEL	2014–15	Cypriot First Division	9	0	1	0	0	0	3	0	13	0
APOEL	Total		9	0	1	0	0	0	3	0	13	0
Skoda Xanthi	2014–15	Super League Greece	8	1	2	0	–	–	–	–	10	1
Skoda Xanthi	Total		8	1	2	0	–	–	–	–	10	1
Panetolikos	2015–16	Super League Greece	23	1	2	0	–	–	–	–	25	1
Panetolikos	2016–17	Super League Greece	5	0	-	-	–	–	–	–	5	0
Panetolikos	Total		28	1	2	0	–	–	–	–	30	1
Apollon Smyrnis	2017–18	Super League Greece	26	1	1	0	–	–	–	–	27	1
Apollon Smyrnis	Total		26	1	1	0	–	–	–	–	27	1
OFI	2018–19	Super League Greece	18	0	1	0	–	–	–	–	19	0
OFI	Total		18	0	1	0	–	–	–	–	19	0
Zira	2019–20	Azerbaijan Premier League	10	0	1	0	–	–	–	–	11	0
Zira	Total		10	0	1	0	–	–	–	–	11	0
Xanthi	2020–21	Super League Greece 2	21	0	–	–	–	–	–	–	21	0
Xanthi	Total		21	0	–	–	–	–	–	–	21	0
Career total			220	9	29	1	0	0	5	0	254	10

== Honours ==
=== Club ===
Olympiacos

- Super League Greece: 2011–12, 2012–13, 2013–14
- Greek Cup: 2011–12, 2012–13

Panserraikos

- Super League Greece 2: 2022–23

=== International ===
Greece U19

- UEFA European Under-19 Championship : Runner-up 2007

== Personal life ==
Papazoglou hails from Akritochori, Serres.
