= Javi Cantero =

Spanish footballer

Personal information
- Full name: Javier Cantero de la Puente
- Date of birth: 22 January 1988 (age 38)
- Place of birth: Granada, Spain
- Height: 1.78 m (5 ft 10 in)
- Position: Left back

Youth career
- Espanyol

Senior career*
Years	Team	Apps	(Gls)
2007–2009	Espanyol B	30	(0)
2009–2012	Atlético Madrid B	84	(5)
2012–2013	Oviedo	26	(1)
2013–2014	Enosis Neon	17	(0)
2014–2016	Mirandés	30	(1)
2016–2017	Recreativo	30	(1)
2017–2019	Burgos	36	(1)
2019	Ebro	9	(0)
2020	Maracena	7	(1)

International career
2006–2007	Spain U19	13	(0)
- * Club domestic league appearances and goals as of 8 March 2020

Javier 'Javi' Cantero de la Puente (born 22 January 1988) is a Spanish footballer who plays as a left back.

== Club career ==
Born in Granada, Andalusia, Cantero graduated from RCD Espanyol's youth academy, and made his senior debut with the reserves in the 2007–08 season, in Segunda División B. On 22 July 2009 he signed for Atlético Madrid, but again featured solely for the B-team also in the third level.

On 6 August 2012, Cantero moved to fellow league side Real Oviedo. After featuring regularly for the Asturians during his only season, he moved abroad for the first time, joining Cyprus' Enosis Neon Paralimni FC.

Cantero returned to Spain on 23 July 2014, signing for Segunda División club CD Mirandés. He played his first match as a professional on 24 August, featuring 90 minutes in the 0–0 home draw against CD Lugo. He scored his only league goal the following 16 May, but in a 2–3 home loss to FC Barcelona B.

Released in June 2016, Cantero subsequently joined Recreativo de Huelva.
