= David Biton =

Israeli footballer

David Biton דוד ביטון
Personal information
- Full name: David Biton
- Date of birth: 23 October 1982 (age 44)
- Place of birth: Ashdod, Israel
- Position: Striker

Team information
- Current team: Beitar Ramat Gan

Youth career
- F.C. Ashdod

Senior career*
Years	Team	Apps	(Gls)
2002–2004	F.C. Ashdod		
2003–2004	→ Hapoel Nahlat Yehuda		
2004–2005	Hapoel Ra'anana		
2005–2006	Ironi Ramla		
2006–2008	Hapoel Azor		
2008–2011	Maccabi Kabilio Jaffa		
2011–2012	Hapoel Azor		
2012–2014	Shikun HaMizrah		
2014–2015	Hapoel Bik'at HaYarden		
2015–2022	Shikun Vatikim Ramat Gan		
2015–2016	→ Hapoel Ashdod		
2016–2017	→ Beitar Ramat Gan		
- * Club domestic league appearances and goals

David Biton (Hebrew: דוד ביטון; born 23 October 1982) is a former Israeli footballer who plays as a striker.
