= Rati Tsinamdzgvrishvili =

Georgian footballer (born 1988)

Rati Tsinamdzghvrishvili
Personal information
- Date of birth: 22 March 1988 (age 38)
- Place of birth: Tbilisi, Soviet Union
- Height: 1.87 m (6 ft 2 in)
- Position: Forward

Senior career*
| Years | Team | Apps | (Gls) |
| 2003–2009 | Ameri Tbilisi | 75 | (27) |
| 2004–2006 | → Ameri-2 Tbilisi | 39 | (37) |
| 2009–2013 | Zestaponi | 76 | (23) |
| 2013–2014 | Chikhura Sachkhere | 15 | (2) |
| 2014 | Sasco Tbilisi | 2 | (0) |
| 2014–2015 | Sapovnela Terjola | 9 | (1) |
| 2015 | Chiatura | 10 | (1) |

International career
| 2003–2004 | Georgia U17 | 5 | (3) |
| 2004–2006 | Georgia U19 | 13 | (11) |
| 2006–2007 | Georgia U21 | 7 | (2) |
| 2005–2006 | Georgia | 3 | (0) |
- * Club domestic league appearances and goals

Rati Tsinamdzghvrishvili (Georgian: რატი წინამძღვრიშვილი, born 22 March 1988) is a Georgian former professional footballer who played as a forward.

== Career ==
Tsinamdzghvrishvili made his international debut for the Georgia national team at the age of 17.

In 2006, he won the Georgian Cup with FC Ameri Tbilisi, in the final of which he scored a beautiful header against FC Zestaponi. He also scored in Zestaponi's match against FC Samtredia in 2011, when Zestaponi secured their maiden Georgian Cup.
