= Cristián Sánchez (footballer) =

Argentine footballer (born 1991)

Personal information
- Full name: Cristián Hernán Sánchez
- Date of birth: 2 October 1991 (age 35)
- Place of birth: Granadero Baigorria, Argentina
- Height: 1.77 m (5 ft 10 in)
- Position: Midfielder

Team information
- Current team: Defensores de Belgrano

Senior career*
Years	Team	Apps	(Gls)
- Tiro Federal
- ADIUR
2014–2018	→ Central Córdoba (loan)	142	(15)
2018–2019	→ All Boys (loan)	30	(3)
2019–2021	San Martín SJ	28	(1)
2022	Defensores de Belgrano	36	(4)
2023	San Martín SJ	15	(0)
2024–	Defensores de Belgrano	16	(0)
- * Club domestic league appearances and goals as of 18:03, 25 July 2025 (UTC)

Cristián Hernán Sánchez (born 2 October 1991) is an Argentine professional footballer who plays as a midfielder for Defensores de Belgrano.

== Career ==
Sánchez played the early years of his career with Tiro Federal and ADIUR. In 2014, Sánchez joined Central Córdoba of Primera C Metropolitana on loan. He remained for four years, netting fifteen goals across one hundred and forty-two appearances. On 30 June 2018, Sánchez was loaned to Primera B Metropolitana side All Boys. He made his debut versus San Miguel on 18 August, before scoring his first goal against Defensores Unidos on 8 September.

== Career statistics ==
As of 17 April 2019.

Appearances and goals by club, season and competition
Club	Season	League			Cup		Continental		Other		Total	
Club	Season	Division	Apps	Goals	Apps	Goals	Apps	Goals	Apps	Goals	Apps	Goals
ADIUR	2019	Torneo Regional Federal Amateur	0	0	0	0	—		0	0	0	0
All Boys (loan)	2018–19	Primera B Metropolitana	21	1	0	0	—		0	0	21	1
Career total			21	1	0	0	—		5	0	21	1
