= Glenn Roberts (footballer) =

Norwegian footballer (born 1988)

Personal information
- Full name: Glenn Noble Kårby Roberts
- Date of birth: 26 June 1988 (age 38)
- Place of birth: Oslo, Norway
- Height: 1.77 m (5 ft 9 1/2 in)
- Position: Forward

Youth career
- Vålerenga

Senior career*
Years	Team	Apps	(Gls)
2006–2008	Vålerenga	16	(1)
2008	→ Nybergsund (loan)	5	(0)
2008–2011	Aalesund	23	(3)
2010	→ Åtvidaberg (loan)	13	(1)
2011–2012	Sarpsborg 08	33	(1)

International career^{‡}
2003	Norway U-15	4	(0)
2006	Norway U-18	7	(4)
2006–2007	Norway U-19	12	(7)
- * Club domestic league appearances and goals as of 24 October 2012 ‡ National team caps and goals as of 05:55, 11 June 2009 (UTC)

Glenn Noble Roberts (born 26 June 1988) is a retired Norwegian footballer of Gambian descent. In April 2008, he spent time on loan to Nybergsund together with then-teammate Amin Nouri. Roberts was transferred to Aalesunds FK in August 2008.

== Career statistics ==
Season	Club	Division	League		Cup		Total	
Season	Club	Division	Apps	Goals	Apps	Goals	Apps	Goals
2006	Vålerenga	Tippeligaen	8	1	1	0	9	1
2007	Vålerenga	Tippeligaen	6	0	1	0	7	0
2008	Vålerenga	Tippeligaen	2	0	1	0	3	0
2008	Nybergsund	Adeccoligaen	5	0	0	0	5	0
2008	Aalesund	Tippeligaen	3	0	0	0	3	0
2009	Aalesund	Tippeligaen	12	2	2	2	14	4
2010	Aalesund	Tippeligaen	8	1	2	1	10	2
2010	Åtvidaberg	Allsvenskan	13	1	0	0	13	1
2011	Sarpsborg 08	Tippeligaen	19	1	2	0	21	1
2012	Sarpsborg 08	Adeccoligaen	14	0	1	0	15	0
Career Total			90	6	10	3	100	9

== Personal life ==
He was born in Oslo to a father from Gambia and a mother from Ålesund.
