= Rodoljub Marjanović =

Serbian footballer

Personal information
- Full name: Rodoljub Marjanović
- Date of birth: 27 January 1988 (age 38)
- Place of birth: Osijek, SFR Yugoslavia
- Height: 1.79 m (5 ft 10 in)
- Position: Forward

Youth career
- Radnički Sombor
- Mladost Apatin
- Partizan
- Rad

Senior career*
Years	Team	Apps	(Gls)
2005–2007	Rad	22	(2)
2007–2010	OFK Beograd	35	(3)
2009	→ Radnički Sombor (loan)	12	(0)
2010	→ Hajduk Kula (loan)	8	(2)
2010–2011	Hajduk Kula	8	(0)
2011	Radnički Sombor	14	(0)
2012	CSMS Iași	7	(4)
2012	Radnički Sombor		
2013	Čelik Nikšić	8	(1)
2013	Inđija	4	(1)
2014	Radnički Sombor		
2015	FC Gute	10	(3)
2016	Dalhem IF	14	(2)

International career
2004–2005	Serbia and Montenegro U17 (Note: Only official UEFA matches included)	5	(4)
2007	Serbia U19	6	(2)
- * Club domestic league appearances and goals as of 9 January 2019

Rodoljub "Rođa" Marjanović (Serbian Cyrillic: Родољуб "Рођа" Марјановић; born 27 January 1988) is a Serbian professional footballer who plays as a forward. He also holds Croatian citizenship.

Despite his talent, Marjanović never managed to reach his full potential due to the lack of professionalism. He is, however, probably best known for being recognized by FIFPro's Black Book Eastern Europe after allegedly being threatened with death for asking the Football Association of Serbia (FSS) to take action for unpaid salaries during a loan spell at Hajduk Kula.

== Early life ==
Born in Osijek (in present-day Croatia), Marjanović spent the majority of his childhood in nearby Beli Manastir. He moved to Sombor (in present-day Vojvodina, an autonomous province of Serbia) with his family in 1997, subsequently joining the youth ranks of local club Radnički. He also played for Mladost Apatin and Partizan at youth level.

== Club career ==
While completing his formation at Rad, Marjanović made his senior debut in the second half of the 2004–05 Serbian Second League. He spent two more seasons with the Građevinari, before transferring to OFK Beograd in August 2007, signing a four-year contract. Subsequently, Marjanović played for the Romantičari over the next two seasons, before being loaned to Radnički Sombor (2009) and Hajduk Kula (2010).

Despite skipping training sessions during the later part of his loan spell, Marjanović was signed by Hajduk Kula on a permanent basis in the summer of 2010. He eventually gained wide media attention in early 2011, following disputes with the club's board. Later that year, Marjanović rejoined his former club Radnički Sombor.

In March 2012, Marjanović moved abroad and joined Romanian club CSMS Iași. He played seven games and scored four goals in Liga II, helping the club earn promotion to the top flight. After a brief third spell at Radnički Sombor in late 2012, Marjanović signed with Montenegrin First League club Čelik Nikšić in January 2013.

In August 2013, Marjanović returned to Serbia and signed for Serbian First League side Inđija. He subsequently made another return to Radnički Sombor in the 2014 winter transfer window. In July 2015, Marjanović moved to Sweden and joined FC Gute on a short-term contract. He later signed with fellow Swedish side Dalhem IF in March 2016.

== International career ==
A former Serbia and Montenegro U17 international, Marjanović represented Serbia at the 2007 UEFA European Under-19 Championship.

== Statistics ==
Club	Season	League	
Club	Season	Apps	Goals
Rad	2004–05	1	0
Rad	2005–06	8	0
Rad	2006–07	13	2
OFK Beograd	2007–08	17	2
OFK Beograd	2008–09	18	1
Radnički Sombor (loan)	2009–10	12	0
Hajduk Kula (loan)	2009–10	8	2
Hajduk Kula	2010–11	8	0
Radnički Sombor	2011–12	14	0
CSMS Iași	2011–12	7	4
Radnički Sombor	2012–13		
Čelik Nikšić	2012–13	8	1
Inđija	2013–14	4	1
Radnički Sombor	2013–14		
Radnički Sombor	2014–15		
FC Gute	2015	10	3
Dalhem IF	2016	14	2
Career total		142	18
