= Andreas Lampropoulos =

Greek footballer

Personal information
- Date of birth: 30 July 1988 (age 38)
- Place of birth: Patras, Greece
- Height: 1.82 m (6 ft 0 in)
- Positions: Attacking midfielder; winger

Youth career
- 2004–2005: Thyella Patras

Senior career*
Years	Team	Apps	(Gls)
2005–2007	Thyella Patras	59	(8)
2007–2009	AEL	7	(0)
2009	→ Panachaiki (loan)	13	(2)
2009–2012	Kerkyra	44	(3)
2012–2015	OFI	59	(6)
2015	Aris Limassol	0	(0)
2015–2017	AEL	32	(4)
2017–2018	Apollon Larisa	3	(0)
Total		217	(23)

International career
2006–2007	Greece U19	8	(3)
2009	Greece U21	5	(1)
- * Club domestic league appearances and goals as of 25 November 2017

Andreas Lampropoulos (Greek: Ανδρέας Λαμπρόπουλος; born 30 July 1988) is a Greek former professional footballer who played as a midfielder.

== Club career ==
Lampropoulos started his career with his local Patras-based club Thyella, in the summer of 2004. He signed a professional contract and moved to the first squad in January 2005 at the age of 16. He remained at the club for 2 seasons playing in the 3rd Division, making a total of 59 appearances and scored 8 goals. On 7 July 2007, he signed with Greek Super League side AEL, where he made 7 appearances until January 2009, when he was given on loan to his hometown team Panachaiki. From July 2009 until August 2012 he played for AO Kerkyra making a total of 44 appearances and scored 3 goals. On 30 August 2012, he moved to Super League club OFI. He competed successfully with the Cretan team in the 1st Division for almost 3 years and played in 59 league games. After the dissolution of the team due to major financial problems, he had an agreement with Cypriot First Division club Aris Limassol. Despite that, he never made an official debut with the team and 2 months later he was transferred back to Greece. On 21 August 2015, he signed once more with AEL.

== International career ==
He was member of the Greece U19 team that reached the final during the 2007 UEFA European Under-19 Championship. He scored the winning goal on the 90th minute of the semifinal against Germany. With this goal, a ten-man Greek side won 3-2 and advanced to the final against Spain. His first participation with the national colors was on 5 September 2006 in the town of Senec, in a friendly game against Slovakia, where he was replaced at half-time, and his first goal was two days later in the same court and the same opponent, on the 48th minute of the match.
