= Steve Pinau =

French footballer (born 1988)

Personal information
- Full name: Steven Pinau
- Date of birth: 11 March 1988 (age 38)
- Place of birth: Le Mans, France
- Height: 1.81 m (5 ft 11 in)
- Position: Forward

Youth career
- 2000–2007: Monaco

Senior career*
Years	Team	Apps	(Gls)
2007–2008	Monaco	2	(0)
2008–2012	Genoa	0	(0)
2008–2009	→ Hibernian (loan)	8	(0)
2009–2010	→ Lugano (loan)	4	(0)
2010	→ Arles (loan)	0	(0)
2010–2012	→ Bayonne (loan)	29	(10)
2012–2013	Clermont	10	(1)
2013	Vendée Poiré-sur-Vie	2	(0)
2013–2014	Fátima		
2014	Rochester Rhinos		
2014–2015	Le Poiré-sur-Vie	13	(0)
2015–2016	Bromley	3	(0)
2016–2017	Cannet Rocheville	6	(1)
2020	Nunawading City		
2020–202?	Mouans Sartoux		

International career
2004–2005	France U-16	9	(1)
2006–2007	France U-19	7	(2)
- * Club domestic league appearances and goals as of 17:06, 16 March 2016

Steve Pinau (born 11 March 1988) is a retired French footballer.

== Career ==
Pinau, a French youth international, started his career with Monaco, making two appearances in Ligue 1. He signed for Genoa on a four-year contract, but was almost immediately loaned to Hibernian. Genoa also paid Monaco €560,000 as training compensation.

Pinau made his debut for Hibs as a late substitute in a 1–1 draw at Inverness on 23 August 2008. He was restricted to substitute and reserve team appearances for Hibs, as he struggled to displace established forwards Steven Fletcher, Derek Riordan and Colin Nish. His only goal for Hibs was scored in a 4–3 defeat against Greenock Morton in the Scottish League Cup.

FC Lugano, the sister club of Geona, signed the French forward on loan for the 2009–10 season. After half-year with Lugano, he was loaned to AC Arles-Avignon.

Pinau then signed for Bromley on a short-term contract with the option to extend. This move was confirmed on 19 December 2015 after international clearance was obtained. He left the club in February 2016. In June 2016, he signed with French team Cannet Rocheville.

In the first half of 2020, he played for Australian side Nunawading City FC. After a spell in Australia, Pinau returned to France where he joined Mouans Sartoux in June 2020.
