= Dennis Schmidt (footballer) =

German footballer (born 1988)

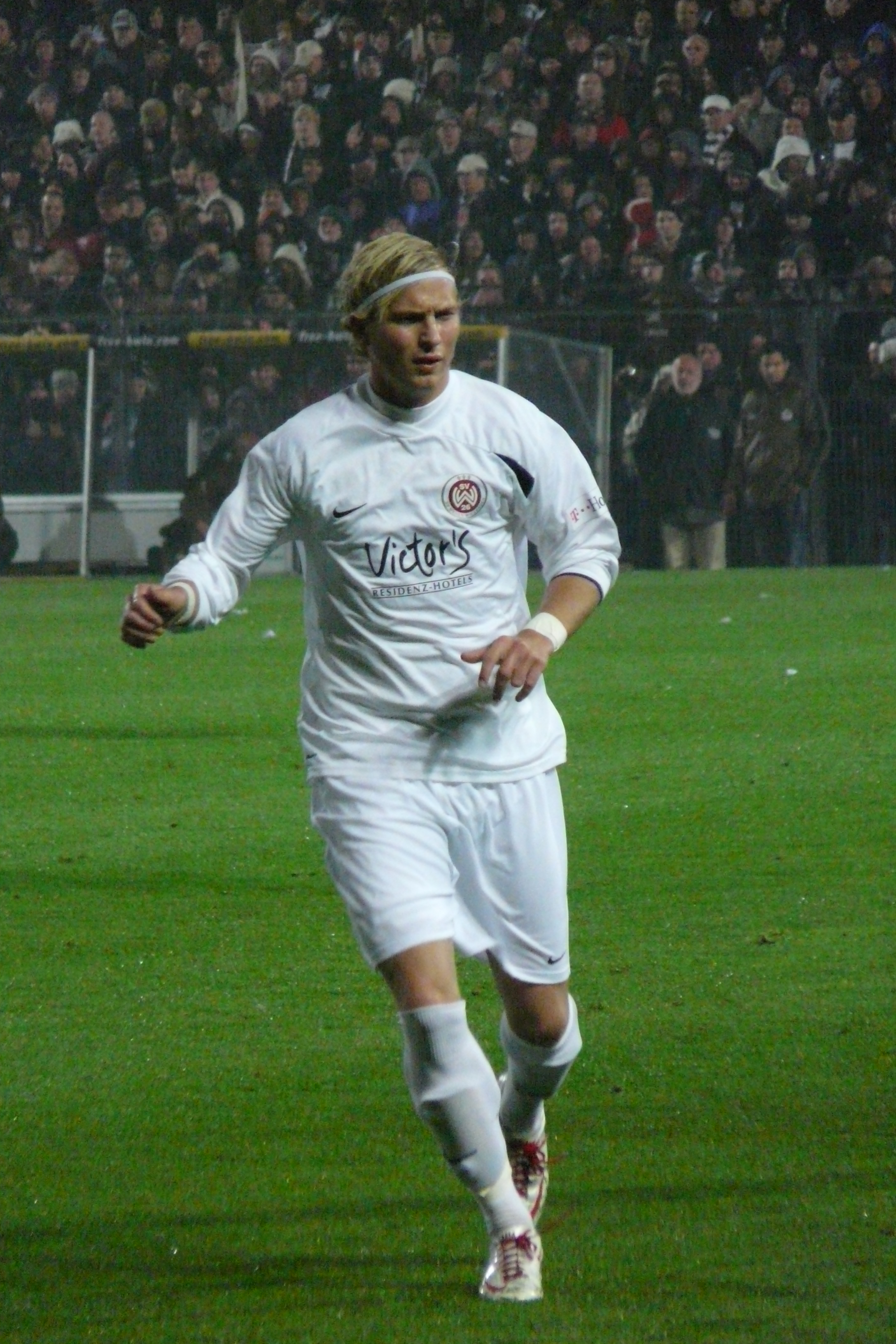

Personal information
- Full name: Dennis Schmidt
- Date of birth: April 18, 1988 (age 38)
- Place of birth: Wermelskirchen, West Germany
- Height: 1.88 m (6 ft 2 in)
- Position: Striker

Team information
- Current team: SSV Dhünn

Senior career*
Years	Team	Apps	(Gls)
2006–2008	Bayer Leverkusen II	50	(17)
2008–2009	SV Wehen Wiesbaden	36	(1)
2009–2011	VfL Osnabrück	52	(8)
2011–2012	Viktoria Köln	26	(13)
2012–2013	Sportfreunde Lotte	30	(5)
2013–2014	SV Darmstadt 98	7	(0)
2014–2015	Wuppertaler SV	37	(17)
2015–2017	TSV Meerbusch	60	(17)
2017–	SSV Dhünn	54	(55)

International career
2009	Germany U-21	2	(0)
- * Club domestic league appearances and goals as of 25 January 2021

Dennis Schmidt (born April 18, 1988, in Wermelskirchen) is a German footballer who plays for SSV Dhünn.
