= 2012 UEFA European Under-19 Championship qualification =

2012 UEFA European Under-19 Championship (qualifying round) was the first round of qualifications for the Final Tournament of 2012 UEFA European Under-19 Championship.

The 48 teams were divided into 12 groups of four teams, with each group being contested as a mini-tournament, hosted by one of the group's teams. After all matches have been played, the 12 group winners and 12 group runners-up and the best third-placed team advanced to the Elite round. Estonia qualified as hosts while England, France and Spain received byes to the elite round. Liechtenstein did not enter.

== Seeds ==
The draw took place at 30 November 2010, 10.00 CET.

Pot A	Pot B
Portugal; Turkey; Germany; Serbia; Italy; Netherlands; Hungary; Croatia; Ukraine; Russia; Greece; Norway; Switzerland; Slovakia; Belgium; Austria; Czech Republic; Republic of Ireland; Denmark; Poland; Scotland; Belarus; Azerbaijan; Iceland	Finland; Slovenia; Bulgaria; Romania; Latvia; Lithuania; Sweden; Israel; Bosnia and Herzegovina; Moldova; Northern Ireland; Cyprus; Montenegro; Albania; Wales; Kazakhstan; Armenia; Macedonia; Georgia; Malta; Faroe Islands; Luxembourg; Andorra; San Marino

The hosts of the twelve one-venue mini-tournament groups are indicated below in italics.

== Tiebreakers ==
If two or more teams are equal on points on completion of the group matches, the following criteria are applied to determine the rankings.

1. Higher number of points obtained in the group matches played among the teams in question
2. Superior goal difference from the group matches played among the teams in question
3. Higher number of goals scored in the group matches played among the teams in question
4. If, after applying criteria 1) to 3) to several teams, two teams still have an equal ranking, the criteria 1) to 3) will be reapplied to determine the ranking of these teams. If this procedure does not lead to a decision, criteria 5) and 6) will apply
5. Results of all group matches:
  1. Superior goal difference
  2. Higher number of goals scored
6. Drawing of lots

Additionally, if two teams which have the same number of points and the same number of goals scored and conceded play their last group match against each other and are still equal at the end of that match, their final rankings are determined by the penalty shoot-out and not by the criteria listed above. This procedure is applicable only if a ranking of the teams is required to determine the group winner or the runners-up and the third-placed team.

== Group 1 ==
Team	Pld	W	D	L	GF	GA	GD	Pts
Portugal (H)	3	2	1	0	18	4	+14	7
Hungary	3	2	1	0	11	4	+7	7
Faroe Islands	3	1	0	2	6	12	−6	3
San Marino	3	0	0	3	0	15	−15	0

(H) Hosts
4 November 2011
16:00

Hungary	5–0	San Marino
Radó 26'; Tóth 44'; Adorján 45+2'; Szécsi 48'; Vass 79'	Report

Estádio Cidade de Barcelos, Barcelos
Referee: Vladimir Vnuk (Slovakia)

4 November 2011
16:00

Portugal	9–1	Faroe Islands
Teixeira 19'; Betinho 29', 41', 54'; Alves 64'; Ferreira 79'; Esgaio 84'; Tozé 90'; Cafú 90+1'	Report	Petersen 86'

Estádio do Varzim Sport Club, Póvoa de Varzim
Referee: Harald Lechner (Austria)

6 November 2011
16:00

Hungary	3–1	Faroe Islands
Novothny 30'; Szécsi 32', 48'	Report	Jonsson 47'

Estádio do Varzim Sport Club, Póvoa de Varzim
Referee: Vladimir Vnuk (Slovakia)

6 November 2011
16:00

San Marino	0–6	Portugal
	Report	Tozé 4'; Teixeira 42'; Cafú 45+1', 49', 89'; Betinho 58'

Estádio Cidade de Barcelos, Barcelos
Referee: Emir Alecković (Bosnia and Herzegovina)

9 November 2011
16:00

Portugal	3–3	Hungary
Tozé 25'; Alves 60'; Betinho 66' (pen.)	Report	Adorján 51' (pen.); Radó 69'; Vécsei 74'

Sports Center CF Fão, Fão
Referee: Harald Lechner (Austria)

9 November 2011
16:00

Faroe Islands	4–0	San Marino
Jonsson 51'; Petersen 55', 86'; Jensen 90+3'	Report

Municipal Stadium, Vila Verde
Referee: Emir Alecković (Bosnia and Herzegovina)

== Group 2 ==
Team	Pld	W	D	L	GF	GA	GD	Pts
Bosnia and Herzegovina	3	3	0	0	6	1	+5	9
Republic of Ireland	3	2	0	1	7	4	+3	6
Bulgaria (H)	3	1	0	2	3	6	−3	3
Russia	3	0	0	3	1	6	−5	0

(H) Hosts
6 October 2011
14:00

Russia	0–2	Bosnia and Herzegovina
	Report	Šivšić 26'; Kukavica 38'

Lokomotiv Stadium, Plovdiv
Referee: Antti Munukka (Finland)

6 October 2011
15:00

Republic of Ireland	4–1	Bulgaria
C. Smith 3'; Byrne 12'; Carruthers 66'; Forde 87'	Report	Nedelev 71'

Hristo Botev Stadium, Plovdiv
Referee: Paolo Valeri (Italy)

8 October 2011
14:00

Bosnia and Herzegovina	2–0	Republic of Ireland
Maletić 27'; Prcić 84'	Report

Hristo Botev Stadium, Plovdiv
Referee: Nerijus Dunauskas (Lithuania)

8 October 2011
15:00

Russia	0–1	Bulgaria
	Report	Kozhuharov 61'

Lokomotiv Stadium, Plovdiv
Referee: Paolo Valeri (Italy)

11 October 2011
15:00

Republic of Ireland	3–1	Russia
George 63'; G. Smith 66'; Forde 80'	Report	Dzhalilov 23'

Lokomotiv Stadium, Plovdiv
Referee: Antti Munukka (Finland)

11 October 2011
15:00

Bulgaria	1–2	Bosnia and Herzegovina
Nedelev 19'	Report	Šivšić 5'; Rahmanović 78'

Hristo Botev Stadium, Plovdiv
Referee: Nerijus Dunauskas (Lithuania)

== Group 3 ==
Team	Pld	W	D	L	GF	GA	GD	Pts
Romania	3	2	1	0	5	1	+4	7
Italy	3	1	1	1	4	4	0	4
Azerbaijan	3	1	0	2	2	5	−3	3
Sweden (H)	3	0	2	1	1	2	−1	2

(H) Hosts
6 October 2011
15:00

Italy	1–2	Romania
Ganz 21'	Report	Stănescu 45'; Gavra 90+3'

Påskbergsvallen, Varberg
Referee: Artur Soares Dias (Portugal)

6 October 2011
19:00

Azerbaijan	1–0	Sweden
Agayev 82'	Report

Falkenbergs IP, Falkenberg
Referee: Pavle Radovanović (Montenegro)

8 October 2011
15:00

Italy	1–1	Sweden
De Silvestro 44'	Report	Nazari 88' (pen.)

Påskbergsvallen, Varberg
Referee: Pavle Radovanović (Montenegro)

8 October 2011
15:00

Romania	3–0	Azerbaijan
Gavra 66', 85', 90'	Report

Falkenbergs IP, Falkenberg
Referee: Mark Steven Whitby (Wales)

11 October 2011
15:00

Azerbaijan	1–2	Italy
Hajiyev 65' (pen.)	Report	Verre 13' (pen.); Ciciretti 90+3'

Glänninge Park, Laholm
Referee: Artur Soares Dias (Portugal)

11 October 2011
15:00

Sweden	0–0	Romania
	Report

Falkenbergs IP, Falkenberg
Referee: Mark Steven Whitby (Wales)

== Group 4 ==
Team	Pld	W	D	L	GF	GA	GD	Pts
Norway	3	1	2	0	7	5	+2	5
Cyprus (H)	3	1	2	0	6	4	+2	5
Latvia	3	1	0	2	2	4	−2	3
Iceland	3	0	2	1	3	5	−2	2

(H) Hosts
21 October 2011
14:00

Iceland	0–2	Latvia
	Report	Giļničs 14' (pen.); Stuglis 61'

Ammochostos Stadium, Larnaca
Attendance: 30
Referee: Dimitar Meckarovski (Macedonia)

21 October 2011
14:00

Norway	3–3	Cyprus
Hussain 14' (pen.); Wikheim 16'; Johansen 90'	Report	Breimyr 2' (o.g.); Sotiriou 8', 26'

Makario Stadium, Nicosia
Attendance: 200
Referee: Kristo Tohver (Estonia)

23 October 2011
14:00

Iceland	1–1	Cyprus
Adalgeirsson 34'	Report	Sotiriou 23' (pen.)

Makario Stadium, Nicosia
Attendance: 150
Referee: Dimitar Meckarovski (Macedonia)

23 October 2011
14:00

Latvia	0–2	Norway
	Report	Dure 32'; Nielsen 38'

GSZ Stadium, Larnaca
Attendance: 20
Referee: Mihály Fábián (Hungary)

26 October 2011
14:00

Norway	2–2	Iceland
Hussain 6'; Johansen 62'	Report	Fridjonsson 20'; Gardarsson 51'

GSZ Stadium, Larnaca
Attendance: 100
Referee: Mihály Fábián (Hungary)

26 October 2011
14:00

Cyprus	2–0	Latvia
Englezou 58'; Theodorou 90+3'	Report

Makario Stadium, Nicosia
Attendance: 180
Referee: Kristo Tohver (Estonia)

== Group 5 ==
Team	Pld	W	D	L	GF	GA	GD	Pts
Czech Republic	3	2	0	1	3	2	+1	6
Serbia	3	1	1	1	1	1	0	4
Israel (H)	3	1	1	1	4	4	0	4
Lithuania	3	0	2	1	2	3	−1	2

(H) Hosts
8 November 2011
13:00

Serbia	0–0	Lithuania
	Report

Bat Yam Municipal Stadium, Bat Yam
Referee: Martin Strömbergsson (Sweden)

8 November 2011
13:00

Czech Republic	1–2	Israel
Kunc 18'	Report	Azubel 41'; Nachmani 45+3' (pen.)

Haberfeld Stadium, Rishon LeZion
Referee: Danny Makkelie (Netherlands)

10 November 2011
16:00

Serbia	1–0	Israel
Mitrović 48'	Report

Haberfeld Stadium, Rishon LeZion
Referee: Anar Salmanov (Azerbaijan)

10 November 2011
16:00

Lithuania	0–1	Czech Republic
	Report	Plšek 3'

Bat Yam Municipal Stadium, Bat Yam
Referee: Danny Makkelie (Netherlands)

13 November 2011
15:00

Czech Republic	1–0	Serbia
Houska 52'	Report

Haberfeld Stadium, Rishon LeZion
Referee: Anar Salmanov (Azerbaijan)

13 November 2011
15:00

Israel	2–2	Lithuania
Halabi 60'; Hirsh 87'	Report	Kapustas 45+1'; Jefišovas 90'

Bat Yam Municipal Stadium, Bat Yam
Referee: Martin Strömbergsson (Sweden)

== Group 6 ==
Team	Pld	W	D	L	GF	GA	GD	Pts
Ukraine	3	2	1	0	6	1	+5	7
Switzerland	3	2	1	0	6	1	+5	7
Macedonia (H)	3	1	0	2	2	7	−5	3
Kazakhstan	3	0	0	3	1	6	−5	0

(H) Hosts
10 November 2011
13:00

Ukraine	2–0	Kazakhstan
Churko 10' (pen.), 48'	Report

Stadion Mladost, Strumica
Referee: Marius Avram (Romania)

10 November 2011
13:00

Switzerland	3–0	Macedonia
Widmer 41'; Geissmann 57'; Karlen 90+4'	Report

Stadion Kukuš, Strumica
Referee: Ken Henry Johnsen (Norway)

12 November 2011
13:00

Ukraine	3–0	Macedonia
Churko 11' (pen.); Zdraveski 61' (o.g.); Orlovskyi 89'	Report

Stadion Mladost, Strumica
Referee: Marius Avram (Romania)

12 November 2011
13:00

Kazakhstan	0–2	Switzerland
	Report	Jevtic 5'; Frei 32' (pen.)

Stadion Kukuš, Strumica
Referee: Sandor Szabo (Hungary)

15 November 2011
13:00

Switzerland	1–1	Ukraine
Widmer 24'	Report	Pysko 82'
Penalties
Frei (penalty scored); Widmer (penalty scored); Ajeti (penalty scored); Kryeziu (penalty missed)	3–5	Malinovskiy (penalty scored); Tashchy (penalty scored); Churko (penalty scored); Kulach (penalty scored); Bokhashvili (penalty scored)

Stadion Kukuš, Strumica
Referee: Ken Henry Johnsen (Norway)

15 November 2011
13:00

Macedonia	2–1	Kazakhstan
Alimi 59'; Babunski 71'	Report	Yskakov 53'

Stadion Mladost, Strumica
Referee: Sandor Szabo (Hungary)

== Group 7 ==
Team	Pld	W	D	L	GF	GA	GD	Pts
Germany	3	2	1	0	10	4	+6	7
Montenegro	3	1	1	1	2	3	−1	4
Northern Ireland (H)	3	1	0	2	5	8	−3	3
Belarus	3	0	2	1	4	6	−2	2

(H) Hosts
6 October 2011
14:00

Belarus	0–0	Montenegro
	Report

Stangmore Park, Dungannon
Referee: Ruddy Buquet (France)

6 October 2011
19:00

Germany	5–1	Northern Ireland
Schulz 53', 75'; Hofmann 73', 86'; Mendler 77'	Report	McLellan 76'

The Showgrounds, Coleraine
Referee: Mattias Gestranius (Finland)

8 October 2011
15:00

Montenegro	0–2	Germany
	Report	Draxler 2'; Younes 89'

Mourneview Park, Lurgan
Referee: Marios Panayi (Cyprus)

8 October 2011
20:00

Belarus	1–3	Northern Ireland
Savitskiy 72'	Report	McCartan 13'; McLaughlin 37'; McLellan 84'

The Oval, Belfast
Referee: Mattias Gestranius (Finland)

11 October 2011
13:00

Germany	3–3	Belarus
Heintz 49'; Hofmann 55', 83'	Report	Kavalyow 8'; Yadeshka 33'; Klopotskiy 38'

Shamrock Park, Portadown
Referee: Ruddy Buquet (France)

11 October 2011
13:00

Northern Ireland	1–2	Montenegro
Carson 65'	Report	Gardašević 30'; Bakić 70'

The Oval, Belfast
Referee: Marios Panayi (Cyprus)

== Group 8 ==
Team	Pld	W	D	L	GF	GA	GD	Pts
Belgium	3	2	1	0	6	1	+5	7
Slovenia (H)	3	2	1	0	5	3	+2	7
Scotland	3	1	0	2	5	6	−1	3
Wales	3	0	0	3	3	9	−6	0

(H) Hosts
21 September 2011
13:00

Belgium	3–0	Wales
Hazard 7', 34'; Feltesse 87'	Report

Ptuj City Stadium, Ptuj
Referee: Halis Özkahya (Turkey)

21 September 2011
16:00

Scotland	1–2	Slovenia
Irvine 23'	Report	Janža 52' (pen.); Pučko 67'

Bistrica stadium, Bistrica
Referee: Deniz Aytekin (Germany)

23 September 2011
13:00

Wales	1–3	Scotland
Cassidy 15'	Report	McIntosh 37'; Smith 59'; Watt 79'

Bistrica stadium, Bistrica
Referee: Halis Özkahya (Turkey)

23 September 2011
16:00

Belgium	0–0	Slovenia
	Report

Ptuj City Stadium, Ptuj
Referee: Serhiy Boiko (Ukraine)

26 September 2011
16:00

Scotland	1–3	Belgium
Holt 34'	Report	Carrasco 28'; Hazard 70'; Van der Bruggen 78'

Ptuj City Stadium, Ptuj
Referee: Deniz Aytekin (Germany)

26 September 2011
16:00

Slovenia	3–2	Wales
Baskera 8', 35'; Praprotnik 87'	Report	Parry 5'; Bender 84'

Bistrica stadium, Bistrica
Referee: Serhiy Boiko (Ukraine)

== Group 9 ==
Team	Pld	W	D	L	GF	GA	GD	Pts
Georgia	3	2	1	0	6	2	+4	7
Turkey (H)	3	1	2	0	6	3	+3	5
Poland	3	1	1	1	5	6	−1	4
Luxembourg	3	0	0	3	1	7	−6	0

(H) Hosts
11 November 2011
12:00

Poland	1–3	Georgia
Przybyłko 21'	Report	Pawłowski 31' (o.g.); Chanturia 41'; Parunashvili 76'

Anadolu University, Eskişehir
Referee: Oliver Drachta (Austria)

11 November 2011
14:00

Turkey	3–0	Luxembourg
Çalhanoğlu 17'; Yokuşlu 60'; Yılmaz 73'	Report

Eskişehir Atatürk Stadium, Eskişehir
Referee: Steven McLean (Scotland)

13 November 2011
12:00

Poland	2–1	Luxembourg
Milik 17'; Drewniak 53'	Report	Luisi 82'

Anadolu University, Eskişehir
Referee: Antonio Mateu Lahoz (Spain)

13 November 2011
14:00

Georgia	1–1	Turkey
Skhirtladze 60'	Report	Derici 74'

Eskişehir Atatürk Stadium, Eskişehir
Referee: Steven McLean (Scotland)

16 November 2011
14:00

Turkey	2–2	Poland
Yokuşlu 5' (pen.); Torun 56'	Report	Zieliński 15' (pen.); Duda 66'

Eskişehir Atatürk Stadium, Eskişehir
Referee: Antonio Mateu Lahoz (Spain)

16 November 2011
14:00

Luxembourg	0–2	Georgia
	Report	Frising 71' (o.g.); Kazaishvili 74'

Anadolu University, Eskişehir
Referee: Oliver Drachta (Austria)

== Group 10 ==
Team	Pld	W	D	L	GF	GA	GD	Pts
Greece	3	2	1	0	13	2	+11	7
Armenia (H)	3	2	0	1	4	3	+1	6
Slovakia	3	1	1	1	3	3	0	4
Andorra	3	0	0	3	0	12	−12	0

(H) Hosts
21 October 2011
10:30

Greece	10–0	Andorra
Kousidis 22', 32'; Diamantakos 24', 47'; Katidis 36'; Kourmpelis 41'; Kolovos 45+1'; Bakasetas 67', 82'; Bougaidis 70'	Report

Mika Stadium, Yerevan
Referee: Vadims Direktorenko (Latvia)

21 October 2011
13:00

Slovakia	1–2	Armenia
Vojtuš 71'	Report	H. Hovhannisyan 38', 43'

Hanrapetakan Stadium, Yerevan
Referee: Ante Vučemilović-Šimunović Jr. (Croatia)

23 October 2011
10:30

Slovakia	1–0	Andorra
Oršula 4'	Report

Mika Stadium, Yerevan
Referee: Vadims Direktorenko (Latvia)

23 October 2011
13:00

Armenia	1–2	Greece
H. Hovhannisyan 76'	Report	Katidis 4'; Bakasetas 78'

Hanrapetakan Stadium, Yerevan
Referee: Sébastien Delferiere (Belgium)

26 October 2011
12:00

Greece	1–1	Slovakia
Katidis 49'	Report	Špilár 76'

Mika Stadium, Yerevan
Referee: Ante Vučemilović-Šimunović Jr. (Croatia)

26 October 2011
12:00

Andorra	0–1	Armenia
	Report	Papikyan 82' (pen.)

Hanrapetakan Stadium, Yerevan
Referee: Sébastien Delferiere (Belgium)

== Group 11 ==
Team	Pld	W	D	L	GF	GA	GD	Pts
Croatia	3	2	1	0	8	2	+6	7
Netherlands (H)	3	2	1	0	5	0	+5	7
Finland	3	1	0	2	6	8	−2	3
Moldova	3	0	0	3	2	11	−9	0

(H) Hosts
10 November 2011
17:00

Croatia	4–2	Finland
Livaja 3', 36'; Rebić 11'; Miškić 90+3'	Report	Hatakka 5'; Väyrynen 44'

De Bataven, Gendt
Referee: Liran Liany (Israel)

10 November 2011
19:00

Netherlands	3–0	Moldova
Manu 32'; Klaassen 62', 90+2'	Report

VIOD, Doetinchem
Referee: Alexander Kostadinov (Bulgaria)

12 November 2011
15:00

Moldova	0–4	Croatia
	Report	Jelavić 24', 27', 50'; Čolak 79'

VIOD, Doetinchem
Referee: Alexander Kostadinov (Bulgaria)

12 November 2011
17:00

Netherlands	2–0	Finland
Lewis 57'; Bouy 77'	Report

De Bataven, Gendt
Referee: Sergei Karasev (Russia)

15 November 2011
19:00

Croatia	0–0	Netherlands
	Report

De Bataven, Gendt
Referee: Liran Liany (Israel)

15 November 2011
19:00

Finland	4–2	Moldova
Paananen 38'; Lam 42'; Väyrynen 62'; Kastrati 70'	Report	Mîrza 8'; Iurcu 56' (pen.)

VIOD, Doetinchem
Referee: Sergei Karasev (Russia)

== Group 12 ==
Team	Pld	W	D	L	GF	GA	GD	Pts
Denmark	3	2	1	0	5	0	+5	7
Austria (H)	3	1	2	0	3	0	+3	5
Albania	3	1	1	1	4	1	+3	4
Malta	3	0	0	3	0	11	−11	0

(H) Hosts
5 October 2011
13:00

Denmark	1–0	Albania
Kohlert 90+3'	Report

Keine Sorgen Arena, Seitenstetten
Referee: Alan Black (Northern Ireland)

5 October 2011
19:00

Austria	3–0	Malta
Krenn 22'; Spiridonović 70'; Ritzmaier 73'	Report

Ertl Glas Stadion, Amstetten
Referee: Arman Amirkhanyan (Armenia)

7 October 2011
13:00

Malta	0–4	Denmark
	Report	Fischer 14'; Cornelius 31', 40'; Brock-Madsen 75'

Ertl Glas Stadion, Amstetten
Referee: Arman Amirkhanyan (Armenia)

7 October 2011
19:00

Austria	0–0	Albania
	Report

Keine Sorgen Arena, Seitenstetten
Referee: Dawid Piasecki (Poland)

10 October 2011
19:00

Denmark	0–0	Austria
	Report

Ertl Glas Stadion, Amstetten
Referee: Alan Black (Northern Ireland)

10 October 2011
19:00

Albania	4–0	Malta
Arab 38' (o.g.); Bajraktari 45+2'; F. Hoxha 55', 78'	Report

Keine Sorgen Arena, Seitenstetten
Referee: Dawid Piasecki (Poland)

== Ranking of third-placed teams ==
To determine the best third-ranked team from the qualifying round, only the results of the third-placed team against the winners and runners-up in each group are taken into account.

=== Tiebreakers ===
The following criteria are applied to determine the rankings.

1. Higher number of points obtained in these matches
2. Superior goal difference from these matches
3. Higher number of goals scored in these matches
4. Fair play conduct of the teams in all group matches in the qualifying round
5. Drawing of lots

Grp	Team	Pld	W	D	L	GF	GA	GD	Pts
5	Israel	2	1	0	1	2	2	0	3
10	Slovakia	2	0	1	1	2	3	−1	1
12	Albania	2	0	1	1	0	1	−1	1
9	Poland	2	0	1	1	3	5	−2	1
8	Scotland	2	0	0	2	2	5	−3	0
11	Finland	2	0	0	2	2	6	−4	0
2	Bulgaria	2	0	0	2	2	6	−4	0
3	Azerbaijan	2	0	0	2	1	5	−4	0
4	Latvia	2	0	0	2	0	4	−4	0
7	Northern Ireland	2	0	0	2	2	7	−5	0
6	Macedonia	2	0	0	2	0	6	−6	0
1	Faroe Islands	2	0	0	2	2	12	−10	0

== Elite round qualifiers ==
- Armenia
- Austria
- Belgium
- Bosnia and Herzegovina
- Croatia
- Cyprus
- Czech Republic
- Denmark
- England
- France
- Georgia
- Germany
- Greece
- Hungary
- Israel
- Italy
- Montenegro
- Netherlands
- Norway
- Portugal
- Republic of Ireland
- Romania
- Serbia
- Slovenia
- Spain
- Switzerland
- Turkey
- Ukraine
