= Poelwijk Castle =

Monumental building

Coordinates: 51°52′18.77″N 5°57′55.42″E

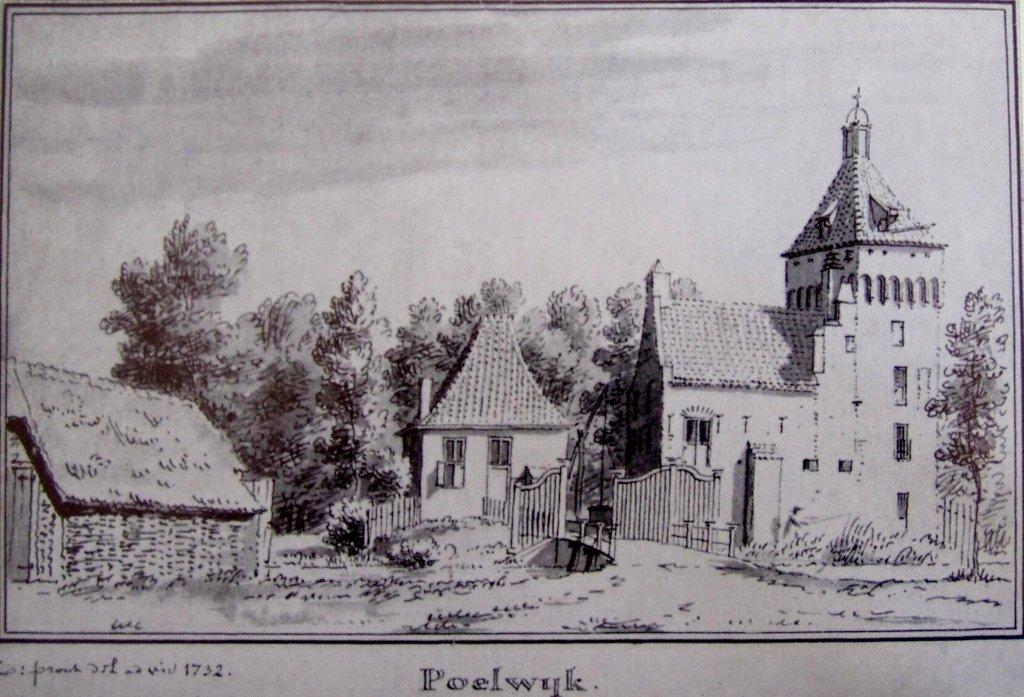
Poelwijk Castle in 1732

Poelwijk Castle is an estate and former castle located to the south of the town of Gendt, part of the municipality of Lingewaard in the Dutch province of Gelderland. The moat and a residential tower of the castle have been preserved. The residential tower is a national monument.

== History ==
The oldest mention dates from the year 1441, when the house was classified as Gelders fief owned by the Collart family. The remaining residential tower was probably built in the 15th century, possibly when the main castle had already disappeared. A major renovation must have taken place in the second half of the 16th century. On a map from 1620 a house is visible, provided with two corner towers. Special are the Trompe-l'oeil paintings that were commissioned by Johan Maurits when he inherited the house in 1702. When a farm was built on site in 1864, part of the castle had to make way for it. Only the residential tower remained. After storm and war damage, the tower was transferred to the Friends of the Geldersche Kasteelen Foundation and restored in 1959. During excavations in 1959–1960, remains of the original house were found, including the foundations of two towers. From 1959 the tower is owned by Het Geldersch Landschap. The house has been owned by the Meijaard family since 1981. The canal construction is largely still present. The estate is not open to the public, except during the Open Garden Days and the Open Monument Days.

== See also ==
- List of castles in the Netherlands
