= Kevin Duré =

Norwegian footballer (born 1993)

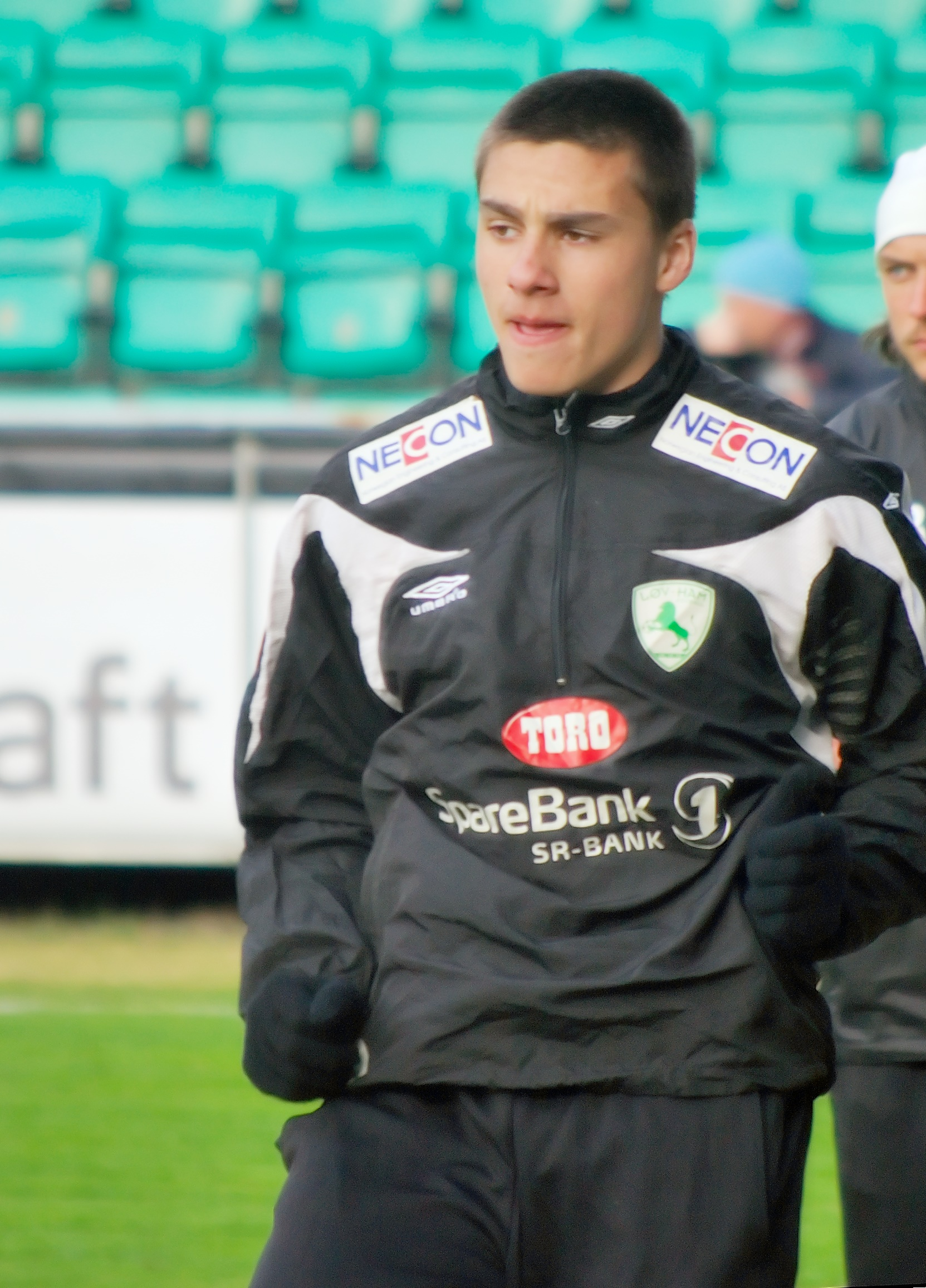

Personal information
- Full name: Kevin Duré
- Date of birth: 8 March 1993 (age 33)
- Place of birth: Bergen, Norway
- Position: Defender

Youth career
- –2009: Løv-Ham

Senior career*
Years	Team	Apps	(Gls)
2009–2011	Løv-Ham	28	(0)
2011–2014	Fredrikstad	29	(1)
2014–2015	Nest-Sotra	7	(1)
2015–2017	Åsane	1	(0)
- * Club domestic league appearances and goals

Kevin Duré (born 8 March 1993) is a retired Norwegian professional football player who played as a central defender. He has been on trial with the German clubs Werder Bremen and SC Freiburg, and the Austrian club Red Bull Salzburg.

== Club career ==
Dure was born in Bergen, and started his career in the youth department of Løv-Ham. He was on a trial with the Austrian club Red Bull Salzburg, but came home without a contract and was taken up in Løv-Ham first team squad in 2009 where he made his debut in Adeccoligaen against Moss FK on 26 July 2009.

In 2010 Dure came in as a substitute in Brann's friendly match against Leeds, and Brann, the biggest club in Bergen, wanted to sign Dure and Fredrik Haugen. Dure decided to refuse Brann's offer, because he wanted to play every week and the German clubs Werder Bremen and SC Freiburg had invited Dure on a trial. In July 2011, Dure was on a trial with Rosenborg, and in August 2011 he was chased by the Tippeligaen clubs Rosenborg, Start and Fredrikstad FK. On 22 August 2011 Dure signed a contract lasting till the end of 2014 with Fredrikstad, with a transfer fee of 1 million Norwegian kroner. On 17 September 2011 he made his debut in Tippeligaen, in Fredrikstad match against Molde FK

== International career ==
Dure have represented Norway at youth international level.

== Career statistics ==
As of 6 April 2015

Season	Club	Division	League		Cup		Total	
Season	Club	Division	Apps	Goals	Apps	Goals	Apps	Goals
2009	Løv-Ham	Adeccoligaen	1	0	0	0	1	0
2010	Løv-Ham	Adeccoligaen	10	0	0	0	10	0
2011	Løv-Ham	Adeccoligaen	17	0	1	0	18	0
2011	Fredrikstad	Tippeligaen	7	0	0	0	7	0
2012	Fredrikstad	Tippeligaen	6	1	0	0	6	1
2013	Fredrikstad	Adeccoligaen	12	0	0	0	12	0
2014	Fredrikstad	1. divisjon	4	0	1	0	5	0
2014	Nest-Sotra	1. divisjon	7	1	0	0	7	1
2015	Åsane	OBOS-ligaen	1	0	0	0	1	0
Career Total			65	2	2	0	67	2
