= Tróndur Jensen =

Faroese footballer (born 1993)

Personal information
- Date of birth: 6 February 1993
- Place of birth: Faroe Islands
- Position: Midfielder

Team information
- Current team: HB
- Number: 9

Senior career*
Years	Team	Apps	(Gls)
2011–2020	HB	157	(6)
2021	NSÍ	26	(2)
2022–	HB	4	(0)

International career^{‡}
2016–	Faroe Islands	2	(0)
- * Club domestic league appearances and goals as of 2 August 2023 ‡ National team caps and goals as of 3 June 2016

Tróndur Jensen (born 6 February 1993) is a Faroese footballer who plays for HB as a midfielder.

On 8 July 2014, he scored in a 5–2 home win over Gibraltar's Lincoln Red Imps in the UEFA Champions League first qualifying round second leg (6–3 aggregate).

He made his debut for the Faroe Islands national football team on 28 March 2016, playing the entirety of a 3–2 win over Liechtenstein at the Estadio Municipal de Marbella in Spain.

== Honours ==
- Faroe Islands Premier League: 2013
