= Gendt =

- City
- Flag Coat of arms

- Location within Gelderland Location within Netherlands
- Coordinates: 51°52′37″N 5°58′21″E
- Country: Netherlands
- Province: Gelderland
- Municipality: Lingewaard

Area
  - Total: 12.64 km^{2} (4.88 sq mi)

Population (2020)
  - Total: 7,230
- Demonym: Gendtenaar
- Website: groetenuitgendt.eu

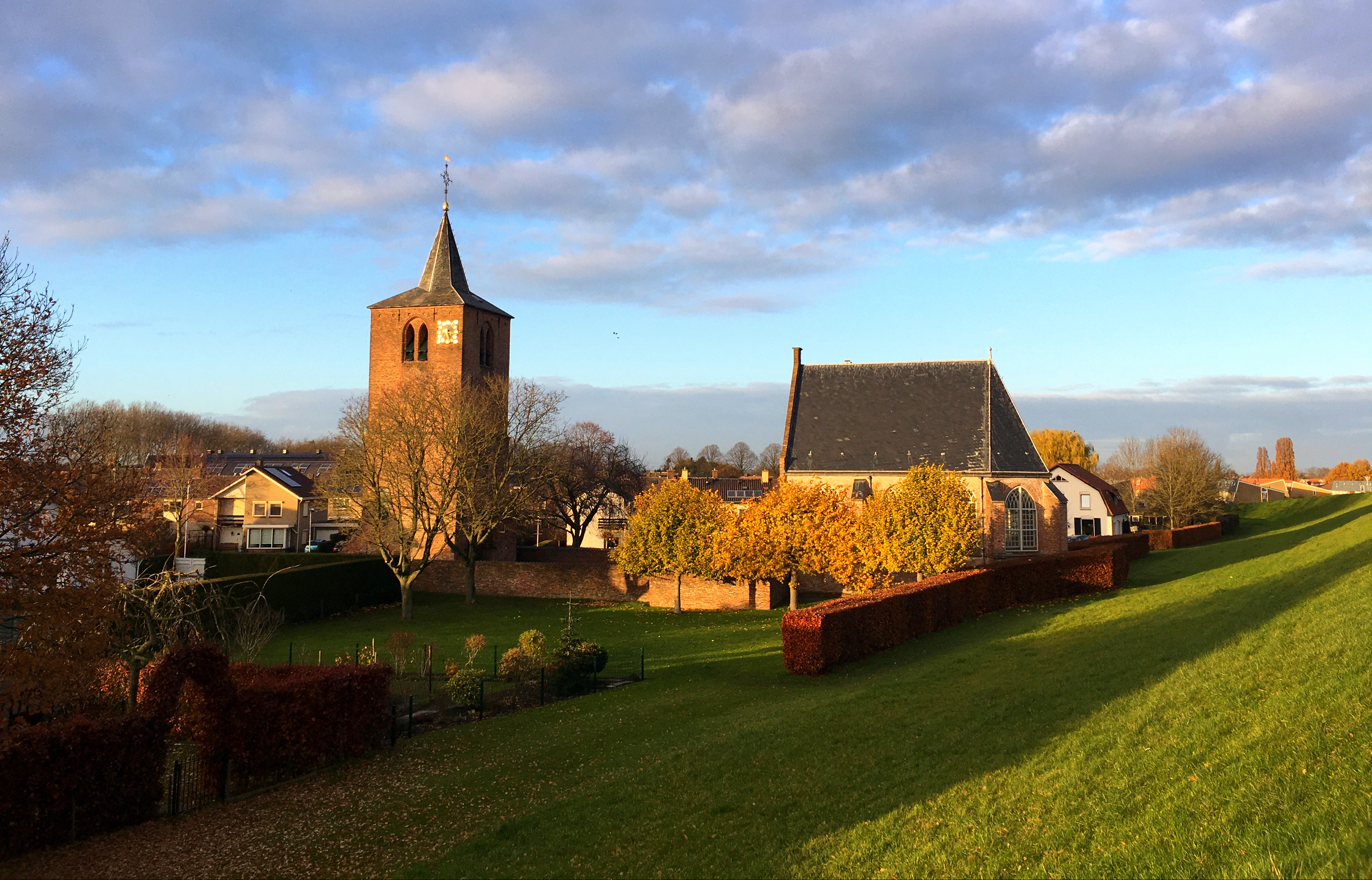
The Reformed church of Gendt

Gendt (Dutch pronunciation: [ɣɛnt]) is a small city with city rights in the Netherlands, in the province of Gelderland. The town is located in the Betuwe region, and is part of the municipality of Lingewaard. Gendt is situated along the rivers Waal and Linge. It has a population of 7,230 (as of 1 January 2020).

== History ==
In 1233, Gendt received city rights from Otto II, Count of Guelders. At the time, the town was known for its castles: Poelwijk Castle and Hof Gendt. Gendt was previously an independent municipality, but merged with Huissen and Bemmel in 2001, to form Lingewaard.

== Annual festivals ==
Notable annual festivals in Gendt include:

- Cherry Festival of Gendt (Dutch: Gendste Kersenfeest), an annual festival in Gendt, at the end of June (since 1938)
- Gendt funfair (Dutch: Gendste kermis), an annual festival in Gendt, at the weekend before the last Tuesday of August

== Notable residents ==
Notable people who were born, have lived or are living in Gendt include:

- Stijn Schaars (born 1984), a Dutch former football player with over 300 club caps
- Mirjam Melchers (born 1975), a Dutch former racing cyclist

== Twinned towns ==
Gendt is twinned with:

- Kalkar (Germany)

== Photo gallery ==
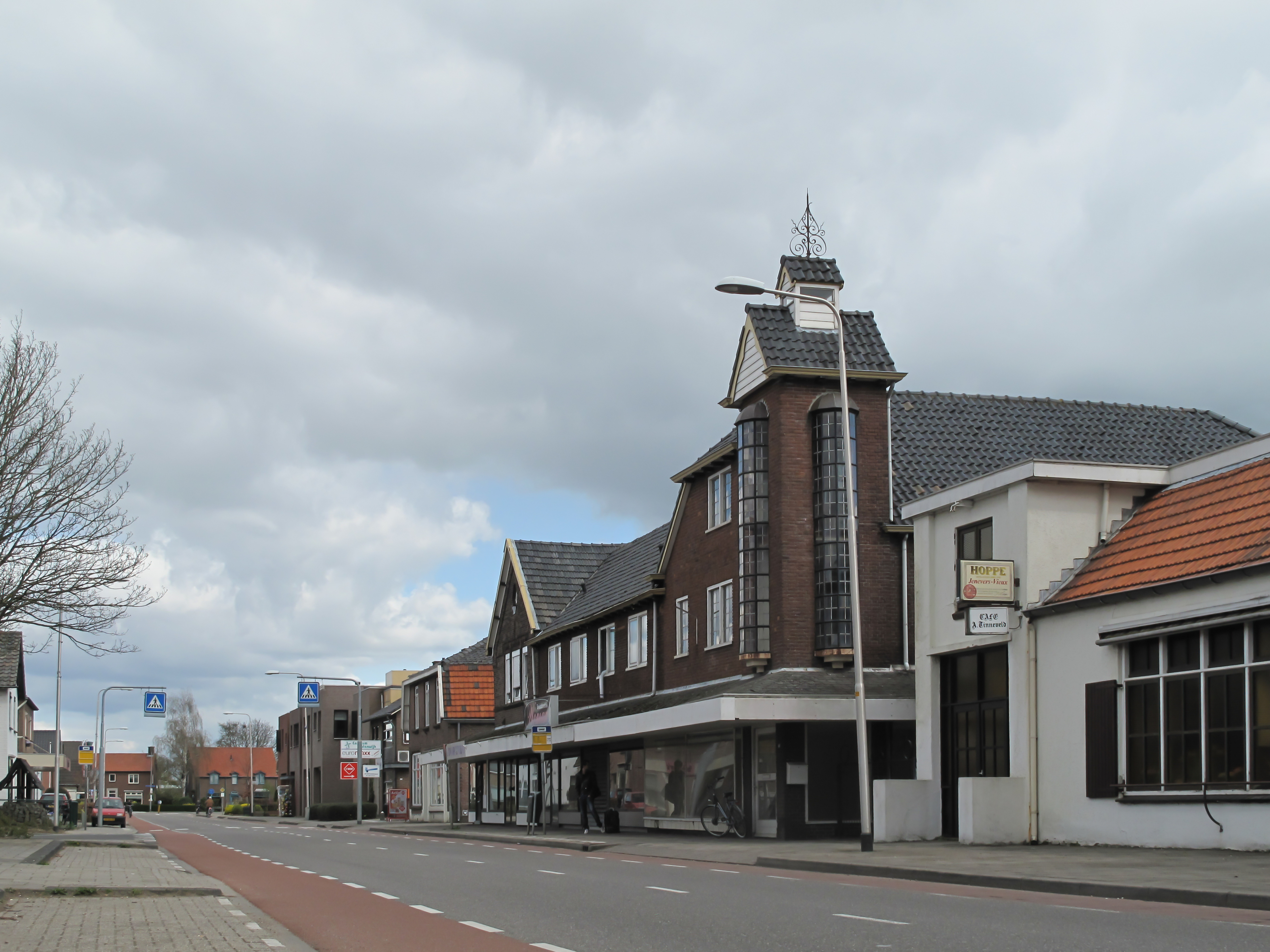
Main street of Gendt

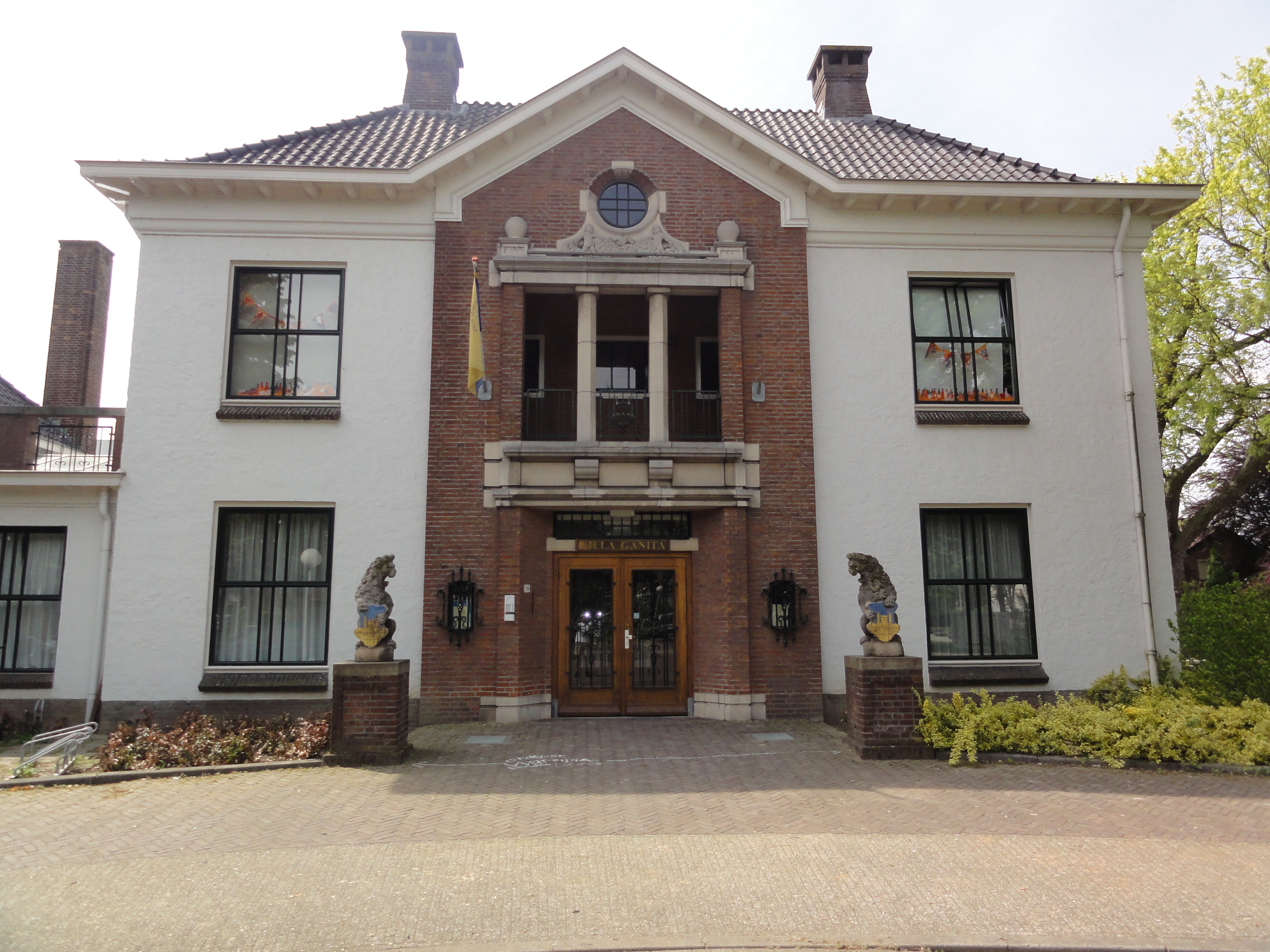
The former town hall

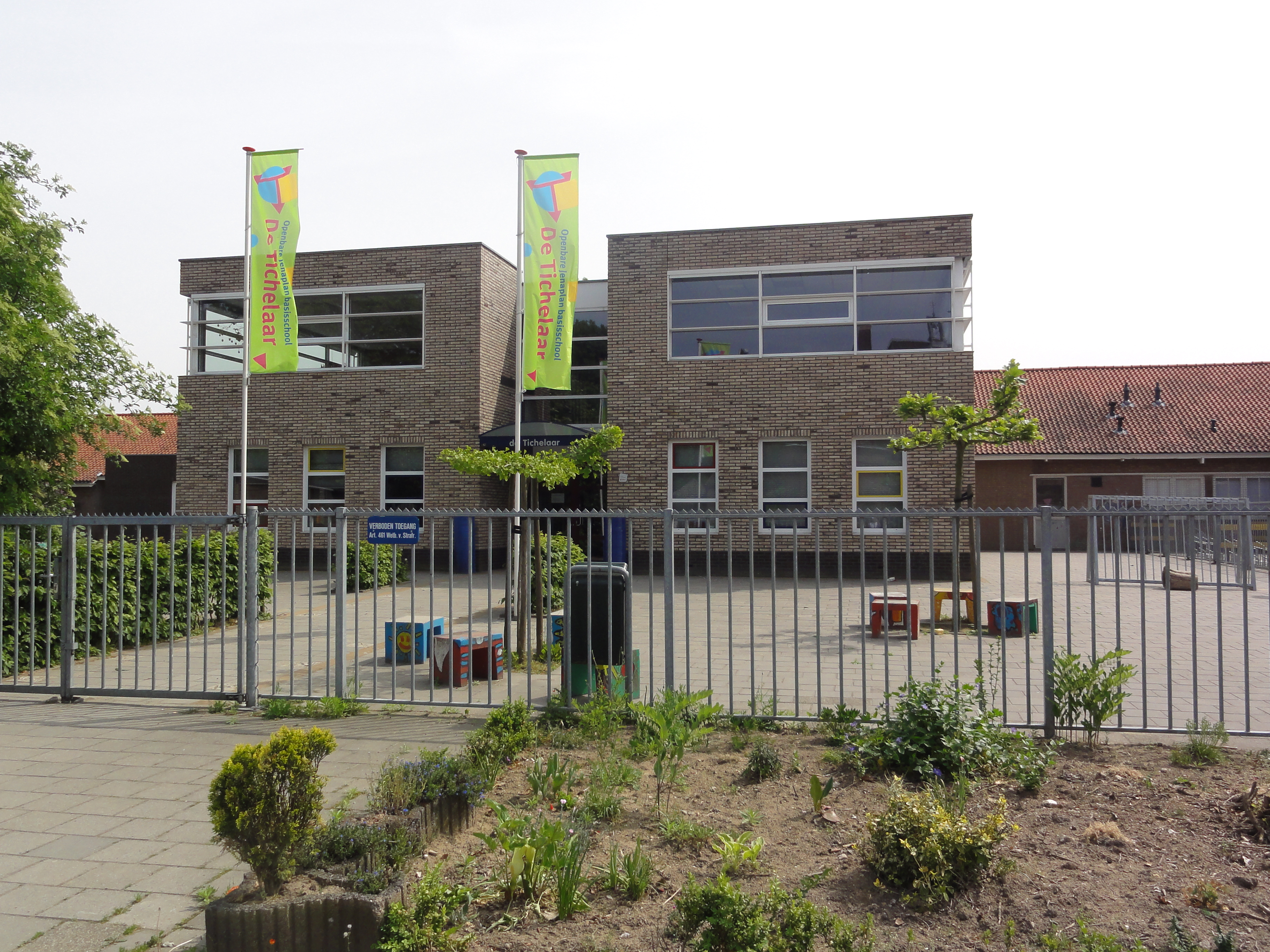
IKC 'De Tichelaar' (primary school)

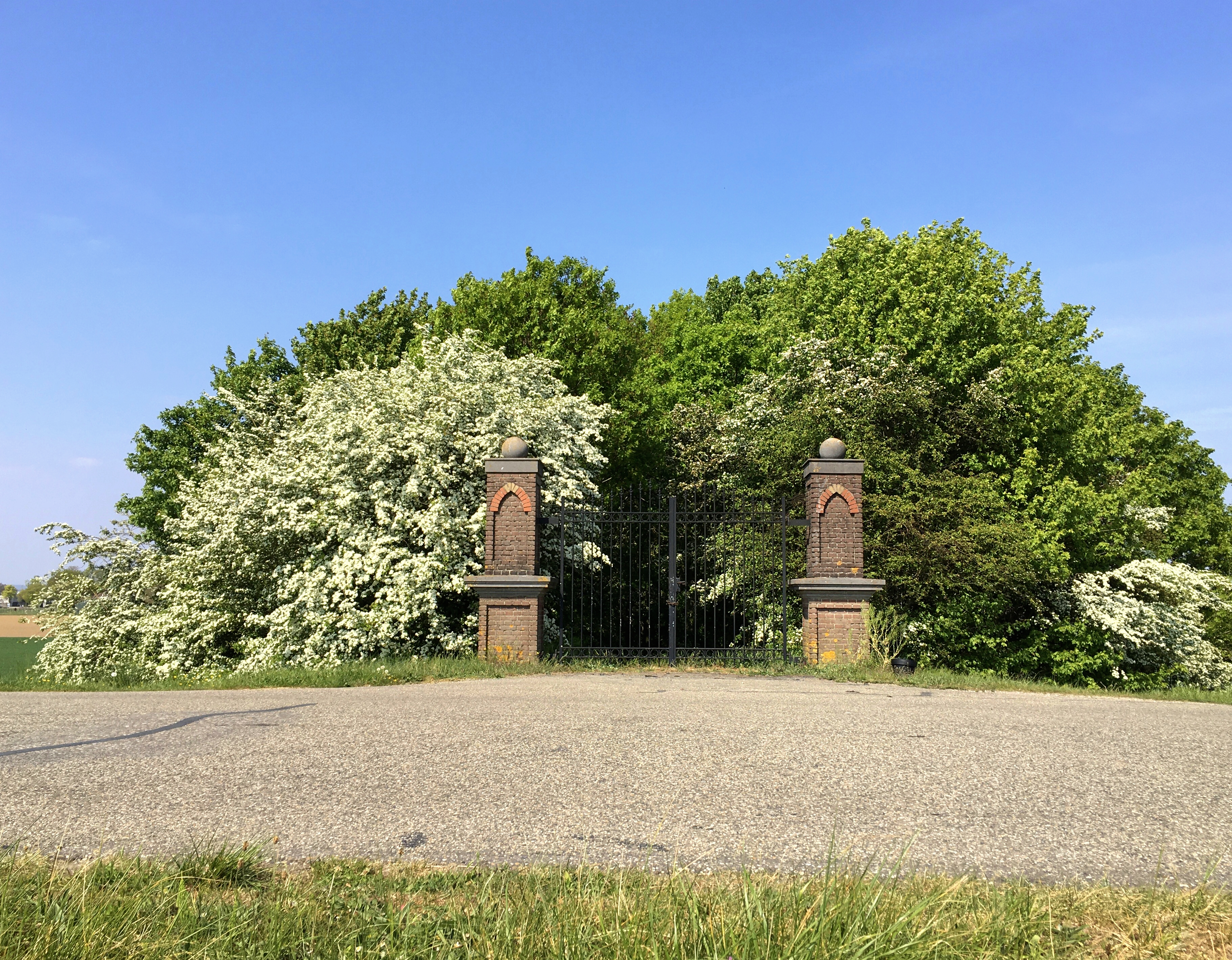
Old gateway to the estate of Hagevoort

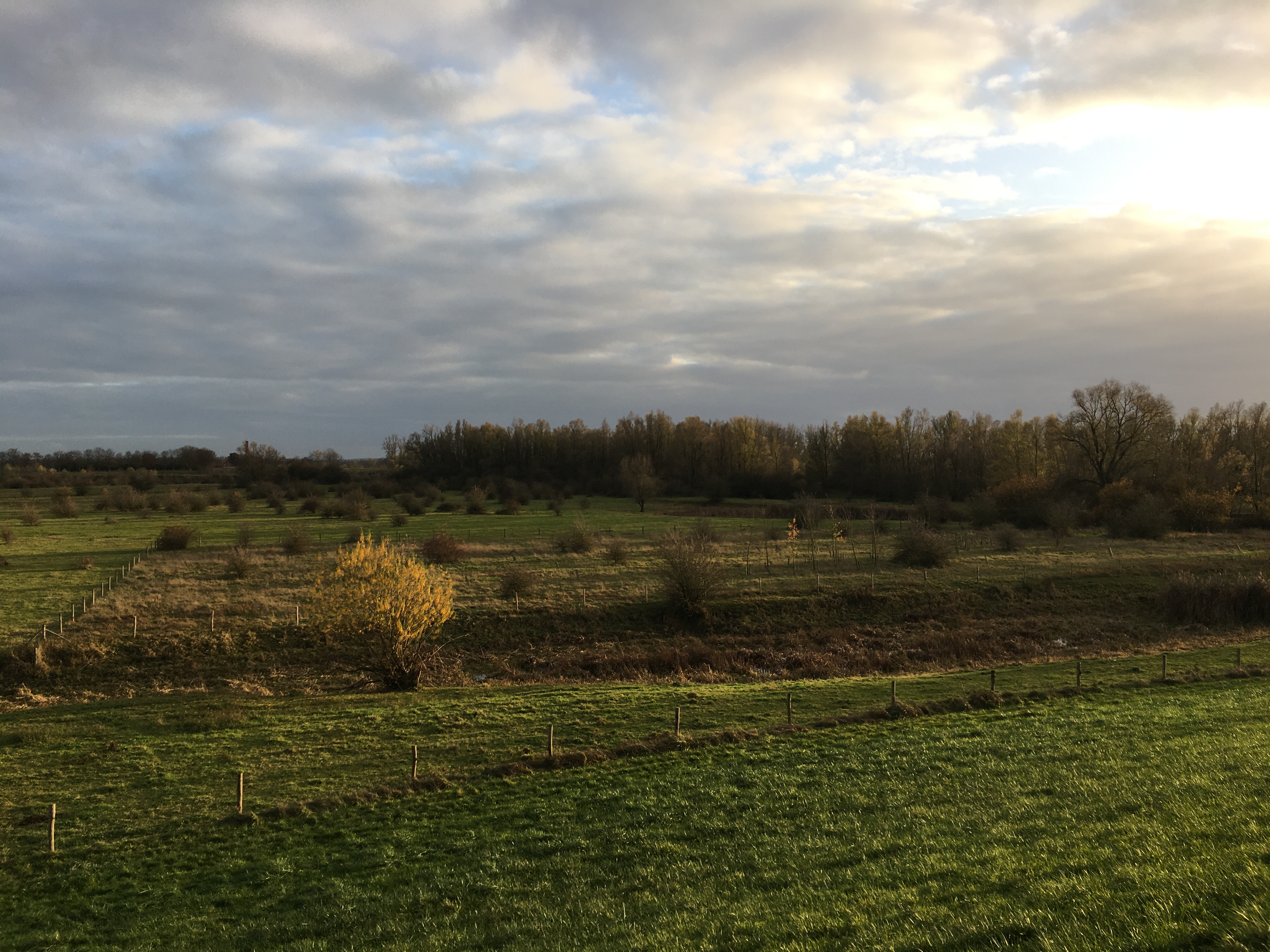
River forelands of the Waal river

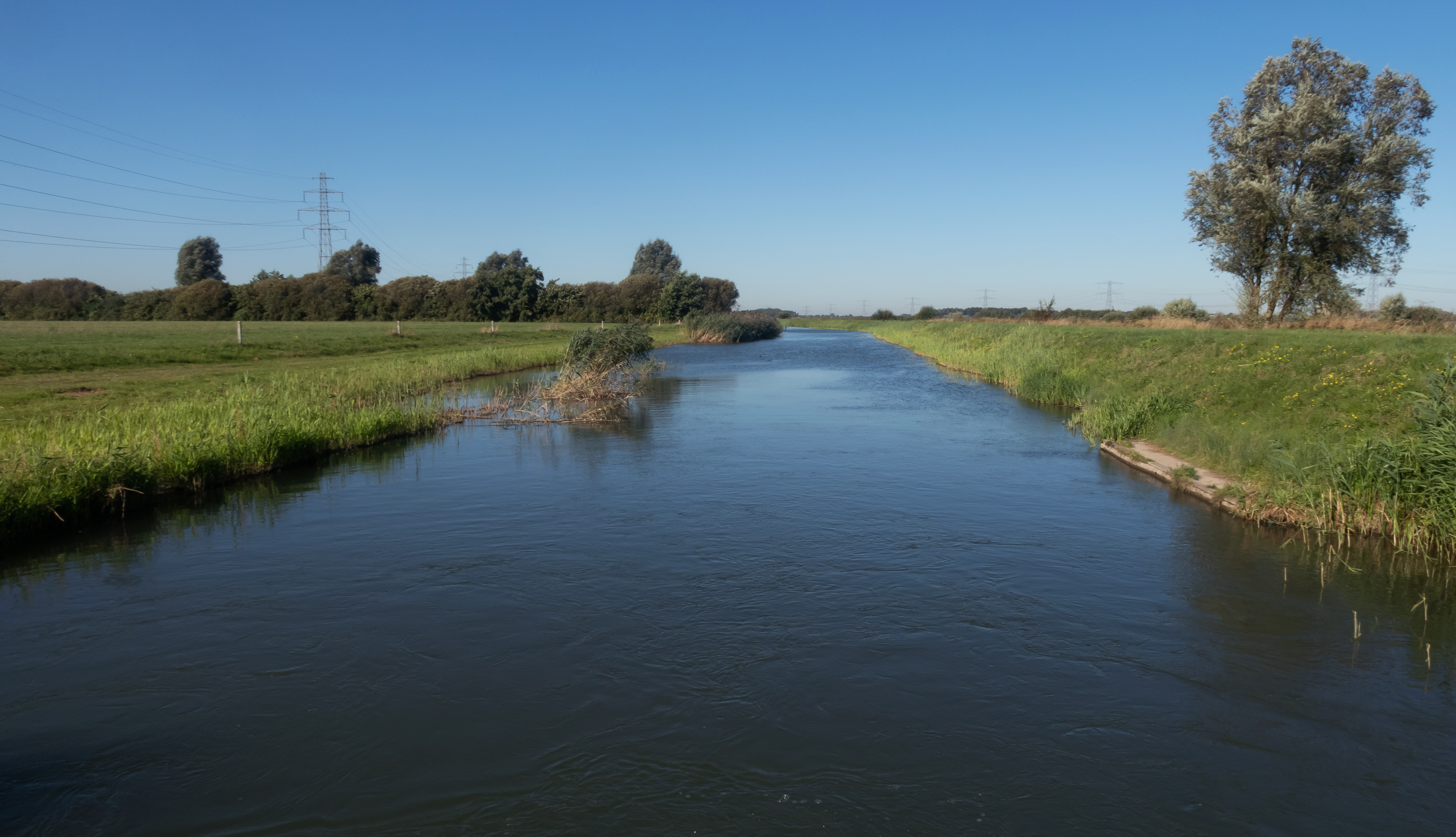
The Linge near Flieren (a hamlet of Gendt)

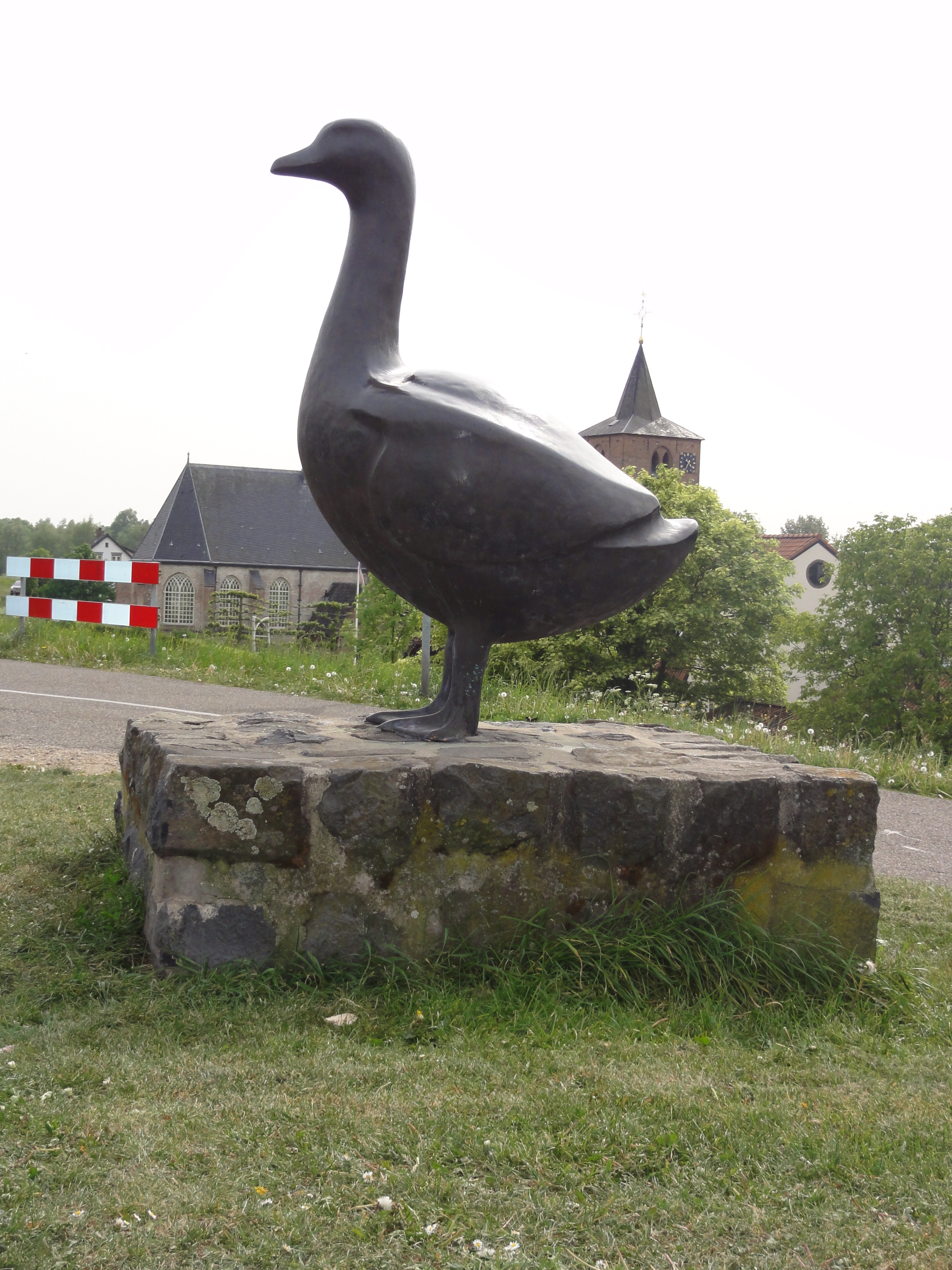
Sculpture 'The Gent' (known as town symbol)

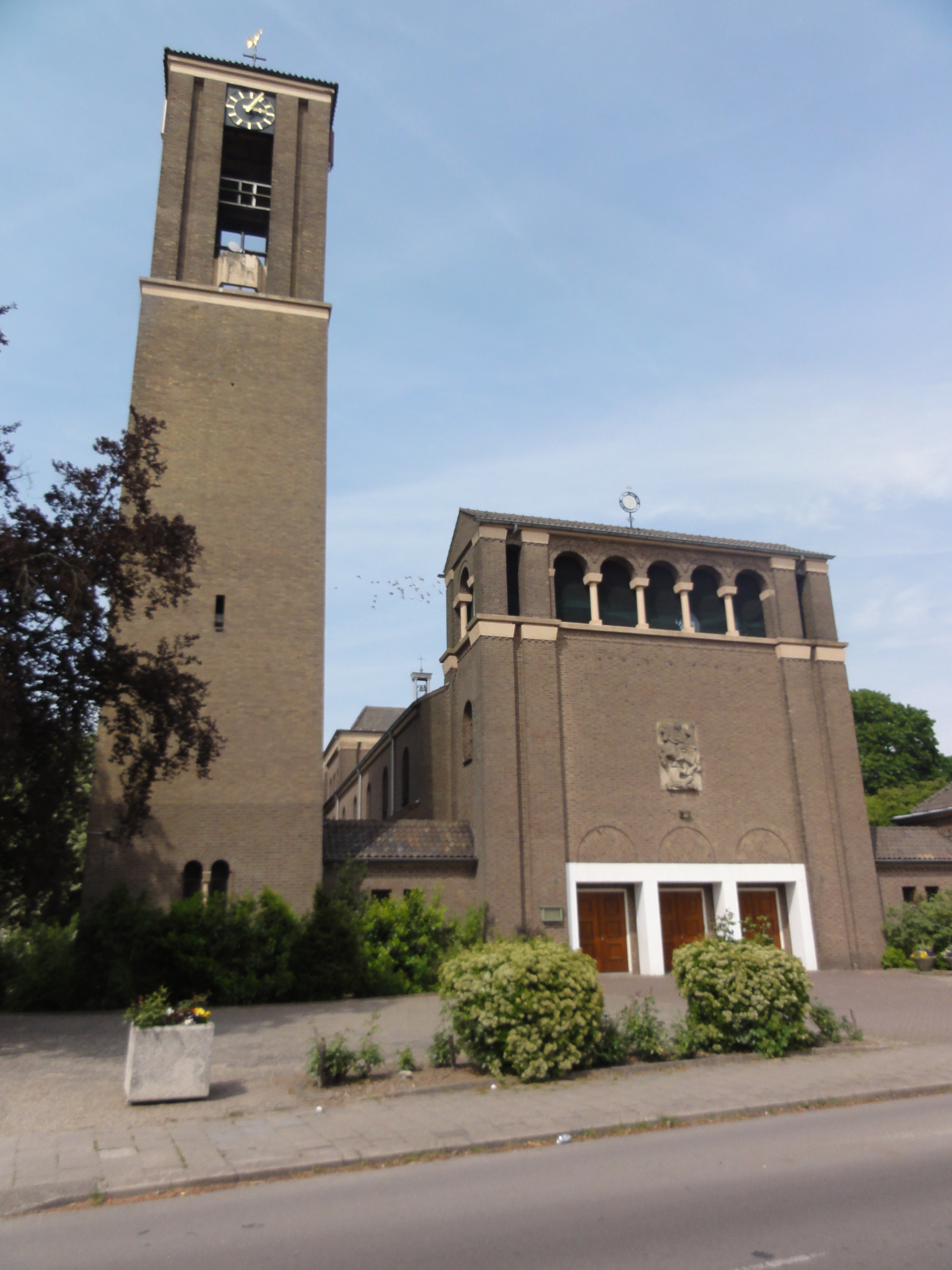
Former Catholic church 'Saint Martinus'

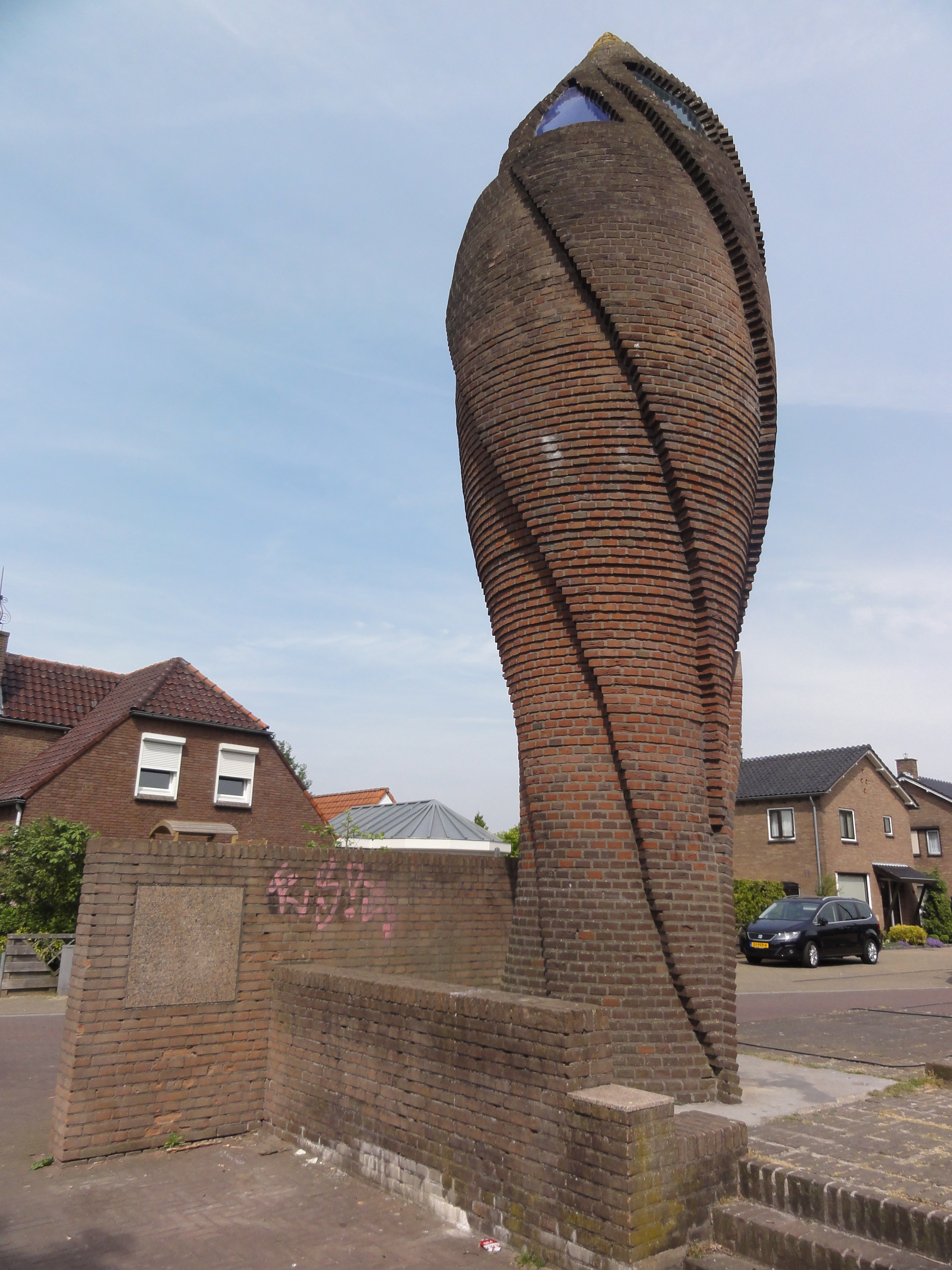
Monument 'The Flame' (Dutch: De Vlam)

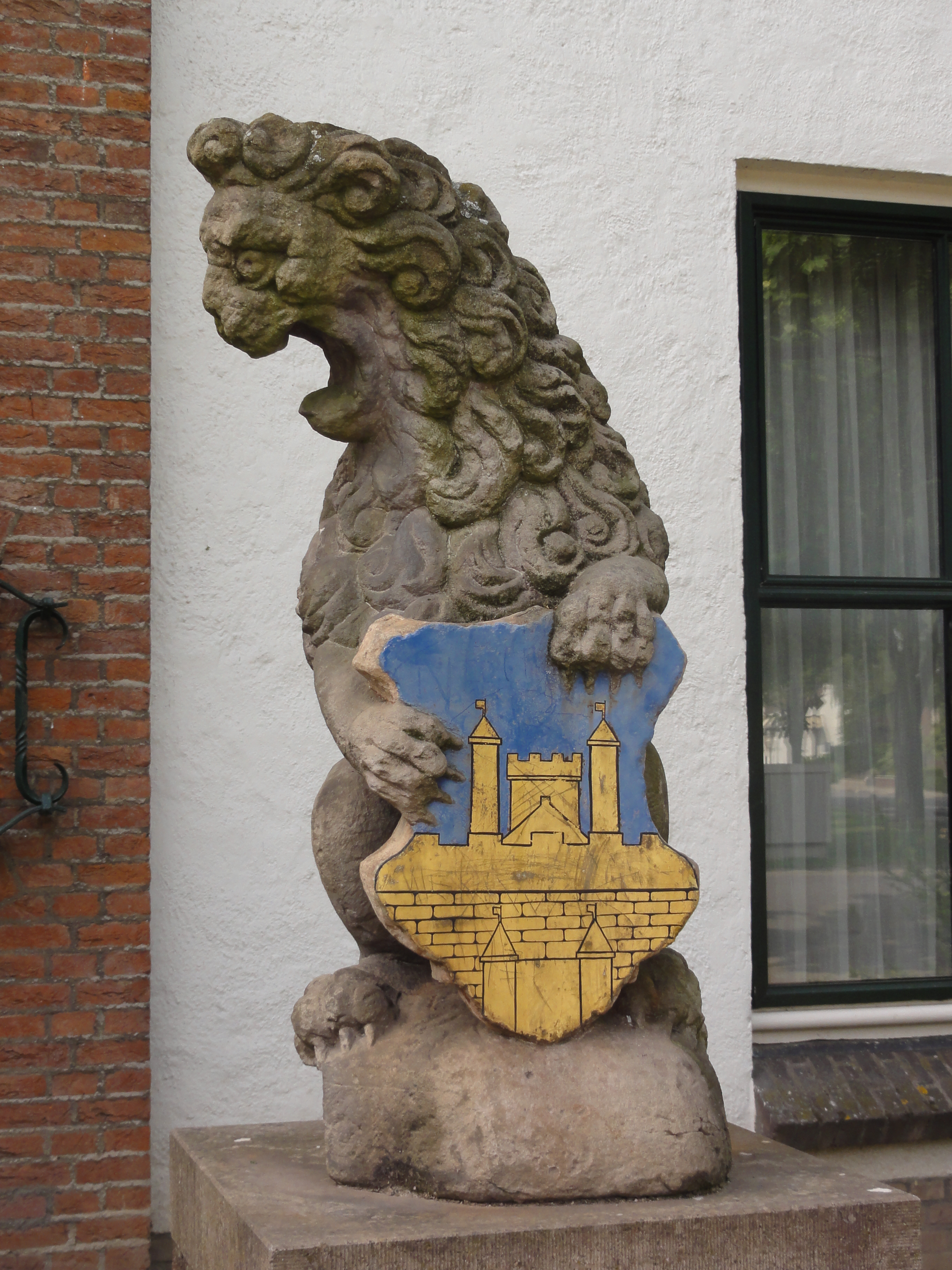
Town hall lion guardian with coat of arms

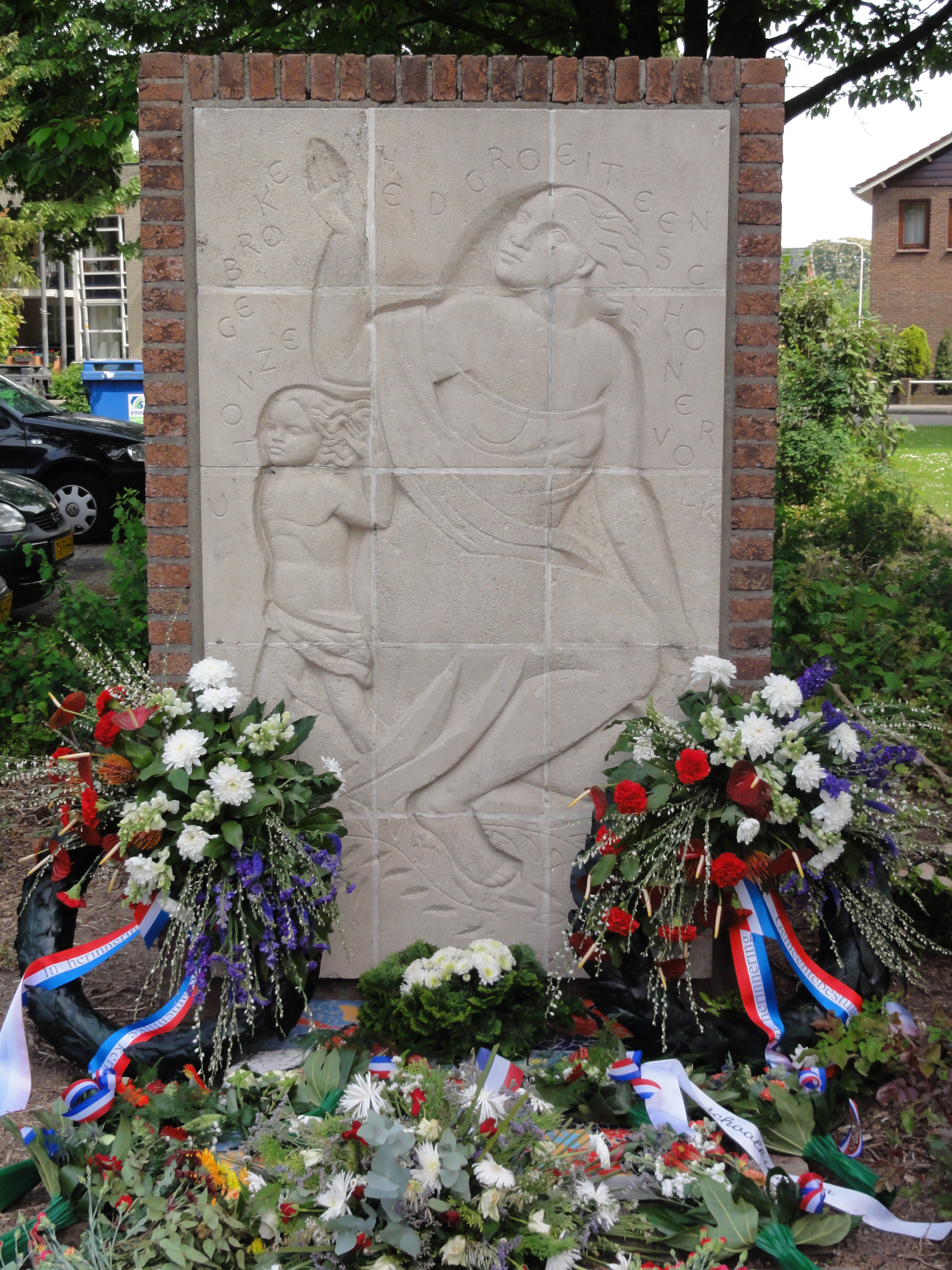
War memorial at the Pastoor Pelgrömlaan

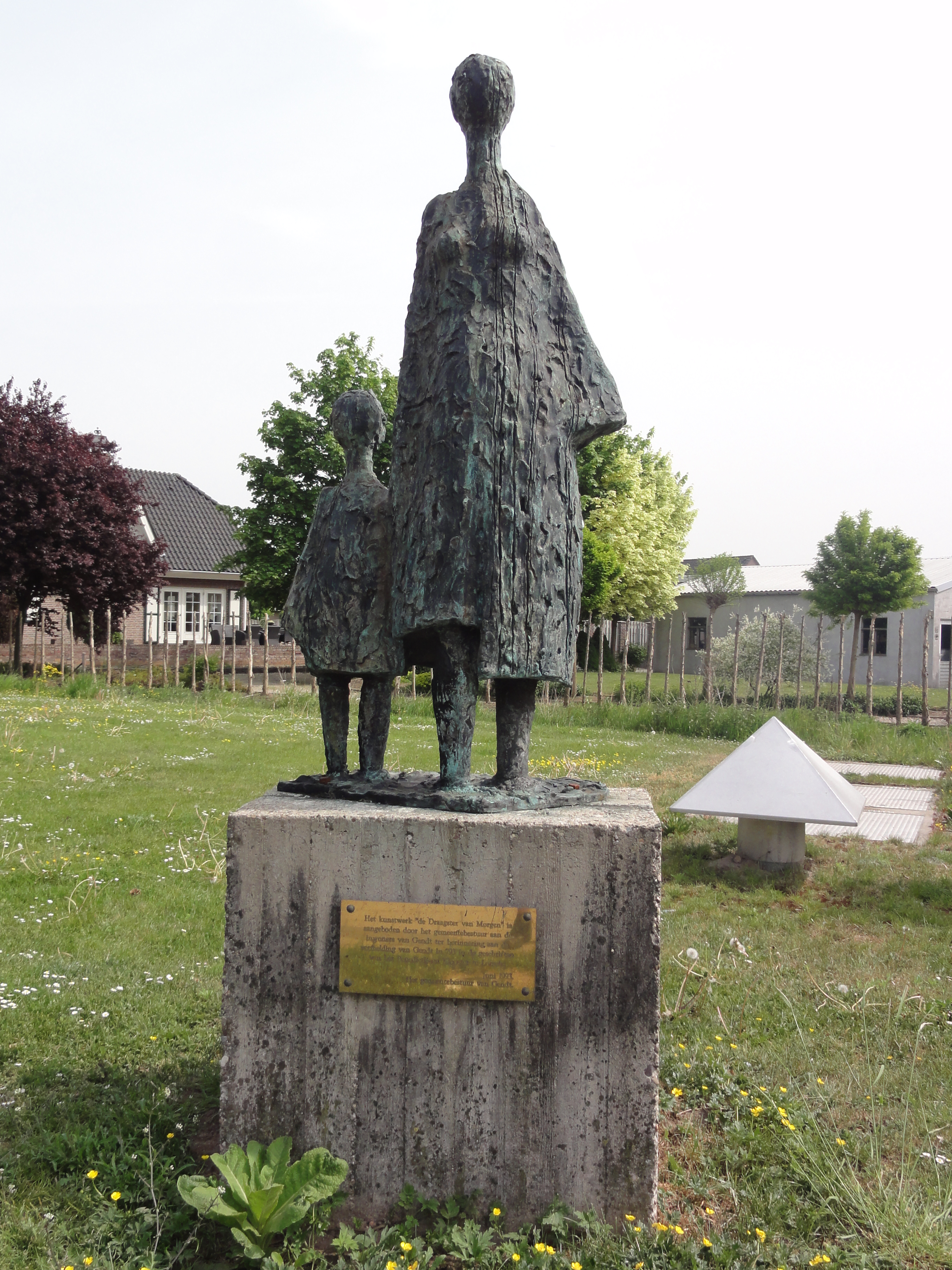
Sculpture De Draagster van Morgen

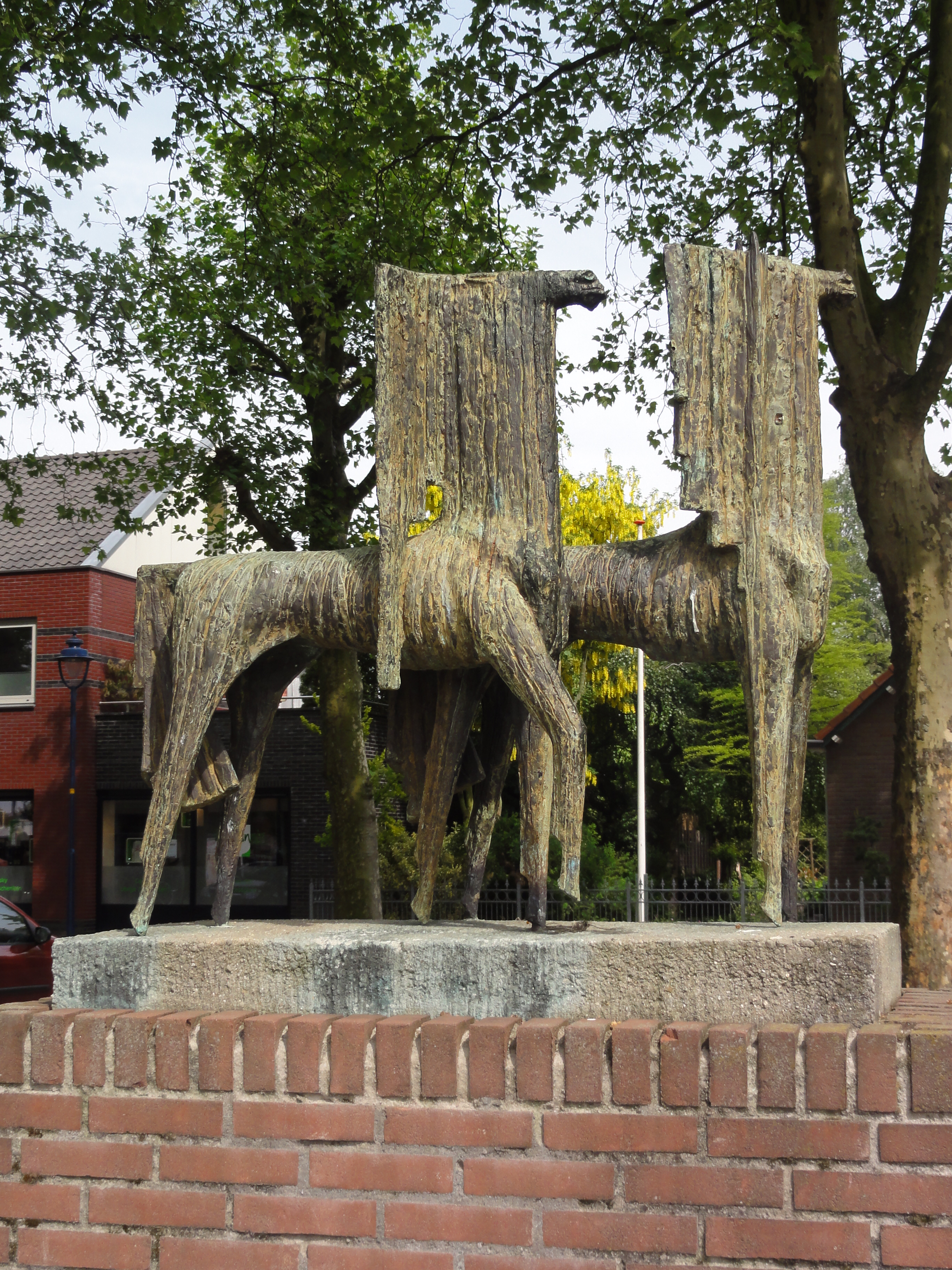
Sculpture 'Two Horses' (Dutch: Twee Paarden)

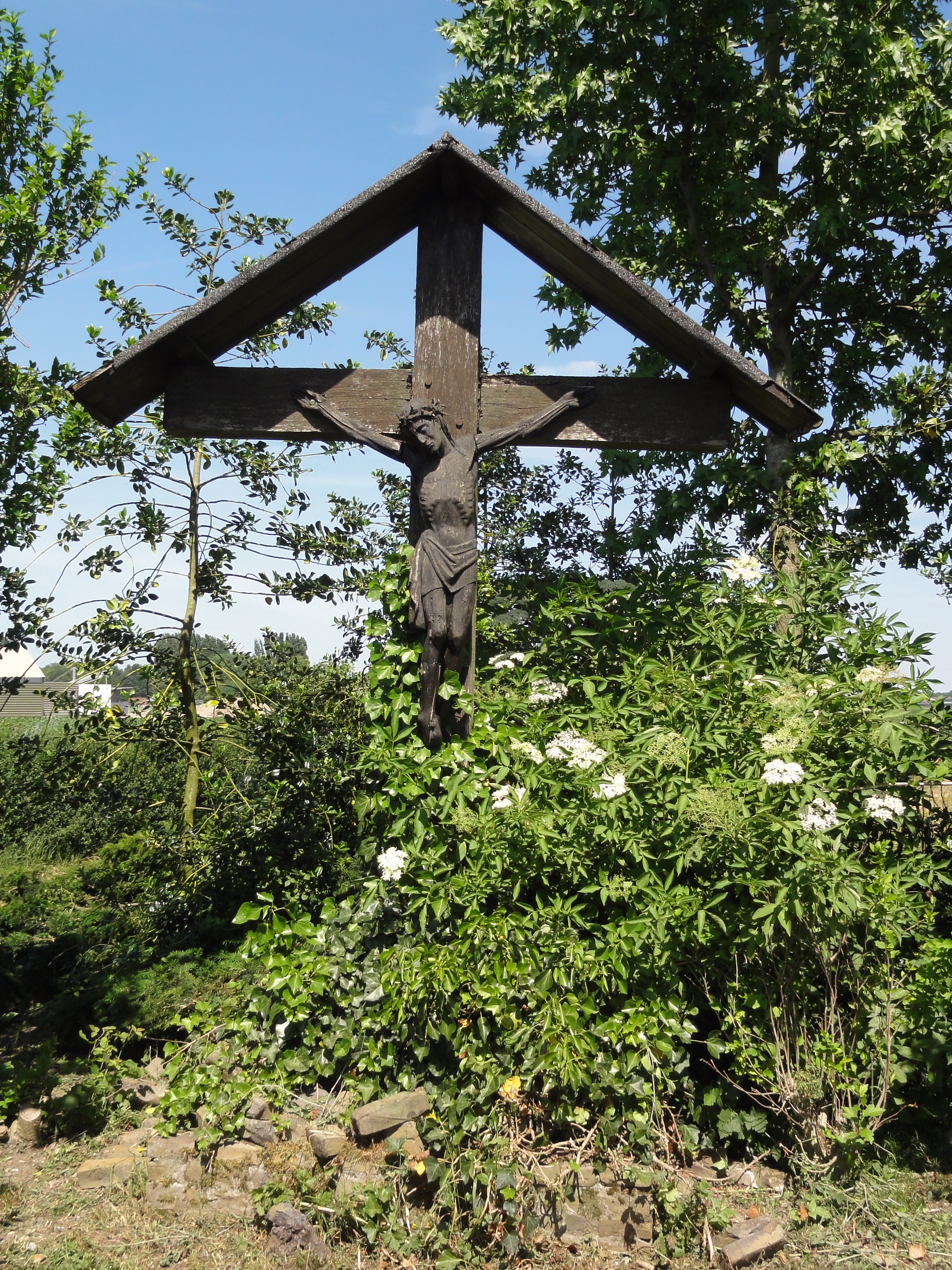
Wayside cross with a blooming black elder

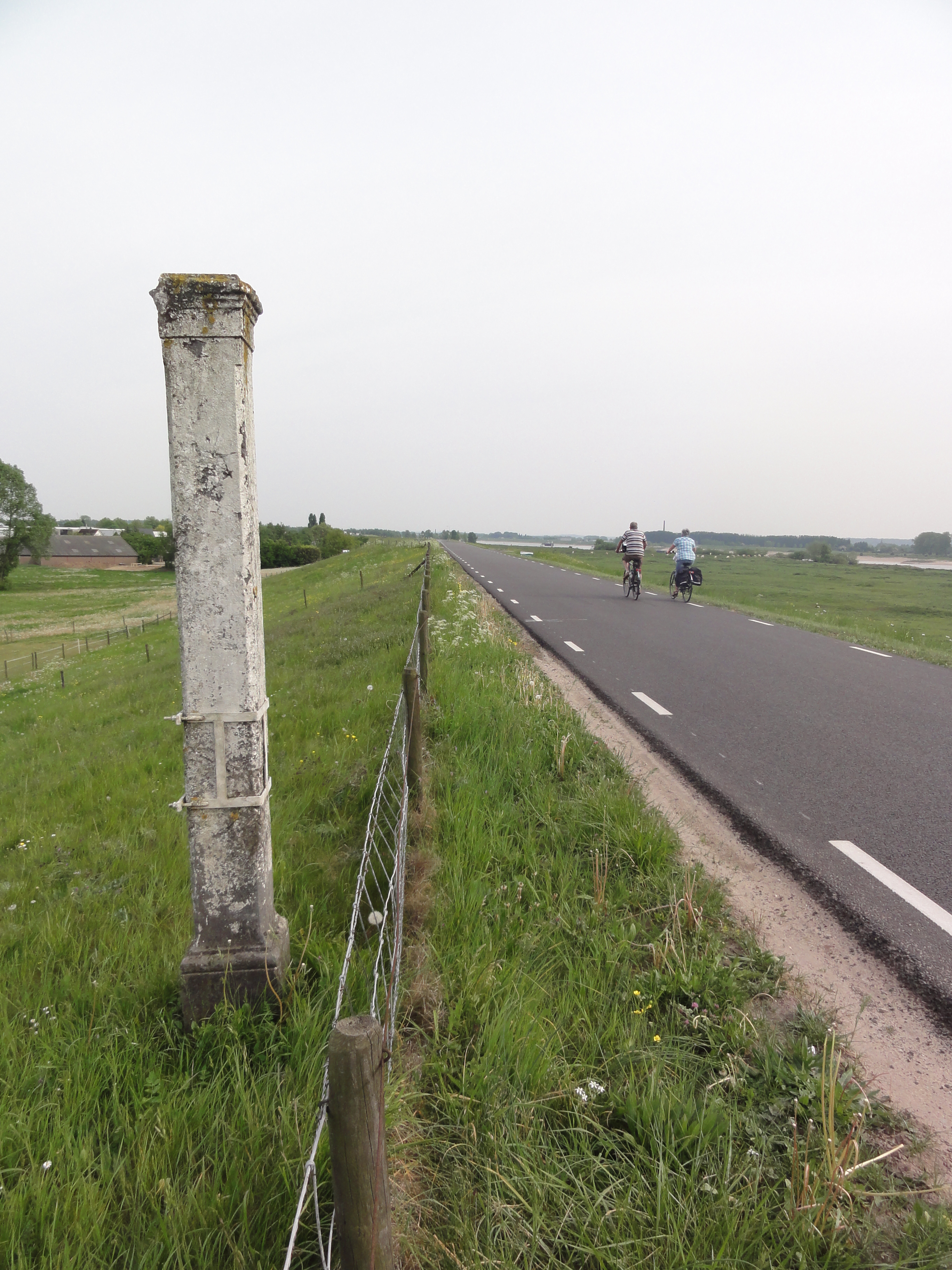
Boundary marker along the road on the Waaldijk
