= Emre Torun =

Turkish footballer

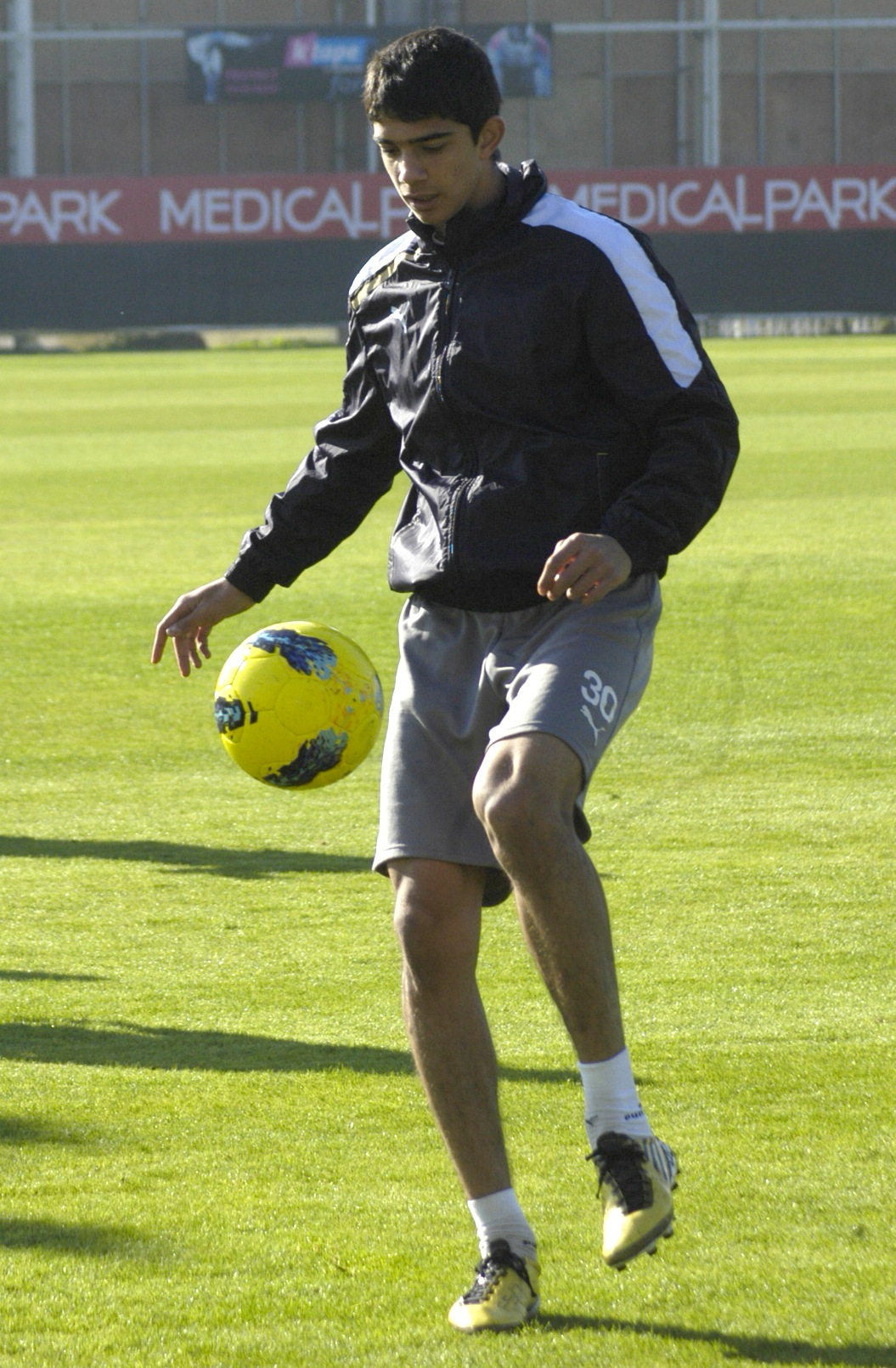
- Emre Torun in 2011.

Personal information
- Full name: Emre Torun
- Date of birth: 2 June 1993 (age 33)
- Place of birth: Altındağ, Turkey
- Height: 1.87 m (6 ft 2 in)
- Position: Forward

Team information
- Current team: Fethiyespor

Senior career*
Years	Team	Apps	(Gls)
2011–2012	Beypazarı Şekerspor	7	(2)
2012–2015	Antalyaspor	4	(0)
2013	→ Çaykur Rizespor (loan)	5	(0)
2014	→ 1461 Trabzon (loan)	15	(4)
2015	→ 1461 Trabzon (loan)	15	(1)
2015–2016	Tokatspor	30	(13)
2016–2018	Bugsaşspor	28	(9)
2018–2019	Konya Anadolu Selçukspor	25	(5)
2019–2020	Eyüpspor	13	(2)
2020–	Fethiyespor	0	(0)

International career
2011–2012	Turkey U19	8	(2)
- * Club domestic league appearances and goals as of 8 March 2020

Emre Torun (born 2 June 1993) is a Turkish footballer who plays for Fethiyespor.

== Career ==
He made his Süper Lig debut for Antalyaspor against Kayserispor on 27 August 2012.
