= Joe Frising =

Luxembourgish footballer (born 1984

Joe Frising (born 13 January 1994) is a Luxembourgish footballer who last played as a goalkeeper for UN Käerjéng 97.

== Early life ==
Frising attended Saarland University in Germany.

== Career ==
In 2016, he signed for Luxembourgish side F91 Dudelange, where he was regarded as a fan fsvorite. He was regarded as one of the club's most important players in the UEFA Europa League. In 2018, he was suspended for arguing with the manager. After leaving the club, he suffered injuries. In 2020, he signed for Luxembourgish side UN Käerjéng 97.

== Style of play ==
Frising has been described as "quite strong and well prepared mentally".

== Personal life ==
Frising has dated Luxembourg women's international Sophie Maurer.
