= FIFA U-17 World Cup records and statistics =

This is a list of records and statistics of the FIFA U-17 World Cup.

== Debut of national teams ==
Year	Debuting teams			Successor teams
Year	Teams	No.	Cum.	Successor teams
1985	Argentina, Australia, Bolivia, Brazil, China, Congo, Costa Rica, Guinea, Hungary, Italy, Mexico, Nigeria, Qatar, Saudi Arabia, United States, West Germany	16	16	
1987	Canada, Ecuador, Egypt, France, Ivory Coast, South Korea, Soviet Union	7	23	
1989	Bahrain, Colombia, Cuba, East Germany, Ghana, Portugal, Scotland	7	30	
1991	Spain, Sudan, United Arab Emirates, Uruguay	4	34	
1993	Chile, Czechoslovakia, Japan, Poland, Tunisia	5	39	
1995	Oman	1	40	
1997	Austria, Mali, New Zealand, Thailand	4	44	
1999	Burkina Faso, Jamaica, Paraguay	3	47	
2001	Croatia, Iran, Trinidad and Tobago	3	50	
2003	Cameroon, Finland, Sierra Leone, Yemen	4	54	
2005	Gambia, North Korea, Netherlands, Peru, Turkey	5	59	
2007	Belgium, England, Haiti, Honduras, Syria, Tajikistan, Togo	7	66	
2009	Algeria, Malawi, Switzerland	3	69	
2011	Denmark, Panama, Rwanda, Uzbekistan	4	73	Czech Republic
2013	Iraq, Morocco, Sweden, Venezuela	4	77	Russia; Slovakia
2015	South Africa	1	78	
2017	India, New Caledonia, Niger	3	81	
2019	Angola, Senegal, Solomon Islands	3	84	
2023	Indonesia	1	85	
2025	El Salvador, Fiji, Republic of Ireland, Uganda, Zambia	5	90	
2026	Dominican Republic, Greece, Montenegro, Mozambique, Romania, Serbia, Tanzania, Vietnam	8	98	

== Overall team records ==
In this ranking 3 points are awarded for a win, 1 for a draw and 0 for a loss. As per statistical convention in football, matches decided in extra time are counted as wins and losses, while matches decided by penalty shoot-outs are counted as draws. Teams are ranked by total points, then by goal difference, then by goals scored.

As of 2025 FIFA U-17 World Cup

Rank	Team	Part	Pld	W	D	L	GF	GA	GD	Points
1	Brazil	19	102	66	16	20	230	91	+139	214
2	Nigeria	12	67	48	11	8	158	52	+106	155
3	Argentina	16	76	37	16	23	130	93	+37	127
4	Spain	11	58	36	10	12	131	71	+60	118
5	Mexico	16	74	35	13	26	127	109	+18	118
6	Germany	12	60	30	12	18	130	88	+42	102
7	Ghana	9	48	30	10	8	94	39	+55	100
8	France	9	47	29	10	8	109	46	+63	97
9	United States	19	71	27	8	36	99	120	–21	89
10	Mali	7	37	21	4	12	68	33	+35	67
11	Italy	9	40	19	7	14	52	42	+10	64
12	Australia	13	51	18	9	24	57	79	–22	63
13	Japan	11	43	18	8	17	61	53	+8	62
14	England	6	30	16	6	7	72	34	+38	54
15	Uruguay	6	27	12	4	11	45	33	+12	40
16	Paraguay	6	23	12	4	7	49	39	+10	40
17	South Korea	8	31	12	4	15	36	46	–10	40
18	Colombia	7	31	10	9	12	46	44	+2	39
19	Portugal	4	22	11	4	7	50	37	+13	37
20	Switzerland	2	13	11	1	1	31	13	+18	34
21	Ecuador	6	24	10	3	11	32	34	–2	33
22	Burkina Faso	6	25	9	5	11	27	31	–4	32
23	Iran	5	20	9	4	7	33	24	+9	31
24	Uzbekistan	4	19	9	3	7	32	25	+7	30
25	Costa Rica	11	39	7	9	23	32	64	–32	30
26	Netherlands	4	19	8	2	9	32	31	+1	26
27	Chile	6	23	6	7	10	36	45	–9	25
28	Qatar	8	29	6	8	15	24	48	–24	25
29	Russia	3	14	7	3	4	32	17	+15	24
30	Turkey	3	14	7	3	4	26	20	+6	24
31	Saudi Arabia	4	16	6	6	4	21	16	+5	24
32	Belgium	3	14	7	1	6	24	19	+5	22
33	Austria	3	14	7	1	6	22	22	0	22
34	Croatia	4	15	6	4	5	20	20	0	22
35	Ivory Coast	5	20	6	4	10	30	37	–7	22
36	North Korea	6	23	5	7	11	25	39	–14	22
37	Morocco	3	15	6	3	6	35	23	+12	21
38	Tunisia	4	15	7	0	8	22	22	0	21
39	Senegal	3	12	6	2	4	20	10	+10	20
40	China	6	20	4	7	9	24	36	–12	19
41	New Zealand	11	36	4	6	26	23	111	–88	18
42	Oman	3	13	5	2	6	19	21	–2	17
43	Guinea	5	18	4	5	9	20	30	–10	17
44	Sweden	1	7	4	1	2	15	11	+4	13
45	Czech Republic	3	11	4	1	6	17	18	–1	13
46	Poland	3	12	3	4	5	17	20	–3	13
47	Scotland	1	6	3	3	0	8	3	+5	12
48	Egypt	3	11	3	3	5	15	16	–1	12
49	Bahrain	2	9	3	2	4	9	13	–4	11
50	Venezuela	3	11	3	2	6	16	24	–8	11
51	Honduras	6	21	3	1	17	22	59	–37	10
52	Peru	2	8	2	3	3	4	7	–3	9
53	Canada	9	28	1	6	21	15	74	–59	9
54	Republic of Ireland	1	5	2	2	1	8	6	+2	8
55	Uganda	1	5	2	2	1	5	4	+1	8
56	Hungary	2	7	2	2	3	11	12	–1	8
57	Congo	3	10	2	2	6	10	18	–8	8
58	Zambia	1	4	2	1	1	10	7	+3	7
59	Gambia	2	6	2	1	3	9	10	–1	7
60	Tajikistan	3	10	2	1	7	10	24	–14	7
61	East Germany	1	4	2	0	2	7	5	+2	6
62	Angola	1	4	2	0	2	4	5	–1	6
63	South Africa	2	7	1	2	4	7	13	–6	5
64	Indonesia	2	6	1	2	3	6	13	–7	5
65	Syria	2	7	1	2	4	5	13	–8	5
66	Panama	4	13	1	2	10	9	29	–20	5
67	United Arab Emirates	4	13	1	2	10	9	35	–26	5
68	Slovakia	1	4	1	1	2	7	12	–5	4
69	Iraq	2	7	1	1	5	7	22	–15	4
70	Sudan	1	3	1	0	2	5	5	0	3
71	Cameroon	2	6	0	3	3	8	13	–5	3
72	Niger	1	4	1	0	3	1	8	–7	3
73	Finland	1	3	1	0	2	3	12	–9	3
74	Bolivia	3	9	0	3	6	9	22	–13	3
75	Togo	1	3	0	2	1	2	3	–1	2
76	New Caledonia	3	9	0	2	7	3	59	–56	2
77	Sierra Leone	1	3	0	1	2	6	8	–2	1
78	Rwanda	1	3	0	1	2	0	3	–3	1
79	Yemen	1	3	0	1	2	4	8	–4	1
80	Denmark	1	3	0	1	2	3	8	–5	1
81	Jamaica	2	6	0	1	5	2	14	–12	1
82	El Salvador	1	3	0	1	2	0	12	–12	1
83	Cuba	2	6	0	1	5	5	18	–13	1
84	Haiti	3	9	0	1	8	10	32	–22	1
85	Algeria	1	3	0	0	3	0	5	–5	0
86	Malawi	1	3	0	0	3	1	7	–6	0
87	India	1	3	0	0	3	1	9	–8	0
88	Trinidad and Tobago	2	6	0	0	6	3	23	–20	0
89	Fiji	1	3	0	0	3	0	20	–20	0
89	Solomon Islands	1	3	0	0	3	0	20	–20	0
91	Thailand	2	6	0	0	6	5	29	–24	0
92	Greece	0	0	0	0	0	0	0	0	0
92	Montenegro	0	0	0	0	0	0	0	0	0
92	Mozambique	0	0	0	0	0	0	0	0	0
92	Romania	0	0	0	0	0	0	0	0	0
92	Serbia	0	0	0	0	0	0	0	0	0
92	Tanzania	0	0	0	0	0	0	0	0	0
92	Vietnam	0	0	0	0	0	0	0	0	0

== Teams that have finished in the top four ==
Team	Titles	Runners-up	Third place	Fourth place
Nigeria	5 (1985, 1993, 2007, 2013, 2015)	3 (1987, 2001, 2009)		
Brazil	4 (1997, 1999, 2003, 2019)	2 (1995, 2005)	2 (1985, 2017)	2 (2011, 2025)
Ghana	2 (1991, 1995)	2 (1993, 1997)	1 (1999)	1 (2007)
Mexico	2 (2005, 2011)	2 (2013, 2019)		1 (2015)
Germany^{1}	1 (2023)	1 (1985)	2 (2007, 2011)	1 (1997)
France	1 (2001)	1 (2023)	1 (2019)	
Portugal	1 (2025)		1 (1989)	
Russia	1 (1987)			
Saudi Arabia	1 (1989)			
Switzerland	1 (2009)			
England	1 (2017)			
Spain		4 (1991, 2003, 2007, 2017)	2 (1997, 2009)	
Mali		1 (2015)	1 (2023)	1 (2017)
Scotland		1 (1989)		
Australia		1 (1999)		
Uruguay		1 (2011)		
Austria		1 (2025)		
Argentina			3 (1991, 1995, 2003)	3 (2001, 2013, 2023)
Netherlands			1 (2005)	1 (2019)
Italy			1 (2025)	1 (1987)
Ivory Coast			1 (1987)	
Chile			1 (1993)	
Burkina Faso			1 (2001)	
Sweden			1 (2013)	
Belgium			1 (2015)	
Colombia				2 (2003, 2009)
Guinea				1 (1985)
Bahrain				1 (1989)
Qatar				1 (1991)
Poland				1 (1993)
Oman				1 (1995)
United States				1 (1999)
Turkey				1 (2005)

^{1}includes results representing West Germany

== Comprehensive team results by tournament ==
Legend

- 1st – Champions
- 2nd – Runners-up
- 3rd – Third place
- 4th – Fourth place
- QF – Quarter-finals
- R3 – Round 3 (since 2025: knockout round of 16)
- R2 – Round 2 (2007–2023: knockout round of 16; since 2025: knockout round of 32)
- R1 – Round 1 (group stage)
- • – Did not qualify
- × – Did not enter / Withdrew
- X – Disqualified
- XX – Country did not exist or national team was inactive
- – Hosts
- W – Qualified / Withdrew
- Q – Qualified for upcoming tournament

For each tournament, the flag of the host country and the number of teams in each finals tournament (in brackets) are shown.

Team	Confederation	1985 (China) (16)	1987 (Canada) (16)	1989 (Scotland) (16)	1991 (Italy) (16)	1993 (Japan) (16)	1995 (Ecuador) (16)	1997 (Egypt) (16)	1999 (New Zealand) (16)	2001 (Trinidad and Tobago) (16)	2003 (Finland) (16)	2005 (Peru) (16)	2007 (South Korea) (24)	2009 (Nigeria) (24)	2011 (Mexico) (24)	2013 (United Arab Emirates) (24)	2015 (Chile) (24)	2017 (India) (24)	2019 (Brazil) (24)	2023 (Indonesia) (24)	2025 (Qatar) (48)	2026 (Qatar) (48)	Total
Algeria	CAF	•	•	•	•	•	•	•	•	•	•	•	•	R1	•	•	×	•	•	•	•	Q	2
Angola	CAF	×	×	×	×	×	•	•	•	•	•	•	•	•	•	•	•	•	R2	X	•	•	1
Argentina	CONMEBOL	R1	•	QF	3rd	R1	3rd	QF	•	4th	3rd	•	QF	R2	R2	4th	R1	•	R2	4th	R2	Q	17
Australia	AFC	QF	QF	R1	QF	QF	QF	•	2nd	QF	R1	R1	•	•	R2	•	R2	•	R2	•	•	Q	14
Austria	UEFA	•	•	•	•	•	•	R1	•	•	•	•	•	•	•	R1	•	•	•	•	2nd	•	3
Bahrain	AFC	•	•	4th	•	•	•	R1	•	•	•	•	•	•	•	•	•	•	•	•	•	•	2
Belgium	UEFA	•	•	•	•	•	•	•	•	•	•	•	R1	•	•	•	3rd	•	•	•	R2	Q	4
Bolivia	CONMEBOL	R1	R1	•	•	•	•	•	•	•	•	•	•	•	•	•	•	•	•	•	R1	•	3
Brazil	CONMEBOL	3rd	R1	QF	QF	•	2nd	1st	1st	QF	1st	2nd	R2	R1	4th	QF	QF	3rd	1st	QF	4th	Q	20
Burkina Faso	CAF	•	•	•	•	•	•	•	R1	3rd	•	•	•	R2	R1	•	•	•	•	R1	QF	•	6
Cameroon	CAF	•	•	•	•	•	•	•	•	•	R1	•	•	•	•	•	•	•	R1	•	•	Q	3
Canada	CONCACAF	•	R1	R1	•	R1	R1	•	•	•	•	•	•	•	R1	R1	•	•	R1	R1	R2	•	9
Chile	CONMEBOL	•	•	•	•	3rd	•	R1	•	•	•	•	•	•	•	•	R2	R1	R2	•	R1	Q	7
China	AFC	QF	•	R1	R1	R1	•	•	•	•	R1	QF	•	•	•	•	•	•	•	•	•	Q	7
Colombia	CONMEBOL	•	•	R1	•	R1	•	•	•	•	4th	•	R2	4th	•	•	•	R2	•	•	R2	Q	8
Congo	CAF	R1	•	•	R1	•	•	•	•	•	•	•	•	•	R2	•	•	X	•	•	×	×	3
Costa Rica	CONCACAF	R1	•	•	•	•	R1	R1	•	QF	QF	QF	R2	R1	•	•	QF	R1	•	•	R1	Q	12
Croatia	UEFA					•	•	•	•	R1	•	•	•	•	•	R1	QF	•	•	•	R2	Q	5
Cuba	CONCACAF	•	•	R1	R1	•	•	•	•	•	•	•	•	•	•	•	•	•	×	•	•	Q	3
Czech Republic	UEFA	•	•	•	•	QF	•	•	•	•	•	•	•	•	R1	•	•	•	•	•	R2	•	3
Denmark	UEFA	•	•	•	•	•	•	•	•	•	•	•	•	•	R1	•	•	•	•	•	•	Q	2
Dominican Republic	CONCACAF	•	•	•	•	•	•	•	•	•	•	•	•	•	•	•	•	•	•	•	•	Q	1
East Germany	UEFA	•	•	QF	•																		1
Ecuador	CONMEBOL	•	R1	•	•	•	QF	•	•	•	•	•	•	•	R2	•	QF	•	R2	R2	•	Q	7
Egypt	CAF	•	R1	•	•	•	•	QF	•	•	•	•	•	•	•	×	•	•	×	•	R2	Q	4
El Salvador	CONCACAF	•	•	•	•	×	•	•	•	•	•	•	•	•	•	•	•	•	•	•	R1	•	1
England	UEFA	•	•	•	•	•	•	•	•	•	•	•	QF	•	QF	•	R1	1st	•	R2	R3	•	6
Fiji	OFC	•	•	•	•	•	•	•	•	•	•	•	•	×	•	•	•	•	•	•	R1	Q	2
Finland	UEFA	•	•	•	•	•	•	•	•	•	R1	•	•	•	•	•	•	•	•	•	•	•	1
France	UEFA	•	QF	•	•	•	•	•	•	1st	•	•	QF	•	QF	•	R2	R2	3rd	2nd	R3	Q	10
Gambia	CAF	•	•	•	•	•	•	•	•	•	•	R1	•	R1	•	×	X	•	•	×	•	•	2
Germany	UEFA	2nd	•	•	QF	•	R1	4th	R1	•	•	•	3rd	R2	3rd	•	R2	QF	•	1st	R2	•	12
Ghana	CAF	•	•	R1	1st	2nd	1st	2nd	3rd	•	•	R1	4th	•	•	•	X	QF	•	•	•	•	9
Team	Confederation	1985 (China) (16)	1987 (Canada) (16)	1989 (Scotland) (16)	1991 (Italy) (16)	1993 (Japan) (16)	1995 (Ecuador) (16)	1997 (Egypt) (16)	1999 (New Zealand) (16)	2001 (Trinidad and Tobago) (16)	2003 (Finland) (16)	2005 (Peru) (16)	2007 (South Korea) (24)	2009 (Nigeria) (24)	2011 (Mexico) (24)	2013 (United Arab Emirates) (24)	2015 (Chile) (24)	2017 (India) (24)	2019 (Brazil) (24)	2023 (Indonesia) (24)	2025 (Qatar) (48)	2026 (Qatar) (48)	Total
Greece	UEFA	•	•	•	•	•	•	•	•	•	•	•	•	•	•	•	•	•	•	•	•	Q	1
Guinea	CAF	4th	•	R1	•	•	R1	•	•	•	•	•	•	•	•	•	R1	R1	X	×	×	•	5
Haiti	CONCACAF	•	•	•	•	•	•	•	•	•	•	•	R1	•	•	•	•	•	R1	•	R1	Q	4
Honduras	CONCACAF	•	•	•	•	•	•	•	•	•	•	•	R1	R1	•	QF	R1	R2	•	•	R1	Q	7
Hungary	UEFA	QF	•	•	•	•	•	•	•	•	•	•	•	•	•	•	•	•	R1	•	•	•	2
India	AFC	•	•	•	•	•	•	•	•	•	•	•	•	•	•	•	•	R1	•	•	•	•	1
Indonesia	AFC	×	•	•	•	•	×	•	•	•	•	•	•	•	•	•	•	X	•	R1	R1	•	2
Iran	AFC	•	•	•	•	•	•	•	•	R1	•	•	•	R2	•	R2	•	QF	•	R2	•	•	5
Iraq	AFC	•	•	•	•	•	•	•	•	•	•	•	•	•	•	R1	•	R2	•	•	•	•	2
Italy	UEFA	R1	4th	•	R1	R1	•	•	•	•	•	R1	•	QF	•	R2	•	•	QF	•	3rd	Q	10
Ivory Coast	CAF	•	3rd	•	•	•	•	•	•	•	•	R1	•	•	R2	QF	•	•	•	•	R1	Q	6
Jamaica	CONCACAF	•	•	•	•	•	•	•	R1	•	•	•	•	•	R1	•	•	•	•	•	•	Q	3
Japan	AFC	•	•	•	•	QF	R1	•	•	R1	•	•	R1	R1	QF	R2	•	R2	R2	R2	QF	Q	12
Malawi	CAF	•	•	•	•	•	•	•	•	•	•	•	•	R1	•	•	×	×	•	•	•	•	1
Mali	CAF	•	•	•	•	•	•	QF	R1	QF	•	•	•	•	•	•	2nd	4th	•	3rd	R3	Q	8
Mexico	CONCACAF	R1	R1	•	R1	R1	•	R1	QF	•	QF	1st	•	R2	1st	2nd	4th	R2	2nd	R2	R3	Q	17
Montenegro	UEFA													•	•	•	•	•	•	•	•	Q	1
Morocco	CAF	•	•	•	•	•	•	•	•	•	•	•	•	•	•	R2	•	•	•	QF	QF	Q	4
Mozambique	CAF	•	•	•	•	•	•	•	•	•	•	•	•	•	•	•	•	•	•	•	•	Q	1
Netherlands	UEFA	•	•	•	•	•	•	•	•	•	•	3rd	•	R1	R1	•	•	•	4th	•	•	•	4
New Caledonia	OFC	•	×	•	×	•	•	•	•	×	•	•	•	•	•	•	•	R1	•	R1	R1	Q	4
New Zealand	OFC	•	•	•	•	•	•	R1	R1	•	•	×	R1	R2	R2	R1	R2	R1	R1	R1	R1	Q	12
Niger	CAF	•	•	•	•	•	•	•	•	•	•	•	•	•	•	•	•	R2	•	•	•	•	1
Nigeria	CAF	1st	2nd	QF	•	1st	QF	•	•	2nd	R1	•	1st	2nd	•	1st	1st	•	R2	•	•	•	12
North Korea	AFC	•	•	•	•	•	•	•	•	•	•	QF	R2	•	R1	•	R2	R1	•	×	R3	×	6
Oman	AFC	•	•	•	•	•	4th	QF	•	R1	•	•	•	•	•	•	•	•	•	•	•	•	3
Panama	CONCACAF	•	•	•	•	•	•	•	•	•	•	•	•	•	R2	R1	•	•	•	R1	R1	Q	5
Paraguay	CONMEBOL	•	•	•	•	•	•	•	QF	R1	•	•	•	•	•	•	R1	R2	QF	•	R2	•	6
Peru	CONMEBOL	•	•	•	•	•	•	•	•	•	•	R1	QF	•	•	•	•	•	•	•	•	•	2
Poland	UEFA	•	•	•	•	4th	•	•	R1	•	•	•	•	•	•	•	•	•	•	R1	•	•	3
Portugal	UEFA	•	•	3rd	•	•	QF	•	•	•	QF	•	•	•	•	•	•	•	•	•	1st	•	4
Qatar	AFC	R1	QF	•	4th	R1	R1	•	QF	•	•	R1	•	•	•	•	•	•	•	•	R1	Q	9
Republic of Ireland	UEFA	×	•	•	•	•	•	•	•	•	•	•	•	•	•	•	•	•	•	•	R3	Q	2
Team	Confederation	1985 (China) (16)	1987 (Canada) (16)	1989 (Scotland) (16)	1991 (Italy) (16)	1993 (Japan) (16)	1995 (Ecuador) (16)	1997 (Egypt) (16)	1999 (New Zealand) (16)	2001 (Trinidad and Tobago) (16)	2003 (Finland) (16)	2005 (Peru) (16)	2007 (South Korea) (24)	2009 (Nigeria) (24)	2011 (Mexico) (24)	2013 (United Arab Emirates) (24)	2015 (Chile) (24)	2017 (India) (24)	2019 (Brazil) (24)	2023 (Indonesia) (24)	2025 (Qatar) (48)	2026 (Qatar) (48)	Total
Romania	UEFA	•	•	•	•	•	•	•	•	•	•	•	•	•	•	•	•	•	•	•	•	Q	1
Russia	UEFA	•	1st	•	•	•	•	•	•	•	•	•	•	•	•	R2	R2	•	•	X	X	X	3
Rwanda	CAF	•	•	•	•	•	•	•	•	•	•	•	•	•	R1	•	•	•	•	×	×	•	1
Saudi Arabia	AFC	QF	R1	1st	•	•	•	•	•	•	•	•	•	•	•	•	•	•	•	•	R1	Q	5
Scotland	UEFA	•	•	2nd	•	•	•	•	•	•	•	•	•	•	•	•	•	•	•	•	•	•	1
Senegal	CAF	•	•	•	•	•	•	•	•	•	•	•	•	•	•	•	•	•	R2	R2	R2	Q	4
Serbia	UEFA												•	•	•	•	•	•	•	•	•	Q	1
Sierra Leone	CAF	•	•	•	•	•	•	•	•	•	R1	•	•	•	•	×	×	×	•	•	•	•	1
Slovakia	UEFA	•	•	•	•	•	•	•	•	•	•	•	•	•	•	R2	•	•	•	•	•	•	1
Solomon Islands	OFC	×	×	•	×	•	•	•	•	•	•	•	×	×	•	×	•	•	R1	X	•	•	1
South Africa	CAF	•	•	•	•	•	•	•	•	•	•	•	•	•	•	•	R1	•	•	•	R2	•	2
South Korea	AFC	•	QF	•	•	•	•	•	•	•	R1	•	R1	QF	•	•	R2	•	QF	R1	R2	Q	9
Spain	UEFA	•	•	•	2nd	•	R1	3rd	R1	R1	2nd	•	2nd	3rd	•	•	•	2nd	QF	QF	•	Q	12
Sudan	CAF	•	•	•	R1	•	•	•	•	•	•	•	•	•	•	×	•	•	•	X	•	•	1
Sweden	UEFA	•	•	•	•	•	•	•	•	•	•	•	•	•	•	3rd	•	•	•	•	•	•	1
Switzerland	UEFA	•	•	•	•	•	•	•	•	•	•	•	•	1st	•	•	•	•	•	•	QF	•	2
Syria	AFC	•	•	•	•	•	•	•	•	•	•	•	R2	•	•	•	R1	•	•	•	•	•	2
Tajikistan	AFC					•	•	•	•	•	•	•	R2	•	•	•	•	•	R1	•	R1	Q	4
Tanzania	CAF	•	•	•	×	•	•	•	•	•	•	•	•	•	•	•	•	•	•	•	•	Q	1
Thailand	AFC	•	•	•	•	•	•	R1	R1	•	•	•	•	•	•	•	•	•	•	•	•	•	2
Togo	CAF	•	•	•	•	•	•	•	•	•	•	•	R1	•	•	•	•	•	•	•	•	•	1
Trinidad and Tobago	CONCACAF	•	•	•	•	•	•	•	•	R1	•	•	R1	•	•	•	•	•	•	•	•	•	2
Tunisia	CAF	•	•	•	•	R1	•	•	•	•	•	•	R2	•	•	R2	•	•	•	•	R2	•	4
Turkey	UEFA	•	•	•	•	•	•	•	•	•	•	4th	•	QF	•	•	•	R1	•	•	•	•	3
Uganda	CAF	×	×	×	•	×	×	×	×	×	×	×	×	×	X	×	•	×	•	•	R3	Q	2
United Arab Emirates	AFC	•	•	•	R1	•	•	•	•	•	•	•	•	R2	•	R1	•	•	×	•	R1	•	4
United States	CONCACAF	R1	R1	R1	QF	QF	R1	R1	4th	R1	QF	QF	R2	R2	R2	•	R1	QF	R1	R2	R2	×	20
Uruguay	CONMEBOL	•	•	•	R1	•	•	•	QF	•	•	R1	•	QF	2nd	QF	•	•	•	•	•	Q	7
Uzbekistan	AFC					•	•	•	•	•	•	•	•	•	QF	R2	•	•	•	QF	R2	Q	5
Venezuela	CONMEBOL	•	•	•	•	•	•	•	•	•	•	•	•	•	•	R1	•	•	•	R2	R2	Q	4
Vietnam	AFC	×	×	×	×	×	×	×	×	•	•	•	•	•	•	•	•	•	•	•	•	Q	1
Yemen	AFC	•	•	•	•	•	•	•	•	•	R1	•	•	•	•	•	•	•	•	•	•	•	1
Zambia	CAF	•	×	•	•	×	X	•	•	•	•	•	•	•	•	•	•	•	•	•	R2	•	1
Team	Confederation	1985 (China) (16)	1987 (Canada) (16)	1989 (Scotland) (16)	1991 (Italy) (16)	1993 (Japan) (16)	1995 (Ecuador) (16)	1997 (Egypt) (16)	1999 (New Zealand) (16)	2001 (Trinidad and Tobago) (16)	2003 (Finland) (16)	2005 (Peru) (16)	2007 (South Korea) (24)	2009 (Nigeria) (24)	2011 (Mexico) (24)	2013 (United Arab Emirates) (24)	2015 (Chile) (24)	2017 (India) (24)	2019 (Brazil) (24)	2023 (Indonesia) (24)	2025 (Qatar) (48)	2026 (Qatar) (48)	Total

== Results of defending champions ==
Year	Defending champions	Finish
1987	Nigeria	Runners-up
1989	Soviet Union	Did not qualify
1991	Saudi Arabia	Did not qualify
1993	Ghana	Runners-up
1995	Nigeria	Quarter-finals
1997	Ghana	Runners-up
1999	Brazil	Champions
2001	Brazil	Quarter-finals
2003	France	Did not qualify
2005	Brazil	Runners-up
2007	Mexico	Did not qualify
2009	Nigeria	Runners-up
2011	Switzerland	Did not qualify
2013	Mexico	Runners-up
2015	Nigeria	Champions
2017	Nigeria	Did not qualify
2019	England	Did not qualify
2023	Brazil	Quarter-finals
2025	Germany	Round of 32
2026	Portugal	Did not qualify

== Results of host nations ==
Year	Host nation	Finish
1985	China	Quarter-finals
1987	Canada	Group stage
1989	Scotland	Runners-up
1991	Italy	Group stage
1993	Japan	Quarter-finals
1995	Ecuador	Quarter-finals
1997	Egypt	Quarter-finals
1999	New Zealand	Group stage
2001	Trinidad and Tobago	Group stage
2003	Finland	Group stage
2005	Peru	Group stage
2007	South Korea	Group stage
2009	Nigeria	Runners-up
2011	Mexico	Champions
2013	United Arab Emirates	Group stage
2015	Chile	Round of 16
2017	India	Group stage
2019	Brazil	Champions
2023	Indonesia	Group stage
2025	Qatar	Group stage
2026	Qatar	Qualified

== Results by confederation ==
— Hosting confederation

=== Overview ===
Confederation	1st	2nd	3rd	4th	Top 8	Top 16	Top 32
CAF	7	6	4	3	30	26	9
UEFA	6	8	10	5	47	40	11
CONMEBOL	4	3	6	7	37	30	5
CONCACAF	2	2	0	2	18	18	3
AFC	1	0	0	3	20	27	4
OFC	0	1	0	0	6	3	0

=== AFC ===
	1985 (China) (16)	1987 (Canada) (16)	1989 (Scotland) (16)	1991 (Italy) (16)	1993 (Japan) (16)	1995 (Ecuador) (16)	1997 (Egypt) (16)	1999 (New Zealand) (16)	2001 (Trinidad and Tobago) (16)	2003 (Finland) (16)	2005 (Peru) (16)	2007 (South Korea) (24)	2009 (Nigeria) (24)	2011 (Mexico) (24)	2013 (United Arab Emirates) (24)	2015 (Chile) (24)	2017 (India) (24)	2019 (Brazil) (24)	2023 (Indonesia) (24)	2025 (Qatar) (48)	Total
Teams	3	3	3	3	3	3	3	2	3	3	3	5	4	4	5	4	5	4	5	9	77
Top 32	—	—	—	—	—	—	—	—	—	—	—	—	—	—	—	—	—	—	—	4	4
Top 16	—	—	—	—	—	—	—	—	—	—	—	3	3	3	3	3	3	3	3	3	27
Top 8	2	2	2	1	1	1	1	1	0	0	2	0	1	2	0	0	1	1	1	1	20
Top 4	0	0	2	1	0	1	0	0	0	0	0	0	0	0	0	0	0	0	0	0	4
Top 2	0	0	1	0	0	0	0	0	0	0	0	0	0	0	0	0	0	0	0	0	1
1st			(Saudi Arabia)																		1
2nd																					0
3rd																					0
4th			(Bahrain)	(Qatar)		(Oman)															3

=== CAF ===
	1985 (China) (16)	1987 (Canada) (16)	1989 (Scotland) (16)	1991 (Italy) (16)	1993 (Japan) (16)	1995 (Ecuador) (16)	1997 (Egypt) (16)	1999 (New Zealand) (16)	2001 (Trinidad and Tobago) (16)	2003 (Finland) (16)	2005 (Peru) (16)	2007 (South Korea) (24)	2009 (Nigeria) (24)	2011 (Mexico) (24)	2013 (United Arab Emirates) (24)	2015 (Chile) (24)	2017 (India) (24)	2019 (Brazil) (24)	2023 (Indonesia) (24)	2025 (Qatar) (48)	Total
Teams	3	3	3	3	3	3	3	3	3	3	3	4	5	4	4	4	4	4	4	10	76
Top 32	—	—	—	—	—	—	—	—	—	—	—	—	—	—	—	—	—	—	—	9	9
Top 16	—	—	—	—	—	—	—	—	—	—	—	3	2	2	4	2	3	3	3	4	26
Top 8	2	2	1	1	2	2	3	1	3	0	0	2	1	0	2	2	2	0	2	2	30
Top 4	2	2	0	1	2	1	1	1	2	0	0	2	1	0	1	2	1	0	1	0	20
Top 2	1	1	0	1	2	1	1	0	1	0	0	1	1	0	1	2	0	0	0	0	13
1st	(Nigeria)			(Ghana)	(Nigeria)	(Ghana)						(Nigeria)			(Nigeria)	(Nigeria)					7
2nd		(Nigeria)			(Ghana)		(Ghana)		(Nigeria)				(Nigeria)			(Mali)					6
3rd		(Ivory Coast)						(Ghana)	(Burkina Faso)										(Mali)		4
4th	(Guinea)											(Ghana)					(Mali)				3

=== CONCACAF ===
	1985 (China) (16)	1987 (Canada) (16)	1989 (Scotland) (16)	1991 (Italy) (16)	1993 (Japan) (16)	1995 (Ecuador) (16)	1997 (Egypt) (16)	1999 (New Zealand) (16)	2001 (Trinidad and Tobago) (16)	2003 (Finland) (16)	2005 (Peru) (16)	2007 (South Korea) (24)	2009 (Nigeria) (24)	2011 (Mexico) (24)	2013 (United Arab Emirates) (24)	2015 (Chile) (24)	2017 (India) (24)	2019 (Brazil) (24)	2023 (Indonesia) (24)	2025 (Qatar) (48)	Total
Teams	3	3	3	3	3	3	3	3	3	3	3	5	4	5	4	4	4	4	4	8	75
Top 32	—	—	—	—	—	—	—	—	—	—	—	—	—	—	—	—	—	—	—	3	3
Top 16	—	—	—	—	—	—	—	—	—	—	—	2	2	3	2	2	3	1	2	1	18
Top 8	0	0	0	1	1	0	0	2	1	3	3	0	0	1	2	2	1	1	0	0	18
Top 4	0	0	0	0	0	0	0	1	0	0	1	0	0	1	1	1	0	1	0	0	6
Top 2	0	0	0	0	0	0	0	0	0	0	1	0	0	1	1	0	0	1	0	0	4
1st											(Mexico)			(Mexico)							2
2nd															(Mexico)			(Mexico)			2
3rd																					0
4th								(United States)								(Mexico)					2

=== CONMEBOL ===
	1985 (China) (16)	1987 (Canada) (16)	1989 (Scotland) (16)	1991 (Italy) (16)	1993 (Japan) (16)	1995 (Ecuador) (16)	1997 (Egypt) (16)	1999 (New Zealand) (16)	2001 (Trinidad and Tobago) (16)	2003 (Finland) (16)	2005 (Peru) (16)	2007 (South Korea) (24)	2009 (Nigeria) (24)	2011 (Mexico) (24)	2013 (United Arab Emirates) (24)	2015 (Chile) (24)	2017 (India) (24)	2019 (Brazil) (24)	2023 (Indonesia) (24)	2025 (Qatar) (48)	Total
Teams	3	3	3	3	3	3	3	3	3	3	4	4	4	4	4	5	4	5	4	7	75
Top 32	—	—	—	—	—	—	—	—	—	—	—	—	—	—	—	—	—	—	—	5	5
Top 16	—	—	—	—	—	—	—	—	—	—	—	4	3	4	3	3	3	5	4	1	30
Top 8	1	0	2	2	1	3	2	3	2	3	1	2	2	2	3	2	1	2	2	1	37
Top 4	1	0	0	1	1	2	1	1	1	3	1	0	1	2	1	0	1	1	1	1	20
Top 2	0	0	0	0	0	1	1	1	0	1	1	0	0	1	0	0	0	1	0	0	7
1st							(Brazil)	(Brazil)		(Brazil)								(Brazil)			4
2nd						(Brazil)					(Brazil)			(Uruguay)							3
3rd	(Brazil)			(Argentina)	(Chile)	(Argentina)				(Argentina)							(Brazil)				6
4th									(Argentina)	(Colombia)			(Colombia)	(Brazil)	(Argentina)				(Argentina)	(Brazil)	7

=== OFC ===
	1985 (China) (16)	1987 (Canada) (16)	1989 (Scotland) (16)	1991 (Italy) (16)	1993 (Japan) (16)	1995 (Ecuador) (16)	1997 (Egypt) (16)	1999 (New Zealand) (16)	2001 (Trinidad and Tobago) (16)	2003 (Finland) (16)	2005 (Peru) (16)	2007 (South Korea) (24)	2009 (Nigeria) (24)	2011 (Mexico) (24)	2013 (United Arab Emirates) (24)	2015 (Chile) (24)	2017 (India) (24)	2019 (Brazil) (24)	2023 (Indonesia) (24)	2025 (Qatar) (48)	Total
Teams	1	1	1	1	1	1	1	2	1	1	1	1	1	1	1	1	2	2	2	3	26
Top 32	—	—	—	—	—	—	—	—	—	—	—	—	—	—	—	—	—	—	—	0	0
Top 16	—	—	—	—	—	—	—	—	—	—	—	0	1	1	0	1	0	0	0	0	3
Top 8	1	1	0	1	0	1	0	1	1	0	0	0	0	0	0	0	0	0	0	0	6
Top 4	0	0	0	0	0	0	0	1	0	0	0	0	0	0	0	0	0	0	0	0	1
Top 2	0	0	0	0	0	0	0	1	0	0	0	0	0	0	0	0	0	0	0	0	1
1st																					0
2nd								(Australia)													1
3rd																					0
4th																					0

=== UEFA ===
	1985 (China) (16)	1987 (Canada) (16)	1989 (Scotland) (16)	1991 (Italy) (16)	1993 (Japan) (16)	1995 (Ecuador) (16)	1997 (Egypt) (16)	1999 (New Zealand) (16)	2001 (Trinidad and Tobago) (16)	2003 (Finland) (16)	2005 (Peru) (16)	2007 (South Korea) (24)	2009 (Nigeria) (24)	2011 (Mexico) (24)	2013 (United Arab Emirates) (24)	2015 (Chile) (24)	2017 (India) (24)	2019 (Brazil) (24)	2023 (Indonesia) (24)	2025 (Qatar) (48)	Total
Teams	3	3	3	3	3	3	3	3	3	3	3	5	6	6	6	6	5	5	5	11	88
Top 32	—	—	—	—	—	—	—	—	—	—	—	—	—	—	—	—	—	—	—	11	11
Top 16	—	—	—	—	—	—	—	—	—	—	—	4	5	3	4	5	4	4	4	7	40
Top 8	2	3	3	2	1	1	2	0	1	2	2	4	4	3	1	2	3	4	3	4	47
Top 4	1	2	2	1	1	0	2	0	1	1	2	2	2	1	1	1	2	2	2	3	29
Top 2	1	1	1	1	0	0	0	0	1	1	0	1	1	0	0	0	2	0	2	2	14
1st		(Soviet Union)							(France)				(Switzerland)				(England)		(Germany)	(Portugal)	6
2nd	(West Germany)		(Scotland)	(Spain)						(Spain)		(Spain)					(Spain)		(France)	(Austria)	8
3rd			(Portugal)				(Spain)				(Netherlands)	(Germany)	(Spain)	(Germany)	(Sweden)	(Belgium)		(France)		(Italy)	10
4th		(Italy)			(Poland)		(Germany)				(Turkey)							(Netherlands)			5

== Awards ==
Tournament	Golden Ball	Golden Boot	Goals	Golden Glove	Fair Play Award
1985 China	(Brazil) William	(West Germany) Marcel Witeczek	8	Not awarded	West Germany
1987 Canada	(Nigeria) Philip Osondu	(Ivory Coast) Moussa Traoré	5	Not awarded	Soviet Union
1989 Scotland	(Scotland) James Will	(Guinea) Fode Camara	3	Not awarded	Bahrain
1991 Italy	(Ghana) Nii Lamptey	(Brazil) Adriano	4	Not awarded	Argentina
1993 Japan	(Ghana) Daniel Addo	(Nigeria) Wilson Oruma	6	Not awarded	Nigeria
1995 Ecuador	(Oman) Mohamed Kathiri	(Australia) Daniel Allsopp	5	Not awarded	Brazil
1997 Egypt	(Spain) Sergio Santamaría	(Spain) David	7	Not awarded	Argentina
1999 New Zealand	(United States) Landon Donovan	(Ghana) Ishmael Addo	7	Not awarded	Mexico
2001 Trinidad and Tobago	(France) Florent Sinama Pongolle	(France) Florent Sinama Pongolle	9	Not awarded	Nigeria
2003 Finland	(Spain) Cesc Fàbregas	(Spain) Cesc Fàbregas	5	Not awarded	Costa Rica
2005 Peru	(Brazil) Anderson	(Mexico) Carlos Vela	5	Not awarded	North Korea
2007 South Korea	(Germany) Toni Kroos	(Nigeria) Macauley Chrisantus	7	Not awarded	Costa Rica
2009 Nigeria	(Nigeria) Sani Emmanuel	(Spain) Borja	5	(Switzerland) Benjamin Siegrist	Nigeria
2011 Mexico	(Mexico) Julio Gómez	(Ivory Coast) Souleymane Coulibaly	9	(Uruguay) Jonathan Cubero	Japan
2013 United Arab Emirates	(Nigeria) Kelechi Iheanacho	(Sweden) Valmir Berisha	7	(Nigeria) Dele Alampasu	Nigeria
2015 Chile	(Nigeria) Kelechi Nwakali	(Nigeria) Victor Osimhen	10	(Mali) Samuel Diarra	Ecuador
2017 India	(England) Phil Foden	(England) Rhian Brewster	8	(Brazil) Gabriel Brazão	Brazil
2019 Brazil	(Brazil) Gabriel Veron	(Netherlands) Sontje Hansen	6	(Brazil) Matheus Donelli	Ecuador
2023 Indonesia	(Germany) Paris Brunner	(Argentina) Agustín Ruberto	8	(France) Paul Argney	England
2025 Qatar	(Portugal) Mateus Mide	(Austria) Johannes Moser	8	(Portugal) Romário Cunha	Czech Republic

== Team: tournament position ==
Most championships
5; Nigeria (1985, 1993, 2007, 2013, 2015)
Most finishes in the top two
8; Nigeria (1985, 1987, 1993, 2001, 2007, 2009, 2013, 2015)
Most finishes in the top three
8; Nigeria (1985, 1987, 1993, 2001, 2007, 2009, 2013, 2015), Brazil (1985, 1995, 1997, 1999, 2003, 2005, 2017, 2019)
Most World Cup appearances
20; Brazil (every tournament except 1993) and United States (every tournament except 2013)
Most second-place finishes
4; Spain (1991, 2003, 2007, 2017)
Most third-place finishes
3; Argentina (1991, 1995, 2003)
Most fourth-place finishes
3; Argentina (2001, 2013, 2023)
Most third–fourth-place finishes
6; Argentina (1991, 1995, 2001, 2003, 2013, 2023)

=== Consecutive ===
Most consecutive championships
2; Brazil (1997–1999), Nigeria (2013–2015)
Most consecutive finishes in the top two
4; Ghana (1991–1997)
Most consecutive finishes in the top three
5; Ghana (1991–1999)
Most consecutive finishes in the top four
5; Ghana (1991–1999)
Most consecutive finals tournaments
15; Brazil (1995–2025)
Most consecutive second-place finishes
no country has finished second in two consecutive tournaments
Most consecutive third-place finishes
no country has finished third in two consecutive tournaments
Most consecutive fourth-place finishes
no country has finished fourth in two consecutive tournaments
Most consecutive third–fourth-place finishes
2; Argentina (2001–2003)

=== Gaps ===
Longest gap between successive titles
16 years; Brazil (2003–2019)
Longest gap between successive appearances in the top two
14 years; Brazil (2005–2019)
Longest gap between successive appearances in the top three
36 years; Portugal (1989–2025)
Longest gap between successive appearances in the top four
38 years; Italy (1987–2025)
Longest gap between successive appearances in the finals
38 years; Bolivia (1987–2025)

=== Host team ===
Best finish by a host team
Champions; Mexico (2011), Brazil (2019)
Worst finish by a host team
Group stage; Canada (1987), Italy (1991), New Zealand (1999), Trinidad and Tobago (2001), Finland (2003), Peru (2005), South Korea (2007), United Arab Emirates (2013), India (2017), Indonesia (2023), Qatar (2025)

=== Defending champions ===
Best finish by defending champions
Champions; Brazil (1999), Nigeria (2015)
Worst finish by defending champions
Did not qualify; Soviet Union (1989), Saudi Arabia (1991), France (2003), Mexico (2007), Switzerland (2011), Nigeria (2017), England (2019), Portugal (2025)
Worst finish by defending champions who participate in the next tournament
Round of 32; Germany (2025)

=== Debuting teams ===
Best finish by a debuting team
Champions; Nigeria (1985), Soviet Union (1987), Switzerland (2009)

=== Other ===
Most finishes in the top two, never become champions
4; Spain (1991, 2003, 2007, 2017)
Most finishes in the top four, never become champions
6; Spain (1991, 1997, 2003, 2007, 2009, 2017)
Most appearances, never become champions
19; United States (all except 2013)
Most finishes in the top four, never finish in the top two
6; Argentina (1991, 1995, 2001, 2003, 2013, 2023)
Most appearances, never finish in the top two
19; United States (all except 2013)
Most appearances, never finish in the top four
11; Costa Rica (1985, 1995, 1997, 2001, 2003, 2005, 2007, 2009, 2015, 2017, 2025)

=== All time ===
Most appearances in the group stage
20; Brazil (every tournament except 1993)
Most progression from the group stage
17; Brazil (every tournament except 1987 and 2009)
Most consecutive appearances, progressing from the group stage
7; Brazil (1995–2007)
Most appearances, never progressing from the group stage
8; Canada (1987, 1989, 1993, 1995, 2011, 2013, 2023)

== Teams: matches played and goals scored ==
=== All time ===
Most matches played
102; Brazil
Fewest matches played
3; Sudan, Finland, Togo, Sierra Leone, Rwanda, Yemen, Denmark, Algeria, Malawi, India, Solomon Islands, El Salvador, Fiji
Most wins
66; Brazil
Most losses
36; United States
Most draws
16; Argentina, Brazil
Most goals scored
230; Brazil
Most goals conceded
120; United States
Fewest goals scored
0; Rwanda, Algeria, Solomon Islands, El Salvador, Fiji
Fewest goals conceded
3; Scotland, Togo, Rwanda
Highest goal difference
+139; Brazil
Lowest goal difference
–88; New Zealand
Most played final
2 times; Brazil v Ghana (1995, 1997), Brazil v Mexico (2005, 2019)

=== In one tournament ===
Most goals scored
26; Nigeria (2013)
Most goals scored, champions
26; Nigeria (2013)
Most goals scored, hosts
19; Brazil (2019)
Fewest goals scored, champions
8; Saudi Arabia (1989), Ghana (1991), Brazil (1999)

== Goalscoring ==
=== Individual ===
Most goals scored in a tournament
10; Victor Osimhen (Nigeria) (2015)
Most goals scored in a match
4; David (Spain, vs New Zealand) (1997), Carlos Hidalgo (Colombia, vs Finland) (2003), Souleymane Coulibaly (Ivory Coast, vs Denmark) (2011), Kelechi Iheanacho (Nigeria, vs Mexico) (2013)
Most goals scored in a final
2; Phil Foden (England), Sergio Gomez (Spain) (2017)
Fastest goal in a final
3rd minute; Wilson Oruma (Nigeria, vs Ghana) (1993)
Latest goal from kickoff in a final
90+3rd minute; Lázaro (Brazil, vs Mexico) (2019)

=== Team ===
Biggest margin of victory
16; Morocco, vs New Caledonia (2025)
Most goals scored in a match, one team
16; Morocco, vs New Caledonia (2025)
Most goals scored in a match, both teams
16; Morocco 16–0 New Caledonia (2025)
Most goals scored in a final, one team
5; England (2017)
Most goals scored in a final, both teams
7; England 5–2 Spain (2017)
Fewest goals scored in a final, both teams
0; Brazil 0–0 Australia (1999), Nigeria 0–0 Spain (2007)
Biggest margin of victory in a final
3; France (2001), Mexico (2005), Nigeria (2013), England (2017)
Most goals in a tournament, one team
26; Nigeria (2013)

=== Tournament ===
Most goals scored in a tournament
325 goals, 2025
Fewest goals scored in a tournament
77 goals, 1989
Most goals per match in a tournament
3.52 goals per match, 2017
Fewest goals per match in a tournament
2.4 goals per match, 1989

=== Top scoring teams by tournament ===
Teams listed in bold won the tournament.

World Cup	Team	Goals
1985 China	Brazil; West Germany	13
1987 Canada	**Soviet Union**	17
1989 Scotland	Portugal	11
1991 Italy	Spain	13
1993 Japan	**Nigeria**	20
1995 Ecuador	**Ghana**; Brazil	13
1997 Egypt	Spain	22
1999 New Zealand	Ghana	19
2001 Trinidad and Tobago	**France**	18
2003 Finland	Spain	16
2005 Peru	**Mexico**; Brazil	16
2007 South Korea	Germany	20
2009 Nigeria	**Switzerland**; Spain	18
2011 Mexico	Germany	24
2013 United Arab Emirates	**Nigeria**	26
2015 Chile	**Nigeria**	23
2017 India	**England**	23
2019 Brazil	France	22
2023 Indonesia	Argentina	19
2025 Qatar	**Portugal**	23

== Host records ==
Best performance by host(s)
Champions; Mexico (2011), Brazil (2019)
Worst performance by host(s)
Group stage; Canada (1987), Italy (1991), New Zealand (1999), Trinidad and Tobago (2001), Finland (2003), Peru (2005), South Korea (2007), United Arab Emirates (2013), India (2017), Indonesia (2023), Qatar (2025)
Had its best performance when hosting

- Champions: Mexico (2011), Brazil (2019)
- Runners-up: Scotland (1989)
- Semi-finals: none
- Quarter-finals: China (1985), Ecuador (1995), Egypt (1997)
- Round of 16: none
- Round of 32: none
- Group stage: Canada (1987), Trinidad and Tobago (2001), Finland (2003), India (2017), Indonesia (2023)

== Penalty shoot-outs ==
As of 27 November 2025
Most shoot-outs, team, all-time
8; Brazil
Most wins, team, all-time
4; Brazil
Most losses, team, all-time
4; Brazil, France
Most shoot-outs with 100% record (all won)
3; Germany
Most shoot-outs with 0% record (all lost)
3; United States

=== Most wins, penalty shoot-out ===
Team	Won	Lost	Total
Brazil	4	4	8
Germany	3	0	3
Mexico	3	1	4
England	2	0	2
Morocco	2	0	2
Saudi Arabia	2	0	2
Spain	2	1	3
Nigeria	2	2	4
Argentina	2	3	5
Bahrain	1	0	1
Burkina Faso	1	0	1
Chile	1	0	1
Costa Rica	1	0	1
Italy	1	0	1
Peru	1	0	1
Portugal	1	0	1
Republic of Ireland	1	0	1
Russia	1	0	1
South Korea	1	0	1
Uzbekistan	1	0	1
Colombia	1	1	2
Guinea	1	1	2
Japan	1	1	2
Australia	1	2	3
Qatar	1	2	3
France	1	4	5
Canada	0	1	1
Croatia	0	1	1
Iran	0	1	1
Mali	0	1	1
Netherlands	0	1	1
North Korea	0	1	1
Paraguay	0	1	1
Poland	0	1	1
Scotland	0	1	1
Senegal	0	1	1
Tajikistan	0	1	1
Turkey	0	1	1
Uganda	0	1	1
Uruguay	0	1	1
United States	0	3	3
Total	39	39	78

== See also ==
- FIFA U-20 World Cup records and statistics
