= 1995 South American U-17 Championship =

Campeonato Sudamericano Sub-17 Perú 1995

Tournament details
- Host country: Peru
- Cities: Lima and Trujillo
- Dates: 5–21 May
- Teams: 9 (from 1 confederation)
- Venues: 2 (in 2 host cities)

Final positions
- Champions: Brazil (3rd title)
- Runners-up: Argentina
- Third place: Uruguay
- Fourth place: Chile

Tournament statistics
- Matches played: 22
- Goals scored: 77 (3.5 per match)
- Top scorer(s): (Brazil) Marco Antônio (10 goals)

The 1995 South American U-17 Championship (Spanish: Campeonato Sudamericano Sub-17 Perú 1995, Brazilian Portuguese: Campeonato Sul-Americano Sub-17 Peru 1995) was the sixth edition of the South American U-17 Championship, the biennial international youth football championship organised by CONMEBOL for the men's under-17 national teams of South America. It was held in Peru from 5 to 21 May 1995.

The two best teams, champions Brazil, which won their third title, and vice-champions Argentina qualified for the 1995 FIFA U-17 World Championship in Ecuador whose U-17 team has also qualified.

== Teams ==
Nine CONMEBOL teams are taking part in the tournament, with the exception of Ecuador—the host nation for the U-17 World Cup—whose team has qualified automatically.

Team	Appearance	Previous best performance
Argentina	6th	Champions (1 time, 1985)
Bolivia	6th	Champions (1 time, 1986)
Brazil	6th	Champions (2 times, 1988, 1991)
Chile	6th	Runners-up (1 time, 1993)
Colombia (holders)	6th	Champions (1 time, 1993)
Paraguay	5th	Fourth place (1 time, 1988)
Peru (hosts)	6th	
Uruguay	6th	Runners-up (1 time, 1991)
Venezuela	6th	

== Venues ==
Lima	Trujillo
Estadio Nacional	Estadio Mansiche
Capacity: 45,000	Capacity: 25,000
1995 South American U-17 Championship is located in Peru

== First stage ==
The top two teams in each group advance to the final stage.

=== Group A ===
Pos	Team	Pld	W	D	L	GF	GA	GD	Pts	Qualification
1	Argentina	3	3	0	0	9	2	+7	9	Final stage
2	Uruguay	3	2	0	1	9	3	+6	6	Final stage
3	Peru (H)	3	0	1	2	4	7	−3	1	
4	Venezuela	3	0	1	2	4	14	−10	1	

Source: RSSSF
(H) Hosts
5 May 1995

Argentina	2–1	Uruguay
	Report	Biscayzacú

Estadio Nacional, Lima
5 May 1995

Peru	3–3	Venezuela
Téllez 14', 28' Sara-Lafosse 24'		Pérez 44' (pen.) Urbina 85' Muinos 90'

Estadio Nacional, Lima

9 May 1995

Argentina	5–0	Venezuela
Duscher 15' Peralta 35' La Paglia 55', 65' Gatti 75'

Estadio Nacional, Lima
9 May 1995

Peru	0–2	Uruguay
	Report	Biscayzacú Pellegrín

Estadio Nacional, Lima

13 May 1995

Uruguay	6–1	Venezuela
Biscayzacú 1', 26', 89' Regueiro 6', 52' Sarkissian 48'	Report	Páez 84'

Estadio Nacional, Lima
13 May 1995

Peru	1–2	Argentina
Sara-Lafosse	Report	Gatti Ávila (pen.)

Estadio Nacional, Lima

=== Group B ===
Pos	Team	Pld	W	D	L	GF	GA	GD	Pts	Qualification
1	Brazil	4	3	1	0	7	3	+4	10	Final stage
2	Chile	4	1	2	1	7	8	−1	5	Final stage
3	Colombia	4	1	1	2	6	6	0	4	
4	Paraguay	4	1	1	2	6	6	0	4	
5	Bolivia	4	1	1	2	2	5	−3	4	

Source: RSSSF
6 May 1995

Chile	2–4	Paraguay

Estadio Mansiche, Trujillo
6 May 1995

Colombia	1–2	Brazil

Estadio Mansiche, Trujillo

8 May 1995

Chile	1–1	Bolivia

Estadio Mansiche, Trujillo

Colombia	1–1	Paraguay

Estadio Mansiche, Trujillo

10 May 1995

Brazil	2–1	Paraguay

Estadio Mansiche, Trujillo

Colombia	2–0	Bolivia

Estadio Mansiche, Trujillo

12 May 1995

Brazil	2–0	Bolivia

Estadio Mansiche, Trujillo
12 May 1995

Colombia	2–3	Chile

Estadio Mansiche, Trujillo

14 May 1995

Brazil	1–1	Chile

Estadio Mansiche, Trujillo

Paraguay	0–1	Bolivia

Estadio Mansiche, Trujillo

== Final stage ==
Pos	Team	Pld	W	D	L	GF	GA	GD	Pts	Qualification
1	Brazil (C)	3	3	0	0	12	1	+11	9	1995 FIFA U-17 World Championship
2	Argentina	3	1	1	1	3	2	+1	4	1995 FIFA U-17 World Championship
3	Uruguay	3	0	2	1	4	5	−1	2	
4	Chile	3	0	1	2	4	15	−11	1	

Source: RSSSF
(C) Champions
16 May 1995

Brazil	1–0	Uruguay

Estadio Nacional, Lima
16 May 1995

Argentina	2–0	Chile

Estadio Nacional, Lima

19 May 1995

Brazil	10–1	Chile
		Contreras

Estadio Nacional, Lima
19 May 1995

Argentina	1–1	Uruguay
	Report	Denegri

Estadio Nacional, Lima

21 May 1995

Uruguay	3–3	Chile
Morales Regueiro Biscayzacú	Report

Estadio Nacional, Lima
21 May 1995

Brazil	1–0	Argentina
Marco Antônio

Estadio Nacional, Lima

== Winners ==
1995 South American U-17 Football champions

Brazil
Third title

== Goalscorers ==
There were 77 goals scored in 22 matches, for an average of 3.5 goals per match.

10 goals

- (Brazil) Marco Antônio

7 goals

- (Chile) Iván Campos

6 goals

- (Uruguay) Gustavo Biscayzacú

3 goals

- (Brazil) Fábio Nascimento
- (Argentina) César La Paglia
- (Uruguay) Mario Regueiro

== Qualified teams for FIFA U-17 World Cup ==
The following three teams from CONMEBOL qualify for the 1995 FIFA U-17 World Championship, including Ecuador who qualified automatically as host.

Team	Qualified on	Previous appearances in FIFA U-17 World Cup
Brazil	19 May 1995	4 (1985, 1987, 1989, 1991)
Argentina	21 May 1995	4 (1985, 1989, 1991, 1993)
Ecuador		1 (1987)
