= 1995 FIFA U-17 World Championship =

3rd U-17 World Championship for the FIFA/JVC Cup-Ecuador 1995 3er Campeonato Mundial Sub-17 por la Copa FIFA/JVC-Ecuador 1995

Tournament details
- Host country: Ecuador
- Dates: 3–20 August
- Teams: 16 (from 6 confederations)
- Venues: 6 (in 6 host cities)

Final positions
- Champions: Ghana (2nd title)
- Runners-up: Brazil
- Third place: Argentina
- Fourth place: Oman

Tournament statistics
- Matches played: 32
- Goals scored: 84 (2.63 per match)
- Attendance: 463,000 (14,469 per match)
- Top scorer(s): (Oman) Mohammed Al-Kathiri (Australia) Daniel Allsopp (5 goals)
- Best player: (Oman) Mohammed Al-Kathiri
- Fair play award: Brazil

The 1995 FIFA U-17 World Championship was the sixth edition of the FIFA U-17 World Championship which was held in the cities of Guayaquil, Portoviejo, Quito, Ibarra, Cuenca, and Riobamba in Ecuador from 3 to 20 August 1995. Players born after 1 August 1978 could participate in this tournament. Ecuador was originally to have hosted the 1991 FIFA U-17 World Championship but due to an outbreak of cholera, that tournament was moved to Italy. It was the first time Ecuador hosted a FIFA tournament.

== Venues ==
Quito	Cuenca	Riobamba	Ibarra
Estadio Olímpico Atahualpa	Estadio Alejandro Serrano Aguilar	Estadio Olímpico de Riobamba	Estadio Olímpico de Ibarra
Capacity: 35,742	Capacity: 16,540	Capacity: 14,400	Capacity: 18,600
1995 FIFA U-17 World Championship is located in Ecuador

== Qualified teams ==
Confederation	Qualifying tournament	Qualifier(s)
AFC (Asia)	1994 AFC U-17 Championship	Japan; Oman; Qatar
CAF (Africa)	1995 African U-17 Championship	Ghana; Guinea; Nigeria
CONCACAF (North, Central America & Caribbean)	1994 CONCACAF U-17 Tournament	Canada; Costa Rica; United States
CONMEBOL (South America)	Host nation	Ecuador
CONMEBOL (South America)	1995 South American U-17 Championship	Argentina; Brazil
OFC (Oceania)	1995 OFC U-17 Qualifying Tournament	Australia
UEFA (Europe)	1995 UEFA U-16 Championship	Germany; Spain; Portugal

== Squads ==
For a list of all squads that played in the final tournament, see 1995 FIFA U-17 World Championship squads

== Referees ==
Asia

- (Iran) Hossein Asgari
- (Malaysia) Ahmad Haji Yaakub

Africa

- (Gabon) Pierre Mounguengui
- (Morocco) Said Belqola
- (Tunisia) Fethi Barkallah

CONCACAF

- (Mexico) Antonio Marrufo
- (Trinidad and Tobago) Ramesh Ramdhan

South America

- (Ecuador) Roger Zambrano
- (Paraguay) Epifanio González
- (Uruguay) José Luis da Rosa

Europe

- (Austria) Fritz Stuchlik
- (Germany) Hartmut Strampe
- (Northern Ireland) Leslie Irvine
- (Ukraine) Vasyl Melnychuk

Oceania

- (New Zealand) Barry Tasker

== Group stage ==
Key to colours in group tables
Group winners and runners-up advance to the Quarterfinals

=== Group A ===
Teams	GP	W	D	L	GF	GA	GD	Pts
Ghana	3	3	0	0	5	1	+4	9
Ecuador	3	1	1	1	3	2	+1	4
Japan	3	1	1	1	2	2	0	4
United States	3	0	0	3	1	6	-5	0

3 August 1995
20:15

Ecuador	2–0	United States
Moreira 31'; Corozo 83'	(Report)

Estadio Olímpico Atahualpa, Quito
Attendance: 28,000
Referee: Fritz Stuchlik (AUT)

3 August 1995
18:00

Ghana	1–0	Japan
Kamara 70'	(Report)

Estadio Olímpico Atahualpa, Quito
Attendance: 28,000
Referee: Leslie Irvine (NIR)

5 August 1995
18:15

Ecuador	1–2	Ghana
Angulo 32'	(Report)	Sule 6'; Gambo 68'

Estadio Olímpico Atahualpa, Quito
Attendance: 18,000
Referee: José Luis da Rosa (URU)

5 August 1995
16:00

United States	1–2	Japan
Redmond 60'	(Report)	Yamazaki 49'; Takahara 86'

Estadio Olímpico Atahualpa, Quito
Attendance: 12,000
Referee: Fritz Stuchlik (AUT)

8 August 1995
20:15

Ecuador	0–0	Japan
	(Report)

Estadio Olímpico Atahualpa, Quito
Attendance: 34,000
Referee: Said Belqola (MAR)

8 August 1995
18:00

United States	0–2	Ghana
	(Report)	Iddrisu 35'; Akwei 65'

Estadio Olímpico Atahualpa, Quito
Attendance: 28,000
Referee: Vasyl Melnychuk (UKR)

=== Group B ===
Teams	GP	W	D	L	GF	GA	GD	Pts
Argentina	3	3	0	0	7	0	+7	9
Portugal	3	1	0	2	5	6	-1	3
Guinea	3	1	0	2	3	6	-3	3
Costa Rica	3	1	0	2	2	5	-3	3

4 August 1995
18:00

Argentina	3–0	Portugal
Gatti 5'; La Paglia 19', 88' (pen.)	(Report)

Estadio Alejandro Serrano Aguilar, Cuenca
Attendance: 6,500
Referee: Hartmut Strampe (GER)

4 August 1995
20:15

Costa Rica	2–0	Guinea
Fonseca 80'; Campos 87'	(Report)

Estadio Alejandro Serrano Aguilar, Cuenca
Attendance: 6,500
Referee: Barry Tasker (NZL)

6 August 1995
13:15

Portugal	2–3	Guinea
Zeferino 11', 26'	(Report)	Bangoura 30'; Conte 48' (pen.); Keita 65'

Estadio Alejandro Serrano Aguilar, Cuenca
Attendance: 2,500
Referee: Ahmed Haji Yaakub (MAS)

6 August 1995
20:15

Argentina	2–0	Costa Rica
Caserio 62'; Gatti 79'	(Report)

Estadio Alejandro Serrano Aguilar, Cuenca
Attendance: 2,500
Referee: Hossein Asgari (IRN)

9 August 1995
18:00

Portugal	3–0	Costa Rica
Vargas 88', 90+1'; Adolfo 89'	(Report)

Estadio Alejandro Serrano Aguilar, Cuenca
Attendance: 15,000
Referee: Roger Zambrano (ECU)

9 August 1995
20:15

Argentina	2–0	Guinea
Peralta 18'; Aimar 26'	(Report)

Estadio Alejandro Serrano Aguilar, Cuenca
Attendance: 15,000
Referee: Antonio Marrufo (MEX)

=== Group C ===
Teams	GP	W	D	L	GF	GA	GD	Pts
Nigeria	3	2	1	0	5	2	+3	7
Australia	3	1	1	1	5	4	+1	4
Spain	3	1	1	1	4	4	0	4
Qatar	3	0	1	2	1	5	-4	1

4 August 1995
12:00

Nigeria	1–1	Qatar
Anyamkyegh 37'	(Report)	Ghulam 39'

Estadio Olímpico de Riobamba, Riobamba
Attendance: 20,000
Referee: Antonio Marrufo (MEX)

4 August 1995
14:15

Australia	2–2	Spain
Allsopp 16', 73'	(Report)	Duarte 55' (pen.); Mista 73'

Estadio Olímpico de Riobamba, Riobamba
Attendance: 20,000
Referee: Ramesh Ramdhan (TRI)

6 August 1995
12:00

Nigeria	2–0	Australia
Anyamkyegh 59'; Obiorah 90+3'	(Report)

Estadio Olímpico de Riobamba, Riobamba
Attendance: 10,000
Referee: Roger Zambrano (ECU)

6 August 1995
14:15

Qatar	0–1	Spain
	(Report)	Ferrón 83'

Estadio Olímpico de Riobamba, Riobamba
Attendance: 10,000
Referee: Epifanio González (PAR)

9 August 1995
12:00

Qatar	0–3	Australia
	(Report)	Kewell 43' (pen.); Allsopp 48', 56'

Estadio Olímpico de Riobamba, Riobamba
Attendance: 10,000
Referee: Hartmut Strampe (GER)

9 August 1995
14:15

Nigeria	2–1	Spain
Obiorah 48'; Onwuzuruike 84'	(Report)	Duarte 57' (pen.)

Estadio Olímpico de Riobamba, Riobamba
Attendance: 10,000
Referee: Barry Tasker (NZL)

=== Group D ===
Teams	GP	W	D	L	GF	GA	GD	Pts
Brazil	3	2	1	0	5	0	+5	7
Oman	3	2	1	0	5	1	+4	7
Germany	3	1	0	2	3	6	-3	3
Canada	3	0	0	3	1	7	-6	0

4 August 1995
13:00

Brazil	3–0	Germany
Djimi 39'; Carlos Alberto 54'; Juan 63'	(Report)

Estadio Olímpico de Ibarra, Ibarra
Attendance: 16,000
Referee: Said Belqola (MAR)

4 August 1995
15:15

Oman	2–1	Canada
Al-Kathiri 43', 62' (pen.)	(Report)	Bernier 70'

Estadio Olímpico de Ibarra, Ibarra
Attendance: 16,000
Referee: Pierre Mounguengui (GAB)

6 August 1995
14:00

Brazil	0–0	Oman
	(Report)

Estadio Olímpico de Ibarra, Ibarra
Attendance: 10,000
Referee: Vasyl Melnychuk (UKR)

6 August 1995
16:15

Germany	3–0	Canada
Brezina 23'; Rost 68'; Bugera 73'	(Report)

Estadio Olímpico de Ibarra, Ibarra
Attendance: 10,000
Referee: Said Belqola (MAR)

9 August 1995
13:00

Germany	0–3	Oman
	(Report)	Al-Kathiri 4' (pen.); Al-Siyabi 81', 87'

Estadio Olímpico de Ibarra, Ibarra
Attendance: 9,000
Referee: José Luis da Rosa (URU)

9 August 1995
15:15

Brazil	2–0	Canada
Bel 2'; Eduardo 46'	(Report)

Estadio Olímpico de Ibarra, Ibarra
Attendance: 9,000
Referee: Leslie Irvine (NIR)

== Knockout stage ==
Quarter-finals
12 August - Quito
Ghana	2
Portugal	0
13 August - Portoviejo
Oman	2
Nigeria	1
12 August - Guayaquil
Argentina	3
Ecuador	1
13 August - Portoviejo
Brazil	3
Australia	1

Semi-finals
17 August - Portoviejo
Ghana	3
Oman	1
17 August - Guayaquil
Brazil	3
Argentina	0

Final
20 August - Guayaquil
Ghana	3
Brazil	2
Third place
20 August - Guayaquil
Argentina	2
Oman	0

=== Quarter-finals ===
12 August 1995
17:00

Ghana	2–0	Portugal
Bentil 12'; Amaniampong 87'	(Report)

Estadio Olímpico Atahualpa, Quito
Attendance: 2,000
Referee: Epifanio González (PAR)
12 August 1995
20:00

Nigeria	1–2	Oman
Chukwueke 13' (pen.)	(Report)	Al-Kathiri 32'; Al-Dhabit 49'

Estadio Reales Tamarindos, Portoviejo
Attendance: 12,000
Referee: Hartmut Strampe (GER)

13 August 1995
14:00

Brazil	3–1	Australia
Rodrigo 14'; Kléber 65'; Marco Antônio 75'	(Report)	Allsopp 32'

Estadio Reales Tamarindos, Portoviejo
Attendance: 12,000
Referee: Antonio Maruffo (MEX)
13 August 1995
17:00

Argentina	3–1	Ecuador
Mercado 36' (o.g.); Aimar 46'; Gatti 66'	(Report)	Ayala 86'

Estadio Monumental, Guayaquil
Attendance: 10,000
Referee: Leslie Irvine (NIR)

=== Semi-finals ===
17 August 1995
17:00

Ghana	3–1	Oman
Ansah 38'; Kamara 54'; Iddrisu 72'	(Report)	Al-Kathiri 67'

Estadio Reales Tamarindos, Portoviejo
Attendance: 18,000
Referee: José Luis da Rosa (URU)

17 August 1995
20:00

Argentina	0–3	Brazil
	(Report)	Rodrigo 74'; Rocha 88'; Fabio 90'

Estadio Monumental, Guayaquil
Attendance: 3,000
Referee: Fritz Stuchlik (AUT)

=== Third place play-off ===
20 August 1995
14:30

Oman	0–2	Argentina
	(Report)	Gatti 20'; Cambiasso 71'

Estadio Monumental, Guayaquil
Attendance: 30,000
Referee: Said Belqola (MAR)

=== Final ===
20 August 1995
17:00

Ghana	3–2	Brazil
Sule 39'; Iddrisu 45'; Bentil 49'	(Report)	Juan 47'; Marco Antônio 90'

Estadio Monumental, Guayaquil
Attendance: 30,000
Referee: Leslie Irvine (NIR)

== Result ==
1995 FIFA U-17 World Championship winners

Ghana
Second title

== Goalscorers ==
Daniel Allsopp of Australia won the Golden Shoe award for scoring five goals. In total, 84 goals were scored by 57 different players, with only one of them credited as own goal.

5 goals

- (Australia) Daniel Allsopp
- (Oman) Mohammed Amar Al-Kathiri

4 goals

- (Argentina) Fernando Gatti

3 goals

- (Ghana) Abu Iddrisu

2 goals

- (Argentina) César La Paglia
- (Argentina) Pablo Aimar
- (Brazil) Juan
- (Brazil) Marco Antônio
- (Brazil) Rodrigo
- (Ghana) Baba Sule
- (Ghana) Dini Kamara
- (Ghana) Emmanuel Bentil
- (Nigeria) Edward Anyamkyegh
- (Nigeria) James Obiorah
- (Oman) Taqi Al-Siyabi
- (Portugal) Vargas
- (Portugal) Zeferino
- (Spain) Jesús Duarte

1 goal

- (Argentina) Esteban Cambiasso
- (Argentina) Luis Caserio
- (Argentina) Sixto Peralta
- (Australia) Harry Kewell
- (Brazil) Bel
- (Brazil) Carlos Alberto
- (Brazil) Djimi
- (Brazil) Eduardo
- (Brazil) Fabio
- (Brazil) Kléber
- (Brazil) Rocha
- (Canada) Patrice Bernier
- (Costa Rica) Andrey Campos
- (Costa Rica) Nelson Fonseca
- (Ecuador) Diego Ayala
- (Ecuador) Exon Corozo
- (Ecuador) Felix Angulo
- (Ecuador) Luis Moreira
- (Germany) Alexander Bugera
- (Germany) Damian Brezina
- (Germany) Timo Rost
- (Ghana) Attakora Amaniampong
- (Ghana) Bashiru Gambo
- (Ghana) Charles Akwei
- (Ghana) Joseph Ansah
- (Guinea) Ibrahima Conte
- (Guinea) Ousmane Bangoura
- (Guinea) Souleymane Keita
- (Japan) Kotaro Yamazaki
- (Japan) Naohiro Takahara
- (Nigeria) Chiedu Chukwueke
- (Nigeria) Henry Onwuzuruike
- (Oman) Hani Al-Dhabit
- (Portugal) Adolfo
- (Qatar) Jaweed Ghulam
- (Spain) Jordi Ferrón
- (Spain) Mista
- (United States) Jorge Redmond

Own goal

- (Ecuador) Víctor Mercado (playing against Argentina)

== Final ranking ==
Rank	Team	Pld	W	D	L	GF	GA	GD	Pts
1	Ghana	6	6	0	0	13	4	+9	18
2	Brazil	6	4	1	1	13	4	+9	13
3	Argentina	6	5	0	1	12	4	+8	15
4	Oman	6	3	1	2	8	7	+1	10
Eliminated in the quarter-finals
5	Nigeria	4	2	1	1	6	4	+2	7
6	Australia	4	1	1	2	6	7	–1	4
7	Ecuador	4	1	1	2	4	5	–1	4
8	Portugal	4	1	0	3	5	8	–3	3
Eliminated at the group stage
9	Spain	3	1	1	1	4	4	0	4
10	Japan	3	1	1	1	2	2	0	4
11	Germany	3	1	0	2	3	6	–3	3
11	Guinea	3	1	0	2	3	6	–3	3
13	Costa Rica	3	1	0	2	2	5	–3	3
14	Qatar	3	0	1	2	1	5	–4	1
15	United States	3	0	0	3	1	6	–5	0
16	Canada	3	0	0	3	1	7	–6	0
