= Oman national under-17 football team =

National association football team

Oman Under-17
- Nickname(s): Al-Ahmar (The Reds); Samba Al-Khaleej (Gulf Samba)
- Association: Oman Football Association
- Confederation: AFC (Asia)
- Sub-confederation: WAFF (West Asia)
- Head coach: Anwar Al Habsi
- Home stadium: Sultan Qaboos Sports Complex
- FIFA code: OMA
First colours	Second colours

Biggest win
- Guam 0–18 Oman (Bishan, Singapore; 25 October 2024)

FIFA U-17 World Cup
- Appearances: 3 (first in 1995)
- Best result: Fourth place (1995)

AFC U-17 Asian Cup
- Appearances: 11 (first in 1994)
- Best result: Champions (1996, 2000)

WAFF U-16 Championship
- Appearances: 1 (first in 2019)
- Best result: Fifth place (2019)

The Oman national under-17 football team is the under 17 football team of Oman and is controlled by the Oman Football Association.

At the first FIFA U-17 World Cup, the team placed fourth at the 1995 FIFA U-17 World Championship, losing 2–0 in the 3rd place playoff to Argentina.

== Players ==
=== Current Squad ===
The following 23 players were selected for the most recent fixtures in the 2026 AFC U-17 Asian Cup qualification.

No.	Pos.	Player	Date of birth (age)	Club
1	GK	Abdullah Al-Balushi		(Oman Football Association) Al-Mussanah
12	GK	Salem Al-Rawahi		(Oman Football Association) Samail Club
23	GK	Abdullah Al-Zaabi		(Oman Football Association) Al Seeb
3	DF	Al-Azhar Al-Saadi		(Oman Football Association) Al-Suwaiq
6	DF	Turki Al-Ruzaiqi		(Oman Football Association) Al-Mussanah
15	DF	Mishal Al-Ruqadi		(Oman Football Association) Al-Amerat
2	DF	Mohammed Al-Balushi		(Oman Football Association) Al-Amerat
4	DF	Mohammed Al-Jabri		(Oman Football Association) Al-Amerat
13	DF	Mohammed Al-Hashem		(Oman Football Association) Al-Mussanah
19	DF	Awad Al-Saadi		(Oman Football Association) Al-Amerat
7	MF	Mubarak Al-Amiri		(Oman Football Association) Al Seeb
8	MF	Abdullah Al-Saadi	19 October 2009 (age 17)	(Oman Football Association) Al-Amerat
10	MF	Saad Al-Mamari	1 March 2009 (age 17)	(Oman Football Association) Dibba SCC
11	MF	Namer Al-Amri		(Oman Football Association) Al-Amerat
18	MF	Ahmed Al-Yahmadi		(Oman Football Association) Al-Mussanah
20	MF	Mohammed Al-Arini		(Oman Football Association) Al-Bashaer
5	MF	Nizar Al-Sulaimi		(Oman Football Association) Al Seeb
9	FW	Moath Al-Hinai		(Oman Football Association) Al Seeb
14	FW	Bashar Al-Shamsi		(Oman Football Association) Al-Amerat
16	FW	Bashar Al-Ghafri		(Oman Football Association) Al-Bashaer
17	FW	Saleh Al-Balushi		(Oman Football Association) Al-Nasr SC (Salalah)
21	FW	Turki Al-Ghassani		(Oman Football Association) Al Seeb
22	FW	Al-Hassan Bahjaj		(Oman Football Association) Al Ittihad (Salalah)

== Competitive record ==
=== FIFA U-17 World Cup ===
Host nation(s) / Year	Round
(China) 1985	Did not qualify
(Canada) 1987	Did not qualify
(Scotland) 1989	Did not qualify
(Italy) 1991	Did not qualify
(Japan) 1993	Did not qualify
(Ecuador) 1995	Fourth place
(Egypt) 1997	Quarter-finals
(New Zealand) 1999	Did not qualify
(Trinidad and Tobago) 2001	Group stage
(Finland) 2003	Did not qualify
(Peru) 2005	Did not qualify
(South Korea) 2007	Did not qualify
(Nigeria) 2009	Did not qualify
(Mexico) 2011	Did not qualify
(United Arab Emirates) 2013	Did not qualify
(Chile) 2015	Did not qualify
(India) 2017	Did not qualify
(Brazil) 2019	Did not qualify
(Indonesia) 2023	Did not qualify
(Qatar) 2025	Did not qualify
(Qatar) 2026	Did not qualify
(Qatar) 2027	Did not qualify

=== AFC U-17 Cup ===
Host nation(s) / Year	Round
(Qatar) 1985	Withdrew
(Qatar) 1986	Did not qualify
(Thailand) 1988	Did not qualify
(United Arab Emirates) 1990	Did not qualify
(Saudi Arabia) 1992	Withdrew
(Qatar) 1994	Third place
(Thailand) 1996	Champions
(Qatar) 1998	Group stage
(Vietnam) 2000	Champions
(United Arab Emirates) 2002	Banned
(Japan) 2004	Quarter-finals
(Singapore) 2006	Did not qualify
(Uzbekistan) 2008	Did not qualify
(Uzbekistan) 2010	Group stage
(Iran) 2012	Group stage
(Thailand) 2014	Group stage
(India) 2016	Quarter-finals
(Malaysia) 2018	Quarter-finals
(Bahrain) ~~2020~~	Qualified but later cancelled
(Thailand) 2023	Did not qualify
(Saudi Arabia) 2025	Group Stage
(Saudi Arabia) 2026	Did not qualify
(Uzbekistan) 2027	Did not qualify

== Oman FIFA Under-17 World Cup appearances ==
=== 1995 FIFA U-17 World Championship ===
They played 6 matches in all, with the results shown below.

=== Group stage ===
August 4, 1995
15:15

Oman	2–1	Canada
Al-Kathiri 43', 62' (pen.)	(Report)	Bernier 70'

Estadio Olímpico de Ibarra, Ibarra
Attendance: 16,000
Referee: Pierre Mounguengui (Gabon)

August 6, 1995
14:00

Brazil	0–0	Oman
	(Report)

Estadio Olímpico de Ibarra, Ibarra
Attendance: 10,000
Referee: Vasyl Melnychuk (Ukraine)

August 9, 1995
13:00

Germany	0–3	Oman
	(Report)	Al-Kathiri 4' (pen.); Al-Siyabi 81', 87'

Estadio Olímpico de Ibarra, Ibarra
Attendance: 9,000
Referee: José Luis da Rosa (Uruguay)

=== Knockout stage ===
They played Nigeria in the Quarter-finals

August 12, 1995
20:00

Nigeria	1–2	Oman
Chukwueke 13' (pen.)	(Report)	Al-Kathiri 32'; Al-Dhabit 49'

Estadio Reales Tamarindos, Portoviejo
Attendance: 12,000
Referee: Hartmut Strampe (Germany)

They Played Ghana in the Semi-finals

August 17, 1995
17:00

Ghana	3–1	Oman
Ansah 38'; Kamara 54'; Iddrisu 72'	(Report)	Al-Kathiri 67'

Estadio Reales Tamarindos, Portoviejo
Attendance: 18,000
Referee: José Luis da Rosa (Uruguay)

They played Argentina in the third place match.

August 20, 1995
14:30

Oman	0–2	Argentina
	(Report)	Gatti 20'; Cambiasso 71'

Estadio Monumental, Guayaquil
Attendance: 30,000
Referee: Said Belqola (Morocco)

The Omanis got fourth place in the tournament.

=== 1997 FIFA U-17 World Championship ===
They played 4 matches in all, with the results shown below.

=== Group stage ===
September 6, 1997
13:45

Oman	4 – 0	United States
Al Harbi 15'; J. Al Mukhaini 39'; Mohamed 46', 52'	Report

Alexandria Stadium, Alexandria
Attendance: 20,000
Referee: Mario Sanchez Yanten (Chile)

September 8, 1997
16:00

Oman	3 – 1	Austria
Nairooz 18'; Mohamed 45+1', 69'	Report	Ziervogel 74'

Alexandria Stadium, Alexandria
Attendance: 19,000
Referee: Eugene Brazzale (Australia)

September 11, 1997
16:00

Oman	1 – 3	Brazil
Mohamed 53'	Report	Jorginho 50'; Fabio Pinto 66'; Geovani 84'

Alexandria Stadium, Alexandria
Attendance: 20,000
Referee: Gilberto Alcala (Mexico)

=== Knockout stage ===
They played Ghana in the Quarter-finals

September 15, 1997
16:00

Ghana	4 – 1	Oman
Al Mukhaini 25' (o.g.); Coffie 42'; Afriyie 79'; A. Quaye 88'	Report	Al Amri 57'

Port Said Stadium, Port Said
Attendance: 15,000
Referee: Rene Temmink (Netherlands)

=== 2001 FIFA U-17 World Championship ===
The Omanis fared much worse, getting last place in their group and failing to reach the knockout stages.

=== Group stage ===
September 15, 2001
16:00

Oman	1 – 2	Spain
Al Hinai 22'	Report	F. Torres 50'; Melli 90+2'

Ato Boldon Stadium, Couva
Attendance: 7,500
Referee: Richard Contreras Samuel (Dominican Republic)

September 17, 2001
19:30

Oman	0 – 3	Argentina
	Report	López 10'; Tevez 37'; Colace 52' (pen.)

Manny Ramjohn Stadium, Marabella
Attendance: 7,500
Referee: Evehe Divine (Cameroon)

September 20, 2001
17:00

Burkina Faso	1 – 1	Oman
Nikiema 22'	Report	Al-Hinai 33'

Ato Boldon Stadium, Couva
Attendance: 7,000
Referee: Alexandru Tudor (Romania)

== Head-to-head record ==
The following table shows Oman's head-to-head record in the FIFA U-17 World Cup and AFC U-17 Asian Cup.

=== In FIFA U-17 World Cup ===
Opponent	Pld	W	D	L	GF	GA	GD	Win %
Argentina	2	0	0	2	0	5	−5	0.00
Austria	1	1	0	0	3	1	+2	100.00
Brazil	2	0	1	1	1	3	−2	0.00
Burkina Faso	1	0	1	0	1	1	+0	0.00
Canada	1	1	0	0	2	1	+1	100.00
Germany	1	1	0	0	3	0	+3	100.00
Ghana	2	0	0	2	2	7	−5	0.00
Nigeria	1	1	0	0	2	1	+1	100.00
Spain	1	0	0	1	1	2	−1	0.00
United States	1	1	0	0	4	0	+4	100.00
Total	13	5	2	6	19	21	−2	38.46

=== In AFC U-17 Asian Cup ===
Opponent	Pld	W	D	L	GF	GA	GD	Win %
Australia	1	0	0	1	1	2	−1	0.00
Bahrain	3	2	0	1	5	4	+1	66.67
Bangladesh	2	1	1	0	4	2	+2	50.00
China	2	1	0	1	2	1	+1	50.00
Iran	4	2	0	2	6	9	−3	50.00
Iraq	2	0	1	1	2	3	−1	0.00
Japan	5	1	1	3	10	13	−3	20.00
Jordan	1	0	1	0	2	2	+0	0.00
Kuwait	2	2	0	0	6	3	+3	100.00
Laos	1	1	0	0	2	0	+2	100.00
Malaysia	2	1	0	1	4	2	+2	50.00
North Korea	4	0	2	2	5	8	−3	0.00
Qatar	1	0	0	1	0	1	−1	0.00
Saudi Arabia	1	1	0	0	1	0	+1	100.00
South Korea	5	1	1	3	4	8	−4	20.00
Syria	1	0	0	1	0	1	−1	0.00
Tajikistan	1	0	0	1	1	2	−1	0.00
Thailand	4	3	0	1	6	4	+2	75.00
Uzbekistan	2	2	0	0	14	2	+12	100.00
Vietnam	1	1	0	0	2	1	+1	100.00
Yemen	1	1	0	0	2	0	+2	100.00
Total	46	20	7	19	79	68	+11	43.48
