= Oman Football Association =

Governing body of association football in Oman

AFC
- Short name: OFA
- Founded: 1978
- Headquarters: Muscat, Oman
- FIFA affiliation: 1980
- AFC affiliation: 1980
- WAFF affiliation: 2010
- President: Sheikh Salem Said Salem Al Wahaibi
- General Secretary: Said Al Bulushi
- Website: www.ofa.om

The Oman Football Association (Arabic: الاتحاد العُماني لكرة القدم) is the governing body of football in Oman. It was founded in 1978, and has been a member of the Asian Football Confederation and of FIFA since 1980.

== History ==
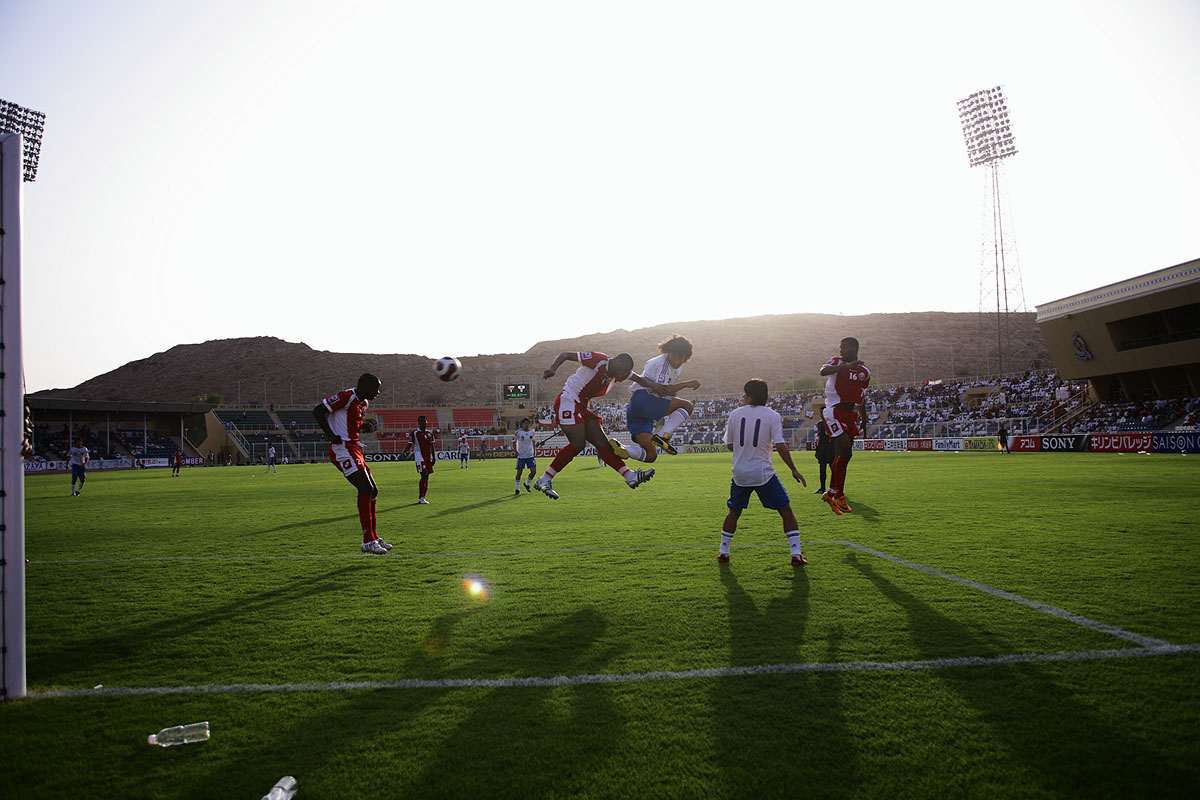
Oman plays against Japan in the qualifying rounds for the 2010 FIFA World Cup

The first football club of the Sultanate (documented as such) was the Maqboul Club, founded in 1942, known today as the Oman Club. In the 1970s, Qaboos bin Said al Said favored the development of sports events and associations, which led in 1978 to the creation of the Omani Football Association with Sayyid / Haitham bin Tariq Al Said (Minister of National Heritage and Culture and in 2020, the successor to Qaboos as Sultan) as its first president. In its first year of operations, the Association became a member of the Union of Arab Football Associations and of FIFA, and joined the Asian Football Federation in 1980.

In November 2017, the OFA was chosen to organize the FIFA Executive Football Summit scheduled for February 2018.

== Association staff ==
Name	Position	Source
(Oman) Sayyid Suleiman bin Hamood bin Ali Al Busaidi	President	
(Oman) Qutaiba bin Saeed bin Mohammed Al Ghailani	Senior Vice President	
(Oman) Abdullah bin Salim bin Awadh Al Shanfari BM Hajer bint Khamis bin Marhoon Al Muzayni Female member Women's Member Abdullah bin Ali bin Mohammed Al Rashdi BM Ali bin Ahmed bin Saeed Al Kathiri BM Mohammed bin Khamis bin Juma Al Araimi BM	2nd Vice President	
(Oman) Mohammed bin Sulaiman Al-Yahmadi	General Secretary	
n/a	Treasurer	
Ali Al Khansabi Technical Office Manager	Technical Director	
(Croatia) Tarik Sektioui	Team Coach (Men's)	
n/a	Team Coach (Women's)	
William Boukarroum	Media/Communications Manager	
n/a	Futsal Coordinator	
Omer Khalaf	Referee Coordinator	

== Description ==
Oman has a total of 45 clubs divided into three divisions. The First Division has 12 clubs, Second Division has 13 clubs while the Third Division has 20 clubs.

Oman is looking to take advantage of FIFA's assistance in the GOAL project to further develop the game in Oman.

The Association is 70%-financed by the government through the Ministry of Sports Affairs (2010).

== Individual awards ==
Year	Player	Award
1995	Mohamed Al Kathiri	1995 Asian Young Footballer of the Year
1995	Mohamed Al Kathiri	Golden Ball of 1995 FIFA U-17 World Championship
2002	Hani Al Dhabit	Golden Shoe of the 15th Arabian Gulf Cup
2003	Ali Al-Habsi	Best Goalkeeper of the 16th Arabian Gulf Cup
2004	Imad Al-Hosni	Golden Shoe of the 17th Arabian Gulf Cup
2004	Ali Al-Habsi	Best Goalkeeper of the 17th Arabian Gulf Cup
2007	Ali Al-Habsi	Best Goalkeeper of the 18th Arabian Gulf Cup
2009	Ali Al-Habsi	Best Goalkeeper of the 19th Arabian Gulf Cup
2016	Abu Bakar al-Amri	Recognized in January 2016 with a special award given by the Asian Football Confederation for being part of the refereeing team of the 2015 FIFA U-20 World Cup final in New Zealand. Al-Amri was decorated along Saudi referees Fahad Al-Mirdasi and Abdullah Al-Shalwai, who took part in the final too.

== Team awards and achievements ==
Year	Team	Award	Competition
1989	(Oman) Fanja	Won first-place trophy	Gulf Clubs Championship 1989
1994	Oman F.C.	Won second place	Asian Club Championship 1993-94
1994	Oman U-17 Team	Won third-place trophy	AFC U-17 Championship 1994
1995	Oman U-17 Team	Reached fourth place in tournament	1995 FIFA U-17 World Championship
1995	(Oman) Dhofar S.C.S.C.	Won second place	Gulf Clubs Championship 1995
1996	Oman U-17 Team	Won first-place trophy	AFC U-17 Championship 1996
2000	Oman U-17 Team	Won first-place trophy	AFC U-17 Championship 2000
2004	Oman National Team	Won second-place trophy	17th Arabian Gulf Cup
2007	Oman National Team	Won second-place trophy	18th Arabian Gulf Cup
2009	Oman National Team	Won the Gulf Cup	19th Arabian Gulf Cup
2012	Oman U-21 Team	Runners up AFC VS CAF	Olympics 2012
2015	(Oman) Seeb	Was 1st Runners up	Gulf Clubs Championship 2015

== Omani League teams 2010-11 ==
Al-Ahli (Sedab)
Al-Hilal (Salalah)
Al-Nahda
Al-Nasr
Al-Oruba
Al-Shabab
Al-Suwaiq
Al-Talia
Dhofar
Muscat
Oman FC
Saham

== See also ==
Oman Professional League - National football league of Oman

Sultan Qaboos Cup - National cup of Oman

Oman Professional League Cup - League cup of Oman
