= Andrey Campos =

Costa Rican footballer (born 1978)

Andrey Campos Vargas
Personal information
- Full name: Andrey Campos Vargas
- Date of birth: December 7, 1978 (age 47)
- Place of birth: Costa Rica
- Height: 1.62 m (5 ft 4 in)
- Position: Midfielder

Youth career
- Esparza Uyejeh: Esparza F.C

Senior career*
Years	Team	Apps	(Gls)
2002–2004	San Carlos		(250)
2004–2005	Pérez Zeledón		
2005–2006	Herediano		
2006–2008	Santos de Guápiles		
2008–2009	Puntarenas		
2009	Cartaginés		
2009	América de Chimaltenango		
- * Club domestic league appearances and goals

Andrey Campos Vargas (born December 7, 1978) is a retired football player born in Costa Rica.

== Club career ==
He played for San Carlos, Pérez Zeledón, Herediano, Santos de Guápiles, Puntarenas, and Cartaginés. He had a spell abroad with Guatemalan side América de Chimaltenango Campos was known as a talented skillful offensive middle fielder with some fine skills for passing, dribbling, and shooting.

== International career ==
He played at the 1995 FIFA U-17 World Championship and 1997 FIFA World Youth Championship but never played for the senior Costa Rica national football team.
