= James Obiorah =

Nigerian footballer (born 1978)

Personal information
- Full name: James Chibuzor Oboriah
- Date of birth: 24 August 1978 (age 48)
- Place of birth: Jos, Nigeria
- Height: 1.85 m (6 ft 1 in)
- Position: Forward

Youth career
- –1994: Kalba Union

Senior career*
Years	Team	Apps	(Gls)
1994	Kwara Bombers	20	(9)
1995	Enyimba	19	(0)
1995–1998	Anderlecht	30	(6)
1998–2001	Grasshopper Zurich	14	(0)
2001–2004	Lokomotiv Moscow	62	(20)
2003–2004	→ Cádiz (loan)	17	(2)
2004–2005	→ Chamois Niortais (loan)	12	(4)
2005–2006	Grazer AK	5	(0)
2006–2007	Chamois Niortais	16	(2)
2007–2008	Kaduna United	23	(1)
2008–2009	Toulon	11	(2)
Total		229	(46)

International career
1995	Nigeria U17	4	(2)
1998–2002	Nigeria	3	(1)
- * Club domestic league appearances and goals

James Chibuzor Obiorah (born 24 August 1978) is a Nigerian former professional footballer who played as a forward.

He is best known for his time in Russia as a Lokomotiv Moscow player, with whom he won the Russian Premier League in 2002 and 2004, on top of a few other domestic cup trophies. He also played for the national team at the 2002 FIFA World Cup and the 2002 Unity Cup.

== Club career ==
His previous clubs include RSC Anderlecht, Grasshopper Zurich, Cádiz, Grazer AK and Lokomotiv Moscow and he was also loaned to Niort from Lokomotiv Moscow in the 2004–05 season, scoring 4 goals in 12 games. In 2007, he played for Kaduna United, after being released from his contract with French Ligue 2 side Niort. In August 2008 he moved from Kaduna United to Toulon.

== International career ==
Obiorah was the captain of the Nigeria side that reached the quarter-finals of the 1995 FIFA U-17 World Championship and also played for the Nigeria national team three times, including being called up for the 2002 FIFA World Cup, scoring 1 goal.

His only goal for Nigeria came at the 2002 Unity Cup against Jamaica.
