= 2002 Unity Cup =

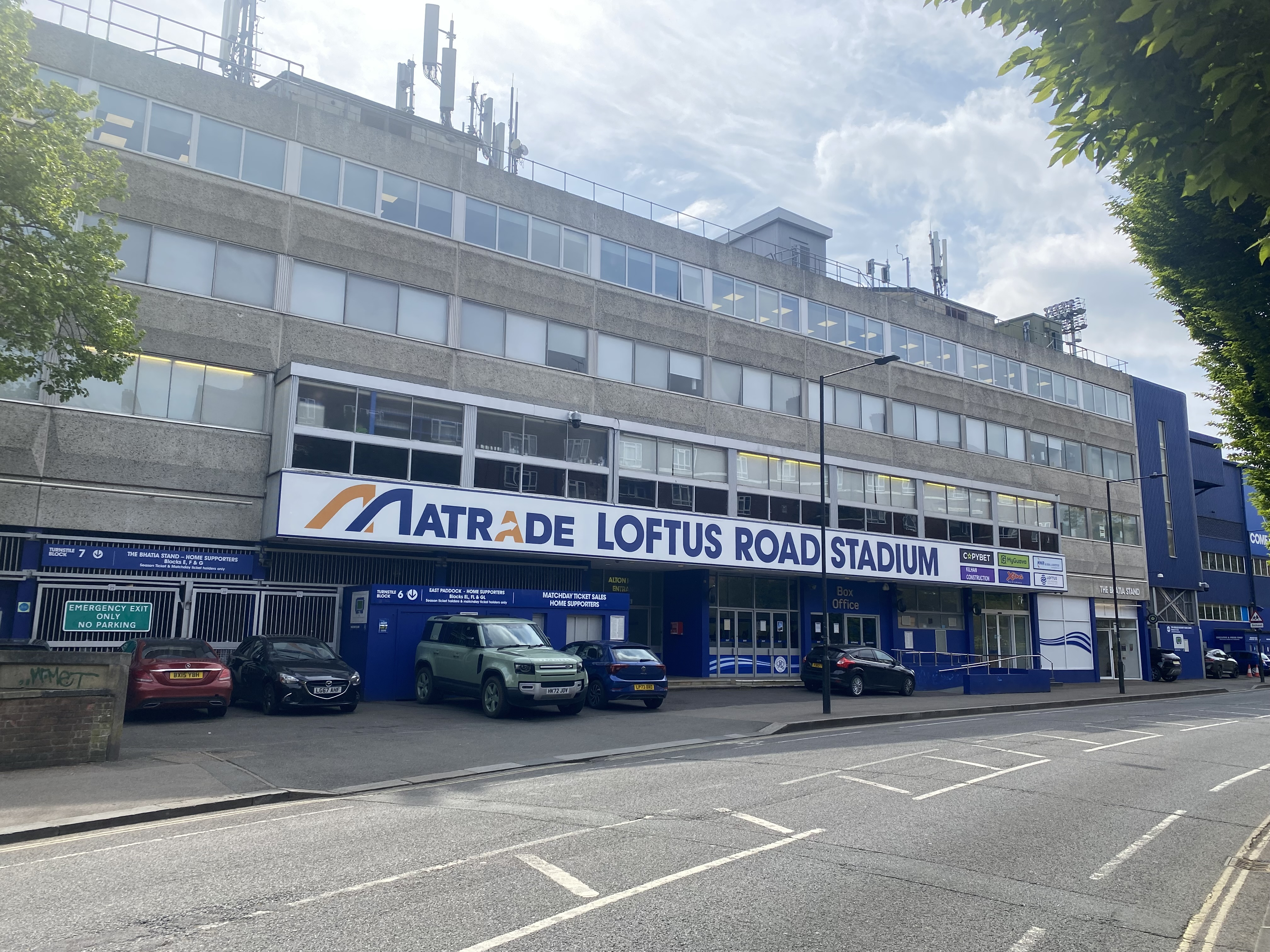
- Loftus Road hosted the match

Tournament details
- Host country: England
- City: London
- Dates: 18 May
- Teams: 2
- Venue: Loftus Road

Final positions
- Champions: Nigeria (1st title)
- Runners-up: Jamaica

Tournament statistics
- Matches played: 1
- Goals scored: 1 (1 per match)
- Top scorer: (Nigeria) James Obiorah (1 goal)

The 2002 Unity Cup was an international football match held on 18 May at Loftus Road in London, England. Nigeria and Jamaica were the competing sides.

Nigeria won the competition. The competitors were countries with large diasporas in London.

== Match ==
Nigeria won their first Unity Cup title by winning this match through a single goal scored by James Obiorah.

18 May 2002

Nigeria	1–0	Jamaica
Obiorah 49'	Report

Loftus Road, London
Referee: Andy D'Urso (England)
