= Edward Anyamkyegh =

Nigerian footballer (1978–2026)

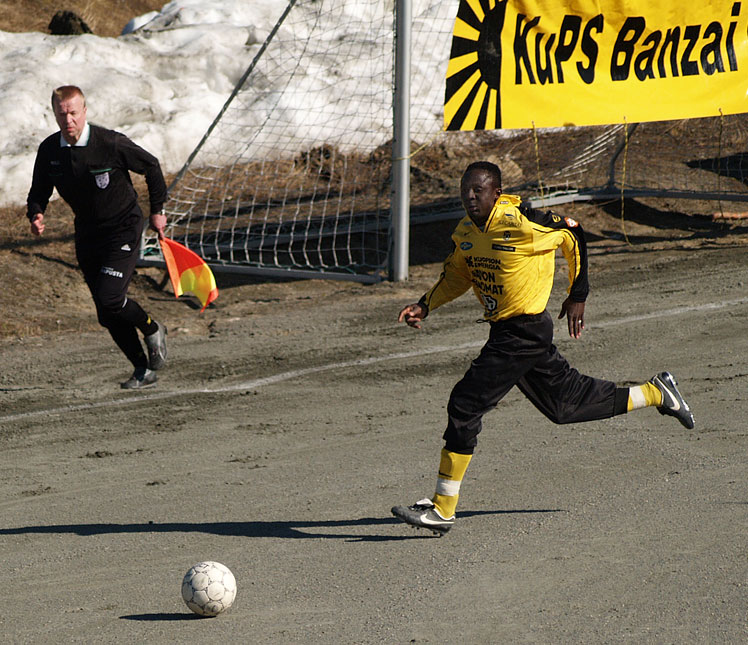
- Anyamkyegh playing for KuPS in the 2005 Finnish Cup

Personal information
- Date of birth: 10 October 1978
- Place of birth: Gboko, Benue State, Nigeria
- Date of death: 4 November 2026 (aged 48)
- Place of death: Gboko, Benue State, Nigeria
- Position: Forward

Senior career*
Years	Team	Apps	(Gls)
1996–1997	BCC Lions		
1998	Julius Berger		
1999–2001	Sheriff Tiraspol	63	(18)
2001–2004	Karpaty Lviv	48	(3)
2001–2004	→ Karpaty-2 Lviv	13	(0)
2001–2003	→ Karpaty-3 Lviv	7	(1)
2005	KuPS	26	(4)
2007	Sepsi-78	21	(10)
2008	PS Kemi	7	(0)
2009	SoVo	20	(5)
2010–2011	Atlantis	37	(6)

International career
1995	Nigeria U17	3	(2)
- * Club domestic league appearances and goals

Edward Tyover Anyamkyegh (10 October 1978 – 4 November 2026) was a Nigerian professional footballer who played as a forward.

== Career ==
Anyamkyegh played for Sheriff Tiraspol, Karpaty Lviv and KuPS in the top divisions of Moldova, Ukraine and Finland in 1999–2005. Anyamkyegh ended his career representing various clubs in the Finnish lower divisions in 2007–2011. He was also a member of the Nigerian squad in the 1995 FIFA U-17 World Championship scoring two goals in the group stage.

The 2004 book How Soccer Explains the World by Franklin Foer includes a chapter following Anyamkyegh's career in Ukraine.

== Death ==
Anyamkyegh died in Gboko, Benue State, on 4 November 2026, at the age of 48.
