= Andy D'Urso =

English football referee

- Full name: Andrew Paul D'Urso
- Born: 30 November 1963 (age 62); Hackney, London, England

Domestic
Years	League	Role
1994–2015	Football League	Referee
1999–2005	Premier League	Referee

International
Years	League	Role
2001–2005	FIFA	Referee

Andrew Paul D'Urso (born 30 November 1963) is an English former football referee in the Football League. D'Urso is based in Billericay, Essex and is a member of the Barking & Dagenham Referees Society. He retired at the end of the 2014–15 season.

== Career ==
D'Urso was first promoted to the Football League in 1994; five seasons later he was promoted onto the Premier League list. In 2001, he was nominated for FIFA status, officiating in a full international in May 2004 when the Republic of Ireland played Nigeria.

On 29 January 2000 while refereeing the game between Manchester United and Middlesbrough, D'Urso awarded Middlesbrough a penalty kick when Juninho was tackled by Jaap Stam. Upon awarding the kick, six Manchester United players (Roy Keane, Nicky Butt, David Beckham, Jaap Stam, Ryan Giggs and Denis Irwin) chased D'Urso to object to the decision; the resulting image was freely circulated by the media. D'Urso said of the incident: "It was my first season in the Premier League, my first time refereeing Manchester United and my first time at Old Trafford. With more experience I would have stood my ground. I kept saying 'go away', but the further back I walked the more they walked on. A more experienced referee would not have retreated. But there are no grudges. I've refereed Roy Keane on a number of occasions since without a problem." Several players, notably Keane and Stam, have since voiced their regret of the incident. D'Urso booked Keane for dissent shortly after the incident.

He refereed the 2001 FA Charity Shield, 2002 Unity Cup, and 2004 Unity Cup.

The Football Association suspended D'Urso for 28 days from 27 August 2004 when he failed to send off Blackburn Rovers captain Barry Ferguson after showing him two yellow cards. D'Urso vowed to carry on with his refereeing career. D'Urso appealed, successfully, against the decision to relegate him from the Select Group, but he was not selected for a single Premiership match after the 2005–06 season.

Preceded by Mike Riley	FA Charity Shield referee 2001	Succeeded by Alan Wiley
