= Joseph Ansah =

Ghanaian footballer (born 1978)

Personal information
- Date of birth: 5 November 1978 (age 47)
- Place of birth: Accra, Ghana
- Position: Midfielder

Youth career
- Afienya United

Senior career*
Years	Team	Apps	(Gls)
1994–1996	Afienya United		
1996–2005	Hearts of Oak		
2006–2007	Tema Youth		

International career
1995–1997	Ghana U17		
1995–2003	Ghana	7	(0)
- * Club domestic league appearances and goals

Joseph Ansah (born 5 November 1978) is a Ghanaian former professional footballer who played as a midfielder for Accra Hearts of Oak for most of his career. He also played for the Ghana national football team.

He was part of the 2000s Hearts of Oak team that won several laurels for the club. He won the Ghana Premier League seven times winning it in four consecutive seasons from 1999 to 2002. He helped the club win the 2000 CAF Champions League and the 2001 CAF Super Cup. He served as captain of the side within the 2000s.

At the international level, Ansah was a key member of the Ghana national under-17 football team from 1995 to 1997, featuring in two world cups in 1995 and 1997, in the process winning in 1995 and placing 4th in the 1997 edition.

== Club career ==
=== Hearts of Oak ===
Ansah started his career with Afienya United where he played there for two seasons from 1994 to 1996. He joined Accra Hearts of Oak in the 1996–97 season, winning the Ghana Premier League in his debut season. He went on to play for the club for 8 seasons from 1996 to 2005. He was the deputy captain and member of squad that won the CAF Champions League and Super Cup in 2000. He rose to become the deputy captain and captain of the side. He won the Ghana Premier League seven times, the Ghanaian FA Cup twice, and the Ghana Super Cup twice.

=== Tema Youth ===
He later joined Tema Youth in July 2006. After a season, with the club he retired from football in July 2007.

== International career ==
Ansah was part of the Ghana U-17 side in 1995 to 1997 and was part of the squad that won the 1995 FIFA U-17 World Championship. featured for Ghana national football team twice between 1995 and 2003. He made his debut on 12 November 1995 in a friendly match against Sierra Leone which ended in a 2–0 victory.

== Honours ==
Hearts of Oak

- Ghana Premier League: 1996–97, 1997–98, 1999, 2000, 2001, 2002, 2004
- Ghanaian FA Cup: 1999, 2000
- Ghana Super Cup: 1997, 1998
- CAF Champions League: 2000
- CAF Confederation Cup: 2004
- CAF Super Cup: 2001

Ghana U17

- FIFA U-17 World Championship: 1995
