= David Diach =

Costa Rican footballer (born 1974)

David Diachbape (aka El Domador de Micos)
Personal information
- Full name: David Angelo Diach Madrigal
- Date of birth: 7 June 1974 (age 52)
- Place of birth: Costa Rica
- Height: 1.86 m (6 ft 1 in)
- Position: Striker

Team information
- Current team: Halcones

Youth career
- Saprissa

Senior career*
Years	Team	Apps	(Gls)
1995	Vecinos		
1996–1998	Carmelita		
1999	Alajuelense		
1999	Trikala	14	(4)
2000	Paniliakos	14	(3)
2001	Roma Paraná		
2002	Ceará		
2002–2003	Guanacasteca		
2003	Herediano		
2004	Nanjing Yoyo		
2004	Brujas	14	(4)
2005–2006	Cartaginés	21	(4)
2006	Luis Ángel Firpo		(14)
2007	Herediano	11	(2)
2007–2008	Carmelita	40	(13)
2009	ASODELI		
2009	Chimaltenango		
2010–2011	Limón	29	(0)
2011	Barrio Mexico		
2012	Paraíso Total		
2012–2013	Juventud Escazuceña		(20)
2013	Barrio Mexico		
2014	Halcones	18	(1)
2014–2015	AD Escazuceña		

International career^{‡}
1997–2007	Costa Rica	6	(0)
- * Club domestic league appearances and goals as of 1 January 2009 ‡ National team caps and goals as of 1 January 2012

David Angelo Diach Madrigal (born 7 June 1974) is a Costa Rican professional footballer who currently plays for Guatemalan side Halcones.

== Club career ==
Diach made his debut on 5 August 1995 for Costa Rican Second Division Vecinos and has played for several clubs in Costa Rica. He had spells with Trikala and Paniliakos in the Super League Greece during the 1999–2000 season, played in the second divisions in Brazil and China and for Brujas and Cartaginés whom he joined in January 2005.

He also had a brief spell with vision del 10 Luis Ángel Firpo in El Salvador where he scored 14 goals and with Antigua GFC in Guatemala.

He returned to Costa Rica, to play for Herediano until he joined Carmelita in June 2007. He joined América de Chimaltenango in Guatemala for the 2009–2010 season, but he returned to Costa Rica to play for Limón in January 2010.

In August 2013 he returned to Barrio Mexico after scoring 20 goals for fellow second division outfit Juventud Escazuceña in the 2012/13 season. In January 2014 Diach returned to Guatemala to play for Halcones.

== International career ==
Diach has made six appearances for the Costa Rica national football team, his debut coming in a qualifying match for the 1998 FIFA World Cup against Canada on November 16, 1997 which proved to be his sole FIFA competition match.

His final international was an October 2007 friendly match against Haiti.
