= Souleymane Keïta =

Malian footballer

Personal information
- Full name: Souleymane Keïta
- Date of birth: 24 November 1986 (age 39)
- Place of birth: Bamako, Mali
- Height: 1.85 m (6 ft 1 in)
- Position: Midfielder

Senior career*
Years	Team	Apps	(Gls)
2003–2004	Djoliba AC	36	(8)
2004–2005	Al-Jazira	16	(3)
2005–2007	ES Sétif	49	(6)
2007	AC Ajaccio	4	(0)
2007–2009	Al-Arabi		
2009–2010	Al-Kharitiyath	11	(0)
2010–2012	Sivasspor	25	(0)
2012–2013	Golden Arrows	4	(0)

International career
2010–2012	Mali	5	(0)
- * Club domestic league appearances and goals

Souleymane Keïta (born 24 November 1986) is a Malian former professional footballer who played as a midfielder.

== Career ==
Born in Bamako, Keïta started his career in Mali with local side Djoliba AC. After just one season with the senior team, he joined Emirati club Al-Jazira, where he stayed for just one season before leaving the club. In the summer of 2005 he joined Algerian club ES Sétif and instantly had an impact. In his first season, he was a main stay in the team starting line-up and helped the team finish fourth in the standings and earn a spot in next year's edition of the Arab Champions League. The 2006–07 season would be his most successful to date, helping ES Sétif win the Algerian League and the Arab Champions League.

=== Transfer dispute ===
After winning the 2007 Arab Champions League, he signed a contract with Qatari club Al-Arabi. However, just days later, he signed another contract with Ligue 2 side AC Ajaccio and chose to join them instead. After playing four games for AC Ajaccio, Al-Arabi pleaded their case to FIFA to regain the player and FIFA ruled in their favour, forcing the player to join Al-Arabi.

=== Sivasspor ===
On 27 December 2009, the 23-year-old midfielder left Al-Kharitiyath to join Süper Lig side Sivasspor on a two-year contract.

== Honours ==
ES Sétif

- Arab Champions League: 2007
- Algerian League: 2007

Mali

- Africa Cup of Nations bronze: 2012
