= Jim Will =

Scottish footballer

Personal information
- Full name: James Will
- Date of birth: 7 October 1972 (age 54)
- Place of birth: Turriff, Scotland
- Position: Goalkeeper

Youth career
- Arsenal

Senior career*
| Years | Team | Apps | (Gls) |
| 1991–1994 | Arsenal | 0 | (0) |
| 1991 | → Sheffield United (loan) | 0 | (0) |
| 1994–1995 | Dunfermline Athletic | 6 | (0) |
- Turriff United
- Deveronvale
- Turriff United
| 2007–2008 | Peterhead | 2 | (0) |
| Total | | 8 | (0) |

International career
| 1989 | Scotland under-16 | 6 | (0) |
| 1992–1993 | Scotland under-21 | 3 | (0) |
Medal record
Men's football
Representing Scotland
FIFA U-16 World Championship
| Runner-up | 1989 Scotland |
- * Club domestic league appearances and goals

James Will (born 7 October 1972) is a Scottish former professional football goalkeeper, who played for Arsenal, Dunfermline Athletic, Turriff United, Deveronvale and Peterhead.

Will played for Scotland youth national teams. He was the first choice goalkeeper as Scotland progressed to the final of the 1989 FIFA U-16 World Championship, which they lost on a penalty shootout to Saudi Arabia. Will won the player of the tournament award, having only conceded three goals in the competition. He later made three appearances for the Scotland under-21 team.

After leaving professional football, Will became a police officer in the Grampian force area.
