= América de Chimaltenango =

Guatemalan football club

- Full name: Club América de Chimaltenango
- Nickname(s): Los Cisnes
- Ground: Estadio Municipal de Chimaltenango, Chimaltenango, Guatemala
- Capacity: 1,500
- Manager: (Chile) Henry Barrientos
- League: Primera División de Ascenso
- 2010 Clausura Grupo A: 9th (relegated)

Club América de Chimaltenango, is a Guatemalan football club based in Chimaltenango, Chimaltenango Department. They play their home games in the Estadio Municipal de Chimaltenango.

== History ==
Nicknamed Los Cisnes (the Swans), the club has its roots in the club Rey América, who have been regional champions numerous times. They only made their debut in the national league in 2007, in the Tercera Division, and after two successive promotions started the 2009/2010 in the Primera División de Ascenso.

After finishing 9th in the 2009/2010 season in the second tier of Guatemalan football, they were relegated to the Segunda División, Group "E".

== Current squad ==
Note: Flags indicate national team as defined under FIFA eligibility rules; some limited exceptions apply. Players may hold more than one non-FIFA nationality.

No.	Pos.	Nation	Player
—	DF	(Guatemala) GUA	Allan Quinciño
—	DF	(Guatemala) GUA	Antonio Arévalo
—	MF	(Guatemala) GUA	Saul Reyes
—	MF	(Guatemala) GUA	Danilo Barrera
—	MF	(Guatemala) GUA	Didier Sagastume
—	MF	(Guatemala) GUA	Jefferson Zamora
—	FW	(Guatemala) GUA	Werner Durán
—	FW	(Costa Rica) CRC	David Diach
—		(Guatemala) GUA	Ever Ochaeta
—		(Costa Rica) CRC	Andrei Campos
—		(Guatemala) GUA	Carlos Godoy

No.	Pos.	Nation	Player
—		(Uruguay) URU	Fredy Cecilia
—		(Uruguay) URU	José Rocael Gonzalez
—		(Guatemala) GUA	Erick González
—		(Guatemala) GUA	Robin Argueta
—		(Guatemala) GUA	Wilmer Mendoza
—		(Guatemala) GUA	Cristián López
—		(Guatemala) GUA	Hugo Gutiérrez
—		(Guatemala) GUA	Edilsar Orozco
—		(Guatemala) GUA	Fredy Ruano
—		(Guatemala) GUA	Jorge Tubac
—		(Guatemala) GUA	Iván Gutiérrez

== List of coaches ==
- (Guatemala) Gabriel Castillo y Castillo (2009–10)
