= Baba Sule =

Ghanaian footballer

Personal information
- Full name: Baba Sulemaye
- Date of birth: 7 November 1978 (age 47)
- Place of birth: Kumasi, Ghana
- Height: 1.80 m (5 ft 11 in)
- Position: Midfielder

Senior career*
Years	Team	Apps	(Gls)
1994–1996	Cornerstones		
1996–1997	Mallorca	3	(0)
1997–1999	Ourense	44	(1)
1999–2004	Leganés	7	(0)
2004	Lleida	0	(0)
2005	Tomelloso	14	(0)
2005	San Isidro	9	(0)
2005–2006	Rapitenca		
2006–2007	Rayo Majadahonda		
2008–2010	Kwara United		
2010–2011	Niger Tornadoes		

International career
1995	Ghana U17	6	(0)
1997	Ghana U20	7	(0)
- * Club domestic league appearances and goals

Baba Sulemaye (born 7 November 1978), known as Baba Sule, is a Ghanaian former footballer who played as a midfielder.

== Club career ==
Born in Kumasi, Sule arrived in Spain not yet aged 18 from his hometown club Cornerstones FC, and proceeded to represent in the country RCD Mallorca, CD Ourense, CD Leganés, UE Lleida, Tomelloso CF, CD San Isidro, UE Rapitenca and CF Rayo Majadahonda in a stay that would last 11 years, in the Segunda División but also much lower, with very poor individual results: in 1996–97, he only played three times as Mallorca returned to La Liga; over five seasons, also in the second tier, he only made seven league appearances for Madrid-based CD Leganés due to two serious knee injuries.

In 2008, already with a Spanish passport, Sule moved back to Africa, signing with Nigerian team Kwara United FC. He returned to Spain after his retirement due to injuries, working as an electrician, David de Gea's personal driver – before the goalkeeper was eligible for a driving licence – and later a kit man for Segunda División B's CF Fuenlabrada.
