= Marco Antônio (footballer, born 1978) =

Brazilian footballer

Personal information
- Full name: Marco Antônio de Freitas Filho
- Date of birth: October 23, 1978 (age 48)
- Place of birth: Ribeirão Preto, São Paulo, Brazil
- Height: 1.75 m (5 ft 9 in)
- Positions: Winger; forward

Senior career*
| Years | Team | Apps | (Gls) |
| 1996–1998 | São Paulo | | |
| 1999–2000 | Náutico | | |
| 2001 | União Barbarense | | |
| 2002 | Ceará | | |
| 2003 | Fortaleza | | |
| 2004 | Atlético Mineiro | 5 | (0) |
| 2005 | Corinthians-AL | | |
| 2005–2006 | Jeonbuk Hyundai | 1 | (0) |
| 2006–2007 | Santa Cruz | | |
| 2007 | Iraklis | | |
| 2007–2008 | ABC | | |
| 2008 | Comercial-SP | | |
| 2008 | Anapolina | | |
| 2009 | Brasil de Pelotas | | |
| 2009–2010 | Rio Branco-AC | | |
| 2010–2011 | Venezia | 10 | (1) |
| 2011 | Unione 98 | | |
| 2011 | Botafogo-SP | | |

International career
| 1995 | Brazil U17 | | |
- * Club domestic league appearances and goals as of 20 August 2007

Marco Antônio de Freitas Filho (born October 23, 1978, in Ribeirão Preto, São Paulo), known as Marco Antônio, is a Brazilian former footballer, who played as a wing forward or as a forward. Played for Jeonbuk Hyundai in South Korea, Santa Cruz FC, Atlético Mineiro, Fortaleza, Ceará, União Barbarense, Náutico, São Paulo FC, FBC Unione Venezia in Italy (5th division) and Botafogo de Ribeirão Preto.

== Honours ==
Ceará SC

- Campeonato Cearense: 2002

Fortaleza EC

- Campeonato Cearense: 2003

Santa Cruz FC

- Campeonato Pernambucano: 2005

Brazil U17

- South American U-17 Championship: 1995
