= Henry Onwuzuruike =

Nigerian footballer

Personal information
- Full name: Henry Okwudili Onwuzuruike
- Date of birth: 26 December 1979 (age 46)
- Place of birth: Aba, Nigeria
- Height: 1.72 m (5 ft 8 in)
- Position: Midfielder

Youth career
- 1994–1995: NEPA Lagos
- 1996–1997: Jasper United

Senior career*
Years	Team	Apps	(Gls)
1997–1999	Heerenveen	14	(0)
1999–2001	Greuther Fürth	12	(0)
2001–2004	1. SC Feucht	77	(15)
2004–2006	Rot-Weiß Erfurt	43	(3)
2006–2008	TSV Crailsheim	53	(3)
2008–2010	SSV Ulm	35	(1)
2010–2012	Darmstadt 98	26	(1)
Total		260	(23)

International career
1998–2000	Nigeria	5	(0)
- * Club domestic league appearances and goals

Henry Okwudili Onwuzuruike (born 26 December 1979) is a Nigerian former professional footballer who played as a midfielder.

== Career ==
Onwuzuruike began his early career in his native Nigeria with NEPA Lagos and Jasper United, before playing in the Netherlands with Heerenveen. He later played in Germany for SpVgg Greuther Fürth, 1. SC Feucht, FC Rot-Weiß Erfurt, TSV Crailsheim and SSV Ulm 1846.

He also represented Nigeria at international level, and played at the 2000 Summer Olympics.
