= Dele Alampasu =

Nigerian footballer

Personal information
- Full name: Dele Sunday Alampasu
- Date of birth: 24 December 1996 (age 29)
- Place of birth: Abuja, Nigeria
- Height: 1.99 m (6 ft 6 1/2 in)
- Position: Goalkeeper

Team information
- Current team: Jura Dolois
- Number: 1

Youth career
- 2011–2012: Future Stars Academy
- 2012–2013: Abuja Football College

Senior career*
Years	Team	Apps	(Gls)
2015–2020	Feirense	1	(0)
2016–2017	→ Cesarense (loan)	1	(0)
2020–2021	Ventspils	6	(0)
2022–2022	FK Jelgava	0	(0)
2022–2023	Pietà Hotspurs	11	(0)
2023–	Jura Dolois	0	(0)

International career
2013–2015	Nigeria U17	7	(0)
2017–	Nigeria	1	(0)
Medal record
Representing Nigeria
Men's Football
FIFA U-17 World Cup
Winner	2013 United Arab Emirates
- * Club domestic league appearances and goals

Dele Sunday Alampasu (born 24 December 1996) is a Nigerian professional footballer who plays for Jura Dolois in the Championnat National 3, as a goalkeeper.

== Club career ==
Alampasu began his career in Nigeria, playing in the Lagos State Football Association Future Stars Academy and for Abuja Football College. Alampasu underwent trials with Real Oviedo, Genk and Braga before signing for Portuguese club Estoril in February 2015. Alampasu cancelled his contract with Estoril, due to visa problems, and subsequently signed for Feirense.

In August 2016, Alampasu signed for Cesarense on loan. On 20 January 2019, Alampasu made his debut for Feirense in a 0–0 draw against Rio Ave.

In February 2020, Alampasu signed for Latvian club Ventspils.

== International career ==
In 2013, Alampasu represented Nigeria U17 at the 2013 FIFA U-17 World Cup, winning the Golden Glove award, as the Golden Eaglets won their fourth U17 World Cup.

On 1 June 2017, Alampasu made his senior debut for Nigeria, as a 70th minute substitution, against Togo in a 3–0 victory.

== Honours ==
Nigeria U17

- FIFA U-17 World Cup: 2013

Individual

- FIFA U-17 World Cup Golden Glove: 2013
