= Adrian Sarkissian =

Uruguayan footballer (born 1979)

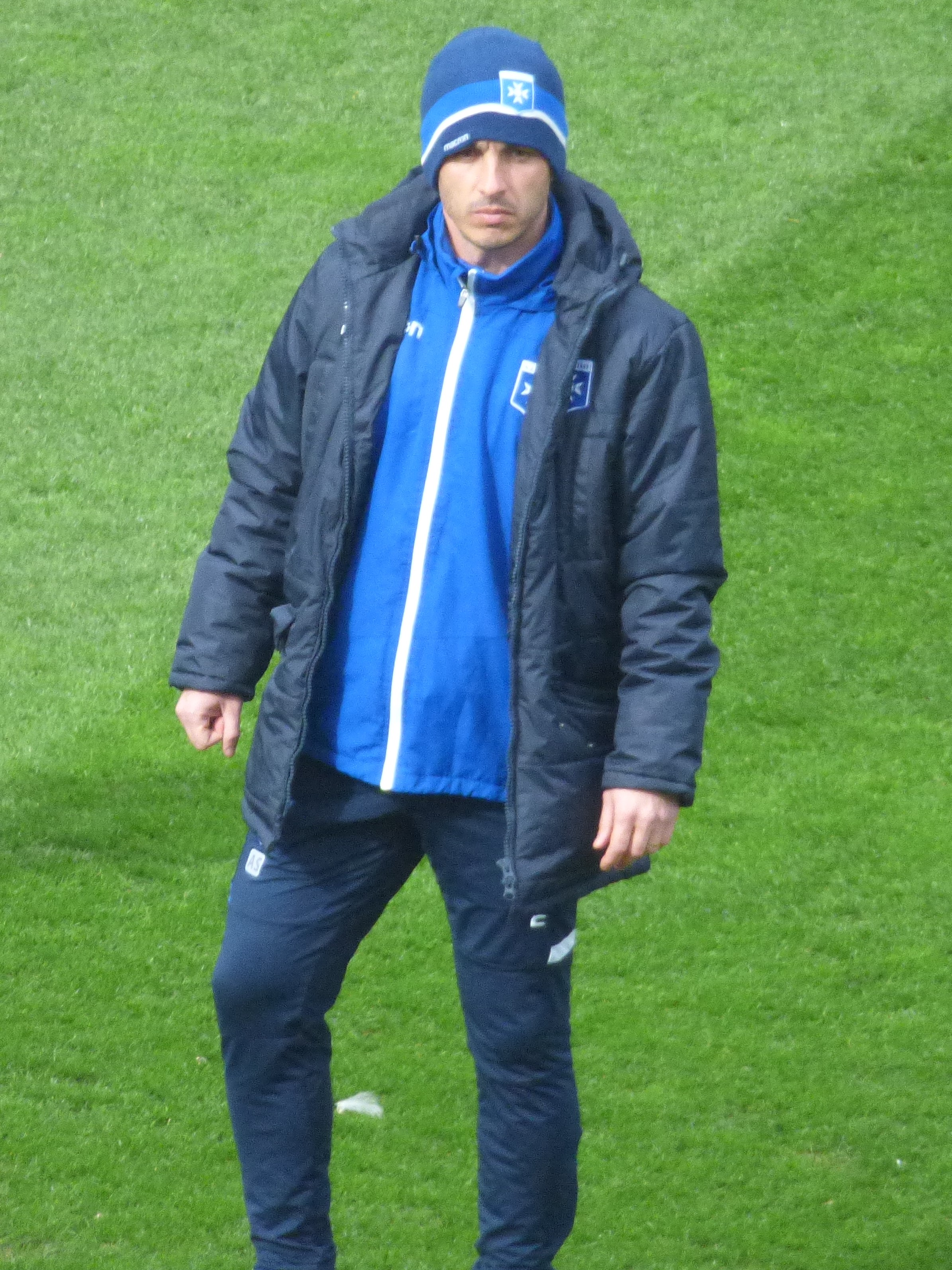
- Sarkissian in 2019

Personal information
- Full name: Carlos Adrián Sarkissian Balerio
- Date of birth: 13 February 1979 (age 47)
- Place of birth: Montevideo, Uruguay
- Height: 1.77 m (5 ft 10 in)
- Positions: Midfielder; winger

Senior career*
Years	Team	Apps	(Gls)
1997–2001	CA River Plate		
2001–2003	Veracruz		
2003–2005	CA River Plate		
2004–2005	Al-Ahli (Jeddah)		
2005–2008	Nancy	35	(2)
- * Club domestic league appearances and goals

Carlos Adrián Sarkissian Balerio (born 13 February 1979) is a Uruguayan former professional footballer who played as a midfielder or winger.

== Career ==
Born in Montevideo, Sarkissian began his career with River Plate de Montevideo, and had a spell with C.D. Veracruz in Mexico. He last played for AS Nancy-Lorraine in France's Ligue 1.

== Honours ==
Nancy

- Coupe de la Ligue: 2005–06
