= Paul Argney =

French footballer (born 2006)

Personal information
- Full name: Paul Antoine Robin Stanislas Argney
- Date of birth: 23 May 2006 (age 20)
- Place of birth: Granville, France
- Height: 1.86 m (6 ft 1 in)
- Position: Goalkeeper

Team information
- Current team: Le Havre
- Number: 50

Youth career
- 2013-2017: AS Jullouville-Sartilly
- 2017–2021: US Avranches
- 2021–2023: Le Havre

Senior career*
Years	Team	Apps	(Gls)
2023–2024	Le Havre II	17	(0)
2024–	Le Havre	1	(0)
2025	→ Francs Borains (loan)	1	(0)

International career^{‡}
2022	France U16	4	(0)
2022–2023	France U17	17	(0)
2023	France U18	2	(0)
2024–	France U19	6	(0)
Medal record
Men's football
Representing France
FIFA U-17 World Cup
Runner-up	2023
UEFA European Under-17 Championship
Runner-up	2023
- * Club domestic league appearances and goals as of 4 January 2026 ‡ National team caps and goals as of 19 March 2025

Paul Antoine Robin Stanislas Argney (born 23 May 2006) is a French professional footballer who plays as a goalkeeper for Ligue 1 club Le Havre.

== Club career ==
Born in Granville, Manche, Argney is a youth product of AS Jullouville Sartilly, US Avranches and Le Havre.

Argney joined Le Havre's reserve team in summer 2023, making his senior debut in a 3–1 Championnat National 3 win over AS Villers-Houlgate on 26 August 2023.

On 3 February 2025, Argney joined Belgian club Francs Borains in the Challenger Pro League on loan until the end of the season.

== International career ==
Argney is a youth international for France, having played for the under-16s and under-17s.

With France U17s he was a standout in both the 2023 European Championship and the following World Cup, where his team twice reached the final, earning the golden glove award in the latter.

== Career statistics ==
As of match played 4 January 2026

Appearances and goals by club, season and competition
Club	Season	League			Cup		Other		Total	
Club	Season	Division	Apps	Goals	Apps	Goals	Apps	Goals	Apps	Goals
Le Havre II	2023–24	National 3	17	0	—		—		17	0
Le Havre	2023–24	Ligue 1	0	0	0	0	—		0	0
Le Havre	2025–26	Ligue 1	0	0	1	0	—		1	0
Le Havre	Total		0	0	1	0	—		1	0
Francs Borains (loan)	2024–25	Challenger Pro League	1	0	—		—		1	0
Career total			18	0	1	0	0	0	19	0

== Honours ==
France U17

- UEFA European Under-17 Championship runner-up: 2023
- FIFA U-17 World Cup runner-up: 2023

Individual

- FIFA U-17 World Cup Golden Glove: 2023
