= FIFA U-17 World Cup =

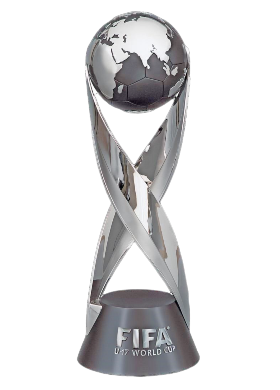
- The trophy awarded since 2007 (with current name); since 2005 (by design)
- Organiser(s): FIFA
- Founded: 1985; 41 years ago
- Region: International
- Teams: 48 (finals)
- Related competitions: FIFA U-17 Women's World Cup; FIFA U-20 World Cup
- Current champions: Portugal (1st title)
- Most championships: Nigeria (5 titles)
- Website: fifa.com/u17worldcup
- 2026 FIFA U-17 World Cup

The FIFA U-17 World Cup, founded as the FIFA U-16 World Championship, later changed to U-17 in 1991 and to its current name in 2007, is the annual world championship of association football for male players with the age of up to 17 organized by Fédération Internationale de Football Association (FIFA). The reigning champions are Portugal, who won their first title at the 2025 tournament.

== History ==
The tournament was inspired by the Lion City Cup that was created by the Football Association of Singapore in 1977. The Lion City Cup was the first under-16 football tournament in the world. Following FIFA's then secretary-general Sepp Blatter's recommendation after he was in Singapore for the 1982 Lion City Cup, FIFA created the FIFA U-16 World Championship.

The first edition was staged in 1985 in China, and tournaments have been played every two years since then. It began as a competition for players under the age of 16, with the age limit raised to 17 from the 1991 edition onward. The 2017 tournament, which was hosted by India, became the most attended in the history of the tournament, with the total attendance of the FIFA U-17 World Cup reaching 1,347,133.

Nigeria is the most successful nation in the tournament's history, with five titles and three runners up. Brazil is the second-most successful with four titles and two runners-up. Ghana and Mexico have each won the tournament twice.

A corresponding tournament for female players, the FIFA U-17 Women's World Cup, began in 2008, with North Korea winning the inaugural tournament.

In March 2024, FIFA announced that both sexes' U-17 World Cups would be held annually, with Qatar and Morocco hosting the first five annual tournaments starting in 2025. For the U-17 World Cup, the tournament was also expanded to a 48-team format, having previously been held as a biennial 24-team tournament from 2007 to 2023.

In November 2025, Morocco recorded the largest winning margin in the history of any 11-a-side FIFA World Cup tournament, defeating New Caledonia 16–0 at the 2025 FIFA U-17 World Cup.

== Structure ==
Each tournament consists of a group phase, in which four teams play against one another and standings in the group table decide which teams advance, followed by a knockout phase of successive matches where the winning team advances through the competition and the losing team is eliminated. This continues until two teams remain to contest the final, which decides the tournament winner. The losing semi-finalists also contest a match to decide third place.

From 1985 to 2005 there were 16 teams in the competition, divided into four groups of four teams each in the group phase. Each team played the others in its group and the group winner and runner up qualified for the knockout phase. From 2007 the tournament was expanded to 24 teams, divided into six groups of four teams each. The top 2 places in each group plus the four best third-placed teams advanced to the knockout phase.

Competition matches are played in two 45-minute halves (i.e., 90 minutes in total). In the knockout phase, until the 2011 tournament, if tied at the end of 90 minutes an additional 30 minutes of extra time were played, followed by a penalty shoot-out if still tied. Starting with the 2011 tournament, the extra time period was eliminated to avoid player burnout, and all knockout games progress straight to penalties if tied at the end of 90 minutes.

From 2025 the tournament will take place annually and will have 48 participating teams divided into 12 groups of 4 teams, with the top two teams from each group (24 teams) and the eight best third-placed teams advance to the knockout stage, starting at the round of 32 all the way to the final to decide the winners. Qatar was announced as host country from 2025 to 2029 on 14 March 2024.

== Qualification ==
The host nation of each tournament qualifies automatically. The remaining teams qualify through competitions organised by the six regional confederations. For the first edition of the tournament in 1985, all of the teams from Europe plus Bolivia appeared by invitation of FIFA.

Confederation	Championship
AFC (Asia)	AFC U-17 Asian Cup
CAF (Africa)	U-17 Africa Cup of Nations
CONCACAF (North, Central America and Caribbean)	CONCACAF Under-17 Championship
CONMEBOL (South America)	South American Under-17 Championship
OFC (Oceania)	OFC U-16 Championship
UEFA (Europe)	UEFA European Under-17 Championship (Qualifiers)

== Results ==
Tournament names

- 1985–1989: FIFA U-16 World Championship
- 1991–2005: FIFA U-17 World Championship
- 2007–present: FIFA U-17 World Cup

Keys

- a.e.t.: after extra time
- p: penalty shoot-out

Ed.	Year	Hosts	Final			Third place game			Num. teams
Ed.	Year	Hosts	(gold) Champions	Score	(silver) Runners-up	(bronze) Third place	Score	Fourth place	Num. teams
1	1985	China	Nigeria	2–0	West Germany	Brazil	4–1	Guinea	16
2	1987	Canada	Soviet Union	1–1 (a.e.t.) (4–2 p)	Nigeria	Ivory Coast	2–1 (a.e.t.)	Italy	16
3	1989	Scotland	Saudi Arabia	2–2 (a.e.t.) (5–4 p)	Scotland	Portugal	3–0	Bahrain	16
4	1991	Italy	Ghana	1–0	Spain	Argentina	1–1 (a.e.t.) (4–1 p)	Qatar	16
5	1993	Japan	Nigeria	2–1	Ghana	Chile	1–1 (a.e.t.) (4–2 p)	Poland	16
6	1995	Ecuador	Ghana	3–2	Brazil	Argentina	2–0	Oman	16
7	1997	Egypt	Brazil	2–1	Ghana	Spain	2–1	Germany	16
8	1999	New Zealand	Brazil	0–0 (a.e.t.) (8–7 p)	Australia	Ghana	2–0	United States	16
9	2001	Trinidad and Tobago	France	3–0	Nigeria	Burkina Faso	2–0	Argentina	16
10	2003	Finland	Brazil	1–0	Spain	Argentina	1–1 (a.e.t.) (5–4 p)	Colombia	16
11	2005	Peru	Mexico	3–0	Brazil	Netherlands	2–1	Turkey	16
12	2007	South Korea	Nigeria	0–0 (a.e.t.) (3–0 p)	Spain	Germany	2–1	Ghana	24
13	2009	Nigeria	Switzerland	1–0	Nigeria	Spain	1–0	Colombia	24
14	2011	Mexico	Mexico	2–0	Uruguay	Germany	4–3	Brazil	24
15	2013	United Arab Emirates	Nigeria	3–0	Mexico	Sweden	4–1	Argentina	24
16	2015	Chile	Nigeria	2–0	Mali	Belgium	3–2	Mexico	24
17	2017	India	England	5–2	Spain	Brazil	2–0	Mali	24
18	2019	Brazil	Brazil	2–1	Mexico	France	3–1	Netherlands	24
19	2023	Indonesia	Germany	2–2 (4–3 p)	France	Mali	3–0	Argentina	24
20	2025	Qatar	Portugal	1–0	Austria	Italy	0–0 (4–2 p)	Brazil	48
21	2026	Qatar							48
22	2027	Qatar							48
23	2028	Qatar							48
24	2029	Qatar							48

== Teams reaching the top four ==
Team	Title(s)	Runners-up	Third place	Fourth place
Nigeria	5 (1985, 1993, 2007, 2013, 2015)	3 (1987, 2001, 2009)		
Brazil	4 (1997, 1999, 2003, 2019)	2 (1995, 2005)	2 (1985, 2017)	2 (2011, 2025)
Ghana	2 (1991, 1995)	2 (1993, 1997)	1 (1999)	1 (2007)
Mexico	2 (2005, 2011)	2 (2013, 2019)		1 (2015)
Germany^{1}	1 (2023)	1 (1985)	2 (2007, 2011)	1 (1997)
France	1 (2001)	1 (2023)	1 (2019)	
Portugal	1 (2025)		1 (1989)	
Russia^{2}	1 (1987)			
Saudi Arabia	1 (1989)			
Switzerland	1 (2009)			
England	1 (2017)			
Spain		4 (1991, 2003, 2007, 2017)	2 (1997, 2009)	
Mali		1 (2015)	1 (2023)	1 (2017)
Scotland		1 (1989)		
Australia		1 (1999)		
Uruguay		1 (2011)		
Austria		1 (2025)		
Argentina			3 (1991, 1995, 2003)	3 (2001, 2013, 2023)
Netherlands			1 (2005)	1 (2019)
Italy			1 (2025)	1 (1987)
Ivory Coast			1 (1987)	
Chile			1 (1993)	
Burkina Faso			1 (2001)	
Sweden			1 (2013)	
Belgium			1 (2015)	
Colombia				2 (2003, 2009)
Guinea				1 (1985)
Bahrain				1 (1989)
Qatar				1 (1991)
Poland				1 (1993)
Oman				1 (1995)
United States				1 (1999)
Turkey				1 (2005)

^{1} includes results representing West Germany (1985)
^{2} includes results achieved by the Soviet Union national under-16 football team prior to the dissolution of the Soviet Union in 1991. These results belong to the Soviet Union and are not attributable to the Russian Soviet Federative Socialist Republic, Russia or Russian Federation.

=== Performances by continental zones ===
Africa is the most successful continental zone with seven tournament wins (five titles for Nigeria and two titles for Ghana) and six times as runner-up. Notably the 1993 final was contested by two African teams, which was the first time the final had been contested by two teams from the same confederation. in 2015, a pair of African teams repeated the 1993 final with Mali replacing Ghana (disqualified for age violation), when Nigeria and Mali made it to the last two standing and Nigeria got their fifth win.

Europe has six tournaments wins (one title each for the Soviet Union, France, Switzerland, England, Germany and Portugal) and has been runner-up eight times. Spain has been runner-up on four occasions. Additionally Netherlands, Sweden and Italy have won third-place medals in 2005, 2013, and 2025 respectively.

South America has four tournament wins–all by Brazil—and has been runners-up three times, Uruguay also finished runner-up once, in 2011. On the other hand, Argentina has finished in third place on three occasions; Chile has done so on one occasion; and Colombia has finished in fourth place twice, but neither of the latter three have ever appeared in the final.

The CONCACAF zone has two tournament wins (won by Mexico in 2005 and 2011). This confederation has reached the final four times (with Mexico).

Asia has one tournament win (won by Saudi Arabia in 1989), the only time that a team from this confederation has reached the final and the only time an Asian team won a FIFA tournament in the male category. (Australia was runner-up in 1999 but at that time was in the Oceania Football Confederation).

Oceania has no tournament wins and on one occasion was runners-up (Australia in 1999). Australia has since moved to the Asian confederation.

This tournament is peculiar in that the majority of titles have gone to teams from outside the strongest regional confederations (CONMEBOL and UEFA). Of the 20 editions held so far, 10 (50 percent of the total) have been won by teams from Africa, Asia, and North America.

Confederation (continent)	Performances			
Confederation (continent)	Champions	Runners-up	Third place	Fourth place
CAF (Africa)	7 times: Nigeria (5), Ghana (2)	6 times: Nigeria (3), Ghana (2), Mali (1)	4 times: Ghana (1), Ivory Coast (1), Burkina Faso (1), Mali (1)	3 times: Ghana (1), Guinea (1), Mali (1)
UEFA (Europe)	6 times: France (1), Soviet Union (1), Switzerland (1), England (1), Germany (1), Portugal (1)	8 times: Spain (4), Germany (1), Scotland (1), France (1), Austria (1)	10 times: Germany (2), Spain (2), Belgium (1), France (1), Italy (1), Netherlands (1), Portugal (1), Sweden (1)	5 times: Germany (1), Italy (1), Netherlands (1), Poland (1), Turkey (1)
CONMEBOL (South America)	4 times: Brazil (4)	3 times: Brazil (2), Uruguay (1)	6 times: Argentina (3), Brazil (2), Chile (1)	7 times: Brazil (2), Argentina (3), Colombia (2)
CONCACAF (North America)	2 times: Mexico (2)	2 times: Mexico (2)	None	2 times: Mexico (1), United States (1)
AFC (Asia)	1 time: Saudi Arabia (1)	None	None	3 times: Bahrain (1), Qatar (1), Oman (1)
OFC (Oceania)	None	1 time: Australia (1)	None	None

== Awards ==
The following awards are now presented:

- The Golden Ball is awarded to the most valuable player of the tournament;
- The Golden Boot is awarded to the top goalscorer of the tournament;
- The Golden Glove is awarded to the most valuable goalkeeper of the tournament;
- The FIFA Fair Play Trophy is presented to the team with the best disciplinary record in the tournament.

Tournament	Golden Ball	Golden Boot	Goals	Golden Glove	FIFA Fair Play Trophy
1985 China	(Brazil) William	(West Germany) Marcel Witeczek	8	Not awarded	West Germany
1987 Canada	(Nigeria) Philip Osundu	(Ivory Coast) Moussa Traoré	5	Not awarded	Soviet Union
1989 Scotland	(Scotland) James Will	(Guinea) Fode Camara	3	Not awarded	Bahrain
1991 Italy	(Ghana) Nii Lamptey	(Brazil) Adriano	4	Not awarded	Argentina
1993 Japan	(Ghana) Daniel Addo	(Nigeria) Wilson Oruma	6	Not awarded	Nigeria
1995 Ecuador	(Oman) Mohammed Al-Kathiri	(Australia) Daniel Allsopp	5	Not awarded	Brazil
1997 Egypt	(Spain) Sergio Santamaría	(Spain) David	7	Not awarded	Argentina
1999 New Zealand	(United States) Landon Donovan	(Ghana) Ishmael Addo	7	Not awarded	Mexico
2001 Trinidad and Tobago	(France) Florent Sinama Pongolle	(France) Florent Sinama Pongolle	9	Not awarded	Nigeria
2003 Finland	(Spain) Cesc Fàbregas	(Spain) Cesc Fàbregas	5	Not awarded	Costa Rica
2005 Peru	(Brazil) Anderson	(Mexico) Carlos Vela	5	Not awarded	North Korea
2007 South Korea	(Germany) Toni Kroos	(Nigeria) Macauley Chrisantus	7	Not awarded	Costa Rica
2009 Nigeria	(Nigeria) Sani Emmanuel	(Spain) Borja	5	(Switzerland) Benjamin Siegrist	Nigeria
2011 Mexico	(Mexico) Julio Gómez	(Ivory Coast) Souleymane Coulibaly	9	(Uruguay) Jonathan Cubero	Japan
2013 United Arab Emirates	(Nigeria) Kelechi Iheanacho	(Sweden) Valmir Berisha	7	(Nigeria) Dele Alampasu	Nigeria
2015 Chile	(Nigeria) Kelechi Nwakali	(Nigeria) Victor Osimhen	10	(Mali) Samuel Diarra	Ecuador
2017 India	(England) Phil Foden	(England) Rhian Brewster	8	(Brazil) Gabriel Brazão	Brazil
2019 Brazil	(Brazil) Gabriel Veron	(Netherlands) Sontje Hansen	6	(Brazil) Matheus Donelli	Ecuador
2023 Indonesia	(Germany) Paris Brunner	(Argentina) Agustín Ruberto	8	(France) Paul Argney	England
2025 Qatar	(Portugal) Mateus Mide	(Austria) Johannes Moser	8	(Portugal) Romário Cunha	Czech Republic
2026 Qatar					
2027 Qatar					
2028 Qatar					
2029 Qatar					

== See also ==
- List of association football competitions
- FIFA U-20 World Cup
- FIFA U-17 Women's World Cup
