= Estadio Olímpico de Ibarra =

Multi-use stadium in Ibarra, Ecuador

Estadio Olímpico
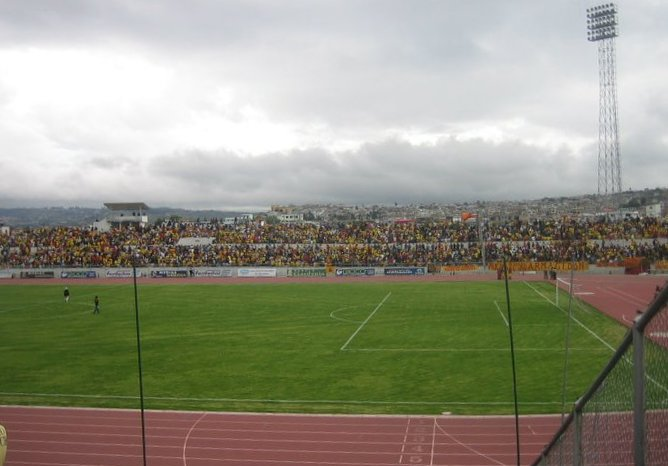
- En ibarra
- Interactive map of Estadio Olímpico
- Full name: Estadio Olímpico Ciudad de Ibarra
- Former names: Estadio Olímpico Municipal; Estadio Olímpico "Ciudad de Ibarra"
- Location: Avenida Víctor Manuel Peñaherrera S/N y Jaime Roldós; Ibarra, Ecuador
- Coordinates: 0.36021°N 78.11853°W
- Owner: Federación Deportiva de Imbabura
- Operator: Federación Deportiva de Imbabura
- Capacity: 18,600
- Field size: 100 x 66 m

Construction
- Opened: August 4, 1988
- Renovated: August 4, 1995

Tenant
- Imbabura

Estadio Olímpico de Ibarra (English: Ibarra Olympic Stadium) is a multi-use stadium in Ibarra, Ecuador. It is currently used mostly for football matches and is the home stadium of Imbabura Sporting Club of the Serie A de Ecuador. The stadium holds 18,600 spectators and opened in 1988.
