= Mohammed Amar Al-Kathiri =

Omani footballer (born 1978)

Mohammed Al-Kathiri
Personal information
- Full name: Mohammed Amar Al-Kathiri
- Date of birth: 7 December 1978 (age 47)
- Place of birth: Salalah, Oman
- Position: Midfielder

Senior career*
Years	Team	Apps	(Gls)
- Al-Nasr
- Mirbat

International career
- Oman U17
- Oman
- * Club domestic league appearances and goals

Mohammed Amar Al-Kathiri (Arabic: محمد عامر الكثيري; born 7 December 1978) is an Omani former footballer.

== Career ==
Al-Kathiri is originally from Salalah, Oman. He was awarded the Asian Young Footballer of the Year prize by the Asian Football Confederation (AFC) in 1995. He also played at the 1995 FIFA U-17 World Championship and won the Golden Ball award for the Most Valuable Player.

During his club career, Al-Kathiri played for his hometown club, Al-Nasr, in addition to Mirbat.
