= 1995 FIFA U-17 World Championship squads =

== Group A ==
=== Ecuador ===
Head coach: (Bolivia) Eduardo Rivero Aviles

No.	Pos.	Player	Date of birth (age)	Caps	Club
1	GK	Edwin Villafuerte	12 March 1979 (aged 16)		(Ecuador) Barcelona SC
2	DF	Félix Angulo	14 November 1978 (aged 16)		(Ecuador) Centro Juvenil Deportivo
3	DF	Eduardo Benítez	7 July 1979 (aged 16)		(Ecuador) Escuela Ecuafutbol
4	DF	Moisés Candelario	24 August 1978 (aged 16)		(Ecuador) Escuela Asociacion Guayas
5	DF	Exon Corozo	13 November 1978 (aged 16)		(Ecuador) San Pedro de Cayambe
6	DF	José Estrada	2 August 1978 (aged 17)		(Ecuador) Calvi Futbol Club
7	FW	Freddy Ferreira	14 January 1978 (aged 17)		(Ecuador) Barcelona SC
8	MF	Carlos García	24 September 1978 (aged 16)		(Ecuador) Escuela Ecuafutbol
9	FW	Diego Ayala	8 June 1979 (aged 16)		(Ecuador) Calvi Futbol Club
10	MF	Carlos Hidalgo	9 February 1979 (aged 16)		(Ecuador) Emelec CS
11	FW	Víctor Mercado	24 August 1978 (aged 16)		(Ecuador) Escuela Ecuafutbol
12	GK	Julio Guzmán	23 February 1979 (aged 16)		(Ecuador) Escuela Ecuafutbol
13	MF	Luis Moreira	23 September 1978 (aged 16)		(Ecuador) Escuela Ecuafutbol
14	MF	Jairo Montaño	9 July 1979 (aged 16)		(Ecuador) Escuela Ecuafutbol
15	MF	Manuel Palacios	27 August 1978 (aged 16)		(Ecuador) El Nacional
16	MF	Jefferson Pesantes	21 October 1978 (aged 16)		(Ecuador) Escuela Ecuafutbol
17	FW	Víctor Preciado	29 December 1978 (aged 16)		(Ecuador) Escuela Ecuafutbol
18	MF	Giancarlo Ramos	2 September 1978 (aged 16)		(Ecuador) Escuela Asociacion Guayas

=== United States ===
Head coach: (United States) Glenn Myernick

No.	Pos.	Player	Date of birth (age)	Caps	Club
1	GK	Nick Rimando	17 June 1979 (aged 16)		(United States) Arsenal Alta Loma
2	DF	Jorge Remond	14 March 1978 (aged 17)		(United States) Greensboro Bucs
3	DF	Joshua Norkus	14 March 1979 (aged 16)		(United States) Releigh Caps Gree
4	DF	Joel Reddington	15 July 1979 (aged 16)		(United States) Dallas Texans
5	DF	Mike Potempa	27 February 1979 (aged 16)		(United States) Columbia City United
6	DF	Nick Garcia	9 April 1979 (aged 16)		(United States) Dallas Texans
7	MF	Grover Gibson	18 November 1978 (aged 16)		(United States) Braddock Road Eagle
8	MF	Steve Sosa	8 September 1978 (aged 16)		(United States) Marin Dixie Stompe
9	FW	Carl Bussey	11 October 1978 (aged 16)		(United States) Dallas Texans
10	MF	Francisco Gomez	25 January 1979 (aged 16)		(Bolivia) Academia Tahuichi
11	FW	Matt Laycock	22 January 1979 (aged 16)		(United States) Columbia City United
12	FW	Stephen Pedicini	25 January 1979 (aged 16)		(United States) Commack United
13	DF	Kevin Knott	26 April 1979 (aged 16)		(United States) Beach FC
14	MF	Miles Romm	20 September 1978 (aged 16)		(United States) Nether Providence
15	MF	Ryan Trout	9 November 1978 (aged 16)		(United States) Nether Providence
16	DF	Matt Thompson	7 December 1978 (aged 16)		(United States) BC Eagles
17	MF	Douglas Deken	3 December 1978 (aged 16)		(United States) Ohio Premier
18	GK	Tim Howard C	6 March 1979 (aged 16)		(United States) Jersey Cosmos

=== Ghana ===
Head coach: (Ghana) Samuel Arday

No.	Pos.	Player	Date of birth (age)	Caps	Club
1	GK	Michael Abu	26 December 1978 (aged 16)		(Ghana) Okwahu United
2	DF	Kwaku Kyere	1 October 1979 (aged 15)		(Ghana) Asante Kotoko
3	FW	Bashiru Gambo	24 September 1978 (aged 16)		(Ghana) King Faisal Babes
4	MF	Stephen Appiah	24 December 1980 (aged 14)		(Ghana) Hearts Of Oak
5	DF	Patrick Allotey	13 September 1978 (aged 16)		(Ghana) Sagroos Accra
6	DF	Attakora Amaniampong	1 September 1978 (aged 16)		(Ghana) Gapoha Readers
7	MF	Dini Kamara	13 August 1978 (aged 16)		(Ghana) Goldfields Obuasi
8	MF	Joseph Ansah	5 November 1978 (aged 16)		(Ghana) Afienya
9	FW	Abu Iddrisu	4 February 1979 (aged 16)		(Ghana) RTU
10	MF	Emanuel Bentil	3 December 1978 (aged 16)		(Ghana) Okwawu United
11	FW	David Amoako	21 September 1978 (aged 16)		(Ghana) Olympics
12	MF	Awudu Issaka	26 June 1979 (aged 16)		(Ghana) Prampram Mighty Royals
13	DF	Christian Gyan	2 November 1978 (aged 16)		(Ghana) Gapoha Readers
14	MF	Baba Sule	7 November 1978 (aged 16)		(Ghana) Comerstones Kumasi
15	DF	Christian Saba	29 December 1978 (aged 16)		(Ghana) Comerstones Kumasi
16	GK	Raymond Fenny	5 August 1979 (aged 15)		(Ghana) Hearts Of Oak
17	MF	Charles Akwei	9 January 1979 (aged 16)		(Ghana) Olympics
18	DF	Richard Ackon	10 October 1978 (aged 16)		(Ghana) Ebusua Dwarfs

=== Japan ===
Head coach: (Japan) Tamotsu Matsuda

No.	Pos.	Player	Date of birth (age)	Caps	Club
1	GK	Gen Nakamura	6 September 1978 (aged 16)		(Japan) Yokkaichi Chuo Kogyo High School
2	DF	Masahiro Koga	8 September 1978 (aged 17)		(Japan) Higashi Fukuoka High School
3	DF	Kyosuke Yoshikawa	8 November 1978 (aged 16)		(Japan) Funabashi Ichiritsu High School
4	DF	Takuya Kawaguchi	11 October 1978 (aged 16)		(Japan) Sapporo Shiroishi High School
5	MF	Tomoyuki Sakai	29 June 1979 (aged 16)		(Japan) JEF United Ichihara
6	DF	Yusuke Nakatani	22 September 1978 (aged 16)		(Japan) Nara Ikuei High School
7	MF	Hisaaki Kobayashi	20 September 1978 (aged 16)		(Japan) Shimizu Shogyo High School
8	DF	Toru Araiba	12 July 1979 (aged 16)		(Japan) Gamba Osaka
9	FW	Masaya Nishitani	16 September 1978 (aged 16)		(Japan) Hokuyo High School
10	FW	Kotaro Yamazaki	19 October 1978 (aged 16)		(Japan) Shimizu Higashi High School
11	FW	Hiroaki Tanaka	17 April 1979 (aged 16)		(Japan) Verdy Kawasaki
12	DF	Shigeki Tsujimoto	23 June 1979 (aged 16)		(Japan) Kindai University High School
13	MF	Junichi Inamoto	18 September 1979 (aged 15)		(Japan) Gamba Osaka
14	MF	Shinji Ono	27 September 1979 (aged 15)		(Japan) Shimizu Shogyo High School
15	DF	Jun Ideguchi	14 May 1979 (aged 16)		(Japan) Toko Gakuen High School
16	FW	Naohiro Takahara	4 June 1979 (aged 16)		(Japan) Shimizu Higashi High School
17	MF	Yuya Itabashi	16 July 1979 (aged 16)		(Japan) Maebashi Ikuei High School
18	GK	Yuji Nakagawa	22 October 1978 (aged 16)		(Japan) Kunimi High School

== Group B ==
=== Argentina ===
Head coach: (Argentina) José Pekerman

No.	Pos.	Player	Date of birth (age)	Caps	Club
1	GK	Daniel Islas	19 February 1979 (aged 16)		(Argentina) Argentinos Juniors
2	DF	Diego Trotta	11 February 1979 (aged 16)		(Argentina) Vélez Sarsfield
3	DF	Sebastián Martino	4 August 1978 (aged 16)		(Argentina) Newells Old Boys
4	DF	Facundo Elfand	22 March 1979 (aged 16)		(Argentina) Argentinos Juniors
5	DF	Leandro Ávila	12 January 1979 (aged 16)		(Argentina) Independiente
6	MF	Esteban Cambiasso	18 August 1980 (aged 14)		(Argentina) Argentinos Juniors
7	FW	Fernando Gatti	17 October 1978 (aged 16)		(Argentina) Gimnasia y Esgrima La Plata
8	MF	Aldo Duscher	22 March 1979 (aged 16)		(Argentina) Newell's Old Boys
9	MF	Sixto Peralta	16 April 1979 (aged 16)		(Argentina) Huracán
10	FW	César La Paglia	25 February 1979 (aged 16)		(Argentina) Argentinos Juniors
11	MF	Pablo Aimar C	3 November 1979 (aged 15)		(Argentina) River Plate
12	GK	Mariano Curieses	3 August 1980 (aged 15)		(Argentina) Boca Juniors
13	DF	Alfredo Torres	19 July 1979 (aged 16)		(Argentina) Huracán
14	DF	Carlos Roldán	12 September 1979 (aged 15)		(Argentina) Lanús
15	DF	Fabián Cubero	21 December 1978 (aged 16)		(Argentina) Renato Casarin
16	MF	Bruno Calabria	29 April 1979 (aged 16)		(Argentina) San Lorenzo de Almagro
17	MF	Sergio Caruso	14 January 1979 (aged 16)		(Argentina) Club Atletico Velez Sarsfield
18	FW	Luís Caserío	10 April 1979 (aged 16)		(Argentina) Boca Juniors

=== Portugal ===
Head coach: (Portugal) Rui Caçador

No.	Pos.	Player	Date of birth (age)	Caps	Club
1	GK	Márcio Santos	5 May 1979 (aged 16)		(Portugal) Sporting CP
2	FW	Zeferino	27 August 1978 (aged 16)		(Portugal) Porto
3	DF	André Correia	9 February 1979 (aged 16)		(Portugal) Porto
4	DF	Brito	30 August 1978 (aged 16)		(Portugal) Porto
5	MF	Vítor Pereira	27 August 1978 (aged 16)		(Portugal) Braga
6	MF	Adolfo	23 August 1978 (aged 16)		(Portugal) Porto
7	DF	Miguel Costa	4 September 1978 (aged 16)		(Portugal) Porto
8	MF	Ricardo Aires	9 September 1978 (aged 16)		(Portugal) Belenenses
9	FW	Miguel Vargas	18 November 1978 (aged 16)		(Portugal) Sporting CP
10	MF	Pedro Hipólito	16 September 1978 (aged 16)		(Portugal) Benfica
11	DF	Marco Caneira	9 February 1979 (aged 16)		(Portugal) Sporting CP
12	GK	Pedro Alves	8 February 1979 (aged 16)		(Portugal) Belenenses
13	DF	Nuno Gomes	27 September 1978 (aged 16)		(Portugal) Sporting CP
14	DF	Jorge Cordeiro	2 September 1978 (aged 16)		(Portugal) Benfica
15	FW	Rodrigues	22 August 1978 (aged 16)		(Portugal) Benfica
16	MF	Moleiro	31 October 1978 (aged 16)		(Portugal) Porto
17	DF	Paulinho	20 October 1978 (aged 16)		(Portugal) Boavista
18	GK	Tó Figueira	30 August 1978 (aged 16)		(Portugal) Boavista

=== Costa Rica ===
Head coach: (Costa Rica) Armando Rodríguez Chacon

No.	Pos.	Player	Date of birth (age)	Caps	Club
1	GK	Fausto González	13 September 1978 (aged 16)		(Costa Rica) Asociacion Deportiva San Carlos
2	DF	Douglas Barquero	11 November 1978 (aged 16)		(Costa Rica) Paraiso Total S.A.D.
3	DF	Guillermo Molina	17 August 1978 (aged 16)		(Costa Rica) (No Club)
4	DF	Mackensy González	17 September 1978 (aged 16)		(Costa Rica) Liga Deportiva Alajuelense
5	MF	Jorge Fernández	14 September 1978 (aged 16)		(Costa Rica) Municipal Puntarenas
6	DF	Alejandro González	22 January 1979 (aged 16)		(Costa Rica) Liga Deportiva Alajuelense
7	FW	José Zúñiga	9 January 1980 (aged 15)		(Costa Rica) Liga Deportiva Alajuelense
8	FW	Nelson Fonseca	10 August 1978 (aged 16)		(Costa Rica) Deportivo Saprissa
9	FW	Yosen Sojo	13 August 1978 (aged 16)		(Costa Rica) Liga Deportiva Alajuelense
10	MF	Andrey Campos	7 December 1978 (aged 16)		(Costa Rica) Asociacion Deportiva San Carlos
11	MF	Román Vargas	27 October 1978 (aged 16)		(Costa Rica) (No Club)
12	MF	Alvin Villavicencio	13 November 1979 (aged 15)		(Costa Rica) Guanacasteca
13	MF	Carlos Castro	10 September 1979 (aged 15)		(Costa Rica) Liga Deportiva Alajuelense
14	FW	Gilberto Morant	6 December 1978 (aged 16)		(Costa Rica) Limonense
15	DF	Pablo Chinchilla	21 December 1978 (aged 16)		(Costa Rica) Deportivo Saprissa
16	GK	Rodolfo Álvarez	20 November 1978 (aged 16)		(Costa Rica) Deportivo Saprissa
17	FW	Jorge Alonso Solís	14 October 1978 (aged 16)		(Costa Rica) Deportivo Saprissa
18	DF	Gilbert Yibran Coronado	21 August 1978 (aged 16)		(Costa Rica) Puntarenas

=== Guinea ===
Head coach: (Guinea) Chérif Souleymane

No.	Pos.	Player	Date of birth (age)	Caps	Club
1	GK	Sékou Sylla	11 June 1979 (aged 16)		(Guinea)
2	DF	Souleymane Keïta	3 September 1979 (aged 15)		(Guinea)
3	DF	Kerfalla Sylla	18 January 1979 (aged 16)		(Guinea)
4	DF	Fodé Cissé	27 August 1979 (aged 15)		(Guinea)
5	DF	Ibrahima Conté	11 September 1978 (aged 16)		(Guinea)
6	DF	Facinet Camara	21 March 1979 (aged 16)		(Guinea)
7	MF	Kollet Camara	17 August 1980 (aged 14)		(Guinea)
8	MF	Bachir Kaba	29 December 1978 (aged 16)		(Guinea)
9	FW	Abdoulaye Camara	1 January 1979 (aged 16)		(Guinea) Onze Creaturs de Niarela
10	MF	Danny Sidibè	28 August 1979 (aged 15)		(Guinea)
11	FW	Ousmane Bangoura	1 December 1979 (aged 15)		(Guinea)
12	MF	Ismaël Conté	17 January 1979 (aged 16)		(Guinea)
13	MF	Sékou Soumah	25 June 1979 (aged 16)		(Guinea)
14	DF	Mohamed Camara	1 June 1979 (aged 16)		(Guinea)
15	FW	Souleymane Bah	12 November 1979 (aged 15)		(Guinea)
16	GK	Abdoulaye Condé	16 September 1979 (aged 15)		(Guinea)
17	FW	Pispa Camara	3 October 1979 (aged 15)		(Guinea)
18	DF	Daouda Sylla	6 May 1979 (aged 16)		(Guinea)

== Group C ==
=== Nigeria ===
Head coach: (Nigeria) Sebastian Brodrick

No.	Pos.	Player	Date of birth (age)	Caps	Club
1	GK	Olusegun Adeyemi	20 December 1978 (aged 16)		(Nigeria)
2	DF	Chiedu Chukwueke	28 December 1978 (aged 16)		(Nigeria)
3	DF	Haruna Abubakar	11 November 1978 (aged 16)		(Nigeria)
4	DF	Igeniwari George	15 February 1979 (aged 16)		(Nigeria)
5	MF	Godfrey Nwankpa	20 December 1978 (aged 16)		(Nigeria)
6	DF	Albert Yobo	5 May 1979 (aged 16)		(Nigeria) Enugu Rangers
7	MF	James Igwilo	24 November 1978 (aged 16)		(Nigeria)
8	MF	James Obiorah	24 August 1978 (aged 16)		(Belgium) Anderlecht
9	FW	Edward Anyamkyegh	10 October 1978 (aged 16)		(Nigeria)
10	MF	Olatubosun Ayeni	8 November 1978 (aged 16)		(Nigeria)
11	FW	Emmanuel Nwakire	15 August 1978 (aged 16)		(Nigeria)
12	MF	Munonye Chijoke	21 September 1979 (aged 15)		(Nigeria)
13	DF	Kingsley Samuel	27 December 1978 (aged 16)		(Nigeria)
14	DF	Kingsley Amuneke	26 July 1980 (aged 15)		(Nigeria) Julius Berger
15	FW	Henry Onwuzuruike	26 December 1979 (aged 15)		(Nigeria)
16	GK	Sampson Udofia	31 December 1979 (aged 15)		(Nigeria)
17	FW	Johnson Oruma	17 October 1979 (aged 15)		(Nigeria)
18	MF	Kazeem Ashimolowo	22 November 1980 (aged 14)		(Nigeria)

=== Qatar ===
Head coach: (Scotland) David McKay

No.	Pos.	Player	Date of birth (age)	Caps	Club
1	GK	Mohamed Qambar	19 August 1978 (aged 16)		(Qatar)
2	MF	Dahi Al Naemi	5 September 1978 (aged 16)		(Qatar) Al Sadd Sports Club
3	DF	Nayef Al Khater	5 October 1978 (aged 16)		(Qatar) Al Wakrah Sports Club
4	DF	Sultan Matif	21 August 1978 (aged 16)		(Qatar)
5	DF	Nabil Mohd	24 October 1978 (aged 16)		(Qatar)
6	MF	Jaweed Ghulam	15 August 1978 (aged 16)		(Qatar)
7	MF	Nasser Abdulla	12 November 1978 (aged 16)		(Qatar)
8	MF	Abdulaziz Karim	20 December 1979 (aged 15)		(Qatar)
9	FW	Mirghani Al Zain	18 August 1978 (aged 16)		(Qatar)
10	MF	Mohd Saeed	11 September 1978 (aged 16)		(Qatar)
11	FW	Mohamed Nasr	31 December 1978 (aged 16)		(Qatar)
12	MF	Ahmed Yousouf	18 November 1978 (aged 16)		(Qatar)
13	MF	Jassim Mahmoud	6 December 1980 (aged 14)		(Qatar)
14	MF	Rashed Obaid	26 September 1978 (aged 16)		(Qatar)
15	DF	Sahan Soud	17 September 1978 (aged 16)		(Qatar)
16	MF	Ismaïl Ali	23 December 1978 (aged 16)		(Qatar)
17	MF	Khaled Abdul	21 August 1978 (aged 16)		(Qatar)
18	GK	Ali Fouad	17 August 1978 (aged 16)		(Qatar)

=== Australia ===
Head coach: (Germany) Les Scheinflug

No.	Pos.	Player	Date of birth (age)	Caps	Club
1	GK	Adam Brodbeck	12 October 1978 (aged 16)		(Australia) NSW Institute of Sport
2	DF	Brett Emerton	22 February 1979 (aged 16)		(Australia) NSW Institute of Sport
3	MF	Harry Kewell	22 September 1978 (aged 16)		(Australia) NSW Institute of Sport
4	MF	Nickolas Johns	28 December 1978 (aged 16)		(Australia) Adamstown
5	DF	Colin Azzopardi	16 September 1978 (aged 16)		(Australia) Victorian Institute of Sport
6	DF	Sebastian Sinozić	14 September 1978 (aged 16)		(Australia) Parramatta
7	MF	Clayton Bell (captain)	21 September 1978 (aged 16)		(Australia) Victorian Institute of Sport
8	MF	John Maisano	6 January 1979 (aged 16)		(Australia) Victorian Institute of Sport
9	FW	Danny Allsopp	10 August 1978 (aged 16)		(Australia) Victorian Institute of Sport
10	MF	Michael Cunico	17 March 1979 (aged 16)		(Australia) Marconi Stallions
11	MF	Yane Talcevski	29 September 1978 (aged 16)		(Australia) Sydney United
12	MF	Daniel Ucchino	11 October 1978 (aged 16)		(Australia) Marconi Stallions
13	DF	Michael Galluzzo	17 November 1978 (aged 16)		(Australia) Marconi Fairfield
14	MF	Nicholas Rizzo	9 June 1979 (aged 16)		(Australia) Sydney Olympic
15	DF	Chris Coyne	20 December 1978 (aged 16)		(Australia) Perth SC
16	MF	Luke Tomich	4 December 1979 (aged 15)		(Australia) Marconi Stallions
17	MF	Ilija Prenzoski	7 August 1978 (aged 16)		(Australia) AIS
18	MF	Robert Matosevic	23 September 1978 (aged 16)		(Australia) South Australian Institute of Sport

=== Spain ===
Head coach: (Spain) Juan Santisteban

No.	Pos.	Player	Date of birth (age)	Caps	Club
1	GK	Joaquín Moso	7 September 1978 (aged 16)		(Spain) Real Zaragoza
2	DF	David Sánchez	13 December 1978 (aged 16)		(Spain) RCD Español
3	DF	Jesús Duarte	9 January 1980 (aged 15)		(Spain) Real Sociedad
4	DF	Javier Neira	16 October 1978 (aged 16)		(Spain) Athletic Bilbao
5	MF	Jordi Ferrón	19 August 1978 (aged 16)		(Spain) FC Barcelona
6	DF	Roberto Jiménez	27 September 1978 (aged 16)		(Spain) CD Leganés
7	MF	Fernando Varela	1 September 1979 (aged 15)		(Spain) Real Betis
8	MF	Gonzalo Colsa	2 April 1979 (aged 16)		(Spain) Racing Santander
9	FW	Ibán Espadas	4 August 1978 (aged 16)		(Spain) Athletic Bilbao
10	MF	Francisco Cachorro	7 August 1978 (aged 16)		(Spain) Athletic Bilbao
11	FW	Mista	12 November 1978 (aged 16)		(Spain) Real Madrid
12	DF	Heli	31 May 1979 (aged 16)		(Spain) Real Oviedo
13	GK	Carlos Ruiz	29 January 1979 (aged 16)		(Spain) CD Sonseca
14	DF	Mario Soto	20 October 1978 (aged 16)		(Spain) Atlético Madrid
15	DF	Roger Cánovas	1 August 1978 (aged 17)		(Spain) UE Sants
16	DF	Juan Leo	24 August 1979 (aged 15)		(Spain) RCD Español
17	FW	Antonio Araguás	9 September 1978 (aged 16)		(Spain) Huesca
18	FW	Jon Usandizaga	15 January 1979 (aged 16)		(Spain) Real Sociedad

== Group D ==
=== Brazil ===
Head coach: (Brazil) António José Fernandes Barroso

No.	Pos.	Player	Date of birth (age)	Caps	Club
1	GK	Júlio César	3 September 1979 (aged 15)		(Brazil) Flamengo
2	DF	Djimi	3 August 1978 (aged 17)		(Brazil) Gremio
3	DF	Bel	28 November 1979 (aged 15)		(Brazil) Guarani
4	DF	Juan C	1 February 1979 (aged 16)		(Brazil) Flamengo
5	DF	Hélder	5 February 1979 (aged 16)		(Brazil) Vasco da Gama
6	DF	Fábio Aurélio	24 September 1979 (aged 15)		(Brazil) São Paulo
7	MF	Maricá	24 September 1979 (aged 15)		(Brazil) Vasco da Gama
8	MF	Carlos Alberto	15 August 1978 (aged 16)		(Brazil) Grêmio
9	FW	Marco Antônio	23 August 1978 (aged 16)		(Brazil) São Paulo
10	MF	Kléber	19 November 1978 (aged 16)		(Brazil) Vitória
11	FW	Fábio	27 August 1978 (aged 16)		(Brazil) Londrina Esporte Clube
12	GK	Yamada	17 February 1979 (aged 16)		(Brazil) Corinthians
13	DF	Eduardo	4 February 1979 (aged 16)		(Brazil) Flamengo
14	DF	Gaia	8 September 1978 (aged 16)		(Brazil) Vitoria
15	FW	Rocha	19 January 1979 (aged 16)		(Brazil) Flamengo
16	MF	Renato	15 May 1979 (aged 16)		(Brazil) Guarani
17	FW	Edu	10 January 1979 (aged 16)		(Brazil) São Paulo
18	MF	Rodrigo	15 May 1979 (aged 16)		(Brazil) Gremio

=== Germany ===
Head coach: (Germany) Bernd Stöber

No.	Pos.	Player	Date of birth (age)	Caps	Club
1	GK	Harald Huber	17 August 1978 (aged 16)		(Germany) Bayern Munich
2	DF	Klaus Voike	10 October 1978 (aged 16)		(Germany) Borussia Dortmund
3	MF	Alexander Bugera	8 August 1978 (aged 16)		(Germany) Amberg
4	DF	Manuel Benthin	3 March 1979 (aged 16)		(Germany) Tennis Borussia Berlin
5	MF	Fabian Ernst	30 May 1979 (aged 16)		(Germany) Hannover 96
6	MF	Michael Bauer	16 November 1978 (aged 16)		(Germany) Bayern Munich
7	FW	Marcus Claus	25 November 1978 (aged 16)		(Germany) Carl Zeiss Jena
8	FW	Stefan Bernhardt	20 September 1978 (aged 16)		(Germany) Dynamo Dresden
9	MF	Marco Kurth	18 August 1978 (aged 16)		(Germany) Hallescher FC
10	FW	Timo Rost	29 August 1978 (aged 16)		(Germany) 1. FC Nürnberg
11	MF	Tobias Iseli	17 August 1978 (aged 16)		(Germany) VfB Stuttgart
12	GK	Raphael Schäfer	30 January 1979 (aged 16)		(Germany) Hannover 96
13	DF	Thorsten Schramm	19 February 1979 (aged 16)		(Germany) Duisburg
14	MF	Andreas Voss	27 February 1979 (aged 16)		(Germany) Bayer Leverkusen
15	MF	Damian Brezina	8 November 1978 (aged 16)		(Germany) Hannover 96
16	DF	Manuel Majunke	10 February 1979 (aged 16)		(Germany) VfB Stuttgart
17	MF	Patrick Falk	8 February 1980 (aged 15)		(Germany) Eintracht Frankfurt
18	FW	Christian Timm	27 February 1979 (aged 16)		(Germany) Borussia Dortmund

=== Oman ===
Head coach: (England) George Smith

No.	Pos.	Player	Date of birth (age)	Caps	Club
1	GK	Sulaiman Arami	12 August 1978 (aged 16)		(Oman)
2	DF	Badar Al-Mahrouqi	12 December 1979 (aged 15)		(Oman)
3	DF	Ali Mudhaidri	8 November 1978 (aged 16)		(Oman)
4	DF	Sultan Ismaili	27 November 1979 (aged 15)		(Oman)
5	MF	Mohammed Amar Al-Kathiri	7 December 1978 (aged 16)		(Oman)
6	MF	Wadha Sibani	31 December 1978 (aged 16)		(Oman)
7	FW	Samir Shaban	5 December 1978 (aged 16)		(Oman)
8	MF	Taqi Mubarak Al-Siyabi	20 August 1978 (aged 16)		(Oman)
9	FW	Mohamed Al-Battashi	22 September 1978 (aged 16)		(Oman)
10	MF	Abdul Al-Alawi	12 July 1979 (aged 16)		(Oman)
11	MF	Khalid Naami	27 September 1978 (aged 16)		(Oman)
12	GK	Radwan Saleem	1 September 1978 (aged 16)		(Oman)
13	DF	Aziz Ruqaishi	15 December 1978 (aged 16)		(Oman)
14	MF	Yousuf Yahmedi	23 December 1979 (aged 15)		(Oman)
15	FW	Hani Al-Dhabit	15 October 1979 (aged 15)		(Oman)
16	DF	Khalid Rawas	6 September 1978 (aged 16)		(Oman)
17	MF	Saleh Fora	7 December 1978 (aged 16)		(Oman)
18	DF	Rahman Saadi	11 November 1978 (aged 16)		(Oman)

=== Canada ===
Head coach: (Scotland) Tony Taylor

No.	Pos.	Player	Date of birth (age)	Caps	Club
1	GK	David Clemente	5 November 1978 (aged 16)		(Canada) Oakville
2	DF	Danny Gallagher	26 September 1978 (aged 16)		(Canada) Oakville
3	DF	Steve Maio	31 December 1978 (aged 16)		(Canada) Scarborough Malvern
4	MF	Patrice Bernier	23 September 1979 (aged 15)		(Canada) Brossard
5	MF	Brad Parker	23 April 1980 (aged 15)		(Canada) Scarborough Malvern
6	DF	Paolo DiPietrantonio	24 September 1978 (aged 16)		(Canada) Scarborough Malvern
7	MF	Chris Stewart	18 March 1979 (aged 16)		(Canada) Pickering
8	MF	Adam Lee	8 August 1978 (aged 16)		(Canada) North Scarborough
9	FW	Aaron Benjamin	2 March 1979 (aged 16)		(Canada) Scarborough Malvern
10	FW	Edward McMillan	5 September 1978 (aged 16)		(Canada) Oakville
11	FW	Mark Smith	28 March 1979 (aged 16)		(Canada) Scarborough Malvern
12	FW	Jason Mathot	1 August 1978 (aged 17)		(Canada) Burnaby Metro
13	DF	Jahmo Welch	14 July 1979 (aged 16)		(Canada) Scarborough Malvern
14	DF	Kashka Walker	10 November 1978 (aged 16)		(Canada) Scarborough Malvern
15	DF	Ian Jeffrey	24 April 1979 (aged 16)		(Canada) Pickering
16	MF	Roberto Sorella	22 August 1978 (aged 16)		(Canada) CSRDP
17	MF	Kris Donev	10 September 1978 (aged 16)		(Canada) Erin Mills
18	GK	Alan Lewis	17 August 1978 (aged 16)		(Canada) Scarborough Malvern
