= 1995 UEFA European Under-16 Championship squads =

Football tournament squads

Below are the rosters for the 13th edition of the UEFA European Under-16 Football Championship 1995 tournament in Belgium. Players born on or after 1 August 1978 were eligible to participate and Belgium hosted the tournament from 24 April to 6 May 1995. Portugal won the tournament where 16 teams participated.

== Group A ==
=== Czech Republic ===
Head coach:

=== Italy ===
Head coach: http://www.figc.it/nazionali/ConvocatiGara?squadra=5&codiceGara=1247

ANDORNO DAVIDE F.C. JUVENTUS SPA
CIASCA FABIO A.S. ROMA SPA
CINGOLANI NICOLA F.C. JUVENTUS SPA
DAINO DANIELE A.C. MILAN SPA
DAN MARZIO F.C. JUVENTUS SPA
FORLANI OMAR CALCIO BRESCIA SPA
GIANDOMENICO LUIGI F.C. JUVENTUS SPA
GUASTALVINO PAOLO A.C. PERUGIA SPA
LAMBRUGHI MARCELLO A.C. MILAN SPA
LO GATTO PIERO TORINO CALCIO SPA
MACCAFERRI STEFANO BOLOGNA F.C. 1909 S.R.L.
MAFFEIS OMER CALCIO BRESCIA SPA
MALAGO MARCO A.C. VENEZIA 1907 S.R.L.
PIRLO ANDREA CALCIO BRESCIA SPA
POLIZZANO ANDREA A.S. LODIGIANI S.R.L.
REGONESI PIERRE GIORGIO ATALANTA BERG.SCA C.-SPA
RUGGINI ALESSANDRO A.S. LODIGIANI S.R.L.

=== Poland ===
Head coach: Andrzej Zamilski

No.	Pos.	Player	Date of birth (age)	Caps	Goals	Club
	GK	Artur Topolski	29 December 1978 (aged 16)			(Polish Football Association) Warta Poznań
	GK	Konrad Matysiak	13 August 1978 (aged 16)			(Polish Football Association) MZKS Kozienice
	GK	Dariusz Pączek	19 August 1978 (aged 16)			(Polish Football Association) Wisła Kraków
	DF	Daniel Tumas	9 December 1978 (aged 16)			(Polish Football Association) RKS Energetyk Rybnik
	DF	Rafał Jędrszczyk	26 October 1978 (aged 16)			(Polish Football Association) Wisła Kraków
	DF	Arkadiusz Głowacki	13 March 1979 (aged 16)			(Polish Football Association) SKS 13 Poznań
	DF	Jacek Popek	20 August 1978 (aged 16)			(Polish Football Association) Petrochemia Płock
	DF	Kamil Sieczka	30 June 1979 (aged 15)			(Polish Football Association) Górnik Zabrze
	DF	Mariusz Jop	3 August 1978 (aged 16)			(Polish Football Association) KSZO Ostrowiec
	MF	Michał Osiński	5 September 1978 (aged 16)			(Polish Football Association) ŁKS Łódź
	MF	Arkadiusz Świetosławski	14 January 1979 (aged 16)			(Polish Football Association) Włókniarz Aleksandrów
	MF	Marcin Nowak	26 June 1979 (aged 15)			(Polish Football Association) Gwarek Zabrze
	MF	Ireneusz Kowalski	17 March 1979 (aged 16)			(Polish Football Association) Parasol Wrocław
	MF	Paweł Woźniak	11 October 1978 (aged 16)			(Polish Football Association) Chrobry Głogów
	MF	Marek Piątek	10 October 1978 (aged 16)			(Polish Football Association) Lechia Gdańsk
	FW	Marek Saganowski	31 October 1978 (aged 16)			(Polish Football Association) ŁKS Łódź
	FW	Arkadiusz Matejko	16 September 1978 (aged 16)			(Polish Football Association) Górnik Zabrze
	FW	Dariusz Dziewulski	28 August 1978 (aged 16)			(Polish Football Association) Orlęta Łuków
	FW	Dawid Banaczek	3 June 1979 (aged 15)			(Polish Football Association) Lechia Gdańsk

=== Sweden ===
Head coach:

== Group B ==
=== Austria ===
Head coach:

=== Belgium ===
Head coach:Marc Van Geersom

No.	Pos.	Player	Date of birth (age)	Caps	Goals	Club
1	GK	Jean-François Gillet	31 May 1979 (aged 15)			
2	DF	Axel Vergeylen	9 March 1979 (aged 16)			
4	DF	Stijn Vlaminck	9 March 1979 (aged 16)			
5	DF	Stefan Teelen	10 April 1979 (aged 16)			
6		Cedric Lehance				
7	MF	Ronaldo Lopes-Rodrigues	12 August 1978 (aged 16)			
8	DF	Jerry Poorters	9 October 1978 (aged 16)			
9		Gerd Jenssens				
10	MF	Walter Baseggio	19 August 1978 (aged 16)			
11	FW	Jurgen Cavens	19 August 1978 (aged 16)			
12	GK	Johnny Lebegge	22 May 1979 (aged 15)			
13		Christophe Otte				
14		Hans Dewaele				
15		Tiziano Quarta	6 July 1979 (aged 15)			
16		Davy Stuer				

=== France ===
Head coach:

=== Norway ===
Head coach:

== Group C ==
=== Germany ===
Head coach: Bernd Stober

No.	Pos.	Player	Date of birth (age)	Caps	Goals	Club
1	GK	Harald Huber	17 August 1978 (aged 16)			FC Bayern Munich
2	DF	Jörn Schmiedel	13 September 1978 (aged 16)			VfB Stuttgart
3	MF	Tobias Iseli	17 August 1978 (aged 16)			VfB Stuttgart
4	DF	Manuel Benthin	3 March 1979 (aged 16)			Hertha BSC
5	DF	Fabian Ernst	30 May 1979 (aged 15)			Hannover 96
6	DF	Michael Bauer	16 November 1978 (aged 16)			FC Bayern Munich
7	MF	Timo Rost	28 August 1978 (aged 16)			1. FC Nürnberg
8	MF	Michael Berndt	14 December 1978 (aged 16)			1. FC Kaiserslautern
9	DF	Alexander Bugera	8 August 1978 (aged 16)			FC Bayern Munich
10	MF	Damian Brezina	8 November 1978 (aged 16)			Hannover 96
11	MF	Wolf-Manuel Majunke	10 February 1979 (aged 16)			VfB Stuttgart
12	GK	Raphael Schafer	30 January 1979 (aged 16)			Hannover 96
13	DF	Marcus Claus	25 November 1978 (aged 16)			FC Carl Zeiss Jena
14	MF	Marco Kurth	18 August 1978 (aged 16)			VfB Leipzig
15	MF	Andreas Voss	27 February 1979 (aged 16)			Bayer 04 Leverkusen
16	MF	Tommaso Fontana	2 January 1979 (aged 16)			Eintracht Frankfurt

=== Slovenia ===
Head coach:Mahmut Kapidzic

No.	Pos.	Player	Date of birth (age)	Caps	Goals	Club
	GK	Tomaž Murko	7 February 1979 (aged 16)			
	DF	Suad Filekovic	16 August 1978 (aged 16)			
	MF	Bostjan Znuderl	17 January 1979 (aged 16)			
	DF	Sani Trgo	20 August 1978 (aged 16)			
	FW	Damir Pekic	15 January 1979 (aged 16)			
	FW	Goran Sankovic	18 June 1979 (aged 15)			

=== Spain ===
Head coach: Juan Santisteban

No.	Pos.	Player	Date of birth (age)	Caps	Goals	Club
	GK	Joaquín Moso	7 September 1978 (aged 16)			(Royal Spanish Football Federation) Real Zaragoza
	GK	Carlos Ruiz				(Royal Spanish Football Federation) CD Sonseca
	DF	Roberto	27 September 1978 (aged 16)			(Royal Spanish Football Federation) CD Leganés
	DF	Jordi Ferrón	15 August 1978 (aged 16)			(Royal Spanish Football Federation) FC Barcelona
	DF	Jesús Duarte	9 January 1980 (aged 15)			(Royal Spanish Football Federation) Real Sociedad
	DF	Javier Díaz Neira	16 October 1978 (aged 16)			(Royal Spanish Football Federation) Athletic Bilbao
	DF	Helio	31 March 1979 (aged 16)			(Royal Spanish Football Federation) Real Oviedo
	DF	David Sánchez	13 December 1978 (aged 16)			(Royal Spanish Football Federation) RCD Español
	MF	Fernando Varela	1 September 1979 (aged 15)			(Royal Spanish Football Federation) Real Betis
	MF	Gonzalo Colsa	11 May 1979 (aged 15)			(Royal Spanish Football Federation) Racing de Santander
	MF	Gabri	10 February 1979 (aged 16)			(Royal Spanish Football Federation) Barcelona
	MF	Enrique de Lucas	17 August 1978 (aged 16)			(Royal Spanish Football Federation) RCD Español
	MF	Francisco Javier Katxorro	7 August 1978 (aged 16)			(Royal Spanish Football Federation) Athletic Bilbao
	FW	Ibán Espadas	4 August 1978 (aged 16)			(Royal Spanish Football Federation) Athletic Bilbao
	FW	Mario Bermejo	7 October 1978 (aged 16)			(Royal Spanish Football Federation) Racing de Santander
	FW	Usandi	15 January 1979 (aged 16)			(Royal Spanish Football Federation) Real Sociedad

=== Turkey ===
Head coach: Necati Özcaglayan

No.	Pos.	Player	Date of birth (age)	Caps	Goals	Club
		Selahattin Uludaş	25 October 1978 (aged 16)			
	DF	İsmail Güldüren	10 January 1979 (aged 16)			
	MF	Aytekin Viduşlu	28 August 1978 (aged 16)			
	MF	Volkan Arslan	28 August 1978 (aged 16)			
	FW	Ufuk Ateş	6 September 1978 (aged 16)			
	DF	Emrah Eren	13 November 1978 (aged 16)			
	MF	Ünal Sari	15 November 1978 (aged 16)			
	MF	Yıldıray Baştürk	24 December 1978 (aged 16)			
		Murat Savaş	26 July 1979 (aged 15)			
		Bülent Turna	5 September 1978 (aged 16)			
		Mahmut Topal	25 September 1978 (aged 16)			
		Mehmet Ali Beşel	29 August 1978 (aged 16)			
		Erdal Tanhan	1 November 1978 (aged 16)			
		Nail Alköse	29 August 1978 (aged 16)			
		Abdullah Koca	20 September 1978 (aged 16)			
		Selçuk Aydin	2 August 1978 (aged 16)			

== Group D ==
=== England ===
Head coach:Keith Blunt

No.	Pos.	Player	Date of birth (age)	Caps	Goals	Club
1	GK	Paul Heritage	17 April 1979 (aged 16)			(The Football Association) Sheffield United
2	DF	Elliott Dickman	11 October 1978 (aged 16)			(The Football Association) Sunderland
3	DF	Jason Crowe	30 September 1978 (aged 16)			(The Football Association) Arsenal
4	DF	John Curtis	3 September 1978 (aged 16)			(The Football Association) Manchester United
5	DF	Matt Wicks	8 September 1978 (aged 16)			(The Football Association) Arsenal
6	MF	Jody Morris	22 December 1978 (aged 16)			(The Football Association) Chelsea
7	MF	Stuart Brightwell	31 January 1979 (aged 16)			(The Football Association) Manchester United
8	MF	Mark Gower	5 October 1978 (aged 16)			(The Football Association) Tottenham Hotspur
9	FW	Michael Branch	18 October 1978 (aged 16)			(The Football Association) Everton
10	FW	Luke Staton	10 March 1979 (aged 16)			(The Football Association) Blackburn Rovers
11	MF	Andy Wright	21 October 1978 (aged 16)			(The Football Association) Leeds United
12	DF	Neil Clement	3 October 1978 (aged 16)			(The Football Association) Chelsea
13	MF	Anthony Ormerod	31 March 1979 (aged 16)			(The Football Association) Middlesbrough
14	GK	John O'Toole	23 February 1979 (aged 16)			(The Football Association) Everton

=== Portugal ===
Head coach:Rui Caçador

No.	Pos.	Player	Date of birth (age)	Caps	Goals	Club
1	GK	Marcio Santos	5 May 1979 (aged 15)			
2	FW	Zeferinho	27 August 1978 (aged 16)			
3	DF	Correia	9 February 1979 (aged 16)			
4	DF	Brito	30 August 1978 (aged 16)			
5	MF	Vítor Pereira	27 September 1978 (aged 16)			
6	DF	Hugo Leal	21 May 1980 (aged 14)			
7	MF	Miguel Costa	4 November 1978 (aged 16)			
8	DF	Ricardo Aires	9 September 1978 (aged 16)			
9	FW	Vargas	18 November 1978 (aged 16)			
10	MF	Pedro Hipólito	16 September 1978 (aged 16)			
11	DF	Caneira	9 February 1979 (aged 16)			
12	GK	Pedro Alves	8 February 1979 (aged 16)			
13	DF	Gomes	27 September 1978 (aged 16)			
14	MF	Jorge Cordeiro	2 September 1978 (aged 16)			
15	MF	Pedro Rodrigues	22 August 1978 (aged 16)			
16	MF	Helder Silva	2 September 1978 (aged 16)			

=== Scotland ===
Head coach:

=== Slovakia ===
Head coach:
