= 2010–11 Polish Cup =

Tournament details
- Country: Poland
- Teams: 83

Final positions
- Champions: Legia Warsaw
- Runners-up: Lech Poznań

Tournament statistics
- Top goal scorer(s): Gražvydas Mikulėnas; Artjoms Rudņevs (4 goals each)

The 2010–11 Polish Cup was the fifty-seventh season of the annual Polish football knockout tournament. It began on 21 July 2010 with the first matches of the Extra Preliminary Round and ended in 2011 with the Final. The winners qualified for the third qualifying round of the 2011–12 UEFA Europa League. Jagiellonia Białystok were the defending champions, having won their first title in the season before.

== Extra Preliminary round ==
The draw for this round was conducted at the headquarters of the Polish FA on 29 June 2010. Participating in this round were 16 regional cup winners and 36 teams from the 2010–11 II Liga. The matches were played between 21 and 25 July 2010.

Team 1	Score	Team 2
21 July 2010
Kaszubia Kościerzyna	1–3 (a.e.t.)	Olimpia Grudziądz
Hutnik Szczecin	1–5	Zawisza Bydgoszcz
MKS Korsze	1–4	Bałtyk Gdynia
OKS 1945 Olsztyn	2–1	Sokół Sokółka
Lech Rypin	2–0	Tur Turek
Unia Swarzędz	1–0	Polonia Słubice
Arka Nowa Sól	0–3	Jarota Jarocin
MKS Kutno	1–0	Przebój Wolbrom
Orzeł Wierzbica	0–4	Wigry Suwałki
Nida Pińczów	0–2	Resovia Rzeszów
Bielawianka Bielawa	3–1	Czarni Żagań
Ślęza Wrocław	w/o^{1}	Ruch Zdzieszowice
Rozwój Katowice	0–1	Concordia Piotrków Trybunalski
Stal Sanok	w/o^{2}	Hetman Zamość
Sokół Aleksandrów Łódzki	3–1	Jeziorak Iława
Olimpia Elbląg	1–0	Ruch Wysokie Mazowieckie
Unia Janikowo	0–3	Świt Nowy Dwór Mazowiecki
Elana Toruń	2–2 (a.e.t.) (6–7 p)	Nielba Wągrowiec
Miedź Legnica	3–2 (a.e.t.)	Ruch Radzionków
Lechia Zielona Góra	1–0 (a.e.t.)	Górnik Polkowice
Raków Częstochowa	0–2	GKS Tychy
24 July 2010
Helena Nowy Sącz	w/o^{3}	GKS Jastrzębie
Zagłębie Sosnowiec	1–0	Pelikan Łowicz
Start Otwock	1–0	Okocimski KS Brzesko
25 July 2010
Spartakus Szarowola^{4}	w/o^{5}	Stal Rzeszów
Kolejarz Stróże	1–0	LKS Nieciecza

Notes

- Note 1: Ślęza withdrew from the competition.
- Note 2: Hetman withdrew from the competition.
- Note 3: The away team failed to arrive.
- Note 4: Spartakus Szarowola participated under the name of Motor Lublin
- Note 5: The home team failed to provide a venue.

== Preliminary round ==
The draw for this round was conducted at the headquarters of the Polish FA on 29 June 2010. The 26 winners of the Extra Preliminary Round were drawn into 12 matches. MKS Kutno and Świt Nowy Dwór Mazowiecki received a bye to the first round. The matches took place on 4 August 2010.

Team 1	Score	Team 2
4 August 2010
Olimpia Grudziądz	1–2	Zawisza Bydgoszcz
Bałtyk Gdynia	0–2	OKS 1945 Olsztyn
Lech Rypin	2–2 (a.e.t.) (2–3 p)	Unia Swarzędz
Jarota Jarocin	1–0	Nielba Wągrowiec
Wigry Suwałki	1–0	Stal Rzeszów
Concordia Piotrków Trybunalski	2–2 (a.e.t.) (6–5 p)	Resovia Rzeszów
Bielawianka Bielawa	1–3	Ruch Zdzieszowice
Helena Nowy Sącz	1–8	Stal Sanok
Sokół Aleksandrów Łódzki	0–2	Olimpia Elbląg
Zagłębie Sosnowiec	1–2 (a.e.t.)	Start Otwock
Miedź Legnica	2–1	Lechia Zielona Góra
GKS Tychy	3–2	Kolejarz Stróże

== Round 1 ==
The draw for this round was conducted at the headquarters of the Polish FA on 10 August 2010. The 14 winners of the preliminary round, along with MKS Kutno and Świt Nowy Dwór Mazowiecki and the eighteen teams from 2009–10 I Liga competed in this round. Znicz Pruszków was drawn automatically to the second round.

Team 1	Score	Team 2
24 August 2010
Jarota Jarocin	1–1 (a.e.t.) (4–5 p)	Flota Świnoujście
Miedź Legnica	1–2	GKP Gorzów Wielkopolski
MKS Kutno	0–3	KSZO Ostrowiec Świętokrzyski
Świt Nowy Dwór Mazowiecki	1–0	MKS Kluczbork
25 August 2010
Zawisza Bydgoszcz	0–3	Widzew Łódź
OKS 1945 Olsztyn	2–2 (a.e.t.)	Warta Poznań
Unia Swarzędz	0–4	Pogoń Szczecin
Wigry Suwałki	2–1	Górnik Łęczna
Concordia Piotrków Trybunalski	2–1	Stal Stalowa Wola
Ruch Zdzieszowice	1–0	GKS Katowice
Stal Sanok	0–3	Dolcan Ząbki
Olimpia Elbląg	1–2 (a.e.t.)	ŁKS Łódź
Start Otwock	2–2 (a.e.t.) (5–6 p)	Podbeskidzie Bielsko-Biała
GKS Tychy	1–0	Sandecja Nowy Sącz
Wisła Płock	1–3	Górnik Zabrze

== Round 2 ==
The draw for this round was conducted at the headquarters of the Polish FA on 31 August 2010. The 16 winners of Round 1 and the sixteen teams from 2009–10 Ekstraklasa, competed in this round. The matches were played on 21 and 22 September 2010.

Team 1	Score	Team 2
21 September 2010
Dolcan Ząbki	0–1	Wisła Kraków
Wigry Suwałki	0–2	Korona Kielce
GKS Tychy	0–1	Lech Poznań
GKP Gorzów Wielkopolski	0–1	Cracovia
Concordia Piotrków Trybunalski	0–1	GKS Bełchatów
Znicz Pruszków	0–1	Polonia Warszawa
ŁKS Łódź	3–0	Polonia Bytom
Pogoń Szczecin	0–1	Legia Warszawa
Świt Nowy Dwór Mazowiecki	0–1	Śląsk Wrocław
Górnik Zabrze	0–2	Lechia Gdańsk
22 September 2010
Flota Świnoujście	0–1	Jagiellonia Białystok
Ruch Zdzieszowice	1–3	Ruch Chorzów
OKS 1945 Olsztyn	2–0	Odra Wodzisław
KSZO Ostrowiec	2–1 (a.e.t.)	Arka Gdynia
Widzew Łódź	1–0 (a.e.t.)	Zagłębie Lubin
Podbeskidzie Bielsko-Biała	2–0	Piast Gliwice

21 September 2010	Dolcan Ząbki	0–1	Wisła Kraków	Ząbki
15:00 CEST (UTC+02:00)			Brożek 10'	Stadium: Stadion Dolcanu; Attendance: 2,200; Referee: Hubert Siejewicz (Białystok)

21 September 2010	Wigry Suwałki	0–2	Korona Kielce	Suwałki
15:30 CEST (UTC+02:00)			Tataj 22', 78'	Stadium: Suwałki City Stadium; Attendance: 1,800; Referee: Tomasz Musiał (Kraków)

21 September 2010	GKS Tychy	0–1	Lech Poznań	Tychy
16:00 CEST (UTC+02:00)			Štilić 77'	Stadium: Tychy City Stadium; Attendance: 3,100; Referee: Michał Mularczyk (Skierniewice)

21 September 2010	GKP Gorzów Wielkopolski	0–1	Cracovia	Gorzów Wielkopolski
16:00 CEST (UTC+02:00)			Ślusarski 69'	Stadium: Stadion OSIR; Attendance: 3,000; Referee: Adam Lyczmański (Bydgoszcz)

21 September 2010	Concordia Piotrków Trybunalski	0–1	GKS Bełchatów	Radomsko
16:00 CEST (UTC+02:00)			Vinícius 21'	Stadium: Radomsko City Stadium^{1} Attendance: 700; Referee: Sebastian Jarzębak (Bytom)

21 September 2010	Znicz Pruszków	0–1	Polonia Warsaw	Pruszków
18:30 CEST (UTC+02:00)			Coutinho 90+3'	Stadium: Stadion Znicza; Attendance: 2,000; Referee: Jarosław Chmiel (Warsaw)

21 September 2010	ŁKS Łódź	3–0	Polonia Bytom	Łódź
19:00 CEST (UTC+02:00)	Mowlik 58'; Kosecki 64'; Mięciel 90+1'			Stadium: Stadion ŁKS; Attendance: 2,100; Referee: Szymon Marciniak (Płock)

21 September 2010	Pogoń Szczecin	0–1	Legia Warsaw	Szczecin
19:00 CEST (UTC+02:00)			Kucharczyk 88'	Stadium: Stadion Florian Kryger; Attendance: 11,000; Referee: Dawid Piasecki (Słupsk)

21 September 2010	Świt Nowy Dwór Mazowiecki	0–1	Śląsk Wrocław	Nowy Dwór Mazowiecki
19:00 CEST (UTC+02:00)			Gikiewicz 25'	Stadium: Nowy Dwór Mazowiecki City Stadium; Attendance: 500; Referee: Robert Małek (Zabrze)

21 September 2010	Górnik Zabrze	0–2	Lechia Gdańsk	Zabrze
19:00 CEST (UTC+02:00)			Traoré 16'; Buval 45'	Stadium: Stadion Ernest Pohl; Attendance: 2,900; Referee: Paweł Pskit (Łódź)

22 September 2010	Flota Świnoujście	0–1	Jagiellonia Białystok	Świnoujście
15:30			Makuszewski 5'	Stadium: Świnoujście City Stadium; Attendance: 2,200; Referee: Daniel Stefański (Białystok)

22 September 2010	Ruch Zdzieszowice	1–3	Ruch Chorzów	Zdzieszowice
16:00 CEST (UTC+02:00)	Juszczak 54'		Jankowski 1', 61'; Nykiel 50'	Stadium: Zdzieszowice City Stadium; Attendance: 2,800; Referee: Włodzimierz Bartos (Łódź)

22 September 2010	OKS 1945 Olsztyn	2–0	Odra Wodzisław	Olsztyn
16:00 CEST (UTC+02:00)	Tumicz 6'; Stefanowicz 27'			Stadium: Stadion OSiR; Attendance: 2,100; Referee: Radosław Trochimiuk (Ciechanów)

22 September 2010	KSZO Ostrowiec	2–1 (a.e.t.)	Arka Gdynia	Ostrowiec Świętokrzyski
18:00 CEST (UTC+02:00)	Żelazowski 95'; Białek 99'		Ivanovski 111'	Stadium: Stadion KSZO; Attendance: 1,600; Referee: Paweł Raczkowski (Warsaw)

22 September 2010	Widzew Łódź	1–0 (a.e.t.)	Zagłębie Lubin	Łódź
18:00 CEST (UTC+02:00)	Grischok 103'			Stadium: Stadion Widzewa; Attendance: 4,500; Referee: Marcin Borski (Warsaw)

22 September 2010	Podbeskidzie Bielsko-Biała	2–0	Piast Gliwice	Bielsko-Biała
20:00 CEST (UTC+02:00)	Patejuk 76'; Osiński 88'			Stadium: Stadion Miejski w Bielsku-Białej; Attendance: 1,500; Referee: Tomasz Garbowski (Kluczbork)

Notes

- Note 1: Played in Radomsko at Radomsko City Stadium as Concordia's Piotrków Trybunalski City Stadium is undergoing renovative work.

== Round 3 ==
The 16 winners from Round 2 competed in this round. The matches took place on October 26 and October 27, 2010.

Team 1	Score	Team 2
26 October 2010
Korona Kielce	0–1	Jagiellonia Białystok
KSZO Ostrowiec	0–2 (a.e.t.)	Polonia Warsaw
Podbeskidzie Bielsko-Biała	2–0	GKS Bełchatów
Śląsk Wrocław	1–2	Legia Warsaw
ŁKS Łódź	0–0 (a.e.t.) (1–3 p)	Lechia Gdańsk
Wisła Kraków	1–0	Widzew Łódź
27 October 2010
OKS 1945 Olsztyn	0–0 (a.e.t.) (0–3 p)	Ruch Chorzów
Cracovia	1–4	Lech Poznań

26 October 2010	Korona Kielce	0–1	Jagiellonia Białystok	Kielce
17:00 CEST (UTC+02:00)			Makuszewski 20'	Stadium: Arena Kielc; Attendance: 4,900; Referee: Mirosław Górecki (Katowice)

26 October 2010	KSZO Ostrowiec	0–2 (a.e.t.)	Polonia Warsaw	Ostrowiec Świętokrzyski
17:30 CEST (UTC+02:00)			Teodorczyk 99'; Mierzejewski 120+1'	Stadium: Stadion KSZO; Attendance: 500; Referee: Tomasz Musiał (Kraków)

26 October 2010	Podbeskidzie Bielsko-Biała	2–0	GKS Bełchatów	Bielsko-Biała
18:00 CEST (UTC+02:00)	Patejuk 2'; Demjan 33'			Stadium: Stadion Miejski w Bielsku-Białej; Attendance: 1,500; Referee: Paweł Raczkowski (Warsaw)

26 October 2010	Śląsk Wrocław	1–2	Legia Warsaw	Wrocław
18:45 CEST (UTC+02:00)	Sobota 82'		Szałachowski 72', 85'	Stadium: Stadion Oporowska; Attendance: 6,100; Referee: Sebastian Jarzębak (Bytom)

26 October 2010	ŁKS Łódź	0–0 (a.e.t.) (1–3 p)	Lechia Gdańsk	Łódź
19:00 CEST (UTC+02:00)				Stadium: Stadion ŁKS; Attendance: 2,800; Referee: Radosław Trochimiuk (Ciechanów)
	Penalties
	Mączyński (penalty missed); Kosecki (penalty scored); Romańczuk (penalty missed)		(penalty scored) Surma; (penalty missed) Buzała; (penalty scored) Traoré; (penalty scored) Kaczmarek

26 October 2010	Wisła Kraków	1–0	Widzew Łódź	Kraków
20:30 CEST (UTC+02:00)	Żurawski 87'			Stadium: Henryk Reyman Stadium; Attendance: 7,300; Referee: Daniel Stefański (Bydgoszcz)

27 October 2010	OKS 1945 Olsztyn	0–0 (a.e.t.) (0–3 p)	Ruch Chorzów	Olsztyn
14:30 CEST (UTC+02:00)				Stadium: Stadion OSiR; Attendance: 3,500; Referee: Łukasz Bednarek (Koszalin)
	Penalties
	Bucholc (penalty missed); Miłkowski (penalty missed); Michałowski (penalty missed)		(penalty scored) Grzyb; (penalty scored) Malinowski; (penalty scored) Stawarczyk

27 October 2010	Cracovia	1–4	Lech Poznań	Kraków
18:30 CEST (UTC+02:00)	Ślusarski 59'		Peszko 22'; Rudņevs 43', 61'; Wilk 90+2'	Stadium: Józef Piłsudski Stadium; Attendance: 7,700; Referee: Marcin Szulc (Warsaw)

== Quarter-finals ==
The 8 winners from Round 3 will compete in this round.
The matches will be played in two legs. The first legs will take place between 20 February 2011 and 2 March 2011, while the second legs will be played between 2 and 16 March 2011.

Team 1	Agg.	Team 2	1st leg	2nd leg
Lech Poznań	2–2 (a)	Polonia Warsaw	0–1	2–1
Ruch Chorzów	1–3	Legia Warsaw	1–1	0–2
Lechia Gdańsk	1–1 (a)	Jagiellonia Białystok	0–0	1–1
Wisła Kraków	2–3	Podbeskidzie Bielsko-Biała	0–1	2–2

=== First leg ===
20 February 2011	Lech Poznań	0–1	Polonia Warsaw	Poznań
15:30 CET (UTC+01:00)			Arboleda 54' (o.g.)	Stadium: Stadion Miejski; Attendance: 18,000; Referee: Hubert Siejewicz (Białystok)

1 March 2011	Ruch Chorzów	1–1	Legia Warsaw	Chorzów
18:30 CET (UTC+01:00)	Piech 15'		Komorowski 55' (pen.)	Stadium: Stadion Ruchu; Attendance: 4,500; Referee: Tomasz Musiał (Kraków)

1 March 2011	Wisła Kraków	0–1	Podbeskidzie Bielsko-Biała	Kraków
20:30 CET (UTC+01:00)			Malinowski 89'	Stadium: Stadion im. Henryka Reymana; Attendance: 9,100; Referee: Szymon Marciniak (Płock)

2 March 2011	Lechia Gdańsk	0–0	Jagiellonia Białystok	Gdańsk
18:30 CET (UTC+01:00)				Stadium: Stadion Lechii; Attendance: 4,800; Referee: Marcin Borski (Warsaw)

=== Second leg ===
2 March 2011	Polonia Warsaw	1–2 (2–2 (a) agg.)	Lech Poznań	Warsaw
20:30 CET (UTC+01:00)	Kokoszka 33'		Bosacki 4' (pen.); Ślusarski 24'	Stadium: Stadion Polonii; Attendance: 3,100; Referee: Daniel Stefański (Bydgoszcz)

15 March 2011	Legia Warsaw	2–0 (3–1 agg.)	Ruch Chorzów	Warsaw
18:30 CET (UTC+01:00)	Vrdoljak 45', 59'			Stadium: Stadion Wojska Polskiego; Attendance: 14,200; Referee: Adam Lyczmański (Bydgoszcz)

16 March 2011	Jagiellonia Białystok	1–1 (1–1 (a) agg.)	Lechia Gdańsk	Białystok
18:30 CET (UTC+01:00)	Skerla 37'		Lukjanovs 25'	Stadium: Stadion Miejski; Attendance: 3,400; Referee: Szymon Marciniak (Płock)

16 March 2011	Podbeskidzie Bielsko-Biała	2–2 (2–3 agg.)	Wisła Kraków	Bielsko-Biała
20:30 CET (UTC+01:00)	Cieśliński 60'; Górkiewicz 76'		Demjan 25' (o.g.); Genkov 54'	Stadium: Stadion Miejski w Bielsku-Białej; Attendance: 3,200; Referee: Marcin Borski (Warsaw)

== Semi-finals ==
The 4 winners from the Quarterfinals will compete in this round.
The matches will be played in two legs. The first legs will take place on 5 and 6 April 2011, while the second legs will be played two weeks later on 19 and 20 April 2011.

Team 1	Agg.	Team 2	1st leg	2nd leg
Lech Poznań	4–3	Podbeskidzie Bielsko-Biała	1–1	3–2
Lechia Gdańsk	0–5	Legia Warsaw	0–1	0–4

=== First leg ===
5 April 2011	Lech Poznań	1–1	Podbeskidzie Bielsko-Biała	Poznań
18:00 CEST (UTC+02:00)	Ślusarski 59'		Cieśliński 90+3'	Stadium: Stadion Miejski; Attendance: 15,400; Referee: Tomasz Musiał (Kraków)

6 April 2011	Lechia Gdańsk	0–1	Legia Warsaw	Gdańsk
18:30 CEST (UTC+02:00)			Kucharczyk 88'	Stadium: Stadion Lechii; Attendance: 7,300; Referee: Michał Mularczyk (Łódź)

=== Second leg ===
19 April 2011	Podbeskidzie Bielsko-Biała	2–3 (3–4 agg.)	Lech Poznań	Bielsko-Biała
20:30 CEST (UTC+02:00)	Chmiel 24'; Malinowski 58'		Štilić 73'; Rudņevs 75', 90+3'	Stadium: Stadion Miejski w Bielsku-Białej; Attendance: 4,200; Referee: Włodzimierz Bartos (Łódź)

20 April 2011	Legia Warsaw	4–0 (5–0 agg.)	Lechia Gdańsk	Warsaw
18:30 CEST (UTC+02:00)	Radović 25'; Vrdoljak 63'; Bąk 76' (o.g.); Kucharczyk 78'			Stadium: Stadion Wojska Polskiego; Attendance: 15,800; Referee: Paweł Pskit (Łódź)

== Final ==
3 May 2011
18:30 CEST (UTC+02:00)

Lech Poznań	1–1 (a.e.t.)	Legia Warsaw
Injac 29'		Manú 66'
Penalties
Bosacki (penalty missed); Štilić (penalty scored); Rudņevs (penalty scored); Mikołajczak (penalty scored); Wołąkiewicz (penalty scored)	4–5	(penalty scored) Cabral; (penalty scored) Komorowski; (penalty scored) Vrdoljak; (penalty scored) Rzeźniczak; (penalty scored) Wawrzyniak

Stadion im. Zdzisława Krzyszkowiaka, Bydgoszcz
Attendance: 18,200
Referee: Paweł Gil (Lublin)

== See also ==
- 2010–11 Ekstraklasa
