= Jairo =

Jairo is a common Spanish name. Notable people with this name include:

== People ==
=== Association football ===
- Francisco Jairo Silva Santos (born 1988), Brazilian footballer
- Jairo Aguirre (born 1956), Colombian footballer
- Jairo Álvarez Gutiérrez (born 1986), Spanish footballer
- Jairo Ampudia (born 1966), Colombian footballer
- Jairo Arboleda (born 1947), Colombian footballer
- Jairo Arias (born 1938), Colombian footballer
- Jairo Arreola (born 1985), Guatemalan footballer
- Jairo Arrieta (born 1983), Costa Rican footballer
- Jairo de Assis Almeida (1904–1997), Brazilian footballer
- Jairo Luis Blumer (born 1986), Brazilian footballer
- Jairo Campos (born 1984), Ecuadorian footballer
- Jairo Castillo (born 1977), Colombian footballer
- Jairo Henríquez (born 1993), Salvadorian footballer
- Jairo Jiménez (born 1993), Panamanian footballer
- Jairo de Macedo da Silva (born 1992), Brazilian footballer
- Jairo Montaño (born 1979), Ecuadorian footballer
- Jairo Martínez (born 1978), Honduran footballer
- Jairo do Nascimento (1946–2019), Brazilian footballer
- Jairo Neto (born 1994), Brazilian/East Timorese footballer
- Jairo Palomino (born 1988), Colombian footballer
- Jairo Patiño (born 1978), Colombian footballer
- Jairo Pérez (born 1976), Guatemalan footballer
- Jairo Puerto (born 1988), Honduran footballer
- Jaïro Riedewald (born 1996), Dutch footballer
- Jairo Samperio (born 1993), Spanish footballer
- Jairo Sanchez-Scott (born 1987), Cayman Islands footballer
- Jairo Suárez (born 1985), Colombian footballer
- John Jairo Castillo (born 1984), Colombian footballer
- John Jairo Culma (born 1981), Colombian footballer
- John Jairo Ruiz (born 1994), Costa Rican footballer
- John Jairo Tréllez (born 1968), Colombian footballer
- John Jairo Ulloque (born 1986), Colombian footballer
- Juan Jairo Galeano (born 1962), Colombian footballer

=== Other ===
- Jairo (born 1949), Argentine singer
- Jairo Clopatofsky (born 1961), Colombian politician
- Jairo Cossio (born 1970), Colombian weightlifter
- Jairo Duzant (born 1979), sprinter from the Netherlands Antilles
- Jairo Guedz, lead guitar player of Brazilian heavy metal band Sepultura
- Jairo Hernández (born 1972), Colombian cyclist
- Jairo Labourt (born 1994), Dominican baseball pitcher
- Jairo Miguel (born 1993), Spanish bullfighter
- Jairo Penaranda (born 1958), American football running back
- Jairo Pérez (born 1973), Colombian track and road cyclist
- Jairo Salas (born 1984), Colombian road cyclist
- Jairo Varela (born 1949), Colombian musician, composer and songwriter of Salsa music and other tropical genres
