= 1998 UEFA European Under-18 Championship =

1998 Ευρωπαϊκό πρωτάθλημα ποδοσφαίρου Κ-18 (in Greek)

Tournament details
- Host country: Cyprus
- Dates: 19–26 July
- Teams: 8 (from 1 confederation)
- Venue: 6 (in 4 host cities)

Final positions
- Champions: Republic of Ireland (1st title)
- Runners-up: Germany
- Third place: Croatia
- Fourth place: Portugal

Tournament statistics
- Matches played: 14
- Goals scored: 45 (3.21 per match)
- Top scorer(s): (Germany) Enrico Kern (4 goals)

The UEFA European Under-18 Championship 1998 Final Tournament was held in Cyprus. It also served as the European qualification for the 1999 FIFA World Youth Championship. For this tournament, the age limit was moved back from August to January. Players born on or after 1 January 1979 were eligible to participate in this competition.

== Qualification ==
50 UEFA nations entered the competition, and with the hosts Cyprus qualifying automatically, the other 49 teams competed in the qualifying competition to determine the remaining seven spots in the final tournament. The qualifying competition consisted of two rounds: First round, which took place in autumn 1997 and was played in 14 round-robin tournament groups with three or four teams each; and the Second round, which took place in spring 1998, in which pairs of group winners played home and away matches.

The following teams qualified for the final tournament.

Team	Method of qualification	Appearance	Last appearance	Previous best performance
Cyprus	Hosts	1st	—	Debut
Croatia	Second round winners	1st	—	Debut
England	Second round winners		1996 (third place)	Champions (1948, 1963, 1964, 1971, 1972, 1973, 1975, 1980, 1993)
Germany	Second round winners		1994 (runners-up)	Champions (1965^{2}, 1970^{2}, 1981^{1}, 1986^{2})
Lithuania	Second round winners	1st	—	Debut
Portugal	Second round winners		1997 (runners-up)	Champions (1961, 1994)
Republic of Ireland	Second round winners		1997 (fourth place)	Fourth place (1984, 1997)
Spain	Second round winners		1997 (third place)	Champions (1952, 1954, 1995)

1 = as West Germany
2 = as East Germany

== Match officials ==
A total of 6 referees, 7 assistant referees and 2 fourth officials officiated the tournament.

Referees

- (France) Pascal Garibian
- (Russia) Valentin Ivanov
- (Belgium) Eric Romain
- (Romania) Adrian Stoica
- (Netherlands) Jan Wegereef
- (Malta) Emanuel Raphael Zammit

Assistant referees

- (Albania) Astrit Dervishi
- (Azerbaijan) Ramiz Asadov
- (Czech Republic) Jiří Vodička
- (Latvia) Adolfs Supe
- (Cyprus) Michael Argyrou
- (Cyprus) Stavrou Stavros
- (Cyprus) Antonis Papanayotou

Fourth officials

- (Cyprus) Michael Karaiskakis
- (Cyprus) Yiannakis Kyprianides

== Squads ==
Each national team submitted a squad of 18 players, including two goalkeepers.

== Group stage ==
=== Group A ===
Teams	Pld	W	D	L	GF	GA	GD	Pts
Germany	3	2	0	1	11	4	+7	6
Portugal	3	2	0	1	5	2	+3	6
Spain	3	2	0	1	5	6	–1	6
Lithuania	3	0	0	3	2	11	–9	0

19 July 1998

Lithuania	1–7	Germany
Trakys 53'	Report	Majunke 8'; Kern 65', 90'; Timm 66'; Voss 71'; Gensler 75'; Ernst 80'

Antonis Papadopoulos Stadium, Larnaca
Attendance: 200
Referee: Adrian Stoica (Romania)
19 July 1998

Spain	2–1	Portugal
Gerard 49'; Couñago 71'	Report	Carreira 64'

GSZ Stadium, Larnaca
Attendance: 50
Referee: Jan Wegereef (Netherlands)

21 July 1998

Portugal	2–0	Lithuania
Marco Almeida 29', 83'	Report

Ammochostos Stadium, Larnaca
Attendance: 60
Referee: Valentin Ivanov (Russia)
21 July 1998

Germany	4–1	Spain
Deisler 4', 27'; Kern 16', 19'	Report	Barkero 20'

GSZ Stadium, Larnaca
Attendance: 600
Referee: Pascal Garibian (France)

23 July 1998

Portugal	2–0	Germany
Simão 30'; Marco Almeida 43'	Report

GSZ Stadium, Larnaca
Attendance: 200
Referee: Eric Romain (Belgium)
23 July 1998

Spain	2–1	Lithuania
Gerard 88', 89'	Report	Alunderis 54'

Antonis Papadopoulos Stadium, Larnaca
Attendance: 200
Referee: Emanuel Raphael Zammit (Malta)

=== Group B ===
Teams	Pld	W	D	L	GF	GA	GD	Pts
Republic of Ireland	3	2	0	1	8	3	+5	6
Croatia	3	2	0	1	8	5	+3	6
England	3	2	0	1	3	4	–1	6
Cyprus	3	0	0	3	1	8	–7	0

19 July 1998

Croatia	2–5	Republic of Ireland
Deranja 25'; Bjelanović 39'	Report	George 2', 90'; Keane 10'; McPhail 45'; Patridge 66'

Municipal Stadium, Ayia Napa
Attendance: 500
Referee: Eric Romain (Belgium)
19 July 1998

England	2–1	Cyprus
Matthews	Report	Woodgate 19' (o.g.)

Paralimni Stadium, Paralimni
Attendance: 4,000
Referee: Valentin Ivanov (Russia)

21 July 1998

Croatia	3–0	Cyprus
Mikić 37'; Vranješ 41'; Lovrek 90'	Report

Paralimni Stadium, Paralimni
Attendance: 250
Referee: Emanuel Raphael Zammit (Malta)
21 July 1998

England	1–0	Republic of Ireland
Smith 85'	Report

Anagennisi Football Ground, Deryneia
Attendance: 4,000
Referee: Jan Wegereef (Netherlands)

23 July 1998

Croatia	3–0	England
Banović 38' (pen.); Mikić 79', 90'	Report

Anagennisi Football Ground, Deryneia
Attendance: 2,500
Referee: Adrian Stoica (Romania)
23 July 1998

Republic of Ireland	3–0	Cyprus
B. Quinn 19'; Keane 45', 78'	Report

Municipal Stadium, Ayia Napa
Attendance: 1,500
Referee: Pascal Garibian (France)

== Third place match ==
26 July 1998

Portugal	0–0 (a.e.t.)	Croatia
	Report
Penalties
	4–5

GSZ Stadium, Larnaca
Attendance: 400
Referee: Valentin Ivanov (Russia)

== Final ==
26 July 1998
19:30

Republic of Ireland	1–1 (a.e.t.)	Germany
A. Quinn 70'	Report	Gensler 90'
Penalties
	4–3

GSZ Stadium, Larnaca
Attendance: 2,500
Referee: Eric Romain (Belgium)

== Qualification to World Youth Championship ==
The six best performing teams qualified for the 1999 FIFA World Youth Championship.

- Croatia
- England
- Germany
- Portugal
- Republic of Ireland
- Spain

== Goalscorers ==
There were 45 goals scored in 14 matches, for an average of 3.21 goals per match.

4 goals

- (Germany) Enrico Kern

3 goals

- (Croatia) Mihael Mikić
- (Spain) Gerard
- (Republic of Ireland) Robbie Keane
- (Portugal) Marco Almeida

2 goals

- (England) Lee Matthews
- (Germany) Sebastian Deisler
- (Germany) Andreas Gensler
- (Republic of Ireland) Liam George

1 goal

- (Croatia) Branko Banović
- (Croatia) Saša Bjelanović
- (Croatia) Zvonimir Deranja
- (Croatia) Krunoslav Lovrek
- (Croatia) Jurica Vranješ
- (England) Alan Smith
- (Spain) José Barkero
- (Spain) Pablo Couñago
- (Germany) Fabian Ernst
- (Germany) Wolf-Manuel Majunke
- (Germany) Christian Timm
- (Germany) Andreas Voss
- (Republic of Ireland) Alan Quinn
- (Republic of Ireland) Barry Quinn
- (Republic of Ireland) Stephen McPhail
- (Republic of Ireland) Richie Partridge
- (Lithuania) Vidas Alunderis
- (Lithuania) Valdas Trakys
- (Portugal) Hugo Carreira
- (Portugal) Simão

1 own goal

- (England) Jonathan Woodgate (against Cyprus)

== See also ==
- 1998 UEFA European Under-18 Championship qualifying
