= Sławomir Majak =

Polish footballer and manager

Personal information
- Date of birth: 12 January 1969 (age 57)
- Place of birth: Gidle, Poland
- Height: 1.85 m (6 ft 1 in)
- Positions: Striker; midfielder

Team information
- Current team: Siarka Tarnobrzeg (manager)

Youth career
- Start Gidle
- RKS Radomsko

Senior career*
Years	Team	Apps	(Gls)
1988–1989	ŁKS Łódź	13	(1)
1989–1992	Igloopol Dębica		
1992	Köping FF		
1993–1995	Zagłębie Lubin	93	(32)
1996	Hannover 96	13	(1)
1996–1997	Widzew Łódź	31	(12)
1997–2001	Hansa Rostock	108	(15)
2001–2002	Anorthosis Famagusta	28	(8)
2003	Piotrcovia Piotrków Trybunalski	5	(0)
2003–2004	Anorthosis Famagusta	15	(0)
2005–2006	RKS Radomsko	20	(0)
2006	Concordia Piotrków Trybunalski		

International career
1995–2000	Poland	22	(0)

Managerial career
- 2005: RKS Radomsko
- 2005–2008: Concordia Piotrków Trybunalski
- 2008–2009: Orlicz Suchedniów
- 2009: Ceramika Opoczno
- 2010: Świt Kamieńsk
- 2010–2011: Concordia Piotrków Trybunalski
- 2011: Lechia Tomaszów Mazowiecki
- 2012: Concordia Piotrków Trybunalski
- 2012: Czarni Żagań
- 2012–2013: Calisia Kalisz
- 2013: Orlicz Suchedniów
- 2015–2016: Pelikan Niechanowo
- 2016: Olimpia Zambrów (caretaker)
- 2016: MKS Ełk
- 2016–2017: Drwęca Nowe Miasto Lubawskie
- 2017–2018: Sokół Ostróda
- 2018: Unia Swarzędz
- 2018–2019: Sokół Aleksandrów Łódzki
- 2019: KKS 1925 Kalisz
- 2019: KSZO Ostrowiec Świętokrzyski
- 2020–2022: Siarka Tarnobrzeg
- 2023–2024: RKS Radomsko
- 2024: Pilica Przedbórz
- 2024–2025: Karkonosze Jelenia Góra
- 2025–: Siarka Tarnobrzeg
- * Club domestic league appearances and goals

Sławomir Majak (born 12 January 1969) is a Polish professional football manager and former player, currently in charge of III liga club Siarka Tarnobrzeg. In 1997, he was voted the Polish Footballer of the Year.

== Managerial statistics ==
As of match played 10 June 2026

Managerial record by team and tenure
Team	From	To	Record							
Team	From	To	G	W	D	L	GF	GA	GD	Win %
RKS Radomsko	5 October 2004	1 March 2005	6	2	1	3	10	11	−1	33.33
RKS Radomsko (Note: Does not include eight III liga results, voided following RKS' withdrawal from the competition.)	July 2005	25 November 2005	1	0	0	1	0	3	−3	0.00
Concordia Piotrków Trybunalski	26 November 2005	13 October 2008	109	56	20	33	193	123	+70	51.38
Orlicz Suchedniów	17 November 2008	30 June 2009	16	5	3	8	18	20	−2	31.25
Ceramika Opoczno	8 July 2009	10 July 2009	0	0	0	0	0	0	+0	—
Świt Kamieńsk	5 July 2010	27 September 2010	9	7	0	2	27	11	+16	77.78
Concordia Piotrków Trybunalski	27 September 2010	30 June 2011	23	5	3	15	20	48	−28	21.74
Lechia Tomaszów Mazowiecki	4 July 2011	21 August 2011	2	0	1	1	1	2	−1	0.00
Concordia Piotrków Trybunalski	17 March 2012	25 June 2012	16	7	1	8	23	23	+0	43.75
Czarni Żagań	25 June 2012	5 July 2012	0	0	0	0	0	0	+0	—
Calisia Kalisz	8 July 2012	23 July 2013	35	13	5	17	34	46	−12	37.14
Orlicz Suchedniów	July 2013	16 November 2013	16	11	4	1	36	14	+22	68.75
Pelikan Niechanowo	13 October 2015	20 April 2016	13	9	2	2	29	12	+17	69.23
Olimpia Zambrów (caretaker)	16 August 2016	1 September 2016	3	1	1	1	1	3	−2	33.33
MKS Ełk	15 September 2016	30 November 2016	11	3	3	5	21	18	+3	27.27
Drwęca Nowe Miasto Lubawskie	3 December 2016	18 July 2017	20	14	3	3	47	15	+32	70.00
Sokół Ostróda	5 September 2017	30 April 2018	21	7	6	8	32	24	+8	33.33
Unia Swarzędz	8 May 2018	2 June 2018	4	4	0	0	15	4	+11	100.00
Sokół Aleksandrów Łódzki	25 June 2018	2 April 2019	25	16	5	4	42	23	+19	64.00
KKS 1925 Kalisz	7 May 2019	30 June 2019	9	4	2	3	18	13	+5	44.44
KSZO Ostrowiec Świętokrzyski	30 August 2019	31 December 2019	16	7	5	4	20	13	+7	43.75
Siarka Tarnobrzeg	16 December 2020	22 August 2022	64	32	14	18	106	70	+36	50.00
RKS Radomsko	10 July 2023	20 June 2024	37	23	7	7	84	33	+51	62.16
Pilica Przedbórz	24 July 2024	24 October 2024	13	3	0	10	19	39	−20	23.08
Karkonosze Jelenia Góra	24 October 2024	30 June 2025	25	9	9	7	31	24	+7	36.00
Siarka Tarnobrzeg	1 July 2025	Present	41	17	10	14	103	56	+47	41.46
Total			535	255	105	175	930	648	+282	47.66

== Honours ==
=== Player ===
Widzew Łódź

- Ekstraklasa: 1996–97

Anorthosis Famagusta

- Cypriot Cup: 2001–02

Individual

- Piłka Nożna Polish Footballer of the Year: 1997

=== Manager ===
Concordia Piotrków Trybunalski

- IV liga Łódź: 2005–06

Drwęca Nowe Miasto Lubawskie

- III liga, group I: 2016–17

Siarka Tarnobrzeg

- III liga, group IV: 2021–22
- Polish Cup (Subcarpathia regionals): 2025–26
- Polish Cup (Stalowa Wola regionals): 2025–26

Karkonosze Jelenia Góra

- Polish Cup (Jelenia Góra regionals): 2024–25
