= 1995 UEFA European Under-16 Championship =

1995 UEFA Under-16 Championship
Europees kampioenschap voetbal onder 16 – 1995 Championnat d'Europe de football des moins de 16 ans 1995 U-16-Fußball-Europameisterschaft 1995

Tournament details
- Host country: Belgium
- Dates: 24 April – 6 May
- Teams: 16 (from 1 confederation)

Final positions
- Champions: Portugal (2nd title)
- Runners-up: Spain
- Third place: Germany
- Fourth place: France

Tournament statistics
- Matches played: 32
- Goals scored: 81 (2.53 per match)

The 1995 UEFA European Under-16 Championship was the 13th edition of UEFA's European Under-16 Football Championship. Players born on or after 1 August 1978 were eligible to participate in this competition. Belgium hosted the tournament, during 24 April – 6 May 1995. 16 teams contested.

Turkey unsuccessfully defended its title in Group Stage.

Portugal defeated Spain to win their second but not consecutive title. By finishing third, Germany qualified alongside the two finalists for the 1995 U-17 World Championship held later that year in Ecuador.

== Participants ==
- Austria
- Belgium
- Czech Republic
- England
- France
- Germany
- Italy
- Norway
- Poland
- Portugal
- Scotland
- Slovenia
- Slovakia
- Spain
- Sweden
- Turkey

== Group stage ==
=== Group A ===
Team	Pld	W	D	L	GF	GA	GD	Pts
Czech Republic	3	3	0	0	7	2	+5	9
Sweden	3	1	1	1	3	5	−2	4
Italy	3	0	2	1	1	2	−1	2
Poland	3	0	1	2	1	3	−2	1

24 April 1995

Poland	1–2	Czech Republic

Meulebeke

24 April 1995

Sweden	1–1	Italy

Meulebeke

26 April 1995

Poland	0–1	Sweden

Handzame

26 April 1995

Czech Republic	1–0	Italy

Handzame

28 April 1995

Italy	0–0	Poland

Eernegem

28 April 1995

Czech Republic	4–1	Sweden

Maldegem

=== Group B ===
Team	Pld	W	D	L	GF	GA	GD	Pts
Belgium	3	2	1	0	7	1	+6	7
France	3	2	0	1	6	4	+2	6
Austria	3	1	1	1	1	1	0	4
Norway	3	0	0	3	0	8	−8	0

24 April 1995

Belgium	4–1	France

Eisden

24 April 1995

Norway	0–1	Austria

Eisden

26 April 1995

Belgium	3–0	Norway

Hasselt

26 April 1995

France	1–0	Austria

Hasselt

28 April 1995

Austria	0–0	Belgium

Tongeren

28 April 1995

France	4–0	Norway

Verviers

=== Group C ===
Team	Pld	W	D	L	GF	GA	GD	Pts
Spain	3	3	0	0	8	1	+7	9
Germany	3	2	0	1	7	4	+3	6
Turkey	3	1	0	2	3	6	−3	3
Slovenia	3	0	0	3	1	8	−7	0

24 April 1995

Slovenia	0–2	Turkey

Aalter

24 April 1995

Germany	0–3	Spain

Aalter

26 April 1995

Slovenia	0–3	Germany

Deinze

26 April 1995

Turkey	0–2	Spain

Deinze

28 April 1995

Spain	3–1	Slovenia

Eernegem

28 April 1995

Turkey	1–4	Germany

Maldegem

=== Group D ===
Team	Pld	W	D	L	GF	GA	GD	Pts
England	3	2	1	0	6	3	+3	7
Portugal	3	2	0	1	8	4	+4	6
Slovakia	3	1	0	2	3	7	−4	3
Scotland	3	0	1	2	3	6	−3	1

24 April 1995
19:00

Scotland	1–1	England

Eupen

24 April 1995

Portugal	4–0	Slovakia
Brito 52', 61'; Vítor Pereira 68'; Zeferino 80'	Report

Eupen

26 April 1995
17:00

Scotland	1–3	Portugal
Watt 73'	Report	Zeferino 10', 76'; Cordeiro 34'

Stade Communal De Bielmont, Verviers
Referee: Alfredo Trentalange (Italy)

26 April 1995

England	2–1	Slovakia

Stade Communal De Bielmont, Verviers

28 April 1995
19:30

England	3–1	Portugal
Morris 56'; Clement 61'; Wright 76'	Report	Curtis 25' (o.g.)

Stade Communal De Bielmont Verviers

28 April 1995

Slovakia	2–1	Scotland

Tongeren

== Knockout stages ==
Quarter-finals
1 May – Eupen
England	0
France (aet)	1
1 May – Roeselare
Sweden	0
Spain	1
1 May – Eupen
Belgium	0
Portugal	1
1 May – Roeselare
Czech Republic	0
Germany	2

Semi-finals
3 May – Seraing
France	0
Spain	2
3 May – Geel
Portugal	3
Germany	1

Final
6 May – Brussels
Spain	0
Portugal	2
Third place
6 May – Brussels
France	1
Germany (aet)	2

=== Quarterfinals ===
1 May 1995

Czech Republic	0–2	Germany

Roeselare

1 May 1995

Spain	1–0	Sweden

Roeselare

1 May 1995
17:00

Belgium	0–1	Portugal
		Cordeiro 40'

Eupen

1 May 1995

England	0 – 1 (a.e.t.)	France

Eupen

=== Semifinals ===
3 May 1995

Germany	1–3	Portugal
Bugera 66'		Vargas 7'; Cordeiro 53'; Zeferino 79'

Geel
Referee: Ľuboš Micheľ (Slovakia)

3 May 1995

Spain	2–0	France

Seraing
Referee: Jacek Granat (Poland)

=== Third Place Playoff ===
6 May 1995

Germany	2–1 (a.e.t.)	France

Brussels
Referee: Nilsson (Sweden)

=== Final ===
6 May 1995
17:00

Portugal	2–0	Spain
Zeferino 49'; Pereira 69'

Brussels
Referee: Fernand Meese (Belgium)
