= Krzysztof Kaczmarek =

Polish footballer

Personal information
- Full name: Krzysztof Jacek Kaczmarek
- Date of birth: 27 October 1988 (age 38)
- Place of birth: Wrocław, Poland
- Height: 1.80 m (5 ft 11 in)
- Position: Midfielder

Team information
- Current team: SV Edelweiß Arnstedt
- Number: 4

Youth career
- 2005: Śląsk Wrocław

Senior career*
Years	Team	Apps	(Gls)
2006–2007	Śląsk Wrocław II		
2007–2010	Śląsk Wrocław	2	(1)
2008	→ GKP Gorzów Wlkp. (loan)	13	(1)
2010	→ Ślęza Wrocław (loan)	15	(0)
2010	→ Czarni Żagań (loan)	16	(2)
2011–2012	MKS Kluczbork	34	(2)
2012–2013	Chrobry Głogów	10	(0)
2013	Calisia Kalisz	3	(0)
2022–	SV Edelweiß Arnstedt	45	(10)
- * Club domestic league appearances and goals as of 18 October 2024

Krzysztof Jacek Kaczmarek (born 27 October 1988) is a Polish footballer who plays as a midfielder for German club SV Edelweiß Arnstedt.

== Career ==
In January 2011, he moved to MKS Kluczbork.

== Honours ==
GKP Gorzów Wielkopolski

- III liga, group III: 2007–08

Śląsk Wrocław

- Ekstraklasa Cup: 2008–09
