= Jorge Cordeiro =

Portuguese football coach and former player

Personal information
- Full name: Jorge Manuel Pinto Cordeiro
- Date of birth: 2 September 1978 (age 48)
- Place of birth: Portalegre, Portugal
- Height: 1.72 m (5 ft 8 in)
- Position: Midfielder

Team information
- Current team: Benfica B (assistant)

Youth career
- 1987–1990: Estrela de Portalegre
- 1990–1997: Benfica

Senior career*
| Years | Team | Apps | (Gls) |
| 1997–1998 | → Olivais (loan) | | |
| 1998–1999 | Portimonense | 27 | (4) |
| 1999–2001 | Benfica B | 65 | (20) |
| 2001–2002 | Seixal | 33 | (3) |
| 2002–2003 | Barreirense | 30 | (3) |
| 2003–2004 | Torreense | 13 | (1) |
| 2004–2005 | Oriental | 28 | (2) |
| 2005–2012 | AD Oeiras | | |
| 2012–2013 | Follo 2 | 7 | (1) |
| 2012–2013 | Follo | 28 | (1) |

International career
| 1994 | Portugal U15 | 7 | (2) |
| 1994–1995 | Portugal U16 | 12 | (3) |
| 1995 | Portugal U17 | 4 | (0) |
| 1996–1997 | Portugal U18 | 11 | (6) |

Managerial career
- 2012: Ski (youth)
- 2022–: Benfica B (assistant)
Medal record
Representing Portugal
Men's Football
UEFA European Under-16 Championship
| Gold medal – first place | Portugal 1995 | Team |
- * Club domestic league appearances and goals

Jorge Manuel Pinto Cordeiro (born 2 September 1978) is a Portuguese professional football coach and former player who played as a midfielder, primarily in Portugal's lower leagues. He had a brief spell in Norwegian football before retiring.

== Club career ==
Born in Portalegre, Portugal, Cordeiro joined his hometown team, Sport Clube Estrela, (better known as Estrela de Portalegre), at the age of seven. In 1991, he moved to S.L. Benfica, where he was assigned to their youth system. In the 1997–98 season, he was loaned to S.L. Olivais.

After one season in Portimão, Cordeiro returned to Benfica to play in the reserve team in 1999. On 4 October 2000, he was called up by first-team coach José Mourinho for a friendly match against Olympique de Marseille. In November, he received another call, this time for a Primeira Liga match against Vitória de Guimarães, but would instead remain on the bench, subsequently returning to the B-side.

On 30 May 2012, Cordeiro signed for Norwegian side Follo FK.

== International career ==
Cordeiro helped the Portugal under-16s win the UEFA European Championship. He scored three times, including his solo goal against hosts Belgium in the quarter-finals and one in the semi-final against Germany.

Later that year, he was named in the Portugal under-17 squad for the 1995 FIFA U-17 World Championship, playing four games before an eventual quarter-final exit.

In 1997, he represented the under-18 side in the UEFA European Under-18 Championship, held in Iceland. Portugal reached the final, losing 1–0 against France.

Four categories comprised, Cordeiro amassed 34 caps and scored 11 goals.

== Coaching career ==
While playing for AD Oeiras, Cordeiro earned his UEFA 'C' and 'B' Licences. While he was playing for Follo, he started coaching the under-14s of his local team, Ski IL.

== Club statistics ==
| Club | Season | League | | Cup | | Total | |
| Club | Season | Apps | Goals | Apps | Goals | Apps | Goals |
|---|---|---|---|---|---|---|---|
| Follo 2 | 2012 | 3 | 1 | – | | 3 | 1 |
| Follo 2 | 2013 | 4 | 0 | – | | 4 | 0 |
| Follo 2 | Total | 7 | 1 | – | | 7 | 1 |
| Follo | 2012 | 15 | 1 | 0 | 0 | 15 | 1 |
| Follo | 2013 | 14 | 0 | – | | 14 | 0 |
| Follo | Total | 29 | 1 | 2 | 0 | 29 | 1 |

== Honours ==
=== Club ===
Oeiras

- AF Lisboa 1ª Divisão Honra: 2008–09

Follo

- 2. divisjon: 2012

=== Country ===
Portugal

- UEFA European Under-16 Championship: 1995
- UEFA European Under-18 Championship: Runner-up 1997
