= 1998 UEFA European Under-18 Championship qualifying =

Football tournament qualification stage

This article features the 1998 UEFA European Under-18 Championship qualifying stage. Matches were played 1997 through 1998. Two qualifying rounds were organised and seven teams qualified for the main tournament, joining host Cyprus.

== First round ==
=== Group 1 ===
All matches were played in Portugal.

Teams	Pld	W	D	L	GF	GA	GD	Pts
Portugal	3	3	0	0	7	3	+4	9
Hungary	3	2	0	1	8	3	+5	6
Slovenia	3	1	0	2	3	7	–4	3
Bulgaria	3	0	0	3	3	8	–5	0

Hungary	4–1	Bulgaria
Portugal	3–1	Slovenia
Slovenia	2–1	Bulgaria
Portugal	2–1	Hungary
Portugal	2–1	Bulgaria
Hungary	3–0	Slovenia

=== Group 2 ===
All matches were played in the Czech Republic.

Teams	Pld	W	D	L	GF	GA	GD	Pts
Armenia	3	2	1	0	9	4	+5	7
Slovakia	3	1	2	0	11	6	+5	5
Czech Republic	3	1	1	1	8	8	0	4
Albania	3	0	0	3	3	13	–10	0

Armenia	4–0	Albania
Slovakia	3–3	Czech Republic
Armenia	4–3	Czech Republic
Slovakia	7–2	Albania
Czech Republic	2–1	Albania
Armenia	1–1	Slovakia

=== Group 3 ===
Teams	Pld	W	D	L	GF	GA	GD	Pts
Greece	6	4	1	1	9	5	+4	13
Georgia	6	3	1	2	8	6	+2	10
Romania	6	3	0	3	12	9	+3	9
North Macedonia	6	1	0	5	8	17	–9	3

Romania	4–1	North Macedonia
Georgia	2–1	Romania
Greece	2–1	Georgia
North Macedonia	1–2	Georgia
Romania	2–0	Georgia
North Macedonia	0–2	Greece
Greece	4–1	North Macedonia
North Macedonia	5–2	Romania
Greece	1–0	Romania
Romania	3–0	Greece
Georgia	3–0	North Macedonia
Georgia	0–0	Greece

=== Group 4 ===
All matches were played in Moldova.

Teams	Pld	W	D	L	GF	GA	GD	Pts
Republic of Ireland	2	2	0	0	5	2	+3	6
Moldova	2	1	0	1	1	1	0	3
Azerbaijan	2	0	0	2	2	5	–3	0

Moldova	1–0	Azerbaijan
Republic of Ireland	4–2	Azerbaijan
Republic of Ireland	1–0	Moldova

=== Group 5 ===
Teams	Pld	W	D	L	GF	GA	GD	Pts
England	4	2	1	1	8	4	+4	7
FR Yugoslavia	4	1	2	1	5	6	–1	5
Russia	4	1	1	2	6	9	–3	4

England	0–0	FR Yugoslavia
FR Yugoslavia	0–4	England
FR Yugoslavia	3–0	Russia
Russia	2–1	England
Russia	2–2	FR Yugoslavia
England	3–2	Russia

=== Group 6 ===
All matches were played in France.

Teams	Pld	W	D	L	GF	GA	GD	Pts
France	3	3	0	0	9	1	+8	9
Scotland	3	2	0	1	9	5	+4	6
Denmark	3	1	0	2	4	7	–3	3
Bosnia and Herzegovina	3	0	0	3	0	9	–9	0

Scotland	1–5	France
Denmark	4–0	Bosnia and Herzegovina
France	2–0	Bosnia and Herzegovina
Scotland	5–0	Denmark
Bosnia and Herzegovina	0–3	Scotland
France	2–0	Denmark

=== Group 7 ===
All matches were played in Malta.

Teams	Pld	W	D	L	GF	GA	GD	Pts
Switzerland	3	3	0	0	10	0	+10	9
Ukraine	3	1	1	1	3	4	–1	4
Malta	3	1	1	1	2	5	–3	4
Luxembourg	3	0	0	3	1	7	–6	0

Malta	0–4	Switzerland
Ukraine	2–1	Luxembourg
Malta	1–1	Ukraine
Switzerland	4–0	Luxembourg
Malta	1–0	Luxembourg
Switzerland	2–0	Ukraine

=== Group 8 ===
All matches were played in Northern Ireland.

Teams	Pld	W	D	L	GF	GA	GD	Pts
Croatia	2	2	0	0	12	1	+11	6
Northern Ireland	2	1	0	1	6	2	+4	3
Andorra	2	0	0	2	0	15	–15	0

Croatia	2–1	Northern Ireland
Andorra	0–10	Croatia
Northern Ireland	5–0	Andorra

=== Group 9 ===
All matches were played in Israel.

Teams	Pld	W	D	L	GF	GA	GD	Pts
Israel	2	2	0	0	16	0	+16	6
Netherlands	2	1	0	1	12	2	+10	3
San Marino	2	0	0	2	0	26	–26	0

Israel	2–0	Netherlands
Netherlands	12–0	San Marino
Israel	14–0	San Marino

=== Group 10 ===
Teams	Pld	W	D	L	GF	GA	GD	Pts
Spain	4	4	0	0	10	2	+8	12
Italy	4	2	0	2	5	6	–1	6
Belgium	4	0	0	4	0	7	–7	0

Belgium	0–1	Italy
Spain	2–0	Belgium
Italy	2–0	Belgium
Spain	3–1	Italy
Belgium	0–2	Spain
Italy	1–3	Spain

=== Group 11 ===
All matches were played in Finland.

Teams	Pld	W	D	L	GF	GA	GD	Pts
Lithuania	3	2	1	0	7	4	+3	7
Finland	3	2	0	1	9	7	+2	6
Austria	3	1	1	1	6	5	+1	4
Iceland	3	0	0	3	2	8	–6	0

Finland	2–3	Lithuania
Austria	2–0	Iceland
Austria	1–1	Lithuania
Finland	3–1	Iceland
Finland	4–3	Austria
Iceland	1–3	Lithuania

=== Group 12 ===
All matches were played in Sweden.

Teams	Pld	W	D	L	GF	GA	GD	Pts
Turkey	3	2	1	0	4	1	+3	7
Sweden	3	2	0	1	5	2	+3	6
Belarus	3	1	0	2	2	6	–4	3
Latvia	3	0	1	2	2	4	–2	1

Sweden	4–0	Belarus
Latvia	1–1	Turkey
Belarus	2–1	Latvia
Turkey	2–0	Sweden
Sweden	1–0	Latvia
Turkey	1–0	Belarus

=== Group 13 ===
All matches were played in Norway.

Teams	Pld	W	D	L	GF	GA	GD	Pts
Poland	2	1	1	0	3	1	+2	4
Wales	2	1	1	0	4	3	+1	4
Norway	2	0	0	2	2	5	–3	0

Wales	3–2	Norway
Poland	1–1	Wales
Norway	0–2	Poland

=== Group 14 ===
All matches were played in Germany.

Teams	Pld	W	D	L	GF	GA	GD	Pts
Germany	2	2	0	0	11	1	+10	6
Estonia	2	0	1	1	2	5	–3	1
Faroe Islands	2	0	1	1	1	8	–7	1

Germany	4–1	Estonia
Estonia	1–1	Faroe Islands
Faroe Islands	0–7	Germany

== Second round ==
Team 1	Agg.	Team 2	1st leg	2nd leg
Portugal	4–1	Armenia	2–1	2–0
Greece	0–3	Republic of Ireland	0–1	0–2
England	3–1	France	3–0	0–1
Switzerland	0–2	Croatia	0–0	0–2
Israel	2–3	Spain	0–2	2–1
Turkey	2–3	Lithuania	2–0	0–3
Poland	2–2(a)	Germany	2–1	0–1

== See also ==
- 1998 UEFA European Under-18 Championship
