= Krzysztof Nykiel =

Polish footballer

Personal information
- Full name: Krzysztof Nykiel
- Date of birth: August 8, 1982 (age 44)
- Place of birth: Łódź, Poland
- Height: 1.86 m (6 ft 1 in)
- Position: Defender

Youth career
- 1998–1999: ŁKS Łódź

Senior career*
Years	Team	Apps	(Gls)
2000–2002	Piotrcovia Piotrków Trybunalski		
2002–2003	Korona Kielce		
2003–2004	Unia Janikowo		
2004–2005	Drwęca Nowe Miasto Lubawskie		
2005	Polonia Warsaw	6	(0)
2006	Radomiak Radom		
2007–2011	Ruch Chorzów	96	(1)
2011–2015	Cracovia	63	(2)
2015–2016	Zawisza Bydgoszcz	16	(0)
2016	Sokół Aleksandrów Łódzki	11	(0)
- * Club domestic league appearances and goals

Krzysztof Nykiel (born 8 August 1982) is a Polish former professional footballer who played as a defender.

== Career ==
=== Club ===
Nykiel made six appearances for Polonia Warsaw during the 2005–06 season, and made 21 appearances for Ruch during the 2007–08 season.

In June 2011, he moved to Cracovia on a three-year contract.

== Honours ==
Ruch Chorzów

- II liga: 2006–07
