= Damian Chmiel =

Polish footballer

Personal information
- Full name: Damian Chmiel
- Date of birth: 6 May 1987 (age 39)
- Place of birth: Wadowice, Poland
- Height: 1.74 m (5 ft 9 in)
- Position: Midfielder

Team information
- Current team: Orzeł Łękawica
- Number: 27

Senior career*
Years	Team	Apps	(Gls)
2006	Znicz Sułkowice Bolęcina		
2006–2008	Zapora Porąbka		
2008	Stal Bielsko-Biała	14	(5)
2009–2018	Podbeskidzie	170	(26)
2010	→ Pelikan Łowicz (loan)	14	(4)
2011–2012	→ GKS Katowice (loan)	27	(4)
2018–2023	Sandecja Nowy Sącz	145	(15)
2023–2024	Podbeskidzie II	27	(13)
2024–	Orzeł Łękawica	29	(24)
- * Club domestic league appearances and goals as of 22:51, 22 June 2025 (UTC)

Damian Chmiel (born 6 May 1987) is a Polish professional footballer who plays as a midfielder for IV liga Silesia club Orzeł Łękawica.

== Career ==
In February 2010, he was loaned to Pelikan Łowicz on a half-year deal. He returned to Podbeskidzie in the summer of 2010.

== Honours ==
Podbeskidzie II

- IV liga Silesia II: 2023–24

Orzeł Łękawica

- V liga Silesia II: 2024–25

Orzeł Łękawica II

- Polish Cup (Żywiec regionals): 2024–25
