= Jacek Popek =

Polish footballer

Personal information
- Full name: Jacek Popek
- Date of birth: 20 August 1978 (age 48)
- Place of birth: Płock, Poland
- Height: 1.82 m (6 ft 0 in)
- Position: Defender

Youth career
- 1992–1995: Petrochemia Płock

Senior career*
Years	Team	Apps	(Gls)
1995–2000	Petrochemia/Petro/Orlen Płock	100	(2)
2000–2012	GKS Bełchatów	251	(24)
2012–2013	Zawisza Bydgoszcz	1	(0)
2014–2015	Zjednoczeni Bełchatów		
2015–2017	Orkan Buczek		

International career
1995	Poland U16		
- * Club domestic league appearances and goals

Jacek Popek (born 20 August 1978) is a Polish former professional footballer who played as a defender.
