= Carlos García (footballer, born 1978) =

Ecuadorian footballer

Personal information
- Full name: Carlos Alberto García Charcopa
- Date of birth: September 24, 1978 (age 48)
- Place of birth: Esmeraldas, Ecuador
- Position: Forward

Team information
- Current team: River Plate

Senior career*
Years	Team	Apps	(Gls)
1999	Emelec	17	(?)
2001	Santa Rita	6	(?)
2001	LDU Portoviejo	13	(?)
2002	ESPOLI	22	(?)
2003	Deportivo Quito	10	(?)
2004	Deportivo Quevedo	19	(?)
2004	Macará	9	(?)
2005	Universidad Católica	13	(?)
2005	El Nacional	5	(?)
2007	Deportivo Azogues	22	(?)
2008	LDU Cuenca	19	(?)
2008	Técnico Universitario	9	(?)
2010	Audaz Octubrino	19	(?)
2010	Deportivo Quito	14	(?)
2011–	Barcelona	1	(0)
- * Club domestic league appearances and goals as of 30 January 2011

Carlos Alberto García Charcopa (born September 24, 1978 in Esmeraldas), sometimes known as El Pele, is an Ecuadorian football forward currently playing for River Plate.
