= Yuji Nakagawa =

Japanese footballer

Yuji Nakagawa 中川 雄二
Personal information
- Full name: Yuji Nakagawa
- Date of birth: October 22, 1978 (age 48)
- Place of birth: Ube, Yamaguchi, Japan
- Height: 1.78 m (5 ft 10 in)
- Position: Goalkeeper

Youth career
- 1997–2000: Meiji University

Senior career*
| Years | Team | Apps | (Gls) |
| 2001–2010 | Kataller Toyama | 302 | (0) |
| Total | | 302 | (0) |
Medal record
Representing Japan
AFC U-16 Championship
| Gold medal – first place | 1994 Qatar |
- * Club domestic league appearances and goals

Yuji Nakagawa (中川 雄二, Nakagawa Yuji; born October 22, 1978) is a former Japanese football player. He is the goalkeeper coach J2 League club of Ventforet Kofu.

== Club career ==
Nakagawa was born in Ube on October 22, 1978. After graduating from Meiji University, he joined Japan Football League club YKK (later YKK AP, Kataller Toyama) in 2001. He played as regular goalkeeper from first season. The club was promoted J2 League in 2009. He retired end of 2010 season.

== National team career ==
In August 1995, Nakagawa was elected for the Japan U-17 national team for 1995 U-17 World Championship, but he did not play a single minute during the championship.

== Club statistics ==
| Club performance | | | League | | Cup | | Total | |
| Season | Club | League | Apps | Goals | Apps | Goals | Apps | Goals |
| Japan | | | League | | Emperor's Cup | | Total | |
|---|---|---|---|---|---|---|---|---|
| 2001 | YKK | Football League | 30 | 0 | - | | 30 | 0 |
| 2002 | YKK | Football League | 17 | 0 | | | 17 | 0 |
| 2003 | YKK | Football League | 28 | 0 | - | | 28 | 0 |
| 2004 | YKK AP | Football League | 30 | 0 | - | | 30 | 0 |
| 2005 | YKK AP | Football League | 30 | 0 | - | | 30 | 0 |
| 2006 | YKK AP | Football League | 33 | 0 | 3 | 0 | 36 | 0 |
| 2007 | YKK AP | Football League | 30 | 0 | - | | 30 | 0 |
| 2008 | Kataller Toyama | Football League | 30 | 0 | 2 | 0 | 32 | 0 |
| 2009 | Kataller Toyama | J2 League | 46 | 0 | 1 | 0 | 47 | 0 |
| 2010 | Kataller Toyama | J2 League | 28 | 0 | 1 | 0 | 29 | 0 |
| Country | Japan | | 302 | 0 | 7 | 0 | 309 | 0 |
| Total | | | 302 | 0 | 7 | 0 | 309 | 0 |
