= Jairo Aguirre =

Colombian footballer (born 1956)

Personal information
- Full name: Jairo Aguirre Vargas
- Date of birth: 8 March 1956 (age 70)
- Position: Striker

Senior career*
| Years | Team | Apps | (Gls) |
| 1980–1982 | Deportivo Pereira | | |
| 1983–1984 | Deportes Tolima | | |

International career
| 1984 | Colombia | 2 | (0) |
- * Club domestic league appearances and goals

Jairo Aguirre Vargas (born 8 March 1956) is a Colombian former footballer who played as a striker.

== Career ==
Aguirre played for Deportivo Pereira and Deportes Tolima.

He made two international appearances for Colombia, in 1984.
