= Luke Staton =

English footballer

Personal information
- Date of birth: 10 March 1979 (age 47)
- Place of birth: Nottingham, England
- Height: 1.76 m (5 ft 9 in)
- Position: Midfielder

Senior career*
Years	Team	Apps	(Gls)
1998–1999	Blackburn Rovers	0	(0)
1999–2000	Bolton Wanderers	0	(0)
2000–2001	Barry Town United		
2001–2002	Merthyr Tydfil		
2002–2005	Gainsborough Trinity		
2005–2008	Worksop Town		
2008	Retford Town F.C.		

International career
- England U16
- * Club domestic league appearances and goals

Luke Staton (born 10 March 1979) is an English former professional footballer who played as a midfielder.

== Career ==
Staton made his single professional appearance in an EFL Cup match between Bolton Wanderers and Gillingham on 21 September 1999.
