= Abdulaziz Karim =

Qatari footballer (born 1979)

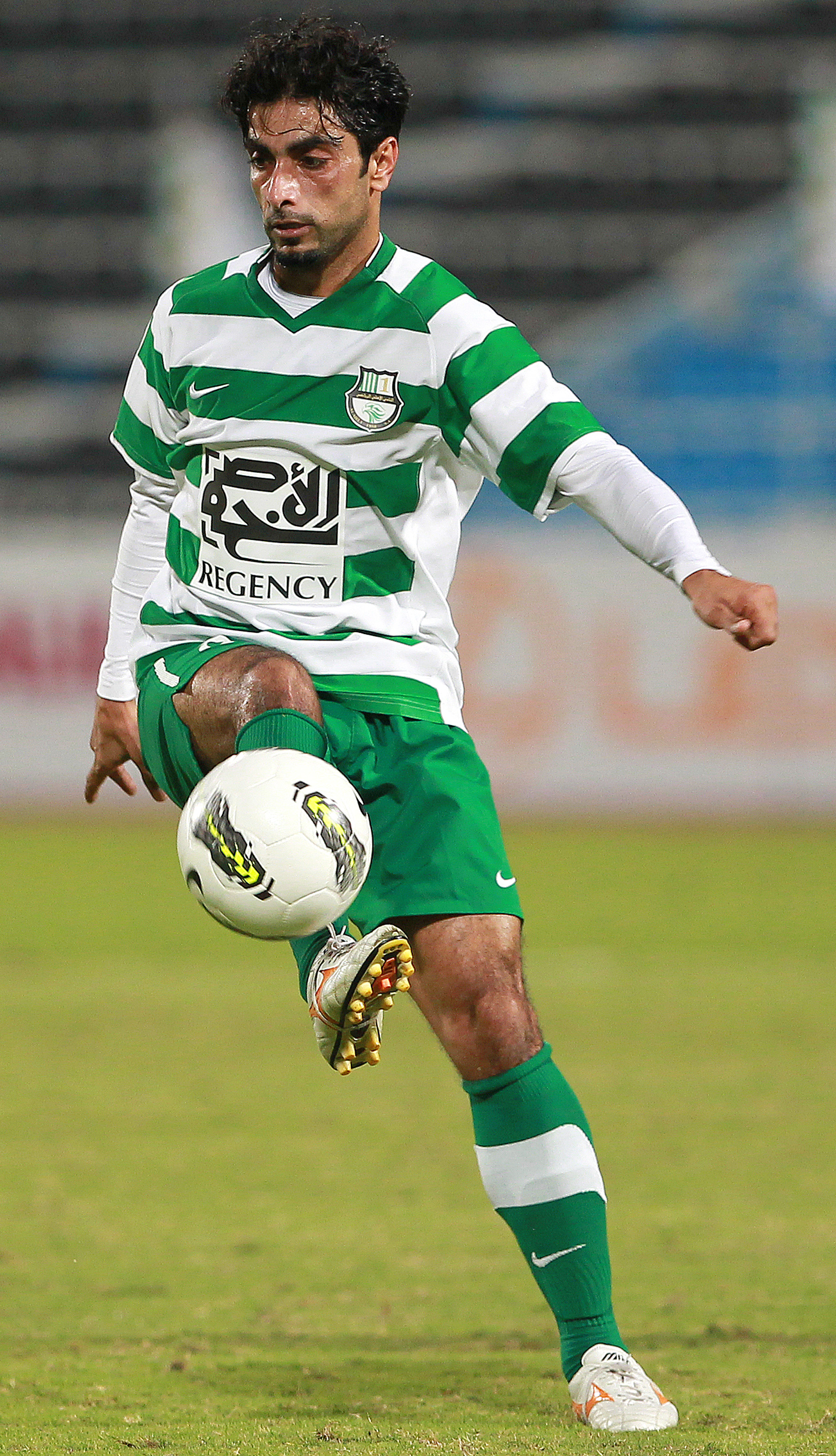

Personal information
- Full name: Abdulaziz Karim Dad
- Date of birth: December 20, 1979 (age 46)
- Place of birth: Umm Sa'id, Qatar
- Height: 1.71 m (5 ft 7 1/2 in)
- Position: Midfielder

Senior career*
Years	Team	Apps	(Gls)
1997–2009	Al Arabi	201	(15)
2009–2011	Umm Salal	11	(0)
2011–2012	Al Ahli	18	(0)
2012–2014	Al Kharaitiyat		

International career^{‡}
2001–2007	Qatar	10	(0)
- * Club domestic league appearances and goals as of 9 July 2012 ‡ National team caps and goals as of 29 December 2011

Abdul Aziz Karim Dad (born 20 December 1979 in Umm Sa'id) is a Qatari footballer, who currently plays for Al Kharaitiyat SC.

== Career ==
The midfielder joined in summer 2009 from Al-Arabi to league rival Umm Salal Sport Club. In July 2012, Karim moved to Al-Kharaitiyat from relegated Al-Ahly Doha.

Karim played for Qatar at the 1995 FIFA U-17 World Championship in Ecuador. He won from 2001 to 2007 ten caps for the Qatar national football team.
