= John Ulloque =

Colombian footballer (born 1986)

Personal information
- Full name: John Jairo Ulloque Pérez
- Date of birth: May 11, 1986 (age 40)
- Place of birth: Puerto Wilches, Santander, Colombia
- Height: 1.70 m (5 ft 7 in)
- Position: Midfielder

Team information
- Current team: Olympic Club Deportivo
- Number: 10

Senior career*
Years	Team	Apps	(Gls)
2006–2007	Deportivo Rionegro		
2008–2009	Atlético Bucaramanga	30	(4)
2010–present	Millonarios	28	(5)
- * Club domestic league appearances and goals as of November 14, 2010

John Jairo Ulloque Pérez (born May 11, 1986) is a Colombian football midfield, who currently plays for Millonarios in Categoría Primera A.

== Statistics (Official games/Colombian Ligue and Colombian Cup) ==
(As of November 14, 2010)

Year	Team	Colombian Ligue Matches	Goals	Colombian Cup Matches	Goals	Total Matches	Total Goals
2010	Millonarios	28	5	11	2	39	7
Total	Millonarios	28	5	11	2	39	7
