= Fausto González =

Costa Rican footballer (born 1978)

Personal information
- Full name: Fausto González Sibaja
- Date of birth: 13 September 1978 (age 48)
- Place of birth: Ciudad Quesada, Costa Rica
- Height: 1.80 m (5 ft 11 in)
- Position: Goalkeeper

Senior career*
| Years | Team | Apps | (Gls) |
| 1997–1999 | Cartaginés | | |
| 2000–2002 | Herediano | | |
| 2002–2005 | San Carlos | | |
| 2005–2012 | Saprissa | | |

International career
| 1995 | Costa Rica U-17 | | |
| 1997 | Costa Rica U-20 | | |
- * Club domestic league appearances and goals

Fausto González Sibaja (born 13 September 1978) is a former Costa Rican footballer who played as goalkeeper. He is known as El Golero Loco for his attempts to confuse rivals during penalty shots.

== Club career ==
Before signing with Saprissa, González played for several teams in Costa Rica, such as San Carlos, Herediano, whom he joined in December 1999, and Cartaginés. With Saprissa, he has won two national championships and a CONCACAF Champions Cup, and was part of the team that played the 2005 FIFA Club World Championship, where Saprissa finished third behind São Paulo and Liverpool. At most of his teams he has been the reserve goalkeeper.

== International career ==
On junior level, he played in 1995 FIFA U-17 World Championship held in Ecuador, and the 1997 FIFA World Youth Championship held in Malaysia.
