= Brad Parker (soccer) =

Canadian soccer player

Personal information
- Full name: Bradley Raymond Parker
- Date of birth: 23 April 1980 (age 46)
- Place of birth: Scarborough, Ontario, Canada
- Height: 1.87 m (6 ft 1 1/2 in)
- Positions: Defender; midfielder

Youth career
- 1996–1998: Feyenoord

Senior career*
| Years | Team | Apps | (Gls) |
| 1998–2001 | Feyenoord | 0 | (0) |

International career
| 1998–2000 | Canada | 8 | (0) |
- * Club domestic league appearances and goals

Bradley Raymond Parker (born 23 April 1980) is a Canadian former soccer player who played at both professional and international levels as a defender and midfielder.

== Career ==
=== Club career ===
Born in Scarborough, Ontario, Parker played club football with Dutch club Feyenoord. In June 2000, he was on trial with Belgian club RWD Molenbeek, and he finally left Feyenoord in July 2001 after five years with the club. After leaving Feyenoord, Parker went on trial with English clubs Bradford City, and Chesterfield.

=== International career ===
Parker played at the 1995 FIFA U-17 World Championship, making three appearances in the tournament.

He earned eight caps for the Canadian senior team between 1998 and 2000. In an April 1999 friendly match against Northern Ireland, Parker scored an own goal.
