= Hugo Carreira =

Portuguese footballer (born 1979)

Personal information
- Full name: Hugo Miguel Martins Carreira
- Date of birth: 10 March 1979 (age 47)
- Place of birth: Lisbon, Portugal]
- Height: 1.86 m (6 ft 1 in)
- Position: Centre back

Youth career
- 1989–1993: Sporting CP
- 1993–1997: Barreirense

Senior career*
Years	Team	Apps	(Gls)
1997–1998	Barreirense	29	(0)
1998–2001	Deportivo La Coruña B	48	(0)
2001–2002	Estrela Amadora	24	(1)
2002–2003	Nacional	17	(0)
2003–2009	Estrela Amadora	97	(2)
2009	Qingdao Jonoon	24	(1)
2010–2011	AEP	21	(3)
2012	Portimonense	4	(0)
2012–2014	Atlético	58	(1)
2014–2015	Fabril	20	(0)
Total		342	(8)

International career
1998	Portugal U18	7	(1)
1998–1999	Portugal U20	15	(0)
2000–2001	Portugal U21	7	(0)
- * Club domestic league appearances and goals

Hugo Miguel Martins Carreira (born 10 March 1979) is a Portuguese former professional footballer who played as a central defender.

== Club career ==
Born in Lisbon, Carreira started his professional career at local F.C. Barreirense. After two seasons he was acquired by La Liga club Deportivo de La Coruña, but would never play in any first-team games during three seasons.

For the 2001–02 campaign, Carreira joined C.F. Estrela da Amadora in the second division. After a brief spell with C.D. Nacional in Madeira, with which he made his Primeira Liga debut, he returned to the Lisbon-based side, being relatively used in his six-year spell.

In March 2009, Carreira left Estrela which was facing a severe economic crisis, and moved to China's Qingdao Jonoon FC. In the following year he moved teams – and countries – again, signing for AEP Paphos FC of Cyprus.
