= Goran Sankovič =

Slovenian footballer (1979–2022)

Personal information
- Date of birth: 18 June 1979
- Place of birth: Celje, SR Slovenia, SFR Yugoslavia
- Date of death: 4 June 2022 (aged 42)
- Place of death: Slovenia
- Height: 1.86 m (6 ft 1 in)
- Position: Defender

Senior career*
| Years | Team | Apps | (Gls) |
| 1996–2001 | Celje | 99 | (2) |
| 2001–2002 | Slavia Prague | 21 | (0) |
| 2002–2003 | Akratitos | 0 | (0) |
| 2003–2004 | Panionios | 1 | (0) |
| Total | | 121 | (2) |

International career
| 1994–1995 | Slovenia U16 | 4 | (0) |
| 1997 | Slovenia U18 | 4 | (0) |
| 1998 | Slovenia U20 | 3 | (0) |
| 1998–2001 | Slovenia U21 | 20 | (1) |
| 2001–2002 | Slovenia | 5 | (0) |
- * Club domestic league appearances and goals

Goran Sankovič (18 June 1979 – 4 June 2022) was a Slovenian professional footballer who played as a defender for Slovenian team Celje, Czech team Slavia Prague, and Greek teams Akratitos and Panionios.

== Career ==
Sankovič made 21 appearances for Slavia Prague in the Czech Republic. He joined Super League Greece side Panionios in July 2003.

He played five full internationals for Slovenia and was a member of the Slovenia squad at the 2002 FIFA World Cup, where he was an unused substitute.

His career was curt short by a serious knee injury in 2004.

== Death ==
Sankovič went missing on 3 June 2022 and was found dead a day later. He was 42 years old.
