= Pedro Alves (footballer, born 1979) =

Portuguese footballer

Personal information
- Full name: Pedro Miguel Morais Alves
- Date of birth: 8 February 1979 (age 47)
- Place of birth: Lisbon, Portugal
- Height: 1.88 m (6 ft 2 in)
- Position: Goalkeeper

Youth career
- 1988–1993: Belenenses
- 1993–1994: GS Carcavelos
- 1994–1997: Belenenses

Senior career*
Years	Team	Apps	(Gls)
1997–2006	Belenenses	4	(0)
1998–1999	→ Pescadores (loan)		
1999–2000	→ Beneditense (loan)	19	(0)
2006–2008	Estrela Amadora	11	(0)
2008–2009	Vitória Setúbal	7	(0)
2009–2011	Pinhalnovense	43	(0)
2011–2013	Oriental	33	(0)
2013–2014	Pinhalnovense	29	(0)
2014–2018	Cova Piedade	137	(0)
Total		283	(0)

International career
1995	Portugal U16	6	(0)
1999	Portugal U20	1	(0)
2001	Portugal U21	1	(0)
- * Club domestic league appearances and goals

Pedro Miguel Morais Alves (born 8 February 1979) is a Portuguese former professional footballer who played as a goalkeeper.

== Playing career ==
Born in Lisbon, Alves spent the better part of his 21-year senior career in the lower leagues. Over four seasons, he appeared in 22 Primeira Liga matches, four for C.F. Os Belenenses, 11 for C.F. Estrela da Amadora and seven for Vitória de Setúbal. His debut in the competition was made with the first of those sides on 12 February 2006, in a 0–2 home loss to FC Porto.

Alves signed with C.D. Cova da Piedade in June 2014, aged 35. In the 2015–16 campaign, he was part of the squad that reached the LigaPro for the first time in the club's history, as champions following a penalty shootout against F.C. Vizela.

From 2016 to 2018, Alves played a further 76 matches in the second division, with the team always managing to stay afloat. He announced his retirement on 12 May 2018, at 39.

== Coaching career ==
Immediately after retiring, Alves was hired as goalkeeper coach at Belenenses SAD. He later worked with the same manager, Silas, at Sporting CP and F.C. Famalicão.
