= Michał Osiński =

Polish footballer

Personal information
- Full name: Michał Osiński
- Date of birth: 5 September 1978 (age 48)
- Place of birth: Łódź, Poland
- Height: 1.80 m (5 ft 11 in)
- Position: Defender

Senior career*
Years	Team	Apps	(Gls)
1993–1996	ŁKS Łódź	0	(0)
1996–1997	MKP Zgierz		
1997–1998	Piotrcovia Piotrków Trybunalski		
1998–2001	ŁKS Łódź		
2002	Siarka Tarnobrzeg		
2002–2003	Unia Skierniewice		
2003	RKS Radomsko	6	(0)
2004	Pelikan Łowicz		
2004–2005	Ceramika Paradyż		
2005	KS Paradyż		
2006	Świt Nowy Dwór Mazowiecki	16	(0)
2006–2008	Ruch Chorzów	30	(1)
2008–2012	Podbeskidzie Bielsko-Biała	91	(2)
2012	ŁKS Łódź	7	(0)
2013–2020	Zawisza Rzgów		
- * Club domestic league appearances and goals

Michał Osiński (born 5 September 1978) is a Polish former professional footballer who played as a defender.

== Honours ==
Ruch Chorzów

- II liga: 2006–07
