= Czarni Żagań =

Polish football club

- Full name: Miejski Klub Sportowy Czarni Żagań 1957
- Nickname: Czarni (The Blacks)
- Founded: October 1957; 68 years ago
- Ground: Czarni Stadium
- Capacity: 1,300
- Chairman: Roman Chruścicki
- Head coach: Grzegorz Tychowski
- League: IV liga Lubusz
- 2024–25: IV liga Lubusz, 11th of 18
| Home colours | Away colours |

Czarni Żagań is a Polish association football club based in Żagań, Lower Silesia. They play in the IV liga Lubusz, the fifth level of the national football league system.

== History ==
Former club crest, without the foundation date

The club was founded in 1957 by soldiers from the Żagań Garrison. It is the most successful football team in Lubusz Voivodeship; only Czarni from this voivodeship reached the final of the Polish Cup. They lost 4–0 to Górnik Zabrze. After the 1965 final, Czarni should have played in the 1965–66 European Cup Winners' Cup, but for political and military reasons, Czarni did not join the competition.

In the years 2019–2021, there was a senior women's team.

The resulting crisis on the Polish-Belarusian border meant that at the beginning of November 2021 most players of Czarni serving in the Polish Armed Forces received official orders, which prevented them from representing Czarni in the last four games of the IV liga in 2021. The Lubusz Football Association didn't allow the matches of Czarni to be postponed due to the possibility of suspending the games in connection with the COVID-19 pandemic.

== European record ==
| Season | Competition | Round | Opponent | Result |
|---|---|---|---|---|
| 1965–66 | European Cup Winners' Cup | 1R | (England) West Ham United | defaulted |

== Season statistics ==
| Division tier | Women | | Men | |
| Division tier | Number of seasons | Seasons | Number of seasons | Seasons |
|---|---|---|---|---|
| I | 0 | – | 0 | – |
| II | 0 | – | 0 | – |
| III | 0 | – | 16 | 1960–1966, 1974–1976, 1984–1986, 1991/1992, 2000–2002, 2008–2012 |
| IV | 1 | 2019–20 | 34 | 1959, 1966–1971, 1973/1974, 1976–1984, 1986–1991, 1992–2000, 2002–2008 |
| V | 1 | 2020–21 | 8 | 1958, 1971–1973, 2019–cur. |
| VI | 0 | – | 5 | 2014–2019 |
| VII | 0 | – | 1 | 2013–14 |
| VIII | 0 | – | 1 | 2012–13 |

=== Women ===
| Season | National competitions | | | | | | | | | Remarks |
| Season | Division | | Position | Pld | W | D | L | GF | GA | Remarks |
|---|---|---|---|---|---|---|---|---|---|---|
| 2019–20 | IV | III liga | ▼4/5 | 8 | 3 | 0 | 5 | 9 | 37 | Cancellation of the season due to the COVID-19 pandemic |
| 2020–21 | V | IV liga | ▲2/4 | 12 | 5 | 1 | 6 | 35 | 29 | |
| 2021–22 | IV | III liga | D | | | | | | | The club's management liquidated the team before the season began |

=== Men ===
| Season | National competitions | | | | | | | | | Remarks | PP | European competitions | |
| Season | Division | | Position | Pld | W | D | L | GF | GA | Remarks | PP | Competition | Round |
|---|---|---|---|---|---|---|---|---|---|---|---|---|---|
| 1958 | V | Klasa B | ▲1/? | | | | | | | | No | | |
| 1959 | IV | Klasa A | ▲1/13 | | | | | | | | No | | |
| 1960 | III | III liga | 1/12 | | | | | | | Lost play-offs for promotion to II liga with Górnik Konin & Lechia Szczecinek | No | | |
| 1960–61 | III | III liga | 1/13 | | | | | | | Lost play-offs for promotion to II liga with Czarni Szczecin, Warta Poznań & Lechia Szczecinek | No | | |
| 1961–62 | III | III liga | 3/13 | | | | | | | | | | |
| 1962–63 | III | III liga | 1/13 | | | | | | | Lost play-offs for promotion to II liga with Zawisza Bydgoszcz, Arka Gdynia, Czarni Szczecin & Gwardia Koszalin | | | |
| 1963–64 | III | III liga | 1/13 | | | | | | | Lost play-offs for promotion to II liga with Arka Gdynia, Gryf Słupsk, Pomorzanin Toruń & Wiarus Szczecin | 1R | | |
| 1964–65 | III | III liga | 1/12 | | | | | | | Lost additional game for championship title of league with Stilon Gorzów Wlkp. | F | | |
| 1965–66 | III | III liga | ▼4/12 | | | | | | | Teams from 4-10 position were relegated to Klasa Okręgowa | | Cup Winners' Cup | D |
| 1966–67 | IV | Klasa okręgowa | 7/12 | | | | | | | | | | |
| 1967–68 | IV | Klasa okręgowa | 5/12 | | | | | | | | | | |
| 1968–69 | IV | Klasa okręgowa | 6/13 | | | | | | | | | | |
| 1969–70 | IV | Klasa okręgowa | 12/14 | | | | | | | | | | |
| 1970–71 | IV | Klasa okręgowa | ▼14/14 | | | | | | | | | | |
| 1984–85 | III | III liga | 8/14 | 26 | | | | 30 | 29 | | | | |
| 1985–86 | III | III liga | ▼11/14 | 26 | | | | 31 | 44 | | | | |
| 1991–92 | III | III liga | 15 | | | | | | | | | | |
| 2000–01 | III | III liga | 9 | | | | | | | | 2R | | |
| 2001–02 | III | III liga | ▼16 | | | | | 30 | 52 | | | | |
| 2002–03 | IV | IV liga | 5 | | | | | 52 | 33 | | | | |
| 2003–04 | IV | IV liga | 7 | | | | | 64 | 52 | | | | |
| 2004–05 | IV | IV liga | 10 | | | | | 48 | 39 | | | | |
| 2005–06 | IV | IV liga | 3 | | | | | 65 | 32 | | | | |
| 2006–07 | IV | IV liga | 10 | | | | | 39 | 35 | | | | |
| 2007–08 | IV | IV liga | 1/16 | 30 | 21 | 4 | 5 | 70 | 27 | won the play-off with Polonia Świdnica | | | |
| 2008–09 | III | II liga | 14/18 | 34 | 9 | 11 | 14 | 31 | 50 | won the play-off with Goplania Inowrocław | | | |
| 2009–10 | III | II liga | 9/18 | 34 | 12 | 11 | 11 | 46 | 42 | | ER | | |
| 2010–11 | III | II liga | 12/18 | 34 | 12 | 9 | 13 | 54 | 47 | | ER | | |
| 2011–12 | III | II liga | 12/18 | 34 | 12 | 8 | 14 | 34 | 53 | no license for the next season | ER | | |
| 2012–13 | VIII | Klasa B | ▲1/12 | 22 | 15 | 2 | 4 | 71 | 12 | | D | | |
| 2013–14 | VII | Klasa A | ▲2/16 | 30 | 21 | 3 | 6 | 108 | 39 | | | | |
| 2014–15 | VI | Klasa okręgowa | 6/16 | 30 | 17 | 4 | 9 | 73 | 49 | | | | |
| 2015–16 | VI | Klasa okręgowa | 5/16 | 30 | 14 | 5 | 11 | 46 | 35 | | | | |
| 2016–17 | VI | Klasa okręgowa | 6/16 | 30 | 16 | 6 | 8 | 66 | 30 | | | | |
| 2017–18 | VI | Klasa okręgowa | 4/16 | 30 | 18 | 7 | 5 | 87 | 42 | | | | |
| 2018–19 | VI | Klasa okręgowa | ▲2/16 | 30 | 26 | 2 | 2 | 88 | 21 | | | | |
| 2019–20 | V | IV liga | 14/16 | 15 | 4 | 2 | 9 | 22 | 36 | Cancellation of the season due to the COVID-19 pandemic | | | |
| 2020–21 | V | IV liga | 15/19 | 36 | 11 | 10 | 15 | 60 | 64 | | | | |
| 2021–22 | V | IV liga | 8/18 | 34 | 14 | 5 | 15 | 56 | 51 | | | | |
| 2022–23 | V | IV liga | 8/18 | 34 | 17 | 3 | 14 | 71 | 64 | | | | |
| 2023–24 | V | IV liga | 9/18 | 34 | 15 | 5 | 14 | 53 | 70 | | | | |
| 2024–25 | V | IV liga | 11/18 | 34 | 13 | 6 | 15 | 49 | 54 | | | | |

== Honours ==
- Polish Cup:
  - Finalists: 1964–65
- Polish Cup (Lubusz regionals):
  - Winners: 5x: 1962–63, 1976–77, 1978–79, 1980–81, 1999–2000
  - Finalists: 1952, 1963–64, 1979–80, 1981–82, 1990–91
