= Jairo Montaño =

Ecuadorian footballer (born 1979)

Personal information
- Full name: Jairo Montaño
- Date of birth: July 9, 1979 (age 47)
- Place of birth: Guayaquil, Ecuador
- Position: Defender

Team information
- Current team: Barcelona

Senior career*
Years	Team	Apps	(Gls)
1999–2002	Delfín	93	(0)
2003	Manta	15	(3)
2004	Delfín	37	(0)
2005	LDU Portoviejo	18	(0)
2005	Deportivo Quito	3	(0)
2006	Delfín	17	(0)
2006–	Barcelona	76	(4)

International career^{‡}
2006–	Ecuador	6	(0)
- * Club domestic league appearances and goals as of 15 December 2009 ‡ National team caps and goals as of 15 December 2009

Jairo Montaño (born July 9, 1979) is a football defender. He currently plays for Barcelona Sporting Club.
