= Concordia Piotrków Trybunalski =

Polish football club

- Full name: Klub Sportowy; Concordia Piotrków Trybunalski
- Founded: 22 May 1909; 115 years ago
- Ground: Stadion Miejski
- Capacity: 2,950
Home colours

Concordia Piotrków Trybunalski is a football club based in Piotrków Trybunalski, Poland. Concordia was established in 1909, and is the sixth oldest Polish football club in existence.

In 2015, its membership in the Łódź Football Association was revoked, and it doesn't currently compete in any competition. A phoenix club, UKS Concordia 1909, was founded in 2014. As of May 2024, it plays in the Piotrków Trybunalski group of the regional league, but it is not considered a legal successor of the original Concordia.
