= Márcio Santos (footballer, born 1979) =

Portuguese footballer

Personal information
- Full name: Márcio Alexandre Henriques Gonçalves Santos
- Date of birth: 5 May 1979 (age 47)
- Place of birth: Lisbon, Portugal
- Height: 1.80 m (5 ft 11 in)
- Position: Goalkeeper

Youth career
- 1990–1996: Sporting CP

Senior career*
Years	Team	Apps	(Gls)
1996–1999	Lourinhanense	23	(0)
1999–2001	Felgueiras	34	(0)
2001–2003	Académica	35	(0)
2003–2004	Estrela Amadora	6	(0)
2005–2006	Odivelas	15	(0)
2006–2007	Olivais Moscavide	4	(0)
2007–2008	Odivelas	32	(0)
2008–2011	Mafra	77	(0)
2011–2012	Torreense	11	(0)
2012–2013	Loures	6	(0)
Total		243	(0)

International career
2000–2002	Portugal U21	12	(0)
- * Club domestic league appearances and goals

Márcio Alexandre Henriques Gonçalves Santos (born 5 May 1979 in Lisbon) is a Portuguese former professional footballer who played as a goalkeeper.
