= Zeferino (Portuguese footballer) =

Portuguese footballer

Personal information
- Full name: Zeferino Paulo Borges Soares
- Date of birth: 27 August 1978 (age 48)
- Place of birth: Bissau, Guinea-Bissau
- Height: 1.74 m (5 ft 8 1/2 in)
- Position: Striker

Youth career
- 1992–1995: Porto

Senior career*
Years	Team	Apps	(Gls)
1995–2000	Real Madrid B	75	(22)
1997–1998	→ Las Palmas (loan)	13	(1)
1999–2000	→ Badajoz (loan)	9	(0)
2000–2004	Alverca	61	(10)
2004–2005	Umm-Salal		
2005–2006	Logroñés		
2007–2008	Umm-Salal		
2008–2009	Çetinkaya Türk		
2009	Hibernians	9	(6)

International career
1997–1998	Portugal U21	9	(5)
- * Club domestic league appearances and goals

Zeferino Paulo Borges Soares (born 27 August 1978), known simply as Zeferino, is a Portuguese retired footballer who played as a striker.

== Club career ==
Zeferino was born in Bissau, Guinea-Bissau. He started his career from F.C. Porto's youth academy, considered one of the best Portuguese talents of his generation. Aged 17, he was bought by Spanish giants Real Madrid, but never played for the first team, going on to appear three seasons for the reserve side Real Madrid Castilla while also serving two second division loans in Spain.

In January 2001 Zeferino was released and joined F.C. Alverca, going on to experience his most steady period, with three consecutive top level seasons. Prior to the 2005–06 kick-off he had a trial with Major League Soccer's D.C. United, but nothing came of it, and he went on to represent Umm-Salal Sports Club (twice), CD Logroñés, Çetinkaya Türk S.K. and Hibernians FC.

== International career ==
Zeferino was also eligible to play for the Guinea-Bissau national football team, but he chose Portugal. He played for Portugal U21 9 times scoring 5 times. He was never called up for the senior national team.
