= Andreas Voss (footballer) =

German footballer

Personal information
- Date of birth: 27 February 1979 (age 47)
- Place of birth: Stolberg (Rhineland), West Germany
- Height: 1.85 m (6 ft 1 in)
- Position: Midfielder

Youth career
- –1994: 1. FC Köln
- 1994–1998: Bayer Leverkusen

Senior career*
Years	Team	Apps	(Gls)
1998–1999	Bayer Leverkusen II	21	(5)
1998–2001	Bayer Leverkusen	0	(0)
1999–2000	→ MSV Duisburg (loan)	13	(1)
2000–2001	→ VfL Wolfsburg (loan)	9	(0)
2001–2008	MSV Duisburg	96	(11)
Total		139	(17)

International career
1998–2000	Germany U-21	14	(6)
2002	Germany Team 2006	1	(0)
- * Club domestic league appearances and goals

Andreas Voss (born 27 February 1979) is a German former professional footballer who played as midfielder. He represented Germany at the 1999 FIFA World Youth Championship.
