= 1997 FIFA World Youth Championship squads =

FIFA championship roster

Below are the squads for the 1997 FIFA World Youth Championship tournament in Malaysia. Those marked in bold went on to earn full international caps.

== Group A ==
=== Belgium ===
No.	Pos.	Player	Date of birth (age)	Caps	Club
1	GK	**Jean-François Gillet**	31 May 1979 (aged 18)		(Belgium) Standard Liège
2	DF	Bjorn de Coninck	20 July 1977 (aged 19)		(Belgium) Club Brugge
3	DF	**Carl Hoefkens**	6 October 1978 (aged 18)		(Belgium) Lierse SK
4	DF	François Rouffignon	22 January 1978 (aged 19)		(Belgium) Standard Liège
5	DF	Guy Veldeman	14 December 1978 (aged 18)		(Belgium) Anderlecht
6	DF	Dimitri Wavreille	27 January 1977 (aged 20)		(Belgium) Standard Liège
7	MF	Fabrice Staelens	11 January 1977 (aged 20)		(Belgium) Cercle Brugge
8	MF	**Tom Caluwé**	11 April 1978 (aged 19)		(Belgium) KV Mechelen
9	MF	Frank Magerman	9 November 1977 (aged 19)		(Belgium) Beveren
10	MF	Joeri Pardo	12 October 1977 (aged 19)		(Belgium) Club Brugge
11	DF	Gauthier Remacle	26 May 1977 (aged 20)		(Belgium) Standard Liège
12	GK	Olivier Renard	24 May 1979 (aged 18)		(Belgium) Charleroi
13	MF	Gunter van Handenhoven	16 December 1978 (aged 18)		(Belgium) KV Mechelen
14	FW	Wesley de Smet	5 January 1977 (aged 20)		(Belgium) Beveren
15	FW	Kurt Morhaye	29 March 1977 (aged 20)		(Belgium) Sint-Truiden
16	FW	**Cédric Roussel**	6 January 1978 (aged 19)		(Belgium) La Louvière
17	MF	Sammy van den Bossche	5 May 1977 (aged 20)		(Belgium) Eendracht Aalst
18	FW	Bart van den Eede	3 January 1977 (aged 20)		(Belgium) Beveren

=== Malaysia ===
No.	Pos.	Player	Date of birth (age)	Caps	Club
1	GK	**Megat Amir Faisal**	27 September 1978 (aged 18)		(Malaysia) Penang FA
2	MF	**Nik Ahmad Fadly**	28 May 1977 (aged 20)		(Malaysia) Kelantan FA
3	DF	Mohanadasan Karunakaran	20 July 1978 (aged 18)		(Malaysia) Kuala Lumpur FA
4	DF	Supramaniam Jayaprakash	24 February 1979 (aged 18)		(Malaysia) Public Bank FC
5	MF	Mujappan Gopalan	29 August 1977 (aged 19)		(Malaysia) Kuala Lumpur FA
6	DF	Mohd Affendy Hamzah	10 January 1977 (aged 20)		(Malaysia) Kuala Lumpur FA
7	MF	Roslee Md Derus	15 August 1978 (aged 18)		(Malaysia) Terengganu FA
8	MF	Azlan Hussain	8 August 1977 (aged 19)		(Malaysia) Kuala Lumpur FA
9	FW	**Vellu Saravanan**	11 January 1978 (aged 19)		(Malaysia) Perak FA
10	MF	**Dass Gregory Kolopis**	1 February 1977 (aged 20)		(Malaysia) Sabah FA
11	MF	Mohd Azmir Norhakim Burhan	11 December 1978 (aged 18)		(Malaysia) Kuala Lumpur FA
12	MF	**Gilbert Cassidy Gawing**	3 March 1977 (aged 20)		(Malaysia) Sarawak FA
13	DF	**Khairun Haled Masrom**	4 June 1977 (aged 20)		(Malaysia) Negeri Sembilan FA
14	DF	Murugayah Elangoo	22 March 1977 (aged 20)		(Malaysia) Selangor FA
15	MF	**Tengku Hazman**	6 March 1977 (aged 20)		(Malaysia) Perlis FA
16	FW	Chow Chee Weng	21 May 1977 (aged 20)		(Malaysia) Penang FA
17	MF	Mohd Nafuzi Zain	27 October 1978 (aged 18)		(Malaysia) Kelantan FA
18	GK	Mohd Sany Muhammad Fahmi	13 August 1978 (aged 18)		(Malaysia) Johor FA
19	MF	Saiful Anuar Ismail	13 August 1978 (aged 18)		(Malaysia) Perlis FA

=== Morocco ===
No.	Pos.	Player	Date of birth (age)	Caps	Club
1	GK	**Tarik El Jarmouni**	30 December 1977 (aged 19)		(Morocco) SCCM de Mohammédia
2	DF	Rachid Bourissai	4 January 1977 (aged 20)		(Morocco) Maghreb Fez
3	DF	Mounir Haddaji	5 June 1977 (aged 20)		(Morocco) Kawkab Marrakech
4	DF	Khalid Khamma	28 April 1978 (aged 19)		(Morocco) Wydad Casablanca
5	MF	**Youssef Safri**	13 January 1977 (aged 20)		(Morocco) Rachad Bernoussi
6	MF	Aissam Barroudi	10 May 1978 (aged 19)		(Morocco) MAS Fes
7	DF	Mohamed Kharbouch	22 January 1977 (aged 20)		(Morocco) Raja Casablanca
8	FW	**Adil Ramzi**	14 July 1977 (aged 19)		(Morocco) Kawkab Marrakech
9	FW	**Hicham Zerouali**	17 July 1977 (aged 19)		(Morocco) FUS Rabat
10	MF	**Tarik Sektioui**	13 May 1977 (aged 20)		(Morocco) Maghreb Fez
11	FW	**Mohamed Jabrane**	29 November 1979 (aged 17)		(Morocco) Maghreb Fez
12	GK	Hichame Oussaid	5 February 1978 (aged 19)		(Morocco) RS Settat
13	FW	Ihsane Ghandi	1 January 1977 (aged 20)		(Morocco) Wydad Casablanca
14	DF	Abdelaziz Larabi	1 January 1977 (aged 20)		(Morocco) FAR Rabat
15	DF	Mohammed Chippo	20 April 1977 (aged 20)		(Morocco) KAC Kenitra
16	DF	**Noureddine Kacemi**	17 October 1977 (aged 19)		(Morocco) SCCM de Mohammédia
17	MF	Hamid Termina	5 January 1977 (aged 20)		(Morocco) Wydad Casablanca
18	MF	Abdelfetah Saad	5 July 1977 (aged 19)		(Morocco) Wydad Casablanca

=== Uruguay ===
No.	Pos.	Player	Date of birth (age)	Caps	Club
1	GK	**Gustavo Munúa**	27 January 1978 (aged 19)		(Uruguay) Nacional
2	DF	Álvaro Perea	6 April 1978 (aged 19)		(Uruguay) Peñarol
3	DF	**Martín Rivas**	17 February 1977 (aged 20)		(Uruguay) Danubio
4	DF	**Carlos Díaz**	4 February 1979 (aged 18)		(Uruguay) Defensor Sporting Club
5	MF	**Pablo García**	11 May 1977 (aged 20)		(Uruguay) Montevideo Wanderers
6	DF	**César Pellegrín**	5 March 1979 (aged 18)		(Uruguay) Danubio
7	MF	**Christian Callejas**	17 May 1978 (aged 19)		(Uruguay) Danubio
8	MF	**Fabián Coelho**	20 January 1977 (aged 20)		(Uruguay) Nacional
9	FW	**Marcelo Zalayeta**	5 December 1978 (aged 18)		(Uruguay) Peñarol
10	FW	**Nicolás Olivera**	30 May 1978 (aged 19)		(Uruguay) Defensor Sporting Club
11	MF	**Inti Podestá**	23 April 1978 (aged 19)		(Uruguay) Danubio
12	GK	**Fabián Carini**	26 December 1979 (aged 17)		(Uruguay) Danubio
13	DF	Alejandro Meloño	27 April 1977 (aged 20)		(Uruguay) Rentistas
14	DF	**Alejandro Lembo**	15 February 1978 (aged 19)		(Uruguay) Bella Vista
15	MF	**Mario Regueiro**	14 September 1978 (aged 18)		(Uruguay) Cerro
16	FW	Manuel Abreu	8 March 1977 (aged 20)		(Uruguay) Defensor Sporting Club
17	FW	**Rodrigo López**	21 January 1978 (aged 19)		(Uruguay) River Plate
18	MF	Sebastián Cartagena	19 January 1978 (aged 19)		(Uruguay) Danubio

== Group B ==
=== Brazil ===
No.	Pos.	Player	Date of birth (age)	Caps	Club
1	GK	Marcelo	8 January 1977 (aged 20)		(Brazil) Flamengo
2	DF	**Paulo César**	28 June 1978 (aged 18)		(Brazil) Flamengo
3	DF	Jean	24 September 1977 (aged 19)		(Brazil) Santos
4	DF	Álvaro	1 November 1977 (aged 19)		(Brazil) São Paulo
5	MF	Sidney	3 March 1977 (aged 20)		(Brazil) São Paulo
6	DF	**Athirson**	16 January 1977 (aged 20)		(Brazil) Flamengo
7	FW	Fabiano	6 April 1978 (aged 19)		(Brazil) São Paulo
8	MF	**Pedrinho**	29 June 1977 (aged 19)		(Brazil) Vasco da Gama
9	FW	**Fernandão**	18 March 1978 (aged 19)		(Brazil) Goiás
10	MF	**Alex**	14 September 1977 (aged 19)		(Brazil) Coritiba
11	FW	**Adaílton**	24 January 1977 (aged 20)		(Brazil) Guarani
12	GK	**Helton**	18 May 1978 (aged 19)		(Brazil) Vasco da Gama
13	DF	Éder	7 October 1977 (aged 19)		(Brazil) Grêmio
14	DF	Vinícius	7 March 1977 (aged 20)		(Brazil) Internacional
15	MF	Odair	22 January 1977 (aged 20)		(Brazil) Internacional
16	MF	Perdigão	28 June 1977 (aged 19)		(Brazil) Coritiba
17	FW	Júnior	2 April 1977 (aged 20)		(Brazil) Bahia
18	FW	**Rôni**	28 April 1977 (aged 20)		(Brazil) Fluminense

=== France ===
No.	Pos.	Player	Date of birth (age)	Caps	Club
1	GK	**Mickaël Landreau**	14 May 1979 (aged 18)		(France) Nantes
2	DF	**Willy Sagnol**	18 March 1977 (aged 20)		(France) Saint-Étienne
3	DF	Jean-Sébastien Jaurès	30 September 1977 (aged 19)		(France) Auxerre
4	DF	**Mikaël Silvestre**	9 August 1977 (aged 19)		(France) Rennes
5	DF	**William Gallas**	17 August 1977 (aged 19)		(France) Caen
6	MF	Peter Luccin	9 April 1979 (aged 18)		(France) Bordeaux
7	MF	Yoann Bigné	23 August 1977 (aged 19)		(France) Rennes
8	MF	**Kuami Agboh** (Note: Capped for Togo)	28 December 1977 (aged 19)		(France) Auxerre
9	FW	**Thierry Henry**	17 August 1977 (aged 19)		(France) Monaco
10	FW	**Daniel Moreira**	8 August 1977 (aged 19)		(France) Guingamp
11	FW	**David Trezeguet**	15 October 1977 (aged 19)		(France) Monaco
12	MF	Kodjo Afanou	21 January 1977 (aged 20)		(France) Bordeaux
13	DF	**Philippe Christanval**	31 August 1978 (aged 18)		(France) Monaco
14	FW	**Nicolas Anelka**	14 March 1979 (aged 18)		(England) Arsenal
15	MF	Mehdi Leroy	18 April 1978 (aged 19)		(France) Nantes
16	GK	Jérémie Janot	11 October 1977 (aged 19)		(France) Saint-Étienne
17	FW	Cédric Mouret	26 March 1978 (aged 19)		(France) Cannes
18	FW	Lilian Compan	30 April 1977 (aged 20)		(France) Cannes

=== South Korea ===
No.	Pos.	Player	Date of birth (age)	Caps	Club
1	GK	Chung Yoo-suk	25 October 1977 (aged 19)		(South Korea) Ajou University
2	DF	Cho Se-kwon	26 June 1978 (aged 18)		(South Korea) Chung-Ang University
3	DF	Han Jong-sung	30 January 1977 (aged 20)		(South Korea) Sungkyunkwan University
4	DF	Park Joon-hong	13 April 1978 (aged 19)		(South Korea) Yonsei University
5	DF	Sim Jae-won	11 March 1977 (aged 20)		(South Korea) Yonsei University
6	MF	Kim Man-joong	4 November 1978 (aged 18)		(South Korea) Myongji University
7	DF	**Park Jin-sub**	11 March 1977 (aged 20)		(South Korea) Korea University
8	MF	Lee Kwan-woo	25 February 1978 (aged 19)		(South Korea) Hanyang University
9	FW	An Hyo-yeon	16 April 1978 (aged 19)		(South Korea) Dankook University
10	MF	Kim Do-kyun	13 January 1977 (aged 20)		(South Korea) University of Ulsan
11	FW	Park Byeong-ju	5 October 1977 (aged 19)		(South Korea) Hansung University
12	DF	Lee Jung-min	29 September 1978 (aged 18)		(South Korea) Korea University
13	DF	Moon Byun-mo	30 April 1977 (aged 20)		(South Korea) Kyonggi University
14	DF	Nam Ki-sung	10 October 1977 (aged 19)		(South Korea) Hanyang University
15	MF	Seo Ki-bok	28 January 1979 (aged 18)		(South Korea) Yonsei University
16	MF	Yang Hyun-jung	25 July 1977 (aged 19)		(South Korea) Dankook University
17	FW	Chung Seok-keun	25 November 1977 (aged 19)		(South Korea) Ajou University
18	GK	Choi Hyun	7 November 1978 (aged 18)		(South Korea) Chung-Ang University

=== South Africa ===
No.	Pos.	Player	Date of birth (age)	Caps	Club
1	GK	Gerald Wagner	28 January 1977 (aged 20)		(South Africa) QwaQwa Stars
2	DF	Japie Morale	1 January 1979 (aged 18)		(South Africa) Supersport United
3	DF	Vorgen Less	5 August 1977 (aged 19)		(South Africa) Hellenic FC
4	DF	**David Kannemeyer**	8 July 1977 (aged 19)		(South Africa) Cape Town Spurs
5	DF	**Matthew Booth**	14 March 1977 (aged 20)		(South Africa) Cape Town Spurs
6	FW	Lucky Maselesele	8 March 1980 (aged 17)		(South Africa) Esseler Park
7	MF	**Stanton Fredericks**	13 June 1977 (aged 20)		(South Africa) Wits University
8	MF	Mzunani Mgwigwi	17 November 1978 (aged 18)		(South Africa) Umtata Bocks
9	DF	Ashley Makhanya	6 October 1977 (aged 19)		(South Africa) Natal
10	MF	**Junaid Hartley**	22 June 1978 (aged 18)		(South Africa) Wits University
11	FW	Daniel Matsau	18 January 1977 (aged 20)		(South Africa) Lorraine Lions
12	MF	Manqoba Mkhize	23 January 1978 (aged 19)		(South Africa) Kaizer Chiefs
13	DF	Given Nyedimane	13 March 1978 (aged 19)		(South Africa) Bloemfontein Celtic
14	MF	**Steve Lekoelea**	5 February 1979 (aged 18)		(South Africa) Orlando Pirates
15	DF	Nkhiphitheni Matombo	31 January 1977 (aged 20)		(South Africa) Dynamos
16	GK	Wayne Roberts	14 August 1977 (aged 19)		(South Africa) Cape Town Spurs
17	FW	**Benni McCarthy**	12 November 1977 (aged 19)		(South Africa) Cape Town Spurs
18	MF	Patrick Mbuthu	3 February 1977 (aged 20)		(South Africa) Kaizer Chiefs

== Group C ==
=== China ===
No.	Pos.	Player	Date of birth (age)	Caps	Club
1	GK	**Li Leilei**	30 June 1977 (aged 19)		(China) Army Club
2	DF	**Li Weifeng**	26 January 1978 (aged 19)		(China) Jianlibao
3	DF	**Hao Wei**	27 December 1976 (aged 20)		(China) Jianlibao
4	DF	Zheng Yi	8 October 1977 (aged 19)		(China) Jianlibao
5	MF	**Li Tie**	18 September 1977 (aged 19)		(China) Jianlibao
6	MF	**Tao Wei**	11 March 1978 (aged 19)		(China) Jianlibao
7	MF	**Huang Yong**	26 August 1978 (aged 18)		(China) Jianlibao
8	FW	Liu Lin	19 September 1977 (aged 19)		(China) Jianlibao
9	FW	**Li Jinyu**	6 November 1977 (aged 19)		(China) Jianlibao
10	MF	**Sui Dongliang**	24 September 1977 (aged 19)		(China) Jianlibao
11	MF	**Zhang Xiaorui**	5 August 1978 (aged 18)		(China) Jianlibao
12	DF	**Yang Pu**	30 March 1978 (aged 19)		(China) Guoan
13	FW	**Wang Peng**	16 June 1978 (aged 19)		(China) Jianlibao
14	FW	Yao Li	9 August 1977 (aged 19)		(China) Jianlibao
15	DF	Zhang Ran	15 August 1977 (aged 19)		(China) Jianlibao
16	FW	**Zheng Bin**	4 July 1977 (aged 19)		(China) Jianlibao
17	FW	Sun Zhi	19 October 1977 (aged 19)		(China) Jianlibao
18	GK	**Li Jian**	9 December 1977 (aged 19)		(China) Jianlibao

=== Ghana ===
No.	Pos.	Player	Date of birth (age)	Caps	Club
1	GK	Osei Oscar Asamoah	12 December 1979 (aged 17)		(Ghana) Real Tamale United
2	MF	Joseph Ansah	5 November 1978 (aged 18)		(Ghana) Accra Hearts of Oak
3	DF	Fuseini Adams	21 November 1978 (aged 18)		(Ghana) Sekondi Hasaacas
4	DF	**Koffi Amponsah**	23 April 1978 (aged 19)		(Ghana) Ghapoha Readers
5	DF	**Christian Gyan**	2 November 1978 (aged 18)		(Netherlands) Feyenoord
6	MF	**Baba Sule**	7 November 1978 (aged 18)		(Spain) Mallorca
7	MF	Dini Kamara	13 August 1978 (aged 18)		(Uruguay) Nacional
8	MF	**Stephen Appiah**	24 December 1980 (aged 16)		(Ghana) Accra Hearts of Oak
9	FW	**Peter Ofori-Quaye**	21 March 1980 (aged 17)		(Greece) Kalamata
10	FW	Bashiru Gambo	24 September 1978 (aged 18)		(Germany) Borussia Dortmund
11	FW	Mohamed Mouktar	6 March 1977 (aged 20)		(Germany) Hamburger SV
12	MF	Abdulai Al Hassan	3 March 1978 (aged 19)		(Ghana) Real Tamale United
13	DF	Abdul Karim Ahmed	5 February 1980 (aged 17)		(Ghana) Real Sportive
14	MF	Joe Sam	18 November 1977 (aged 19)		(Ghana) Cape Coast Ebusua Dwarfs
15	DF	Odartey Lawson	1 December 1977 (aged 19)		(Ghana) Great Olympics
16	GK	Michael Abu	26 December 1978 (aged 18)		(Ghana) Okwahu United
17	MF	**Awudu Issaka**	26 June 1979 (aged 17)		(France) Auxerre
18	MF	Richard Ackon	10 October 1978 (aged 18)		(Ghana) Cape Coast Ebusua Dwarfs

=== Republic of Ireland ===
No.	Pos.	Player	Date of birth (age)	Caps	Club
1	GK	Derek O'Connor	9 March 1978 (aged 19)		(England) Huddersfield Town
2	DF	David Worrell	12 January 1978 (aged 19)		(England) Blackburn Rovers
3	DF	Robbie Ryan	6 May 1977 (aged 20)		(England) Huddersfield Town
4	DF	Colin Hawkins	17 August 1977 (aged 19)		(England) Coventry City
5	DF	Aidan Lynch	29 August 1977 (aged 19)		(Republic of Ireland) University College Dublin
6	MF	Stephen Murphy	5 April 1978 (aged 19)		(England) Huddersfield Town
7	MF	Niall Inman	6 February 1978 (aged 19)		(England) Peterborough United
8	MF	John Burns	4 December 1977 (aged 19)		(England) Nottingham Forest
9	MF	Micky Cummins	1 June 1978 (aged 19)		(England) Middlesbrough
10	MF	Thomas Morgan	30 March 1977 (aged 20)		(England) Blackburn Rovers
11	MF	**Damien Duff**	2 March 1979 (aged 18)		(England) Blackburn Rovers
12	DF	David Whittle	2 December 1978 (aged 18)		(England) Crystal Palace
13	MF	Alan Kirby	8 September 1977 (aged 19)		(England) Aston Villa
14	FW	Neale Fenn	18 January 1977 (aged 20)		(England) Tottenham Hotspur
15	FW	**Glen Crowe**	25 December 1977 (aged 19)		(England) Wolverhampton Wanderers
16	GK	Paul Whelan	4 September 1978 (aged 18)		(England) Oxford United
17	FW	Dessie Baker	25 August 1977 (aged 19)		(Republic of Ireland) Shelbourne
18	FW	Trevor Molloy	14 April 1977 (aged 20)		(Republic of Ireland) Athlone Town

=== United States ===
No.	Pos.	Player	Date of birth (age)	Caps	Club
1	GK	Andy Kirk	3 October 1977 (aged 19)		(United States) University of Maryland
2	MF	**Chad McCarty**	5 October 1977 (aged 19)		(United States) University of Washington
3	DF	Brian Dunseth	2 March 1977 (aged 20)		(United States) New England Revolution
4	DF	Matt Chulis	29 August 1977 (aged 19)		(United States) University of Virginia
5	FW	Tom Poltl	21 September 1977 (aged 19)		(United States) UCLA
6	DF	Carlos Parra	3 February 1977 (aged 20)		(United States) NY/NJ MetroStars
7	FW	Myles Stoddard	7 January 1977 (aged 20)		(United States) Reno Rattlers
8	MF	**John O'Brien**	29 August 1977 (aged 19)		(Netherlands) Ajax
9	MF	**Sasha Victorine**	3 February 1978 (aged 19)		(United States) UCLA
10	MF	**Jorge Flores**	13 February 1977 (aged 20)		(United States) Dallas Burn
11	MF	**Ben Olsen**	3 May 1977 (aged 20)		(United States) University of Virginia
12	MF	**Ramiro Corrales**	12 March 1977 (aged 20)		(United States) San Jose Clash
13	MF	Esmundo Rodriguez	25 May 1977 (aged 20)		(United States) San Jose Clash
14	MF	Joey DiGiamarino	6 April 1977 (aged 20)		(United States) Colorado Rapids
15	MF	**Brian West**	10 June 1978 (aged 19)		(United States) University of Virginia
16	FW	**Josh Wolff**	25 February 1977 (aged 20)		(United States) University of South Carolina
17	FW	Shawn Petroski	24 August 1977 (aged 19)		(Germany) Bayer Uerdingen
18	GK	Matt Napoleon	18 August 1977 (aged 19)		(United States) Columbia University

== Group D ==
=== Costa Rica ===
No.	Pos.	Player	Date of birth (age)	Caps	Club
1	GK	Fausto González	13 September 1978 (aged 18)		(Costa Rica) Cartaginés
2	DF	Douglas Barquero	11 November 1978 (aged 18)		(Costa Rica) Paraiso FC
3	DF	**Daniel Torres**	14 October 1977 (aged 19)		(Costa Rica) Deportivo Saprissa
4	MF	Pablo Nassar	28 January 1977 (aged 20)		Universidad de Costa Rica
5	MF	Leonardo Duran	26 June 1977 (aged 19)		(Costa Rica) Belen FC
6	FW	Eddie Salas	25 March 1977 (aged 20)		(Costa Rica) San Carlos
7	FW	Nelson Fonseca	10 August 1978 (aged 18)		(Costa Rica) Deportivo Saprissa
8	DF	**Douglas Sequeira**	23 August 1977 (aged 19)		(Costa Rica) Deportivo Saprissa
9	FW	**Alonso Solís**	14 October 1978 (aged 18)		(Costa Rica) Deportivo Saprissa
10	FW	**Froylán Ledezma**	2 January 1978 (aged 19)		(Costa Rica) Alajuelense
11	FW	Marvin Chinchilla	11 February 1977 (aged 20)		(Costa Rica) Pérez Zeledón
12	MF	Alvin Villavicencio	13 November 1979 (aged 17)		(Costa Rica) Guanacaste
13	MF	**Carlos Castro**	10 September 1978 (aged 18)		(Costa Rica) Alajuelense
14	MF	Andrey Campos	7 December 1978 (aged 18)		(Costa Rica) San Carlos
15	DF	**Pablo Chinchilla**	21 December 1978 (aged 18)		(Costa Rica) Alajuelense
16	FW	**Steven Bryce**	16 August 1977 (aged 19)		(Costa Rica) Goicochea
17	FW	**Jonathan Bolaños**	22 April 1978 (aged 19)		(Costa Rica) Sagrada Familia
18	GK	Rodolfo Alvarez	20 November 1978 (aged 18)		(Costa Rica) Deportivo Saprissa

=== Japan ===
No.	Pos.	Player	Date of birth (age)	Caps	Club
1	GK	Kiyomitsu Kobari	12 June 1977 (aged 20)		(Japan) Verdy Kawasaki
2	MF	Kei Mikuriya	29 August 1977 (aged 19)		(Japan) Yokohama Marinos
3	DF	Masaharu Nishi	29 May 1977 (aged 20)		(Japan) Avispa Fukuoka
4	MF	**Kazuyuki Toda**	30 December 1977 (aged 19)		(Japan) Shimizu S-Pulse
5	DF	**Tsuneyasu Miyamoto**	7 February 1977 (aged 20)		(Japan) Gamba Osaka
6	MF	Shinji Jojo	28 August 1977 (aged 19)		(Japan) Urawa Red Diamonds
7	MF	**Tomokazu Myojin**	24 January 1978 (aged 19)		(Japan) Kashiwa Reysol
8	MF	**Nozomi Hiroyama**	6 May 1977 (aged 20)		(Japan) JEF United Ichihara
9	FW	Kenji Fukuda	21 October 1977 (aged 19)		(Japan) Nagoya Grampus Eight
10	FW	**Atsushi Yanagisawa**	27 May 1977 (aged 20)		(Japan) Kashima Antlers
11	FW	**Yoshiteru Yamashita**	21 November 1977 (aged 19)		(Japan) Avispa Fukuoka
12	DF	**Satoshi Yamaguchi**	17 April 1978 (aged 19)		(Japan) JEF United Ichihara
13	MF	Harutaka Ono	12 May 1978 (aged 19)		(Japan) Kashiwa Reysol
14	DF	Masahiro Koga	8 September 1978 (aged 18)		(Japan) Nagoya Grampus Eight
15	FW	**Yuichiro Nagai**	14 February 1979 (aged 18)		(Japan) Urawa Red Diamonds
16	MF	**Shunsuke Nakamura**	24 June 1978 (aged 18)		(Japan) Yokohama Marinos
17	MF	Michiyasu Osada	5 March 1978 (aged 19)		(Japan) Verdy Kawasaki
18	GK	Yuta Minami	30 September 1979 (aged 17)		(Japan) Shizuoka Gakuen High School

=== Paraguay ===
No.	Pos.	Player	Date of birth (age)	Caps	Club
1	GK	**Justo Villar**	30 June 1977 (aged 19)		(Paraguay) Sol de América
2	DF	Diosnel Burgos	8 May 1977 (aged 20)		(Paraguay) Club Libertad
3	DF	Gustavo Cañete	4 April 1977 (aged 20)		(Paraguay) Cerro Porteño
4	DF	**Paulo da Silva**	1 February 1980 (aged 17)		(Paraguay) Atlántida
5	DF	Hernán Florentin	1 July 1977 (aged 19)		(Argentina) Boca Juniors
6	MF	Marcos Tiozzo	23 March 1977 (aged 20)		(Paraguay) Guaraní
7	FW	Raúl Román	25 October 1977 (aged 19)		(Paraguay) Nacional
8	MF	Cristian Esquivel	21 September 1977 (aged 19)		(Paraguay) Club Sol de América
9	FW	**César Ramírez**	21 March 1977 (aged 20)		(Portugal) Sporting CP
10	MF	Miguel Domínguez	30 September 1979 (aged 17)		(Paraguay) Tembetary
11	MF	César Cáceres Cañete	10 June 1977 (aged 20)		(Paraguay) Sporting Luqueño
12	GK	José Fernández	23 January 1979 (aged 18)		(Paraguay) Nacional
13	DF	Mariano Villamayor	19 August 1978 (aged 18)		(Paraguay) Guaraní
14	DF	Gustavo Florentin	30 June 1978 (aged 18)		(Paraguay) Cerro Porteño
15	MF	**Gustavo Morínigo**	23 January 1977 (aged 20)		(Paraguay) Club Libertad
16	FW	Tomás González	21 December 1977 (aged 19)		(Paraguay) Club Cerro Corá
17	FW	Juan Samudio	14 October 1978 (aged 18)		(Paraguay) Club Libertad
18	MF	Alberto Melgarejo	22 May 1978 (aged 19)		(Spain) Atlético Madrid

=== Spain ===
No.	Pos.	Player	Date of birth (age)	Caps	Club
1	GK	César Láinez	10 April 1977 (aged 20)		(Spain) Real Zaragoza
2	DF	Juan Redondo	17 January 1977 (aged 20)		(Spain) Real Betis
3	DF	**Marc Bernaus** (Note: Capped for Andorra)	2 February 1977 (aged 20)		(Spain) Barcelona B
4	DF	Curro Montoya (c)	13 February 1977 (aged 20)		(Spain) Valencia
5	DF	César Caneda	10 May 1978 (aged 19)		(Spain) Athletic Bilbao
6	MF	Ismael Ruiz	7 February 1977 (aged 20)		(Spain) Racing Santander
7	MF	Alberto Rivera	16 February 1978 (aged 19)		(Spain) Real Madrid
8	MF	**Javier Farinós**	29 March 1978 (aged 19)		(Spain) Valencia
9	FW	Diego Ribera	19 February 1977 (aged 20)		(Spain) Figueres
10	MF	Iván Ania	24 October 1977 (aged 19)		(Spain) Real Oviedo
11	FW	**Miguel Ángel Angulo**	23 June 1977 (aged 19)		(Spain) Villarreal
12	MF	Raúl Gil	3 September 1977 (aged 19)		(Spain) Athletic Bilbao
13	GK	Felip Ortiz	27 April 1977 (aged 20)		(Spain) Barcelona
14	MF	**Gerard**	12 March 1979 (aged 18)		(Spain) Barcelona
15	DF	Jesús María Lacruz	25 April 1978 (aged 19)		(Spain) Osasuna
16	DF	Jerónimo Miñarro	19 September 1977 (aged 19)		(Spain) Valencia
17	FW	José Luis Deus	12 January 1977 (aged 20)		(Spain) Deportivo de La Coruña
18	MF	**David Albelda**	1 September 1977 (aged 19)		(Spain) Villarreal

== Group E ==
=== Argentina ===
No.	Pos.	Player	Date of birth (age)	Caps	Club
1	GK	**Leo Franco**	20 May 1977 (aged 20)		(Argentina) Independiente
2	DF	**Leandro Cufré**	9 May 1978 (aged 19)		(Argentina) Gimnasia La Plata
3	DF	**Walter Samuel**	23 March 1978 (aged 19)		(Argentina) Newell's Old Boys
4	MF	Juan José Serrizuela	25 January 1977 (aged 20)		(Argentina) Lanús
5	MF	**Esteban Cambiasso**	18 August 1980 (aged 16)		(Argentina) Argentinos Juniors
6	DF	Diego Markic	9 January 1977 (aged 20)		(Argentina) Argentinos Juniors
7	FW	Diego Quintana	24 April 1978 (aged 19)		(Argentina) Newell's Old Boys
8	MF	**Juan Román Riquelme**	24 June 1978 (aged 18)		(Argentina) Boca Juniors
9	FW	**Bernardo Romeo**	10 September 1977 (aged 19)		(Argentina) Estudiantes La Plata
10	MF	**Pablo Aimar**	3 November 1979 (aged 17)		(Argentina) River Plate
11	MF	Pablo Rodríguez	7 March 1977 (aged 20)		(Argentina) Argentinos Juniors
12	GK	Cristián Muñoz	1 July 1977 (aged 19)		(Argentina) Sarmiento de Junín
13	DF	Fabián Cubero	21 December 1978 (aged 18)		(Argentina) Vélez Sársfield
14	DF	**Diego Placente**	24 April 1977 (aged 20)		(Argentina) Argentinos Juniors
15	FW	Martín Perezlindo	3 January 1977 (aged 20)		(Argentina) Unión de Santa Fe
16	MF	Nicolás Diez	9 February 1977 (aged 20)		(Argentina) Racing Club
17	MF	**Sebastián Ariel Romero**	27 April 1978 (aged 19)		(Argentina) Gimnasia La Plata
18	DF	**Lionel Scaloni**	16 May 1978 (aged 19)		(Argentina) Estudiantes La Plata

=== Australia ===
No.	Pos.	Player	Date of birth (age)	Caps	Club
1	GK	Danny Milošević	26 June 1978 (aged 18)		(Germany) Arminia Bielefeld
2	DF	**Brett Emerton**	22 February 1979 (aged 18)		(Australia) Sydney Olympic FC
3	DF	Ivan Zelic	24 February 1978 (aged 19)		(Australia) Sydney Olympic
4	DF	**Con Blatsis**	6 July 1977 (aged 19)		(Australia) South Melbourne
5	MF	**Raphael Bove**	5 March 1977 (aged 20)		(Australia) Sydney Olympic
6	DF	**Hayden Foxe**	23 June 1977 (aged 19)		(Germany) Arminia Bielefeld
7	MF	Bill Damianos	18 April 1977 (aged 20)		(Australia) South Melbourne FC
8	DF	**Lucas Neill**	9 March 1978 (aged 19)		(England) Millwall F.C.
9	MF	**Vince Grella**	5 October 1979 (aged 17)		(Australia) Victorian Institute of Sport
10	MF	Carlos Gonzalez	23 November 1977 (aged 19)		(Australia) Sydney Olympic FC
11	FW	**Michael Curcija**	27 June 1977 (aged 19)		(Australia) South Melbourne
12	MF	Kostas Salapasidis	1 July 1978 (aged 18)		(Australia) Adelaide City
13	DF	Tansel Başer	17 April 1978 (aged 19)		(Australia) South Melbourne
14	MF	Sebastian Šinožić	14 September 1978 (aged 18)		(Australia) Wollongong Wolves
15	MF	**Mark Robertson**	6 April 1977 (aged 20)		(Australia) Marconi Stallions
16	MF	Yane Talcevski	19 August 1978 (aged 18)		(Australia) Marconi Stallions
17	FW	**Danny Allsopp**	10 August 1978 (aged 18)		(Australia) South Melbourne
18	GK	Peter Zoïs	21 April 1978 (aged 19)		(Australia) South Melbourne

=== Canada ===
No.	Pos.	Player	Date of birth (age)	Caps	Club
1	GK	Taki Vohalis	15 August 1977 (aged 19)		(Canada) Coquitlam Metro
2	MF	**Jeff Clarke**	18 October 1977 (aged 19)		(Canada) Vancouver 86ers
3	DF	**Richard Hastings**	18 May 1977 (aged 20)	4 (0)	(Scotland) Caledonian Thistle
4	DF	Bryan Devenney	12 December 1977 (aged 19)		(United States) Boston College
5	DF	Steve McCauley	8 January 1977 (aged 20)		(Canada) University of British Columbia
6	MF	**Jason Bent**	8 March 1977 (aged 20)		(United States) University of Tulsa
7	DF	**Paul Stalteri**	18 October 1977 (aged 19)	5 (0)	(Canada) Toronto Lynx
8	MF	**Robbie Aristodemo**	20 May 1977 (aged 20)		(United States) University of Maryland
9	MF	Chris Stathopoulos	29 December 1977 (aged 19)		(Canada) Montreal Impact
10	DF	**Steve Kindel**	25 July 1977 (aged 19)		(Canada) Vancouver 86ers
11	DF	Jeff Skinner	2 May 1977 (aged 20)		(Canada) Vancouver 86ers
12	DF	**Marco Reda**	22 June 1977 (aged 19)		(Canada) Ontario
13	MF	Jason Mathot	1 August 1978 (aged 18)		(Canada) Vancouver 86ers
14	MF	Eric Munoz	29 August 1977 (aged 19)		(United States) University of Memphis
15	FW	Neal Yeung	5 December 1977 (aged 19)		(Canada) Simon Fraser University
16	MF	Jason Jordan	30 May 1978 (aged 19)		(Canada) Vancouver 86ers
17	MF	**Dwayne De Rosario**	15 May 1978 (aged 19)		(Canada) Toronto Lynx
18	GK	Michael Franks	20 April 1977 (aged 20)		(Canada) University of British Columbia

=== Hungary ===
No.	Pos.	Player	Date of birth (age)	Caps	Club
1	GK	**Balázs Rabóczki**	9 January 1978 (aged 19)		(Hungary) MTK Hungária
2	DF	László Erdei	27 January 1978 (aged 19)		(Hungary) BVSC Budapest
3	DF	Csaba Diczkó	28 September 1977 (aged 19)		(Hungary) Videoton Fehérvár
4	DF	**Ádám Komlósi**	6 December 1977 (aged 19)		(Hungary) BVSC Budapest
5	MF	János Szabó	6 February 1978 (aged 19)		(Hungary) VAC
6	DF	János Zováth	25 February 1977 (aged 20)		(Hungary) BVSC Budapest
7	DF	**Zoltán Balog**	22 February 1978 (aged 19)		(Hungary) Békéscsabai Elõre
8	FW	**Péter Kabát**	25 September 1977 (aged 19)		(Hungary) Budapest Honvéd
9	FW	**István Ferenczi**	14 September 1977 (aged 19)		(Hungary) MFC Sopron
10	MF	Attila Szili	11 March 1978 (aged 19)		(Germany) 1860 Munich
11	MF	**Ákos Füzi**	24 March 1978 (aged 19)		(Hungary) BVSC Budapest
12	GK	Zoltán Varga	19 August 1977 (aged 19)		(Hungary) BVSC Budapest
13	DF	Róbert Lóczi	20 August 1977 (aged 19)		(Hungary) Budapest Honvéd
14	MF	Péter Vörös	14 December 1977 (aged 19)		(Hungary) MTK Hungária
15	FW	Csaba Csordás	9 August 1977 (aged 19)		(Hungary) BVSC Budapest
16	FW	Zoltán Szabó	23 August 1977 (aged 19)		(Hungary) III. Kerületi TUE
17	MF	Bálint Lukács	15 August 1977 (aged 19)		(Hungary) Budapest Honvéd
18	MF	Gergely Balogh	14 October 1977 (aged 19)		(Hungary) Budapest Honvéd

== Group F ==
=== England ===
No.	Pos.	Player	Date of birth (age)	Caps	Club
1	GK	David Lucas	23 November 1977 (aged 19)		(England) Preston North End
2	DF	**Matthew Upson**	18 April 1979 (aged 18)		(England) Luton Town
3	MF	Jason Crowe	30 September 1978 (aged 18)		(England) Arsenal
4	MF	Ronnie Wallwork	10 September 1977 (aged 19)		(England) Manchester United
5	DF	John Curtis	3 September 1978 (aged 18)		(England) Manchester United
6	DF	Marlon Broomes	28 November 1977 (aged 19)		(England) Blackburn Rovers
7	MF	Jody Morris	22 December 1978 (aged 18)		(England) Chelsea
8	DF	**Jamie Carragher**	28 January 1978 (aged 19)		(England) Liverpool
9	FW	Ritchie Humphreys	30 November 1977 (aged 19)		(England) Sheffield Wednesday
10	MF	**Danny Murphy**	18 March 1977 (aged 20)		(England) Crewe Alexandra
11	MF	Clint Easton	1 October 1977 (aged 19)		(England) Watford
12	MF	**Kieron Dyer**	29 December 1978 (aged 18)		(England) Ipswich Town
13	GK	Mark Tyler	2 April 1977 (aged 20)		(England) Peterborough United
14	FW	**Jon Macken** (Note: Capped for the Republic of Ireland)	7 September 1977 (aged 19)		(England) Manchester United
15	FW	Paul Shepherd	17 November 1977 (aged 19)		(England) Leeds United
16	FW	**Jason Euell** (Note: Capped for Jamaica)	6 February 1977 (aged 20)		(England) Wimbledon
17	DF	Mark Jackson	30 September 1977 (aged 19)		(England) Leeds United
18	FW	**Michael Owen**	14 December 1979 (aged 17)		(England) Liverpool

=== Ivory Coast ===
No.	Pos.	Player	Date of birth (age)	Caps	Club
1	GK	Yahaya Traore	15 February 1977 (aged 20)		(Ivory Coast) Stella Club d'Adjamé
2	MF	Abraham Onene	14 April 1977 (aged 20)		(Ivory Coast) Bassam
3	DF	Aboh Miessan	12 March 1977 (aged 20)		(Ivory Coast) Albi
4	DF	Souleymane Cissé	10 August 1977 (aged 19)		(France) AS Nancy
5	DF	Serge Gogoua	1 January 1977 (aged 20)		(Ivory Coast) Sporting Gagnoa
6	DF	Mariko Daouda	13 November 1981 (aged 15)		(Ivory Coast) Sporting Gagnoa
7	MF	**Idrissa Keita**	10 April 1977 (aged 20)		(Ivory Coast) ASEC Mimosas
8	MF	Thomas Guei	28 January 1979 (aged 18)		(Ivory Coast) Stade d'Abidjan
9	MF	Baroan Tagro	5 October 1977 (aged 19)		(France) Paris Saint-Germain
10	FW	Abdoulaye Soumahoro	11 July 1978 (aged 18)		(Ivory Coast) ASEC Mimosas
11	MF	Youssouf Kamara	10 August 1981 (aged 15)		(Ivory Coast) ASEC Mimosas
12	MF	Yoossouf Tidiane	15 December 1977 (aged 19)		(Ivory Coast) Africa Sports
13	MF	Rene Nda Kouadio	12 September 1979 (aged 17)		(Ivory Coast) Stade d'Abidjan
14	DF	Seydou Mariko	26 April 1977 (aged 20)		(Ivory Coast) Africa Sports
15	FW	**Bonaventure Kalou**	12 January 1978 (aged 19)		(Ivory Coast) ASEC Mimosas
16	GK	Baffie Fofana	21 December 1977 (aged 19)		(Ivory Coast) Africa Sports
17	FW	**Félix Dja Ettien**	26 September 1979 (aged 17)		(Ivory Coast) Bassam
18	MF	**Serge Dié**	4 October 1977 (aged 19)		(Ivory Coast) Africa Sports

=== Mexico ===
No.	Pos.	Player	Date of birth (age)	Caps	Club
1	GK	Alexandro Álvarez	26 January 1977 (aged 20)		(Mexico) Necaxa
2	DF	**Mariano Trujillo**	19 May 1977 (aged 20)		(Mexico) UNAM Pumas
3	DF	**Christian Ramírez**	8 March 1978 (aged 19)		(Mexico) UNAM Pumas
4	DF	**Joaquín Beltrán**	29 April 1977 (aged 20)		(Mexico) UNAM Pumas
5	DF	**Omar Briceño**	30 January 1978 (aged 19)		(Mexico) Atlas
6	MF	**Carlos Cariño**	21 October 1977 (aged 19)		(Mexico) UNAM Pumas
7	MF	**Adrián Sánchez**	9 July 1978 (aged 18)		(Mexico) Puebla
8	FW	**Omar Avilán**	29 April 1977 (aged 20)		(Mexico) Atlas
9	FW	Eduardo Lillingston	23 December 1977 (aged 19)		(Mexico) Toluca
10	FW	Omar Santacruz	13 January 1977 (aged 20)		(Mexico) America
11	FW	Gerardo Torres	14 March 1977 (aged 20)		(Mexico) Atlas
12	GK	Esdras Rangel	31 July 1977 (aged 19)		(Mexico) UNAM Pumas
13	DF	Felipe Ayala	16 December 1977 (aged 19)		(Mexico) UANL Tigres
14	DF	**Ignacio Hierro**	22 June 1978 (aged 18)		(Mexico) America
15	MF	Héctor Valenzuela	16 December 1977 (aged 19)		(Mexico) Guadalajara
16	FW	Luís Maldonado	11 May 1979 (aged 18)		(Mexico) Monterrey
17	DF	Javier Robles	7 January 1979 (aged 18)		(Mexico) Atlas
18	FW	**Emilio Mora**	7 March 1978 (aged 19)		(Mexico) Atletico Morelia

=== United Arab Emirates ===
No.	Pos.	Player	Date of birth (age)	Caps	Club
1	GK	Abdel Al-Hammadi	1 November 1977 (aged 19)		(United Arab Emirates) Al-Wehda
2	DF	Jumaa Al-Mekaini	15 October 1977 (aged 19)		(United Arab Emirates) Al Ain
3	DF	Abdulla Essa Abdulla	6 May 1977 (aged 20)		(United Arab Emirates) Al Wasl
4	DF	Ahmed Murad	9 August 1977 (aged 19)		(United Arab Emirates) Al Ahli
5	MF	Abdul Al-Arami	23 May 1977 (aged 20)		(United Arab Emirates) Al-Wehda
6	DF	Salem Al-Shaamsi	19 August 1978 (aged 18)		(United Arab Emirates) Al Ain
7	MF	Saeed Al-Sharhan	1 October 1977 (aged 19)		(United Arab Emirates) Emirates Club
8	FW	Humaid Fakher	3 November 1978 (aged 18)		(United Arab Emirates) Al Ain
9	MF	Yousif Al-Baloushi	6 June 1978 (aged 19)		(United Arab Emirates) Al Nasr
10	FW	Yaser Salem Ali	1 December 1977 (aged 19)		(United Arab Emirates) Al-Wehda
11	FW	Salem Saad	1 September 1978 (aged 18)		(United Arab Emirates) Al-Shaab
12	DF	Abdulla Ahmed Abulla	4 February 1977 (aged 20)		(United Arab Emirates) Al Man
13	MF	Adib Al-Zaabi	15 October 1977 (aged 19)		(United Arab Emirates) Al-Wehda
14	MF	Ali Ahmed	3 June 1977 (aged 20)		(United Arab Emirates) Sharjah FC
15	FW	Mohamed Kazim	1 January 1978 (aged 19)		(United Arab Emirates) Al Nasr
16	MF	Mohamed Al-Baloushi	22 June 1977 (aged 19)		(United Arab Emirates) Al Nasr
17	GK	Ali Al-Yarees	16 February 1977 (aged 20)		(United Arab Emirates) Al Shabab
18	DF	Gharib Al-Kuwaiti	7 February 1977 (aged 20)		(United Arab Emirates) Al Ain
