= 1998–99 RCD Mallorca B season =

RCD Mallorca B
1998–99 season
- Head coach: Jesús Linares (until 22 November); Fernando Pons Niza (from 29 November)
- Stadium: Lluís Sitjar Stadium
- Segunda División: 19th (relegated)
- Top goalscorer: League: Albert Luque; Diego Tristán (15 each); All: Albert Luque; Diego Tristán (15 each)
- Biggest win: 4–1 against Barcelona B
- Biggest defeat: 0–3 against Numancia; 3–0 against Mérida; 4–1 against Numancia

The 1998–99 season was the 32nd season in the history of RCD Mallorca B and their first ever season in the second division of Spanish football. The team participated in the Segunda División. The season covered the period from 1 July 1998 to 30 June 1999.

== Competitions ==
=== Overall record ===
Competition	First match	Last match	Starting round	Final position	Record							
Competition	First match	Last match	Starting round	Final position	Pld	W	D	L	GF	GA	GD	Win %
Segunda División	30 August 1998	20 June 1999	Matchday 1	19th	42	12	10	20	52	64	−12	28.57
Total					42	12	10	20	52	64	−12	28.57

Source: Competitions

=== Segunda División ===
==== League table ====
Pos	Team	Pld	W	D	L	GF	GA	GD	Pts	Promotion, qualification or relegation
17	Leganés	42	10	17	15	36	44	−8	47	
18	Eibar	42	13	8	21	42	56	−14	47	
19	Mallorca B (R)	42	12	10	20	52	64	−12	46	Relegation to Segunda División B
20	Barcelona B (R)	42	13	5	24	51	68	−17	44	Relegation to Segunda División B
21	Hércules (R)	42	10	10	22	38	66	−28	40	Relegation to Segunda División B

Rules for classification: 1st points; 2nd head-to-head points; 3rd head-to-head goal difference; 4th head-to-head goals scored; 5th goal difference; 6th number of goals scored; 7th Fair-play points
(R) Relegated

==== Results summary ====
Overall								Home						Away					
Pld	W	D	L	GF	GA	GD	Pts	W	D	L	GF	GA	GD	W	D	L	GF	GA	GD
42	12	10	20	52	64	−12	46	6	9	6	29	27	+2	6	1	14	23	37	−14

Source: Segunda División

==== Results by round ====
Round	1	2	3	4	5	6	7	8	9	10	11	12	13	14	15	16	17	18	19	20	21	22	23	24	25	26	27	28	29	30	31	32	33	34	35	36	37	38	39	40	41	42
Ground	H	A	H	A	H	A	A	H	A	H	A	H	A	H	A	H	A	H	A	H	A	A	H	A	H	A	H	H	A	H	A	H	A	H	A	H	A	H	A	H	A	H
Result	W	W	L	W	W	L	L	L	L	D	L	L	L	D	W	W	L	W	W	D	L	W	D	L	L	L	W	L	L	D	W	D	L	D	L	W	L	D	D	D	L	L
Position																																										

Source: Segunda División
A = Away; H = Home; W = Win; D = Draw; L = Loss

==== Matches ====
30 August 1998 1	Mallorca B	4–1	Barcelona B	Palma
--:-- CEST (UTC+2)				Stadium: Lluís Sitjar

6 September 1998 2	Albacete	0–2	Mallorca B	Albacete
--:-- CEST (UTC+2)				Stadium: Carlos Belmonte

14 September 1998 3	Mallorca B	0–1	Toledo	Palma
--:-- CEST (UTC+2)				Stadium: Lluís Sitjar

19 September 1998 4	Eibar	0–1	Mallorca B	Eibar
--:-- CET (UTC+1)				Stadium: Ipurua

28 September 1998 5	Mallorca B	2–0	Sporting Gijón	Palma
--:-- CEST (UTC+2)				Stadium: Lluís Sitjar

3 October 1998 6	Las Palmas	4–2	Mallorca B	Las Palmas
--:-- CET (UTC+1)				Stadium: Insular

11 October 1998 7	Málaga	2–1	Mallorca B	Málaga
--:-- CET (UTC+1)				Stadium: La Rosaleda

19 October 1998 8	Mallorca B	3–4	Atlético Madrid B	Palma
--:-- CEST (UTC+2)				Stadium: Lluís Sitjar

25 October 1998 9	Rayo Vallecano	2–1	Mallorca B	Madrid
--:-- CEST (UTC+2)				Stadium: Vallecas

1 November 1998 10	Mallorca B	1–1	Logroñés	Palma
--:-- CET (UTC+1)				Stadium: Lluís Sitjar

7 November 1998 11	Lleida	1–0	Mallorca B	Lleida
--:-- CET (UTC+1)				Stadium: Camp d'Esports

15 November 1998 12	Mallorca B	0–3	Numancia	Palma
--:-- CET (UTC+1)				Stadium: Lluís Sitjar

22 November 1998 13	Compostela	2–0	Mallorca B	Santiago de Compostela
--:-- CEST (UTC+2)				Stadium: San Lázaro

29 November 1998 14	Mallorca B	0–0	Sevilla	Palma
--:-- CET (UTC+1)				Stadium: Lluís Sitjar

5 December 1998 15	Ourense	1–2	Mallorca B	Ourense
--:-- CEST (UTC+2)				Stadium: Estadio de O Couto

12 December 1998 16	Mallorca B	2–1	Recreativo	Palma
--:-- CET (UTC+1)				Stadium: Lluís Sitjar

19 December 1998 17	Mérida	3–0	Mallorca B	Mérida
--:-- CEST (UTC+2)				Stadium: Romano

2 January 1999 18	Mallorca B	2–1	Leganés	Palma
--:-- CET (UTC+1)				Stadium: Lluís Sitjar

10 January 1999 19	Badajoz	0–1	Mallorca B	Badajoz
--:-- CEST (UTC+2)				Stadium: Nuevo Vivero

17 January 1999 20	Mallorca B	1–1	Osasuna	Palma
--:-- CET (UTC+1)				Stadium: Lluís Sitjar

24 January 1999 21	Hércules	2–1	Mallorca B	Alicante
--:-- CEST (UTC+2)				Stadium: José Rico Pérez

30 January 1999 22	Barcelona B	1–2	Mallorca B	Barcelona
--:-- CET (UTC+1)				Stadium: Mini Estadi

7 February 1999 23	Mallorca B	0–0	Albacete	Palma
--:-- CET (UTC+1)				Stadium: Lluís Sitjar

14 February 1999 24	Toledo	1–0	Mallorca B	Toledo
--:-- CEST (UTC+2)				Stadium: Salto del Caballo

20 February 1999 25	Mallorca B	0–1	Eibar	Palma
--:-- CET (UTC+1)				Stadium: Lluís Sitjar

28 February 1999 26	Sporting Gijón	3–2	Mallorca B	Gijón
--:-- CEST (UTC+2)				Stadium: El Molinón

6 March 1999 27	Mallorca B	2–0	Las Palmas	Palma
--:-- CET (UTC+1)				Stadium: Lluís Sitjar

14 March 1999 28	Mallorca B	0–1	Málaga	Palma
--:-- CET (UTC+1)				Stadium: Lluís Sitjar

20 March 1999 29	Atlético Madrid B	2–1	Mallorca B	Madrid
--:-- CET (UTC+1)				Stadium: Cerro del Espino

28 March 1999 30	Mallorca B	4–4	Rayo Vallecano	Palma
--:-- CET (UTC+1)				Stadium: Lluís Sitjar

4 April 1999 31	Logroñés	0–1	Mallorca B	Logroño
--:-- CET (UTC+1)				Stadium: Las Gaunas

11 April 1999 32	Mallorca B	1–1	Lleida	Palma
--:-- CET (UTC+1)				Stadium: Lluís Sitjar

18 April 1999 33	Numancia	4–1	Mallorca B	Soria
--:-- CET (UTC+1)				Stadium: Municipal Los Pajaritos

26 April 1999 34	Mallorca B	1–1	Compostela	Palma
--:-- CET (UTC+1)				Stadium: Lluís Sitjar

1 May 1999 35	Sevilla	3–1	Mallorca B	Seville
--:-- CEST (UTC+2)				Stadium: Ramón Sánchez Pizjuán

10 May 1999 36	Mallorca B	2–0	Ourense	Palma
--:-- CET (UTC+1)	Tristán 88'; Escalas 89'			Stadium: Lluís Sitjar; Referee: Xavier Moreno Delgado

16 May 1999 37	Recreativo	3–2	Mallorca B	Huelva
--:-- CET (UTC+1)				Stadium: Nuevo Colombino; Referee: Javier Turienzo Álvarez

24 May 1999 38	Mallorca B	0–0	Mérida	Palma
--:-- CET (UTC+1)				Stadium: Lluís Sitjar; Referee: Alfonso Pino Zamorano

30 May 1999 39	Leganés	0–0	Mallorca B	Leganés
--:-- CET (UTC+1)				Stadium: Butarque; Referee: Alexis Manuel Pérez Pérez

6 June 1999 40	Mallorca B	3–3	Badajoz	Palma
--:-- CET (UTC+1)				Stadium: Lluís Sitjar; Referee: Ignacio Fernández Hinojosa

13 June 1999 41	Osasuna	3–2	Mallorca B	Pamplona
--:-- CET (UTC+1)	Alfredo 14'; Palacios 40'; Tiko 78'		Escalas 35'; Ivo 89'	Stadium: El Sadar; Referee: Carlos Campos Andreu

20 June 1999 42	Mallorca B	1–3	Hércules	Palma
--:-- CET (UTC+1)	Escalas 70'		Deus 5'; Conte 22' (pen.), 87' (pen.)	Stadium: Lluís Sitjar; Referee: Xabier Eleicegui Uranga
