= 1998–99 Hércules CF season =

Hércules
1998–99 season
- President: Francisco Peris Pastor (until 26 November); Francisco Muñoz Llorens (interim); Antonio Alberola
- Head coach: Sergio Egea; Periko Alonso; Manolo Jiménez
- Stadium: Estadio José Rico Pérez
- Segunda División: 21st (relegated)
- Copa del Rey: First round
- Top goalscorer: League: Luna (6); All: Luna (6)

The 1998–99 season was the 77th in the history of Hércules CF and their second consecutive season in the second division. The club participated in the Segunda División and the Copa del Rey. The season covered the period from 1 July 1998 to 30 June 1999.

Hércules finished 21st in the league table and were relegated after the season.

== Transfers ==
=== In ===
No.	Pos.	Player	Transferred from	Fee	Date	Source
	DF	(Spain) José Luis Baroja	Albacete		1 July 1998	
	DF	(Spain) Juanmi Gelabert	Elche		1 July 1998	
	MF	(Sweden) Nemanja Miljanović	Salamanca		1 July 1998	
	FW	(Slovenia) Milan Osterc	(Slovenia) Gorica		1 July 1998	
	GK	(Spain) José Belman	Valladolid		7 July 1998	
	MF	(Spain) Javi Prats	Villarreal		4 January 1999	

=== Out ===
No.	Pos.	Player	Transferred from	Fee	Date	Source
	FW	(Spain) Bolo	Oviedo	Free	1 July 1998	
	DF	(Spain) Fernando Giner	Levante		1 July 1998	
	FW	(Bosnia and Herzegovina) Ranko Golijanin	(Federal Republic of Yugoslavia) Radnički Kragujevac		1 July 1998	

== Competitions ==
=== Overall record ===
Competition	First match	Last match	Starting round	Final position	Record							
Competition	First match	Last match	Starting round	Final position	Pld	W	D	L	GF	GA	GD	Win %
Segunda División	29 August 1998	20 June 1999	Matchday 1	21st	42	10	10	22	38	66	−28	23.81
Copa del Rey	2 September 1998	9 September 1998	Round of 64	First round	2	0	1	1	1	2	−1	0.00
Total					44	10	11	23	39	68	−29	22.73

Source: Competitions

=== Segunda División ===
==== League table ====
Pos	Team	Pld	W	D	L	GF	GA	GD	Pts	Promotion, qualification or relegation
18	Eibar	42	13	8	21	42	56	−14	47	
19	Mallorca B (R)	42	12	10	20	52	64	−12	46	Relegation to Segunda División B
20	Barcelona B (R)	42	13	5	24	51	68	−17	44	Relegation to Segunda División B
21	Hércules (R)	42	10	10	22	38	66	−28	40	Relegation to Segunda División B
22	Ourense (R)	42	7	6	29	35	82	−47	27	Relegation to Segunda División B

Rules for classification: 1st points; 2nd head-to-head points; 3rd head-to-head goal difference; 4th head-to-head goals scored; 5th goal difference; 6th number of goals scored; 7th Fair-play points
(R) Relegated

==== Results summary ====
Overall								Home						Away					
Pld	W	D	L	GF	GA	GD	Pts	W	D	L	GF	GA	GD	W	D	L	GF	GA	GD
42	10	10	22	38	66	−28	40	6	7	8	17	26	−9	4	3	14	21	40	−19

Source: Segunda División

==== Results by round ====
Round	1	2	3	4	5	6	7	8	9	10	11	12	13	14	15	16	17	18	19	20	21	22	23	24	25	26	27	28	29	30	31	32	33	34	35	36	37	38	39	40	41	42
Ground	A	H	A	H	A	H	A	H	A	H	A	H	A	H	H	A	H	A	H	A	H	H	A	H	A	H	A	H	A	H	A	H	A	H	A	A	H	A	H	A	H	A
Result	W	D	L	L	L	W	L	L	L	D	D	W	D	L	L	L	W	L	W	L	W	L	L	D	L	D	L	D	W	D	L	L	D	D	L	L	W	W	L	L	L	W
Position																																										

Source: Segunda División
A = Away; H = Home; W = Win; D = Draw; L = Loss

==== Matches ====
29 August 1998 1	Atlético Madrid B	2–3	Hércules	Madrid
--:-- CEST (UTC+2)

5 September 1998 2	Hércules	1–1	Rayo Vallecano	Alicante
--:-- CEST (UTC+2)				Stadium: Estadio José Rico Pérez

13 September 1998 3	Logroñés	2–1	Hércules	Logroño
--:-- CEST (UTC+2)

19 September 1998 4	Hércules	0–3	Lleida	Alicante
--:-- CEST (UTC+2)				Stadium: Estadio José Rico Pérez

27 September 1998 5	Numancia	2–0	Hércules	Soria
--:-- CEST (UTC+2)

3 October 1998 6	Hércules	3–2	Compostela	Alicante
--:-- CEST (UTC+2)				Stadium: Estadio José Rico Pérez

10 October 1998 7	Sevilla	1–0	Hércules	Seville
--:-- CEST (UTC+2)

18 October 1998 8	Hércules	0–2	Ourense	Alicante
--:-- CEST (UTC+2)				Stadium: Estadio José Rico Pérez

25 October 1998 9	Recreativo	1–0	Hércules	TBD
--:-- CEST (UTC+2)

1 November 1998 10	Hércules	0–0	Mérida	Alicante
--:-- CEST (UTC+2)				Stadium: Estadio José Rico Pérez

8 November 1998 11	Leganés	2–2	Hércules	TBD
--:-- CEST (UTC+2)

15 November 1998 12	Hércules	2–0	Badajoz	Alicante
--:-- CEST (UTC+2)				Stadium: Estadio José Rico Pérez

21 November 1998 13	Osasuna	0–0	Hércules	TBD
--:-- CEST (UTC+2)

28 November 1998 14	Hércules	0–3	Málaga	Alicante
--:-- CEST (UTC+2)				Stadium: Estadio José Rico Pérez

6 December 1998 15	Hércules	1–2	Barcelona B	Alicante
--:-- CEST (UTC+2)				Stadium: Estadio José Rico Pérez

13 December 1998 16	Albacete	3–1	Hércules	TBD
--:-- CEST (UTC+2)

20 December 1998 17	Hércules	1–0	Toledo	Alicante
--:-- CEST (UTC+2)				Stadium: Estadio José Rico Pérez

2 January 1999 18	Eibar	1–0	Hércules	TBD
--:-- CEST (UTC+2)

10 January 1999 19	Hércules	1–0	Sporting Gijón	Alicante
--:-- CEST (UTC+2)				Stadium: Estadio José Rico Pérez

17 January 1999 20	Las Palmas	4–2	Hércules	TBD
--:-- CEST (UTC+2)

24 January 1999 21	Hércules	2–1	Mallorca B	Alicante
--:-- CEST (UTC+2)				Stadium: Estadio José Rico Pérez

31 January 1999 22	Hércules	1–3	Atlético Madrid B	Alicante
--:-- CEST (UTC+2)				Stadium: Estadio José Rico Pérez

7 February 1999 23	Rayo Vallecano	3–0	Hércules	Madrid
--:-- CEST (UTC+2)

14 February 1999 24	Hércules	1–1	Logroñés	Alicante
--:-- CEST (UTC+2)				Stadium: Estadio José Rico Pérez

20 February 1999 25	Lleida	1–0	Hércules	Lleida
--:-- CEST (UTC+2)

28 February 1999 26	Hércules	0–0	Numancia	Alicante
--:-- CEST (UTC+2)				Stadium: Estadio José Rico Pérez

6 March 1999 27	Compostela	3–1	Hércules	Santiago de Compostela
--:-- CEST (UTC+2)

14 March 1999 28	Hércules	0–0	Sevilla	Alicante
--:-- CEST (UTC+2)				Stadium: Estadio José Rico Pérez

21 March 1999 29	Ourense	1–2	Hércules	Ourense
--:-- CEST (UTC+2)

28 March 1999 30	Hércules	0–0	Recreativo	Alicante
--:-- CEST (UTC+2)				Stadium: Estadio José Rico Pérez

3 April 1999 31	Mérida	3–1	Hércules	Mérida
--:-- CEST (UTC+2)

10 April 1999 32	Hércules	0–1	Leganés	Alicante
--:-- CEST (UTC+2)				Stadium: Estadio José Rico Pérez

18 April 1999 33	Badajoz	1–1	Hércules	Badajoz
--:-- CEST (UTC+2)

25 April 1999 34	Hércules	1–1	Osasuna	Alicante
--:-- CEST (UTC+2)				Stadium: Estadio José Rico Pérez

2 May 1999 35	Málaga	2–1	Hércules	Málaga
--:-- CEST (UTC+2)				Stadium: La Rosaleda; Referee: Víctor Manuel González González

9 May 1999 36	Barcelona B	4–1	Hércules	Barcelona
--:-- CEST (UTC+2)				Stadium: Mini Estadi; Referee: Carmelo Rodríguez Martel

15 May 1999 37	Hércules	2–1	Albacete	Alicante
--:-- CEST (UTC+2)				Stadium: Estadio José Rico Pérez; Referee: Antoni Llonch Andreu

23 May 1999 38	Toledo	1–2	Hércules	Toledo
--:-- CEST (UTC+2)				Stadium: Salto del Caballo; Referee: Miguel Carlos Román González

29 May 1999 39	Hércules	1–3	Eibar	Alicante
--:-- CEST (UTC+2)				Stadium: Estadio José Rico Pérez; Referee: Jesús Téllez Sánchez

6 June 1999 40	Sporting Gijón	2–0	Hércules	Gijón
--:-- CEST (UTC+2)				Stadium: El Molinón; Referee: Javier Turienzo Álvarez

13 June 1999 41	Hércules	0–2	Las Palmas	Alicante
--:-- CEST (UTC+2)				Stadium: Estadio José Rico Pérez; Referee: Alberto Undiano Mallenco

20 June 1999 42	Mallorca B	1–3	Hércules	Palma
--:-- CEST (UTC+2)	Escalas 70'		Deus 5'; Conte 22' (pen.), 87' (pen.)	Stadium: Lluís Sitjar; Referee: Xabier Eleicegui Uranga

=== Copa del Rey ===
==== First round ====
2 September 1998 First leg	Elche	1–0	Hércules	Elche
--:-- CEST (UTC+2)				Stadium: Martínez Valero

9 September 1998 Second leg	Hércules	1–1 (1–2 agg.)	Elche	Alicante
--:-- CEST (UTC+2)	Paquito 68' (pen.)		Armentano 55'	Stadium: Estadio José Rico Pérez
