= 1997 FIFA World Youth Championship =

Piala Dunia B-20 FIFA 1997 Piala Dunia Belia FIFA 1997

Tournament details
- Host country: Malaysia
- Dates: 16 June – 5 July
- Teams: 24 (from 6 confederations)
- Venues: 6 (in 6 host cities)

Final positions
- Champions: Argentina (3rd title)
- Runners-up: Uruguay
- Third place: Republic of Ireland
- Fourth place: Ghana

Tournament statistics
- Matches played: 52
- Goals scored: 165 (3.17 per match)
- Attendance: 655,827 (12,612 per match)
- Top scorer: (Brazil) Adaílton (10 goals)
- Best player: (Uruguay) Nicolás Olivera
- Fair play award: Argentina

The 1997 FIFA World Youth Championship, known as the 1997 FIFA/Coca-Cola World Youth Championship for sponsorship purposes, was the 11th staging of the FIFA World Youth Championship. It was held from 16 June to 5 July 1997 in Malaysia. It was the first FIFA tournament hosted by a Southeast Asian country.

== Venues ==
Shah Alam	Kuching	Alor Setar
Shah Alam Stadium	Sarawak Stadium	Darul Aman Stadium
Capacity: 80,000	Capacity: 40,000	Capacity: 32,387
1997 FIFA World Youth Championship is located in Malaysia
Kuantan	Kangar	Johor Bahru
Darul Makmur Stadium	Tuanku Syed Putra Stadium	Tan Sri Hassan Yunus Stadium
Capacity: 40,000	Capacity: 20,000	Capacity: 30,000

== Qualification ==
The following 24 teams qualified for the 1997 FIFA World Youth Championship. Host Malaysia did not have to qualify for the tournament.

Confederation	Qualifying tournament	Qualifier(s)
AFC (Asia)	Host nation	Malaysia^{1}
AFC (Asia)	1996 AFC Youth Championship	China; Japan; South Korea; United Arab Emirates^{1}
CAF (Africa)	1997 African Youth Championship	Ivory Coast; Ghana; Morocco; South Africa^{1}
CONCACAF (North, Central America & Caribbean)	1996 CONCACAF U-20 Tournament	Canada; Costa Rica; Mexico; United States
CONMEBOL (South America)	1997 South American Youth Championship	Argentina; Brazil; Paraguay; Uruguay
OFC (Oceania)	1997 OFC U-20 Championship	Australia
UEFA (Europe)	1996 UEFA European Under-18 Football Championship	Belgium^{1} England; France; Hungary; Republic of Ireland; Spain

1.Teams that made their debut.

== Squads ==
For a list of all squads that played in the final tournament, see 1997 FIFA World Youth Championship squads

== Group stage ==
The 24 teams were split into six groups of four teams. Six group winners, six-second-place finishers and the four best third-place finishers qualify for the knockout round.

=== Group A ===
Pos	Team	Pld	W	D	L	GF	GA	GD	Pts	Group stage result
1	Uruguay	3	2	1	0	6	1	+5	7	Advance to knockout stage
2	Morocco	3	1	2	0	4	2	+2	5	Advance to knockout stage
3	Belgium	3	1	1	1	4	4	0	4	Advance to knockout stage
4	Malaysia (H)	3	0	0	3	2	9	−7	0	

(H) Hosts
16 June 1997
21:00

Malaysia	1–3	Morocco
Safri 10' (o.g.)	(Report)	Sektioui 14'; Khamma 33'; El Barodi 93'

Shah Alam Stadium, Shah Alam
Attendance: 25,000
Referee: Gilles Veissière (France)

17 June 1997
20:00

Uruguay	3–0	Belgium
Podestá 41'; Coelho 56', 79'	(Report)

Shah Alam Stadium, Shah Alam
Attendance: 2,000
Referee: Kim Young-joo (South Korea)

19 June 1997
17:30

Malaysia	1–3	Uruguay
Fadly 11'	(Report)	Zalayeta 24'; Khairun 39' (o.g.); López 77'

Shah Alam Stadium, Shah Alam
Attendance: 10,000
Referee: Gilles Veissière (France)

19 June 1997
20:00

Morocco	1–1	Belgium
Termina 79'	(Report)	Van Handenhoven 60'

Shah Alam Stadium, Shah Alam
Attendance: 8,000
Referee: Ubaldo Aquino (Paraguay)

22 June 1997
17:30

Malaysia	0–3	Belgium
	(Report)	Van Handenhoven 10', 30'; Remacle 83'

Shah Alam Stadium, Shah Alam
Attendance: 25,000
Referee: Ubaldo Aquino (Paraguay)

22 June 1997
20:00

Morocco	0–0	Uruguay
	(Report)

Shah Alam Stadium, Shah Alam
Attendance: 25,000
Referee: Kim Young-joo (South Korea)

=== Group B ===
Pos	Team	Pld	W	D	L	GF	GA	GD	Pts	Group stage result
1	Brazil	3	3	0	0	15	3	+12	9	Advance to knockout stage
2	France	3	2	0	1	8	7	+1	6	Advance to knockout stage
3	South Africa	3	0	1	2	2	6	−4	1	
4	South Korea	3	0	1	2	5	14	−9	1	

17 June 1997
16:30

South Korea	0–0	South Africa
	(Report)

Sarawak Stadium, Kuching
Attendance: 20,000
Referee: Georg Dardenne (Germany)

17 June 1997
20:45

France	0–3	Brazil
	(Report)	Alex 5'; Adaílton 61'; Silvestre 90' (o.g.)

Sarawak Stadium, Kuching
Attendance: 40,000
Referee: Nik Ahmad Haji Yaakub (Malaysia)

19 June 1997
16:30

South Korea	2–4	France
Park Jin-sub 54', 68' (pen.)	(Report)	Henry 1', 10'; Trezeguet 2', 52'

Sarawak Stadium, Kuching
Attendance: 3,246
Referee: Peter Prendergast (Jamaica)

19 June 1997
19:15

South Africa	0–2	Brazil
	(Report)	Adaílton 53', 57'

Sarawak Stadium, Kuching
Attendance: 7,939
Referee: Georg Dardenne (Germany)

22 June 1997
16:30

South Korea	3–10	Brazil
Lee Kwan-woo 56'; Chung Seok-keun 73'; Lee Jung-min 89'	(Report)	Fernandão 19', 42'; Adaílton 30', 32' (pen.), 35' (pen.), 39', 63', 69'; Zé Elias 68', 82'

Sarawak Stadium, Kuching
Attendance: 9,576
Referee: Nik Ahmad Haji Yaakub (Malaysia)

22 June 1997
19:15

South Africa	2–4	France
Hartley 42', 90'	(Report)	Trezeguet 22', 61'; Henry 83'; Luccin 89'

Sarawak Stadium, Kuching
Attendance: 9,757
Referee: Peter Prendergast (Jamaica)

=== Group C ===
Pos	Team	Pld	W	D	L	GF	GA	GD	Pts	Group stage result
1	Ghana	3	2	1	0	4	2	+2	7	Advance to knockout stage
2	Republic of Ireland	3	1	1	1	4	4	0	4	Advance to knockout stage
3	United States	3	1	0	2	2	3	−1	3	Advance to knockout stage
4	China	3	0	2	1	2	3	−1	2	

17 June 1997
17:30

Ghana	2–1	Republic of Ireland
Gambo 27'; Mouktar 66'	(Report)	Molloy 51'

Darul Aman Stadium, Alor Setar
Attendance: 5,100
Referee: Óscar Ruiz (Colombia)

17 June 1997
20:00

China	0–1	United States
	(Report)	West 90'

Darul Aman Stadium, Alor Setar
Attendance: 9,769
Referee: Armand Ancion (Belgium)

19 June 1997
17:30

Ghana	1–1	China
Appiah 74'	(Report)	Li Jinyu 43'

Darul Aman Stadium, Alor Setar
Attendance: 5,000
Referee: León Padro Borja (Mexico)

19 June 1997
20:00

Republic of Ireland	2–1	United States
Cummins 6'; Corrales 25' (o.g.)	(Report)	Flores 39' (pen.)

Darul Aman Stadium, Alor Setar
Attendance: 5,000
Referee: Oscar Ruiz (Colombia)

22 June 1997
17:30

Ghana	1–0	United States
Ofori-Quaye 32'	(Report)

Darul Aman Stadium, Alor Setar
Attendance: 8,000
Referee: Saad Mane (Kuwait)

22 June 1997
20:00

Republic of Ireland	1–1	China
Cummins 21'	(Report)	Wang Peng 11'

Darul Aman Stadium, Alor Setar
Attendance: 9,000
Referee: José Luis da Rosa Varela (Uruguay)

=== Group D ===
Pos	Team	Pld	W	D	L	GF	GA	GD	Pts	Group stage result
1	Spain	3	3	0	0	8	2	+6	9	Advance to knockout stage
2	Japan	3	1	1	1	10	7	+3	4	Advance to knockout stage
3	Paraguay	3	0	2	1	5	6	−1	2	
4	Costa Rica	3	0	1	2	3	11	−8	1	

18 June 1997
17:30

Japan	1–2	Spain
Yanagisawa 65' (pen.)	(Report)	Farinós 23'; Angulo 56'

Darulmakmur Stadium, Kuantan
Attendance: 5,000
Referee: José Luis da Rosa Varela (Uruguay)

18 June 1997
20:00

Costa Rica	1–1	Paraguay
Bryce 45'	(Report)	Román 59'

Darulmakmur Stadium, Kuantan
Attendance: 5,000
Referee: Saad Mane (Kuwait)

20 June 1997
17:30

Japan	6–2	Costa Rica
Ono 3', 22'; Nakamura 7'; Jojo 78'; Fukuda 93'; Nagai 95'	(Report)	Ledezma 28'; Solís 59'

Darulmakmur Stadium, Kuantan
Attendance: 9,000
Referee: José Luis da Rosa Varela (Uruguay)

20 June 1997
20:00

Spain	2–1	Paraguay
Deus 30', 78'	(Report)	Morinigo 65'

Darulmakmur Stadium, Kuantan
Attendance: 9,000
Referee: Saad Mane (Kuwait)

23 June 1997
17:30

Japan	3–3	Paraguay
Jojo 31'; Hiroyama 45'; Yanagisawa 62'	(Report)	Cáceres 17'; Da Silva 38'; Samudio 67'

Darulmakmur Stadium, Kuantan
Attendance: 5,000
Referee: Abderrahim El Arjoun (Morocco)

23 June 1997
20:00

Spain	4–0	Costa Rica
Rivera 3'; Albelda 23'; Farinós 24' (pen.); Ribera 78'	(Report)

Darulmakmur Stadium, Kuantan
Attendance: 5,000
Referee: Karl-Erik Nilsson (Sweden)

=== Group E ===
Pos	Team	Pld	W	D	L	GF	GA	GD	Pts	Group stage result
1	Australia	3	2	1	0	5	3	+2	7	Advance to knockout stage
2	Argentina	3	2	0	1	8	5	+3	6	Advance to knockout stage
3	Canada	3	1	1	1	3	3	0	4	Advance to knockout stage
4	Hungary	3	0	0	3	1	6	−5	0	

18 June 1997
17:30

Hungary	0–3	Argentina
	(Report)	Romeo 9'; Scaloni 42'; Riquelme 50'

Utama Stadium, Kangar
Attendance: 13,000
Referee: Abderrahim El Arjoun (Morocco)

18 June 1997
20:00

Australia	0–0	Canada
	(Report)

Utama Stadium, Kangar
Attendance: 13,000
Referee: Karl-Erik Nilsson (Sweden)

20 June 1997
17:30

Hungary	0–1	Australia
	(Report)	Allsopp 90'

Utama Stadium, Kangar
Attendance: 6,000
Referee: Abderrahim El Arjoun (Morocco)

20 June 1997
20:00

Argentina	2–1	Canada
Romeo 32'; Riquelme 65'	(Report)	Bent 43' (pen.)

Utama Stadium, Kangar
Attendance: 12,000
Referee: Karl-Erik Nilsson (Sweden)

23 June 1997
17:30

Hungary	1–2	Canada
Szili 3' (pen.)	(Report)	De Rosario 6'; Kindel 64'

Utama Stadium, Kangar
Attendance: 4,000
Referee: León Padro Borja (Mexico)

23 June 1997
20:00

Argentina	3–4	Australia
Romeo 9'; Placente 70'; Riquelme 88' (pen.)	(Report)	Salapasidis 39', 40', 55', 90' (pen.)

Utama Stadium, Kangar
Attendance: 8,000
Referee: Armand Ancion (Belgium)

=== Group F ===
Pos	Team	Pld	W	D	L	GF	GA	GD	Pts	Group stage result
1	England	3	3	0	0	8	1	+7	9	Advance to knockout stage
2	Mexico	3	1	1	1	6	2	+4	4	Advance to knockout stage
3	United Arab Emirates	3	1	0	2	2	10	−8	3	Advance to knockout stage
4	Ivory Coast	3	0	1	2	2	5	−3	1	

18 June 1997
17:30

Mexico	5–0	United Arab Emirates
Lillingston 26', 56' (pen.); Cariño 40'; Torres 60'; Santacruz 70'	(Report)

Larkin Stadium, Johor Bahru
Attendance: 14,000
Referee: Sándor Piller (Hungary)

18 June 1997
20:00

Ivory Coast	1–2	England
Cissé 22'	(Report)	Owen 6' (pen.); Shepherd 69'

Larkin Stadium, Johor Bahru
Attendance: 14,000
Referee: Intaz Shah (Fiji)

20 June 1997
17:30

Mexico	1–1	Ivory Coast
Lillingston 44'	(Report)	Dié 33'

Larkin Stadium, Johor Bahru
Attendance: 9,000
Referee: Intaz Shah (Fiji)

20 June 1997
20:00

United Arab Emirates	0–5	England
	(Report)	Murphy 7', 35', 50' (pen.); Owen 52'; Abdulla 60' (o.g.)

Larkin Stadium, Johor Bahru
Attendance: 12,000
Referee: Falla N'Doye (Senegal)

23 June 1997
17:30

Mexico	0–1	England
	(Report)	Owen 65'

Larkin Stadium, Johor Bahru
Attendance: 9,000
Referee: Falla N'Doye (Senegal)

23 June 1997
20:00

United Arab Emirates	2–0	Ivory Coast
Ali 52'; Kazim 85'	(Report)

Larkin Stadium, Johor Bahru
Attendance: 9,000
Referee: Sándor Piller (Hungary)

=== Ranking of third-placed teams ===
Pos	Grp	Team	Pld	W	D	L	GF	GA	GD	Pts	Result
1	A	Belgium	3	1	1	1	4	4	0	4	Advance to knockout stage
2	E	Canada	3	1	1	1	3	3	0	4	Advance to knockout stage
3	C	United States	3	1	0	2	2	3	−1	3	Advance to knockout stage
4	F	United Arab Emirates	3	1	0	2	2	10	−8	3	Advance to knockout stage
5	D	Paraguay	3	0	2	1	5	6	−1	2	
6	B	South Africa	3	0	1	2	2	6	−4	1	

== Knockout stage ==
Round of 16
25 June – Shah Alam
Uruguay	3
United States	0
25 June – Kuching
Mexico	0
France	1
26 June – Kangar
Australia	0
Japan	1
26 June – Alor Setar
Ghana	3
United Arab Emirates	0
26 June – Kuantan
Spain	2
Canada	0
25 June – Shah Alam
Republic of Ireland (a.e.t.)	2
Morocco	1
26 June – Johor Bahru
England	1
Argentina	2
25 June – Kuching
Brazil	10
Belgium	0

Quarter-finals
29 June – Shah Alam
Uruguay (p)	1 (7)
France	1 (6)
29 June – Johor Bahru
Japan	1
Ghana (a.e.t.)	2
29 June – Shah Alam
Spain	0
Republic of Ireland	1
29 June – Kuching
Argentina	2
Brazil	0

Semi-finals
2 July – Shah Alam
Uruguay (a.e.t.)	3
Ghana	2
2 July – Kuching
Republic of Ireland	0
Argentina	1

Final
5 July – Shah Alam
Uruguay	1
Argentina	2
Third place
5 July – Shah Alam
Ghana	1
Republic of Ireland	2

=== Round of 16 ===
25 June 1997
16:15

Brazil	10–0	Belgium
Álvaro 3', 13'; Éder Gaúcho 32'; Alex 41', 48', 85'; Roni 67', 78'; Adaílton 82'; Zé Elias 87'	(Report)

Sarawak Stadium, Kuching
Attendance: 8,267
Referee: Saad Mane (Kuwait)

25 June 1997
17:30

Uruguay	3–0	United States
Zalayeta 24', 34'; Olivera 41'	(Report)

Shah Alam Stadium, Shah Alam
Attendance: 2,500
Referee: Georg Dardenne (Germany)

25 June 1997
19:15

Mexico	0–1	France
	(Report)	Luccin 90'

Sarawak Stadium, Kuching
Attendance: 10,101
Referee: Ubaldo Aquino (Paraguay)

25 June 1997
20:30

Republic of Ireland	2–1 (a.e.t.)	Morocco
Fenn 35'; Duff 97'	(Report)	Inman 43' (o.g.)

Shah Alam Stadium, Shah Alam
Attendance: 3,000
Referee: Peter Prendergast (Jamaica)

26 June 1997
16:30

Australia	0–1	Japan
	(Report)	Yanagisawa 44'

Utama Stadium, Kangar
Attendance: 8,000
Referee: León Padro Borja (Mexico)

26 June 1997
17:15

England	1–2	Argentina
Carragher 49'	(Report)	Riquelme 10' (pen.); Aimar 26'

Larkin Stadium, Johor Bahru
Attendance: 17,000
Referee: Sándor Piller (Hungary)

26 June 1997
19:40

Ghana	3–0	United Arab Emirates
Ackon 32'; Sule 79'; Issaka 88'	(Report)

Darul Aman Stadium, Alor Setar
Attendance: 17,000
Referee: Armand Ancion (Belgium)

26 June 1997
19:40

Spain	2–0	Canada
Deus 77'; Rivera 90'	(Report)

Darulmakmur Stadium, Kuantan
Attendance: 10,000
Referee: Abderrahim El Arjoun (Morocco)

=== Quarter-finals ===
29 June 1997
17:00

Uruguay	1–1 (a.e.t.)	France
Olivera 68'	(Report)	Trezeguet 27'
Penalties
	7–6

Shah Alam Stadium, Shah Alam
Attendance: 9,000
Referee: Falla N'Doye (Senegal)

29 June 1997
17:00

Argentina	2–0	Brazil
Scaloni 79'; Perezlindo 90'	(Report)

Sarawak Stadium, Kuching
Attendance: 34,896
Referee: Gilles Veissière (France)

29 June 1997
20:00

Spain	0–1	Republic of Ireland
	(Report)	Molloy 52' (pen.)

Shah Alam Stadium, Shah Alam
Attendance: 9,000
Referee: León Padro Borja (Mexico)

29 June 1997
20:00

Japan	1–2 (a.e.t.)	Ghana
Yanagisawa 80'	(Report)	Ansah 9'; Ofori-Quaye 97'

Larkin Stadium, Johor Bahru
Attendance: 18,700
Referee: Ubaldo Aquino (Paraguay)

=== Semi-finals ===
2 July 1997
16:30

Republic of Ireland	0–1	Argentina
	(Report)	Romeo 55'

Sarawak Stadium, Kuching
Attendance: 14,976
Referee: Kim Young-Joo (South Korea)

2 July 1997
20:30

Uruguay	3–2 (a.e.t.)	Ghana
Zalayeta 13'; Coelho 45'; Perea 105'	(Report)	Lawson 45'; Meloño 78' (o.g.)

Shah Alam Stadium, Shah Alam
Attendance: 15,000
Referee: Karl-Erik Nilsson (Sweden)

=== Third place play-off ===
5 July 1997
17:30

Ghana	1–2	Republic of Ireland
Sule 5'	(Report)	Baker 2'; Duff 33'

Shah Alam Stadium, Shah Alam
Attendance: 28,000
Referee: Peter Prendergast (Jamaica)

=== Final ===
5 July 1997
20:30

Uruguay	1–2	Argentina
García 15'	Report	Cambiasso 26'; Quintana 43'

Shah Alam Stadium, Shah Alam
Attendance: 62,000
Referee: Saad Mane (Kuwait)

Team details

Uruguay
Argentina

GK	1	Gustavo Munúa
DF	2	Álvaro Perea
DF	3	Martín Rivas
DF	4	Carlos Díaz	Booked
DF	6	César Pellegrín		Substituted off
DF	13	Alejandro Meloño		Substituted off
MF	5	Pablo García
MF	7	Christian Callejas	Booked	Substituted off
MF	8	Fabián Coelho
FW	9	Marcelo Zalayeta
FW	10	Nicolás Olivera
Substitutes:
MF	15	Mario Regueiro		Substituted on
MF	18	Sebastián Cartagena		Substituted on
FW	17	Rodrigo López		Substituted on
Manager:
(Uruguay) Víctor Púa

GK	1	Leo Franco
RB	18	Lionel Scaloni	Substituted off
CB	3	Walter Samuel
CB	13	Fabián Cubero
LB	2	Leandro Cufré
DM	5	Esteban Cambiasso
RM	4	Juan Serrizuela
LM	14	Diego Placente
AM	8	Juan Román Riquelme (c)
SS	7	Diego Quintana	Substituted off
CF	9	Bernardo Romeo	Substituted off
Substitutes:
MF	10	Pablo Aimar	Substituted on
MF	11	Pablo Rodríguez	Substituted on
FW	15	Martín Perezlindo	Substituted on
Manager:
(Argentina) José Pekerman

== Result ==
FIFA World Youth Championship 1997 winners

Argentina
Third title

== Awards ==
Golden Shoe	Golden Ball	Fair Play Award
(Brazil) Adaílton	(Uruguay) Nicolás Olivera	Argentina

== Goalscorers ==
Adaílton of Brazil won the Golden Boot award for scoring ten goals. In total, 165 goals were scored by 101 different players, with seven of them credited as own goals.

10 goals

- (Brazil) Adaílton

5 goals

- (France) David Trezeguet

4 goals

- (Argentina) Bernardo Romeo
- (Argentina) Juan Román Riquelme
- (Australia) Kostas Salapasidis
- (Brazil) Alex
- (Japan) Atsushi Yanagisawa
- (Uruguay) Marcelo Zalayeta

3 goals

- (Belgium) Gunter Van Handenhoven
- (Brazil) Zé Elias
- (England) Danny Murphy
- (England) Michael Owen
- (France) Thierry Henry
- (Mexico) Eduardo Lillingston
- (Spain) José Luis Deus
- (Uruguay) Fabián Coelho

2 goals

- (Argentina) Lionel Scaloni
- (Brazil) Álvaro
- (Brazil) Fernandão
- (Brazil) Rôni
- (France) Peter Luccin
- (Ghana) Baba Sule
- (Ghana) Peter Ofori-Quaye
- (Japan) Harutaka Ono
- (Japan) Shinji Jojo
- (Republic of Ireland) Damien Duff
- (Republic of Ireland) Micky Cummins
- (Republic of Ireland) Trevor Molloy
- (South Africa) Junaid Hartley
- (South Korea) Park Jin-sub
- (Spain) Alberto Rivera
- (Spain) Javier Farinós
- (Uruguay) Nicolás Olivera

1 goal

- (Argentina) Diego Placente
- (Argentina) Diego Quintana
- (Argentina) Esteban Cambiasso
- (Argentina) Martín Perezlindo
- (Argentina) Pablo Aimar
- (Australia) Daniel Allsopp
- (Brazil) Éder Gaúcho
- (Belgium) Gauthier Remacle
- (Canada) Dwayne De Rosario
- (Canada) Jason Bent
- (Canada) Steve Kindel
- (China) Li Jinyu
- (China) Wang Peng
- (Costa Rica) Alonso Solís
- (Costa Rica) Froylán Ledezma
- (Costa Rica) Steven Bryce
- (England) Jamie Carragher
- (England) Paul Shepherd
- (Ghana) Awudu Issaka
- (Ghana) Bashiru Gambo
- (Ghana) Joseph Ansah
- (Ghana) Mohamed Mouktar
- (Ghana) Odartey Lawson
- (Ghana) Richard Ackon
- (Ghana) Stephen Appiah
- (Hungary) Attila Szili
- (Ivory Coast) Serge Dié
- (Ivory Coast) Souleymane Cissé
- (Japan) Kenji Fukuda
- (Japan) Nozomi Hiroyama
- (Japan) Shunsuke Nakamura
- (Japan) Yuichiro Nagai
- (Malaysia) Nik Ahmad Fadly
- (Mexico) Carlos Cariño
- (Mexico) Gerardo Torres
- (Mexico) Omar Santacruz
- (Morocco) Aissam El Barodi
- (Morocco) Hamid Termina
- (Morocco) Khalid Khamma
- (Morocco) Tarik Sektioui
- (Paraguay) César Cáceres
- (Paraguay) Gustavo Morinigo
- (Paraguay) Juan Samudio
- (Paraguay) Paulo da Silva
- (Paraguay) Raúl Román
- (Republic of Ireland) Desmond Baker
- (Republic of Ireland) Neale Fenn
- (South Korea) Chung Seok-keun
- (South Korea) Lee Jung-min
- (South Korea) Lee Kwan-woo
- (Spain) David Albelda
- (Spain) Diego Ribera
- (Spain) Miguel Ángel Angulo
- (United Arab Emirates) Mohamed Kazim
- (United Arab Emirates) Yaser Salem Ali
- (United States) Brian West
- (United States) Jorge Flores
- (Uruguay) Álvaro Perea
- (Uruguay) Rodrigo López
- (Uruguay) Inti Podestá
- (Uruguay) Pablo García

Own goal

- (France) Mikaël Silvestre (playing against Brazil)
- (Malaysia) Khairun Haled Masrom (playing against Uruguay)
- (Morocco) Youssef Safri (playing against Malaysia)
- (Republic of Ireland) Niall Inman (playing against Morocco)
- (United Arab Emirates) Abdulla Ahmed Abdulla (playing against England)
- (United States) Ramiro Corrales (playing against Republic of Ireland)
- (Uruguay) Alejandro Meloño (playing against Ghana)

== Final ranking ==
Pos	Team	Pld	W	D	L	GF	GA	GD	Pts	Final result
1	Argentina	7	6	0	1	15	7	+8	18	Champions
2	Uruguay	7	4	2	1	14	6	+8	14	Runners-up
3	Republic of Ireland	7	4	1	2	9	7	+2	13	Third place
4	Ghana	7	4	1	2	12	8	+4	13	Fourth place
5	Brazil	5	4	0	1	25	5	+20	12	Eliminated in Quarter-finals
6	Spain	5	4	0	1	10	3	+7	12	Eliminated in Quarter-finals
7	France	5	3	1	1	10	8	+2	10	Eliminated in Quarter-finals
8	Japan	5	2	1	2	12	9	+3	7	Eliminated in Quarter-finals
9	England	4	3	0	1	9	3	+6	9	Eliminated in Round of 16
10	Australia	4	2	1	1	5	4	+1	7	Eliminated in Round of 16
11	Morocco	4	1	2	1	5	4	+1	5	Eliminated in Round of 16
12	Mexico	4	1	1	2	6	3	+3	4	Eliminated in Round of 16
13	Canada	4	1	1	2	3	5	−2	4	Eliminated in Round of 16
14	Belgium	4	1	1	2	4	14	−10	4	Eliminated in Round of 16
15	United States	4	1	0	3	2	6	−4	3	Eliminated in Round of 16
16	United Arab Emirates	4	1	0	3	2	13	−11	3	Eliminated in Round of 16
17	Paraguay	3	0	2	1	5	6	−1	2	Eliminated in Group stage
18	China	3	0	2	1	2	3	−1	2	Eliminated in Group stage
19	Ivory Coast	3	0	1	2	2	5	−3	1	Eliminated in Group stage
20	South Africa	3	0	1	2	2	6	−4	1	Eliminated in Group stage
21	Costa Rica	3	0	1	2	3	11	−8	1	Eliminated in Group stage
22	South Korea	3	0	1	2	5	14	−9	1	Eliminated in Group stage
23	Hungary	3	0	0	3	1	6	−5	0	Eliminated in Group stage
24	Malaysia (H)	3	0	0	3	2	9	−7	0	Eliminated in Group stage

Source: rsssf.com
(H) Hosts
