= Joeri Pardo =

Belgian footballer

Personal information
- Date of birth: 12 October 1977 (age 49)
- Position: Midfielder

Senior career*
Years	Team	Apps	(Gls)
1996–2002	Club Brugge KV		
1998–1999	→ Cercle Brugge K.S.V. (loan)		
2002–2003	SC Eendracht Aalst		
2004–2006	R.F.C. Tournai		
2006–2009	K.M.S.K. Deinze		

International career
- Belgium U-20
- * Club domestic league appearances and goals

Joeri Pardo (born 12 October 1977) is a retired Belgian football midfielder. He was a squad member for the 1997 FIFA World Youth Championship.
