= Baroan =

Baroan is both a given name and a surname. Notable people with the name include:

- Baroan Tagro (born 1977), Ivorian footballer
- Antoine Baroan (born 2000), French footballer
