= Tagro =

Tagro is both a given name and a surname. Notable people with the name include:

- Tagro Baléguhé (born 1978), Ivorian footballer
- Baroan Tagro (born 1977), French footballer
- Désiré Tagro (1959–2011), Ivorian politician
