= Júnior Bahia =

Brazilian footballer (born 1977)

Personal information
- Full name: Hamilton dos Santos Júnior
- Date of birth: 2 April 1977 (age 49)
- Place of birth: Brazil
- Height: 1.82 m (5 ft 11 1/2 in)
- Position: Forward

Senior career*
Years	Team	Apps	(Gls)
1995–1998	Bahia		
2002	Centro Sportivo Alagoano		
2002–2006	Marítimo	17	(0)
2002–2004	Marítimo B	38	(22)
2004	→ Penafiel (loan)	14	(9)
2004–2005	→ Paços de Ferreira (loan)	34	(9)
2006	Paços de Ferreira	15	(2)
2007	Treze		
2007–2008	Brindisi	9	(4)
2011–2012	Camaçari	0	(0)
2013	Botafogo Bahia	0	(0)
2013	Fast Clube	0	(0)
2014	Barras	0	(0)
Total		127	(46)

International career
1997	Brazil U20	5	(1)
- * Club domestic league appearances and goals

Hamilton dos Santos Júnior (born 2 April 1977), commonly known as Júnior Bahia, is a retired Brazilian footballer who played as a forward.

== International career ==
Júnior played five games at the 1997 FIFA World Youth Championship, scoring in his country's 10-0 win over Belgium.

== Career statistics ==
=== Club ===
As of 2018.

Club	Season	League			Cup		Continental		Other		Total	
Club	Season	Division	Apps	Goals	Apps	Goals	Apps	Goals	Apps	Goals	Apps	Goals
Marítimo	2002–03	Primeira Liga	6	0	0	0	–		0	0	6	0
Marítimo	2003–04	Primeira Liga	0	0	0	0	–		0	0	0	0
Marítimo	2004–05	Primeira Liga	0	0	0	0	–		0	0	0	0
Marítimo	2005–06	Primeira Liga	11	0	0	0	–		0	0	11	0
Marítimo	Total		17	0	0	0	0	0	0	0	17	0
Marítimo B	2002–03	Segunda Divisão B	19	15	0	0	–		0	0	19	15
Marítimo B	2003–04	Segunda Divisão B	19	7	0	0	–		0	0	19	7
Marítimo B	Total		38	22	0	0	0	0	0	0	38	22
Penafiel (loan)	2003–04	Segunda Liga	14	9	0	0	–		0	0	14	9
Paços de Ferreira (loan)	2004–05	Segunda Liga	34	9	0	0	–		0	0	34	9
Paços de Ferreira	2005–06	Primeira Liga	15	2	0	0	–		0	0	15	2
Brindisi	2007–08	Serie D	9	4	0	0	–		0	0	9	4
Camaçari	2011	–			0	0	–		11 (Note: Appearances in the Campeonato Baiano)	5	11	5
Camaçari	2012	–			0	0	–		19	11	19	11
Camaçari	Total		0	0	0	0	0	0	30	16	30	16
Botafogo Bahia	2013	–			0	0	–		5	0	5	0
Fast Clube	2013	–			2 (Note: Appearances in the Copa do Brasil)	1	–		5 (Note: Appearances in the Campeonato Amazonense)	2	7	3
Barras	2014	–			0	0	–		6 (Note: Appearances in the Campeonato Piauiense)	1	6	1
Career total			127	46	2	1	0	0	46	19	175	66
