= Félix Ettien =

Ivorian footballer

Personal information
- Full name: Félix Dja Ettien Yohou
- Date of birth: 26 September 1979 (age 47)
- Place of birth: Abidjan, Ivory Coast
- Height: 1.84 m (6 ft 1/2 in)
- Position: Midfielder

Youth career
- USC Bassam

Senior career*
Years	Team	Apps	(Gls)
1997–2008	Levante	308	(21)
2011	Alzira	5	(0)
Total		313	(21)

International career
1997	Ivory Coast U20	2	(0)
2001–2008	Ivory Coast	6	(1)
- * Club domestic league appearances and goals

Félix Dja Ettien Yohou (born 26 September 1979), known as Ettien, is an Ivorian former professional footballer.

A right midfielder with great stamina and strength, he also held a Spanish passport due to the years spent in the country, all of them with Levante where he played 324 competitive matches – 81 of those in La Liga.

== Club career ==
Ettien was born in Abidjan. While representing Ivory Coast in the 1997 FIFA World Youth Championship, he caught the eyes of Spanish club Levante UD, who purchased both him and his compatriot Idrissa Keita. While Keita flopped, Ettien became one of the team's most important players – despite suffering racist abuse early on in his career in the country; in his first season, however, he only appeared in seven games (308 minutes) as they were relegated from the Segunda División.

As the Valencian Community side were twice promoted and relegated during his 11-year spell, Ettien was ever-present, appearing in all but four matches in the 2006–07 campaign and scoring two goals in a narrow escape from relegation in La Liga. In July 2008, he left due to the club's serious economic problems.

In September 2009, after more than one year out of football, the 30-year-old Ettien had an unsuccessful trial at Romania's FC Astra Ploiești. In January 2011, he signed with Spanish Segunda División B side UD Alzira.

== International career ==
After the under-20 exploits, Ettien won six caps (one goal) for the Ivorian national team, appearing against DR Congo and Madagascar in the 2002 FIFA World Cup qualification campaign.

== Personal life ==
On 19 October 2018, after several failed business enterprises, Ettien was employed as bus driver at the Royal Spanish Football Federation, presided by his former Levante teammate Luis Rubiales.

== Career statistics ==
Appearances and goals by club, season and competition
Club	Season	League		
Club	Season	Division	Apps	Goals
Levante	1997–98	Segunda División	7	0
Levante	1998–99	Segunda División B	31	3
Levante	1999–2000	Segunda División	38	2
Levante	2000–01	Segunda División	36	1
Levante	2001–02	Segunda División	34	3
Levante	2002–03	Segunda División	33	3
Levante	2003–04	Segunda División	17	1
Levante	2004–05	La Liga	34	2
Levante	2005–06	Segunda División	31	3
Levante	2006–07	La Liga	34	2
Levante	2007–08	La Liga	13	1
Total			308	21

== Honours ==
Levante

- Segunda División: 2003–04
