= Pablo Rodríguez (footballer, born 1977) =

Argentine footballer

Pablo Martín Rodríguez
Personal information
- Full name: Pablo Martín Rodríguez
- Date of birth: 7 March 1977 (age 49)
- Place of birth: Ramos Mejia, Argentina
- Height: 1.75 m (5 ft 9 in)
- Position: Midfielder

Senior career*
Years	Team	Apps	(Gls)
1996–1998	Argentinos Juniors		
1998–2003	Nice	85	(17)
2003–2004	Leganés	26	(2)
2004–2005	Beira-Mar	4	(0)
2005	Montevideo Wanderers		
2005–2007	Olimpo	11	(0)
2008	El Porvenir		
2009	Colón de Santa Fe		

International career
1993	Argentina U17	3	(0)
1997	Argentina U20	5	(0)
- * Club domestic league appearances and goals as of 13:39, 5 November 2009 (UTC)

Pablo Martín Rodríguez (born 7 March 1977 in Ramos Mejia) is a retired Argentine professional football player.

== Career ==
Rodríguez began his playing career with Argentinos Juniors in the Argentine 2nd division, in 1997 they won the championship and promotion to the Primera División. Later that year he was part of the Argentina U-20 squad that won the 1997 FIFA World Youth Championship.

After failing a medical at English side Crystal Palace he joined French side OGC Nice where he played between 1998 and 2003. he also played for CD Leganés in Spain and S.C. Beira-Mar in Portugal.

In 2005, he returned to South America to join Uruguayan side Montevideo Wanderers F.C. After only a few months in Uruguay he returned to Argentina where he played for Olimpo de Bahía Blanca and 3rd division side El Porvenir. His last club was Colón de Santa Fe in 2009.

Actually he is the manager of the 3rd division squad in Club Nacional de Futbol, one of the two biggest teams in Uruguay.

== Honours ==
Argentinos Juniors

- Primera B Nacional (1): 1996–97

Argentina U-20

- FIFA World Youth Championship (1): 1997
