= Pablo Nassar =

Costa Rican footballer (born 1977)

Personal information
- Full name: Pablo Nassar Bolaños
- Date of birth: 28 January 1977 (age 49)
- Place of birth: Alajuela, Costa Rica
- Height: 1.82 m (6 ft 0 in)
- Position: Defender

Youth career
- 1986–present: Alajuelense

Senior career*
Years	Team	Apps	(Gls)
1995–2002	Alajuelense	2	
1995–1996	→ UCR (loan)		
2002–2005	→ Pérez Zeledón (loan)	41	(2)
2005–2009	Alajuelense	62	(3)

International career^{‡}
- Costa Rica U-20
- * Club domestic league appearances and goals as of January 04, 2009 ‡ National team caps and goals as of January 04, 2009

Pablo Nassar Bolaños (born 28 January 1977) is a Costa Rican former professional football player.

== Club career ==
Nassar came through the youth ranks at Alajuelense and won two league titles with the club. He also had spells on loan at Universidad and Pérez Zeledón.

In November 2009, Alajuelense reported Nassar retired from playing football and joined the club's backroom staff. It emerged injury cut short his career.

== International career ==
Nassar played at the 1997 FIFA World Youth Championship in Malaysia.
