= Idrissa Keita =

Ivorian footballer

Personal information
- Date of birth: 10 April 1977 (age 49)
- Place of birth: Abidjan, Ivory Coast
- Height: 1.83 m (6 ft 0 in)
- Position: Midfielder

Senior career*
Years	Team	Apps	(Gls)
1996–1997	ASEC Mimosas		
1997–1998	Levante	5	(0)
1999–2002	Oviedo	67	(0)
1999	Oviedo B	1	(0)
2001–2002	→ Santa Clara (loan)	11	(0)
2003–2005	Algeciras	23	(0)
2005–2006	Mérida	28	(2)
2006–2008	Racing Ferrol	42	(0)
2008–2009	Marino	17	(0)
Total		193	(2)

International career
1997	Ivory Coast U20	3	(0)
2000–2003	Ivory Coast	4	(0)
- * Club domestic league appearances and goals

Idrissa Keita (born 10 April 1977) is an Ivorian former professional footballer who played as a midfielder. He also held Spanish citizenship.

== Club career ==
Keita was born in Abidjan. After starring for Ivory Coast at the 1997 FIFA World Youth Championship he, alongside countryman Félix Ettien, was bought by Spanish club Levante UD. The pair struggled mightily during their first months in the new reality, with Keita eventually failing to settle altogether and leaving in January 1999 for La Liga team Real Oviedo, being irregularly used during his stay and starting in 37 of his 48 games in the top division (the Asturians would be relegated in his third season).

In April 2001, Keita was briefly suspended by the Royal Spanish Football Federation for allegedly holding a false French passport. After five years with Oviedo, which included a loan in Portugal, he continued his career in Spain in its second and third tiers, in a stint in the country which spanned over a decade.
