= Dass Gregory Kolopis =

Malaysian footballer

Das Gregory
Personal information
- Full name: Das Gregory Kolopis
- Date of birth: 1 February 1977 (age 49)
- Place of birth: Kota Belud, Sabah, Malaysia
- Height: 1.67 m (5 ft 5 1/2 in)
- Position: Central midfielder

Youth career
- Sabah FA

Senior career*
Years	Team	Apps	(Gls)
1998	Olympic 2000		

International career
1997	Malaysia U-20	3	(0)
1998–1999	Malaysia U-23	8	(0)
1998	Malaysia	3	(0)
- * Club domestic league appearances and goals

Das Gregory Kolopis (born 1 February 1977) is a former Malaysian football player from Kampung Kelawat, Kota Belud, Sabah. He is former player of FAM special squad Olympic 2000 and Malaysia 1997 youth team.

== Career ==
Dass Gregory is one of the discovered young talents in Malaysian football during 1995. He was selected to represent the country during that year with other young talent like Gilbert Cassidy Gawing, Tengku Hazman Raja Hassan, and Chow Chee Weng in preparation for the 1997 FIFA World Youth Championship.

He represented Malaysia and played a role as the captain of the team during the 1997 FIFA World Youth Championship. After the 1997 FIFA World Youth Championship, he with another three players was selected to train at Highbury with Arsenal. When he returned to Malaysia, he was selected to join FAM special squad the Olympic 2000.

In 1998, Dass Gregory was selected to play for the Malaysia national team in Tiger Cup 1998. However Malaysia as the 1996 Tiger Cup runners-up was defeated by Singapore and Vietnam. Malaysia also held by the weakest team in the group, Laos.

After the failure at the 1998 Tiger Cup, Dass Gregory represented the Olympic 2000 (Malaysia U-23) for Olympic games qualification. Malaysia also failed during the qualification as they only finished third behind Japan and Hong Kong. After that, the Olympic 2000 was disbanded by FAM.

Dass then returned to Sabah and did not participate in any football matches. He is now working as a businessman and hoping to return as the fitness coach for Sabah FA.

== Achievement ==
- 1997 FIFA World Youth Championship squad
