= Wayne Roberts (soccer) =

South African soccer player

Wayne Jason Roberts (born 14 August 1977) is a South African former soccer player who played as a goalkeeper, last for Premier Soccer League club Engen Santos. He also represented South Africa. Roberts hails from Strandfontein on the Cape Flats where he was schooled at Strandfontein High.

In May 2017 he was arrested for possession of illegal drugs

- Previous clubs: Wits University, Ajax Cape Town, Orlando Pirates, Cape Town Spurs
- Bafana Bafana caps won: 1
