= Raúl Román =

Paraguayan footballer (born 1977)

Personal information
- Full name: Raúl Basilio Román Garay
- Date of birth: 25 October 1977 (age 49)
- Place of birth: San Lorenzo, Paraguay
- Height: 1.72 m (5 ft 8 in)
- Position: Forward

Senior career*
Years	Team	Apps	(Gls)
1996–1997	Nacional Asunción	18	(9)
1997	Estudiantes	8	(0)
1997–2000	Beijing Guoan	11	(1)
1998–1999	→ Cerro Porteño (loan)	34	(7)
2000	Sportivo Luqueño	8	(2)
2001	Libertad	20	(1)
2002	12 de Octubre	4	(0)
2002	Sol de América	18	(5)
2003–2004	Tacuary	43	(11)
2004	Olimpia Asunción	18	(3)
2005–2006	Tacuary	55	(21)
2006	Cerro Porteño	19	(5)
2007	Deportes Concepción	17	(1)
2007–2008	Nacional Asunción	44	(9)
2009	Barcelona SC	17	(4)
2010	Sportivo Luqueño	32	(3)
2011–2013	Tacuary	4	(0)
2014	Deportivo Capiatá	13	(2)
2015	12 de Octubre		
2016	Olimpia Itá		
2017	Sportivo Trinidense	1	(0)
2018–2019	General Caballero ZC	4	(0)

International career
1997	Paraguay U20		
1999–2005	Paraguay	8	(2)
- * Club domestic league appearances and goals

Raúl Basilio Román Garay (born 25 October 1977) is a Paraguayan former football striker who played for clubs in his homeland, Argentina, China, Chile and Ecuador.

== Club career ==
On 28 November 1997, he signed a contract for more than a million dollars with the Beijing Guoan, making him the highest-paid player in China, but he did not play well in China. He was sent out in the Asian Cup Winners Cup 1998 Semifinals, then he was loaned back to Paraguay for two seasons. Román returned to Beijing in 2000 but found it hard to play in the Chinese football league, then moved back to Paraguay in the summer.

Abroad, Román also played for Estudiantes de La Plata in Argentina (1997), Deportes Concepción in Chile (2007) and Barcelona in Ecuador (2009).

In his last years as a footballer, Román played for Deportivo Capiatá, 12 de Octubre, Olimpia de Itá, Sportivo Trinidense and General Caballero de Zeballos Cué.

== International career ==
Román was the member of Paraguay U-20 National football team in the 1997 FIFA U-20 World Cup Final.

== Personal life ==
Román is nicknamed Ratón (Mouse).
