= Shawn Petroski =

American soccer player

Personal information
- Full name: Shawn Petroski
- Date of birth: 24 August 1977 (age 49)
- Place of birth: United States
- Position: Forward

Youth career
- –1995: Granite City High School
- 1995–1996: Uerdingen 05

Senior career*
| Years | Team | Apps | (Gls) |
| 1996–1998 | Uerdingen 05 | 6 | (1) |
| 1998–2000 | 1860 Munich II | 20 | (6) |
| Total | | 26 | (7) |

International career
| 1997 | United States U20 | 2 | (0) |
- * Club domestic league appearances and goals

Shawn Petroski (born 24 August 1977) is an American former professional footballer who played as a forward.

== Career ==
Petroski started his professional career with 2. Bundesliga side Uerdingen 05 in 1996, making six appearances. He joined the second team of 1860 Munich in 1998.

== Personal life ==
After retiring, Petroski took up a soccer coaching post at Wesclin High School.
