= Gustavo Cañete =

Paraguayan footballer (born 1977)

Personal information
- Date of birth: April 4, 1977 (age 49)
- Place of birth: Salamanca, Spain
- Height: 1.76 m (5 ft 9 in)
- Position: Defender

Senior career*
Years	Team	Apps	(Gls)
1997–1998	Cerro Porteño		
1999	América	11	(1)
1999–2000	Atlante	22	(1)
2000–2001	Guaraní		
2002	Veracruz	16	(1)
2003	12 de Octubre	22	(1)
2003–2004	Tigrillos	24	(2)
2004–2005	San Luis Potosi	41	(2)
2005–2006	3 de Febrero	36	(2)
2007	Millonarios	9	(0)
2007	Deportivo Pereira	14	(1)
2008	Deportivo Azogues	21	(3)
2009–2011	ESPOLI	119	(1)
- * Club domestic league appearances and goals

Gustavo Cañete (born April 4, 1977, in Salamanca, Spain) is a Paraguayan footballer who plays as a defender for Espoli of the Serie A of Ecuador.

== Teams ==
- (Paraguay) Cerro Porteño 1997–1998
- (Mexico) América 1999
- (Mexico) Atlante 1999–2000
- (Paraguay) Guaraní 2000–2001
- (Mexico) Veracruz 2002
- (Paraguay) 12 de Octubre 2003
- (Mexico) Tigrillos 2003–2004
- (Mexico) San Luis Potosí 2004–2005
- (Paraguay) 3 de Febrero 2005–2006
- (Colombia) Millonarios 2007
- (Colombia) Deportivo Pereira 2007
- (Ecuador) Deportivo Azogues 2008
- (Ecuador) Espoli 2009–2011
