= Awudu Issaka =

Ghanaian professional footballer (born 1979)

Personal information
- Full name: Awudu Issaka
- Date of birth: 26 June 1979 (age 47)
- Place of birth: Sunyani, Ghana
- Height: 1.72 m (5 ft 8 in)
- Position: Midfielder

Youth career
- 1993: Asante Kotoko

Senior career*
Years	Team	Apps	(Gls)
1994–1995	Prampram Mighty Royals		
1995–1996	Anderlecht	0	(0)
1996–1998	Auxerre	0	(0)
1998–2003	1860 Munich II		
1999	1860 Munich	1	(0)
2003–2005	Prampram Mighty Royals		
2005–2006	Liberty Professionals		
2006–2011	Tema Youth		

International career
1995	Ghana U-17		
1997	Ghana U-20		
- * Club domestic league appearances and goals

Awudu Issaka (born 26 June 1979) is a Ghanaian former professional footballer who played as a midfielder.

== Club career ==
Issaka was born in Sunyani. He started playing football at the youth teams of Asante Kotoko, before he moved to Prampram Mighty Royals FC in Ghana's second division, where he already played for the first team at the age of fifteen. In 1995, soon after the FIFA World Youth Championship, Issaka signed a contract at the Belgian club R.S.C. Anderlecht, where he mainly played for their youth team. Issaka caught the eye of the French club AJ Auxerre, in 1996 at a youth tournament. Soon after that he agreed to play for Auxerre, where he played until 1998. In the 1998–99 season Issaka moved to German Bundesliga club TSV 1860 Munich, where he played until the 2003–04 season. Then he played for his former club Prampram Mighty Royals FC for the rest of the 2004–05 season. Issaka later moved to Liberty Professionals, and played the 2005–06 season in the Ghana Telecom Premier League in Ghana. In July 2006 Issaka, joined the newly promoted Ghana Telecom Premier League club Tema Youth.

== International career ==
He played for the Ghana under-17 team in the FIFA World Youth Championship in 1995 in Ecuador. Issaka also took part in the FIFA World Youth Championship 1997 in Malaysia, where Ghana finished on fourth position.

== Honours ==
- 1997 FIFA World Youth Championship – 4th place
- 1995 FIFA U-17 World Championship World Champion
