= Diego Quintana =

Argentine footballer

Personal information
- Full name: Diego Jesús Quintana
- Date of birth: 24 April 1978 (age 48)
- Place of birth: Rosario, Argentina
- Height: 1.62 m (5 ft 4 in)
- Positions: Right midfielder; striker

Senior career*
Years	Team	Apps	(Gls)
1996–2001	Newell's Old Boys	140	(18)
2001–2004	Real Murcia	47	(2)
2004	Instituto de Cordoba	17	(0)
2005	Barcelona SC	?	(?)
2005–2011	Skoda Xanthi	137	(7)

International career
1997	Argentina U20	6	(1)
2000	Argentina U23	2	(0)
- * Club domestic league appearances and goals as of 19:42, 2 December 2008 (UTC)

Diego Jesús Quintana (born 24 April 1978) is an Argentine footballer who spent his career mostly playing for Skoda Xanthi in Greece.

Quintana started his career in 1996 with Newell's Old Boys where he played 140 times, scoring 18 goals. After three seasons with Real Murcia of Spain, he returned to Argentina to play for newly promoted Instituto de Cordoba in the Apertura 2004 tournament. After a brief spell with Barcelona Sporting Club of Ecuador in 2005, he joined Skoda Xanthi of Greece.

He scored the winning goal at the FIFA Youth World Cup in 1997 against Uruguay in front of 62,000 spectators at the Shah Alam Stadium in Kuala Lumpur, Malaysia.
