= Kostas Salapasidis =

Australian soccer player (born 1978)

Personal information
- Full name: Kostas Salapasidis
- Date of birth: 1 July 1978 (age 48)
- Place of birth: Melbourne, Australia
- Position: Striker

Senior career*
Years	Team	Apps	(Gls)
1995–1998	Adelaide City	51	(1)
1998–1999	Wollongong City	18	(5)
1999–2000	SD Compostela	14	(1)
2000	Lugano	4	(0)
2001	Adelaide City	7	(0)
2001–2002	Kallithea		
2002–2004	Parramatta Power	31	(9)
2005	South Melbourne	29	(1)
2008–2009	Adelaide Galaxy	10	(0)

International career
1997	Australia U20	14	(13)
Medal record
Representing Australia
Men's Association football
OFC U-20 Championship
Winner	1997 Tahiti
- * Club domestic league appearances and goals

Kostas Salapasidis (born 1 July 1978) is an Australian former soccer player.

== Club career ==
Started a professional soccer career with Adelaide City in Australian National Soccer League. A striker with a good eye for goal, he played for Wollongong City FC, SD Compostela and Parramatta Power.

== International career ==
Salapasidis represented Australia under-20 in the 1997 FIFA World Youth Championship in Malaysia. He started in all three group games against Canada, Hungary, and Argentina, scoring all four goals in the 4–3 win against Argentina that secured qualification to the Round of 16. He started the Round of 16 match against Japan, a game Australia lost 1–0.

== Honours ==
Australia U-20

- OFC U-19 Men's Championship: 1997
