= Junaid Hartley =

South African footballer

Personal information
- Full name: Junaid Moegemad Hartley
- Date of birth: 22 June 1978 (age 48)
- Place of birth: Cape Town, South Africa
- Position: Midfielder

Senior career*
Years	Team	Apps	(Gls)
1994–1995	Wits FC	26	(1)
1997–1998	Vitoria Setubal	2	(0)
1997	RC Lens B	14	(1)
1997–1998	RC Lens	2	(0)
1998–1999	Seven Stars	14	(3)
2000–2001	Orlando Pirates	2	(1)
2001–2002	Moroka Swallows	17	(2)
2002–2003	Ajax Cape Town	15	(2)
2003–2006	Maritzburg United	48	(3)
2006–2007	Sarawak FA		

International career^{‡}
1997–1999	South Africa	5	(0)
- * Club domestic league appearances and goals as of 30 May 2012 ‡ National team caps and goals as of 30 May 2012

Junaid Hartley (born 22 June 1978) is a South African football (soccer) player.

== Career ==
Hartley turned professional with Wits University at age 16. He moved abroad for spells with Vitória de Setúbal in the Primeira Liga and Lens in Ligue 1. He returned to South Africa where he played for Seven Stars, Orlando Pirates, Moroka Swallows, Ajax Cape Town, Jomo Cosmos and Maritzburg United. Hartley finished his career with Sarawak FA in the Malaysia Super League, and retired after his contract expired in February 2008.

== International ==
He is a former South Africa national football team players from 1997–1999, and he also played for South Africa national under-20 football team in 1997 FIFA World Youth Championship in Malaysia.After returning home to South Africa, Hartley became a drug addict and was admitted to a rehab after being on the streets for almost 12 years.
