= Niall Inman =

English-born Irish footballer

Personal information
- Full name: Niall Craig Inman
- Date of birth: 6 February 1978 (age 48)
- Place of birth: Wakefield, England
- Height: 5 ft 8 in (1.73 m)
- Position: Midfielder

Senior career*
Years	Team	Apps	(Gls)
1995–2001	Peterborough United	12	(2)
1997–1998	→ Stevenage Borough (loan)	?	(?)
2000–2001	→ Kettering Town (loan)	28	(4)
2001	Dover Athletic	6	(0)
2001–2003	Kettering Town	44	(7)
2003–2004	Grantham Town	25	(0)
2004–2007	Mildenhall Town	?	(?)
Total		115	(11)

International career
	Republic of Ireland U21	5	(0)
- * Club domestic league appearances and goals

Niall Inman (born 6 February 1978) in Wakefield, England, is an Irish retired professional footballer who played as a midfielder for Peterborough United in the Football League.

== Honours ==
Republic of Ireland

- FIFA World Youth Championship Third Place: 1997
