= Abdul Karim Ahmed =

Ghanaian footballer

Personal information
- Full name: Abdul Karim Ahmed
- Date of birth: February 5, 1980 (age 46)
- Place of birth: Accra, Ghana
- Height: 1.80 m (5 ft 11 in)
- Position: Defender

Team information
- Current team: FK Tønsberg
- Number: 3

Senior career*
Years	Team	Apps	(Gls)
1993–1997	Real Sporting Club Accra	62	(8)
1998–2001	Kongsvinger IL	79	(3)
2002	Viking	23	(5)
2003–	FK Tønsberg	112	(8)
- * Club domestic league appearances and goals

Abdul Karim Ahmed (born 5 February 1980 in Accra) is a Ghanaian footballer. He currently plays for FK Tønsberg.

Ahmed has formerly played for Real Sporting Club Accra, Kongsvinger IL (1998–2001) and Viking (2002), FK Tønsberg.
