= Khairun Haled =

Malaysian footballer

Personal information
- Full name: Khairun Haled bin Masrom
- Date of birth: 4 June 1977 (age 49)
- Place of birth: Negeri Sembilan, Malaysia
- Position: Defender

Youth career
- 1996–1997: Negeri Sembilan FA
- 1999: Olympic 2000

Senior career*
| Years | Team | Apps | (Gls) |
| 1998 | Olympic 2000 | | |
| 2000 | Negeri Sembilan FA | | |
| 2001 | Selangor FA | | |
| 2002 | MPPJ FC | | |
| 2003 | Perlis FA | | |
| 2004–2006 | Melaka TMFC | | |
| 2006–2007 | Johor FC | | |

International career^{‡}
| 1997–1998 | Malaysia U-21 | | |
| 1999–2000 | Malaysia U-23 | | |
| 2000 | Malaysia | 1 | (0) |
- * Club domestic league appearances and goals as of 31 May 2011 ‡ National team caps and goals as of 29 July 2011

Khairun Haled bin Masrom (born 4 June 1977) is a Malaysian former professional footballer.

== Club career ==
Khairun played for Negeri Sembilan FA, Selangor FA, MPPJ FC, Perlis FA, Melaka TMFC and Johor FC. He was also a member of the Olympic 2000 team that played in the Malaysian League for the 1998 season.

== National team ==
Khairun has played once for the Malaysia national football team.

He was in the Malaysia national under-21 football team that competes in the 1997 FIFA World Youth Championship, held in Malaysia. In the tournament, he scores an own goal in a 1-3 loss against Uruguay, and also was sent off in the game against Belgium as Malaysia exited the tournament in group stage having lost all 3 group games.
