= Diego Markic =

Argentinian association football player

Personal information
- Full name: Diego Fernando Markic
- Date of birth: 9 January 1977 (age 49)
- Place of birth: Argentina
- Height: 1.73 m (5 ft 8 in)
- Position: Midfielder

Team information
- Current team: Al-Taawoun (assistant manager)

Senior career*
Years	Team	Apps	(Gls)
1996–1999	Argentinos Juniors	67	(3)
1999–2004	S.S.C. Bari	84	(2)
2004	Club Atlético Colón	1	(0)
2005	Quilmes Atlético Club	5	(0)

Managerial career
- 2022–2023: United Arab Emirates (assistant coach)
- 2024–: Al-Taawoun (assistant manager)
- * Club domestic league appearances and goals

Diego Markic (born 9 January 1977) is an Argentine football coach and former player. who is the assistant manager of Saudi Pro League club Al-Taawoun.
