= Manuel Abreu (footballer) =

Uruguayan footballer (born 1977)

Personal information
- Full name: Manuel Abreu Faguaga
- Date of birth: 8 March 1977 (age 49)
- Place of birth: Minas, Uruguay
- Height: 1.79 m (5 ft 10 in)
- Position: Forward

Senior career*
Years	Team	Apps	(Gls)
1997–1999	Defensor Sporting		
2000	Racing de Montevideo		
2001	Unión San Felipe	29	(8)
2002	Deportes Temuco	12	(6)
2002	Cobresal	10	(3)
2003	Coquimbo Unido		
2004–2005	Luis Ángel Firpo		
2005	Tacuarembó	14	(3)
2006	Luis Ángel Firpo	19	(6)
2006	Deportes Quindío	0	(0)
2007	Liverpool (Montevideo)	29	(13)
2007	Santa Fe	9	(0)
2007–2008	Montevideo Wanderers	9	(3)
2008–2009	Miramar Misiones	10	(1)
- * Club domestic league appearances and goals as of 11 August 2014

Manuel Abreu Faguaga (born March 8, 1977) is a retired Uruguayan footballer.
