= Martín Perezlindo =

Argentine footballer (born 1977)

Personal information
- Full name: Fernando Martín Perezlindo
- Date of birth: 3 January 1977 (age 49)
- Place of birth: Tostado, Santa Fe, Argentina
- Height: 1.78 m (5 ft 10 in)
- Position: Striker

Team information
- Current team: Chacarita Juniors

Senior career*
Years	Team	Apps	(Gls)
1993–1997	Unión de Santa Fe		
1998	Racing	13	(3)
1998–2000	Unión de Santa Fe	41	(4)
2001	Bella Vista		
2001–2003	Unión de Santa Fe	26	(4)
2003–2004	Millonarios		
2004	Deportivo Pasto		
2005	Deportivo Macará		
2005	Cortuluá		
2006	Espoli		
2006–2007	Tiro Federal		
2007–2011	Chacarita Juniors		

International career
1997	Argentina U20	3	(1)
- * Club domestic league appearances and goals as of May 15, 2008

Fernando Martín Perezlindo (born 3 January 1977 in Tostado, Santa Fe) is an Argentine footballer who last played for Chacarita Juniors.
