= Richard Ackon =

Ghanaian footballer

Personal information
- Date of birth: 10 October 1978 (age 48)
- Position: Midfielder

Senior career*
Years	Team	Apps	(Gls)
- Ebusua Dwarfs
1997-2001	Stabæk		
2002-2005	Ebusua Dwarfs		

International career
1998	Ghana national football team		
- * Club domestic league appearances and goals

Richard Ackon (born 10 October 1978) is a retired Ghanaian footballer. He played as a midfielder.

He played for Ebusua Dwarfs in Ghana before joining Stabæk in Norway in 1997. He played for Stabæk in the Norwegian Premier League and the victorious 1998 Norwegian Football Cup run. He was also capped for Ghana, and was a squad member in the 1998 Africa Cup of Nations.

His last season at Stabæk was in 2001, he then returned to the Ebusua Dwarfs and played there until 2005.
