= Hamid Termina =

Moroccan footballer

Personal information
- Date of birth: January 5, 1977 (age 49)
- Height: 1.81 m (5 ft 11 in)
- Position: Midfielder

Team information
- Current team: Safa Sporting Club
- Number: 11

Senior career*
Years	Team	Apps	(Gls)
1998–2000	Wydad Casablanca		
2001–2003	FC Energie Cottbus	3	(0)
2003–2005	Wydad Casablanca		
2005–2007	Racing de Casablanca		
2008–2012	Safa Sporting Club		
- * Club domestic league appearances and goals as of 13:46, 3 February 2009 (UTC)

Hamid Termina (born January 5, 1977) is a Moroccan footballer. He made his Bundesliga debut for FC Energie Cottbus on August 19, 2001 when he started in a game against Hertha BSC Berlin.
