= Gerardo Torres =

Mexican footballer (born 1977)

Personal information
- Full name: Gerardo Joaquín Torres Herrera
- Date of birth: 14 March 1977 (age 49)
- Place of birth: Mérida, Yucatán, Mexico
- Height: 1.69 m (5 ft 7 in)
- Position: Defender

Senior career*
Years	Team	Apps	(Gls)
1997–2004	Atlas de Guadalajara	206	(11)
2004–2005	Tecos UAG	15	(0)
2005–2006	Monarcas Morelia	16	(0)
2006–2008	Tecos UAG	17	(0)
2006–2008	→ Tecos UAG Zapopán	19	(1)
2009	Caracas FC	?	(?)
2009	Mérida	3	(0)

International career
1997	Mexico U20	4	(1)
- * Club domestic league appearances and goals

Gerardo Joaquín Torres Herrera (born 14 March 1977) is a Mexican footballer. He made his debut with the Atlas de Guadalajara in 1997.

== Atlas de Guadalajara ==
He made his debut with Atlas in 1997.

== Tecos UAG ==
With Tecos UAG, he mainly played with reserve team at Primera División A.

== Caracas FC ==
After 11 years of successful soccer in Mexico, Torres was signed by the Venezuelan club Caracas FC, realizing his dream of playing abroad. He also played for Mérida F.C. in September 2009 before retired.
