= Juan Ramón Escalas =

Spanish footballer and padbol player

Personal information
- Full name: Juan Alberto Ramón Escalas
- Date of birth: 2 December 1976 (age 49)
- Place of birth: Palma de Mallorca, Spain
- Position: Striker

Senior career*
Years	Team	Apps	(Gls)
1995–1999	Mallorca B	107	(24)
1999–2000	Atlético Madrid B	19	(1)
2000–2001	UE Lleida	29	(4)
2001–2002	Elche CF	22	(3)
2002	CD Leganés	9	(1)
2003–2004	Talavera CF	30	(6)
2004–2005	Partick Thistle F.C.	30	(11)
2005–2006	Granada CF	44	(10)
2007	Sangonera Atlético CF		
2007–2009	CD Atlético Baleares	11+	(0+)
2010	UD Collerense		
- * Club domestic league appearances and goals

Juan Ramón Escalas (born 2 December 1976) is a Spanish retired footballer and padbol player.

== Scotland ==
Tied to a one-year deal with Partick Thistle until 2005, Escalas had what was seen as a sublime performance on debut, grabbing two goals to overwhelm Brechin 3–0. He went on to reach six goals in his first five games, including strikes at Airdrie, before putting two goals past Ross County later in October. Setting 20 goals as his 2004–05 objective, the Spaniard finished the season with 11 (league) but had to return to Spain to be with his severely sick mother.

He took English classes with a personal teacher while in Scotland.
