= Aissam Barroudi =

Moroccan footballer

Personal information
- Date of birth: 10 May 1978 (age 48)

International career
Years	Team	Apps	(Gls)
- Morocco

Aissam Barroudi (born 10 May 1978) is a Moroccan footballer. He competed in the men's tournament at the 2000 Summer Olympics.
