= Gauthier Remacle =

Belgian footballer (born 1977)

Personal information
- Date of birth: May 26, 1977 (age 49)
- Place of birth: Belgium
- Position: Midfielder

Senior career*
Years	Team	Apps	(Gls)
1996–2000	Standard Liège	75	(7)
2000–2003	Royal Charleroi SC	62	(1)
2003–2005	Rot-Weiß Oberhausen	38	(0)
2005–2008	FC Wiltz 71		
2008–2011	FC Etzella Etzelbruck	49	(3)
- * Club domestic league appearances and goals

Gauthier Remacle (born 26 May 1977) is a Belgian former footballer.

== Early life ==
Remacle started his career with Belgian side Standard Liège. He is a native of Bastogne, Belgium.

== Career ==
In 2000, Remacle signed for Belgian side Royal Charleroi SC. In 2003, he signed for German side Rot-Weiß Oberhausen. He was described as having "a good 2003-2004 season, continuing his momentum during the current year (2004/05 season)" while playing for the club. In 2005, he signed for Luxembourgish side FC Wiltz 71. In 2008, he signed for Luxembourgish side FC Etzella Etzelbruck.

== Personal life ==
After retiring from professional football, Remacle worked as a youth manager. He has a son.
