= Inti Podestá =

Uruguayan footballer (born 1978)

Personal information
- Full name: Inti Podestá Mezzetta
- Date of birth: 23 April 1978 (age 48)
- Place of birth: Montevideo, Uruguay
- Height: 1.75 m (5 ft 9 in)
- Position: Midfielder

Senior career*
Years	Team	Apps	(Gls)
1996–1999	Danubio	69	(3)
1999–2004	Sevilla	47	(5)
Total		116	(8)

International career
1999	Uruguay	1	(0)
- * Club domestic league appearances and goals

Inti Podestá Mezzetta (born 23 April 1978) is an Uruguayan retired footballer who played as a midfielder.

== Club career ==
In a relatively short career, Montevideo-born Podestá played for Danubio F.C. and Spain's Sevilla FC. With the latter, to where he moved in 1999, his presence was merely testimonial, his best output being 14 games with three goals in the 2000–01 season as the Andalusia club returned to La Liga after one year of absence.

In the following campaign, Podestá featured more (15 matches) but did not find the net. After only eight league appearances in the next three years combined, he retired in July 2004 at only 26.

== International career ==
Podestá made one appearance for Uruguay, in a friendly prior to the 1999 Copa América on 17 June, a 3–2 win in Paraguay. Summoned for the final stages, he did not leave the bench for the eventual runners-up.

== Honours ==
=== Club ===
Sevilla

- Segunda División: 2000–01

=== Country ===
- Copa América: Runner-up 1999
