= Baroan Tagro =

French footballer (born 1977)

Personal information
- Date of birth: 5 October 1977 (age 48)
- Place of birth: Abidjan, Ivory Coast
- Position: Midfielder

Senior career*
| Years | Team | Apps | (Gls) |
| 1996–1997 | Paris Saint-Germain B | 0 | (0) |
| 1997–1999 | Dijon | | |
| 1999–? | FC Langon | | |
| 2001–2002 | Barnet | 0 | (0) |
| 2002 | Stevenage | 1 | (0) |
| 2002–2003 | Carshalton Athletic | | |
| 2004–2005 | Raith Rovers | 4 | (0) |
| 2005–2007 | Houilles AC | | |
- * Club domestic league appearances and goals

Baroan Tagro (born 5 October 1977) is a French former professional footballer who played as a midfielder.

== Career ==
Tagro started his senior career with Dijon in 1997.

He was released by Carshalton Athletic in January 2003.

In 2004, he signed for Raith Rovers in the Scottish Football League First Division where he made four appearances and scored zero goals. He left the club in January 2005. After that, he played for French club Houilles AC before retiring.

He worked as head coach of Noisiel in 2014.
