= José Luis Deus =

Spanish footballer (born 1977)

Personal information
- Full name: José Luis Deus Rodríguez
- Date of birth: 12 January 1977 (age 49)
- Place of birth: Lausanne, Switzerland
- Height: 1.84 m (6 ft 1/2 in)
- Position: Striker

Youth career
- Deportivo La Coruña

Senior career*
| Years | Team | Apps | (Gls) |
| 1995–1998 | Deportivo B | 72 | (20) |
| 1996–2001 | Deportivo La Coruña | 12 | (0) |
| 1998–1999 | → Hércules (loan) | 30 | (4) |
| 1999–2000 | → Racing Ferrol (loan) | 44 | (14) |
| 2000–2001 | → Braga (loan) | 10 | (1) |
| 2001–2002 | Gimnàstic | 40 | (9) |
| 2002–2004 | Xerez | 47 | (2) |
| 2004–2006 | Salamanca | 64 | (12) |
| 2006–2008 | Terrassa | 56 | (2) |
| 2008–2009 | Racing Ferrol | 12 | (1) |
| 2009–2011 | Bergantiños | 34 | (7) |
| 2011–2012 | Sanluqueño | 34 | (1) |
| Total | | 455 | (73) |

International career
| 1995 | Spain U18 | 4 | (2) |
| 1997 | Spain U20 | 7 | (3) |
| 1998 | Spain U21 | 1 | (0) |
- * Club domestic league appearances and goals

José Luis Deus Rodríguez (born 12 January 1977) is a Spanish former professional footballer who played as a striker.

He played 140 Segunda División matches over five seasons, scoring a total of 18 goals for Hércules, Gimnàstic, Xerez and Salamanca. In La Liga, he appeared for Deportivo de La Coruña.

== Club career ==
Born in Lausanne, Switzerland to Spanish immigrants, Deus started his career with Deportivo de La Coruña, being mainly associated to the reserve side during his tenure. His La Liga input with the first team consisted of 12 scoreless appearances, the first coming on 8 September 1996 in a 1–1 away draw against RC Celta de Vigo where he played 23 minutes.

In the summer of 1998, Deus signed with Segunda División club Hércules CF, featuring regularly but being relegated. He achieved promotion the following season with Racing de Ferrol, from Segunda División B.

Still owned by Deportivo, Deus then joined S.C. Braga of the Portuguese Primeira Liga. After leaving the Estadio Riazor, he spent four consecutive seasons in the Spanish second division, being relegated with Gimnàstic de Tarragona and UD Salamanca; in 2006, he helped the latter team to immediately promote.

Deus continue to compete in the third tier the following years, with Terrassa FC and Racing Ferrol. Until his retirement in 2012 at the age of 35, he played amateur football in Galicia.

Deus then worked with Xerez CD as a youth coach. In June 2013, he joined Gimnàstic as a youth coordinator, leaving five years later for CD Lugo where he also acted as assistant to newly appointed director of football Emilio Viqueira, his former Deportivo teammate; on 5 February 2019, the pair was fired.

== International career ==
Deus played once for Spain at under-21 level. On 4 September 1998, he started in the 3–1 victory in Cyprus for the 2000 UEFA European Championship qualification campaign.

On 29 December 2005, Deus scored twice in Galicia's 3–2 friendly win over Uruguay in Santiago de Compostela. It was the region's first official match since 1930.
